= List of members of the Chamber of Deputies of Italy, 1983–1987 =

This is a list of the deputies of the Italian Chamber of Deputies that were elected in the 1983 general election to the IX Legislature.

== Political groups ==
Political Group	Start	End
Christian Democracy (DC)	225	226
Italian Communist Party (PCI)	172	177
Italian Socialist Party (PSI)	73	74
Italian Social Movement (MSI–DN)	42	42
Italian Republican Party (PRI)	29	29
Italian Democratic Socialist Party (PSDI)	23	22
Independent Left	20	20
Italian Liberal Party (PLI)	-	16
Radical Party (PR)	-	9
Proletarian Democracy (DP)	-	7
Mixed Group (GM)	46	8
Totale	630	630
Members of mixed groups
Italian Liberal Party	16	-
Radical Party	11	-
Proletarian Democracy	7	-
Party of Proletarian Unity for Communism (PdUP)	6	-
South Tyrolean People's Party (SVP)	3	3
Liga Veneta (LV)	1	1
Sardinian Action Party (PSd'Az.)	1	-
Valdostan Union - Popular Democrats - UVP	1	1
No Party	-	3

The number of representatives for each group at the beginning of the legislative term takes into account the substitute deputies who were elected by 10 August 1983.

== Office of the President ==
=== President ===
- Nilde Iotti (PCI)

=== Vice Presidents ===
- Oscar Luigi Scalfaro (DC) (resigned on 4 August 1983)
- Giuseppe Azzaro (DC) (elected on 29 September 1983)
- Oddo Biasini (PRI)
- Aldo Aniasi (PSI)
- Vito Lattanzio (DC)

=== Quaestors ===
- Luigi Giglia (DC) (resigned on 21 December 1983)
- Luciano Radi (DC) (elected on 19 January 1984)
- Mauro Seppia (PSI)
- Bruno Fracchia (PCI) (resigned on 17 July 1986)
- Rubes Triva (PCI) (elected on 17 July 1986)

=== Secretaries ===
- Eriase Belardi Merlo (PCI)
- Giancarla Codrignani (Sin.Ind.)
- Filippo Fiandrotti (PSI)
- Pietro Zoppi (DC)
- Renzo Patria (DC)
- Egidio Sterpa (PLI)
- Antonio Guarra (MSI-DN)
- Giuseppe Amadei (PSDI) (resigned on 28 November 1984)
- Dino Madaudo (PSDI) (elected on 28 November 1984)

== Composition ==
Deputy	Constituency	Political Party
Massimo Abbatangelo	Naples	MSI
Adelaide Aglietta	Verona	Radical Party
Paolo Agostinacchio	Bari	MSI
Alberto Aiardi	L'Aquila	DC
Egidio Alagna	Palermo	PSI
Giovanni Alasia	Turin	PCI
Guido Alberini	Brescia	PSI
Guido Alborghetti	Como	PCI
Abdon Alinovi	Naples	PCI
Giorgio Almirante	Naples	MSI
Fortunato Aloi	Catanzaro	MSI
Renato Alpini	Perugia	MSI
Renato Altissimo	Turin	PLI
Malgari Amadei Ferretti	Ancona	PCI
Giuseppe Amadei	Parma	PSDI
Domenico Amalfitano	Lecce	DC
Giuliano Amato	Turin	PSI
Franco Ambrogio	Catanzaro	PCI
Natale Amodeo	Catania	PSI
Salvo Andò	Catania	PSI
Beniamino Andreatta	Bologna	DC
Giuseppe Andreoli	Naples	DC
Giovanni Andreoni	Milan	DC
Giulio Andreotti	Rome	DC
Piero Angelini	Pisa	DC
Vito Angelini	Lecce	PCI
Aldo Aniasi	Milan	PSI
Tina Anselmi	Venice	DC
Silvio Antonellis	Rome	PCI
Varese Antoni	Genoa	PCI
Alberto Arbasino	Milan	PRI
Luigi Arisio	Turin	PRI
Baldassarre Armato	Naples	DC
Lino Armellin	Venice	DC
Vitale Artese	L'Aquila	DC
Rossella Artioli	Milan	PSI
Giuseppe Astone	Catania	DC
Gianfranco Astori	Turin	DC
Giacomo Augello	Palermo	DC
Francesco Auleta	Benevento	PCI
Giuseppe Azzaro	Catania	DC
Luciano Azzolini	Trento	DC
Licia Badesi Polverini	Como	PCI
Cesco Baghino	Genoa	MSI
Laura Balbo	Milan	Independent Left
Nello Balestracci	Pisa	DC
Vincenzo Balzamo	Brescia	PSI
Piero Angelo Balzardi	Turin	DC
Moreno Bambi	Pisa	DC
Arnaldo Baracetti	Udine	PCI
Francesco Barbalace	Catania	PSI
Andrea Barbato	Rome	Independent Left
Augusto Antonio Barbera	Bologna	PCI
Luciano Barca	Ancona	PCI
Roberto Barontini	Florence	PRI
Nedo Barzanti	Siena	PCI
Antonio Baslini	Milan	PLI
Franco Bassanini	Milan	Independent Left
Adolfo Battaglia	Verona	PRI
Gian Paolo Battistuzzi	Rome	PLI
Italo Becchetti	Rome	DC
Eriase Belardi Merlo	Siena	PCI
Giulio Bellini	Bologna	PCI
Antonio Bellocchio	Naples	PCI
Costantino Belluscio	Catanzaro	PSDI
Johann Hans Benedikter	Trento	GM
Luigi Benevelli	Mantova	PCI
Enrico Berlinguer	Rome	PCI
Antonio Bernardi	Parma	PCI
Guido Bernardi	Rome	DC
Filippo Berselli	Bologna	MSI
Romena Bianchi Beretta	Milan	PCI
Vincenzo Bianchi di Lavagna	Milan	DC
Fortunato Bianchi	Milan	DC
Giovanni Carlo Bianchini	Parma	DC
Gerardo Bianco	Benevento	DC
Oddo Biasini	Bologna	PRI
Giancarlo Binelli	Cuneo	PCI
Alfredo Biondi	Genoa	PLI
Mario Birardi	Cagliari	PCI
Tommaso Bisagno	Florence	DC
Fausto Bocchi	Parma	PCI
Guido Bodrato	Turin	DC
Ludovico Boetti Villanis Audifredi	Turin	MSI
Giorgio Bogi	Genoa	PRI
Gilberto Bonalumi	Brescia	DC
Livio Boncompagni	Siena	PCI
Piera Bonetti Mattinzoli	Brescia	PCI
Andrea Bonetti	Brescia	DC
Franco Bonferroni	Parma	DC
Angelo Bonfiglio	Palermo	DC
Emma Bonino	Naples	Radical Party
Gianfrancesco Borghini	Milan	PCI
Felice Borgoglio	Cuneo	PSI
Andrea Borri	Parma	DC
Andrea Borruso	Milan	DC
Franco Bortolani	Parma	DC
Bruno Bosco	Catanzaro	DC
Manfredi Bosco	Naples	DC
Milvia Boselli	Verona	PCI
Giovanna Bosi Maramotti	Bologna	PCI
Giuseppe Botta	Turin	DC
Angela Maria Bottari	Catania	PCI
Aldo Bozzi	Rome	PLI
Piergiorgio Bressani	Udine	DC
Italo Briccola	Como	DC
Alfio Brina	Cuneo	PCI
Beniamino Brocca	Verona	DC
Francesco Bruni	Rome	DC
Riccardo Bruzzani	Florence	PCI
Mauro Bubbico	Rome	DC
Luigi Bulleri	Pisa	PCI
Paolo Cabras	Rome	DC
Paolo Caccia	Como	DC
Francesco Cafarelli	Bari	DC
Luca Cafiero	Naples	GM
Franco Calamida	Turin	DP
Antonio Caldoro	Naples	PSI
Vasco Calonaci	Siena	PCI
Flora Calvanese	Benevento	PCI
Mario Campagnoli	Milan	DC
Severino Cannelonga	Bari	PCI
Leo Canullo	Rome	PCI
Mario Capanna	Naples	DP
Maria Teresa Capecchi	Florence	PCI
Nicola Capria	Catania	PSI
Milziade Caprili	Pisa	PCI
Giulio Caradonna	Rome	MSI
Emanuele Cardinale	Potenza	PCI
Rodolfo Carelli	Rome	DC
Filippo Caria	Naples	PSDI
Natale Carlotto	Cuneo	DC
Giuseppe Caroli	Lecce	DC
Antonio Carpino	Naples	PSI
Giovanni Carrus	Cagliari	DC
Mario Casalinuovo	Catanzaro	PSI
Francesco Casati	Como	DC
Carlo Casini	Florence	DC
Pier Ferdinando Casini	Bologna	DC
Guglielmo Castagnetti	Brescia	PRI
Luigi Castagnola	Genoa	PCI
Luciana Castellina	Milan	GM
Francesco Cattanei	Genoa	DC
Paola Cavigliasso	Turin	DC
Benito Cazora	Rome	DC
Adriana Ceci Bonifazi	Bari	PCI
Enea Cerquetti	Milan	PCI
Gianluca Cerrina Feroni	Florence	PCI
Mario Chella	Genoa	PCI
Salvatore Cherchi	Cagliari	PCI
Michele Ciafardini	L'Aquila	PCI
Adriano Ciaffi	Ancona	DC
Alberto Ciampaglia	Naples	PSDI
Antonio Ciancio	L'Aquila	PCI
Bartolo Ciccardini	Rome	DC
Michele Cifarelli	Bari	PRI
Paolo Emilio Ciofi degli Atti	Rome	PCI
Paolo Cirino Pomicino	Naples	DC
Severino Citaristi	Brescia	DC
Giovanni Cobellis	Benevento	DC
Maria Cocco	Cagliari	PCI
Giancarla Codrignani	Bologna	Independent Left
Leda Colombini	Rome	PCI
Emilio Colombo	Potenza	DC
Sergio Coloni	Trieste	DC
Francesco Colucci	Milan	PSI
Mario Luigi Columba	Palermo	Independent Left
Ottaviano Colzi	Florence	PSI
Lucia Cominato	Verona	PCI
Alfredo Comis	Udine	DC
Antonio Conte	Benevento	PCI
Carmelo Conte	Benevento	PSI
Pietro Conti	Perugia	PCI
Felice Contu	Cagliari	DC
Marino Corder	Venice	DC
Paolo Correale	Benevento	PSDI
Umberto Corsi	Siena	DC
Bruno Corti	Brescia	PSDI
Silverio Corvisieri	Rome	PCI
Raffaele Costa	Cuneo	PLI
Silvano Costi	Rome	PSDI
Bettino Craxi	Naples	PSI
Angelo Gaetano Cresco	Verona	PSI
Giuseppe Crippa	Brescia	PCI
Nino Cristofori	Bologna	DC
Marcello Crivellini	Como	Radical Party
Famiano Crucianelli	Rome	GM
Antonino Cuffaro	Trieste	PCI
Giovanni Cuojati	Como	PSDI
Francesco Curci	Benevento	PSI
Rocco Curcio	Potenza	PCI
Giorgio Da Mommio	Pisa	PRI
Mario D'Acquisto	Palermo	DC
Florindo D'Aimmo	Campobasso	DC
Mario Dal Castello	Verona	DC
Giuseppe Dal Maso	Verona	DC
Michele D'Ambrosio	Benevento	PCI
Ferruccio Danini	Turin	PCI
Saverio D'Aquino	Catania	PLI
Sergio Dardini	Pisa	PCI
Clelio Darida	Rome	DC
Francesco De Carli	Udine	PSI
Francesco De Lorenzo	Naples	PLI
Stefano De Luca	Palermo	PLI
Gianni De Michelis	Venice	PSI
Ferruccio De Michieli Vitturi	Udine	MSI
Ciriaco De Mita	Benevento	DC
Emilio De Rose	Verona	PSDI
Giuseppe Degennaro	Bari	DC
Olindo Del Donno	Bari	MSI
Paolo Del Mese	Benevento	DC
Antonio Del Pennino	Milan	PRI
Renato Dell'Andro	Bari	DC
Paris Dell'Unto	Rome	PSI
Mario Di Bartolomei	Rome	PRI
Giulio Di Donato	Naples	PSI
Michele Di Giesi	Bari	PSDI
Arnaldo Di Giovanni	L'Aquila	PCI
Carlo Di Re	Udine	PRI
Pasquale Diglio	Bari	PSI
Vanda Dignani Grimaldi	Ancona	PCI
Renato Donazzon	Venice	PCI
Antonino Drago	Catania	DC
Cesare Dujany	Valle d'Aosta	GM
Mauro Dutto	Rome	PRI
Michl Ebner	Trento	GM
Enrico Ermelli Cupelli	Ancona	PRI
Adriana Fabbri Seroni	Florence	PCI
Orlando Fabbri	Florence	PCI
Giuseppe Facchetti	Brescia	PLI
Edda Fagni	Pisa	PCI
Luciano Falcier	Venice	DC
Vincenzo Fantò	Catanzaro	PCI
Luciano Faraguti	Genoa	DC
Franco Fausti	Rome	DC
Luigi Dino Felisetti	Parma	PSI
Giovanni Cesare Ferrara	Naples	Independent Left
Giorgio Ferrari	Verona	PLI
Marte Ferrari	Como	PSI
Silvestro Ferrari	Mantova	DC
Giulio Ferrarini	Parma	PSI
Franco Ferri	Rome	PCI
Filippo Fiandrotti	Turin	PSI
Giovanna Filippini	Bologna	PCI
Laura Fincato	Verona	PSI
Gianfranco Fini	Rome	MSI
Mario Fioret	Udine	DC
Publio Fiori	Rome	DC
Filippo Fiorino	Palermo	PSI
Costantino Fittante	Catanzaro	PCI
Giovanni Angelo Fontana	Verona	DC
Arnaldo Forlani	Ancona	DC
Rino Formica	Bari	PSI
Giuseppe Fornasari	Siena	DC
Giovanni Forner	Venice	MSI
Francesco Forte	Como	PSI
Loris Fortuna	Udine	PSI
Franco Foschi	Ancona	DC
Luigi Foti	Catania	DC
Carlo Fracanzani	Verona	DC
Bruno Fracchia	Cuneo	PCI
Angela Francese	Naples	PCI
Franco Franchi	Verona	MSI
Roberto Franchi	Siena	DC
Elio Gabbuggiani	Florence	PCI
Giuseppe Galasso	Naples	PRI
Giovanni Galloni	Rome	DC
Giorgio Gangi	Milan	PSI
Mariapia Garavaglia	Milan	DC
Giuseppe Gargani	Benevento	DC
Alberto Garocchio	Milan	DC
Remo Gaspari	L'Aquila	DC
Isaia Gasparotto	Udine	PCI
Giuseppe Gatti	Como	PCI
Antonio Gava	Naples	DC
Bianca Gelli	Lecce	PCI
Salvatore Genoa	Turin	PSDI
Andrea Geremicca	Naples	PCI
Antonino Germanà	Catania	PRI
Alessandro Ghinami	Cagliari	PSDI
Giovanni Giadresco	Bologna	PCI
Alfonso Gianni	Milan	GM
Luigi Giglia	Palermo	DC
Natalia Ginzburg	Turin	Independent Left
Luigi Gioia	Palermo	DC
Angela Giovagnoli Sposetti	Rome	PCI
Elio Giovannini	Rome	Independent Left
Tarcisio Gitti	Brescia	DC
Gaetano Gorgoni	Lecce	PRI
Giovanni Goria	Cuneo	DC
Massimo Gorla	Milan	DP
Giuliano Gradi	Mantova	PCI
Michele Graduata	Lecce	PCI
Maria Teresa Granati Caruso	Parma	PCI
Lelio Grassucci	Rome	PCI
Ugo Grippo	Naples	DC
Giovanni Grottola	Milan	PCI
Enrico Gualandi	Bologna	PCI
Antonio Guarra	Benevento	MSI
Paolo Guerrini	Ancona	PCI
Luciano Guerzoni	Parma	Independent Left
Antonino Gullotti	Catania	DC
Aristide Gunnella	Palermo	PRI
Guido Ianni	Ancona	PCI
Mauro Ianniello	Naples	DC
Pietro Ingrao	Perugia	PCI
Ugo Intini	Genoa	PSI
Nilde Iotti	Parma	PCI
Bernardino Alvaro Jovannitti	L'Aquila	PCI
Giuseppe La Ganga	Turin	PSI
Giorgio La Malfa	Turin	PRI
Girolamo La Penna	Campobasso	DC
Vincenzo La Russa	Milan	DC
Silvano Labriola	Pisa	PSI
Lelio Lagorio	Florence	PSI
Pasquale Lamorte	Potenza	DC
Valentina Lanfranchi Cordioli	Brescia	PCI
Vito Lattanzio	Bari	DC
Pino Leccisi	Lecce	DC
Silvio Lega	Turin	DC
Claudio Lenoci	Bari	PSI
Lodovico Ligato	Catanzaro	DC
Concetto Lo Bello	Catania	DC
Guido Lo Porto	Palermo	MSI
Arcangelo Lobianco	Naples	DC
Francesco Loda	Brescia	PCI
Adriana Lodi Faustini Fustini	Bologna	PCI
Oreste Lodigiani	Milan	PSI
Antonino Lombardo	Catania	DC
Pietro Longo	Rome	PSDI
Pasquale Lops	Bari	PCI
Pino Lucchesi	Pisa	DC
Francesco Lussignoli	Brescia	DC
Antonino Macaluso	Palermo	MSI
Giorgio Macciotta	Cagliari	PCI
Giulio Maceratini	Rome	MSI
Francesco Macis	Cagliari	PCI
Dino Madaudo	Catania	PSDI
Lucio Magri	Turin	GM
Anna Mainardi Fava	Parma	PCI
Franco Maria Malfatti	Perugia	DC
Piergiovanni Malvestio	Venice	DC
Oscar Mammì	Rome	PRI
Enrico Manca	Perugia	PSI
Alberto Manchinu	Cagliari	PSI
Giacomo Mancini	Catanzaro	PSI
Vincenzo Mancini	Naples	DC
Angelo Mancuso	Catania	Independent Left
Manfredo Manfredi	Genoa	DC
Angelo Manna	Naples	MSI
Antonino Mannino	Palermo	PCI
Calogero Mannino	Palermo	DC
Salvatore Mannuzzu	Cagliari	Independent Left
Nino Marianetti	Rome	PSI
Enrico Marrucci	Venice	PCI
Claudio Martelli	Mantova	PSI
Lamberto Martellotti	Ancona	PCI
Ugo Martinat	Turin	MSI
Mino Martinazzoli	Brescia	DC
Biagio Marzo	Lecce	PSI
Ettore Masina	Brescia	Independent Left
Renato Massari	Milan	PSDI
Clemente Mastella	Benevento	DC
Antonio Matarrese	Bari	DC
Sergio Mattarella	Palermo	DC
Altero Matteoli	Pisa	MSI
Antonio Mazzone	Naples	MSI
Roberto Mazzotta	Milan	DC
Giorgio Medri	Como	PRI
Gianluigi Melega	Brescia	Radical Party
Salvatore Meleleo	Lecce	DC
Savino Melillo	Bari	PLI
Mario Melis	Cagliari	GM
Mauro Mellini	Genoa	Radical Party
Luigi Memmi	Lecce	DC
Gioacchino Meneghetti	Verona	DC
Domenico Mennitti	Lecce	MSI
Carmine Mensorio	Naples	DC
Francesco Merloni	Ancona	DC
Carlo Merolli	Rome	DC
Vito Miceli	Rome	MSI
Filippo Micheli	Perugia	DC
Teresa Migliasso	Turin	PCI
Gustavo Minervini	Naples	Independent Left
Rosanna Minozzi	Florence	PCI
Adalberto Minucci	Siena	PCI
Riccardo Misasi	Catanzaro	DC
Mario Monducci	Parma	PRI
Nicola Monfredi	Lecce	DC
Giovanni Mongiello	Bari	DC
Nanda Montanari Fornari	Parma	PCI
Antonio Montessoro	Genoa	PCI
Giampaolo Mora	Parma	DC
Paolo Moro	Como	DC
Renzo Moschini	Pisa	PCI
Giovanni Motetta	Turin	PCI
Antonio Mundo	Catanzaro	PSI
Cristiana Muscardini	Milan	MSI
Vito Naples	Catanzaro	DC
Giorgio Naplestano	Naples	PCI
Alessandro Natta	Genoa	PCI
Giorgio Nebbia	Bari	Independent Left
Giovanni Negri	Turin	Radical Party
Toni Negri	Milan	Radical Party
Anna Nenna D'Antonio	L'Aquila	DC
Franco Nicolazzi	Turin	PSDI
Renato Nicolini	Rome	PCI
Enzo Nicotra	Catania	DC
Giovanni Nonne	Cagliari	PSI
Francesco Nucara	Catanzaro	PRI
Anna Maria Nucci Mauro	Catanzaro	DC
Achille Occhetto	Palermo	PCI
Vittorio Olcese	Milan	PRI
Mauro Olivi	Bologna	PCI
Pierluigi Onorato	Florence	Independent Left
Dante Orsenigo	Milan	DC
Bruno Orsini	Genoa	DC
Gianfranco Orsini	Udine	DC
Ettore Paganelli	Cuneo	DC
Gian Carlo Pajetta	Turin	PCI
Novello Pallanti	Florence	PCI
Ermenegildo Palmieri	Verona	PCI
Rosella Palmini Lattanzi	Ancona	PCI
Fulvio Palopoli	Verona	PCI
Filippo Maria Pandolfi	Brescia	DC
Marco Pannella	Milan	Radical Party
Antonio Parlato	Naples	MSI
Valentino Pasqualin	Trento	DC
Aldo Pastore	Genoa	PCI
Renzo Patria	Cuneo	DC
Antonio Patuelli	Bologna	PLI
Alfredo Pazzaglia	Cagliari	MSI
Anna Maria Pedrazzi Cipolla	Milan	PCI
Eugenio Peggio	Milan	PCI
Giovanni Pellegatta	Como	MSI
Gerolamo Pellicanò	Milan	PRI
Gian Mario Pellizzari	Verona	DC
Giuseppe Pernice	Palermo	PCI
Antonino Perrone	Catania	DC
Pasquale Perugini	Catanzaro	DC
Edilio Petrocelli	Campobasso	PCI
Amerigo Petrucci	Rome	DC
Claudio Petruccioli	Milan	PCI
Angelo Picano	Rome	DC
Santino Picchetti	Rome	PCI
Flaminio Piccoli	Trento	DC
Giuseppe Pierino	Catanzaro	PCI
Gabriele Piermartini	Rome	PSI
Giampaolo Pillitteri	Milan	PSI
Matteo Piredda	Cagliari	DC
Franco Piro	Bologna	PSI
Lucio Pisani	Turin	Independent Left
Beppe Pisanu	Cagliari	DC
Mario Pochetti	Rome	PCI
Danilo Poggiolini	Turin	PRI
Gian Ugo Polesello	Udine	PCI
Adriana Poli Bortone	Lecce	MSI
Gian Gaetano Poli	Verona	PCI
Enzo Polidori	Pisa	PCI
Guido Pollice	Milan	DP
Claudio Pontello	Florence	DC
Costante Portatadino	Como	DC
Damiano Potì	Lecce	PSI
Luigi Preti	Bologna	PSDI
Franco Proietti	Perugia	PCI
Alberto Provantini	Perugia	PCI
Carmelo Pujia	Catanzaro	DC
Calogero Pumilia	Palermo	DC
Vittoria Quarenghi	Brescia	DC
Nicola Quarta	Lecce	DC
Vincenzo Quattrone	Catanzaro	DC
Elio Quercioli	Milan	PCI
Giuseppe Quieti	L'Aquila	DC
Giovanni Battista Rabino	Cuneo	DC
Luciano Radi	Perugia	DC
Mario Raffaelli	Trento	PSI
Girolamo Rallo	Catania	MSI
Pino Rauti	Rome	MSI
Gianni Ravaglia	Bologna	PRI
Renato Ravasio	Brescia	DC
Luciano Rebulla	Udine	DC
Alessandro Reggiani	Venice	PSDI
Alfredo Reichlin	Bari	PCI
Giuseppe Reina	Palermo	PSI
Adelmo Riccardi	Pisa	PCI
Romeo Ricciuti	L'Aquila	DC
Federico Ricotti	Milan	PCI
Silvano Ridi	Naples	PCI
Luciano Righi	Verona	DC
Luigi Rinaldi	Ancona	DC
Salvatore Rindone	Catania	PCI
Roland Riz	Trento	GM
Enrico Rizzi	Milan	PSDI
Aldo Rizzo	Catania	Independent Left
Vitale Robaldo	Cuneo	PRI
Rolando Rocchi	Rome	DC
Gian Franco Rocelli	Venice	DC
Stefano Rodotà	Catanzaro	Independent Left
Virginio Rognoni	Milan	DC
Domenico Romeno	Bari	PSI
Pier Luigi Romita	Cuneo	PSDI
Edo Ronchi	Brescia	DP
Gianni Wilmer Ronzani	Turin	PCI
Giacomo Rosini	Brescia	DC
Stefano Rossattini	Como	DC
Luigi Rossi di Montelera	Turin	DC
Alberto Rossi	Verona	DC
Giovanni Rossino	Catania	PCI
Antonio Rubbi	Bologna	PCI
Giuseppe Rubinacci	Ancona	MSI
Attilio Ruffini	Palermo	DC
Giorgio Ruffolo	Potenza	PSI
Ferdinando Russo	Palermo	DC
Franco Russo	Rome	DP
Giuseppe Russo	Catania	DC
Raffaele Russo	Naples	DC
Vincenzo Russo	Bari	DC
Francesco Rutelli	Rome	Radical Party
Maurizio Sacconi	Venice	PSI
Giovanni Salatiello	Palermo	Independent Left
Gabriele Salerno	Turin	PSI
Francesco Samà	Catanzaro	PCI
Luigi Sandirocco	L'Aquila	PCI
Nicola Sanese	Bologna	DC
Salvatore Sanfilippo	Catania	PCI
Carlo Sangalli	Milan	DC
Mauro Sanguineti	Genoa	PSI
Bernardo Sanlorenzo	Turin	PCI
Benedetto Sannella	Lecce	PCI
Giulio Santarelli	Rome	PSI
Renzo Santini	Bologna	PSI
Giorgio Santuz	Udine	DC
Angelo Sanza	Potenza	DC
Francesco Sapio	Rome	PCI
Giuseppe Saretta	Verona	DC
Eugenio Sarli	Lecce	PSDI
Adolfo Sarti	Cuneo	DC
Armando Sarti	Bologna	PCI
Edmondo Sastro	Naples	PCI
Angelo Satanassi	Bologna	PCI
Gastone Savio	Verona	DC
Nicola Scaglione	Naples	PSI
Alessandro Scaiola	Genoa	DC
Oscar Luigi Scalfaro	Turin	DC
Alba Scaramucci Guaitini	Perugia	PCI
Guglielmo Scarlato	Benevento	DC
Gianna Schelotto	Genoa	PCI
Vincenzo Scotti	Naples	DC
Martino Scovacricchi	Udine	PSDI
Giacomo Sedati	Campobasso	DC
Mariotto Segni	Cagliari	DC
Carlo Senaldi	Como	DC
Mauro Seppia	Siena	PSI
Massimo Serafini	Parma	GM
Pietro Serrentino	Como	PLI
Rino Serri	Verona	PCI
Franco Servello	Milan	MSI
Claudio Signorile	Lecce	PSI
Giuliano Silvestri	Ancona	DC
Giuseppe Sinesio	Palermo	DC
Sergio Soave	Cuneo	PCI
Giampaolo Sodano	Rome	PSI
Pietro Soddu	Cagliari	DC
Vincenzo Sorice	Bari	DC
Nino Sospiri	L'Aquila	MSI
Gianfranco Spadaccia	Bologna	Radical Party
Ugo Spagnoli	Turin	PCI
Agostino Spataro	Palermo	PCI
Valdo Spini	Pisa	PSI
Tomaso Staiti di Cuddia delle Chiuse	Milan	MSI
Bruno Stegagnini	Florence	DC
Egidio Sterpa	Milan	PLI
Lucio Strumendo	Venice	PCI
Fiorentino Sullo	Benevento	DC
Domenico Susi	L'Aquila	PSI
Gianfranco Tagliabue	Como	PCI
Gianni Tamino	Verona	DP
Antonio Tancredi	L'Aquila	DC
Carlo Tassi	Parma	MSI
Mario Tassone	Catanzaro	DC
Giuseppe Tatarella	Bari	MSI
Nadir Tedeschi	Milan	DC
Francesco Tempestini	Benevento	PSI
Massimo Teodori	Rome	Radical Party
Giancarlo Tesini	Bologna	DC
Antonio Testa	Verona	PSI
Angelo Tiraboschi	Ancona	PSI
Mario Toma	Lecce	PCI
Giuseppe Torelli	Genoa	PCI
Aldo Tortorella	Milan	PCI
Felice Trabacchi	Parma	PCI
Achille Tramarin	Verona	GM
Vincenzo Trantino	Catania	MSI
Franco Trappoli	Ancona	PSI
Ivanne Trebbi	Como	PCI
Mirko Tremaglia	Brescia	MSI
Paolo Tringali	Catania	MSI
Rubes Triva	Parma	PCI
Neide Umidi Sala	Milan	PCI
Salvatore Urso	Catania	DC
Mario Usellini	Milan	DC
Giuseppe Vacca	Bari	PCI
Raffaele Valensise	Catanzaro	MSI
Antonio Ventre	Naples	DC
Nicola Vernola	Bari	DC
Giuseppe Vignola	Naples	PCI
Bruno Vincenzi	Mantova	DC
Luciano Violante	Turin	PCI
Biagio Virgili	Trento	PCI
Michele Viscardi	Naples	DC
Vincenzo Visco	Venice	Independent Left
Bruno Visentini	Venice	PRI
Vincenzo Viti	Potenza	DC
Carlo Vizzini	Palermo	PSDI
Giuseppe Zamberletti	Como	DC
Bruno Zambon	Venice	DC
Amedeo Zampieri	Verona	DC
Marcello Zanfagna	Naples	MSI
Renato Zangheri	Bologna	PCI
Antonino Zaniboni	Mantova	DC
Paolo Zanini	Mantova	PCI
Valerio Zanone	Turin	PLI
Giovanni Zarro	Benevento	DC
Saverio Zavettieri	Catanzaro	PSI
Michele Zolla	Turin	DC
Francesco Zoppetti	Milan	PCI
Pietro Zoppi	Genoa	DC
Giuliano Zoso	Verona	DC
Giuseppe Zuech	Verona	DC
Giuseppe Zurlo	Lecce	DC

== Changes in composition ==
=== Changes in the legislature ===
Outgoing	Incoming	Party	Constituency	Cause	Date
Amerigo Petrucci	Giancarlo Abete	DC	Rome	Death	9 August 1983
Vitale Robaldo	Guido Martino	PRI	Cuneo	Death	9 August 1983
Emma Bonino	Roberto Cicciomessere	PR	Naples	Resignation	10 August 1983
Michele Di Giesi	Eugenio Sarli	PSDI	Lecce	Death	30 November 1983
Luigi Giglia	Raffaello Rubino	DC	Palermo	Death	18 January 1984
Giacomo Sedati	Bruno Vecchiarelli	DC	Campobasso	Death	18 January 1984
Vittoria Quarenghi	Bruno Ferrari	DC	Brescia	Death	16 February 1984
Adriana Fabbri Seroni	Nicola Manca	PCI	Florence	Death	22 February 1984
Luciana Castellina	Mario Cavagna	PCI	Milan	Resignation	24 May 1984
Enrico Berlinguer	Lorenzo Ciocci	PCI	Rome	Death	21 June 1984
Ferruccio De Michieli Vitturi	Gastone Parigi	MSI-DN	Udine	Death	4 July 1984
Antonio Caldoro	Giuseppe Demitry	PSI	Naples	Resignation	11 July 1984
Giovanni Negri	Francesco Roccella	PR	Turin	Resignation	11 July 1984
Mario Di Bartolomei	Tommaso Alibrandi	PRI	Rome	Resignation	2 August 1984
Marcello Zanfagna	Michele Florino	MSI-DN	Naples	Death	20 September 1984
Mario Melis	Giovanni Battista Columbu	PSd'Az.	Cagliari	Resignation	20 September 1984
Mauro Mellini	René Andreani	PR	Genoa	Resignation	20 September 1984
René Andreani	Sergio Stanzani Ghedini	PR	Genoa	Resignation	20 September 1984
Carlo Fusaro	Roberto Barontini	PRI	Florence	Annulment	20 September 1984
Roberto Cicciomessere	Giuseppe Calderisi	PR	Naples	Resignation	14 November 1984
Rocco Curcio	Antonio De Gregorio	PCI	Potenza	Resignation	12 June 1985
Nicola Scaglione	Guido De Martino	PSI	Naples	Resignation	12 June 1985
Benito Cazora	Silvia Costa	DC	Rome	Annulment	19 June 1985
Renato Dell'Andro	Natale Pisicchio	DC	Bari	Resignation	24 July 1985
Nicola Monfredi	Giuseppe Leone	DC	Lecce	Death	25 September 1985
Mario Birardi	Mario Pinna	PCI	Cagliari	Joined the Senate	28 November 1985
Loris Fortuna	Bortolo Mainardi	PSI	Udine	Death	12 December 1985
Lodovico Ligato	Mario Bruno Laganà	DC	Catanzaro	Resignation	15 January 1986
Bortolo Mainardi	Roberta Breda	PSI	Udine	Resignation	15 January 1986
Piergiorgio Bressani	Paolo Micolini	DC	Udine	Resignation	16 January 1986
Ugo Spagnoli	Viller Manfredini	PCI	Turin	Resignation	27 February 1986
Mario Monducci	Francesco Quintavalla	PRI	Parma	Resignation	6 March 1986
Fausto Bocchi	Elena Montecchi	PCI	Parma	Death	22 May 1986
Gianluigi Melega	Franco Corleone	PR	Brescia	Resignation	13 June 1986
Silvestro Ferrari	Ettore Palmiro Pedroni	DC	Mantua	Death	18 September 1986
Paolo Enrico Moro	Giancarlo Galli	DC	Como	Resignation	18 September 1986
Biagio Virgili	Alberto Ferrandi	PCI	Trento	Resignation	2 October 1986
Gianfranco Spadaccia	→ Sergio Stanzani Ghedini (previously elected for the Genoa constituency)	PR	Bologna	Resignation	2 October 1986
→ Sergio Stanzani Ghedini	Angiolo Bandinelli (Marcello Crivellini: remained for the Como constituency)	PR	Genoa	-	2 October 1986
Adelaide Aglietta	Alessandro Tessari	PR	Verona	Resignation	2 October 1986
Marco Pannella	Emma Bonino (previously elected in 1983 and resigned)	PR	Milan	Resignation	5 December 1986
Antonio Bernardi	Liliana Albertini	PCI	Parma	Resignation	11 December 1986
Enrico Manca	Giampaolo Fatale	PSI	Perugia	Resignation	11 December 1986
Giampaolo Fatale	Andrea Manna	PSI	Perugia	Resignation	29 January 1987
Giampaolo Pillitteri	Michele Achilli	PSI	Milan	Resignation	5 February 1987
Giuseppe Amadei	Angelo Tansini	PSDI	Parma	Resignation	5 February 1987
Giuseppe Calderisi	Maria Teresa Di Lascia	PR	Naples	Resignation	19 February 1987
Roberto Mazzotta	Roberto Confalonieri	DC	Milan	Resignation	10 March 1987

=== Changes in political parties ===
==== Christian Democracy ====
- On 31 May 1985, Salvatore Genova joined the Christian Democracy from the PSDI.

==== Italian Communist Party ====
- On 2 February 1984, Silverio Corvisieri left the PCI to join the mixed group.
- On 24 May 1984, Mario Cavagna joined the PCI to replace Luciana Castellina, a member of the PdUP.
- On 1 December 1984, Luca Cafiero, Famiano Crucianelli, Alfonso Gianni, Lucio Magri and Massimo Serafini joined the PCI from the PdUP.

==== Italian Socialist Party ====
- On 16 April 1986, Francesco Roccella joined the PSI from the mixed group.

==== Italian Democratic Socialist Party ====
- On 31 May 1985, Salvatore Genova left the PSDI to join the DC.

==== Radical Party ====
- On 28 February 1986, Francesco Roccella left the PR to join the mixed group.
- On 5 March 1986, Marcello Crivellini left the PR to join the mixed group.

==== Mixed Groups ====
- On 2 February 1984, Silverio Corvisieri joined the mixed group from the PCI.
- On 23 May 1984, Luciana Castellina of the PdUP left office and his successor, Mario Cavagna, joined the PCI.
- On 1 December 1984, the PdUP disbanded and Luca Cafiero, Famiano Crucianelli, Alfonso Gianni, Lucio Magri and Massimo Serafini joined the PCI.
- On 28 February 1986, Francesco Roccella joined the mixed group from the PR.
- On 5 March 1986, Marcello Crivellini joined the mixed group from the PR.
- On 16 April 1986, Francesco Roccella left the mixed group for the PSI.
