= Forlani government =

38th government of the Italian Republic

Forlani Cabinet
- 38th Cabinet of Italy

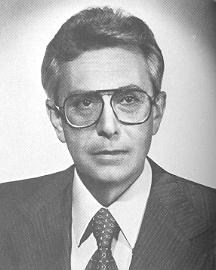
- Date formed: 18 October 1980
- Date dissolved: 28 June 1981

People and organisations
- Head of state: Sandro Pertini
- Head of government: Arnaldo Forlani
- Total no. of members: 26
- Member parties: DC, PSI, PSDI, PRI
- Status in legislature: Coalition government
- Opposition parties: PCI, MSI, PR, PLI, PdUP

History
- Legislature term: VIII Legislature (1979–1983)
- Predecessor: Cossiga II Cabinet
- Successor: Spadolini I Cabinet

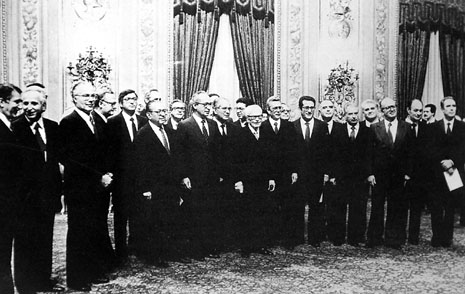
The Forlani Cabinet at the Quirinal Palace for the official portrait.

The Forlani Cabinet, led by Arnaldo Forlani, was the 38th cabinet of the Italian Republic.

The government was composed of the DC, PSI, PSDI and PRI, with the abstention of the PLI. Since in the Italian Senate the abstention is valid as a contrary vote, the two senators of the PLI did not take part in the vote of confidence to the government.

He fell as a result of the P2 lodge scandal. Forlani resigned on 26 May 1981.

== Party breakdown ==
- Christian Democracy
14
- Italian Socialist Party
7
- Italian Democratic Socialist Party
3
- Italian Republican Party
3

=== Ministers and other members ===
- Christian Democracy (DC): Prime minister, 13 ministers and 28 undersecretaries
- Italian Socialist Party (PSI): 7 ministers and 17 undersecretaries
- Italian Democratic Socialist Party (PSDI): 3 ministers and 5 undersecretaries
- Italian Republican Party (PRI): 3 ministers and 4 undersecretaries

== Composition ==
| Portrait | Office | Name | Term | Party | Undersecretaries |
|---|---|---|---|---|---|
| | Prime Minister | Arnaldo Forlani | 18 October 1980 – 28 June 1981 | Christian Democracy | Luciano Radi (DC) (Note: Secretary of the Council of Ministers); Piergiorgio Bressani (DC) (Note: With delegation to Press and SIPLAS.); Luigi Giglia (DC) (Note: With delegation to the Fund for the South.); Francesco Mazzola (DC) (Note: With delegation to security services.) |
| | Minister of Foreign Affairs | Emilio Colombo | 18 October 1980 – 28 June 1981 | Christian Democracy | Costantino Belluscio (PSDI); Libero Della Briotta (PSI); Aristide Gunnella (PRI); Edoardo Speranza (DC) |
| | Minister of the Interior | Virginio Rognoni | 18 October 1980 – 28 June 1981 | Christian Democracy | Marino Corder (DC); Angelo Maria Sanza (DC); Giuseppe Di Vagno (PSI) |
| | Minister of Grace and Justice | Adolfo Sarti | 18 October 1980 – 23 May 1981 | Christian Democracy | Giuseppe Gargani (DC); Domenico Raffaello Lombardi (DC); Francesco Spinelli (PSI) |
| | Minister of Grace and Justice | Clelio Darida | 23 May 1981 – 28 June 1981 | Christian Democracy | Giuseppe Gargani (DC); Domenico Raffaello Lombardi (DC); Francesco Spinelli (PSI) |
| | Minister of Budget and Economic Planning | Giorgio La Malfa | 18 October 1980 – 28 June 1981 | Italian Republican Party | Lucio Gustavo Abis (DC) |
| | Minister of Finance | Franco Reviglio | 18 October 1980 – 28 June 1981 | Italian Socialist Party | Giuseppe Amadei (PSDI); Francesco Colucci (PSI); Mario Gargano (DC) |
| | Minister of Treasury | Beniamino Andreatta | 18 October 1980 – 28 June 1981 | Christian Democracy | Carlo Fracanzani (DC); Giuseppe Pisanu (DC); Eugenio Tarabini (DC); Angelo Tiraboschi (PSI); Claudio Venanzetti (PRI) |
| | Minister of Defence | Lelio Lagorio | 18 October 1980 – 28 June 1981 | Italian Socialist Party | Pasquale Bandiera (PRI); Amerigo Petrucci (DC); Martino Scovacricchi (PSDI) |
| | Minister of Public Education | Guido Bodrato | 18 October 1980 – 28 June 1981 | Christian Democracy | Antonino Drago (DC); Franca Falcucci (DC); Claudio Lenoci (PSI); Giacomo Samuele Mazzoli (DC) |
| | Minister of Public Works | Franco Foschi | 18 October 1980 – 28 June 1981 | Christian Democracy | Francesco Fossa (PSI); Giorgio Santuz (DC) |
| | Minister of Agriculture and Forests | Giuseppe Bartolomei | 18 October 1980 – 28 June 1981 | Christian Democracy | Mario Campagnoli (DC); Fabio Fabbri (PSI); Anselmo Martoni (PSDI) |
| | Minister of Transport | Rino Formica | 18 October 1980 – 28 June 1981 | Italian Socialist Party | Antonio Caldoro (PSI); Giosi Roccamonte (PSDI); Elio Tiriolo (DC) |
| | Minister of Post and Telecommunications | Michele Di Giesi | 18 October 1980 – 28 June 1981 | Christian Democracy | Giorgio Bogi (PRI); Pino Leccisi (DC); Gaspare Saladino (PSI) |
| | Minister of Industry, Commerce and Craftsmanship | Antonio Bisaglia | 18 October 1980 – 20 December 1980 | Christian Democracy | Bruno Corti (PSI); Maria Magnani Noya (PSI); Francesco Rebecchini (DC) |
| | Minister of Industry, Commerce and Craftsmanship | Filippo Maria Pandolfi | 20 December 1980 – 28 June 1981 | Christian Democracy | Bruno Corti (PSI); Maria Magnani Noya (PSI); Francesco Rebecchini (DC) |
| | Minister of Health | Aldo Aniasi | 18 October 1980 – 28 June 1981 | Italian Socialist Party | Bruno Orsini (DC) |
| | Minister of Foreign Trade | Enrico Manca | 18 October 1980 – 28 June 1981 | Italian Socialist Party | Baldassare Armato (DC); Roberto Palleschi (PSI) |
| | Minister of Merchant Navy | Francesco Compagna | 18 October 1980 – 28 June 1981 | Italian Republican Party | Giuseppe Caroli (DC); Giovanni Nonne (PSI) |
| | Minister of State Holdings | Gianni De Michelis | 18 October 1980 – 28 June 1981 | Italian Socialist Party | Giuseppe Antonio Dal Maso (DC); Giuseppe Tocco (PSI) |
| | Minister of Labour and Social Security | Franco Foschi | 18 October 1980 – 28 June 1981 | Christian Democracy | Angelo Castelli (DC); Giuseppe Miroglio (DC); Sisinio Zito (PSI) |
| | Minister of Cultural and Environmental Heritage | Oddo Biasini | 18 October 1980 – 28 June 1981 | Italian Republican Party | Rolando Picchioni (DC) |
| | Minister of Tourism and Entertainment | Nicola Signorello | 18 October 1980 – 28 June 1981 | Christian Democracy | Enrico Quaranta (PSI) |
| | Minister for Parliamentary Relations (without portfolio) | Antonio Gava | 18 October 1980 – 28 June 1981 | Christian Democracy | |
| | Minister of Public Function (without portfolio) | Clelio Darida | 18 October 1980 – 28 June 1981 | Christian Democracy | Francesco Quattrone (DC) |
| | Minister of Regional Affairs (without portfolio) | Roberto Mazzotta | 18 October 1980 – 28 June 1981 | Christian Democracy | |
| | Minister for Extraordinary Interventions in the South (without portfolio) | Nicola Capria | 18 October 1980 – 28 June 1981 | Italian Socialist Party | |
| | Minister for the Coordination of Community Policies (without portfolio) | Vincenzo Scotti | 18 October 1980 – 28 June 1981 | Christian Democracy | |
| | Minister for the Coordination of Scientific and Technological Research (without portfolio) | Pier Luigi Romita | 18 October 1980 – 28 June 1981 | Italian Socialist Party | |
