= First Spadolini government =

39th government of the Italian Republic

Spadolini I Cabinet
- 39th Cabinet of Italy

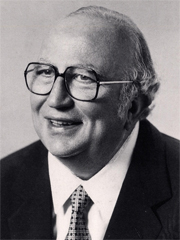
- Date formed: 28 June 1981
- Date dissolved: 23 August 1982

People and organisations
- Head of state: Sandro Pertini
- Head of government: Giovanni Spadolini
- Total no. of members: 27
- Member parties: DC, PSI, PSDI, PRI, PLI
- Status in legislature: Coalition government Pentapartito
- Opposition parties: PCI, MSI, PR, PdUP

History
- Legislature term: VIII Legislature (1979–1983)
- Predecessor: Forlani Cabinet
- Successor: Spadolini II Cabinet

The Spadolini I Cabinet, led by Giovanni Spadolini, was the 39th cabinet of the Italian Republic.

The government, in office from 28 June 1981 to 23 August 1982, was led by for the first time in the republican history of Italy by a non-Christian Democrat Prime Minister, the Republican Spadolini. However, Christian Democracy (DC) maintained the majority of ministries, while forming a large coalition of five parties (Pentapartito) with Italian Socialist Party (PSI), Italian Democratic Socialist Party (PSDI), Italian Republican Party (PRI) and Italian Liberal Party (PLI).

The cabinet fell after the reject of the government's budget law. After that, Spadolini resigned on 7 August 1982.

== Party breakdown ==
- Christian Democracy
15
- Italian Socialist Party
7
- Italian Democratic Socialist Party
3
- Italian Republican Party
2
- Italian Liberal Party
1

=== Ministers and other members ===
- Italian Republican Party (PRI): prime minister, 1 minister, 3 undersecretaries
- Christian Democracy (DC): 15 ministers, 31 undersecretaries
- Italian Socialist Party (PSI): 7 ministers, 15 undersecretaries
- Italian Democratic Socialist Party (PSDI): 3 ministers, 5 undersecretaries
- Italian Liberal Party (PLI): 1 minister, 3 undersecretaries

== Composition ==
Portrait	Office	Name	Term	Party	Undersecretaries
	Prime Minister	Giovanni Spadolini	28 June 1981 – 23 August 1982	Italian Republican Party	Francesco Compagna (PRI) (Note: Secretary of the Council of Ministers)
	Minister of Foreign Affairs	Emilio Colombo	28 June 1981 – 23 August 1982	Christian Democracy	Bruno Corti (PSDI); Raffaele Costa (PLI); Mario Fioret (DC); Roberto Palleschi (PSI)
	Minister of the Interior	Virginio Rognoni	28 June 1981 – 23 August 1982	Christian Democracy	Marino Corder (DC); Angelo Maria Sanza (DC); Francesco Spinelli (PSI)
	Minister of Grace and Justice	Clelio Darida	28 June 1981 – 23 August 1982	Christian Democracy	Giuseppe Gargani (DC); Domenico Raffaello Lombardi (DC); Gaetano Scamarcio (PSI)
	Minister of Budget and Economic Planning	Giorgio La Malfa	28 June 1981 – 23 August 1982	Italian Republican Party	Giovanni Goria (DC) (until 3 June 1982); Emilio Rubbi (DC) (since 3 June 1982)
	Minister of Finance	Rino Formica	28 June 1981 – 23 August 1982	Italian Socialist Party	Giuseppe Amadei (PSDI); Francesco Colucci (PSI); Paolo Enrico Moro (DC); Rodolfo Tambroni Armaroli (DC)
	Minister of Treasury	Beniamino Andreatta	28 June 1981 – 23 August 1982	Christian Democracy	Carlo Fracanzani (DC); Giuseppe Pisanu (DC); Eugenio Tarabini (DC); Angelo Tiraboschi (PSI); Claudio Venanzetti (PRI)
	Minister of Defence	Lelio Lagorio	28 June 1981 – 23 August 1982	Italian Socialist Party	Bartolomeo Ciccardini (DC); Martino Scovacricchi (PSDI); Amerigo Petrucci (DC)
	Minister of Public Education	Guido Bodrato	28 June 1981 – 23 August 1982	Christian Democracy	Antonino Drago (DC); Franca Falcucci (DC); Giuseppe Fassino (PLI); Sisinio Zito (PSI)
	Minister of Public Works	Franco Nicolazzi	28 June 1981 – 23 August 1982	Italian Democratic Socialist Party	Mario Casalinuovo (PSI); Giorgio Santuz (DC)
	Minister of Agriculture and Forests	Giuseppe Bartolomei	28 June 1981 – 23 August 1982	Christian Democracy	Mario Campagnoli (DC); Fabio Fabbri (PSI)
	Minister of Transport	Vincenzo Balzamo	28 June 1981 – 23 August 1982	Italian Socialist Party	Antonio Caldoro (PSI); Dino Riva (PSDI); Elio Tiriolo (DC)
	Minister of Post and Telecommunications	Remo Gaspari	28 June 1981 – 23 August 1982	Christian Democracy	Giorgio Bogi (PRI); Pino Leccisi (DC); Gaspare Saladino (PSI)
	Minister of Industry, Commerce and Craftsmanship	Giovanni Marcora	28 June 1981 – 23 August 1982	Christian Democracy	Gianni Fontana (DC); Enrico Novellini (PSI); Francesco Rebecchini (DC)
	Minister of Health	Renato Altissimo	28 June 1981 – 23 August 1982	Italian Liberal Party	Maria Magnani Noya (PSI); Bruno Orsini (DC)
	Minister of Foreign Trade	Nicola Capria	28 June 1981 – 23 August 1982	Italian Socialist Party	Baldassare Armato (DC); Enrico Rizzi (PSDI)
	Minister of Merchant Navy	Calogero Mannino	28 June 1981 – 23 August 1982	Christian Democracy	Giovanni Nonne (PSI); Francesco Patriarca (DC)
	Minister of State Holdings	Gianni De Michelis	28 June 1981 – 23 August 1982	Italian Socialist Party	Silvestro Ferrari (DC); Delio Giacometti (DC)
	Minister of Labour and Social Security	Michele Di Giesi	28 June 1981 – 23 August 1982	Italian Democratic Socialist Party	Mario Costa (DC); Angelo Cresco (PSI); Mario Gargano (DC); Piergiovanni Malvestio (DC)
	Minister of Cultural and Environmental Heritage	Vincenzo Scotti	28 June 1981 – 23 August 1982	Christian Democracy	Pietro Mezzapesa (DC)
	Minister of Tourism and Entertainment	Nicola Signorello	28 June 1981 – 23 August 1982	Christian Democracy	Enrico Quaranta (PSI)
	Minister of Regional Affairs (without portfolio)	Aldo Aniasi	28 June 1981 – 23 August 1982	Italian Socialist Party	
	Minister for the Coordination of Scientific and Technological Research (without portfolio)	Giancarlo Tesini	28 June 1981 – 23 August 1982	Christian Democracy	
	Minister for the Coordination of Community Policies (without portfolio)	Lucio Abis	28 June 1981 – 23 August 1982	Christian Democracy	
	Minister for the Coordination of Civil Protection (without portfolio)	Giuseppe Zamberletti	28 June 1981 – 23 August 1982	Christian Democracy	
	Minister of Public Function (without portfolio)	Dante Schietroma	28 June 1981 – 23 August 1982	Italian Democratic Socialist Party	Francesco Quattrone (DC)
	Minister for Extraordinary Interventions in the South (without portfolio)	Claudio Signorile	28 June 1981 – 23 August 1982	Italian Socialist Party	Salvatore Urso (DC)
	Minister for Parliamentary Relations (without portfolio)	Luciano Radi	28 June 1981 – 23 August 1982	Christian Democracy	
