= Second Spadolini government =

40th government of the Italian Republic

Spadolini II Cabinet
- 40th Cabinet of Italy

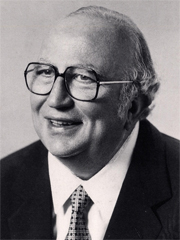
- Date formed: 23 August 1982
- Date dissolved: 1 December 1982

People and organisations
- Head of state: Sandro Pertini
- Head of government: Giovanni Spadolini
- Total no. of members: 28 (incl. Prime Minister)
- Member parties: DC, PSI, PSDI, PRI, PLI
- Status in legislature: Coalition government Pentapartito
- Opposition parties: PCI, MSI, PR, PdUP

History
- Legislature term: VIII Legislature (1979–1983)
- Predecessor: Spadolini I Cabinet
- Successor: Fanfani V Cabinet

The Spadolini II Cabinet, led by Giovanni Spadolini, was the 40th cabinet of the Italian Republic.

The government remained in office from 23 August 1982 to 1 December 1982. This government was also known as the "Photocopy government", as identical to the previous Spadolini Cabinet.

The cabinet fell due to the so-called "Lite delle comari" (godmothers' quarrel), i.e. a political conflict between the ministers Beniamino Andreatta and Rino Formica about the "divorce" between Minister of Treasury and Bank of Italy.

== Party breakdown ==
- Christian Democracy
15
- Italian Socialist Party
7
- Italian Democratic Socialist Party
3
- Italian Republican Party
2
- Italian Liberal Party
1

=== Ministers and other members ===
- Italian Republican Party (PRI): prime minister, 1 minister, 3 undersecretaries
- Christian Democracy (DC): 15 ministers, 31 undersecretaries
- Italian Socialist Party (PSI): 7 ministers, 15 undersecretaries
- Italian Democratic Socialist Party (PSDI): 3 ministers, 5 undersecretaries
- Italian Liberal Party (PLI): 1 minister, 3 undersecretaries

== Composition ==
Portrait	Office	Name	Term	Party	Undersecretaries
	Prime Minister	Giovanni Spadolini	23 August 1982 – 1 December 1982	Italian Republican Party	Vittorio Olcese (PRI) (Note: Secretary of the Council of Ministers)
	Minister of Foreign Affairs	Emilio Colombo	23 August 1982 – 1 December 1982	Christian Democracy	Bruno Corti (PSDI); Raffaele Costa (PLI); Mario Fioret (DC); Roberto Palleschi (PSI)
	Minister of the Interior	Virginio Rognoni	23 August 1982 – 1 December 1982	Christian Democracy	Marino Corder (DC); Angelo Maria Sanza (DC); Francesco Spinelli (PSI)
	Minister of Grace and Justice	Clelio Darida	23 August 1982 – 1 December 1982	Christian Democracy	Giuseppe Gargani (DC); Domenico Raffaello Lombardi (DC); Gaetano Scamarcio (PSI)
	Minister of Budget and Economic Planning	Giorgio La Malfa	23 August 1982 – 1 December 1982	Italian Republican Party	Emilio Rubbi (DC)
	Minister of Finance	Rino Formica	23 August 1982 – 1 December 1982	Italian Socialist Party	Giuseppe Amadei (PSDI); Francesco Colucci (PSI); Paolo Enrico Moro (DC); Rodolfo Tambroni Armaroli (DC)
	Minister of Treasury	Beniamino Andreatta	23 August 1982 – 1 December 1982	Christian Democracy	Carlo Fracanzani (DC); Giuseppe Pisanu (DC); Eugenio Tarabini (DC); Angelo Tiraboschi (PSI); Claudio Venanzetti (PRI)
	Minister of Defence	Lelio Lagorio	23 August 1982 – 1 December 1982	Italian Socialist Party	Bartolomeo Ciccardini (DC); Martino Scovacricchi (PSDI); Amerigo Petrucci (DC)
	Minister of Public Education	Guido Bodrato	23 August 1982 – 1 December 1982	Christian Democracy	Antonino Drago (DC); Franca Falcucci (DC); Giuseppe Fassino (PLI); Sisinio Zito (PSI)
	Minister of Public Works	Franco Nicolazzi	23 August 1982 – 1 December 1982	Italian Democratic Socialist Party	Mario Casalinuovo (PSI); Giorgio Santuz (DC)
	Minister of Agriculture and Forests	Giuseppe Bartolomei	23 August 1982 – 1 December 1982	Christian Democracy	Mario Campagnoli (DC); Fabio Fabbri (PSI)
	Minister of Transport	Vincenzo Balzamo	23 August 1982 – 1 December 1982	Italian Socialist Party	Antonio Caldoro (PSI); Dino Riva (PSDI); Elio Tiriolo (DC)
	Minister of Post and Telecommunications	Remo Gaspari	23 August 1982 – 1 December 1982	Christian Democracy	Giorgio Bogi (PRI); Pino Leccisi (DC); Gaspare Saladino (PSI)
	Minister of Industry, Commerce and Craftsmanship	Giovanni Marcora	23 August 1982 – 1 December 1982	Christian Democracy	Gianni Fontana (DC); Enrico Novellini (PSI); Francesco Rebecchini (DC)
	Minister of Health	Renato Altissimo	23 August 1982 – 1 December 1982	Italian Liberal Party	Maria Magnani Noya (PSI); Bruno Orsini (DC)
	Minister of Foreign Trade	Nicola Capria	23 August 1982 – 1 December 1982	Italian Socialist Party	Baldassare Armato (DC); Enrico Rizzi (PSDI)
	Minister of Merchant Navy	Calogero Mannino	23 August 1982 – 1 December 1982	Christian Democracy	Giovanni Nonne (PSI); Francesco Patriarca (DC)
	Minister of State Holdings	Gianni De Michelis	23 August 1982 – 1 December 1982	Italian Socialist Party	Silvestro Ferrari (DC); Delio Giacometti (DC)
	Minister of Labour and Social Security	Michele Di Giesi	23 August 1982 – 1 December 1982	Italian Democratic Socialist Party	Mario Costa (DC); Angelo Cresco (PSI); Mario Gargano (DC); Piergiovanni Malvestio (DC)
	Minister of Cultural and Environmental Heritage	Vincenzo Scotti	23 August 1982 – 1 December 1982	Christian Democracy	Pietro Mezzapesa (DC)
	Minister of Tourism and Entertainment	Nicola Signorello	23 August 1982 – 1 December 1982	Christian Democracy	Enrico Quaranta (PSI)
	Minister of Regional Affairs (without portfolio)	Aldo Aniasi	23 August 1982 – 1 December 1982	Italian Socialist Party	
	Minister for the Coordination of Scientific and Technological Research (without portfolio)	Giancarlo Tesini	23 August 1982 – 1 December 1982	Christian Democracy	
	Minister for the Coordination of Community Policies (without portfolio)	Lucio Abis	23 August 1982 – 1 December 1982	Christian Democracy	
	Minister for the Coordination of Civil Protection (without portfolio)	Giuseppe Zamberletti	23 August 1982 – 1 December 1982	Christian Democracy	
	Minister of Public Function (without portfolio)	Dante Schietroma	23 August 1982 – 1 December 1982	Italian Democratic Socialist Party	Francesco Quattrone (DC)
	Minister for Extraordinary Interventions in the South (without portfolio)	Claudio Signorile	23 August 1982 – 1 December 1982	Italian Socialist Party	Salvatore Urso (DC)
	Minister for Parliamentary Relations (without portfolio)	Luciano Radi	23 August 1982 – 1 December 1982	Christian Democracy	
