= Spadolini =

Spadolini may refer to:

- Giovanni Spadolini (1925–1994), Italian journalist, 44th Prime Minister of Italy, one-month Acting President of Italy upon the resignation of President Cossiga in 1992
  - Spadolini I Cabinet, in office from 28 June 1981 to 23 August 1982
  - Spadolini II Cabinet, in office from 23 August 1982 to 1 December 1982
- 15381 Spadolini, a minor planet discovered by V. Goretti in 1997
