= Giorgio Ruffolo =

Italian politician (1926–2023)

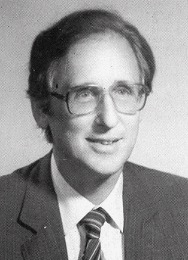

Minister of the Environment
- In office 29 July 1987 – 28 June 1992
- Prime Minister: Giovanni Goria; Ciriaco De Mita; Giulio Andreotti
- Preceded by: Mario Pavan
- Succeeded by: Carlo Ripa di Meana

Member of the Senate
- In office 1 July 1987 – 14 April 1994

Member of the Chamber of Deputies
- In office 12 July 1983 – 1 July 1987

Personal details
- Born: 14 August 1926 Rome, Kingdom of Italy
- Died: 16 February 2023 (aged 96) Rome, Italy
- Party: PSI (1944–1947; 1958–1994); PSDI (1947–1958); PDS (1994–1998); DS (1998–2007); PD (2007–2023)
- Education: Sapienza University of Rome

Giorgio Ruffolo (14 August 1926 – 16 February 2023) was an Italian economist, journalist and politician who held several government posts and was the Minister of the Environment for five years between 1987 and 1992 in four successive cabinets. He was a member of the now defunct Italian Socialist Party (PSI) and a significant socialist intellectual. He is known to be the founder of economic planning in Italy.

== Biography ==
Ruffolo was born on 14 August 1926 in Rome. In his formative years he was a member of the Italian Socialist Youth Federation (FGSI), and was one of its most prominent leaders during the early post-war period, alongside Vincenzo Balzamo, Erasmo Boiardi, Dario Valori, Emo Egoli, Giacomo Princigalli, Bettino Craxi and Claudio Signorile. Staunchly anti-Stalinist, the FGSI opposed the fusionist (pro-communist) policies of the PSI leader, Pietro Nenni, and in 1947 it followed Giuseppe Saragat into a new, more moderate organisation, the Italian Socialist Workers' Party (PSLI), which five years later was rebranded as the Italian Democratic Socialist Party (PSDI). Although still possessed of revolutionary aspirations – as demonstrated by the pseudonymous articles he wrote for the Trotskyist periodical Bandiera Rossa – Ruffolo sided with the FGSI and became a member of the reformist PSDI.

Ruffolo headed the research and public relations department of the state-owned oil conglomerate Eni between 1956 and 1962, and was a close associate of the company's powerful chairman, Enrico Mattei. After Mattei's death in a plane crash in 1962, Ruffolo left Eni to take on, at just 36, the role of Secretary General for Economic Planning in the Italian Government, having been appointed by the Minister of Budget and Economic Planning, Ugo La Malfa. He held this position for over a decade in various center-left governments, and became a pivotal figure in spearheading planning initiatives alongside his fellow economists, Giorgio Fuà and Paolo Sylos Labini. In 1965, the Budget Ministry approved the Economic Development Program for the forthcoming five-year period, which Christian Democrat politician Amintore Fanfani sarcastically dubbed "the book of dreams". Most of Ruffolo's ambitious schemes came to naught, and in 1975 he resigned from the Ministry having published a report chronicling the few successes and many failures he witnessed.

Meanwhile, Ruffolo had rejoined the PSI in 1958, gravitating towards a small faction led by the ex-communist deputy Antonio Giolitti. During the 1970s, he became associated with the party's intelligentsia, and contributed to Progetto socialista ("Socialist Project", 1976), an embryonic party manifesto (later made official) which brought together authors such as Luciano Cafagna, Giuliano Amato, Francesco Alberoni, Corrado Serra, Roberto Guiducci, and Altiero Spinelli. By this time, Ruffolo had moved away from the relatively obscure Giolitti faction and towards the hard-left grouping led by Riccardo Lombardi. As with Lombardi, Ruffolo was sharply critical of the PSI's new leader, Bettino Craxi, but he agreed with Craxi's fundamental strategy of guarding the party's autonomy and seeking to differentiate it from the Christian Democrats (DC) and Italian Communist Party (PCI), both of which were engaged throughout the late 1970s in shaping the compromesso storico ("Historic Compromise").

In 1981, Ruffolo cofounded the Europa Research Centre (Centro Europa Ricerche), a Rome-based research institute in applied economic analysis with a special reference to the central issues for Italian and European economic policy. The other founders of the institute included Antonio Pedone and Luigi Spaventa. He was also the president of a public investment company, Finanziaria Meridionale, which had been established to improve the economic development of Southern Italy.

Ruffolo had first stood as a parliamentary candidate in 1979, when he failed to be elected to the European Parliament. In 1983 he was elected to the Chamber of Deputies, representing Potenza. Four years later, at the 1987 general election, he was elected to the Senate and was immediately appointed Minister of the Environment in the new Government formed by Giovanni Goria. Although he was an economist by profession, he had published various publications on the environment, which made him one of the most qualified of all Italian environment ministers. During his term in office, the ministry published its first report about environmental conditions in the country. Another significant event was the closure of the Farmoplant in Massa in July 1988, following a massive explosion which had caused environmental pollution along the Massa coastline.

Ruffolo also served in the European Parliament for three terms: 17 July 1979 to 30 September 1983, 19 July 1994 to 19 July 1999, and 20 July 1999 to 19 July 2004.

Ruffolo was a contributor to the Italian edition of Huffington Post and Italian newspaper la Repubblica.

Ruffolo died in Rome on 16 February 2023, at the age of 96.
