= Cerquetti =

Cerquetti is an Italian surname. Notable people with the surname include:

- Anita Cerquetti (1931–2014), Italian dramatic soprano
- Enea Cerquetti (1938–2021), Italian politician
