= Lucio Abis =

Italian politician (1926–2014)

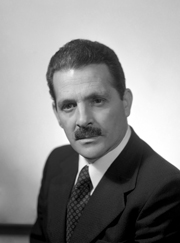

Minister for Parliamentary Relations
- In office 1 December 1982 – 4 August 1983
- Prime Minister: Amintore Fanfani
- Preceded by: Luciano Radi
- Succeeded by: Oscar Mammì

Minister for the Coordination of Community Policies
- In office 28 June 1981 – 1 December 1982
- Prime Minister: Giovanni Spadolini
- Preceded by: Vincenzo Scotti
- Succeeded by: Alfredo Biondi

President of Sardinia
- In office 2 February 1970 – 5 November 1970
- Preceded by: Giovanni Del Rio
- Succeeded by: Antonio Giagu Demartini

Member of the Senate
- In office 25 May 1972 – 14 April 1994

Personal details
- Born: Lucio Gustavo Abis; 24 February 1926 Oristano, Sardinia, Italy
- Died: 20 December 2014 (aged 88) Oristano, Sardinia, Italy
- Party: DC
- Profession: Politician, teacher

Lucio Abis (24 February 1926 – 20 December 2014) was an Italian politician from Oristano who was part of the Christian Democrats.

== Biography ==
Abis was born 24 February 1926 in Oristano. Prior to entering politics he was a teacher.

He joined the Christian Democracy in 1950. In 1952 he was elected municipal councilor of Villaurbana, of which he was also mayor from 1956 to 1963. He was regional councilor of Sardinia from 1957 to 1972, assessor for labor and education from 1963 to 1967 and assessor for the Renaissance from 1967 to 1969. He served as president of the Sardinia region from February to November 1970, then, from 1971 to 1972, he served again as assessor (agriculture and forests). He was Senator of the Republic for six legislatures, from April 1972 to March 1994, always elected in the constituency of Oristano.

Abis served as undersecretary for the Treasury (first and second Moro government, third Andreotti government), as undersecretary for Budget and Economic Planning (fourth and fifth Andreotti government, first and second Cossiga government, Forlani government), as minister for the coordination of community policies (first and second Spadolini government), and as minister for relations with the Parliament (fifth Fanfani government). Finally, he was president of the Parliamentary Budget and Treasury Committee of the Senate in the XI legislature (1992–94).

Abis died on 20 December 2014 at the age of 88.

== Legacy ==
Abis's hometown Oristano honored him by creating and naming a public square, the Piazza Lucio Abis. This square was made due to his prominent career and key role in establishing the Province of Oristano in 1974.
