= Signorile =

Signorile is an Italian surname. Notable people with the surname include:

- Chiaffredo Signorile (1913–1999), Italian writer
- Claudio Signorile (born 1937), Italian socialist politician
- Eugenia Signorile (1914–?), Italian writer
- Michelangelo Signorile (born 1960), American journalist, author, and radio host
