= Angelo Mancuso =

Angelo Mancuso may refer to:

- Angelo Mancuso (American politician)
- Angelo Mancuso (Italian politician)
