= Emilio Rubbi =

Italian politician (1930–2005)

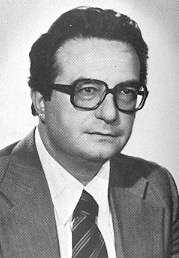
- Born: 15 June 1930; Bologna, Kingdom of Italy
- Died: 1 June 2005 (aged 74); Bologna, Italy
- Occupation: Economist
- Known for: Member of the Christian Democrats

Emilio Rubbi (1930–2005) was an Italian economist and politician who was a member of the Christian Democrats. He served as the secretary of the council of ministers in various cabinets. He was also elected to the Italian Parliament.

== Biography ==
Rubbi was born in Bologna on 15 June 1930. He obtained a degree in economics and business. Rubbi joined the Christian Democracy Party. He was named as its administrative secretary in mid-1993 replacing Severino Citaristi in the post. In the party Rubbi was among the allies of Aldo Moro.

Rubbi was elected to the Parliament in 1976 and served there for three terms (Legislatures VII, VIII and X). Between 1983 and 1987 he was a member of the Italian Senate (Legislature IX). From 1982 to 1992 he was the secretary of the council of ministers in the following cabinets: first and second cabinets of Giovanni Spadolini, cabinet of Giovanni Goria, cabinet of Ciriaco De Mita, and fourth and sixth cabinets of Giulio Andreotti.

He died of diabetes in Bologna on 1 June 2005.
