= Angelo Mancuso (Italian politician) =

Italian politician

Angelo Mancuso is an Italian former politician.

Born in Caltagirone on 28 November 1928, Mancuso was a trade unionist and journalist who served in the ninth Italian Legislature as member of the Chamber of Deputies. He was associated with the Italian Communist Party and the Independent Left.
