= Antonio De Gregorio =

Italian politician

Antonio De Gregorio known as Nino (Potenza , 28 February 1938 – Potenza , 8 May 2015) was an Italian politician, member of Parliament from 1985 to 1987.

He was a militant and leader of the PSIUP and the PCI, a municipal councilor of Potenza and one of the deputies of the IX legislature of the Italian Republic.

He died on May 8, 2015 at the age of 77.
