= Pierluigi Onorato =

Italian magistrate and politician (1938–2023)

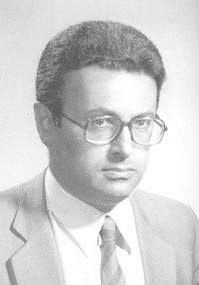

Member of the Senate of the Republic of Italy
- In office 2 July 1987 – 22 April 1992
- Constituency: Florence III

Member of the Chamber of Deputies of Italy
- In office 13 June 1979 – 1 July 1987

Personal details
- Born: 17 August 1938 La Maddalena, Italy
- Died: 5 March 2023 (aged 84) Florence, Italy
- Party: PCI; SI
- Occupation: Magistrate

Pierluigi Onorato (17 August 1938 – 5 March 2023) was an Italian politician. A member of the Italian Communist Party and the Independent Left, he served in the Chamber of Deputies from 1979 to 1987 and in the Senate of the Republic from 1987 to 1992.

Onorato died in Florence on 5 March 2023, at the age of 84.
