= Alfio Brina =

Italian politician (1941–2026)

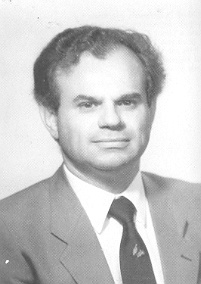
- Brina in 1983

Member of the Senate of the Republic of Italy for Alessandria-Tortona
- In office 2 July 1987 – 14 April 1994

Member of the Chamber of Deputies of Italy for Cuneo-Asti-Alessandria
- In office 12 July 1983 – 1 July 1987

Personal details
- Born: 19 June 1941 Tresigallo, Italy
- Died: 7 June 2026 (aged 84)
- Party: PCI (until 1991); PDS (after 1991)
- Occupation: Clerk

Alfio Brina (19 June 1941 – 7 June 2026) was an Italian politician. A member of the Italian Communist Party and the Democratic Party of the Left, he served in the Chamber of Deputies from 1983 to 1987 and in the Senate of the Republic from 1987 to 1994.

Brina died on 7 June 2026, at the age of 84.
