= Giovanni Negri =

Italian politician (born 1957)

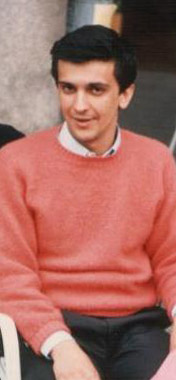
Negri in 1987

Giovanni Negri (born 16 May 1957) is an Italian politician.

== Biography ==
Born in Turin and a member of the Radical Party (PR), he was the party's secretary from 1984 to 1988, with it dissolving soon after. He was elected to the Chamber of Deputies in 1983 by his city's constituency. He resigned in July 1984 and was replaced by Franco Roccella. He was re-elected again to serve from 1987 to 1992.

From April 1988 to July 1989 he was a Member of the European Parliament. In 2016, he was leading the social movement and planned political party La Marianna, named after Marianne, the effigy of the French Revolution. He described it as a voice for the "homeless" of politics whom he considered to have been let down by Matteo Renzi, Beppe Grillo and Lega Nord. In 2018, he campaigned for Energies for Italy (EpI), a centre-right party founded by Stefano Parisi.
