= Renzo Patria =

Italian politician (1933–2019)

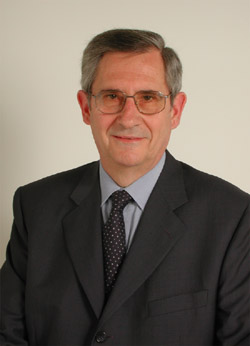
Renzo Patria

Renzo Patria (10 November 1933 – 8 June 2019) was an Italian politician. He was member of the Christian Democracy party.

== Biography ==
A member of the Christian Democracy (Italy) party, he served as mayor of Frugarolo and as a city councilor in Alessandria. He was elected to the Chamber of Deputies in 1979 and served there for four consecutive terms, until 1994.

He later joined Forza Italia (1994), and was re-elected to the Chamber of Deputies for the 14th Legislature, serving from 2001 to 2006, during which time he served as Chairman of the Finance and Treasury Committee.

He died at the age of 85 in June 2019.
