= Enea Cerquetti =

Italian politician (1938–2021)

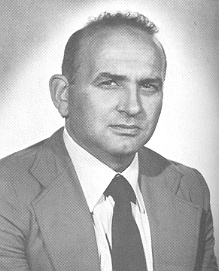
- Cerquetti in 1979

Member of the Chamber of Deputies of Italy
- In office 20 June 1979 – 1 July 1987
- Constituency: Milan

Mayor of Cinisello Balsamo
- In office 1970–1979
- Preceded by: Aldo Raimondi
- Succeeded by: Felice Riccardi

Mayor of Cusano Milanino
- In office 1990–1994
- Preceded by: Giuseppe Maserati
- Succeeded by: Giuseppe Maserati

Personal details
- Born: 14 January 1938 Milan, Italy
- Died: 21 September 2021 (aged 83) Cinisello Balsamo, Italy
- Party: PCI; PDS
- Occupation: Politician

Enea Cerquetti (14 January 1938 – 21 September 2021) was an Italian politician.

== Biography ==
Cerquetti was a member of the Italian Communist Party (PCI) and began his career as Mayor of Cinisello Balsamo, serving from 1970 to 1979. In 1979, he was elected to the Chamber of Deputies and served in the 8th and 9th Legislatures. In his first term, he served on the Weapons and Military Use Committee from 5 March 1981 to 18 March 1982 and from 10 June 1982 to 11 July 1983. He also served on the Defense Committee from 11 July 1979 to 11 July 1983. He heavily focused on military and security issues and signed a bill on local police regulations on 12 May 1980, and one on the use of armed forces on 27 April 1983.

Cerquetti was re-elected in 1983 and served on the Elections Committee from 19 July 1983 to 1 July 1987. He also served on the Defense Committee from 12 July 1983 to 1 July 1987. He served on the Italian Parliamentary Delegation to the NATO Parliamentary Assembly from 15 March 1984 to 1 July 1987. After his time in the Chamber of Deputies, he served as Mayor of Cusano Milanino from 1990 to 1994, a period in which he switched from the Italian Communist Party to the Democratic Party of the Left. He ran for re-election in 1994, but experienced conflicts within his party. He was supported by Lega Nord and the Italian People's Party, but failed to be re-elected.

Enea Cerquetti died in Cinisello Balsamo on 21 September 2021 at the age of 83.
