= Filippo Maria Pandolfi =

Italian politician (1927–2025)

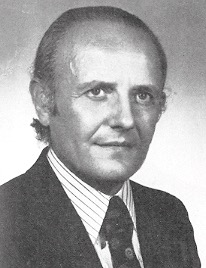

European Commissioner for Science, Research, Development, Telecommunications and Information
- In office 6 January 1989 – 31 December 1992
- President: Jacques Delors
- Preceded by: Karl-Heinz Narjes
- Succeeded by: Antonio Ruberti

Minister of Agriculture
- In office 4 August 1983 – 13 April 1988
- Prime Minister: Bettino Craxi; Amintore Fanfani; Giovanni Goria
- Preceded by: Calogero Mannino
- Succeeded by: Calogero Mannino

Minister of Industry, Commerce and Crafts
- In office 1 December 1982 – 4 August 1983
- Prime Minister: Amintore Fanfani
- Preceded by: Giovanni Marcora
- Succeeded by: Renato Altissimo
- In office 20 December 1980 – 28 June 1981
- Prime Minister: Arnaldo Forlani
- Preceded by: Antonio Bisaglia
- Succeeded by: Giovanni Marcora

Minister of Treasury
- In office 13 March 1978 – 18 October 1980
- Prime Minister: Giulio Andreotti; Francesco Cossiga
- Preceded by: Gaetano Stammati
- Succeeded by: Beniamino Andreatta

Minister of Finance
- In office 30 July 1976 – 13 March 1978
- Prime Minister: Giulio Andreotti
- Preceded by: Gaetano Stammati
- Succeeded by: Franco Maria Malfatti

Member of the Chamber of Deputies
- In office 5 June 1968 – 19 December 1988
- Constituency: Brescia–Bergamo

Personal details
- Born: 1 November 1927 Bergamo, Italy
- Died: 21 March 2025 (aged 97) Bergamo, Italy
- Party: Christian Democracy
- Education: Università Cattolica del Sacro Cuore
- Occupation: Manager

Filippo Maria Pandolfi (1 November 1927 – 21 March 2025) was an Italian politician and prominent member of the Christian Democracy party. A key figure in Italian politics during the latter half of the 20th century, Pandolfi was known for his contributions to economic policy, European integration, and agricultural reforms.

== Early life ==
Filippo Maria Pandolfi was born on 1 November 1927 in Bergamo, Italy, into a middle-class family. His father, a civil engineer and member of the Italian People's Party, was politically active in the Bergamo region, influencing Pandolfi's early exposure to public affairs. Raised in a Catholic household, he joined the Catholic Action (Azione Cattolica) as a young boy, nurturing his lifelong connection to Christian values.

Pandolfi attended the prestigious Liceo Classico Paolo Sarpi in Bergamo, where he developed a passion for ancient Christian literature, opera, classical music, and mountaineering. He shared a schoolbench with Mirko Tremaglia, a future prominent Italian politician. During World War II, Pandolfi joined the Italian Resistance, becoming part of the Youth Front for National Independence and Freedom, aligning himself with the antifascist cause.

After graduating high school, Pandolfi enrolled at the Università Cattolica del Sacro Cuore in Milan, where he earned a degree in philosophy. He briefly taught at the Collegio di Celana in Bergamo before taking on a managerial role at Minerva Italica, a local publishing house focused on educational texts.

== Political career ==
=== Early Political Involvement ===
Pandolfi joined the Christian Democracy (DC) party in 1945, shortly after World War II. His political ascent began in 1950 when Giuseppe Dossetti recruited him as an aide in the party's political secretariat. By 1960, he became the DC secretary in Bergamo, serving as a municipal councilor and majority leader. From 1964 to 1968, he held the position of provincial party secretary, aligning himself with the Dorotei faction, a centrist group within the DC.

==== Parliamentary Service ====
Pandolfi was elected to the Chamber of Deputies in 1968, representing the Brescia-Bergamo constituency. He held this seat continuously until 1988. Known for his elegance, earning the nickname "uomo dei polsini" ("man of the cuffs"), Pandolfi became a leading figure in his district, topping the vote count from 1976 onward. He served in various parliamentary committees, including Finance and Treasury, Constitutional Affairs, Industry, and Foreign Affairs.

==== Government Roles ====
Pandolfi's governmental career began in 1974 when he was appointed Undersecretary of Finance in the Moro governments. In 1976, he became Minister of Finance under Giulio Andreotti and later served as Minister of the Treasury from 1978 to 1980. During his tenure, he introduced significant reforms, such as advance tax payments, and proposed the "Pandolfi Plan" for Italy’s entry into the European Monetary System (EMS). Although his proposal for a "heavy lira" was not adopted, his ideas left a lasting imprint on Italian financial policy.

In 1980, Pandolfi briefly served as Minister of Industry, Commerce, and Crafts under Arnaldo Forlani, before returning to the role in 1982 under Amintore Fanfani. From 1983 to 1988, he was Minister of Agriculture and Forestry, overseeing the implementation of the EU milk quota system in 1984, a controversial move due to underestimated production data. However, he was later cleared of any legal charges related to the issue.

In 1979, Pandolfi was tasked with forming a government, but his failure to secure a majority paved the way for Francesco Cossiga's premiership. Throughout his time in various ministries, Pandolfi was known for his technocratic approach and his close ties to figures such as Bank of Italy Governor Paolo Baffi.

==== European Commissioner ====
In late 1988, Pandolfi resigned from the Italian Parliament to join the European Commission under Jacques Delors. From 6 January 1989 to 31 December 1992, he served as European Commissioner for Science, Research, Development, Telecommunications and Information, also acting as Vice-President of the Commission. He championed initiatives such as the development of high-definition television in Europe, the liberalization of postal services, and fostering research collaboration with Central and Eastern Europe. He also played a key role in negotiating scientific policy with the United States.

== Later life and death ==
After retiring from active politics in 1993, Pandolfi withdrew from public life, though he remained engaged in intellectual circles. He joined the "Group of 10" at the Luigi Sturzo Institute in 2000. He was awarded the title of Knight Grand Cross of the Order of Merit of the Italian Republic in 2003.

Pandolfi died in Bergamo on 21 March 2025, at the age of 97.

== Personal life ==
Pandolfi was known for his refined tastes, including a love for opera and classical music, as well as his mountaineering hobby, which reflected his adventurous spirit. His philosophical background and early teaching career underscored his intellectual depth, which he carried into his political career.

== Electoral history ==
Election	House	Constituency	Party	Votes	Result
1968	Chamber of Deputies	Brescia–Bergamo	DC	41,439	Elected
1972	Chamber of Deputies	Brescia–Bergamo	DC	49,476	Elected
1976	Chamber of Deputies	Brescia–Bergamo	DC	67,448	Elected
1979	Chamber of Deputies	Brescia–Bergamo	DC	85,864	Elected
1983	Chamber of Deputies	Brescia–Bergamo	DC	75,813	Elected
1987	Chamber of Deputies	Brescia–Bergamo	DC	76,388	Elected

== Honors ==
- Knight Grand Cross of the Order of Merit of the Italian Republic (2 May 2003)
