= Nadir Tedeschi =

Italian politician (1930–2021)

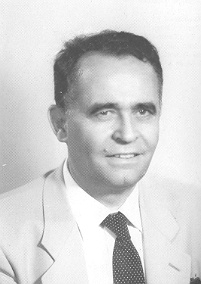
Nadir Tedeschi

Nadir Tedeschi (11 August 1930 – 9 August 2021) was an Italian politician.

== Biography ==
Tedeschi was born in Badia Polesine, Italy, on 11 August 1930. He was secretary of the Christian Democracy party in Milan, and was first elected to the Chamber of Deputies in 1976. Tedeschi was one of four people injured in a 1980 attack carried out by the Red Brigades on Christian Democracy offices in Milan. He won a second term in 1983, serving until 1987. After stepping down from the Italian Parliament, Tedeschi served as a municipal councillor for Trezzano sul Naviglio. He was awarded a Gold Medal for Victims of Terrorism in 2010.
