= Piergiorgio Bressani =

Italian politician (1929–2022)

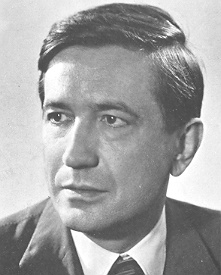
- Bressani in 1970

Mayor of Udine
- In office 29 October 1985 – 10 July 1990
- Preceded by: Angelo Candolini
- Succeeded by: Pietro Zanfagnini

Secretary of the Council of Ministers
- In office 5 August 1979 – 28 June 1981
- Preceded by: Franco Evangelisti
- Succeeded by: Luciano Radi

Member of the Chamber of Deputies of Italy
- In office 16 May 1963 – 15 January 1986
- Constituency: Friuli-Venezia Giulia

Personal details
- Born: 10 June 1929 Udine, Italy
- Died: 3 June 2022 (aged 92) Udine, Italy
- Party: DC

Piergiorgio Bressani (10 June 1929 – 3 June 2022) was an Italian politician. A member of the Christian Democracy party, he served in the Chamber of Deputies from 1963 to 1986. He was also Secretary of the Council of Ministers from 1979 to 1981.

Bressani died in Udine on 3 June 2022 at the age of 92.
