= Nedo Barzanti =

Italian politician (1937–2006)

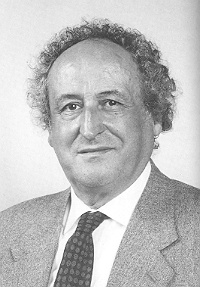

Member of the Chamber of Deputies
- In office 1983–1996

Personal details
- Born: 22 September 1937; Monterotondo Marittimo, Province of Grosseto, Kingdom of Italy
- Died: 10 October 2006 (aged 69); Grosseto, Tuscany, Italy
- Political party: Italian Communist Party; Communist Refoundation Party

Nedo Barzanti (22 September 1937 – 10 October 2006) was an Italian politician who served as a Deputy from 1983 to 1996.
