= Franco Foschi =

Italian politician (1931–2007)

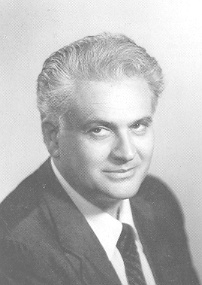

Minister of Labour and Social Security
- In office 4 April 1980 – 18 October 1980
- Prime Minister: Francesco Cossiga; Arnaldo Forlani
- Preceded by: Vincenzo Scotti
- Succeeded by: Michele Di Giesi

Member of the Chamber of Deputies
- In office 5 June 1968 – 14 April 1994

Personal details
- Born: 28 June 1931 Recanati, Marche, Italy
- Died: 16 August 2007 (aged 76) Ancona, Marche, Italy
- Party: Christian Democracy
- Profession: Politician, surgeon, writer

Franco Foschi (28 June 1931 – 17 August 2007) was an Italian surgeon, writer and politician.

== Biography ==
After his high school studies, he enrolled in the faculty of medicine and was particularly interested in neurology and diseases of the nervous system; he was the author of numerous publications in this field and became chief physician and director of mental health services in the province of Ancona; he was also interested in the conditions of workers and was professor of Occupational Medicine in Urbino in his last years of life. Enrolled in the ranks of the Christian Democracy, he was mayor of his hometown from 1960 to 1970, deputy from 1968 to 1994, from the fifth to the eleventh legislature of the Republic, Undersecretary for Labor, Health and Foreign Affairs, Minister of Labor during the Cossiga II government and the Forlani government.

In 1982, as undersecretary, he worked for the return to their homeland of the "desaparecidos" of Italian origin, weaving relationships with the leaders of the Argentine government, strongly linked to the circles of Freemasonry; according to some testimonies, these contacts were at the basis of his registration in the list of members of the Masonic lodge P2. Foschi always proclaimed himself a stranger to the Masonic Lodge and defended himself by asserting that his name had been included in the list without his knowing anything. Although cleared of any collusion with P2, the story marked his political career.

In 1987 he was appointed director of the National Center for Leopardian Studies; under his twenty-year presidency, the Center became a prestigious international institution, collaborating with universities and scholars of every country and promoting Leopardi's work in all nations.

In 2001 he founded and inaugurated the World Poetry Center on the top of the infinity hill in Recanati with the aim of promoting and fostering poetry and culture in any part of the world and in any language and form it can be used.

He remained President of the National Center for Leopardian Studies and the World Poetry Center until his death.

He was also President of AWR, an international non-governmental scientific association based in Vaduz which enjoys consultative status towards the United Nations and the Council of Europe under the patronage of the Prince of Liechtenstein regarding the problems of refugees and migrant workers.
