= Franco Roccella =

Italian politician (1924–1992)

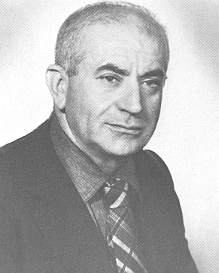

Member of the Chamber of Deputies
- In office 20 June 1979 – 11 July 1983
- In office 11 July 1984 – 1 July 1987

Personal details
- Born: 2 January 1924; Riesi, Sicily
- Died: 22 December 1992 (aged 68)
- Political party: Radical (1955–86); PSI (1986–92)

Francesco Roccella (2 January 1924 – 22 December 1992) was an Italian journalist and politician.

Born in Riesi, Sicily, Roccella was one of the founders of the Radical Party (PR) in 1955. Among the policies he and his party advocated was the legalisation of abortion in Italy. He was elected to the Chamber of Deputies in the 1979 general election, by the Palermo constituency. He failed re-election in 1983, but returned to the chamber in July 1984 after the resignation of Giovanni Negri. In February 1986, he moved to the Italian Socialist Party (PSI), with whom he served the remainder of his term until 1987. From 18 November 1991 to 1 September 1992, he was the mayor of his hometown.

Roccella married the feminist painter Wanda Raheli with whom he had a daughter, Eugenia, who also became a politician and journalist. Briefly a candidate for his party in the late 1970s, she returned to politics in the 2000s espousing social conservative views including opposition to abortion, and was named Minister for Family, Natality and Equal Opportunities in the Meloni Cabinet in 2022.
