= Rosanna Minozzi =

Italian politician

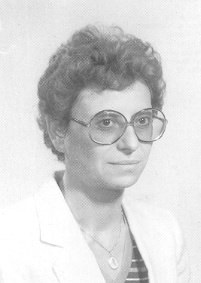
- Minozzi in 1987

Member of the Chamber of Deputies of Italy
- In office 12 July 1983 – 22 April 1992 Serving with see list
- President: Sandro Pertini; Francesco Cossiga
- Prime Minister: Amintore Fanfani; Bettino Craxi; Amintore Fanfani
- Constituency: Firenze-Pistoia

Personal details
- Born: June 18, 1942 (age 84)
- Party: PDS (from 1991)
- Other political affiliations: PCI (until 1991)

Rosanna Minozzi (born 18 June 1942) is a former Italian politician.

A member of the Italian Communist Party (PCI), Minozzi was elected to the Chamber of Deputies (the lower house of the bicameral Italian Parliament) in the 1983 general election, and was re-elected for a second term in 1987. In 1991, after the dissolution of the PCI, Minozzi joined the Democratic Party of the Left (PDS).

In the 1992 election, Minozzi, along with many other PDS members, lost their seats, mainly to minor parties.

== Biography ==
A member of the Italian Communist Party, she served as councilor for public education for the city of Prato from 1976 to 1983, as part of the administration led by Goffredo Landini. She subsequently served as a member of the Chamber of Deputies for two terms, having been elected in the 1983 general election (with 13,750 votes) and in the 1987 general election (with 12,805 votes, taking over for Achille Occhetto, who had been re-elected multiple times).

In 1991, she joined the Democratic Party of the Left.
