= Giovanni Marcora =

Italian businessman, politician and minister

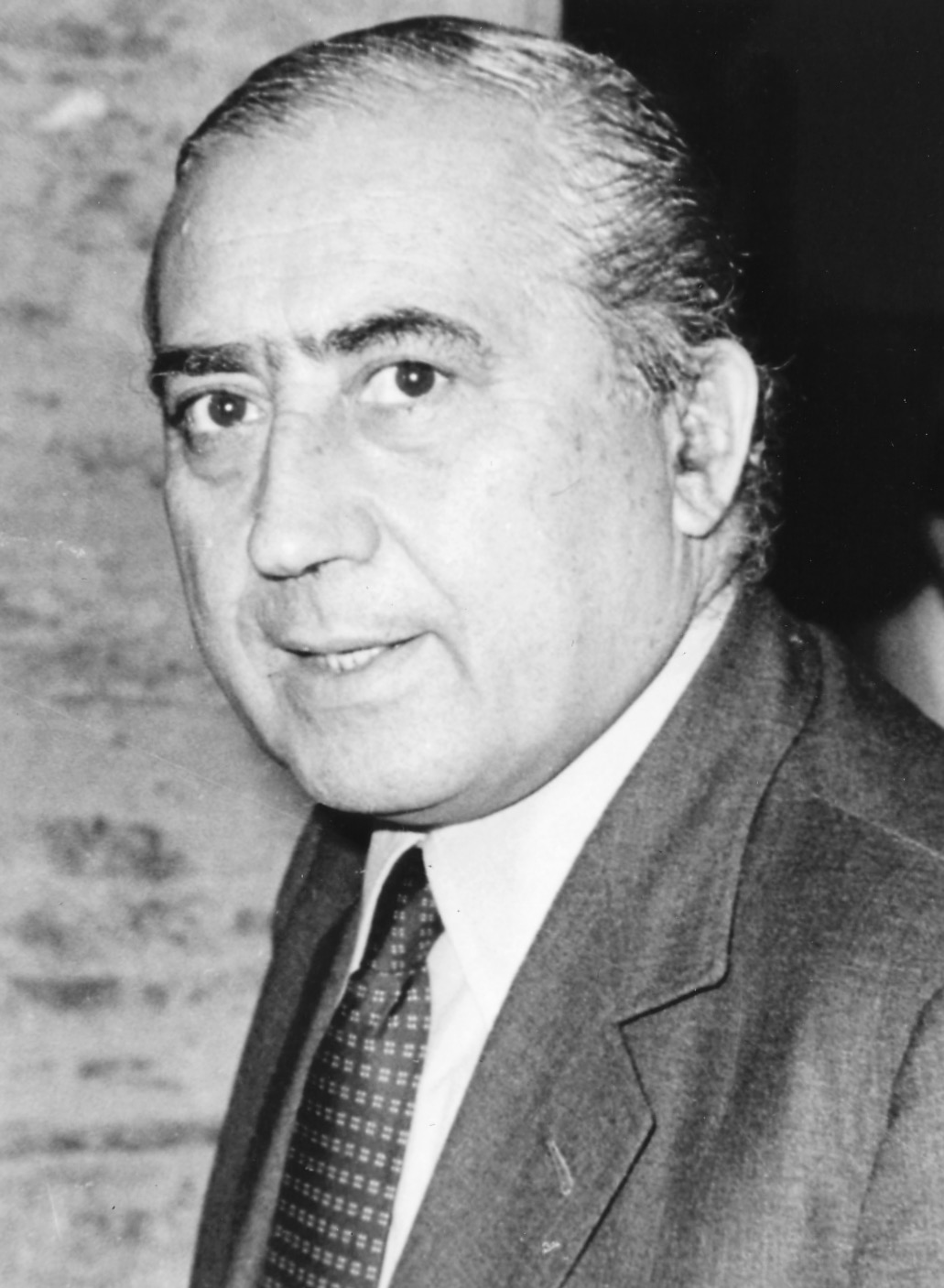

Minister of Agriculture
- In office 1974–1980
- Preceded by: Antonio Bisaglia
- Succeeded by: Giuseppe Bartolomei

Personal details
- Born: 22 December 1922 Inveruno, Italy
- Died: 5 February 1983 (aged 60) Inveruno, Italy
- Party: DC
- Profession: Politician, journalist

Giovanni Marcora (22 December 1922 – 5 February 1983) was an Italian businessman, politician and minister.

== Biography ==
He was born at Inveruno, near Milan. After the Armistice with Italy of 8 September 1943, aged 21, Marcora entered the Italian resistance movement, with the nickname of Albertino, fighting in the province of Milan and the Ossola, and participating in the liberation of Milan on 25 April 1945. He witnessed the order of the liberation from the Church of St. Edward, Busto Arsizio by Don Ambrogio Gianotti.

He was one of the founders of the Christian Democracy (Democrazia Cristiana). He was later appointed as the party's provincial secretary of Milan and vice-secretary national. In 1968, he became senator for the college of Vimercate. Between 1970 and 1975, and from 1980 until his death, he was also mayor of Inveruno.

In 1974, Aldo Moro appointed him as Minister of Agriculture in his cabinet, an office that Marcora held uninterruptedly until 1980, before moving to the Ministry of Industry in 1981–82.

He died at Inveruno of cancer in 1983.

Political offices
Preceded by Antonio Bisaglia	Italian Minister of Agriculture and Forestry; 1974–1980	Succeeded by Giuseppe Bartolomei
Preceded by Filippo Maria Pandolfi	Italian Minister of Trade and Industry; 1981–1982	Succeeded by Calogero Antonio Mannino
