= Vanda Dignani Grimaldi =

Italian politician (1930–2019)

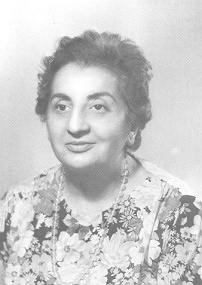

Member of the Chamber of Deputies
- In office 5 July 1983 – 22 April 1992

Personal details
- Born: 25 July 1930; San Severino Marche, Italy
- Died: 18 April 2019 (aged 88); Matelica, Italy
- Political party: Italian Communist Party; Democratic Party of the Left

Vanda Dignani Grimaldi (25 July 1930 – 18 April 2019) was an Italian politician. She was a member of the Chamber of Deputies for the Italian Communist Party and the Democratic Party of the Left. She was the first blind person to serve in the Italian parliament.

== Early life ==
Dignani Grimaldi was born on 25 July 1930 in San Severino Marche, Macerata. She had a sister, Ivana, and she was married to Luigi Grimaldi. She received a university degree in philosophy and worked as a teacher. She was president of the provincial section of the Italian Union of Blind and Partially Sighted People.

== Political career ==
Dignani Grimaldi was elected as a councillor of Macerata in 1990 and re-elected in 1995. She also served as the municipal health councillor for four years.

She was first elected to the Chamber of Deputies on 5 July 1983 as a representative for the Ancona-Pesaro-Macerata-Ascoli Piceno district in the 1983 general election. She was a member of the Italian Communist Party (PCI). She served as a member on the committee of internal affairs. She was the first blind person to serve in the Italian parliament. Dignani Grimaldi was re-elected in the 1987 general election on 26 June 1987 as a member of the PCI, but she changed parties to become a member of the Democratic Party of the Left (PDS) on 13 February 1991 when the PCI was dissolved. She was a member of the PDS for the remainder of her term in office. She was appointed as a member of the committee of social affairs. She left office on 22 April 1992.

== Later life ==
Dignani Grimaldi died on 18 April 2019 in Matelica, at the age of 88.
