= Neide Umidi Sala =

Italian politician

Neide Maria Umidi Sala
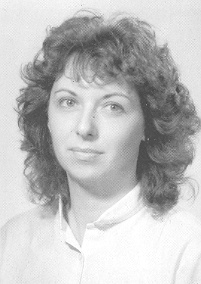

Member of the Chamber of Deputies
- In office 12 July 1983 – 22 April 1992

Personal details
- Born: 21 December 1948 (age 77) Milan, Italy
- Party: Italian Communist Party; Democratic Party of the Left

Neide Maria Umidi Sala (born 21 December 1948) is a former Italian politician. She was a member of the Chamber of Deputies for the Italian Communist Party and the Democratic Party of the Left.

== Early life ==
Sala was born on 21 December 1948 in Milan. She received a diploma in accountancy and worked at the Credito Italiano. She first joined politics as a member of the executive committee of Labour in Milan. She then became a member of the general council of the Italian Federation of Credit Company Employees (FIDAC), before being appointed a member of the national leadership.

== Political career ==
Sala was first elected as a deputy for Milan-Pavia in the Chamber of Deputies on 12 July 1983 in the 1983 general election. She served as a representative for the Italian Communist Party (PCI) and as a member of the committee for finance and the treasury and a member of the parliamentary commission on the community regulations directly applicable in internal law pursuant to Article 189 of the treaty establishing the European Economic Community. She was re-elected in the 1987 general election as a representative for the PCI, but she joined the Democratic Party of the Left (PDS) on 13 February 1991 when the PCI was dissolved. She was secretary of the finance committee and a member of the committee for the supervision of the issue and circulation of banknotes and the committee for the investigation of the mafia and other similar criminal organisations. She left office on 22 April 1992.
