= Michele Di Giesi =

Italian politician (1927–1983)

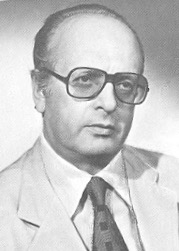
Michele Di Giesi

Michele Di Giesi (4 September 1927 – 20 November 1983) was an Italian politician. He served in the cabinet of Prime Minister Forlani (1980–1981) and Spadolini (1981–1982). He served in the Chamber of Deputies of Italy in Legislature VI (1972–1976), Legislature VII (1976–1979), Legislature VIII (1979–1983) and Legislature IX.

An exponent of the Italian Democratic Socialist Party, Di Giesi has been several times Minister of the Italian Republic.

== Biography ==
In 1970 he was elected regional councilor in Apulia and served vice-president of the center-left junta chaired by Gennaro Trisorio Liuzzi until 1972. Elected for the first time to the Chamber of Deputies on 17 May 1972 (VI Legislature), he was also re-elected in the subsequent elections of 1976, 1979 and 1983.

Di Giesi has served several times as Minister: he was Minister without portfolio with the delegation to Extraordinary interventions in the South in the Andreotti V Cabinet and in the Cossiga I Cabinet, Minister of the post and telecommunications in the Forlani Cabinet, Minister of Labor and Social Security in the Spadolini I and II cabinets and Minister of Merchant Navy in the Fanfani V Cabinet. He refused the post of Minister without portfolio for regional affairs in the Craxi I Cabinet and decided to devote himself to internal life in the PSDI.

He died of a heart attack in his home in Rome at 56 years old.
