= Luciano Radi =

Italian politician (1922–2014)

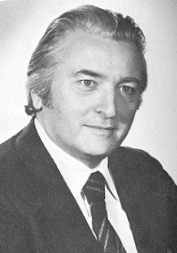
Luciano Radi

Luciano Radi (Foligno, 19 September 1922 – Foligno, 1 June 2014) was an Italian politician and University professor.

== Political career ==
Radi was Deputy from 1958 to 1992 for the "Perugia-Terni-Rieti" district and Senator from 1992 to 1994 for the "Perugia I" district among the ranks of the Christian Democracy.

He served as Secretary of the Council of Ministers from 1980 to 1981 in the Forlani Cabinet and as Minister for Parliamentary Relations from 1981 to 1982 in the first and second Spadolini cabinet.

He was also editor of the newspaper of the Christian Democracy "Il Popolo" from 1980 to 1981 and Chairman of the RAI Supervisory Commission from 1992 to 1994.

== Works ==
- Luciano Radi. Il pendolo composto e le sue leggi. Casa Editrice "L'Appennino", 1948 e Laboratorio Scienze Sperimentali di Foligno (ristampa anastatica), 2010

He has published books of political sociology and contemporary history:

- Luciano Radi. La crisi della pianificazione rigida e centralizzata. Cinque Lune, 1957.
- Luciano Radi. I mezzadri: le lotte contadine dell'italia centrale dall'Unità al 1960. Cinque Lune, 1962.
- Luciano Radi. Potere democratico e forze economiche. Cinque Lune, 1969.
- Luciano Radi. Partiti e classi in Italia. SEI, 1975.
- Luciano Radi. La talpa rossa. Rusconi, 1979.
- Luciano Radi. Tambroni trent'anni dopo. Il Mulino, 1990.
- Luciano Radi. 20 giugno 1859: l'insurrezione e il sacrificio di Perugia. Cittadella Editrice, 1998.
- Luciano Radi. Il futuro è tra noi. Cittadella Editrice, 1998.
- Luciano Radi. La macchina planetaria. Franco Angeli, 2000.
- Luciano Radi. Gli anni giovanili di Giorgio La Pira. Cittadella Editrice, 2001.
- Luciano Radi. La DC da De Gasperi a Fanfani. Rubbettino, 2005.
- Luciano Radi. Gerardo Bruni e la questione cattolica. Provincia di Perugia, 2005.
- Luciano Radi. Foligno 1946. Ricordo di Italo Fittaioli e Benedetto Pasquini in occasione del sessantesimo della prima elezione democratica del Consiglio Comunale. Pro Foligno, 2006.

He has also published the following narration books:

- Luciano Radi. Nati due volte. AVE, 1970.
- Luciano Radi. Buongiorno onorevole. SEI, 1973 (4 edizioni).
- Luciano Radi. Un grappolo di tonache. Rusconi, 1981.
- Luciano Radi. Non sono solo. Rusconi, 1984 (3 edizioni).
- Luciano Radi. Diario di un cane. Bompiani, 1993.
- Luciano Radi. Chiara di Assisi. Cittadella Editrice, 1994.
- Luciano Radi. Angela da Foligno e l'Umbria mistica del secolo XIII. Emp, 1996.
- Luciano Radi. Buonanotte onorevole. SEI, 1996.
- Luciano Radi. Santa Veronica Giuliani. Cittadella Editrice, 1997.
- Luciano Radi. Sotto la brace. ARES, 1999.
- Luciano Radi. San Francesco e gli animali. Editrice Minerva, 2001 (tradotto in più lingue).
- Luciano Radi. Umbria Santa. Editrice Minerva, 2001.
- Luciano Radi. Memorie di una lumaca. Rubbettino, 2002.
- Luciano Radi. San Nicola da Tolentino. Edizioni San Paolo, 2004.
- Luciano Radi. Margherita da Cortona. Cittadella Editrice, 2004.
- Luciano Radi. Luci del tramonto. Rubbettino, 2005.
- Luciano Radi. Francesco e il Sultano. Cittadella Editrice, 2006.
- Luciano Radi. I giorni del silenzio. Minerva editrice, 2010.
