= Giuseppe Azzaro =

Italian lawyer and politician (1925–2022)

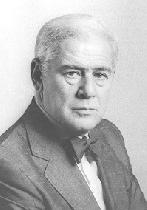

Mayor of Catania
- In office 7 February 1991 – 14 October 1991
- Preceded by: Guido Ziccone
- Succeeded by: Luigi Giusso
- In office 16 December 1987 – 26 December 1988
- Preceded by: Giuseppe Sangiorgio
- Succeeded by: Enzo Bianco

Member of the Chamber of Deputies of Italy
- In office 16 May 1963 – 22 April 1992

Personal details
- Born: 15 October 1925 Caltagirone, Italy
- Died: 5 June 2022 (aged 96) Rome, Italy
- Party: DC
- Occupation: Lawyer

Giuseppe Azzaro (15 October 1925 – 5 June 2022) was an Italian politician.

== Biography ==
A member of the Christian Democracy party, he served in the Chamber of Deputies from 1963 to 1992. He was also Mayor of Catania from 1987 to 1988 and again in 1991.

Azzaro died in Rome on 5 June 2022 at the age of 96.
