= Adolfo Sarti =

Italian politician (1928–1992)

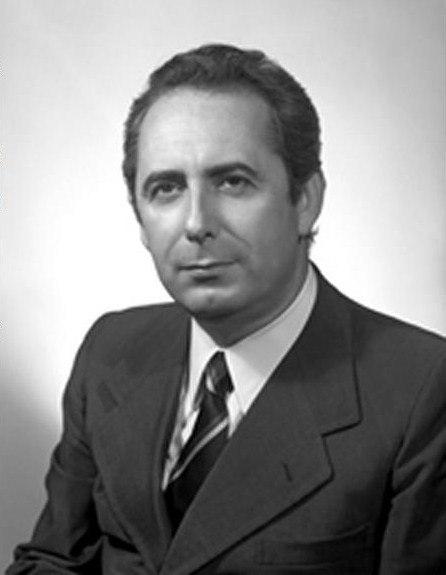
Adolfo Sarti

Adolfo Sarti (19 June 1928 – 2 March 1992) was an Italian Christian Democrat politician. He repeatedly served as Undersecretary and then as Minister in the Italian governments between the 1960s and 1980s. He was a Deputy in Legislature III (1958–1963), Legislature IV (1963–1968), Legislature V (1968–1972), Legislature IX (1983–1987) and Legislature X (1987–1992), while he was a Senator in Legislature VI (1972–1976), Legislature VII (1976–1979) and Legislature VIII (1979–1983).

In 1976 he was Italy's representative to the Council of Europe.

== Biography ==
Adolfo Sarti descended from a family of jurists. Indeed, his great-great-grandfather, Luigi Giuseppe Barbaroux, was Keeper of the Seals of Charles Albert from 1831 to 1840 and author of the first four volumes of the Albertino Codex.

Sarti graduated in law in 1950 and was hired as a secretary at the Cassa di Risparmio di Cuneo. In 1954 he was appointed provincial councilor of the youth section of the Cuneo's Christian Democracy and, in 1956, he was elected national party councilor.

At the age of 30, in 1958, he was first elected deputy on the Christian Democracy list. Repeatedly appointed Undersecretary of State in the Moro, Leone, Rumor, Colombo and Andreotti governments, in 1972 Sarti was appointed Secretary of the Council of Ministers of Italy in the Rumor IV and V governments. He subsequently served as Minister for Tourism in the Moro IV and V governments, as Minister for Relations with Parliament and Minister of Defence in the Cossiga I government, as Minister of Public Education in the Cossiga II government and, finally, as Minister of Grace and Justice in the Forlani government.

On 17 March 1981, as part of the searches in the "Giole" factory offices, owned by the entrepreneur Licio Gelli, for the investigation into the alleged kidnapping of the Sicilian businessman Michele Sindona, a list of almost one thousand members of the P2 Masonic lodge and Adolfo Sarti's application for membership were discovered. The application, supported by the Freemasons brothers Fabrizio Trecca, Roberto Gervaso, Francesco Cosentino and by the then minister Gaetano Stammati, related to 1 September 1977 and contained the wording "Catholic". Precisely for this reason, the very next day, Sarti had withdrawn the application, asking that it never be submitted, so much so that his name was not part of the List of members of the P2. Despite this, the media outcry was such that, on 23 May 1981, Sarti was forced to resign as minister and, three days later, the entire Forlani government (which included two ministers and five undersecretaries included in the list) did the same thing.

Re-elected as deputy in 1987, after having held the position of vice president of the parliamentary group of the D.C., on 18 October 1990 Sarti was elected vice president of the Chamber of Deputies.
