= Aristide Gunnella =

Italian politician (1931–2025)

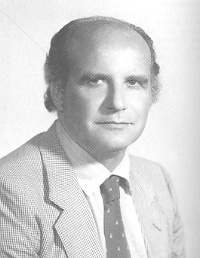

Minister of Regional Affairs
- In office 28 July 1987 – 13 March 1988
- Prime Minister: Giovanni Goria
- Preceded by: Livio Paladin
- Succeeded by: Antonio Maccanico

Personal details
- Born: 18 March 1931 Mazara del Vallo, Italy
- Died: 6 January 2025 (aged 93) Palermo, Sicily, Italy
- Party: Republican Party (until July 1991)

Aristide Gunnella (18 March 1931 – 6 January 2025) was an Italian politician from the Republican Party of which he was a member until July 1991. He was the minister of regional affairs in the period 1987–1988. While he was in active politics, he was considered to be the Republican Party's second in command and "viceroy in Sicily".

== Life and career ==
Gunnella was born in Mazara del Vallo on 18 March 1931 and hailed from a Sicily-based family. He started his career in the 1960s.

From 1968 to 1992 he was a member of the chamber of deputies and was the undersecretary for foreign affairs in the period 1980–1981. He served as the minister of regional affairs between 28 July 1987 and 13 April 1988 in the cabinet led by Prime Minister Giovanni Goria. Gunnella was a member of the Republican party, but resigned from the party in July 1991. In fact, he was expelled from the party due to his close connections with Mafia leaders. Gunnella has had connections with two leading figures of the Sicilian Mafia: Giuseppe Di Cristina and Natale L'Ala. This group managed to increase votes of the Republican party in the region by 50% in the 1978 elections.

Gunnella was a freemason. He is the author of a book entitled Doppio volto della prima Repubblica which was published in 2018.

Gunnella died in Palermo on 6 January 2025, at the age of 93.
