= Giuseppe Caroli =

Italian politician (1931–2025)

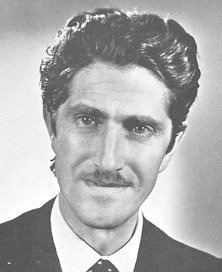
- Caroli in 1970

Member of the Chamber of Deputies
- In office 4 June 1968 – 14 April 1994
- Constituency: Lecce-Taranto

Personal details
- Born: 6 December 1931 Martina Franca, Italy
- Died: 4 December 2025 (aged 93) Martina Franca, Italy
- Party: DC; CCD; FI
- Education: University of Bari
- Occupation: Lawyer

Giuseppe Caroli (6 December 1931 – 4 December 2025) was an Italian politician. A member of Christian Democracy and the Christian Democratic Centre, he served in the Chamber of Deputies from 1968 to 1994.

Caroli died in Martina Franca on 4 December 2025, two days shy of his 94th birthday.
