= Mario Casalinuovo =

Italian politician

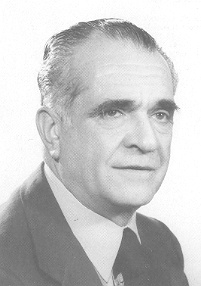

Minister of Transport
- In office 1 December 1982 – 4 August 1983
- Prime Minister: Amintore Fanfani
- Preceded by: Vincenzo Balzamo
- Succeeded by: Claudio Signorile

Member of the Chamber of Deputies
- In office 20 June 1979 – 1 July 1987

Personal details
- Born: 18 May 1922 Catanzaro, Calabria, Italy
- Died: 14 July 2018 (aged 96) Soverato, Calabria, Italy
- Party: Italian Socialist Party
- Children: Aldo Casalinuovo jr.
- Profession: Politician, lawyer, journalist

Mario Casalinuovo (18 May 1922 – 14 July 2018) was an Italian lawyer and politician.

He was the brother of Aldo Casalinuovo, Calabrian criminal lawyer, elected in the I and III legislatures to the Chamber of Deputies for the Block of Freedom and the People's Monarchist Party), for 15 years president of the National Bar Council, and father of Aldo Casalinuovo jr., a criminal lawyer. His father, Giuseppe Casalinuovo, was a Calabrian poet and lawyer.

== Biography ==
Graduated in law, he became a criminal lawyer.

Enrolled in the Italian Socialist Party of Proletarian Unity immediately after returning from captivity on German soil (1945), he joined the division of Palazzo Barberini (1947), first militated in the PSDI and, in 1959 merged with the Unitary Movement of Socialist Initiative in the Italian Socialist Party which had deliberated its autonomist policy in the Venice Congress, after the events in Poland and Hungary.

He was then Secretary of the PSI federation of Catanzaro, member of the Regional Committee, of the Central Committee and of the National Assembly of the Italian Socialist Party until the dissolution of the Party in 1994.

He was the first president of the regional council of Calabria, regional councilor, deputy and president of the parliamentary commission, Undersecretary and Minister.nElected? deputy in the ranks of the PSI in the Italian general elections of 1979 and 1983 (VIII and IX legislature), he was the first socialist deputy from Catanzaro elected since the second postwar period. He served as Undersecretary of the Ministry of Public Works in the I and II Spadolini Governments (1981 – 1982) and of Minister of Transport in the fifth Fanfani government (1982 – 1983).

He was vice president of the parliamentary group of the PSI until 3 July 1981 and, until the same date, he was a member of the Justice Commission of the Chamber of Deputies, participating in the most important debates both on the Government's bills and on the legislative proposals of parliamentary initiative.

He has been involved in forensic associations, covering, among other assignments, the position of national vice president of the Union of Italian Criminal Chambers and that, for eleven years, of president of the criminal chamber of the province of Catanzaro, which he founded with other colleagues in 1988.

He was director for many years of the magazine "Calabria Giudiziaria", founded in 1919 by his father Giuseppe Casalinuovo, and he was a contributor to legal reviews, newspapers and political periodicals. He was also a member of the National Executive Board of the Italian National Press Federation.

He died in 2018 at the age of 96.
