= Legislature IX of Italy =

9th legislature of the Italian Republic (1983–1987)

Legislature IX of Italy IX legislatura della Repubblica Italiana
- 9th legislature

Type
- Type: bicameral
- Houses: Chamber of Deputies; Senate of the Republic

History
- Founded: 12 July 1983
- Disbanded: 1 July 1987 (3 years, 354 days)
- Preceded by: VIII Legislature
- Succeeded by: X Legislature

Leadership
- President of the Senate: Francesco Cossiga (DC) (from 12 July 1983 until 24 June 1985); Amintore Fanfani (DC) (until 17 April 1987); Giovanni Malagodi (PLI)
- President of the Chamber of Deputies: Nilde Iotti, PCI since 12 July 1983

Structure
- Seats: 630 (C); 315 (S)
- Chamber of Deputies political groups: DC (226); PCI (177); PSI (74); MSI (42); PRI (29); PSDI (22); SI (20); PLI (16); Rad (9); DP (7); Mixed (8)
- Senate political groups: DC (121); PCI (92); PSI (40); MSI (18); SI (17); PRI (12); PSDI (9); PLI (6); Mixed (9)

Elections
- Chamber of Deputies voting system: Proportional
- Senate voting system: Proportional
- Last general election: 26 June 1983

Meeting place
- Palazzo Montecitorio, Rome (C)
- Palazzo Madama, Rome (S)

Website
- storia.camera.it/legislature/leg-repubblica-IX www.senato.it/leg9/home

Constitution
- Constitution of Italy

The Legislature IX of Italy (Italian: IX Legislatura della Repubblica Italiana) was the 9th legislature of the Italian Republic, and lasted from 12 July 1983 until 1 July 1987. Its composition was the one resulting from the general election of 26 and 27 June 1983. The election was called by President Sandro Pertini one year before the previous legislature's natural end on 5 May 1983, after a crisis in the incumbent government majority (Pentapartito).

== History ==
The Pentaparty formula, the governative alliance between five centrist parties created in 1981, caused unexpected problems to Christian Democracy (DC). The alliance was fixed and universal, extended both to the national government and to the local administrations. Considering that the 1983 election result did not longer depend by the strength of the DC, but by the strength of the entire Pentapartito, centrist electors began to look at the Christian Democratic vote as not necessary to prevent a Communist success. More, voting for one of the four minor parties of the alliance was seen as a form of moderate protest against the government without giving advantages to the PCI.

In this context, the figure of the socialist leader Bettino Craxi emerged. As leader of Italian Socialist Party (PSI), since 1976 Craxi had tried to undermine the Communist Party, which until then had been continuously increasing its votes in elections, and to consolidate the PSI as a modern, strongly pro-European reformist social-democratic party, with deep roots in the democratic left-wing. This strategy called for ending most of the party's historical traditions as a working-class trade union based party and attempting to gain new support among white-collar and public sector employees.

Even if the PSI never became a serious electoral challenger either to the PCI or the DC, its pivotal position in the political arena allowed it to claim the post of prime minister for Craxi after the 1983 general election. The electoral support for the Christian Democrats was significantly weakened. The PSI threatened to leave the parliamentary majority unless Craxi was made prime minister. The Christian Democrats accepted this compromise to avoid a new election and Craxi became the first Socialist in the history of the Italian Republic to be appointed prime minister.

Starting from 1983, Craxi led the third longest-lived government of Italy during the republican era, being a close ally of two key figures of DC, Giulio Andreotti and Arnaldo Forlani, in a loose cross-party alliance often dubbed CAF. Craxi had a firm grasp on a party previously troubled by factionalism, and tried to distance it from the Communists and to bring it closer to Christian Democrats and other parties. During Craxi's tenure as prime minister, Italy became the fifth largest industrial nation in the world. However, inflation was often in the double digits. Against trade union resistance, Craxi reacted by abolishing wage-price indexation (a mechanism known as scala mobile or "escalator"), under which wages had been increased automatically in line with inflation. Abolishing the escalator system did help reduce inflation, which was also falling in other major countries, but in the long term it inevitably increased industrial action as workers had to bargain for better salaries. In any event, the victory of the "No" campaign in the 1985 referendum called by the Italian Communist Party was a major victory for Craxi.

In domestic policy, a number of reforms were initiated during Craxi's time in office. In 1984, solidarity contracts (work-sharing arrangements to avoid redundancies) were introduced, while restrictions on part-time employment were relaxed. In the field of family welfare, legislation was enacted in 1984 and 1986 that changed the family allowance system "so that people most in need received larger amounts and coverage was progressively reduced to the point of termination once certain income levels were exceeded."

However in April 1987, the secretary of the Christian Democracy Ciriaco De Mita decided to drop his support for Craxi's government. This caused the immediate fall of the cabinet and the formation of a new government led by the long-time Christian Democratic politician Amintore Fanfani to govern the country until a snap election was called. Even though Fanfani was a close friend and ally of Craxi, he did not participate in the swearing in ceremony, sending the Undersecretary to the Presidency of the Council Giuliano Amato.

=== Presidential election ===
On 24 June 1985 the Parliament and the representatives of the 20 Italian regions met to elect the seventh President of Italy. On the same day the christian democrat Francesco Cossiga was elected on the first ballot with 751 votes out of 1011.

== Government ==
Prime Minister	Party	Term of office		Government	Composition
Prime Minister	Party	Took office	Left office	Government	Composition
Bettino Craxi (1934–2000)	Italian Socialist Party	4 August 1983	1 August 1986	Craxi I	DC • PSI • PSDI • PLI • PRI (Pentapartito)
Bettino Craxi (1934–2000)	Italian Socialist Party	1 August 1986	18 April 1987	Craxi II	DC • PSI • PSDI • PLI • PRI (Pentapartito)
Amintore Fanfani (1908–1999)	Christian Democracy	18 April 1987	28 July 1987	Fanfani VI	DC

== Composition ==
=== Chamber of Deputies ===
- President: Nilde Iotti (PCI), elected on 12 July 1983
- Vice presidents: Aldo Aniasi (PSI), Vito Lattanzio (DC), Oscar Luigi Scalfaro (DC, until 4 August 1983), Oddo Biasini (PRI), Giuseppe Azzaro (DC, from 29 September 1983)

Parliamentary groups in the Chamber of Deputies
Initial composition		Final composition		
Parliamentary group	Seats	Parliamentary group	Seats	Change
Christian Democracy	225	Christian Democracy	226	▲1
Italian Communist Party	172	Italian Communist Party	177	▲5
Italian Socialist Party	73	Italian Socialist Party	74	▲1
Italian Social Movement – National Right	42	Italian Social Movement – National Right	42	Steady
Republican	29	Republican	29	Steady
Italian Democratic Socialist Party	23	Italian Democratic Socialist Party	22	▼1
Independent Left	20	Independent Left	20	Steady
		Italian Liberal Party	16	▲16
		Radical Party	9	▲9
		Proletarian Democracy	7	▲7
Mixed	46	Mixed	8	▼38
Sudtirolen Volkspartei	3	Sudtirolen Volkspartei	3	Steady
Valdostan Union – UVP – People's Party	1	Valdostan Union – Popular Democrats – UVP	1	Steady
Liga Veneta	1	Liga Veneta	1	Steady
Italian Liberal Party	16			▼16
Radical Party	11			▼11
Proletarian Democracy	7			▼7
Proletarian Unity Party	6			▼6
Sardinian Action Party	1			▼1
		Non inscrits	3	▲3
Total seats	630	Total seats	630	Steady

=== Senate ===
- President: Francesco Cossiga (DC, until 24 June 1985), elected on 12 July 1983; Amintore Fanfani (DC, until 17 April 1987), elected on 9 July 1985; Giovanni Malagodi (PLI), elected on 22 April 1987
- Vice Presidents: Giorgio De Giuseppe (DC), Libero Della Briotta (PSI, until 10 June 1985), Giglia Tedesco (PCI), Enzo Enriques Agnoletti (SI, until 25 September 1985), Gino Scevarolli (PSI, from 10 July 1985), Adriano Ossicini (SI, from 3 October 1985)

Parliamentary groups in the Senate of the Republic
Initial composition		Final composition		
Parliamentary group	Seats	Parliamentary group	Seats	Change
Christian Democratic	121	Christian Democratic	121	Steady
Communist	90	Communist	92	▲2
Italian Socialist Party	38	Italian Socialist Party	40	▲2
Independent Left	19	Independent Left	17	▼2
Italian Social Movement – National Right	18	Italian Social Movement – National Right	18	Steady
Republican	12	Republican	12	Steady
Italian Democratic Socialist Party	9	Italian Democratic Socialist Party	9	Steady
		Italian Liberal Party	6	▲6
Mixed	15	Mixed	9	▼6
South Tyrolean People's Party	3	South Tyrolean People's Party	2	▼1
Valdostan Union	1	Valdostan Union	1	Steady
Liga Veneta	1	Liga Veneta	1	Steady
Sardinian Action Party	1	Sardinian Action Party	1	Steady
Radical Party	1	Radical Party	1	Steady
Italian Liberal Party	6			▼6
Non inscrits	1	Non inscrits	2	▲1
Total seats	322	Total seats	324	▲2

==== Senators for Life ====
Senator	Motivation	Appointed by	From	Till
Cesare Merzagora	Merits in the social field	President Antonio Segni	Previous legislature	Next legislature
Giuseppe Saragat	Former President of Italy	ex officio	Previous legislature	Next legislature
Amintore Fanfani	Merits in the social field	President Giovanni Leone	Previous legislature	Next legislature
Giovanni Leone	Former President of Italy	ex officio	Previous legislature	Next legislature
Leo Valiani	Merits in the social field	President Sandro Pertini	Previous legislature	Next legislature
Eduardo De Filippo	Merits in the literary and artistic field	President Sandro Pertini	Previous legislature	31 October 1984 (deceased)
Camilla Ravera	Merits in the social field	President Sandro Pertini	Previous legislature	Next legislature
Carlo Bo	Merits in the literary field	President Sandro Pertini	18 July 1984	Next legislature
Norberto Bobbio	Merits in the social and scientific field	President Sandro Pertini	18 July 1984	Next legislature
Sandro Pertini	Former President of Italy	ex officio	29 June 1985	Next legislature
