= Mario Gargano =

Italian politician (1929–2018)

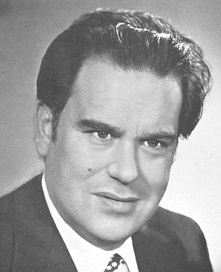
Picture of Mario Gargano

Mario Gargano (20 May 1929 – 11 July 2018) was an Italian politician who served as a Deputy from 1972 to 1983.
