= Guido Bodrato =

Italian politician (1933–2023)

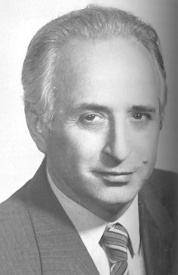
- Bodrato in 1983

Minister of Industry, Commerce and Craftsmanship
- In office 12 April 1991 – 28 June 1992
- Prime Minister: Giulio Andreotti
- Preceded by: Adolfo Battaglia
- Succeeded by: Giuseppe Guarino

Minister of Budget
- In office 2 December 1982 – 29 April 1983
- Prime Minister: Amintore Fanfani
- Preceded by: Giorgio La Malfa
- Succeeded by: Pietro Longo

Minister of Public Education
- In office 18 October 1980 – 1 December 1982
- Prime Minister: Arnaldo Forlani; Giovanni Spadolini
- Preceded by: Adolfo Sarti
- Succeeded by: Franca Falcucci

Member of the European Parliament
- In office 20 July 1999 – 19 July 2004
- Constituency: North-West Italy

Member of the Chamber of Deputies
- In office 5 June 1968 – 14 April 1994
- Constituency: Turin

Personal details
- Born: 27 March 1933 Monteu Roero, Italy
- Died: 8 June 2023 (aged 90) Chieri, Italy
- Party: DC (until 1994); PPI (1994–2002); DL (2002–2007)
- Education: University of Turin
- Profession: Politician, economist

Guido Bodrato (27 March 1933 – 8 June 2023) was an Italian politician.

== Biography ==
Bodrato was born in Monteu Roero, in Piedmont, and graduated in jurisprudence. He entered Christian Democracy (Democrazia Cristiana, or DC) and was elected in the Italian Chamber of Deputies for that party from 1968 to 1994. He was also municipal councillor in Turin. Together with Carlo Donat-Cattin, he was a leader of DC's Forze Nuove internal wing (a left wing), and later, as a collaborator of Benigno Zaccagnini, a founder of the so-called Area Zac with Mino Martinazzoli and others.

Bodrato was Minister of Education from 1980 and 1982 (Forlani and Spadolini I/II cabinets), then, in 1982-1983, Minister of Economic Balance in the Fanfani V cabinet. After a period as DC's vice-secretary under Ciriaco De Mita and then Arnaldo Forlani, he was again minister, this time of Industry and Commerce, in 1991-1992 (Andreotti VII Cabinet).

During the Mani Pulite scandal that wiped out DC and other Italian traditional government parties, he supported the renovation of new secretary Mino Martinazzoli, and the foundation of the new Italian People's Party (Partito Popolare Italiano, PPI). From 1996 to 1999 he was director of the party's newspaper Il Popolo. Bodrato was elected in the PPI's lists at the European Parliament in 1999-2004.

Bodrato died on 8 June 2023, at the age of 90.

== Electoral history ==
Election	House	Constituency	Party	Votes	Result
1968	Chamber of Deputies	Turin–Novara–Vercelli	DC	30,326	Elected
1972	Chamber of Deputies	Turin–Novara–Vercelli	DC	39,935	Elected
1976	Chamber of Deputies	Turin–Novara–Vercelli	DC	43,890	Elected
1979	Chamber of Deputies	Turin–Novara–Vercelli	DC	46,101	Elected
1983	Chamber of Deputies	Turin–Novara–Vercelli	DC	48,883	Elected
1987	Chamber of Deputies	Turin–Novara–Vercelli	DC	51,294	Elected
1992	Chamber of Deputies	Turin–Novara–Vercelli	DC	17,439	Elected
1999	European Parliament	North-West Italy	PPI	40,422	Elected
