= Giuseppe Bartolomei =

Italian politician (1923–1996)

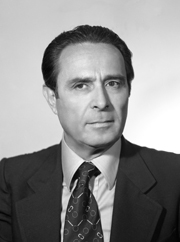

Minister of Agriculture
- In office 18 October 1980 – 1 August 1982
- Prime Minister: Arnaldo Forlani; Giovanni Spadolini
- Preceded by: Giovanni Marcora
- Succeeded by: Calogero Mannino

Member of the Senate
- In office 16 May 1963 – 11 July 1983

Personal details
- Born: 12 January 1923 Anghiari, Tuscany, Italy
- Died: 28 September 1996 (aged 73) Rome, Lazio, Italy
- Party: DC
- Profession: Politician

Giuseppe Bartolomei (12 January 1923 – 28 September 1996) was an Italian politician.

He was municipal councilor in Arezzo; in 1961, he became head of the secretariat of the Prime Minister Amintore Fanfani.

Bartolomei was elected Senator in 1963 and held office until 1983; during his parliamentary activity he was Chairman of the DC senators from July 1973 to October 1980. He also served as Minister of Agriculture and Forests in the Forlani Cabinet and in the two Spadolini Cabinets.

At the end of his experience in Parliament, he assumed the role of president of Banca Toscana, which he maintained until a few months before his death in September 1996.

== Bibliography ==
- Giuseppe Bartolomei. Coscienza cristiana e responsabilità democratica: riflessioni politiche lungo i sentieri del Novecento , a cura di Omar Ottonelli, Firenze, Polistampa, 2013.
