= Antonio Bisaglia =

Italian politician (1929–1984)

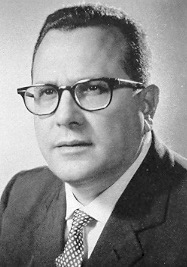

Senator of the Italian Republic
- In office 20 July 1979 – 1 July 1987

Member of Italian Chamber of Deputies
- In office 28 April 1963 – 19 June 1979
- Constituency: Verona

Personal details
- Born: 31 March 1929 Rovigo, Veneto, Italy
- Died: 24 June 1984 (aged 55) Santa Margherita Ligure, Genoa, Italy
- Citizenship: Italy
- Party: Christian Democrats
- Education: University of Padua
- Profession: Insurer

Antonio Bisaglia (31 March 1929 – 24 June 1984) was an Italian politician, a member of Christian Democracy (Democrazia Cristiana, or DC).

== Biography ==
He was born in Rovigo on 31 March 1929 to a railway worker. He entered Azione Cattolica and in 1951 became national counsellor of Christian Democracy's youth movement. Bisaglia graduated in law at the University of Padua and began working as an insurer.

=== Political career ===
In 1963 Bisaglia was elected for DC in the Italian Chamber of Deputies, a position he held until 1979, when he became a Senator. He was confirmed in the Italian Senate at the 1983 general elections. Bisaglia held government positions for some eight years starting from 1972: he was Minister of Agriculture in Rumor V Cabinet, Minister of State Controlled Agencies in Moro IV, Moro V, Andreotti III, IV and V cabinets, and Minister of Industry in the first and second Cossiga governments, as well as in the Forlani government of 1980.

Bisaglia began his national career as a collaborator and assistant of fellow Veneto DC politician Mariano Rumor. The alliance between the two fell in 1975, when Bisaglia, with the help of Flaminio Piccoli (DC leader from Trentino), put Rumor among the minority in the Dorotei faction within DC (which Rumor had himself founded). Bisaglia would gain a reputation for being a skilled organizer and leader of the Christian Democrats. Facing pressure from the growing interest in northern regionalism, he attempted to incorporate the movement into the DC structure through a model based on the Christian Social Union in Bavaria, but several of his fellow Christian Democrats opposed it. Other Christian Democrats would later take up the cause and, in many cases, join the Liga Veneta.

In 1980, following revelations from the Italian Social Movement senator Giorgio Pisanò, Bisaglia became embroiled in a scandal connected to oil affairs, together with Sereno Freato, former secretary of Aldo Moro (DC national leader – as well as main member of the Dorotei – and Italy's prime minister, who had been killed by the Red Brigades in 1978). During a session of the Italian Parliament, Pisanò read a letter by political gossip journalist Mino Pecorelli in which he asked for money from Bisaglia. Pecorelli had been killed by the Mafia a few years before, and was also involved in the Moro affair, as well as in numerous others connected to DC leader Giulio Andreotti, the masonic lodge Propaganda 2, and the Italian Secret Services. DC forced Bisaglia to resign from the government in December 1980.

=== Death ===
Bisaglia died in obscure circumstances on 24 June 1984. According to the official reconstruction, he fell into the sea from his boat off the coast of Santa Margherita Ligure. Bisaglia was president of the DC senators' caucus at the time, and was still undergoing investigation for his alleged role in the 1980 oil scandal. There was no autopsy performed on Bisaglia's body, which according to some sources was due to orders given by the then Senate President, Francesco Cossiga. Bisaglia's body was diagnosed to have "immediately drowned", although the sea was calm and he was a good swimmer, which led some observers to find the reported cause of death dubious.

His brother Don Mario, a priest, also drowned in 1992 in a lake near Domegge. At the time, he was investigating the former minister's death and, according to one reconstruction, had come to Cadore to ask the pope (who was on vacation in the area) for dispensation from the confessional seal to reveal what he had discovered. Other people who were also sojourning in Cadore when the priest died included Giulio Andreotti, Francesco Cossiga and Propaganda 2 Grand Master, Licio Gelli.

Bisaglia's former personal secretary, Gino Mazzolaio, died in the same circumstances in the Adige River the following year. Another person connected to Bisaglia who also died in similarly mysterious circumstances was Ugo Niutta, whom the minister had chosen as boss of Farmitalia and who shared with him knowledge of several Propaganda 2 affiliates: he officially committed suicide in London just four months after Bisaglia's death and two years following that of his cognizant Roberto Calvi, a banker whose suicide was simulated in that city by order of Michele Sindona, a criminal associated with Andreotti.

== Sources ==
- Pansa, Giampaolo (1975). Bisaglia, una carriera democristiana. Milan: SugarCo Edizioni.
- Brambilla, Carlo; Daniele Vimercati. Gli annegati - Il giallo dei Bisaglia e altri misteri. Baldini&Castoldi.
