= Independent Left (Italy) =

Independent Left Sinistra Indipendente
- Founded: 1968
- Dissolved: 1992
- Ideology: Democratic socialism
- Political position: Left-wing

The Independent Left (Italian: Sinistra indipendente) was an Italian parliamentary group in the Italian Senate between 1968 and 1992. Its forerunner was the Democrats of the Left group which was active between 1948 and 1953 and formed by independent leftist senators elected into the Popular Democratic Front. A group of Independent Democrats of the Left then existed from 1953 to 1963.

The Independent Left was created by the Italian Communist Party with the goal to reinforce its leadership over the Italian left after the passage of the Italian Socialist Party to an alliance with the centrist Christian Democracy. The group was formed by past members of the Socialist Party, actors, judges, and many leftist Catholics who did not become full members of the Communist Party because it was seen as an atheist organization.

The senators belonging to the group were elected into the Communist lists, so this group ceased to exist after the disbandment of the PCI in 1991.

== See also ==
- Independent Left (France)
