= Virginio Rognoni =

Italian politician (1924–2022)

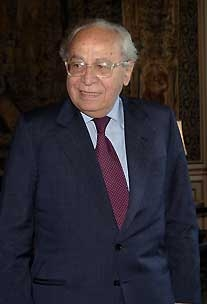

Vice president of CSM
- In office 2 August 2002 – 1 August 2006
- Preceded by: Giovanni Verde
- Succeeded by: Nicola Mancino

Minister of Defence
- In office 27 July 1990 – 28 June 1992
- Prime Minister: Giulio Andreotti
- Preceded by: Mino Martinazzoli
- Succeeded by: Salvo Andò

Minister of Justice
- In office 1 August 1986 – 28 July 1987
- Prime Minister: Bettino Craxi; Amintore Fanfani
- Preceded by: Mino Martinazzoli
- Succeeded by: Giuliano Vassalli

Minister of the Interior
- In office 13 June 1978 – 4 August 1983
- Prime Minister: Giulio Andreotti; Francesco Cossiga; Arnaldo Forlani; Giovanni Spadolini; Amintore Fanfani
- Preceded by: Francesco Cossiga
- Succeeded by: Oscar Luigi Scalfaro

Member of the Chamber of Deputies
- In office 5 June 1968 – 14 April 1994
- Constituency: Milan-Pavia

Personal details
- Born: 5 August 1924 Corsico, Lombardy, Italy
- Died: 20 September 2022 (aged 98) Pavia, Lombardy, Italy
- Party: DC (1960–1994); PPI (1994–2002); The Daisy (2002–2007); PD (2007–2022)
- Education: University of Pavia; Yale University
- Profession: Lawyer

Virginio Rognoni (5 August 1924 – 20 September 2022) was an Italian politician, who was a prominent member of Christian Democracy. He was several times Interior Minister, Minister of Defense and Minister of Justice. From 2002 to 2006 he was vice-president of the High Council of the Judiciary.

== Biography ==
As a student at the historic Collegio Ghislieri, in November 1947 he obtained a degree in law from the University of Pavia. He studied at Yale University between 1949 and 1950 and also worked as a lawyer.

Rognoni began his political career in local government, serving as a city councillor in Pavia from 1960 to 1964, and from 1964 to 1967 as deputy mayor and as councillor for town planning. He then entered national politics, and was elected member of the Chamber of Deputies for seven consecutive terms (1968–1994).

Rognoni was Minister of the Interior from 1978 to 1983, of Justice (1986–1987) and Minister of Defence (1990–1992): he faced the terrorism and he solved the kidnapping of James Lee Dozier by the hand of Brigate Rosse. He was criticized by the Italian Communist Party while Minister of the Interior for failing to protect General Carlo Alberto Dalla Chiesa, who was killed on the same day in which he asked Rognoni to meet him.

From 2002 until he retired in 2006 he was vice-president of the High Council of the Judiciary (Consiglio Superiore della Magistratura).

Rognoni died in Pavia on 20 September 2022, at the age of 98.
