= Claudio Signorile =

Italian politician (born 1937)

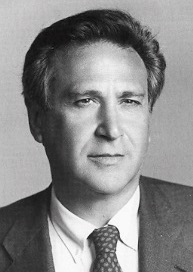

Minister of transport
- In office 4 August 1983 – 17 April 1987
- Prime Minister: Bettino Craxi
- Preceded by: Mario Casalinuovo
- Succeeded by: Giovanni Travaglini

Minister for Extraordinary Interventions in the South
- In office 28 June 1981 – 3 August 1983
- Prime Minister: Giovanni Spadolini
- Preceded by: Nicola Capria
- Succeeded by: Salverino De Vito

Member of the Chamber of Deputies
- In office 25 May 1972 – 14 April 1994

Personal details
- Born: 9 September 1937 (age 88) Bari, Italy
- Party: PSI (1956–1994); US (2004–2005); SDI (2005–2007); AR (2007)
- Profession: Politician, University professor

Claudio Signorile (born 9 September 1937) is an Italian politician.

== Biography ==
Claudio Signorile graduated with a degree in literature and taught modern history at the universities of Rome and Sassari, and contemporary history at the University of Lecce. He was a member of the Italian Socialist Party (Partito Socialista Italiano; PSI) from 1956 to 1994, becoming national secretary of the Socialist Youth Federation (until 1965) and then, as a member of the National Party Directorate, deputy secretary of the party from 1978 to 1981.

Following the kidnap of Christian Democracy politician Aldo Moro by the far-left terrorist group the Red Brigades (Brigate Rosse, BR) in March 1978, Signorile became involved in clandestine attempts to develop lines of communication between his party and BR, with the intention of securing Moro's release. Although always remaining within the confines of the law, Signorile contacted Marxist intellectuals sympathetic to BR, most notably Franco Piperno and Lanfranco Pace, and reported the outcomes of their discussions to the then leader of the PSI, Bettino Craxi. As Signorile later stated during the investigation into Moro's murder: "We wanted an open door and a possibility that I would not call trattativa (negotiation) – I want to be very clear on this – a possibility to create conditions of fact that would leave, I repeat, at least a road open to the possibility of releasing the Honourable Moro."

From 1981 to 1983, he was minister for extraordinary interventions in the South in the Spadolini and Fanfani governments. From 1983 to 1987, he served as minister of transport in the governments led by Bettino Craxi. In 1988 he was one of the protagonists of the so-called "golden sheet scandal". He was accused, together with his secretary Rocco Trane, of having received bribes of 720 million lire for the award of a contract for the supply of linen destined for the sleeping cars of Ferrovie dello Stato. He was indicted and subsequently acquitted in 1996.

In 1994, he was expelled from the PSI.

In 2004, Signorile founded the Socialist Unity movement, while in 2005 he joined the new radical-socialist project "Rose in the Fist".

In 2007, he joined the Reformist Alliance of Ottaviano Del Turco, to promote the participation of a group of socialists in the constituent phase of the Democratic Party.
