= Giuseppe Amadei =

Italian politician (1919–2020)

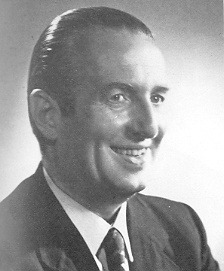
Giueppe Amadei

Giuseppe Amadei (18 March 1919 – 6 November 2020) was an Italian politician who served as a Deputy.

A native of Guastalla, Reggio-Emilia, he was a high school teacher before becoming a member (after WWII) of the first council of Guastalla, councillor for education, as well as secretary of the local section of the Socialist Party of Proletarian Unity and advisor to the Venetian Society. In 1953, he became provincial secretary of the Reggio federation of the PSDI and a member of the national council of the party. In the same year, he was appointed private secretary and head of the secretariat of the Minister of Posts and Telecommunications, Alberto Simonini (1896-1960). After Simonini's death in 1960, Amadei became a member of Parliament, in office for eight legislatures (until 1989).

== Family ==
Married to Sconosciuta Amadei; they were the parents of one child.

== Death ==
Amadei died at age 101 at Santa Maria Nuova in Reggio, where he had been hospitalized.
