= Giuseppe Gargani =

Italian politician (1935–2026)

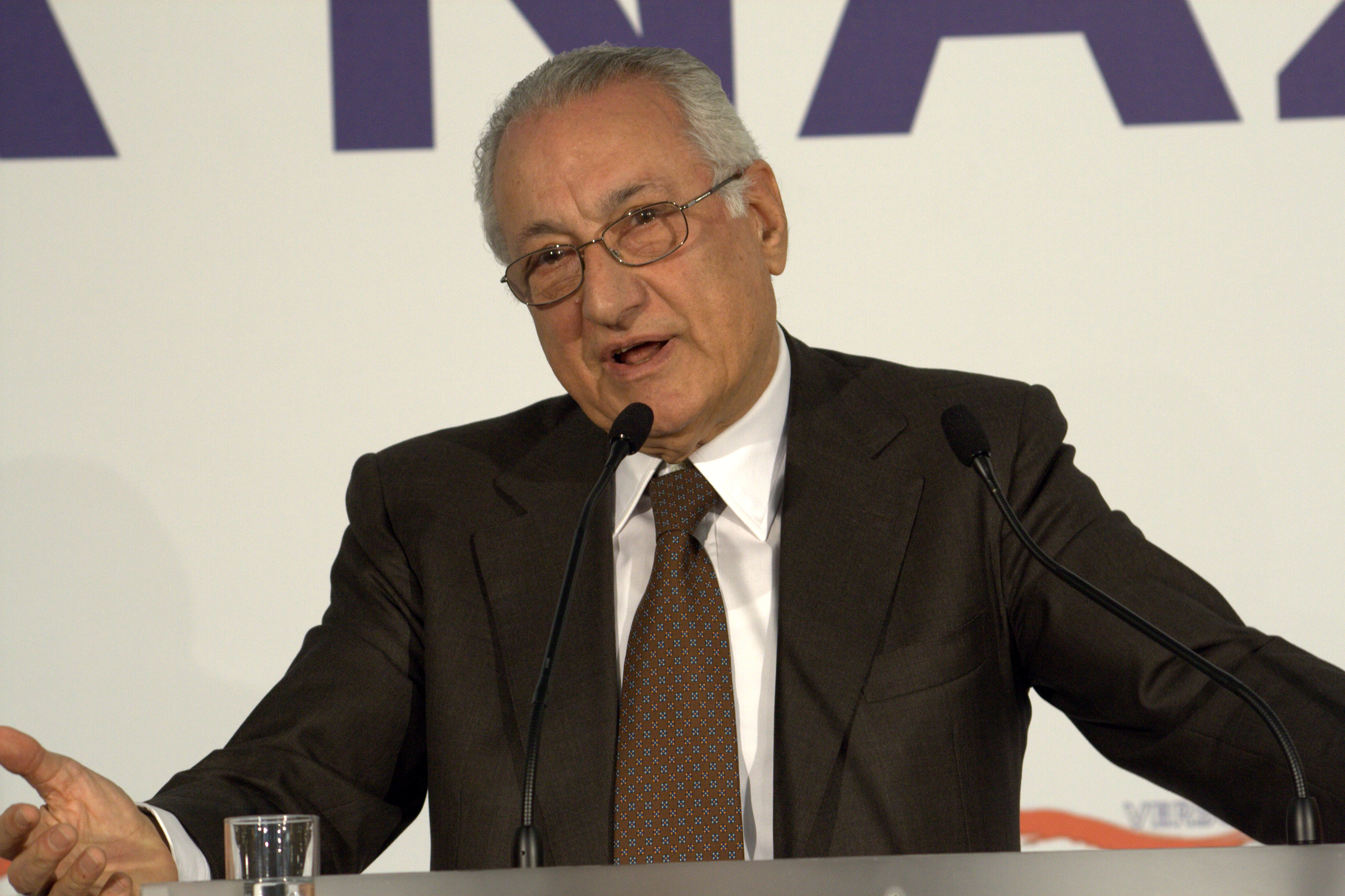
Gargani in 2010

Giuseppe Gargani (23 April 1935 – 27 May 2026) was an Italian politician and lawyer. From 1999 to 2009 he served as a Member of the European Parliament. He was elected on the Forza Italia ticket and sat with the European People's Party group. In the June 2009 elections Gargani came in 10th with 79,479 votes on the PdL list where only nine were elected.

== Life and career ==
Gargani was born in Morra De Sanctis on 23 April 1935.

He was president of the Province of Avellino (1970–1972). Subsequently, he was a member of the Italian parliament until 1994 and was Under-Secretary-of-State at the Ministry of Justice (1979–1983).

On 23 July 2004, he was elected Chair of the Committee on Legal Affairs.

Giuseppe Gargani died on 27 May 2026, at the age of 91.
