= Vincenzo Balzamo =

Italian politician (1929–1992)

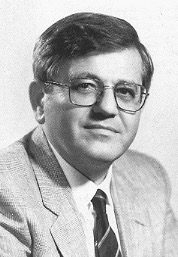
Vincenzo Balzamo

Vincenzo Balzamo (April 3, 1929 – November 2, 1992) was an Italian politician, a member of the Italian Socialist Party.

== Biography ==
He was born in Colli a Volturno, Province of Isernia, Molise, and served as mayor of his birthplace from 1965 to 1973.

He was elected MP of the Brescia-Bergamo constituency in 1972 and was subsequently re-elected for five other legislatures until 1992, the year of his death.

He served as minister for the coordination of initiatives for scientific and technological research in 1980 and as minister of transport from 1981 to 1982.

On 15 October 1992, in the midst of the Tangentopoli scandal, he received a notice of guarantee from the Milanese judges during the "Mani Pulite" investigation, in which he was accused of having violated the law on public funding of political parties and to have been, for the position he held within the party, the recipient of bribes reserved for the Socialist Party.

Stricken with extensive myocardial infarction and urgently operated on 26 October 1992, Balzamo died at the San Raffaele Hospital in Milan on 2 November 1992 at the age of 63, before a trial could begin against him.

== Publications ==
- Diritti civili e libertà democratiche (Marsilio Editori)
- Ordine pubblico e sicurezza democratica (Ed. La Nuova Italia)
- Cittadini in uniforme (Lerici)
- I trasporti: dalle idee ai fatti (Ed. Colombo)
- Opinioni a confronto (Ed. Capitol)
- Eversione, democrazia e rinnovamento dello Stato (Ed. Teti)
- Una società in cammino (Ed. Colombo)
- I giorni difficili della Repubblica (SugarCo Edizioni)
