= Nicola Capria =

Italian politician (1932–2009)

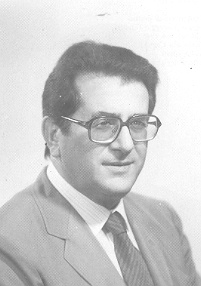

Minister for the Coordination of Civil Protection
- In office 12 April 1991 – 28 June 1992
- Prime Minister: Giulio Andreotti
- Preceded by: Vito Lattanzio
- Succeeded by: Ferdinando Facchiano

Minister of Tourism and Entertainment
- In office 1 August 1986 – 17 April 1987
- Prime Minister: Bettino Craxi
- Preceded by: Lelio Lagorio
- Succeeded by: Mario Di Lazzaro

Minister of Foreign Trade
- In office 28 June 1981 – 1 August 1986
- Prime Minister: Giovanni Spadolini; Amintore Fanfani; Bettino Craxi
- Preceded by: Enrico Manca
- Succeeded by: Rino Formica

Member of the Chamber of Deputies
- In office 5 July 1976 – 14 April 1994

Personal details
- Born: 6 November 1932 Rosarno, Calabria, Italy
- Died: 31 January 2009 (aged 76) Rome, Lazio, Italy
- Party: PSI
- Profession: Politician, lawyer

Nicola Capria (6 November 1932 – 31 January 2009) was an Italian politician, member of the Italian Socialist Party.

He was a deputy from 1976 to 1994 and served also as a minister several times from 1986 to 1992 in the governments led by Spadolini, Fanfani, Craxi and Andreotti.

He was also city councilor in Messina, Vice-president of the Sicily Region, regional deputy to the Sicilian Regional Assembly and regional secretary of the Sicilian PSI.

During the 1991–1993 eruption of Mount Etna, as Italy's Minister of Civil Protection, Capria oversaw national emergency efforts and commented on Operation Hot Rock, describing the attempt to divert lava from the town of Zafferana Etnea as an "uneven struggle" against a powerful "monster" of nature.

He resigned as parliamentary leader of the PSI when, on 12 January 1994, the prosecutor's office of the Republic of Messina notified him of a guarantee notice in the context of investigations into the Sirap affair for external competition in mafia association. From that moment, although fulfilled with a full formula, because the fact does not exist, he definitively closed all relations with the world of politics.

He died in Rome on 31 January 2009, at the age of 76.
