= List of members of the Senate of Italy, 1987–1992 =

This is a list of the 325 members of the 10th legislature of the Italian Senate that were elected in the 1987 general election. The legislature met from 2 July 1987 to 22 April 1992.

Senators for life are marked with a "(L)"

== Christian Democracy ==
- Nicola Mancino
- Francesco Mazzola
- Gianfranco Aliverti
- Claudio Beorchia
- Ivo Butini
- Gian Carlo Ruffino
- Francesco Patriarca
- Elio Fontana
- Luciano Bausi
- Luciano Bausi
- Vittorino Colombo
- Marino Cortese
- Giuseppe Giacovazzo
- Giuseppe Guzzetti
- Manlio Ianni
- Francesco Patriarca
- Andrea Zangara
- Lorenzo Cappelli
- Domenico Raffaello Lombardi
- Germano De Cinque
- Cesare Golfari
- Lucio Abis
- Lorenzo Acquarone
- Giovanni Amabile
- Antonio Andò
- Beniamino Andreatta
- Giulio Andreotti (L)
- Alcide Angeloni
- Carmelo Azzarà
- Giovanni Azzaretti
- Enzo Berlanda
- Mario Viganò
- Guido Bernardi
- Carlo Bo (L)
- Carlo Boggio
- Adriano Bompiani
- Gilberto Bonalumi
- Cirillo Bonora
- Manfredi Bosco
- Attilio Busseti
- Severino Fallucchi
- Paolo Cabras
- Umberto Cappuzzo
- Guido Carli
- Natale Carlotto
- Gianuario Carta
- Francesco Cattanei
- Anna Gabriella Ceccatelli
- Michele Chimenti
- Severino Citaristi
- Giovanni Silvestro Coco
- Mario Condorelli
- Francesco Alberto Covello
- Romualdo Coviello
- Sergio Cuminetti
- Saverio D'Amelio
- Costante Degan
- Emilio Neri
- Giorgio De Giuseppe
- Gabriele De Rosa
- Salverino De Vito
- Alfredo Diana
- Osvaldo Di Lembo
- Corradino Di Stefano
- Carlo Donat-Cattin
- Gianfranco Chessa
- Angelo Donato
- Leopoldo Elia
- Umberto Emo Capodilista
- Franco Evangelisti
- Pietro Fabris
- Franca Falcucci
- Amintore Fanfani (L)
- Mauro Favilla
- Mario Ferrari-Aggradi
- Mario Fioret
- Alessandro Fontana
- Giovanni Angelo Fontana
- Ignazio Marcello Gallo
- Luigi Genovese
- Delio Giacometti
- Franco Pilla
- Antonio Giagu Demartini
- Luigi Granelli
- Niccolò Grassi Bertazzi
- Antonio Graziani
- Mauro Ianniello
- Rosa Jervolino Russo
- Bruno Kessler
- Alberto Robol
- Michele Lauria
- Ezio Leonardi
- Nicolò Lipari
- Giovanni Manzini
- Giovanni Battista Melotto
- Pietro Mezzapesa
- Paolo Micolini
- Pietro Montresori
- Giampaolo Mora
- Maria Fida Moro
- Antonino Murmura
- Gualtiero Nepi
- Giovanni Maria Nieddu
- Giulio Cesare Orlando
- Antonino Pagani
- Francesco Parisi
- Angelo Pavan
- Francesco Perina
- Pasquale Perugini
- Angelo Picano
- Michele Pinto
- Luigi Poli
- Giorgio Postal
- Giovanni Prandini
- Emilio Pulli
- Francesco Rebecchini
- Walter Fontana
- Augusto Rezzonico
- Domenico Rosati
- Roberto Ruffilli
- Carlo Tani
- Mariano Rumor
- Vielmo Duò
- Carmelo Francesco Salerno
- Franco Salvi
- Carmelo Santalco
- Learco Saporito
- Paolo Sartori
- Giorgio Spitella
- Francesco Tagliamonte
- Paolo Emilio Taviani (L)
- Lucio Toth
- Riccardo Triglia
- Antonio Ventre
- Giovanni Venturi
- Ernesto Vercesi
- Maria Paola Colombo Svevo
- Glicerio Vettori
- Claudio Vitalone
- Benigno Zaccagnini

Armando Foschi

- Ortensio Zecchino

== Italian Communist Party ==
- Ugo Pecchioli
- Lucio Libertini
- Antonio Silvano Andriani
- Giglia Tedesco Tatò
- Roberto Maffioletti
- Renato Pollini
- Giuseppe Cannata
- Franco Giustinelli
- Roberto Maffioletti
- Graziella Tossi
- Ugo Sposetti
- Aureliana Alberici
- Luciano Barca
- Armando Cossutta
- Ferdinando Imposimato
- Luciano Lama
- Emanuele Macaluso
- Francesco Macis
- Piero Pieralli
- Ersilia Salvato
- Umberto Scardaoni
- Concetto Scivoletto
- Giovanna Senesi
- Giorgio Tornati
- Graziella Tossi
- Giuseppe Boffa
- Rodolfo Pietro Bollini
- Paolo Bufalini
- Matilde Callari Galli
- Aroldo Cascia
- Salvatore Crocetta
- Menotti Galeotti
- Carmine Garofalo
- Ugo Sposetti
- Ugo Benassi
- Lovrano Bisso
- Aldo Giacché
- Andrea Margheri
- Elios Andreini
- Renzo Antoniazzi
- Giulio Carlo Argan
- Ennio Baiardi
- Nereo Battello
- Vito Bellafiore
- Giuseppe Vitale
- Giovanni Berlinguer
- Lionello Bertoldi
- Gianna Schelotto
- Arrigo Boldrini
- Alfio Brina
- Giuseppe Cannata
- Giovanni Pellegrino
- Emanuele Cardinale
- Archimede Casadei Lucchi
- Giuseppe Antonio Chiarante
- Gerardo Chiaromonte
- Vittorio Chiesura
- Giorgio Cisbani
- Vito Consoli
- Orazio Montinaro
- Giovanni Correnti
- Angelo Dionisi
- Isa Ferraguti
- Maurizio Ferrara
- Antonio Franchi
- Vittorio Dante Gambino
- Lorenzo Gianotti
- Francesco Greco
- Giuseppe Iannone
- Franco Longo
- Pasquale Lops
- Maurizio Lotti
- Riccardo Margheriti
- Luigi Meriggi
- Maurizio Mesoraca
- Carla Federica Nespolo
- Venanzio Nocchi
- Onofrio Petrara
- Mario Pinna
- Giovanni Ranalli
- Camilla Ravera (L)
- Rino Serri
- Stojan Spetic
- Antonio Taramelli
- Glauco Torlontano
- Girolamo Tripodi
- Claudio Vecchi
- Tullio Vecchietti
- Ugo Vetere
- Giuseppe Vignola
- Roberto Visconti
- Paolo Volponi
- Grazia Zuffa

== Italian Socialist Party ==
- Fabio Fabbri
- Silvano Signori
- Bruno Vella
- Luigi Franza
- Modestino Acone
- Siro Zanella
- Vittorio Marniga
- Arduino Agnelli
- Maurizio Calvi
- Pietro Ferrara
- Antonio Mario Innamorato
- Tommaso Mancia
- Vittorio Marniga
- Antonio Natali
- Luigi Pierri
- Giuseppe Visca
- Siro Zanella
- Paolo Fogu
- Luigi Franza
- Achille Cutrera
- Michele Achilli
- Gennaro Acquaviva
- Norberto Bobbio (L)
- Eugenio Bozzello Verole
- Giorgio Casoli
- Roberto Cassola
- Cornelio Masciadri
- Franco Castiglione
- Francesco Cimino
- Luigi Covatta
- Francesco De Martino (L)
- Francesco Forte
- Guido Gerosa
- Gino Giugni
- Francesco Guizzi
- Giuseppe Russo
- Maria Rosaria Manieri
- Elena Marinucci
- Delio Meoli
- Roberto Meraviglia
- Antonio Muratore
- Sandro Pertini (L)
- Sossio Pezzullo
- Pietro Pizzo
- Giorgio Pizzol
- Nicola Putignano
- Giovanni Ricevuto
- Mario Rigo
- Giorgio Ruffolo
- Renzo Santini
- Gino Scevarolli
- Giovanni Beniamino Valcavi
- Bruno Pellegrino
- Sisinio Zito

== Independent Left ==
- Massimo Riva
- Filippo Cavazzuti
- Pierluigi Onorato
- Gaetano Arfè
- Gianfranco Pasquino
- Antonio Alberti
- Peppino Fiori
- Vittorio Foa
- Antonio Giolitti
- Claudio Napoleoni
- Giorgio Nebbia
- Franca Ongaro
- Adriano Ossicini
- Guido Rossi
- Giorgio Strehler
- Boris Ulianich
- Edoardo Vesentini

== Italian Social Movement ==
- Cristoforo Filetti
- Romano Misserville
- Antonio Rastrelli
- Piergiorgio Gradari
- Francesco Pontone
- Roberto Visibelli
- Mario Biagioni
- Sergio Sanesi
- Michele Florino
- Francesco Franco
- Elio Colosimo
- Antonino La Russa
- Alfredo Mantica
- Marisa Moltisanti
- Giorgio Pisanò
- Cesare Pozzo
- Ferdinando Signorelli
- Giuseppe Specchia

== Communist Refoundation Party ==
- Lucio Libertini
- Stojan Spetic
- Giuseppe Vitale
- Armando Cossutta
- Salvatore Crocetta
- Angelo Dionisi
- Luigi Meriggi
- Ersilia Salvato
- Rino Serri
- Girolamo Tripodi
- Paolo Volponi

== Italian Republican Party ==
- Libero Gualtieri
- Giorgio Covi
- Giuseppe Dipaola
- Susanna Agnelli
- Rocco Coletta
- Giovanni Ferrara
- Giuseppe Perricone
- Giovanni Spadolini (L)
- Leo Valiani (L)
- Bruno Visentini

== Italian Democratic Socialist Party ==
- Antonio Cariglia
- Vincenza Bono Parrino
- Gianpaolo Bissi
- Maurizio Pagani
- Costantino Dell'Osso
- Luigi Franza
- Giuseppe Saragat (L)

== Federalista Europeo Ecologista ==
- Gianfranco Spadaccia
- Franco Corleone
- Marco Boato
- Gianfranco Mariotti
- Piero Craveri
- Lorenzo Strik Lievers
- Domenico Modugno
- Giuseppe Lelio Petronio
- Massimo Teodori

== Mixed group ==
- Roland Riz
- Cesare Dujany
- Carlo Sanna
- Giovanni Agnelli (L)
- Umberto Bossi
- Francesco Candioto
- Giuseppe Fassino
- Giovanni Leone (L)
- Giovanni Malagodi
- Pietro Fiocchi
- Cesare Merzagora (L)
- Guido Pollice
- Hans Rubner
- Piergiorgio Sirtori
