= List of members of the Senate of Italy, 1983–1987 =

This is a list of the 324 members of the 9th legislature of the Italian Senate. They were elected on the 1983 general election.

Senators for life are marked with a "(L)"

== Christian Democracy ==
- Antonio Bisaglia
- Nicola Mancino
- Vincenzo Carollo
- Gianfranco Aliverti
- Learco Saporito
- Ivo Butini
- Elio Fontana
- Onio Della Porta
- Maria Eletta Martini
- Arturo Pacini
- Pietro Scoppola
- Mario Toros
- Giovanni Venturi
- Rosa Russo Jervolino
- Osvaldo Di Lembo
- Pietro Mezzapesa
- Claudio Beorchia
- Severino Fallucchi
- Maria Paola Colombo Svevo
- Gian Carlo Ruffino
- Lucio Abis
- Achille Accili
- Alcide Angeloni
- Giuseppe Avellone
- Carlo Baldi
- Luciano Bausi
- Enzo Berlanda
- Angelo Bernassola
- Carlo Boggio
- Vincenzo Bombardieri
- Adriano Bompiani
- Francesco Paolo Bonifacio
- Salvatore Campus
- Guido Carli
- Gianuario Carta
- Angelo Castelli
- Stefano Cavaliere
- Anna Gabriella Ceccatelli
- Onorio Cengarle
- Giuseppe Cerami
- Giovanni Silvestro Coco
- Alessandra Codazzi
- Pietro Colella
- Vittorino Colombo
- Mario Condorelli
- Francesco Cossiga
- Angelo Lai
- Mario Costa
- Sergio Cuminetti
- Michele Curella
- Giulio D'Agostini
- Saverio Damagio
- Saverio D'Amelio
- Germano De Cinque
- Costante Degan
- Giorgio De Giuseppe
- Giorgio Degola
- Salverino De Vito
- Alfredo Diana
- Francesco D'Onofrio
- Franco Evangelisti
- Franca Falducci
- Amintore Fanfani (L)
- Nicola Ferrara
- Mario Ferrari-Aggradi
- Giuseppe Fimognari
- Armando Foschi
- Giuseppe Fracassi
- Corradino Di Stefano
- Ignazio Marcello Gallo
- Luigi Genovese
- Delio Giacometti
- Bruno Giust
- Luigi Granelli
- Niccolò Grassi Bertazzi
- Manlio Ianni
- Bruno Kessler
- Nicola Lapenta
- Carmelo Francesco Salerno
- Nicolò Lipari
- Domenico Raffaello Lombardi
- Giuseppe Mascaro
- Francesco Mazzola
- Leonardo Melandri
- Giovanni Battista Melotto
- Giuseppe Miroglio
- Carlo Donat-Cattin
- Antonino Murmura
- Gualtiero Nepi
- Emilio Neri
- Giulio Cesare Orlando
- Pietro Padula
- Gian Pietro Rossi
- Felice Calcaterra
- Antonino Pagani
- Carlo Pastorino
- Francesco Patriarca
- Angelo Pavan
- Giuseppe Petrilli
- Michele Pinto
- Giorgio Postal
- Giovanni Prandini
- Francesco Rebecchini
- Antonino Riggio
- Carlo Romei
- Ernesto Pucci
- Roberto Romei
- Emilio Rubbi
- Roberto Ruffilli
- Mariano Rumor
- Franco Salvi
- Aldo Sandulli
- Augusto Del Noce
- Carmelo Santalco
- Giuseppe Santonastaso
- Decio Scardaccione
- Nicola Signorello
- Giuseppe Oriana
- Giorgio Spitella
- Rodolfo Tambroni Armaroli
- Angelo Lotti
- Alfredo Trifogli
- Alfonso Tanga
- Eugenio Tarabini
- Paolo Emilio Taviani
- Angelo Tomelleri
- Giuliano Gusso
- Giuseppe Tonutti
- Riccardo Triglia
- Vincenzo Vernaschi
- Glicerio Vettori
- Dino Viola
- Claudio Vitalone
- Benigno Zaccagnini

== Italian Communist Party ==
- Gerardo Chiaromonte
- Ugo Pecchioli
- Piero Pieralli
- Roberto Maffioletti
- Arrigo Morandi
- Carla Federica Nespolo
- Sergio Pollastrelli
- Giuseppe Cannata
- Giovanni Berlinguer
- Paolo Bufalini
- Giovanni Calice
- Giuseppe Cannata
- Armando Cossutta
- Maurizio Ferrara
- Lucio Libertini
- Maurizio Lotti
- Andrea Margheri
- Edoardo Romano Perna
- Ilvano Rasimelli
- Raimondo Ricci
- Ersilia Salvato
- Dante Stefani
- Giglia Tatò Tedesco
- Dario Valori
- Giuseppe Vitale
- Antonio Silvano Andriani
- Renzo Antoniazzi
- Rodolfo Pietro Bollini
- Sandrino De Toffol
- Nicola Imbriaco
- Paolo Volponi
- Alfredo Alfani
- Enrico Giuseppe Graziani
- Francesco Onorato Alici
- Gastone Angelin
- Giulio Carlo Argan
- Ennio Baiardi
- Nereo Battello
- Vito Bellafiore
- Gianfilippo Benedetti
- Lovrano Bisso
- Arrigo Boldrini
- Renzo Bonazzi
- Antonio Calì
- Nedo Canetti
- Pietro Carmeno
- Aroldo Cascia
- Mario Cheri
- Mario Birardi
- Giuseppe Antonio Chiarante
- Napoleone Colajanni
- Giancarlo Comastri
- Vito Consoli
- Salvatore Crocetta
- Giorgio De Sabbata
- Riccardo Di Corato
- Guido Fanti
- Nevio Felicetti
- Sergio Flamigni
- Sergio Gigli
- Gabriella Gherbez
- Aldo Giacché
- Lorenzo Gianotti
- Antonio Gioino
- Raffaele Giura Longo
- Franco Giustinelli
- Vinci Grossi
- Giuseppe Paolo Guarascio
- Giuseppe Iannone
- Emanuele Macaluso
- Riccardo Margheriti
- Francesco Martorelli
- Andrea Mascagni
- Luigi Meriggi
- Silvio Miana
- Armelino Milani
- Giuseppe Montalbano
- Antonino Papalia
- Lionello Puppi
- Alessio Pasquini
- Onofrio Petrara
- Carlo Pollidoro
- Renato Pollini
- Giuliano Procacci
- Italo Nicoletto
- Giovanni Ranalli
- Camilla Ravera (L)
- Marina Rossanda
- Vittorio Sega
- Antonio Taramelli
- Umberto Terracini
- Giuseppe Botti
- Alessandro Lippi
- Giovanni Torri
- Giovanni Battista Urbani
- Pietro Valenza
- Claudio Vecchi
- Tullio Vecchietti
- Roberto Visconti

== Italian Socialist Party ==
- Fabio Fabbri
- Giuliano Vassalli
- Paolo Barsacchi
- Francesco Cimino
- Gino Scevarolli
- Franco Castiglione
- Eugenio Bozzello Verole
- Andrea Buffoni
- Michele Sellitti
- Libero Della Briotta
- Salvatore Frasca
- Giuseppe Orciari
- Ottavio Spano
- Bruno Vella
- Renato Garibaldi
- Amleto Monsellato
- Antonio Muratore
- Maurizio Noci
- Luigi Panigazzi
- Norberto Bobbio (L)
- Roberto Cassola
- Luigi Covatta
- Francesco Antonio De Cataldo
- Francesco De Martino
- Francesco Di Nicola
- Piero Fabiani
- Beniamino Antonino Finocchiaro
- Gino Giugni
- Francesco Greco
- Fabio Maravalle
- Elena Marinucci
- Cornelio Masciadri
- Delio Meoli
- Enrico Novellini
- Sandro Pertini (L)
- Enrico Quaranta
- Francesco Iannelli
- Gaetano Scamarcio
- Domenico Segreto
- Silvano Signori
- Roberto Spano
- Nicola Trotta
- Sisinio Zito

== Independent Left ==
- Adriano Ossicini
- Claudio Napoleoni
- Eliseo Milani
- Francesco Pintus
- Filippo Cavazzuti
- Mario Gozzini
- Massimo Riva
- Antonio Alberti
- Luigi Silvestro Anderlini
- Eduardo De Filippo (L)
- Enzo Enriques Agnoletti
- Peppino Fiori
- Raniero La Valle
- Nicola Loprieno
- Franca Ongaro
- Gianfranco Pasquino
- Luigi Pingitore
- Ferdinando Russo
- Boris Ulianich

== Italian Social Movement ==
- Araldo Crollalanza
- Michele Marchio
- Pietro Pistolese
- Cesare Biglia
- Michele Marchio
- Francesco Franco
- Tommaso Mitrotti
- Cesare Pozzo
- Ajmone Finestra
- Antonio Rastrelli
- Antonio Del Prete
- Gerardo De Prisco
- Cristoforo Filetti
- Gioacchino Giangregorio
- Piergiorgio Gradari
- Antonino La Russa
- Marisa Moltisanti
- Riccardo Monaco
- Pietro Pirolo
- Roberto Galdieri
- Nicola Costanzo
- Giorgio Pisanò
- Pino Romualdi
- Ferdinando Signorelli

== Italian Republican Party ==
- Libero Gualtieri
- Claudio Venanzetti
- Susanna Agnelli
- Quintino Antonio Cartia
- Giorgio Covi
- Giovanni Ferrara
- Giacomo Leopizzi
- Vincenzo Mondo
- Biagio Pinto
- Aride Rossi
- Giovanni Spadolini
- Leo Valiani (L)

== Italian Democratic Socialist Party ==
- Gianfranco Conti Persini
- Dante Schietroma
- Maurizio Pagani
- Dino Riva
- Salvatore Bellafiore
- Cesarino Dante Cioce
- Luigi Franza
- Francesco Parrino
- Giuseppe Saragat (L)
- Renzo Sclavi

== Italian Liberal Party ==
- Giovanni Malagodi
- Attilio Bastianini
- Pietro Fiocchi
- Giuseppe Fassino
- Vincenzo Palumbo
- Salvatore Valitutti

== Mixed group ==
- Carlo Bo (L)
- Sergio Fontanari
- Giovanni Leone (L)
- Giovanni Battista Loi
- Cesare Merzagora (L)
- Mario Signorino
