= 1987 Italian Senate election in Lombardy =

- June 14, 1987

All 48 Lombard seats to the Italian Senate
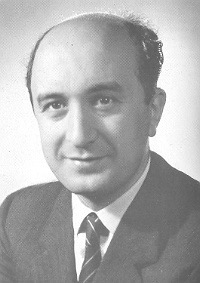

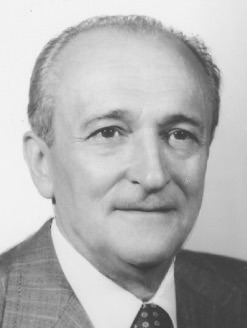
| | Majority party | Minority party | Third party |
|---|---|---|---|
| Leader | Ciriaco De Mita | Alessandro Natta | Bettino Craxi |
| Party | DC | PCI | PSI |
| Last election | 34.4%, 17 seats | 28.5%, 15 seats | 12.1%, 6 seats |
| Seats won | 18 | 12 | 8 |
| Seat change | ▲1 | ▼3 | ▲2 |
| Popular vote | 1,845,626 | 1,319,356 | 901,296 |
| Percentage | 34.4% | 24.6% | 16.8% |
| Swing | = | ▼3.9% | ▲4.7% |
Old local plurality before election
DC
New local plurality
DC

Lombardy elected its tenth delegation to the Italian Senate on June 14, 1987. This election was a part of national Italian general election of 1987 even if, according to the Italian Constitution, every senatorial challenge in each Region is a single and independent race.

The election was won by the centrist Christian Democracy, as it happened at national level. Seven Lombard provinces gave a majority or at least a plurality to the winning party, while the agricultural Province of Pavia and Province of Mantua preferred the Italian Communist Party.

== Background ==
Bettino Craxi's Italian Socialist Party reduced its gap with the Italian Communist Party after Enrico Berlinguer's death. Later after the USSR end the PCI lost his leftist wing, including senators Armando Cossutta and Luigi Meriggi, which created the Communist Refoundation Party. Many minor parties obtained a seat: between them, for the first time, Umberto Bossi's Lega Lombarda (Lega Nord since 1991).

== Electoral system ==
The electoral system for the Senate was a strange hybrid which established a form of proportional representation into FPTP-like constituencies. A candidate needed a landslide victory of more than 65% of votes to obtain a direct mandate. All constituencies where this result was not reached entered into an at-large calculation based upon the D'Hondt method to distribute the seats between the parties, and candidates with the best percentages of suffrages inside their party list were elected.

== Results ==
| Party | votes | votes (%) | seats | swing |
|---|---|---|---|---|
| Christian Democracy | 1,845,626 | 34.4 | 18 | ▲1 |
| Italian Communist Party | 1,319,356 | 24.6 | 12 | ▼3 |
| Italian Socialist Party | 901,296 | 16.8 | 8 | ▲2 |
| Italian Social Movement | 249,470 | 4.7 | 2 | = |
| Italian Republican Party | 217,157 | 4.1 | 2 | ▼1 |
| Federation of Green Lists | 139,573 | 2.6 | 1 | ▲1 |
| Lega Lombarda | 137,276 | 2.6 | 1 | ▲1 |
| Radical Party | 133,181 | 2.5 | 1 | = |
| Italian Democratic Socialist Party | 127,828 | 2.4 | 1 | ▼1 |
| Italian Liberal Party | 124,418 | 2.3 | 1 | ▼1 |
| Proletarian Democracy | 108,990 | 2.0 | 1 | ▲1 |
| Others | 56,617 | 1.1 | - | = |
| Total parties | 5,360,788 | 100.0 | 48 | = |

Sources: Italian Ministry of the Interior

=== Constituencies ===
| N° | Constituency | Elected | Party | Votes % | Others |
|---|---|---|---|---|---|
| 1 | Bergamo | Severino Citaristi | Christian Democracy | 46.1% | |
| 2 | Clusone | Enzo Berlanda | Christian Democracy | 52.0% | |
| 3 | Treviglio | Gilberto Bonalumi | Christian Democracy | 46.4% | |
| 4 | Brescia | Guido Carli | Christian Democracy | 38.9% | |
| 5 | Breno | Franco Salvi; Vittorio Marniga | Christian Democracy; Italian Socialist Party | 45.0% 20.3% | |
| 6 | Chiari | Giovanni Prandini | Christian Democracy | 47.7% | |
| 7 | Salò | Elio Fontana | Christian Democracy | 41.2% | |
| 8 | Como | Gianfranco Aliverti | Christian Democracy | 34.7% | |
| 9 | Lecco | Cesare Golfari | Christian Democracy | 40.9% | Pietro Fiocchi (PLI) 5.9% |
| 10 | Cantù | Giuseppe Guzzetti | Christian Democracy | 41.0% | |
| 11 | Cremona | Ernesto Vercesi; Renzo Antoniazzi | Christian Democracy; Italian Communist Party | 34.6% 32.7% | |
| 12 | Crema | Francesco Rebecchini | Christian Democracy | 41.7% | |
| 13 | Mantua | Cirillo Bonora; Giuseppe Chiarante | Christian Democracy; Italian Communist Party | 33.1% 32.0% | |
| 14 | Ostiglia | Maurizio Lotti; Gino Scevarolli | Italian Communist Party; Italian Socialist Party | 40.3% 17.8% | |
| 15 | Milan 1 | Giovanni Spadolini; Giovanni Malagodi | Italian Republican Party; Italian Liberal Party | 12.5% 8.3% | |
| 16 | Milan 2 | Giorgio Pisanò | Italian Social Movement | 8.2% | |
| 17 | Milan 3 | Giorgio Covi; Franco Corleone; Pier Giorgio Sirtori; Guido Pollice | Italian Republican Party; Radical Party; Federation of Green Lists; Proletarian Democracy | 8.9% 4.1% 4.0% 3.1% | Bruno Pellegrino (PSI) 17.4% |
| 18 | Milan 4 | Alfredo Mantica | Italian Social Movement | 7.5% | |
| 19 | Milan 5 | Guido Rossi; Michele Achilli; Unconstitutional result | Italian Communist Party (Gsi); Italian Socialist Party | 26.2% 19.3% 3.5% | seat ceded to Pollice |
| 20 | Milan 6 | Giorgio Strehler; Giorgio Ruffolo | Italian Communist Party (Gsi); Italian Socialist Party | 28.3% 20.0% | |
| 21 | Abbiategrasso | Massimo Riva; Achille Cutrera | Italian Communist Party (Gsi); Italian Socialist Party | 29.4% 18.3% | |
| 22 | Rho | Rodolfo Bollini; Antonio Natali | Italian Communist Party; Italian Socialist Party | 31.2% 18.3% | |
| 23 | Monza | None elected | | | Walter Fontana (DC) 32.8% Andrea Margheri (PCI) 25.1% |
| 24 | Vimercate | Luigi Granelli; Giovanna Senesi; Guido Gerosa | Christian Democracy; Italian Communist Party; Italian Socialist Party | 34.6% 26.8% 17.8% | |
| 25 | Lodi | Alfredo Diana; Antonio Taramelli | Christian Democracy; Italian Communist Party | 34.0% 33.0% | |
| 26 | Pavia | Antonio Giolitti | Italian Communist Party (Gsi) | 31.4% | Mario Viganò (DC) 30.8% |
| 27 | Voghera | Giovanni Azzaretti; Luigi Meriggi | Christian Democracy; Italian Communist Party | 34.0% 28.2% | |
| 28 | Vigevano | Armando Cossutta | Italian Communist Party | 37.2% | |
| 29 | Sondrio | Vittorino Colombo; Francesco Forte; Giampaolo Bissi | Christian Democracy; Italian Socialist Party; Italian Democratic Socialist Party | 42.7% 19.8% 6.8% | |
| 30 | Varese | Umberto Bossi | Lombard League | 7.0% | Maria Paola Colombo (DC) 31.0% Giovanni Valcavi (PSI) 17.9% |
| 31 | Busto Arsizio | Augusto Rezzonico | Christian Democracy | 34.6% | |

- No senator obtained a direct mandate. The electoral system was, in the other cases, a form of proportional representation and not a FPTP race: so candidates winning with a simple plurality could have (and usually had) a candidate (usually a Christian democrat) with more votes in their constituency.

=== Substitutions ===
- Walter Fontana for Monza (32.8%) replaced Francesco Rebecchini in 1988. Reason: death.
- Andrea Margheri for Monza (25.1%) replaced Antonio Taramelli in 1989. Reason: death.
- Maria Paola Colombo for Varese (31.0%) replaced Ernesto Vercesi in 1991. Reason: death.
- Giovanni Valcavi for Varese (17.9%) replaced Antonio Natali in 1991. Reason: death.
- Bruno Pellegrino for Milan 3 (17.4%) replaced Giovanni Valcavi in 1991. Reason: resignation.
- Pietro Fiocchi for Lecco 3 (5.9%) replaced Giovanni Malagodi in 1991. Reason: death.
- Mario Viganò for Pavia (30.8%) replaced Enzo Berlanda in 1992. Reason: resignation.
