= 1983 Italian Senate election in Lombardy =

- June 26, 1983

All 48 Lombard seats to the Italian Senate
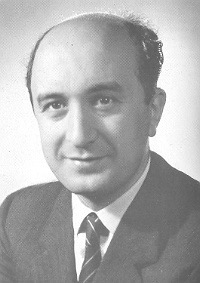

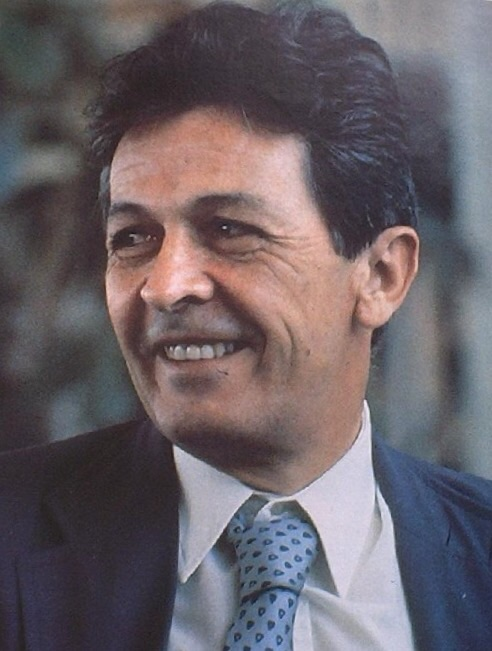
	Majority party	Minority party	Third party
Leader	Ciriaco De Mita	Enrico Berlinguer	Bettino Craxi
Party	DC	PCI	PSI
Last election	40.7%, 21 seats	29.4%, 15 seats	11.9%, 6 seats
Seats won	17	15	6
Seat change	▼4	=	=
Popular vote	1,747,002	1,447,823	615,644
Percentage	34.4%	28.5%	12.1%
Swing	▼6.3%	▼0.9%	▲0.2%
Old local plurality before election
DC
New local plurality
DC

Lombardy elected its ninth delegation to the Italian Senate on June 26, 1983. This election was a part of national Italian general election of 1983 even if, according to the Italian Constitution, every senatorial challenge in each Region is a single and independent race.

The election was won by the centrist Christian Democracy, as it happened at national level. Six Lombard provinces gave a majority or at least a plurality to the winning party, while the agricultural Province of Pavia and Province of Mantua, and this time the industrial Province of Milan, preferred the Italian Communist Party.

== Background ==
As the red rising seemed to be stopped in Italy, many center-right electors began to think no more necessary a vote for Christian Democracy which lost many seats to minor parties, especially to the Italian Republican Party of former Prime Minister Giovanni Spadolini.

== Electoral system ==
The electoral system for the Senate was a strange hybrid which established a form of proportional representation into FPTP-like constituencies. A candidate needed a landslide victory of more than 65% of votes to obtain a direct mandate. All constituencies where this result was not reached entered into an at-large calculation based upon the D'Hondt method to distribute the seats between the parties, and candidates with the best percentages of suffrages inside their party list were elected.

== Results ==
Party	votes	votes (%)	seats	swing
Christian Democracy	1,747,002	34.4	17	▼4
Italian Communist Party	1,447,823	28.5	15	=
Italian Socialist Party	615,644	12.1	6	=
Italian Republican Party	349,351	6.9	3	▲2
Italian Social Movement	255,667	5.0	2	▲1
Italian Liberal Party	197,084	3.9	2	▲1
Italian Democratic Socialist Party	192,172	3.8	2	=
Radical Party	103,697	2.0	1	=
Others	168,885	3.3	-	=
Total parties	5,076,325	100.0	48	=

Sources: Italian Ministry of the Interior

=== Constituencies ===
N°	Constituency	Elected	Party	Votes %	Others
1	Bergamo	Angelo Castelli	Christian Democracy	49.6%	
2	Clusone	Enzo Berlanda	Christian Democracy	55.8%	
3	Treviglio	Vincenzo Bombardieri	Christian Democracy	49.6%	
4	Brescia	Pietro Padula; Gino Torri	Christian Democracy; Italian Communist Party	37.5% 28.5%	
5	Breno	Franco Salvi	Christian Democracy	48.4%	
6	Chiari	Giovanni Prandini	Christian Democracy	49.3%	
7	Salò	Elio Fontana	Christian Democracy	42.2%	Italo Nicoletto (PCI) 26.2%
8	Como	Gianfranco Aliverti; Gianfranco Conti Persini	Christian Democracy; Italian Democratic Socialist Party	35.7% 7.5%	
9	Lecco	Maria Paola Colombo; Pietro Fiocchi	Christian Democracy; Italian Liberal Party	41.4% 9.0%	
10	Cantù	Vittorino Colombo	Christian Democracy	41.6%	
11	Cremona	Renzo Antoniazzi; Vincenzo Vernaschi	Italian Communist Party; Christian Democracy	35.9% 34.7%	
12	Crema	Francesco Rebecchini; Unconstitutional result	Christian Democracy	42.6% 28.1%	Maurizio Noci (PSI) 13.6% seat ceded to Pintus
13	Mantua	Giuseppe Chiarante; Gino Scevarolli	Italian Communist Party; Italian Socialist Party	34.6% 14.6%	
14	Ostiglia	Maurizio Lotti; Enrico Novellini	Italian Communist Party; Italian Socialist Party	42.5% 16.7%	
15	Milan 1	Guido Carli^ Giovanni Spadolini; Giovanni Malagodi	Christian Democracy; Italian Republican Party; Italian Liberal Party	28.2% 20.6% 9.9%	
16	Milan 2	Giorgio Pisanò; Spadolini's third election	Italian Social Movement	9.2% 18%	seat ceded to Ferrara
17	Milan 3	Giorgio Covi; Cesare Biglia; Mario Signorino	Italian Republican Party; Italian Social Movement; Radical Party	14.2% 8.5% 3.2%	
18	Milan 4	Roberto Romei^ Spadolini's second election	Christian Democracy	23.5% 19%	seat ceded to Covi
19	Milan 5	Giuliano Procacci; Giovanni Ferrara	Italian Communist Party; Italian Republican Party	30.6% 11.1%	
20	Milan 6	Eliseo Milani	Italian Communist Party	32.3%	
21	Abbiategrasso	Massimo Riva	Italian Communist Party (Gsi)	34.3%	
22	Rho	Rodolfo Bollini	Italian Communist Party	36.2%	
23	Monza	Libero Riccardelli	Italian Communist Party	30.9%	Felice Calcaterra (DC) 32.9%
24	Vimercate	Luigi Granelli; Marina Rossanda	Christian Democracy; Italian Communist Party	35.6% 31.0%	
25	Lodi	Antonio Taramelli; Alfredo Diana	Italian Communist Party; Christian Democracy	37.3% 34.4%	
26	Pavia	Armelino Milani; Renato Garibaldi	Italian Communist Party (Gsi); Italian Socialist Party	35.6% 14.3%	
27	Voghera	Luigi Meriggi; Luigi Panigazzi; Renzo Sclavi	Italian Communist Party; Italian Socialist Party; Italian Democratic Socialist Party	31.7% 15.2% 6.0%	
28	Vigevano	Armando Cossutta	Italian Communist Party	41.6%	
29	Sondrio	Eugenio Tarabini; Libero Della Briotta	Christian Democracy; Italian Socialist Party	48.6% 17.4%	
30	Varese	Francesco Pintus	Italian Communist Party (Gsi)	27.2%	
31	Busto Arsizio	Andrea Buffoni	Italian Socialist Party	13.8%	Gian Pietro Rossi (DC) 34.1%

- No senator obtained a direct mandate. The electoral system was, in the other cases, a form of proportional representation and not a FPTP race: so candidates winning with a simple plurality could have (and usually had) a candidate (usually a Christian democrat) with more votes in their constituency.
- ^ Linked to Spadolini's triple election.

=== Substitutions ===
- Maurizio Noci for Crema (13.6%) replaced Libero Della Briotta in 1985. Reason: death.
- Gian Pietro Rossi for Busto Arsizio (34.1%) replaced Pietro Padula in 1986. Reason: resignation.
- Felice Calcaterra for Monza (32.9%) replaced Gian Pietro Rossi in 1986. Reason: resignation.
- Italo Nicoletto for Salò (26.2%) replaced Giuliano Procacci in 1986. Reason: resignation.
