= Legislature XI of Italy =

11th legislature of the Italian Republic (1992–1994)

Legislature XI of Italy XI legislatura della Repubblica Italiana
- 11th legislature

Type
- Type: bicameral
- Houses: Chamber of Deputies; Senate of the Republic

History
- Founded: 23 April 1992
- Disbanded: 14 April 1994 (1 year, 356 days)
- Preceded by: X Legislature
- Succeeded by: XII Legislature

Leadership
- President of the Senate: Giovanni Spadolini, PRI
- President of the Chamber of Deputies: Oscar Luigi Scalfaro, DC (24 April 1992 – 25 May 1992); Giorgio Napolitano, PDS (3 June 1992 – 14 April 1994)

Structure
- Seats: 630 (C); 315+ (S)
- Chamber of Deputies political groups: DC–PPI (179); PDS (106); PSI (91); LN (50); MSI (34); PRC (33); PRI (26); CCD (24); PLI (17); FdV (16); PSDI (15); Rete (12); FE (6); Mixed (21)
- Senate political groups: DC–PPI (112); PDS (65); PSI (50); LN (25); PRC (20); MSI (16); PRI (12); FdV–Rete (6); PLI (5); Mixed (15)

Elections
- Chamber of Deputies voting system: Proportional
- Senate voting system: Proportional
- Last general election: 5–6 April 1992

Meeting place
- Palazzo Montecitorio, Rome (C)
- Palazzo Madama, Rome (S)

Website
- storia.camera.it/legislature/leg-repubblica-XI www.senato.it/leg11/home

Constitution
- Constitution of Italy

The Legislature XI of Italy (Italian: XI Legislatura della Repubblica Italiana) was the 11th legislature of the Italian Republic, and lasted from 23 April 1992 until 14 April 1994. Its composition was the one resulting from the general election of 5 and 6 April 1992. The election was called by President Cossiga on 3 February 1992.

This legislature was one of the shortest in the history of the Italian Republic and is considered the last one of the so-called "First Republic" (Italian: Prima Repubblica). Characterized by a huge political fragmentation, the legislature prematurely came to an end after many of the historical parties represented in Parliament were overwhelmed by Tangentopoli scandal and subsequently disbanded.

== Government ==
Prime Minister	Party	Term of office		Government	Composition
Prime Minister	Party	Took office	Left office	Government	Composition
Giuliano Amato (b. 1938)	Italian Socialist Party	28 June 1992	28 April 1993	Amato I	DC • PSI • PSDI • PLI (Quadripartito)
Carlo Azeglio Ciampi (1920–2016)	Independent	28 April 1993	10 May 1994	Ciampi	DC • PSI • PDS • PLI • PSDI • PRI • FdV

== Composition ==
=== Chamber of Deputies ===
- President: Oscar Luigi Scalfaro (DC), elected on 24 April 1992, dismissed on 25 May 1992 (elected President of the Republic), Giorgio Napolitano (PDS), elected on 1 June 1992
- Vice Presidents: Silvano Labriola (PSI), Alfredo Biondi (PLI), Stefano Rodotà (PDS, until 4 June 1992), Mario D'Acquisto (DC, until 17 June 1993), Tarcisio Gitti (DC, from 25 June 1992), Clemente Mastella (DC, from 1 July 1993)

Parliamentary groups in the Chamber of Deputies
Initial composition		Final composition		
Parliamentary group	Seats	Parliamentary group	Seats	Change
Christian Democratic	206	Christian Democratic – Italian People's Party	179	▼27
Communist – PDS	107	Democratic Party of the Left	106	▼1
Italian Socialist Party	92	Italian Socialist Party	91	▼1
Lega Nord	55	Lega Nord	50	▼5
Communist Refoundation	35	Communist Refoundation	33	▼2
Italian Social Movement – National Right	34	Italian Social Movement – National Right	34	Steady
Republican	27	Republican	26	▼1
Italian Liberal Party	17	Italian Liberal Party	17	Steady
Greens	16	Greens	16	Steady
Italian Democratic Socialist Party	16	Italian Democratic Socialist Party	15	▼1
Movement for Democracy: The Network	12	Movement for Democracy: The Network	12	Steady
European Federalist	6	European Federalist	6	Steady
		Christian Democratic Centre	24	▲24
Mixed	7	Mixed	21	▲14
Total seats	630	Total seats	630	Steady

=== Senate ===
- President: Giovanni Spadolini (PRI), elected on 24 April 1992
- Vice Presidents: Luciano Lama (PDS), Gino Scevarolli (PSI), Giorgio De Giuseppe (DC), Luigi Granelli (DC)

Parliamentary groups in the Senate of the Republic
Initial composition		Final composition		
Parliamentary group	Seats	Parliamentary group	Seats	Change
Christian Democratic	112	Italian People's Party – Christian Democracy	112	Steady
Democratic Party of the Left	66	Democratic Party of the Left	65	▼1
Italian Socialist Party	51	Italian Socialist Party	50	▼1
Lega Nord	25	Lega Nord	25	Steady
Communist Refoundation	20	Communist Refoundation	20	Steady
Italian Social Movement – National Right	16	Italian Social Movement – National Right	16	Steady
Republican	12	Republican	12	Steady
		Greens – The Network	6	▲6
		Liberal	5	▲5
Mixed	23	Mixed	15	▼8
South Tyrolean People's Party	3	South Tyrolean People's Party	3	Steady
Italian Democratic Socialist Party	3	Italian Democratic Socialist Party	3	Steady
Regions League	1	Regions League	1	Steady
Aosta Valley	1	Aosta Valley	1	Steady
The Network	3	The Network	1	▼2
Liberal	5			▼5
Greens	4			▼4
Non inscrits	3	Non inscrits	6	▲3
Total seats	325	Total seats	326	▲1

==== Senators for Life ====
Senator	Motivation	Appointed by	From	Till
Amintore Fanfani	Merits in the social field	President Giovanni Leone	Previous legislature	Next legislature
Giovanni Leone	Former president of Italy	ex officio	Previous legislature	Next legislature
Leo Valiani	Merits in the social field	President Sandro Pertini	Previous legislature	Next legislature
Carlo Bo	Merits in the literary field	President Sandro Pertini	Previous legislature	Next legislature
Norberto Bobbio	Merits in the social and scientific field	President Sandro Pertini	Previous legislature	Next legislature
Giovanni Spadolini	Merits in the social field	President Francesco Cossiga	Previous legislature	Next legislature
Gianni Agnelli	Merits in the social field	President Francesco Cossiga	Previous legislature	Next legislature
Giulio Andreotti	Merits in the social field	President Francesco Cossiga	Previous legislature	Next legislature
Francesco De Martino	Merits in the social field	President Francesco Cossiga	Previous legislature	Next legislature
Paolo Emilio Taviani	Merits in the social field	President Francesco Cossiga	Previous legislature	Next legislature
Francesco Cossiga	Former president of Italy	ex officio	28 April 1992	Next legislature
