= Antonio Natali =

Antonio Natali may refer to:

- Antonio Natali (art historian)
- Antonio Natali (politician)
