= Pietro Fabris =

Pietro Fabris may refer to:

- Pietro Fabris (painter)
- Pietro Fabris (politician)
