= Fimognari =

Fimognari is an Italian surname. Notable people with the surname include:

- Giuseppe Fimognari (1932–2024), Italian physician and politician
- Michael Fimognari (born 1974), American cinematographer and director
