= De Mita government =

46th government of the Italian Republic

De Mita Cabinet
- 46th Cabinet of Italy

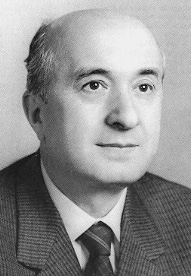
- Date formed: 13 April 1988
- Date dissolved: 22 July 1989

People and organisations
- Head of state: Francesco Cossiga
- Head of government: Ciriaco De Mita
- Total no. of members: 32
- Member parties: DC, PSI, PSDI, PRI, PLI
- Status in legislature: Coalition government Pentapartito
- Opposition parties: PCI, MSI, PR, Greens, DP

History
- Legislature term: X Legislature (1987 – 1992)
- Predecessor: Goria Cabinet
- Successor: Andreotti VI Cabinet

The De Mita government was the 46th cabinet of the Italian Republic. It held office from 1988 to 1989.

After being appointed as new president of the Christian Democracy, De Mita was forced to resign due to several hassles between his party and the PSI. After that, President Francesco Cossiga gave the presidential mandate to form a new cabinet to Giovanni Spadolini and then again to De Mita, until the formation of a new government led by Giulio Andreotti, on 23 July 1989.

== Party breakdown ==
- Christian Democracy (DC): Prime Minister, 15 ministers, 35 undersecretaries
- Italian Socialist Party (PSI): Deputy Prime minister, 9 ministers, 19 undersecretaries
- Italian Republican Party (PRI): 3 ministers, 5 undersecretaries
- Italian Democratic Socialist Party (PSDI): 2 ministers, 3 undersecretaries
- Italian Liberal Party (PLI): 1 minister, 4 undersecretaries

== Composition ==
Portfolio	Minister	Took office	Left office	Party
Prime Minister	Ciriaco De Mita	13 April 1988	22 July 1989	DC
Deputy Prime Minister	Gianni De Michelis	13 April 1988	22 July 1989	PSI
Minister of Foreign Affairs	Giulio Andreotti	13 April 1988	22 July 1989	DC
Minister of the Interior	Antonio Gava	13 April 1988	22 July 1989	DC
Minister of Grace and Justice	Giuliano Vassalli	13 April 1988	22 July 1989	PSI
Minister of Budget and Economic Planning	Amintore Fanfani	13 April 1988	22 July 1989	DC
Minister of Finance	Emilio Colombo	13 April 1988	22 July 1989	DC
Minister of Treasury	Giuliano Amato	13 April 1988	22 July 1989	PSI
Minister of Defence	Valerio Zanone	13 April 1988	22 July 1989	PLI
Minister of Public Education	Giovanni Galloni	13 April 1988	22 July 1989	DC
Minister of Public Works	Enrico Ferri	13 April 1988	22 July 1989	PSDI
Minister of Agriculture and Forests	Calogero Mannino	13 April 1988	22 July 1989	DC
Minister of Transport	Giorgio Santuz	13 April 1988	22 July 1989	DC
Minister of Post and Telecommunications	Oscar Mammì	13 April 1988	22 July 1989	PRI
Minister of Industry, Commerce and Craftsmanship	Adolfo Battaglia	13 April 1988	22 July 1989	PRI
Minister of Health	Carlo Donat-Cattin	13 April 1988	22 July 1989	DC
Minister of Foreign Trade	Renato Ruggiero	13 April 1988	22 July 1989	PSI
Minister of Merchant Navy	Giovanni Prandini	13 April 1988	22 July 1989	DC
Minister of State Holdings	Carlo Fracanzani	13 April 1988	22 July 1989	DC
Minister of Labour and Social Security	Rino Formica	13 April 1988	22 July 1989	PSI
Minister of Cultural and Environmental Heritage	Vincenza Bono Parrino	13 April 1988	22 July 1989	PSDI
Minister of Tourism and Entertainment	Franco Carraro	13 April 1988	22 July 1989	PSI
Minister of the Environment	Giorgio Ruffolo	13 April 1988	22 July 1989	PSI
Minister of University and Scientific Research	Antonio Ruberti (ad interim)	26 May 1989	22 July 1989	PSI
Minister of Regional Affairs (without portfolio)	Antonio Maccanico	13 April 1988	22 July 1989	PRI
Minister for Social Affairs (without portfolio)	Rosa Russo Iervolino	13 April 1988	22 July 1989	DC
Minister for the Coordination of Community Policies (without portfolio)	Antonio La Pergola	13 April 1988	22 July 1989	PSI
Minister for the Coordination of Civil Protection (without portfolio)	Vito Lattanzio	13 April 1988	22 July 1989	DC
Minister of Public Function (without portfolio)	Paolo Cirino Pomicino	13 April 1988	22 July 1989	DC
Minister for Extraordinary Interventions in the South (without portfolio)	Remo Gaspari	13 April 1988	22 July 1989	DC
Minister for Urban Areas Problems (without portfolio)	Carlo Tognoli	13 April 1988	22 July 1989	PSI
Minister for Scientific Research (without portfolio)	Antonio Ruberti	13 April 1988	25 May 1989	PSI
Minister for Parliamentary Relations (without portfolio)	Sergio Mattarella	13 April 1988	22 July 1989	DC
Secretary of the Council of Ministers	Riccardo Misasi	13 April 1988	22 July 1989	DC
