= Alessandra Codazzi =

Italian politician (1921–2010)

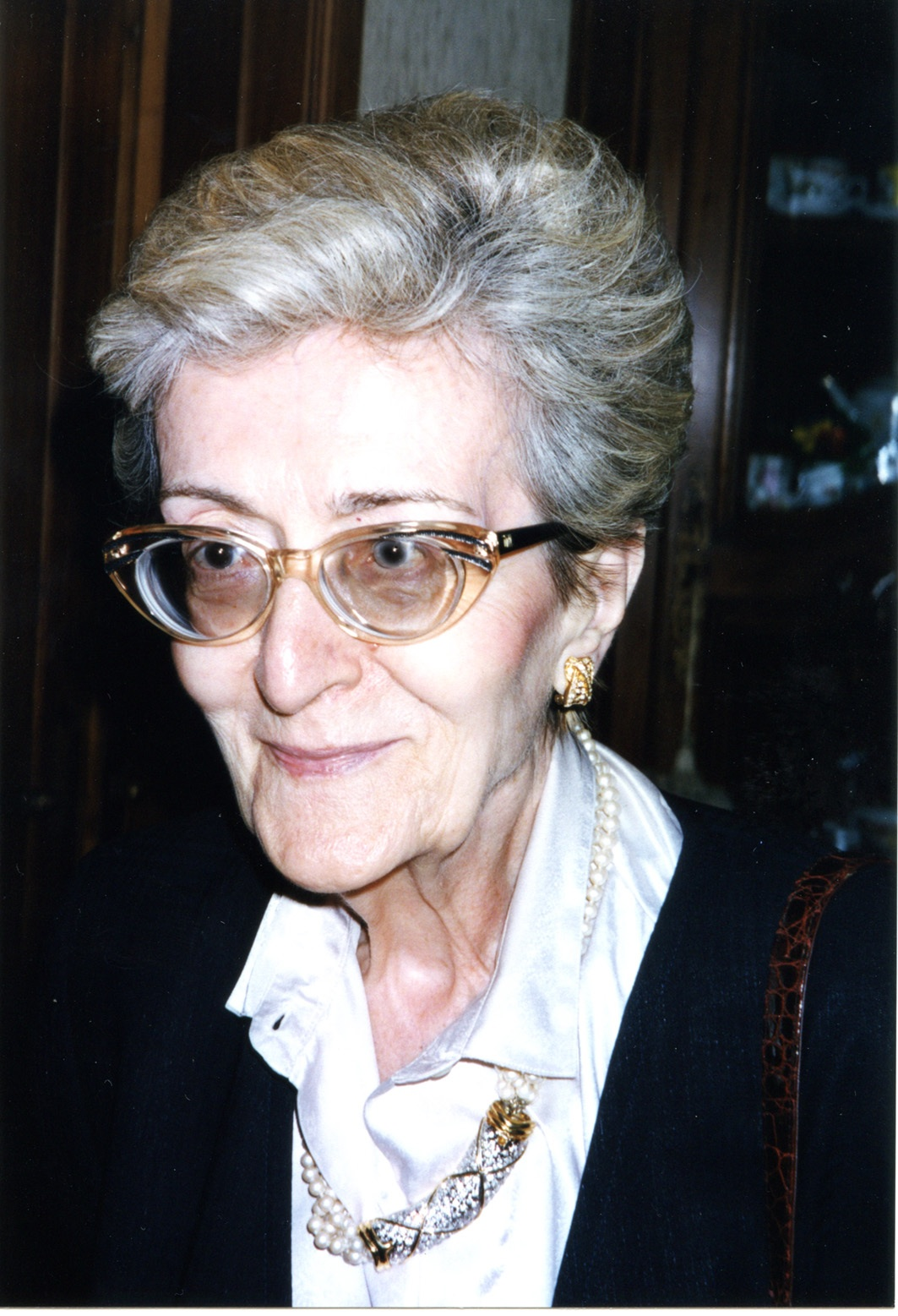

Senator of the Italian Republic
- In office 5 July 1976 – 1 July 1987
- Constituency: Veneto

Personal details
- Born: 11 November 1921 Reggio Emilia, Kingdom of Italy
- Died: 5 May 2010 (aged 88) Rome, Italy
- Party: Christian Democracy
- Education: Università Cattolica del Sacro Cuore
- Profession: Trade unionist

Alessandra "Sandra" Codazzi (11 November 1921 – 5 May 2010) was an Italian politician, trade unionist, and partisan.

== Biography ==
Codazzi was born on 11 November 1921 in Reggio Emilia. Firstborn of seven brothers and daughter of Colonel Alberto Codazzi, who was a descendant of Agostino Codazzi, geographer and national hero in Venezuela and Colombia.

During the Second World War she was partisan, making the messenger for the partisan brigade of Catholic inspiration Brigate Fiamme Verdi hidden in the Reggio Apennines, taking the name of "Rosario" to avoid being captured by the Nazi-Fascists. Graduated in literature and philosophy at the Università Cattolica del Sacro Cuore, a pupil of Giuseppe Dossetti, she first entered the Azione Cattolica and shortly afterwards in the CISL of Giulio Pastore, where she attended the "Long Course" at the CISL Study Center in Florence with Professor Mario Romani. In the CISL she took care of women and workers' rights until she became national secretary of CISL textiles. In 1976 she was elected Senator for the Christian Democrats, she held this position until 1987.

She worked and had close relations with her colleagues Anna Gabriella Ceccatelli, Tina Anselmi and Nilde Iotti.

She died in Rome on 5 May 2010.

== Bibliography ==
- Pallai, Agata (1975). Così... lungo l'eroica via. Parma: Tipolitografia Benedettina. p. 70.
- Paterlini, Avvenire (1977). Partigiane e patriote della provincia di Reggio nell'Emilia. Reggio Emilia: Edizioni Libreria Rinascita. p. 170.
- Franca Pieroni Bortolotti (1978). Le donne della Resistenza antifascista e la questione femminile in Emilia Romagna: 1943-1945. Milano: Vangelista. p. 43.
- Dianella Gagliani, ed. (2006). "I gruppi di difesa della donna a Reggio Emilia fra Garibaldini e Fiamme Verdi". Guerra, resistenza, politica. Reggio Emilia: Aliberti. pp. 166–181.
- Salvini, Elisabetta (2013). Ada e le altre. Milano: FrancoAngeli. ISBN 9788820454616.
