= Legislature X of Italy =

10th legislature of the Italian Republic (1987–1992)

Legislature X of Italy X legislatura della Repubblica Italiana
- 10th legislature

Type
- Type: bicameral
- Houses: Chamber of Deputies; Senate of the Republic

History
- Founded: 2 July 1987
- Disbanded: 22 April 1992 (4 years, 295 days)
- Preceded by: IX Legislature
- Succeeded by: XI Legislature

Leadership
- President of the Senate: Giovanni Spadolini, PRI since 2 July 1987
- President of the Chamber of Deputies: Nilde Iotti, PCI since 2 July 1987

Structure
- Seats: 630 (C); 315 (S)
- Chamber of Deputies political groups: DC (234); PCI–PDS (149); PSI (100); MSI (33); PRI (20); SI (19); V (16); PSDI (12); PLI (11); DP (11); FE (8); Mixed (16)
- Senate political groups: DC (129); PCI (74); PSI (45); SI (15); MSI (15); PRC (11); PRI (9); FE (6); PSDI (5); Mixed (14)

Elections
- Chamber of Deputies voting system: Proportional
- Senate voting system: Proportional
- Last general election: 14 June 1987

Meeting place
- Palazzo Montecitorio, Rome (C)
- Palazzo Madama, Rome (S)

Website
- storia.camera.it/legislature/leg-repubblica-X www.senato.it/leg10/home

Constitution
- Constitution of Italy

The Legislature X of Italy (Italian: X Legislatura della Repubblica Italiana) was the 10th legislature of the Italian Republic, and lasted from 2 July 1987 until 22 April 1992. Its composition was the one resulting from the general election of 14 and 15 June 1987. The election was called by President Cossiga on 28 April 1987, when he dissolved the Houses of Parliament.

== History ==
Following the general election, Christian democrat Giovanni Goria, a protégé of DC party leader Ciriaco De Mita, became prime minister at the head of a renewed Pentapartito coalition. At that time Goria was the youngest Prime Minister of Italy since the birth of the republic. Despite the initial credit towards Goria's reformist agenda, he was soon forced to resign in April 1988 after the Parliament refused to pass the government budget. Subsequently, De Mita himself was appointed prime minister: his short time in office just witnessed the passage of a law in May 1988 that introduced a new benefit for salaried workers called "benefit for the family nucleus", with the amount varying depending on the number of family members and the family income of the previous year.

However, in Spring 1989 the so-called "pact of the camper" stipulated between the socialist leader Bettino Craxi and the Christian democratic leaders Arnaldo Forlani and Giulio Andreotti – secretly shared in a parking out of Ex Ansaldo factory in Milan, where the Congress of the Italian Socialist Party were taking place – provided a new path that would have started with the fall of the De Mita's government and the formation of a cabinet with a social democrat-led transition, culminating in another Craxi's government, while Andreotti or Forlani would have been elected President of Italy in the 1992 presidential election. As agreed, shortly after De Mita's government fell and on 22 July 1989 Andreotti was sworn in for the third time as prime minister. His government was characterized by a turbulent course: Andreotti decided to stay at the head of government, despite the abandonment of many social democratic ministers, after the approval of the norm on TV spots (favorable to private TV channels of Silvio Berlusconi).

In 1990 Andreotti revealed the existence of the Operation Gladio; Gladio was the codename for a clandestine North Atlantic Treaty Organization (NATO) "stay-behind" operation in Italy during the Cold War. Its purpose was to prepare for, and implement, armed resistance in the event of a Warsaw Pact invasion and conquest. Although Gladio specifically refers to the Italian branch of the NATO stay-behind organizations, "Operation Gladio" is used as an informal name for all of them.

During his premiership Andreotti clashed many times with President of the Republic Francesco Cossiga.

== Government ==
Prime Minister	Party	Term of office		Government	Composition
Prime Minister	Party	Took office	Left office	Government	Composition
Giovanni Goria (1943–1994)	Christian Democracy	28 July 1987	13 April 1988	Goria	DC • PSI • PSDI • PLI • PRI (Pentapartito)
Ciriaco De Mita (1928–2022)	Christian Democracy	13 April 1988	22 July 1989	De Mita	DC • PSI • PSDI • PLI • PRI (Pentapartito)
Giulio Andreotti (1919–2013)	Christian Democracy	22 July 1989	12 April 1991	Andreotti VI	DC • PSI • PSDI • PLI • PRI (Pentapartito)
Giulio Andreotti (1919–2013)	Christian Democracy	12 April 1991	28 June 1992	Andreotti VII	DC • PSI • PSDI • PLI (Quadripartito)

== Composition ==
=== Chamber of Deputies ===
- President: Nilde Iotti (PCI), elected on 2 July 1987
- Vice Presidents: Aldo Aniasi (PSI), Alfredo Biondi (PLI), Vito Lattanzio (DC, until 12 May 1988), Gerardo Bianco (DC, until 27 July 1990), Michele Zolla (DC, from 12 May 1988), Adolfo Sarti (DC, from 18 October 1990)

Parliamentary groups in the Chamber of Deputies
Initial composition		Final composition		
Parliamentary group	Seats	Parliamentary group	Seats	Change
Christian Democratic	234	Christian Democratic	234	Steady
Communist	157	Communist Group – PDS	149	▼8
Italian Socialist Party	94	Italian Socialist Party	100	▲6
MSI – National Right	34	MSI – National Right	33	▼1
Republican	21	Republican	20	▼1
Independent Left	20	Independent Left	19	▼1
Italian Democratic Socialist Party	17	Italian Democratic Socialist Party	12	▼5
Green	13	Green	16	▲3
European Federalist	12	European Federalist	8	▼4
Italian Liberal Party	11	Italian Liberal Party	11	Steady
Proletarian Democracy	8	DP – Communists	11	▲3
Mixed	8	Mixed	16	▲8
Total seats	629	Total seats	629	Steady

=== Senate ===
- President: Giovanni Spadolini (PRI), elected on 2 July 1987
- Vice Presidents: Luciano Lama (PDS), Paolo Emilio Taviani (DC), Giorgio De Giuseppe (DC), Gino Scevarolli (PSI)

Parliamentary groups in the Senate of the Republic
Initial composition		Final composition		
Parliamentary group	Seats	Parliamentary group	Seats	Change
Christian Democratic	127	Christian Democracy	129	▲2
Communist	85	Communist – PDS	74	▼11
Italian Socialist Party	45	Italian Socialist Party	45	Steady
Independent Left	17	Independent Left	15	▼2
Italian Social Movement – National Right	16	Italian Social Movement – National Right	15	▼1
Republican	9	Republican	9	Steady
Italian Democratic Socialist Party	7	Italian Democratic Socialist Party	5	▼2
European Federalist Ecologist	6	European Federalist Ecologist	6	Steady
		Communist Refoundation	11	▲11
Mixed	12	Mixed	14	▲2
Italian Liberal Party	3	Liberal	3	Steady
South Tyrolean People's Party	2	South Tyrolean People's Party	2	Steady
Progressive Democratic Autonomists	1	Progressive Democratic Autonomists	1	Steady
Sardinian Action Party	1	Sardinian Action Party	1	Steady
Lega Lombarda	1	Lega Lombarda – Lega Nord	1	Steady
Green List	1			▼1
Proletarian Democracy	1			▼1
		Federation of the Greens	1	▲1
		Housewives – Pensioners	1	▲1
Non inscrits	2	Non inscrits	4	▲2
Total seats	324	Total seats	323	▼1

==== Senators for Life ====
Senator	Motivation	Appointed by	From	Till
Cesare Merzagora	Merits in the social field	President Antonio Segni	Previous legislature	1 May 1991 (deceased)
Giuseppe Saragat	Former president of Italy	ex officio	Previous legislature	11 June 1988 (deceased)
Amintore Fanfani	Merits in the social field	President Giovanni Leone	Previous legislature	Next legislature
Giovanni Leone	Former president of Italy	ex officio	Previous legislature	Next legislature
Leo Valiani	Merits in the social field	President Sandro Pertini	Previous legislature	Next legislature
Camilla Ravera	Merits in the social field	President Sandro Pertini	Previous legislature	14 April 1988 (deceased)
Carlo Bo	Merits in the literary field	President Sandro Pertini	Previous legislature	Next legislature
Norberto Bobbio	Merits in the social and scientific field	President Sandro Pertini	Previous legislature	Next legislature
Sandro Pertini	Former president of Italy	ex officio	Previous legislature	24 February 1990 (deceased)
Giovanni Spadolini	Merits in the social field	President Francesco Cossiga	2 May 1991	Next legislature
Gianni Agnelli	Merits in the social field	President Francesco Cossiga	1 June 1991	Next legislature
Giulio Andreotti	Merits in the social field	President Francesco Cossiga	1 June 1991	Next legislature
Francesco De Martino	Merits in the social field	President Francesco Cossiga	1 June 1991	Next legislature
Paolo Emilio Taviani	Merits in the social field	President Francesco Cossiga	1 June 1991	Next legislature
