= Goria government =

45th government of the Italian Republic

Goria Cabinet
- 45th Cabinet of Italy

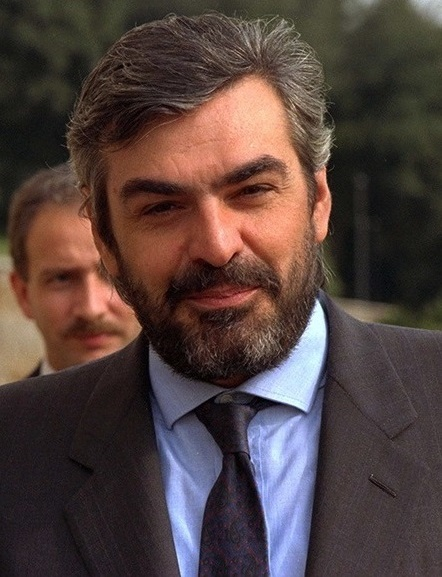
- Date formed: 29 July 1987
- Date dissolved: 13 April 1988

People and organisations
- Head of state: Francesco Cossiga
- Head of government: Giovanni Goria
- Total no. of members: 30 (incl. Prime Minister)
- Member party: DC, PSI, PRI, PSDI, PLI
- Status in legislature: Coalition government Pentapartito
- Opposition parties: PCI, MSI, PR, Greens, DP

History
- Election: 1987 election
- Legislature term: X Legislature (1987 – 1992)
- Predecessor: Fanfani VI Cabinet
- Successor: De Mita Cabinet

The Goria Cabinet was the 45th cabinet of the Italian Republic. It held office from 1987 to 1988.

After several months of uncertainty and discontent within the majority, Goria decided to resign on 11 March 1988 after the PSI had expressed strong opposition to the way the government had approved the reopening of the construction site of the Montalto di Castro nuclear power plant.

== Party breakdown ==
- Christian Democracy (DC): Prime minister, 14 ministers, 31 undersecretaries
- Italian Socialist Party (PSI): 9 ministers, 17 undersecretaries
- Italian Republican Party (PRI): 3 ministers, 3 undersecretaries
- Italian Democratic Socialist Party (PSDI): 2 ministers, 4 undersecretaries
- Italian Liberal Party (PLI): 1 minister, 4 undersecretaries

== Composition ==
Portfolio	Minister	Took office	Left office	Party
Prime Minister	Giovanni Goria	29 July 1987	13 April 1988	DC
Deputy Prime Minister	Giuliano Amato	29 July 1987	13 April 1988	PSI
Minister of Foreign Affairs	Giulio Andreotti	29 July 1987	13 April 1988	DC
Minister of the Interior	Amintore Fanfani	29 July 1987	13 April 1988	DC
Minister of Grace and Justice	Giuliano Vassalli	29 July 1987	13 April 1988	PSI
Minister of Budget and Economic Planning	Emilio Colombo	29 July 1987	13 April 1988	DC
Minister of Finance	Antonio Gava	29 July 1987	13 April 1988	DC
Minister of Treasury	Giuliano Amato	29 July 1987	13 April 1988	PSI
Minister of Defence	Valerio Zanone	29 July 1987	13 April 1988	PLI
Minister of Public Education	Giovanni Galloni	29 July 1987	13 April 1988	DC
Minister of Public Works	Emilio De Rose	29 July 1987	13 April 1988	PSDI
Minister of Agriculture and Forests	Filippo Maria Pandolfi	29 July 1987	13 April 1988	DC
Minister of Transport	Calogero Mannino	29 July 1987	13 April 1988	DC
Minister of Post and Telecommunications	Oscar Mammì	29 July 1987	13 April 1988	PRI
Minister of Industry, Commerce and Craftsmanship	Adolfo Battaglia	29 July 1987	13 April 1988	PRI
Minister of Health	Carlo Donat-Cattin	29 July 1987	13 April 1988	DC
Minister of Foreign Trade	Renato Ruggiero	29 July 1987	13 April 1988	PSI
Minister of Merchant Navy	Giovanni Prandini	29 July 1987	13 April 1988	DC
Minister of State Holdings	Luigi Granelli	29 July 1987	13 April 1988	DC
Minister of Labour and Social Security	Rino Formica	29 July 1987	13 April 1988	PSI
Minister of Cultural and Environmental Heritage	Carlo Vizzini	29 July 1987	13 April 1988	PSDI
Minister of Tourism and Entertainment	Franco Carraro	29 July 1987	13 April 1988	PSI
Minister of the Environment	Giorgio Ruffolo	29 July 1987	13 April 1988	PSI
Minister of Regional Affairs (without portfolio)	Aristide Gunnella	29 July 1987	13 April 1988	PRI
Minister for Social Affairs (without portfolio)	Rosa Russo Iervolino	29 July 1987	13 April 1988	DC
Minister for the Coordination of Community Policies (without portfolio)	Antonio Mario La Pergola	29 July 1987	13 April 1988	PSI
Minister for the Coordination of Civil Protection (without portfolio)	Remo Gaspari	29 July 1987	13 April 1988	DC
Minister for the Coordination of Scientific and Technological Research Initiatives (without portfolio)	Antonio Ruberti	29 July 1987	13 April 1988	PSI
Minister of Public Function (without portfolio)	Giorgio Santuz	29 July 1987	13 April 1988	DC
Minister for Extraordinary Interventions in the South (without portfolio)	Giovanni Goria	29 July 1987	13 April 1988	DC
Minister for Urban Areas Problems (without portfolio)	Carlo Tognoli	29 July 1987	13 April 1988	PSI
Minister for Parliamentary Relations (without portfolio)	Sergio Mattarella	29 July 1987	13 April 1988	DC
Secretary of the Council of Ministers	Emilio Rubbi	29 July 1987	13 April 1988	DC
