= Venanzio Nocchi =

Italian politician (1946–2025)

- Born: 27 April 1946
- Died: 6 July 2025 (aged 79)

Venanzio Nocchi (27 April 1946 – 6 July 2025) was an Italian politician.

== Life and career ==
Nocchi was born on 27 April 1946, and began his career in politics with the Italian Communist Party. He was mayor of Città di Castello from 1970 to 1980, then remained as a city councilor until 1993.

In the 1987 Italian general election he was elected senator with the Italian Communist Party. Following the Bolognina turning point, which it was declared that the party would change its name, logo, and orientation he joined the Democratic Party of the Left, with which he was confirmed in the Senate in 1992. He ended his parliamentary mandate in 1994.

He was re-elected city councilor in Città di Castello in 2001 with the Democrats, remaining in office until 2006.

Nocchi died on 6 July 2025, at the age of 79.
