= Maurizio Noci =

Italian politician (1937–2019)

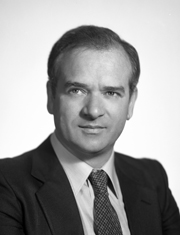
- Italian politician

Member of the Senate
- In office 1979–1983

Member of the Senate
- In office 1985^{1}–1988
- Preceded by: Libero Della Briotta

Member of the Chamber of Deputies
- In office 2 July 1987 – 22 April 1992

State Secretary Ministry of Agriculture and Forests
- In office 17 April 1991 – 28 June 1992
- President: Giulio Andreotti
- Preceded by: Francesco Cimino
- Succeeded by: Paolo Fogu

Personal details
- Born: 10 August 1937 Crema, Lombardy, Italy
- Died: 22 December 2019 (aged 82) Crema, Italy
- Party: Italian Socialist Party (until 1994); Italian Socialists
- Spouse: Manuela Pedrini

Maurizio Noci (10 August 1937 – 22 December 2019) was an Italian politician. He was a member of the Italian Chamber of Deputies, the Italian Senate and an undersecretary in the Ministry of Agriculture and Forests. Prior to his career in national politics, he was the mayor of Crema from 1975 to 1979.

== Biography ==
Maurizio Noci was born on 10 August 1937 in Crema, Lombardy. At 16, he joined the Young Socialists and became active in the party. After finding work at Everest, which later became Olivetti, he was a supporter of workers rights and was elected to the union leadership. He later joined the Italian Socialist Party as an organizer.

In 1975, he won the election for Mayor of Crema. As his first term wound down, he was approached to run for the Italian Senate and won a seat, becoming one of the youngest members of the body. He finished his first term in 1983. In 1985, with the death of Libero Della Briotta, Noci was elected to fill out the remaining term. For a period of time, he was also on the board of RAI, the Italian broadcaster.

In 1987, he ran for a seat in the Italian Chamber of Deputies. In 1991, Giulio Andreotti appointed him as an undersecretary in the Ministry of Agricultural, Food and Forestry Policies overseeing agriculture and forests. His term ended after Andreotti’s resignation as Prime Minister. After leaving government, he returned to Crema and won a seat on the municipal council.

Noci died on 22 December 2019 at the age of 82.

== Notes ==
1. Replaced Libero Della Briotta who died in office.
