= Matilde Callari Galli =

Italian academic and politician (born 1934)

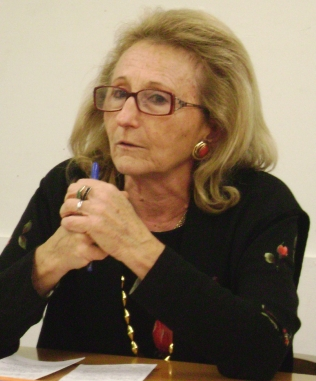

Member of the Senate
- In office 1987–1992

Personal details
- Born: 23 July 1934 (age 92) Terracina, Latina, Italy
- Party: Italian Communist Party
- Profession: Politician

Matilde Callari Galli (born 23 July 1934) is an Italian politician who served as Senator for one legislature (1987–1992).

== Biography ==
She has been teaching cultural anthropology at the Education sciences at the University of Bologna since 1970.

She served as a senator representing the Bologna II constituency for the Italian Communist Party during the 10th legislature, from 1987 to 1992; from 2 August 1989 to 22 April 1992, she was a member of the executive committee of the PCI parliamentary group, which became the PDS on 12 February 1991.

She is a member of the Italian Association for Ethno-Anthropological Sciences; from 1995 to 1998, she served as the association's president,and she was a member of the arbitration committee during the three-year terms of 1997–2000 and 2004–2007.

She is the coordinator of the Mappe Urbane research project, sponsored by the "Mappe Urbane" association. This research takes a transdisciplinary approach to exploring issues related to urban space, with a particular focus on the physical, architectural-urban, political, and socio-cultural transformations of the Bologna municipal area and beyond. One of the outcomes of this research was the creation of a geoblog titled "Percorsi emotivi" (Emotional Pathways), which explores residents' perceptions of their local area. She is also the coordinator of the research project New Poverty, Old Poverty, sponsored by the Gramsci Emilia-Romagna Foundation. This research group investigates the emergence of new forms of poverty in the Bologna context and at the national level.

She is the president of the "Don Paolo Serra Zanetti" Institution for Social and Community Inclusion of the City of Bologna.
