= Mario Biagioni =

Italian politician (1931–1989)

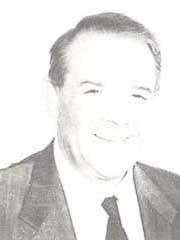

Member of the Senate of the Republic
- In office 23 June 1987 – 27 January 1989
- Constituency: Grosseto

Personal details
- Born: 12 October 1931 Roccastrada, Province of Grosseto, Kingdom of Italy
- Died: 27 January 1989 (aged 57) Grosseto, Tuscany, Italy
- Party: Italian Social Movement
- Occupation: Entrepreneur

Mario Biagioni (12 October 1931 – 27 January 1989) was an Italian politician and entrepreneur. A member of the Italian Social Movement (MSI), he served as a member of the Senate of the Republic during the 10th Legislature.

== Life and career ==
Biagioni was born in Roccastrada, Tuscany. He was elected to the Senate in the 1987 Italian general election for the Grosseto constituency as a candidate of the Italian Social Movement. During his parliamentary term he served on the Senate's Standing Committee on Public Works and Communications.

== Death ==
Biagioni died on 27 January 1989 under unclear circumstances. His body was found along the Pisa–Rome railway between the stations of Talamone and Alberese after he had boarded a train from Rome to Grosseto. Investigators believed he may have fallen from the moving train, although the circumstances of his death remained the subject of speculation.
