= Alcide Angeloni =

Italian politician (1926–2025)

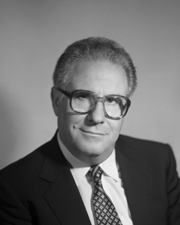
Alcide Angeloni

Alcide Angeloni (24 November 1926 – 20 September 2025) was an Italian politician who served as Senator for two legislatures (1983–1992). He died on 20 September 2025, at the age of 98.
