= Pietro Fabris (politician) =

Italian politician (1934–2022)

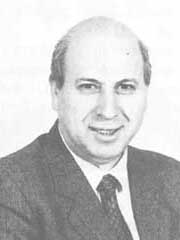
- Pietro Fabris

Mayor of Bassano del Grappa
- In office 14 December 1967 – 11 July 1975
- Preceded by: Pietro Roversi
- Succeeded by: Sergio Martinelli
- Constituency: Veneto

Member of the Senate of the Republic of Italy
- In office 2 July 1987 – 8 May 1996

Personal details
- Born: 16 November 1934 Bassano del Grappa, Italy
- Died: 2 October 2022 (aged 87) Bassano del Grappa, Italy
- Party: DC (until 1994); PPI (1994–1995); CDU (1995–1996)
- Occupation: Manager

Pietro Fabris (16 November 1934 – 2 October 2022) was an Italian politician. A member of the Christian Democracy party, the Italian People's Party, and later the United Christian Democrats, he served in the Senate of the Republic from 1987 to 1996.

Fabris died in Bassano del Grappa on 2 October 2022, at the age of 87.
