= Antonio Muratore =

Italian veterinarian and politician (1927–2023)

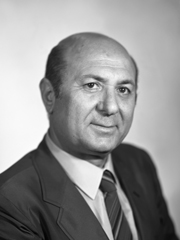
- Muratore in 1987

Member of the Senate of the Republic of Italy
- In office 12 July 1983 – 14 April 1994
- Constituency: Lazio

Personal details
- Born: 22 May 1927 Canicattì, Italy
- Died: 11 January 2023 (aged 95) Guidonia Montecelio, Italy
- Party: PSI
- Occupation: Veterinarian

Antonio Muratore (22 May 1927 – 11 January 2023) was an Italian veterinarian and politician. A member of the Italian Socialist Party, he served in the Senate of the Republic from 1983 to 1994.

Muratore died in Guidonia Montecelio on 11 January 2023, at the age of 95.
