= Renzo Sclavi =

Italian politician (1923–2018)

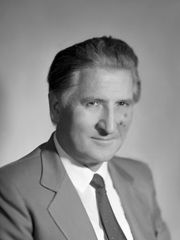

Senator of the Republic of Italy
- In office 12 July 1983 – 1 July 1987
- Constituency: Lombardy

Personal details
- Born: October 4, 1923 Canneto Pavese, Italy
- Died: August 21, 2018 (aged 94)
- Party: Italian Democratic Socialist Party
- Occupation: Building Contractor

Renzo Sclavi (4 October 1923 – 21 August 2018) was an Italian politician for the Italian Democratic Socialist Party.

== Biography ==
Sclavi was born in Canneto Pavese, Italy on October 4, 1923. Prior to entering politics he was a building contractor who operated a construction company in Stradella, Lombardy which he founded in 1947.

Sclavi was elected to the Italian Senate during legislature IX of Italy from the region of Lombardy for the Italian Democratic Socialist Party. Following the beginning of the Second Republic, he would reach out to Forza Italia politician Gian Carlo Abelli which blossomed into a long-lasting friendship.

He died on August 21, 2018, leaving his construction company in the hands of his children.
