= Costante Degan =

Italian politician (1930–1988)

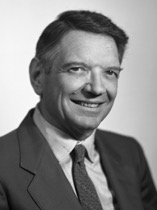

Minister of the Navy
- In office 1 August 1986 – 28 July 1987
- Preceded by: Gianuario Carta
- Succeeded by: Giovanni Prandini

Minister of Health
- In office 4 August 1983 – 1 August 1986
- Preceded by: Renato Altissimo
- Succeeded by: Carlo Donat-Cattin

Mayor of Venice
- In office 25 January 1988 – 12 February 1988
- Preceded by: Antonio Casellati
- Succeeded by: Antonio Casellati

Personal details
- Born: 12 March 1930 Mestre, Veneto, Italy
- Died: 1 July 1988 (aged 58) Mestre, Veneto, Italy
- Party: Christian Democracy
- Profession: Engineer

Costante Degan (12 March 1930 – 1 July 1988) was an Italian politician.

== Biography ==
Degan was born on 12 March 1930 in Mestre, Italy. He would get a degree in engineering before working as an engineer.

Degan joined the Christian Democracy after a long youth militancy in the Catholic Action. He was municipal councilor in Venice, then in Dolo, he also served as Mayor of Venice for a few days in 1988. He was a Deputy from 1963 to 1983 and a Senator from 1983 until his death in 1988.

Degan served several times as Undersecretary of State, subsequently he served as Minister of Health from 1983 to 1986 and as Minister of Merchant Navy from 1986 to 1987.

As Minister of Health, Degan dealt with assisted fertilization and radioactivity. Having held this position during the Chernobyl disaster in 1986, he was the author of the prohibitions on the sale of milk and broad-leaf vegetables during the days of the radioactive emergency. He also presented the first smoking ban bill in 1986 to ban cigarette use in restaurants.

Degan died in 1988 at the age of 58 due to lung cancer in Mestre.
