= Antonio Natali (politician) =

Italian politician (1921–1991)

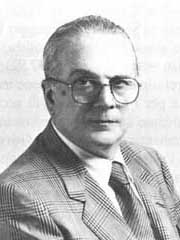

Antonio Natali (3 February 1921 - 22 March 1991) was an Italian politician.

== Life ==
Born in Voghera, he joined the PSI in 1945 and became political advisor to Guido Mazzali in the 1950s, citizen secretary of the PSI's Provincial Federation in 1964, provincial counsellor, regional counsellor in Lombardy and vice-president of the first regional 'giunta'. For several years he was president of the Metropolitana Milanese. He was considered political father to Bettino Craxi.

He was elected senator for the Rho college in the 1987 legislature, dying in Milan four years later before the end of the legislature. He was supported by Giovanni Beniamino Valcavi
