= Giuseppe Fimognari =

Italian physician and politician (1932–2024)

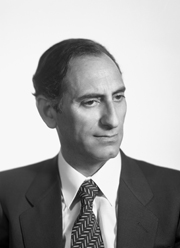
Giuseppe Fimognari

Giuseppe Beniamino Fimognari (1 November 1932 – 5 January 2024) was an Italian physician and politician.

A member of Christian Democracy, Fimognari was first elected mayor of Gerace in 1966 and served until 1983. He won his first election to the Italian Senate in 1979, was reelected to a second term in 1983, and stepped down in 1987. Fimognari served a second term as Gerace mayor from 1991 to 1993, and was a local health authority administrator in Locri from 1995 to 1996. He died on 5 January 2024, at the age of 91.
