= Carlo Boggio =

Italian politician (1931–2017)

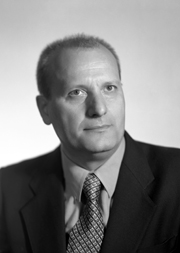
Carlo Boggio

Carlo Boggio (10 May 1931 – 12 July 2017) was an Italian politician who served as Mayor of Vercelli (1970–1975) and Senator for four legislatures (1976–1992).
