= Manlio Ianni =

Italian politician (1937–2019)

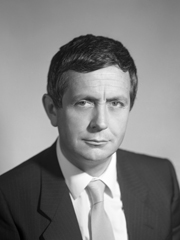

Member of the Senate of the Republic
- In office 19 July 1983 – 14 April 1994
- Constituency: Lazio

President of the Province of Rieti
- In office 6 November 1973 – 30 April 1975
- Preceded by: Leonardo Leonardi
- Succeeded by: Bruno Vella

Personal details
- Born: 3 April 1937 Contigliano, Province of Rieti, Kingdom of Italy
- Died: 23 August 2019 (aged 82) Rieti, Lazio, Italy
- Party: Christian Democracy; Italian People's Party
- Occupation: Teacher

Manlio Ianni (3 April 1937 – 23 August 2019) was an Italian politician of the Christian Democracy, who served as president of the Province of Rieti from 1973 to 1975 and as a member of the Senate of the Republic for three legislatures (1983–1994).
