= Franco Giustinelli =

Italian politician (1940–2025)

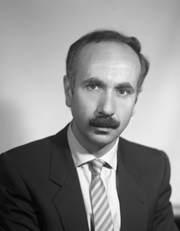

Member of the Senate of the Republic of Italy for Terni
- In office 12 July 1983 – 22 April 1992

Personal details
- Born: 16 June 1940; Terni, Italy
- Died: 20 January 2025 (aged 84); Rome, Italy
- Political party: PCI (until 1991); PDS (from 1991)
- Occupation: Schoolteacher

Franco Giustinelli (16 June 1940 – 20 January 2025) was an Italian politician. A member of the Italian Communist Party and subsequently the Democratic Party of the Left, he served in the Senate of the Republic from 1983 to 1992.

Giustinelli died in Rome on 20 January 2025, at the age of 84.
