= Alfredo Mantica =

Italian politician (1943–2026)

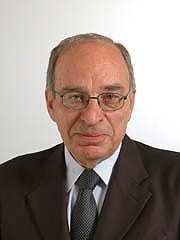

Italian Republic Senator from Lombardy
- In office 2 July 1987 – 22 April 1992
- In office 9 May 1996 – 14 March 2013

Personal details
- Born: 17 July 1943 Rimini, Emilia Romagna, Italy
- Died: 17 September 2026 (aged 83) Gardone Riviera, Lombardy, Italy
- Party: MSI (till 1995); AN (1995-2009); PdL (2009-2012); FdI (2012-2026)
- Education: Sacro Cuore Catholic University of Milan
- Occupation: Business advisor

Alfredo Mantica (17 July 1943 – 17 September 2026) was an Italian politician. He served as Undersecretary for Foreign Affairs in the Berlusconi IV Cabinet.

== Life and career ==
Mantica was married and was the father of two children. He earned a degree in Economics from the Sacro Cuore Catholic University of Milan in 1967.

He was elected to the Senate of the 10th Legislature on the Movimento Sociale Italiano-Destra Nazionale (Italian Social Movement–National Right) Party ticket in 1987 in the Milan 3 constituency. Re-elected to the Senate of the 13th Legislature on 21 April 1996 in the Lombardy 14 constituency (Monza). Re-elected to the Senate of the 14th Legislature on 13 May 2001 in the Lombardy 14 constituency (Monza). Re-elected to the Senate of the 15th Legislature on 9 April 2006 in the Lombardy constituency and re-elected to the Senate of the 16th Legislature on 13 April 2008 in the Lombardy constituency.

Mantica died in Gardone Riviera, Lombardy on 17 September 2026, at the age of 83.

== Institutional posts and parliamentary activities ==
10th Legislature: member of the Italian Social Movement Group, member of the Finance and Treasury Committee and member of the Council for European Community Affairs. Member of the 10th Standing Committee (Industry, trade, tourism).

10th and 13th Legislatures: Member of the 5th Standing Committee (Budget). 10th and 13th Legislatures: Member of the 6th Standing Committee (Finance and Treasury).

13th Legislature: Acting Vice Chairman of the Alleanza Nazionale (National Alliance) Party. Chairman of the Consultative Committee of both Houses on tax registry surveillance. Member of the Parliamentary Commission of Inquiry into terrorism in Italy and the failure to identify the perpetrators of attacks.

14th Legislature: Appointed Secretary of State for Foreign Affairs (2nd Berlusconi government), with special responsibility for the Mediterranean and Middle East, Africa and Cooperation.

15th Legislature: Member of the 3rd Standing Committee (Foreign Affairs and Emigration) Vice Chairman of the 3rd Standing Committee (Foreign Affairs and Emigration) Member of the Special Committee for the protection and promotion of human rights.

16th Legislature: Appointed Secretary of State for Foreign Affairs (4th Berlusconi government) 12 May 2008, with special responsibility for bilateral relations with the countries of Europe and the former Soviet countries of Asia and the Caucasus; relations with the institutions of the EU; exercising the presidency of the National Committee for the Promotion of Italian Culture Abroad; general policy regarding Italian communities abroad and their integration and rights; enhancement of the role of Italian business enterprises abroad; and coordination of initiatives aimed at the reinforcement and rationalisation of the consular network.

== Party appointments ==
- Movimento Sociale Italiano-Destra Nazionale (Italian Social Movement–National Right) in 1958.
- MSI-DN Central Committee, 1965.
- Cinisello Balsamo City Councillor, 1970.
- Milan City Councillor from 1971 to 1990.
- Provincial Councillor from 1995 to 1997.
- Member of the Allianza Nazionale (National Alliance) Party National Political Board since 1988.
- Member of the Popolo della Libertà (The People of Freedom).
