= Gianuario Carta =

Italian politician (1931–2017)

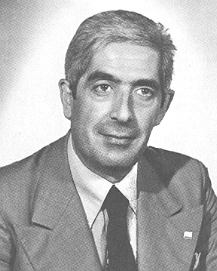

Minister of the Merchant Navy
- In office 4 August 1983 – 31 July 1986
- Preceded by: Michele Di Giesi
- Succeeded by: Costante Degan

Senator of the Republic
- In office 12 July 1983 – 22 April 1992
- Constituency: Sardinia

Italian Chamber of Deputies
- In office 6 June 1968 – 11 July 1983
- Constituency: Cagliari

Personal details
- Born: 1 January 1931 Bitti, Italy
- Died: 14 February 2017 (aged 86) Cagliari, Italy
- Party: Christian Democracy
- Education: Università Cattolica del Sacro Cuore
- Profession: Lawyer, politician

Gianuario (Ariuccio) Carta, (1 January 1931 – 14 February 2017) was an Italian politician of the Christian Democracy political party.

== Biography ==
Born in Bitti, Sardinia, on 1 January 1931, Carta graduated with a law degree from Università Cattolica del Sacro Cuore. He was a lawyer and president of province of Nuoro lawyers.

Prior to entering national politics he served on a regional council in 1965. Carta was first elected to the Italian Chamber of Deputies in 1968 as a Christian Democrat, where he would continue to serve until 1983. Following this, he took a position in the Italian Senate, where he remained from 1983 to 1992. During this period, he also served as minister of the Merchant Navy from 1983 to 1986, in the Craxi I Cabinet.

During the 10th legislature, he was called to chair the Senate's parliamentary Agriculture and Forestry Committee, and subsequently, starting from its establishment, the bicameral parliamentary commission of inquiry on the scandal of the branch of the Banca Nazionale del Lavoro (BNL) in Atlanta.

He served as the lawyer of the Melis family who successfully sued the Ministry of Defense for the death of family member who died from depleted uranium poisoning after serving in Kosovo.

He died in Cagliari on 14 February 2017.
