= Vito Bellafiore =

Italian politician (born 1929)

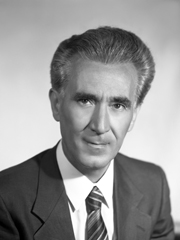
Vito Bellafiore

Vito Bellafiore (born 11 July 1929) is an Italian politician who served as Senator for two legislatures (1983–1992).

== Biography ==
A teacher by profession, he has been a member of the Italian Communist Party since his early youth and soon joined the party’s provincial and regional organizations.

In 1971, he was elected to the Sicilian Regional Assembly on the joint PCI–PSIUP ticket with 23,388 votes and served on the Public Works Committee. He did not run for re-election in the subsequent regional elections.

He has served as mayor of the municipality of Santa Ninfa for 28 consecutive years, playing a key role in numerous political and cultural initiatives aimed at the reconstruction and revitalization of the Valle del Belice.

On June 26, 1983, he was elected to the Senate of the Republic (Italy) as a member of the Italian Communist Party (PCI) in the Alcamo constituency, receiving 26,602 votes. During his term in office, he served on the Finance and Treasury Committee and on the parliamentary commission responsible for allocating funds for the Belice earthquake.

He was then re-elected to the Senate in the 1987 elections in the Alcamo constituency with 25,139 votes, but in February 1988, following an appeal by another candidate from the Agrigento constituency and the subsequent recount of the votes, he was declared to have lost his seat.
