= Boris Ulianich =

Italian politician (1925–2023)

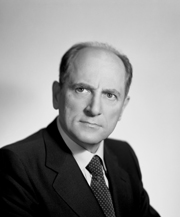

Member of Senate of the Republic Italy
- In office 1979–1992

Personal details
- Born: 12 February 1925 Boljun, Italy
- Died: 31 March 2023 (aged 98)
- Profession: Politician

Boris Ulianich (12 February 1925 – 31 March 2023) was an Italian politician. He was a senator from 1979 to 1992.
