= Francesco Greco =

Italian lawyer and politician (1942–2018)

Francesco Achille Greco
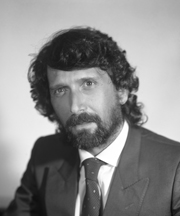

Senator of the Republic of Italy
- In office 12 July 1983 – 14 April 1994

Personal details
- Born: 9 November 1942 vimercate, lombardia, Italia
- Died: 1 October 2018 (aged 75) Catania
- Party: Italian Socialist Party (1983–1987); Italian Communist Party (1987-1992); Democratic Party of the Left (1992-1994)
- Occupation: Lawyer

Francesco Achille Greco (9 November 1942 – 1 October 2018), also known as Franco Greco, was an Italian lawyer and politician.

He was elected to the Italian Senate from 1983 to 1994 in the region of Sicily for numerous parties. First, he served as a member of the Italian Socialist Party, joining the Italian Communist Party in January 1987, and finally joining the Democratic Party of the Left in April 1992.
