= Vittorio Marniga =

Italian politician (born 1945)

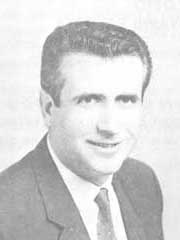

Member of the Senate of the Republic
- In office 2 July 1987 – 14 April 1994
- Constituency: Lombardy – Breno

President of the Province of Brescia
- In office 12 June 1985 – 30 November 1987
- Preceded by: Bruno Boni
- Succeeded by: Costanzo Valli

Mayor of Edolo
- In office 8 June 2009 – 26 May 2014
- Preceded by: Berardo Branella
- Succeeded by: Luca Masneri
- In office 27 May 1990 – 24 April 1995
- Preceded by: Luciano Chiesa
- Succeeded by: Gianpiero De Toni

Personal details
- Born: 10 November 1945 (age 80) Edolo, Province of Brescia, Kingdom of Italy
- Party: Italian Socialist Party
- Occupation: Entrepreneur

Vittorio Marniga (born 10 November 1945) is an Italian politician and entrepreneur. A member of the Italian Socialist Party, he served as president of the Province of Brescia from 1985 to 1987 and as a member of the Italian Senate from 1987 to 1994. He also served as mayor of Edolo.
