= Elena Marinucci =

Italian politician

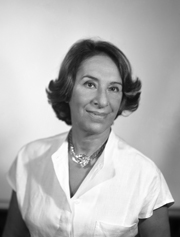
- Born: 18 August 1928; L'Aquila
- Died: 31 March 2023 (aged 94); Rome
- Occupations: lawyer and politician

Elena Marinucci (August 18, 1928 – March 31, 2023) was an Italian lawyer, teacher and politician. She joined politics to support the legalisation of divorce in Italy. She championed the so-called "pink quotas" to ensure that women were more fairly represented. She was a member of the European parliament and an Italian senator.

== Life ==
Marinucci was born and educated in L’Aquila. She went to the University of Rome to study law and then she practiced law. In 1951 she married a fellow lawyer who was also a politician named Nello Mariani In 1965 she began to teach the law.

There was a large debate in Italy when it was proposed to legalise divorce in Italy. In 1970 Loris Fortuna and Antonio Baslini decided to change the law. Their proposal gathered political support but it was opposed by the Christian Democratic Party. Marinucci became very involved in supporting their proposal. The law, which legalized and regulated divorce in Italy, was then approved on December 1, 1970. This law is known as "Fortuna–Baslini law".

Prime Minister Bettino Craxi recognised her qualities and she became a leader of women within his party during the 1980s. In 1984 she was the President of National Committee for Equal Opportunities within the Prime Minister's office trying to draft and table amendments to statutes that favoured women.

In 1994 she was elected to represent the Partito socialista italiano in the European parliament. She joined the Group of the Party of European Socialists within the parliament and she was a member of that group until 1999 although her allegiances with the Italian socialist parties changed.

In 2017 Anna Maria Isastia published her biographical conversations with Marinucci. Marinucci died in Rome in 2023 at the age of 94.
