= Bruno Vella =

Italian politician (1933–2021)

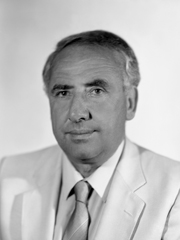
- Vella in the 1980s

President of the Province of Rieti
- In office 20 October 1975 – 8 March 1982
- Preceded by: Manlio Ianni
- Succeeded by: Giovanni Antonini

Mayor of Rieti
- In office 10 March 1982 – 13 September 1983
- Preceded by: Ettore Saletti
- Succeeded by: Augusto Giovannelli

Member of the Senate of the Republic of Italy
- In office 12 July 1983 – 22 April 1992
- Constituency: Lazio

Personal details
- Born: 3 April 1933 Fermo, Kingdom of Italy
- Died: 13 November 2021 (aged 88)
- Party: PSI

Bruno Vella (3 April 1933 – 13 November 2021) was an Italian politician. A member of the Italian Socialist Party, he served as President of the Province of Rieti from 1975 to 1982, Mayor of Rieti from 1982 to 1983, and served on the Senate of the Republic from 1983 to 1992.
