= Claudio Beorchia =

Italian politician (born 1932)

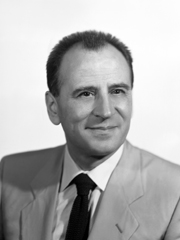

Member of the Senate
- In office 1976–1992

Personal details
- Born: 26 February 1932 (age 94) Udine, Friuli-Venezia Giulia, Italy
- Party: Christian Democracy
- Profession: Politician, advocate

Claudio Beorchia (born 26 February 1932) is an Italian politician who served as Senator for four legislatures (1976–1992).
