= Eugenio Bozzello Verole =

Italian politician (1928–2024)

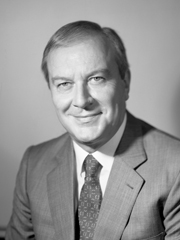

Member of the Senate of the Republic of Italy for Ivrea
- In office 20 June 1979 – 22 April 1992

Personal details
- Born: 30 August 1928 Castellamonte, Italy
- Died: 2 April 2024 (aged 95) Castellamonte, Italy
- Party: PSI

Eugenio Bozzello Verole (30 August 1928 – 2 April 2024) was an Italian politician. A member of the Italian Socialist Party, he served in the Senate of the Republic from 1979 to 1992.

Bozzello Verole died in Castellamonte on 2 April 2024, at the age of 95.
