= Achille Cutrera =

Italian politician (1929–2018)

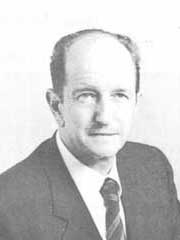
Achille Cutrera

Achille Cutrera (24 April 1929 – 10 October 2018) was an Italian politician.

Cutrera was born in Milan and trained as a lawyer. In the 1970s, he helped publish Il Giornale della Lombardia. He twice won election to the Senate, in 1987 and 1992.
