= Ignazio Marcello Gallo =

Italian politician (1924–2023)

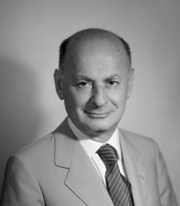

Member of the Senate of the Republic of Italy
- In office 12 July 1983 – 22 April 1992

Personal details
- Born: 4 May 1924 Rome, Italy
- Died: 6 August 2023 (aged 99) Turin, Italy
- Party: DC
- Education: University of Turin
- Occupation: Jurist

Ignazio Marcello Gallo (4 May 1924 – 6 August 2023) was an Italian jurist and politician. Originally from Cosenza, but registered in Rome, he was a student of Francesco Antolisei, professor at the University of Urbino, then of criminal law at the University of Turin and professor emeritus at the "La Sapienza" University of Rome.

During his years of teaching at the University of Turin, he trained many students (including C.F. Grosso, G. Neppi-Modena, Luciano Violante, Mario Trapani, Aldo Regina, Ivo Caraccioli and Giuliano Marini), who followed the teachings of Marcello Gallo.

Among his main works, The theory of "finalistic" action in the most recent German doctrine; The unitary concept of guilt; Intentional intent, object and assessment; Outlines of a doctrine on the complicity of people in the crime; Notes on Criminal Law, general and special parts, 2021, vols. 1, 2, 3; The acquittal formulas of merit; Government of laws; Most esteemed Professor Kelsen; Mortara's little phrase; Notes from a criminal lawyer on a sovereign constitution (for how long?) The sources revisited; The rule and judgment; Morality; On the rights, in the studio in honor of Armando Veneto.

In 1983 he was elected senator in the ranks of the Christian Democrats, and was then reconfirmed in 1987: in the latter legislature he chaired the parliamentary commission for the opinion to the government on the delegated rules relating to the new code of criminal procedure, from which came the definitive green light to the Pisapia-Vassalli code. He ended his parliamentary mandate in 1992: not before inspiring the culpable charging reform of the aggravating circumstances of the crime, L. n.19 / 1990.

M. Gallo, former academician of the Lincei, died in 2023, almost a centenary.
