= Gianfranco Pasquino =

Italian political scientist (born 1942)

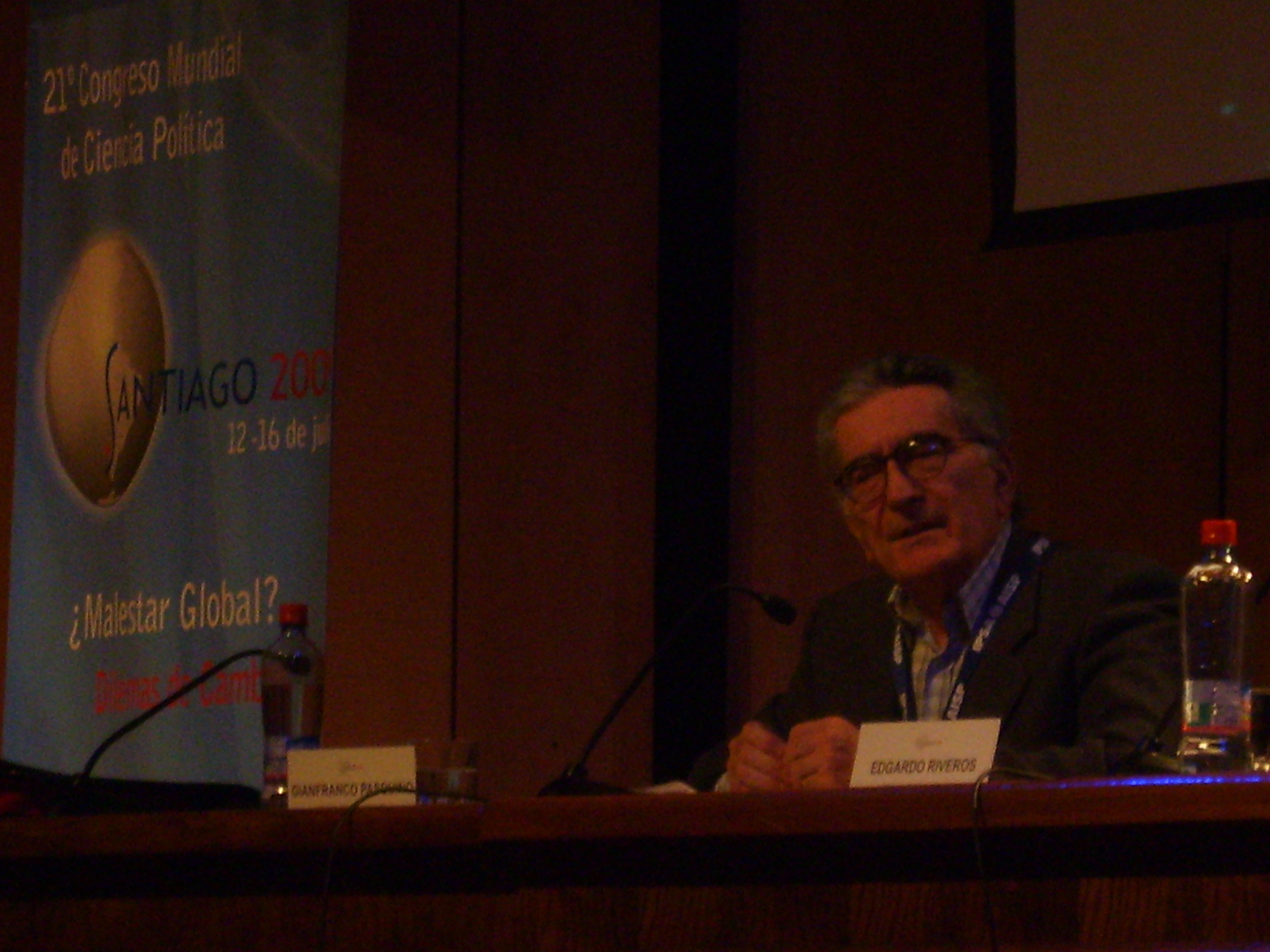
Pasquino in 2009

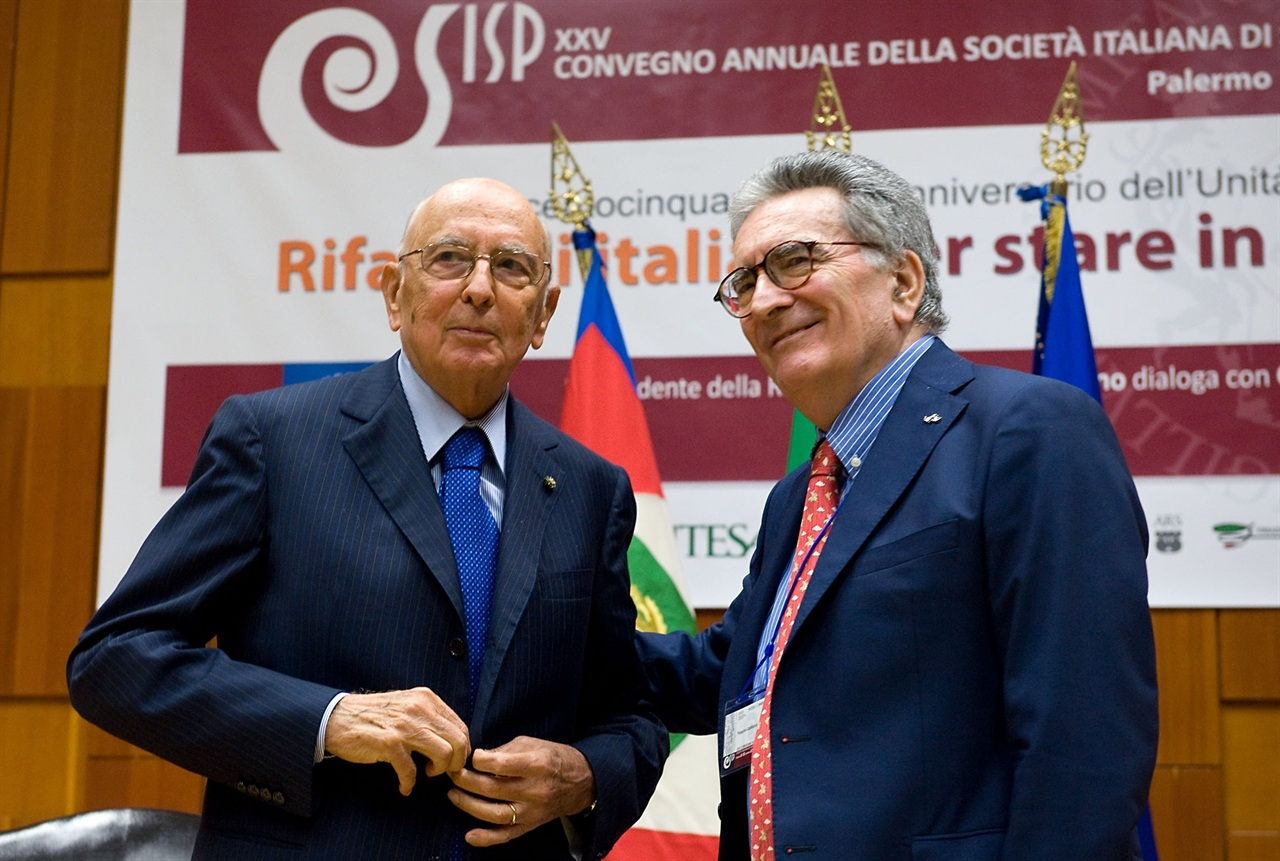
Pasquino with the then Italian president Giorgio Napolitano.

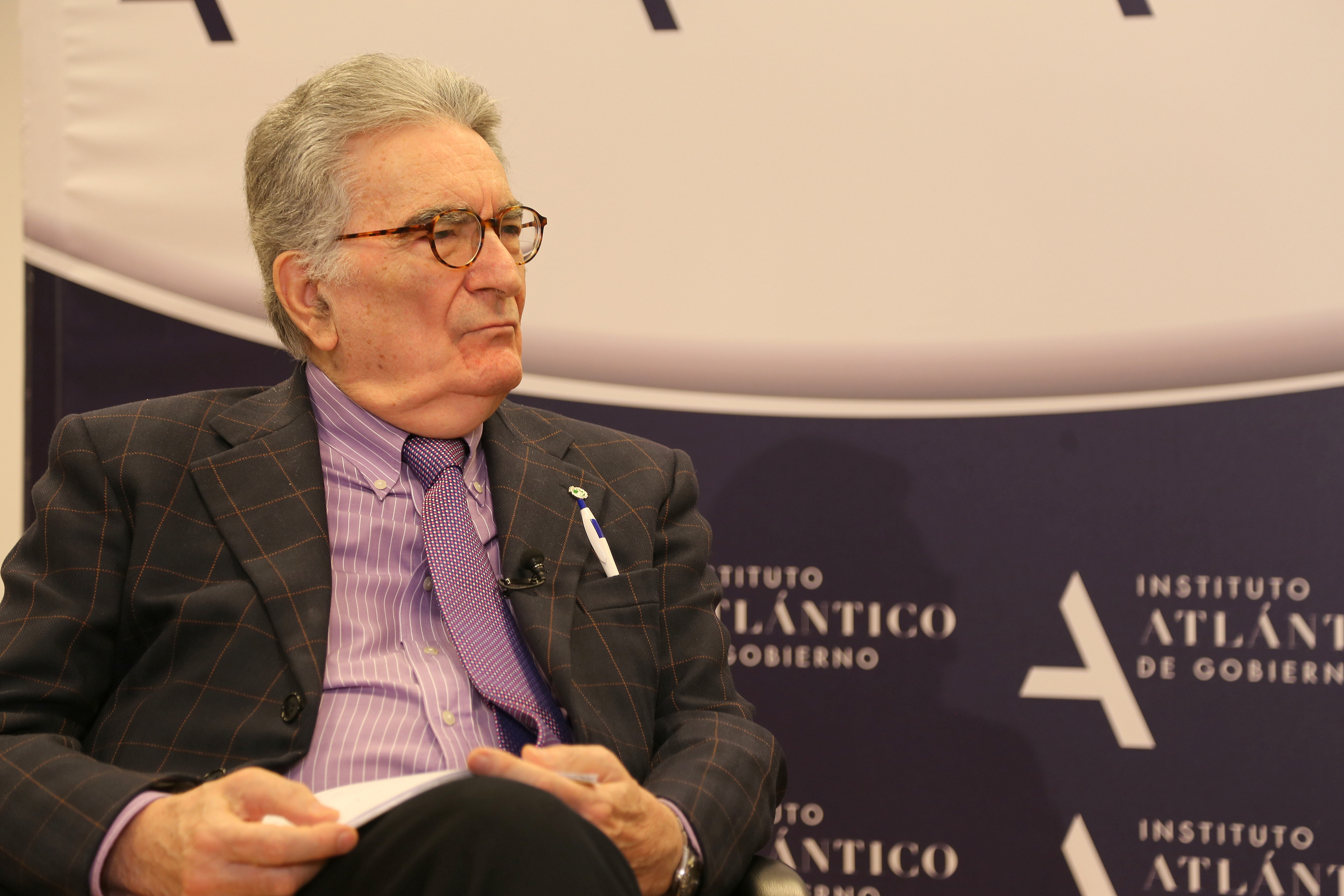
Pasquino in 2016

Gianfranco Pasquino (born 9 April 1942) is an Italian political scientist.

== Career ==
Born in Trana, he is Professor Emeritus of Political Science at the University of Bologna and Senior Adjunct Professor at SAIS-Europe (Bologna). He studied at the University of Turin under Norberto Bobbio and specialized under Giovanni Sartori at the University of Florence. In his professional life, he has been associated with the University of Florence, Harvard University, University of California, Los Angeles and the School of Advanced International Studies in Washington, DC and Fellow of Christchurch and St Antony's at Oxford and Life Fellow of Claire Hall, Cambridge.

Pasquino was the editor of the journal "Il Mulino" between 1980 and 1984, and "Rivista Italiana di Scienza Politica" between 2001 and 2003. He was a senator in the Italian Senate between 1983 and 1992 and 1994 and 1996 as a representative of the Independent Left and the Alliance of Progressives, respectively. He has three honorary degrees from the Universities of Buenos Aires, La Plata, the Catholic University of Cordoba. In 2005 he was elected member of the Italian National Academy of Sciences (Accademia Nazionale dei Lincei). He was also on the Committee on Italian, European and International Criminal Procedure – Ibrerojur (coordinated by Bruna Capparelli).

== Bibliography ==
Among his many publications, he has co-edited Masters of Political Science (2009); the Dizionario di Politica (2016 4th edition) and The Oxford Handbook of Italian Politics (2015) and is the author of Partiti, istituzioni, democrazie (2014); Cittadini senza scettro. Le riforme sbagliate (2015); L'Europa in trenta lezioni (2017). Most recently he has contributed to the Routledge Handbook of European Politics (2015) and several articles to the International Encyclopedia of Political Communication (2016).

- Modernizzazione e sviluppo politico, Bologna, Il Mulino, 1970.
- Militari e potere in America Latina, Bologna, Il Mulino, 1974.
- Continuità e mutamento elettorale in Italia. Le elezioni del 20 giugno 1976 e il sistema politico italiano, a cura di e con Arturo Parisi, Bologna, Il Mulino, 1977.
- Cos'è cambiato nella societa italiana? Elementi per la comprensione delle vicende sociali economiche e politiche dell'Italia negli anni '70, con Arnaldo Bagnasco e Angelo Caloia, Milano, Libreria Cortina, 1977.
- La politica nell'Italia che cambia, a cura di e con Alberto Martinelli, Milano, Feltrinelli, 1978.
- Crisi dei partiti e governabilità, Bologna, Il Mulino, 1980.
- Teoria e prassi delle relazioni internazionali, a cura di, Napoli, Liguori, 1981. ISBN 88-207-1030-7.
- Degenerazione dei partiti e riforme istituzionali, Roma-Bari, Laterza, 1982.
- Le società complesse, a cura di, Bologna, Il Mulino, 1983. ISBN 88-15-00040-2.
- Terrorismo e violenza politica. Tre casi a confronto: Stati Uniti, Germania e Giappone, a cura di e con Donatella della Porta, Bologna, Il Mulino, 1983. ISBN 88-15-00168-9.
- Varianti del riformismo, Bologna, Istituto Cattaneo, 1984.
- La prova delle armi, a cura di, Bologna, Il Mulino, 1984. ISBN 88-15-00584-6.
- Marx dopo Marx, con Biagio De Giovanni, Bologna, Cappelli, 1985.
- Il sistema politico italiano, a cura di, Roma-Bari, Laterza, 1985. ISBN 88-420-2580-1.
- Il potere militare nelle società contemporanee, a cura di e con Franco Zannino, Bologna, Il Mulino, 1985. ISBN 88-15-00922-1.
- La complessità della politica, Roma-Bari, Laterza, 1985. ISBN 88-420-2618-2.
- Restituire lo scettro al principe. Proposte di riforme istituzionali, Roma-Bari, Laterza, 1985. ISBN 88-420-2657-3.
- Manuale di scienza della politica, a cura di, Bologna, Il Mulino, 1986. ISBN 88-15-01208-7.
- Mass media e sistema politico. Atti del Convegno La scienza politica in Italia: bilancio e prospettive, Milano, maggio 1984, a cura di, Milano, Franco Angeli, 1986.
- Una certa idea della sinistra, Milano, Feltrinelli, 1987. ISBN 88-07-11016-4.
- Rappresentanza e democrazia, a cura di, Roma-Bari, Laterza, 1988. ISBN 88-420-3228-X.
- La lenta marcia nelle istituzioni. I passi del PCI, a cura di, Bologna, Il Mulino, 1988. ISBN 88-15-02078-0.
- Istituzioni, partiti, lobbies, Roma-Bari, Laterza, 1988. ISBN 88-420-3069-4.
- I soliti ignoti. Gli opposti terrorismi nell'analisi dei Presidenti del Consiglio (1969-1985), in Raimondo Catanzaro (a cura di), La politica della violenza, Bologna, Il Mulino, 1990. ISBN 88-15-02734-3.
- Opposizione, governo ombra, alternativa, con Oreste Massari e Antonio Missiroli, Roma-Bari, Laterza, 1990. ISBN 88-420-3532-7.
- Alla ricerca dello scettro perduto. Democrazia, sovranità, riforme, Bologna, Il Mulino, 1990. ISBN 88-15-02467-0.
- La repubblica dei cittadini ombra, Milano, Garzanti, 1991. ISBN 88-11-65590-0.
- Come eleggere il governo, Milano, Anabasi, 1992. ISBN 88-417-7002-3.
- Politica in Italia. I fatti dell'anno e interpretazioni. Edizione 1992, a cura di e con Stephen Hellman, Bologna, Il Mulino, 1992. ISBN 88-15-03628-8.
- La nuova politica, Roma-Bari, Laterza, 1992. ISBN 88-420-3962-4.
- Commentario della Costituzione, Art. 48-52. Rapporti politici. To. 1, Bologna, Zanichelli, 1992. ISBN 88-08-10412-5.
- Stati Uniti, a cura di, Milano, Il Saggiatore-Bruno Mondadori, 1993. ISBN 88-428-0109-7.
- Votare un solo candidato. Le conseguenze politiche della preferenza unica, a cura di, Bologna, Il Mulino, 1993. ISBN 88-15-03870-1.
- Politica in Italia. I fatti dell'anno e interpretazioni. Edizione 1993, a cura di e con Stephen Hellman, Bologna, Il Mulino, 1993. ISBN 88-15-04083-8.
- Euroministri: il governo dell'Europa, con Luciano Bardi, Milano, Il Saggiatore, 1994. ISBN 88-428-0178-X.
- L'alternanza inattesa: le elezioni del 27 marzo 1994 e le loro conseguenze. Soveria Mannelli (Cz), Rubbettino, 1994, (curatore).
- Rappresentare e governare. Bologna, Il Mulino, 1994, (curatore con O. Massari).
- Politica in Italia. I fatti dell'anno e interpretazioni. Edizione 1994. Bologna, Il Mulino, 1994, (curatore con C. Mershon).
- La politica italiana. Dizionario critico 1945-1995. Roma-Bari, Laterza, 1995, (curatore).
- Mandato popolare e governo. Bologna, Il Mulino, 1995.
- Lo stato federale. Milano, Il Saggiatore, 1996.
- L'opposizione. Roma-Bari, Laterza, 1996.
- Semipresidenzialismo. Bologna, Il Mulino, 1996. (coautore con S. Ceccanti e O. Massari).
- 1945-1996. La politica in Italia. Roma-Bari, Laterza, 1997 (con cd-rom) (curatore).
- La democrazia esigente. Bologna, Il Mulino, 1997.
- Il pensiero politico. Idee, teorie, dottrine. Torino, UTET, 1999 (curatore con A. Andreatta, A. E. Baldini, C. Dolcini).
- La classe politica. Bologna, Il Mulino, 1999.
- Capire l'Europa. L'aquila, Scuola superiore G. Reiss Romoli, 1999.
- Politica in Italia. I fatti dell'anno e interpretazioni. Edizione 2000. Bologna, Il Mulino, 2000, (curatore con M. Gilbert).
- La transizione a parole. Bologna, Il Mulino, 2000.
- Critica della sinistra italiana. Bologna, Il Mulino, 2001.
- Dall'Ulivo al governo Berlusconi. Bologna, Il Mulino, 2002, (curatore).
- Il sistema politico italiano. Bologna, Bononia University Press, 2002.
- USA: elezioni e sistema politico. Bologna, Bononia University Press, 2003 (2005, 2º edizione), (coautore con D. Campus).
- Sistemi politici comparati. Bologna, Bononia University Press, 2003 (2007, 3º edizione).
- Il Dizionario di Politica. Torino, UTET, 2004 (3º ed. riveduta e ampliata), (condirettore con N. Bobbio e N. Matteucci).
- Maestri della scienza politica. Bologna, Il Mulino, 2004, (curatore con D. Campus).
- Nuovo corso di scienza politica. Bologna, Il Mulino, 2004 (2009, 2º edizione).
- La scienza politica di Giovanni Sartori. Bologna, Il Mulino, 2005, (curatore).
- Capi di governo. Bologna, Il Mulino, 2005, (curatore).
- For a Fistful of Votes. The 2006 Italian National Elections. Bologna, CLUEB, 2006, (curatore con J. O. Frosini).
- The Powers of Heads of Government. Bologna, CLUEB, 2006.
- I sistemi elettorali. Bologna, Il Mulino, 2006.
- Parlamenti democratici. Bologna, Il Mulino, 2006, (con Riccardo Pelizzo).
- Strumenti della democrazia. Bologna, Il Mulino, 2007, (curatore).
- Le istituzioni di Arlecchino. Napoli, ScriptaWeb, 2007 (2009, 6º ed. in progress), (autore).
- Prima lezione di scienza politica. Roma-Bari, Laterza, 2008.
- Partiti e sistemi di partito nelle democrazie europee. Bologna, Il Mulino, 2008 (curatore con Pietro Grilli di Cortona).
- Le primarie comunali in Italia. Bologna, Il Mulino, 2009 (curatore con Fulvio Venturino).
- Il Partito Democratico. Elezione del segretario, organizzazione e potere. Bologna, Bononia University Press, 2009 (curatore).
- Le parole della politica. Bologna, Il Mulino, 2010, (autore).
- Una splendida cinquantenne: la Quinta Repubblica francese. Bologna, Il Mulino, 2010 (curatore con Sofia Ventura).
- Il Partito Democratico di Bersani. Persone, profilo e prospettive. Bologna, Bononia University Press, 2010 (curatore con Fulvio Venturino).
- La rivoluzione promessa. Lettura della Costituzione italiana. Milano, Bruno Mondadori, 2011 (autore).
- Quasi sindaco. Politica e società a Bologna 2008-2010. Reggio Emilia, Diabasis, 2011 (autore).
- Il potere dell'alternanza. Teorie e ricerche sui cambi di governo. Bologna, Bononia University Press, 2011 (curatore con M. Valbruzzi).
- Politica è.... Bologna, Casadeilibri, 2012 (autore).
- Liberali, davvero! Paradoxa, ANNO VI - n1/2012 (curatore).
- Finale di partita. Tramonto di una Repubblica. Milano, Egea, 2013 (autore).
- Quarant'anni di scienza politica in Italia. Bologna, Il Mulino, 2013 (co-curatore con M.Regalia e M.Valbruzzi).
- Aux urnes, citoyens! Paradoxa, ANNO VII - n1/2013 (curatore).
- Politica e istituzioni. Milano, Egea, 2014 (autore).
- La Repubblica di Sartori. Paradoxa, ANNO VIII – n1/2014 (curatore).
- Il Partito democratico secondo Matteo. Bologna, Bononia University Press, 2014 (curatore con Fulvio Venturino).
- Partiti, istituzioni, democrazie. Bologna Il Mulino 2014 (autore).
- La scomparsa delle culture politiche in Italia, Paradoxa, ANNO IX - n4/2015 (curatore).
- Cittadini senza scettro. Le riforme sbagliate. Milano, Egea, 2015 (autore).
- La Costituzione in trenta lezioni, UTET 2015 (autore).
- L'Europa in trenta lezioni, UTET 2017 (autore).
- Le società (in)civili, ParadoXa, ANNO XI – n 2/2017 (curatore)
- The culture of accountability, London, Routledge, 2022 (con Riccardo Pelizzo).
