= Angelo Pavan =

Italian politician (1930–2026)

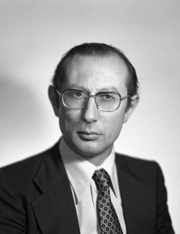

Member of the Senate of the Republic of Italy
- In office 20 June 1979 – 14 April 1994

Personal details
- Born: 17 November 1930 Postioma, Italy
- Died: 9 April 2026 (aged 95) Postioma, Italy
- Party: DC
- Occupation: Civil servant

Angelo Pavan (17 November 1930 – 9 April 2026) was an Italian politician. A member of Christian Democracy, he served in the Senate of the Republic from 1979 to 1994.

Pavan died in Postioma on 9 April 2026, at the age of 95.
