= Luigi Panigazzi =

Italian politician (1925–2021)

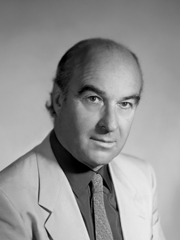

Member of the Senate of the Republic of Italy
- In office 12 July 1983 – 1 July 1987
- Constituency: Lombardy

Personal details
- Born: 5 February 1925 Val di Nizza, Italy
- Died: 12 May 2021 (aged 96) Val di Nizza, Italy
- Party: PSI

Luigi Panigazzi (5 February 1925 – 12 May 2021) was an Italian politician.

As a child, Panigazzi was an altar boy for Luigi Orione. Panigazzi studied medicine at the University of Pavia. Panigazzi joined the Italian Socialist Party in 1945. He was President of the Province of Pavia from 1962 to 1972, Mayor of Val di Nizza between 1972 and 1978, and vice president of the Province of Pavia from 1978 to 1981. He was a member of the Senate of the Republic during the Legislature IX from 1983 to 1987.

Panigazzi was vice president of the board of directors of the Policlinico San Matteo from 1981 to 1983, and elevated to president of the board in 1988.
