= Cornelio Masciadri =

Italian politician (1923–2008)

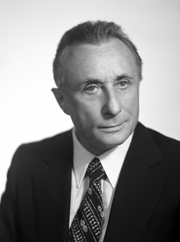
Cornelio Masciadri

Cornelio Masciadri (25 October 1923 – 2 January 2008) was an Italian politician who served as Mayor of Novara (1962–1967), Deputy (1968–1976) and Senator (1979–1992).
