= Michele Achilli =

Italian politician (1931–2023)

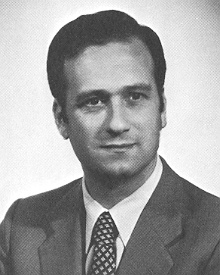

Member of the Chamber of Deputies of Italy
- In office 12 January 1967 – 1 July 1987
- Constituency: Milan

Member of the Senate of the Republic of Italy
- In office 2 July 1987 – 22 April 1992
- Constituency: Lombardy

Personal details
- Born: 22 July 1931 Milan, Italy
- Died: 4 August 2023 (aged 92) Milan, Italy
- Party: PSI
- Occupation: Urban planner

Michele Achilli (22 July 1931 – 4 August 2023) was an Italian urban planner and politician. A member of the Italian Socialist Party, he served in the Chamber of Deputies from 1967 to 1987 and the Senate of the Republic from 1987 to 1992.

Achilli died on 4 August 2023, at the age of 92.
