= Roberto Romei =

Italian politician (1926–2013)

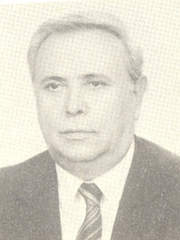
Roberto Romei

Roberto Romei (20 December 1926 – 5 December 2013) was an Italian politician.

Romei was born in Montevarchi on 20 December 1926. He was general secretary of the Milan branch of the Italian Confederation of Workers' Trade Unions between 1968 and 1973. Romei left Milan to serve the union on a national level, remaining in his position until 1983. He was elected to the Senate to represent Lombardy in 1983 and served until 1987, as a member of Christian Democracy. Romei died in Rome on 5 December 2013.
