= Francesco Cimino =

Italian politician (1933–2025)

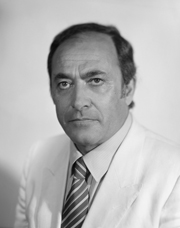

Member of the Senate of the Republic of Italy for Sicily
- In office 12 July 1983 – 22 April 1992

Personal details
- Born: 15 January 1933 Messina, Italy
- Died: 15 November 2025 (aged 92) Patti, Italy
- Party: Italian Socialist Party
- Occupation: Farmer

Francesco Cimino (15 January 1933 – 15 November 2025) was an Italian politician. A member of the Italian Socialist Party, he served in the Senate of the Republic from 1983 to 1992.

Cimino died in Patti on 15 November 2025, at the age of 92.
