= Anna Gabriella Ceccatelli =

Italian politician (1927–2001)

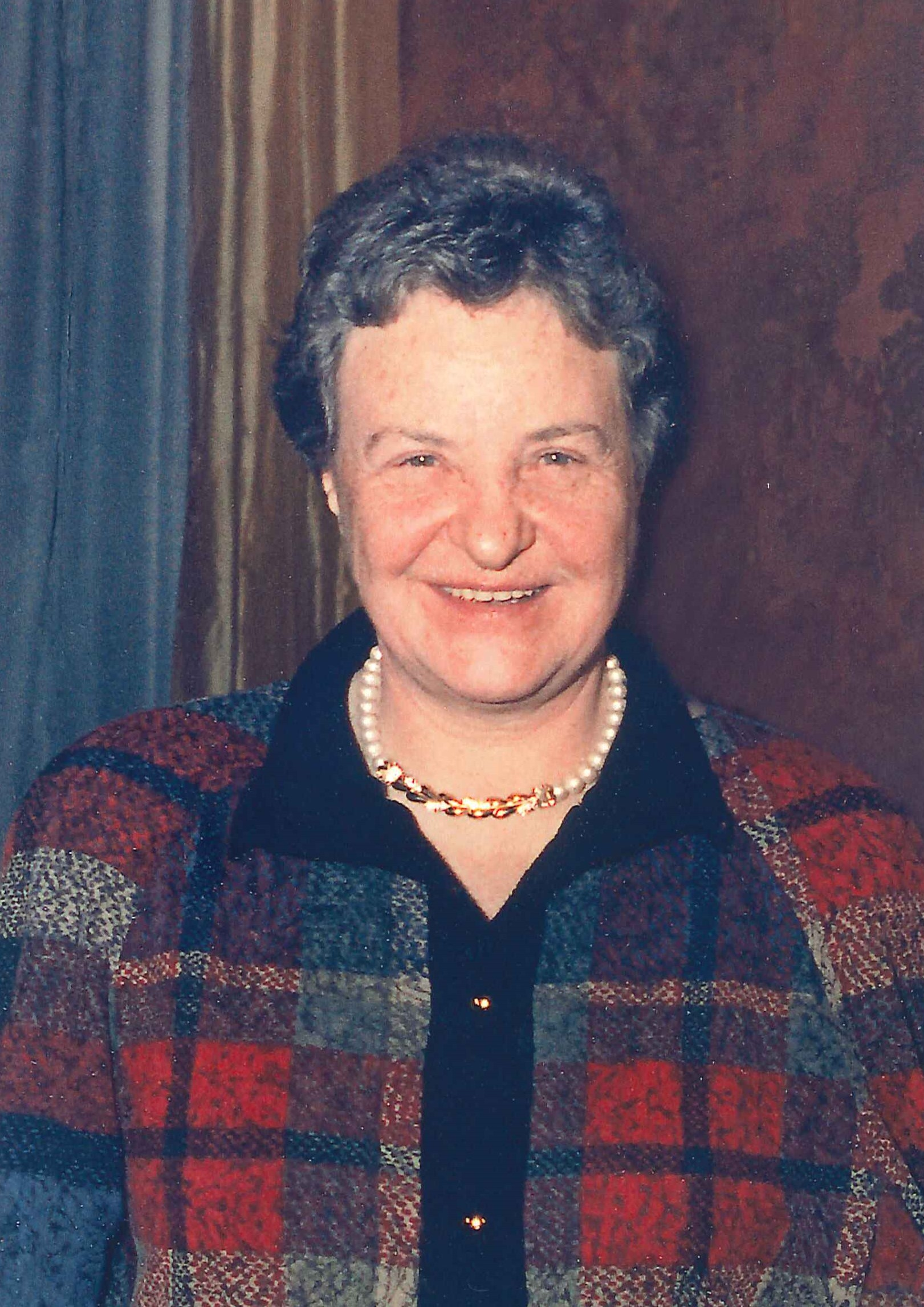

Senator of the Italian Republic
- In office 12 July 1983 – 1 July 1987
- Constituency: Piedmont
- In office 2 July 1987 – 22 April 1992
- Constituency: Lazio

Personal details
- Born: December 1, 1927 Prato, Tuscany, Italy
- Died: February 21, 2001 (aged 73) Rome, Italy
- Party: Christian Democracy
- Profession: Journalist

Anna Gabriella Ceccatelli, known as Gabriella (1 December 1927 – 21 February 2001), was an Italian politician.

== Biography ==
Ceccatelli was born in Prato, Tuscany on December 1, 1927.

Ceccatelli was also a Senator between 1983 and 1992 for the Christian Democracy party. During this period she was the undersecretary of the environmental ministry in the Giovanni Goria and De Mita governments from 1987 to 1989. She also had close ties to Catholic associations. She would serve as National Secretary of the Women's Movement of Christian Democracy.

She died in Rome on February 21, 2001.
