= Giorgio De Giuseppe =

Italian politician (born 1930)

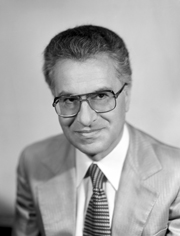

Member of the Senate
- In office 25 May 1972 – 14 April 1994

Personal details
- Born: 20 March 1930 (age 96) Maglie, Apulia, Italy
- Party: Christian Democracy
- Profession: Politician, advocate

Giorgio De Giuseppe (born 20 March 1930) is an Italian politician who served as Senator for six legislatures (1972–1994).
