= Pietro Fiocchi =

Italian Entrepreneur and politician (born 1964)

Pietro Fiocchi MEP
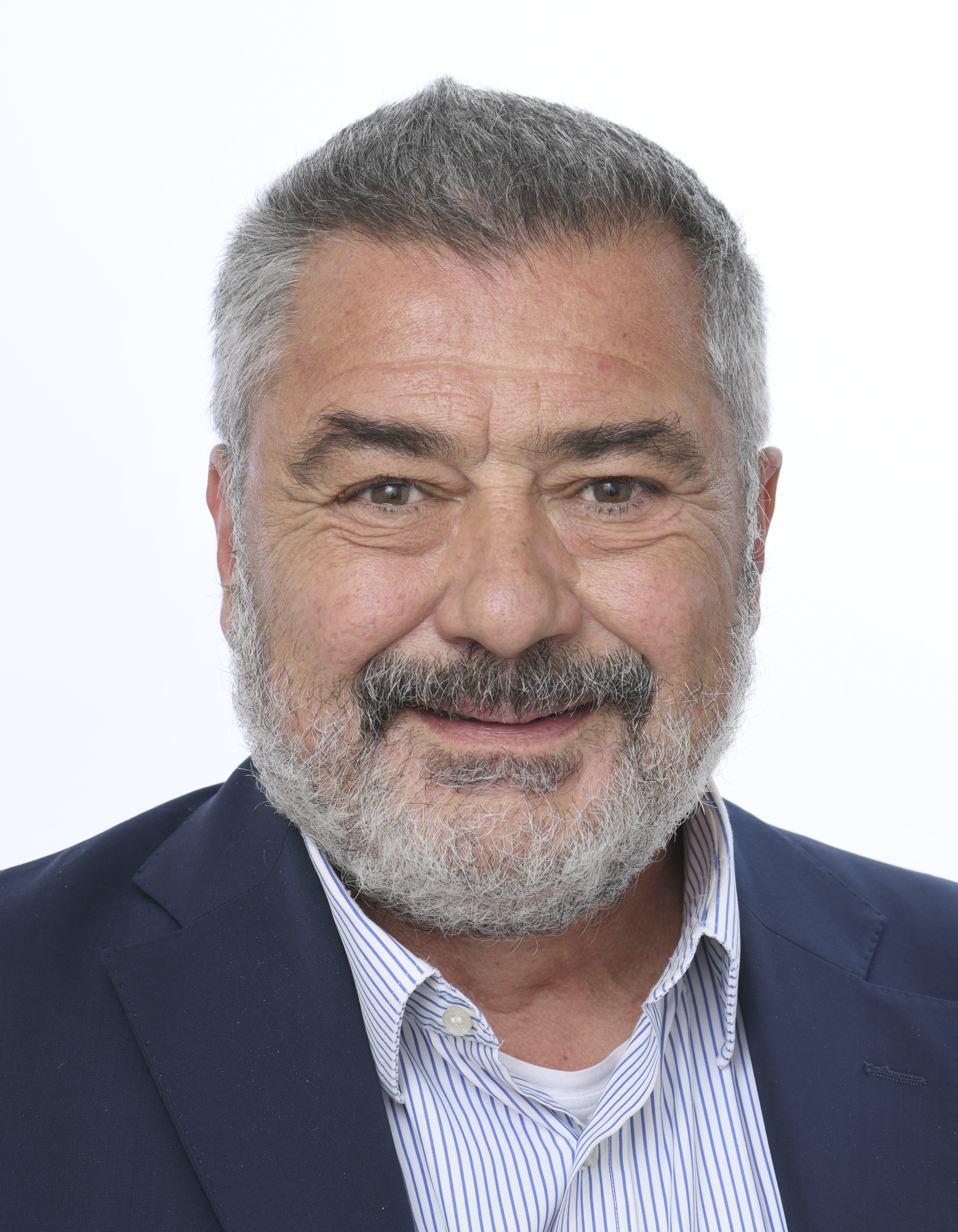

Member of the European Parliament for North-West Italy
- Incumbent
- Assumed office 2 July 2019

Personal details
- Born: 22 May 1964 (age 62) Milan, Italy
- Party: Brothers of Italy
- Children: 2
- Education: University of Missouri
- Profession: Entrepreneur

Pietro Fiocchi (born 22 May 1964) is an Italian Entrepreneur and politician. Born in Milan, after graduating in aerospace engineering at the University of Missouri of Rolla, he entered the Navy in 1990, serving as a Sub-lieutenant on the San Giorgio landing ship until 1992 and working with the San Marco Battalion and with the Comsubin, an Italian special forces department.

After two years in the navy he began his professional activity as technical director at Ravasi Robotics, an Italian robotics company, and later as manager and technical director at Fiocchi Munizioni. In 1998 he became president and member of the board of directors of Fiocchi of America. In 2007 he founded Fiocchi UK, while in 2015 he became a member of the Board of Directors of Target, a New Zealand company producing hunting and shooting cartridges.

In 2019 European Parliament election in Italy, he was elected as a member of the European Parliament on the Brothers of Italy list.
