= Gianfranco Aliverti =

Italian politician

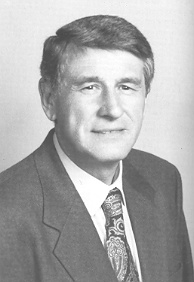

Member of the Senate
- In office 1983–1992

Personal details
- Born: 3 February 1930 (age 96) Como, Lombardy, Italy
- Party: Christian Democracy
- Profession: Politician

Gianfranco Aliverti (born 3 February 1930) is an Italian politician who served as Senator for two legislatures (1983–1992).
