= Alfredo Diana =

Italian politician (1930–2025)

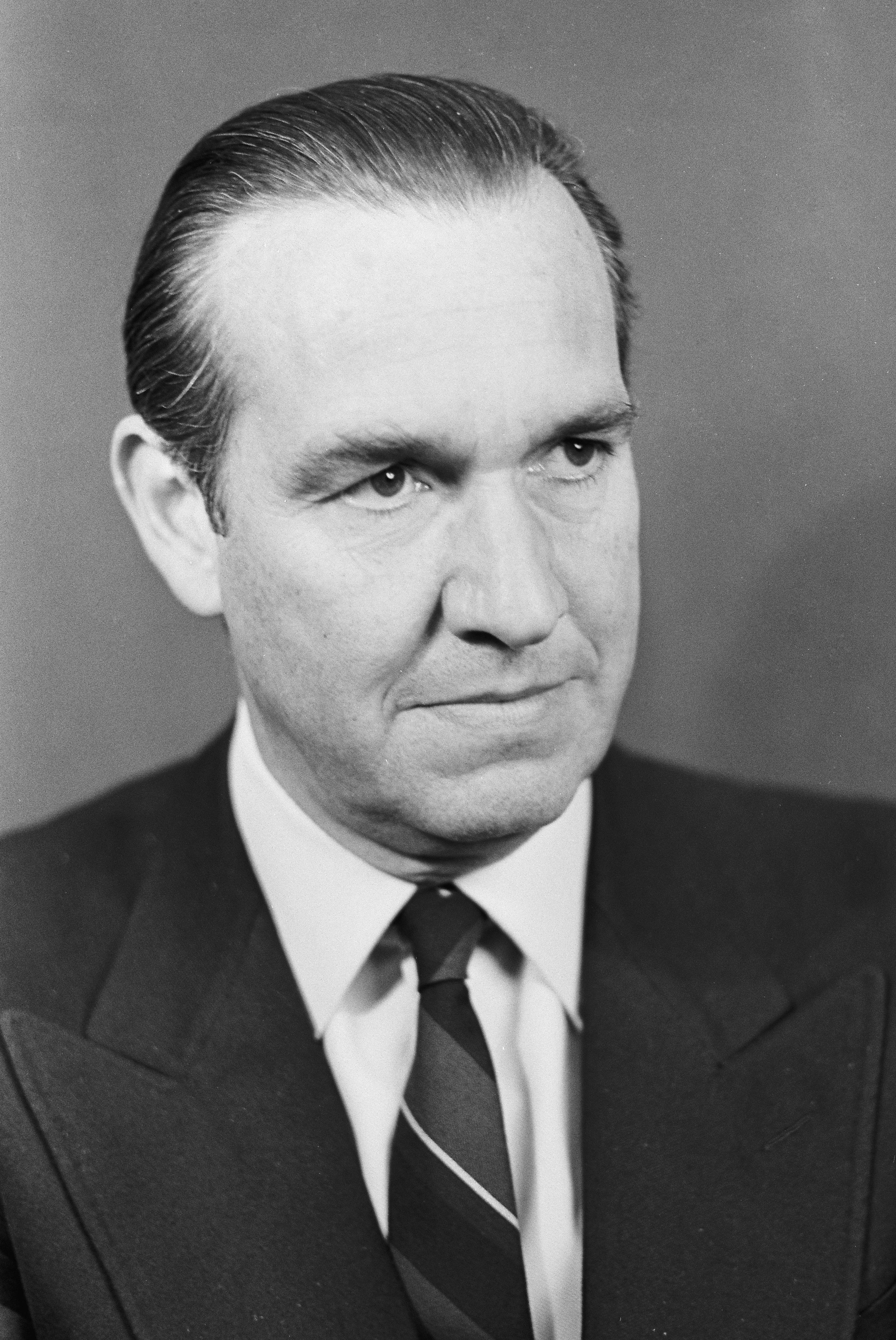

Minister of Agriculture and Forests
- In office 21 March 1993 – 10 May 1994
- Preceded by: Gianni Fontana
- Succeeded by: Adriana Poli Bortone

Member of the Senate of the Republic of Italy for Lombardy
- In office 12 July 1983 – 22 April 1992

Member of the European Parliament for North-West Italy
- In office 17 July 1979 – 23 July 1984

Personal details
- Born: Alfredo Luigi Diana; 2 June 1930 Rome, Italy
- Died: 12 August 2025 (aged 95) Naples, Italy
- Party: DC (until 1994); PPI (after 1994)
- Education: University of Naples Federico II
- Occupation: Farmer

Alfredo Luigi Diana (2 June 1930 – 12 August 2025) was an Italian politician. A member of Christian Democracy, he served as a member of the European Parliament from 1979 to 1984 and as a senator from 1983 to 1992. From 1993 to 1994, he was Minister of Agriculture and Forests.

Diana died in Naples on 12 August 2025, at the age of 95.
