= Giovanni Prandini =

Italian politician (1940–2018)

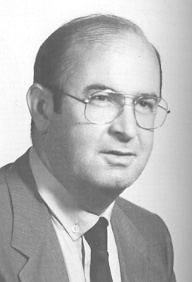

Minister of Public Works
- In office 22 July 1989 – 28 June 1992
- Prime Minister: Giulio Andreotti
- Preceded by: Enrico Ferri
- Succeeded by: Francesco Merloni

Minister of Merchant Navy
- In office 29 July 1987 – 22 July 1989
- Prime Minister: Giovanni Goria; Ciriaco De Mita
- Preceded by: Costante Degan
- Succeeded by: Carlo Vizzini
Parliamentary offices
Member of the Chamber of Deputies
In office 23 April 1992 – 14 April 1994
| Constituency | Brescia–Bergamo |
In office 25 May 1972 – 11 July 1983
| Constituency | Brescia–Bergamo |
Member of the Senate of the Republic
In office 12 July 1983 – 22 April 1992
| Constituency | Chiari |

Personal details
- Born: 22 January 1940 Calvisano, Kingdom of Italy
- Died: 11 March 2018 (aged 78) Brescia, Italy
- Party: Christian Democracy

Giovanni Prandini (22 January 1940 – 12 March 2018) was an Italian politician. A member of Christian Democracy, he served as minister of merchant navy between 1987 and 1989, and was minister of public works between 1989 and 1992. He was the first Italian politician who hold the post of the merchant navy minister.

== Biography ==
Prandini was born in Calvisano, Brescia, on 22 January 1940. He obtained a degree in economics and business. He worked as a civil servant and then as an insurance agent.

Prandini was first elected to the Italian Parliament in 1972 representing Christian Democrats, and served there until 1994. He also served as a senator in the IX and X legislatures. Between 1983 and 1986 Prandini was the undersecretary of the state ministry for foreign trade in the first cabinet of Prime Minister Bettino Craxi. He was the minister of merchant navy from 1987 to 1989 in the cabinet of Giovanni Goria and then in the cabinet of Ciriaco De Mita. Next he served as the minister of public works between 1989 and 1992 in the sixth and seventh cabinets of Giulio Andreotti.

Prandini was married and had two sons who are also politicians.

Prandini died in Brescia on 11 March 2018 following a long-term illness.

=== Controversy ===
Prandini was involved in the Tangentopoli investigations under clean hands operation. He was sentenced to 6 years and 4 months in prison for bribes on Anas contracts. He was freed from the charge by a verdict of not guilty due to the modifications in the related law. However, the process continued, and in February 2010 he was sentenced by the Court of Auditors to pay 5 million Euros for the abuse of power during his term as minister of public works.

== Electoral history ==
| Election | House | Constituency | Party | Votes | Result | Notes |
|---|---|---|---|---|---|---|
| 1972 | Chamber of Deputies | Brescia–Bergamo | DC | 38,580 | Elected | |
| 1976 | Chamber of Deputies | Brescia–Bergamo | DC | 45,782 | Elected | |
| 1979 | Chamber of Deputies | Brescia–Bergamo | DC | 41,837 | Elected | |
| 1983 | Senate of the Republic | Lombardy – Chiari | DC | 55,470 | Elected | |
| 1987 | Senate of the Republic | Lombardy – Chiari | DC | 57,888 | Elected | |
| 1992 | Chamber of Deputies | Brescia–Bergamo | DC | 46,843 | Elected | |
