= Elio Fontana =

Italian politician (1941–2024)

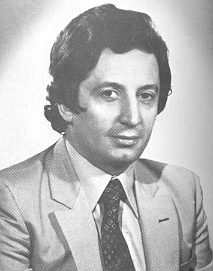
- Fontana in 1980

Member of the Senate of the Republic of Italy
- In office 12 July 1983 – 14 April 1994

Member of the Chamber of Deputies of Italy
- In office 15 June 1979 – 11 July 1983

Personal details
- Born: Elio Marcheno Fontana; 30 March 1941 Marcheno, Italy
- Died: 5 September 2024 (aged 83) Brescia, Italy
- Party: DC

Elio Marcheno Fontana (30 March 1941 – 5 September 2024) was an Italian politician. A member of Christian Democracy, he served in the Chamber of Deputies from 1979 to 1983 and in the Senate of the Republic from 1983 to 1994.

Fontana died in Brescia on 5 September 2024, at the age of 83.
