= Maurizio Lotti =

Italian politician (1940–2014)

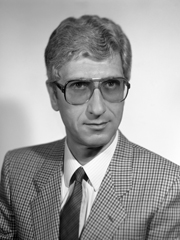

Senator of the Italian Republic
- In office 12 July 1983 – 22 April 1992
- Constituency: Lombardy

Personal details
- Born: May 12, 1940 Poggio Rusco, Italy
- Died: December 22, 2014 (aged 74) Pieve di Coriano, Italy
- Party: Italian Communist Party
- Children: 2

Maurizio Lotti (12 May 1940 – 22 December 2014) was an Italian politician, born in Poggio Rusco. He was a lawyer for a few years before his first political bid, when he was elected mayor of his hometown in coalition with the Italian Communist Party. In 1975, he was appointed President of the Province of Mantua. After two terms, he was a Senator of the Italian Republic for two terms, from 1983 to 1992.
