= Luigi Granelli =

Italian politician (1929–1999)

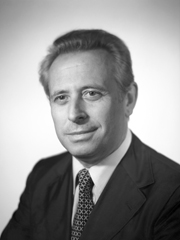

Minister for State Holdings
- In office August 1987 – April 1988
- Prime Minister: Giovanni Goria

Minister for Scientific and Technological Research
- In office July 1983 – July 1987
- Prime Minister: Bettino Craxi; Amintore Fanfani

Personal details
- Born: 1 March 1929 Lovere, Kingdom of Italy
- Died: 1 December 1999 (aged 70)
- Party: Christian Democracy (1945–1994); People's Party (1994–1999)
- Spouse: Adriana Granelli
- Children: 1

Luigi Granelli (March 1, 1929 – December 1, 1999) was an Italian politician who served in different government posts. He was a member of the Christian Democracy (DC) between 1945 and 1994 and one of the "third generation" leaders of the Christian Democrats. Granelli joined People's Party (PPI) in 1994.

== Early life and education ==
Granelli was born in Lovere in the province of Bergamo on 1 March 1929. He obtained a professional school diploma.

== Career ==
Following graduation Granelli worked as a skilled worker until 1952. In 1945 his political career began when he joined the DC and in 1957 he became a member of its central committee which he held until 1991. In the late 1950s Granelli was one of the leaders of the faction called La Base (Italian: Sinistra di Base) in the DC which was the most leftist group in the party. In the 12th Congress of the DC in 1973 the members of this faction comprised 10.8% of the DC members.

Granelli was elected city councilor in Milan in 1965. He became a member of Parliament in 1968 and was re-elected in 1972 and 1976. He served as the undersecretary for foreign affairs from 1973 to 1976. He was the member of the European Parliament from October 1976 to June 1979. As of 1977 he was director of external relations office of the DC.

In July 1983 Granelli was appointed minister for scientific and technological research which he held until July 1987 in three successive cabinets which were led by Prime Minister Bettino Craxi for two times and by Prime Minister Amintore Fanfani. Then he served as the minister for state holdings from August 1987 to April 1988 in the cabinet led by Prime Minister Giovanni Goria. Granelli was elected to the Italian Senate in 1979 and was the vice president of the Senate from 30 April 1992 to 15 April 1994. He left the DC in 1994 when it was dissolved and joined the PPI the same year when it was established.

=== Other activities and views ===
From 1960 to 1967 he was president of the National Institute for the Training and Improvement of Industrial Workers, a national body aimed at training the industrial workers. He was a board member and president of the Lombardy Institute of Economic and Social Studies which was renamed as Lombardy Regional Research Institute in 1974.

Granelli contributed to many magazines and newspapers and was the director of a bimonthly political magazine entitled Stato democratico which he founded in 1953 and a monthly political and cultural magazine entitled Il Domani d'Italy.

Granelli was one of the leading politicians who did not support Italy's participation in NATO and argued that Italy should follow a neutral policy. This group also included other DC politicians such as Giorgio La Pira and Amintore Fanfani.

== Personal life and death ==
He married Adriana Granelli in 1953. They had a son who was born in 1960. He died on 1 December 1999 at the age of 70.
