= Republicanism =

Political ideology centered on citizenship in a state organized as a republic

Republicanism is a political ideology that promotes the republican system of government, in which sovereignty resides in the people and their elected representatives, as opposed to hereditary monarchy or other forms of absolute personal power. It is founded on several key principles, including civic virtue, active political participation, civic education, the fight against corruption (anti-corruption), a preference for a balanced and mixed constitution, government limited by constitutional laws, freedom as non-domination, and a commitment to the rule of law and the common good. Historically, it emphasizes the idea of self-governance and ranges from the rule of a representative minority or aristocracy to popular sovereignty. It has had different definitions and interpretations which vary significantly based on historical context and methodological approach. In countries ruled by a monarch or similar ruler, or with a monarch whose role is primarily ceremonial such as the United Kingdom, "republicanism" is simply the wish to replace the hereditary monarchy by some form of elected republic.

Republicanism may also refer to the non-ideological scientific approach to politics and governance. As the republican thinker and second president of the United States John Adams stated in the introduction to his famous A Defense of the Constitutions of Government of the United States of America, the "science of politics is the science of social happiness" and a republic is the form of government arrived at when the science of politics is appropriately applied to the creation of a rationally designed government.

Rather than being ideological, this approach focuses on applying a scientific methodology to the problems of governance through the rigorous study and application of past experience and experimentation in governance. This is the approach that may best be described to apply to republican thinkers such as Niccolò Machiavelli (as evident in his Discourses on Livy), John Adams, and James Madison.

The word "republic" derives from the Latin noun-phrase res publica (public thing), which referred to the system of government that emerged in the 6th century BCE following the expulsion of the kings from Rome by Lucius Junius Brutus and Collatinus.

This form of government in the Roman state collapsed in the latter part of the 1st century BCE, giving way to what was a monarchy in form, if not in name. Republics recurred subsequently, with, for example, Renaissance Florence or early modern Britain. The concept of a republic became a powerful force in Britain's North American colonies, where it contributed to the American Revolution. In Europe, it gained enormous influence through the French Revolution and the First French Republic of 1792–1804. Within left-wing political theory, republicanism had an influence on Karl Marx, and strains of it could be found in the governance of Marxist-Leninist states such as the Soviet Union.

== Historical development ==
=== Classical antecedents ===
==== Ancient Greece ====
Sculpture of Aristotle

In Ancient Greece, several philosophers and historians analysed and described elements we now recognize as classical republicanism. Traditionally, the Greek concept of "politeia" was rendered into Latin as res publica. Consequently, political theory until relatively recently often used republic in the general sense of "regime". There is no single written expression or definition from this era that exactly corresponds with a modern understanding of the term "republic" but most of the essential features of the modern definition are present in the works of Plato, Aristotle and Polybius. These include theories of mixed government and of civic virtue. For example, in The Republic, Plato places great emphasis on the importance of civic virtue (aiming for the good) together with personal virtue ('just man') on the part of the ideal rulers. Indeed, in Book V, Plato asserts that until rulers have the nature of philosophers (Socrates) or philosophers become the rulers, there can be no civic peace or happiness.

A number of Ancient Greek city-states such as Athens and Sparta have been classified as "classical republics", because they featured extensive participation by the citizens in legislation and political decision-making. Aristotle considered Carthage to have been a republic as it had a political system similar to that of some of the Greek cities, notably Sparta, but avoided some of the defects that affected them.

==== Ancient Rome ====
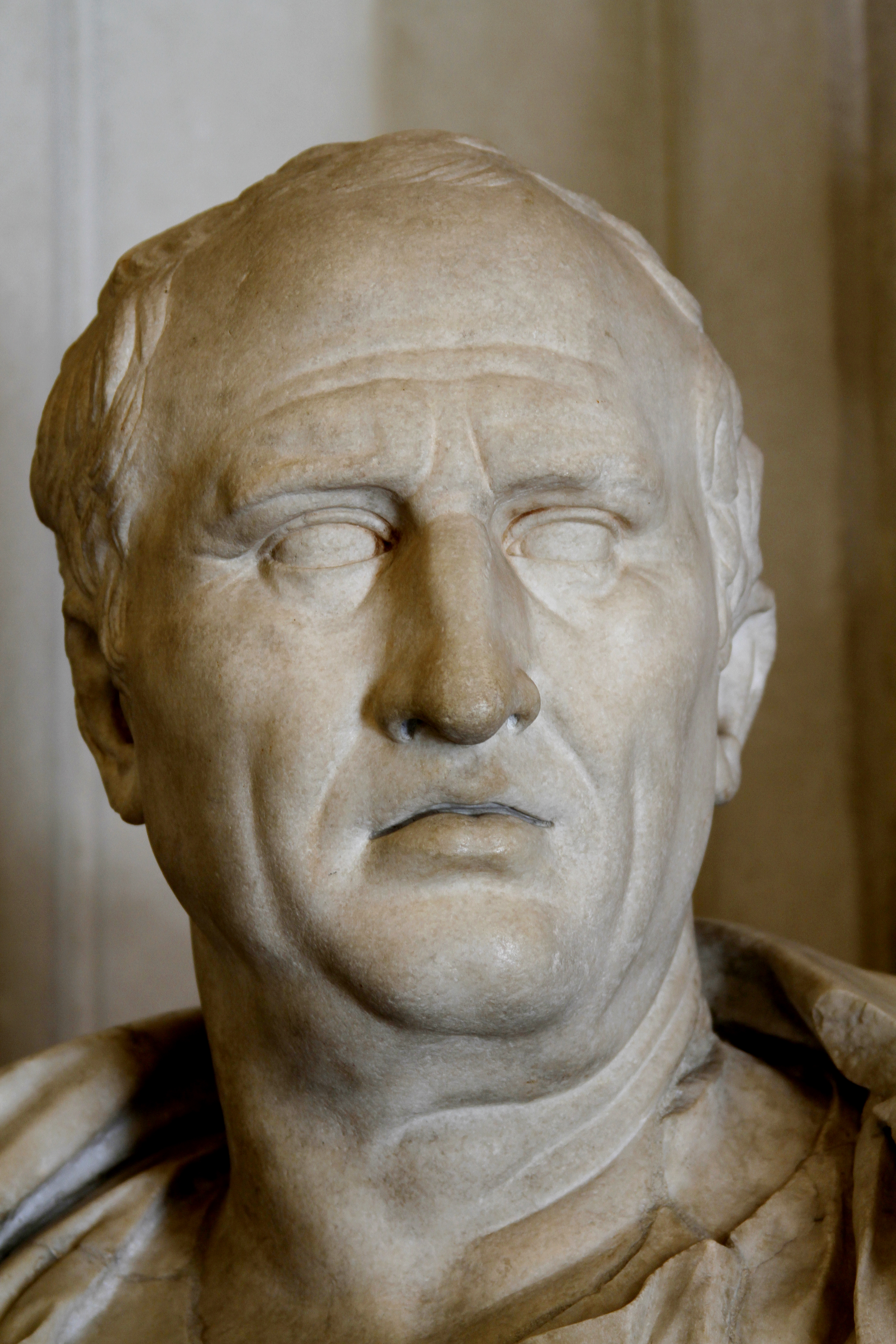
Sculpture of Cicero

Both Livy, a Roman historian, and Plutarch, who is noted for his biographies and moral essays, described how Rome had developed its legislation, notably the transition from a kingdom to a republic, by following the example of the Greeks. Some of this history, composed more than 500 years after the events, with scant written sources to rely on, may be fictitious reconstruction.

The Greek historian Polybius, writing in the mid-2nd century BCE, emphasized (in Book 6) the role played by the Roman Republic as an institutional form in the dramatic rise of Rome's hegemony over the Mediterranean. In his writing on the constitution of the Roman Republic, Polybius described the system as being a "mixed" form of government. Specifically, Polybius described the Roman system as a mixture of monarchy, aristocracy, and democracy with the Roman Republic constituted in such a manner that it applied the strengths of each system to offset the weaknesses of the others. In his view, the mixed system of the Roman Republic provided the Romans with a much greater level of domestic tranquillity than would have been experienced under another form of government. Furthermore, Polybius argued, the comparative level of domestic tranquillity the Romans enjoyed allowed them to conquer the Mediterranean. Polybius exerted a great influence on Cicero as he wrote his politico-philosophical works in the 1st century BCE. In one of these works, De re publica, Cicero linked the Roman concept of res publica to the Greek politeia.

The modern term "republic", despite its derivation, is not synonymous with the Roman res publica. Among the several meanings of the term res publica, it is most often translated "republic" where the Latin expression refers to the Roman state, and its form of government, between the era of the Kings and the era of the Emperors. This Roman Republic would, by a modern understanding of the word, still be defined as a true republic, even if not coinciding entirely. Thus, Enlightenment philosophers saw the Roman Republic as an ideal system because it included features like a systematic separation of powers.

Romans still called their state "Res Publica" in the era of the early emperors because, on the surface, the organization of the state had been preserved by the first emperors without significant alteration. Several offices from the Republican era, held by individuals, were combined under the control of a single person. These changes became permanent, and gradually conferred sovereignty on the Emperor.

Cicero's description of the ideal state, in De re Publica, does not equate to a modern-day "republic"; it is more like enlightened absolutism. His philosophical works were influential when Enlightenment philosophers such as Voltaire developed their political concepts.

In its classical meaning, a republic was any stable well-governed political community. Both Plato and Aristotle identified three forms of government: democracy, aristocracy, and monarchy. First Plato and Aristotle, and then Polybius and Cicero, held that the ideal republic is a mixture of these three forms of government. The writers of the Renaissance embraced this notion.

Cicero expressed reservations concerning the republican form of government. While in his theoretical works he defended monarchy, or at least a mixed monarchy/oligarchy, in his own political life, he generally opposed men, like Julius Caesar, Mark Antony, and Octavian, who were trying to realise such ideals. Eventually, that opposition led to his death and Cicero can be seen as a victim of his own Republican ideals.

Tacitus, a contemporary of Plutarch, was not concerned with whether a form of government could be analysed as a "republic" or a "monarchy". He analysed how the powers accumulated by the early Julio-Claudian dynasty were all given by a State that was still notionally a republic. Nor was the Roman Republic "forced" to give away these powers: it did so freely and reasonably, certainly in Augustus' case, because of his many services to the state, freeing it from civil wars and disorder.

Tacitus was one of the first to ask whether such powers were given to the head of state because the citizens wanted to give them, or whether they were given for other reasons (for example, because one had a deified ancestor). The latter case led more easily to abuses of power. In Tacitus' opinion, the trend away from a true republic was irreversible only when Tiberius established power, shortly after Augustus' death in 14 CE (much later than most historians place the start of the Imperial form of government in Rome). By this time, too many principles defining some powers as "untouchable" had been implemented.

=== Renaissance republicanism ===
Portrait of Niccolò Machiavelli

In Europe, republicanism was revived in the late Middle Ages when a number of states, which arose from medieval communes, embraced a republican system of government. These were generally small but wealthy trading states in which the merchant class had risen to prominence. Haakonssen notes that by the Renaissance, Europe was divided, such that those states controlled by a landed elite were monarchies, and those controlled by a commercial elite were republics. The latter included the Italian city-states of Florence, Genoa, and Venice and members of the Hanseatic League. One notable exception was Dithmarschen, a group of largely autonomous villages, which confederated in a peasants' republic. Building upon concepts of medieval feudalism, Renaissance scholars used the ideas of the ancient world to advance their view of an ideal government. Thus the republicanism developed during the Renaissance is known as 'classical republicanism' because it relied on classical models. This terminology was developed by Zera Fink in the 1940s, but some modern scholars, such as Brugger, consider it confuses the "classical republic" with the system of government used in the ancient world. 'Early modern republicanism' has been proposed as an alternative term. It is also sometimes called civic humanism. Beyond simply a non-monarchy, early modern thinkers conceived of an ideal republic, in which mixed government was an important element, and the notion that virtue and the common good were central to good government. Republicanism also developed its own distinct view of liberty. Renaissance authors who spoke highly of republics were rarely critical of monarchies. While Niccolò Machiavelli's Discourses on Livy is the period's key work on republics, he also wrote the treatise The Prince, which is better remembered and more widely read, on how best to run a monarchy. The early modern writers did not see the republican model as universally applicable; most thought that it could be successful only in very small and highly urbanized city-states. Jean Bodin in Six Books of the Commonwealth (1576) identified monarchy with republic.

Classical writers like Tacitus tried to avoid an outspoken preference for one government system or another. Enlightenment philosophers, on the other hand, expressed a clear opinion. Thomas More, writing before the Age of Enlightenment, was too outspoken for the reigning king's taste, even though he coded his political preferences in a utopian allegory.

In England a type of republicanism evolved that was not wholly opposed to monarchy; thinkers such as Thomas More, John Fisher and Sir Thomas Smith saw a monarchy, firmly constrained by law, as compatible with republicanism.

==== Dutch Republic ====
Anti-monarchism became more strident in the Dutch Republic during and after the Eighty Years' War, which began in 1568. This anti-monarchism was more propaganda than a political philosophy; most of the anti-monarchist works appeared in the form of widely distributed pamphlets. This evolved into a systematic critique of monarchy, written by men such as the brothers Johan and Peter de la Court. They saw all monarchies as illegitimate tyrannies that were inherently corrupt. These authors were more concerned with preventing the position of Stadholder from evolving into a monarchy, than with attacking their former rulers. Dutch republicanism also influenced French Huguenots during the Wars of Religion. In the other states of early modern Europe republicanism was more moderate.

==== Polish–Lithuanian Commonwealth ====
In the Polish–Lithuanian Commonwealth, republicanism was the influential ideology. After the establishment of the Commonwealth of Two Nations, republicans supported the status quo, of having a very weak monarch, and opposed those who thought a stronger monarchy was needed. These mostly Polish republicans, such as Łukasz Górnicki, Andrzej Wolan, and Stanisław Konarski, were well read in classical and Renaissance texts and firmly believed that their state was a republic on the Roman model, and started to call their state the Rzeczpospolita. Atypically, Polish–Lithuanian republicanism was not the ideology of the commercial class, but rather of the landed nobility, which would lose power if the monarchy were expanded. This resulted in an oligarchy of the great landed magnates.

=== Enlightenment republicanism ===
==== Caribbean ====
Victor Hugues, Jean-Baptiste Raymond de Lacrosse and Nicolas Xavier de Ricard were prominent supporters of republicanism for various Caribbean islands. Edwin Sandys, William Sayle and George Tucker all supported the islands becoming republics, particularly Bermuda. Julien Fédon and Joachim Philip led the republican Fédon's rebellion between 2 March 1795 and 19 June 1796, an uprising against British rule in Grenada.

==== Corsica ====
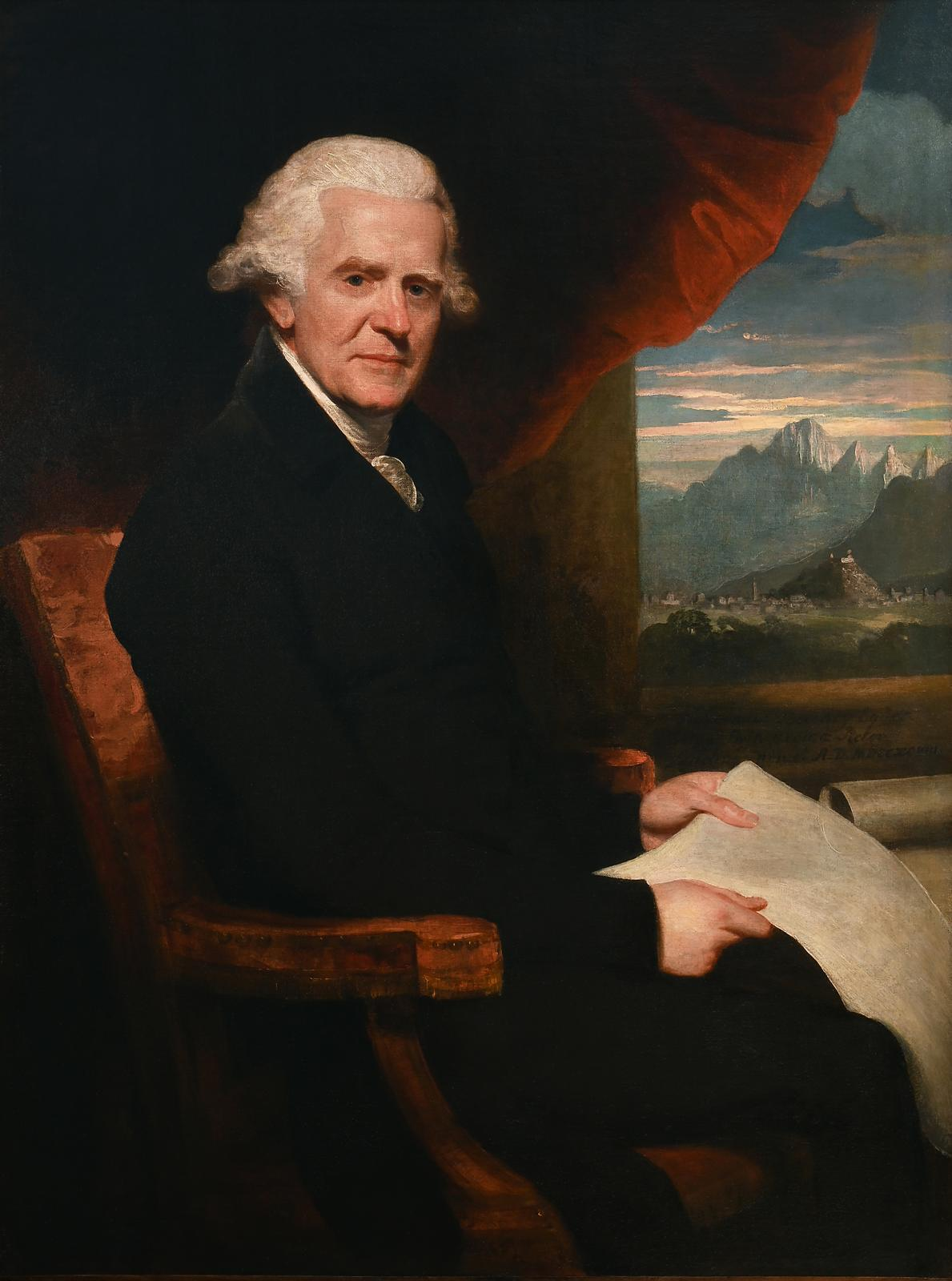
Portrait of Pasquale Paoli

The first of the Enlightenment republics established in Europe during the 18th century occurred in the small Mediterranean island of Corsica. Although perhaps an unlikely place to act as a laboratory for such political experiments, Corsica combined a number of factors that made it unique: a tradition of village democracy; varied cultural influences from the Italian city-states, Spanish Empire and Kingdom of France which left it open to the ideas of the Italian Renaissance, Spanish humanism and French Enlightenment; and a geo-political position between these three competing powers which led to frequent power vacuums in which new regimes could be set up, testing out the fashionable new ideas of the age.

From the 1720s the island had been experiencing a series of short-lived but ongoing rebellions against its current sovereign, the Italian city-state of Genoa. During the initial period (1729–36) these merely sought to restore the control of the Spanish Empire; when this proved impossible, an independent Kingdom of Corsica (1736–40) was proclaimed, following the Enlightenment ideal of a written constitutional monarchy. But the perception grew that the monarchy had colluded with the invading power, a more radical group of reformers led by the Pasquale Paoli pushed for political overhaul, in the form of a constitutional and parliamentary republic inspired by the popular ideas of the Enlightenment.

Its governing philosophy was both inspired by the prominent thinkers of the day, notably the French philosophers Montesquieu and Voltaire and the Swiss theorist Jean-Jacques Rousseau. Not only did it include a permanent national parliament with fixed-term legislatures and regular elections, but, more radically for the time, it introduced universal male suffrage, and it is thought to be the first constitution in the world to grant women the right to vote, female suffrage did exist for heads of the family. It also extended Enlightened principles to other spheres, including administrative reform, the foundation of a national university at Corte, and the establishment of a popular standing army.

The Corsican Republic lasted for fifteen years, from 1755 to 1769, eventually falling to a combination of Genoese and French forces and was incorporated as a province of the Kingdom of France. But the episode resonated across Europe as an early example of Enlightened constitutional republicanism, with many of the most prominent political commentators of the day recognising it to be an experiment in a new type of popular and democratic government. Its influence was particularly notable among the French Enlightenment philosophers: Rousseau's famous work On the Social Contract (1762: chapter 10, book II) declared, in its discussion on the conditions necessary for a functional popular sovereignty, that "There is still one European country capable of making its own laws: the island of Corsica. valour and persistency with which that brave people has regained and defended its liberty well deserves that some wise man should teach it how to preserve what it has won. I have a feeling that some day that little island will astonish Europe."; indeed Rousseau volunteered to do precisely that, offering a draft constitution for Paoli'se use. Similarly, Voltaire affirmed in his Précis du siècle de Louis XV (1769: chapter LX) that "Bravery may be found in many places, but such bravery only among free peoples". But the influence of the Corsican Republic as an example of a sovereign people fighting for liberty and enshrining this constitutionally in the form of an Enlightened republic was even greater among the Radicals of Great Britain and North America, where it was popularised via An Account of Corsica, by the Scottish essayist James Boswell. The Corsican Republic went on to influence the American revolutionaries ten years later: the Sons of Liberty, initiators of the American Revolution, would declare Pascal Paoli to be a direct inspiration for their own struggle against the British; the son of Ebenezer Mackintosh was named Pascal Paoli Mackintosh in his honour, and no fewer than five American counties are named Paoli for the same reason.

==== England ====
Portrait of Oliver Cromwell

Oliver Cromwell set up a Christian republic called the Commonwealth of England (1649–1660) which he ruled after the overthrow of King Charles I. James Harrington was then a leading philosopher of republicanism. John Milton was another important Republican thinker at this time, expressing his views in political tracts as well as through poetry and prose. In his epic poem Paradise Lost, for instance, Milton uses Satan's fall to suggest that unfit monarchs should be brought to justice, and that such issues extend beyond the constraints of one nation. As Christopher N. Warren argues, Milton offers "a language to critique imperialism, to question the legitimacy of dictators, to defend free international discourse, to fight unjust property relations, and to forge new political bonds across national lines." This form of international Miltonic republicanism has been influential on later thinkers including 19th-century radicals Karl Marx and Friedrich Engels, according to Warren and other historians.

The collapse of the Commonwealth of England in 1660 and the restoration of the monarchy under Charles II discredited republicanism among England's ruling circles. Nevertheless, they welcomed the liberalism, and emphasis on rights, of John Locke, which played a major role in the Glorious Revolution of 1688. Even so, republicanism flourished in the "country" party of the early 18th century (commonwealthmen), which denounced the corruption of the "court" party, producing a political theory that heavily influenced the American colonists. In general, the English ruling classes of the 18th century vehemently opposed republicanism, typified by the attacks on John Wilkes, and especially on the American Revolution and the French Revolution.

==== French and Swiss thought ====
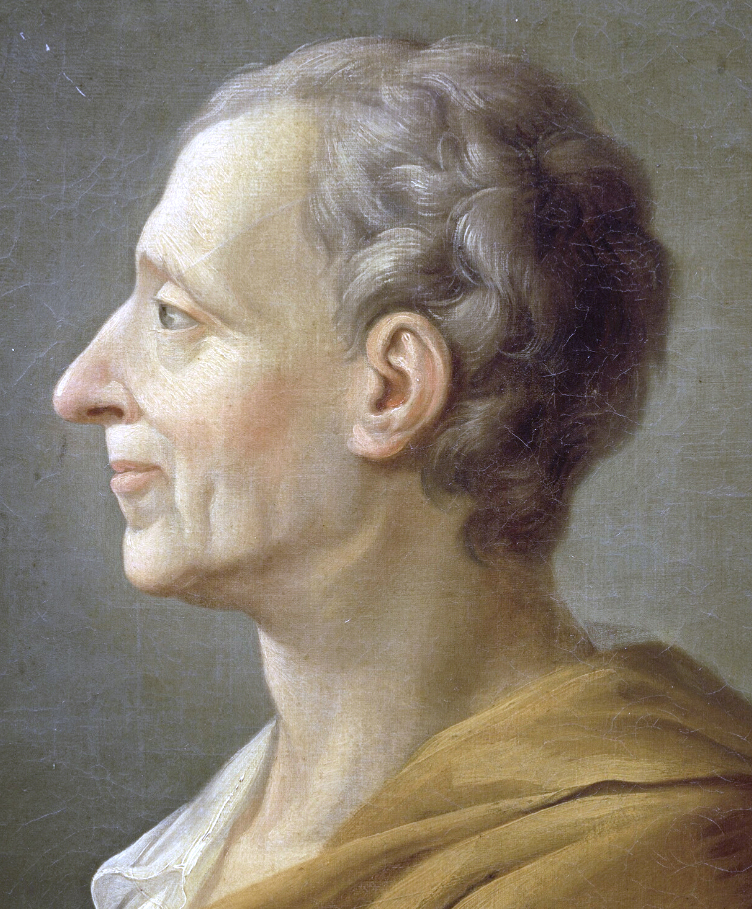
Portrait of Montesquieu

French and Swiss Enlightenment thinkers, such as Voltaire, Baron Charles de Montesquieu and later Jean-Jacques Rousseau, expanded upon and altered the ideas of what an ideal republic should be: some of their new ideas were scarcely traceable to antiquity or the Renaissance thinkers. Concepts they contributed, or heavily elaborated, were social contract, positive law, and mixed government. They also borrowed from, and distinguished republicanism from, the ideas of liberalism that were developing at the same time.

Liberalism and republicanism were frequently conflated during this period, because they both opposed absolute monarchy. Modern scholars see them as two distinct streams that both contributed to the democratic ideals of the modern world. An important distinction is that, while republicanism stressed the importance of civic virtue and the common good, liberalism was based on economics and individualism. It is clearest in the matter of private property, which, according to some, can be maintained only under the protection of established positive law.

Jules Ferry, Prime Minister of France from 1880 to 1885, followed both these schools of thought. He eventually enacted the Ferry Laws, which he intended to overturn the Falloux Laws by embracing the anti-clerical thinking of the Philosophes. These laws ended the Catholic Church's involvement in many government institutions in late 19th-century France, including schools.

==== Thirteen British Colonies in North America ====
In recent years a debate has developed over the role of republicanism in the American Revolution and in the British radicalism of the 18th century. For many decades the consensus was that liberalism, especially that of John Locke, was paramount and that republicanism had a distinctly secondary role.

The new interpretations were pioneered by J.G.A. Pocock, who argued in The Machiavellian Moment (1975) that, at least in the early 18th century, republican ideas were just as important as liberal ones. Pocock's view is now widely accepted. Bernard Bailyn and Gordon Wood pioneered the argument that the American founding fathers were more influenced by republicanism than they were by liberalism. Cornell University professor Isaac Kramnick, on the other hand, argues that Americans have always been highly individualistic and therefore Lockean. Joyce Appleby has argued similarly for the Lockean influence on America.

In the decades before the American Revolution (1776), the intellectual and political leaders of the colonies studied history intently, looking for models of good government. They especially followed the development of republican ideas in England. Pocock explained the intellectual sources in America:

The Whig canon and the neo-Harringtonians, John Milton, James Harrington and Sidney, Trenchard, Gordon and Bolingbroke, together with the Greek, Roman, and Renaissance masters of the tradition as far as Montesquieu, formed the authoritative literature of this culture; and its values and concepts were those with which we have grown familiar: a civic and patriot ideal in which the personality was founded in property, perfected in citizenship but perpetually threatened by corruption; government figuring paradoxically as the principal source of corruption and operating through such means as patronage, faction, standing armies (opposed to the ideal of the militia), established churches (opposed to the Puritan and deist modes of American religion) and the promotion of a monied interest – though the formulation of this last concept was somewhat hindered by the keen desire for readily available paper credit common in colonies of settlement. A neoclassical politics provided both the ethos of the elites and the rhetoric of the upwardly mobile, and accounts for the singular cultural and intellectual homogeneity of the Founding Fathers and their generation.

The commitment of most Americans to these republican values made the American Revolution inevitable. Britain was increasingly seen as corrupt and hostile to republicanism, and as a threat to the established liberties the Americans enjoyed.

Leopold von Ranke in 1848 claimed that American republicanism played a crucial role in the development of European liberalism:

By abandoning English constitutionalism and creating a new republic based on the rights of the individual, the North Americans introduced a new force in the world. Ideas spread most rapidly when they have found adequate concrete expression. Thus republicanism entered our Romanic/Germanic world.... Up to this point, the conviction had prevailed in Europe that monarchy best served the interests of the nation. Now the idea spread that the nation should govern itself. But only after a state had actually been formed on the basis of the theory of representation did the full significance of this idea become clear. All later revolutionary movements have this same goal... This was the complete reversal of a principle. Until then, a king who ruled by the grace of God had been the center around which everything turned. Now the idea emerged that power should come from below.... These two principles are like two opposite poles, and it is the conflict between them that determines the course of the modern world. In Europe the conflict between them had not yet taken on concrete form; with the French Revolution it did.

==== Républicanisme ====
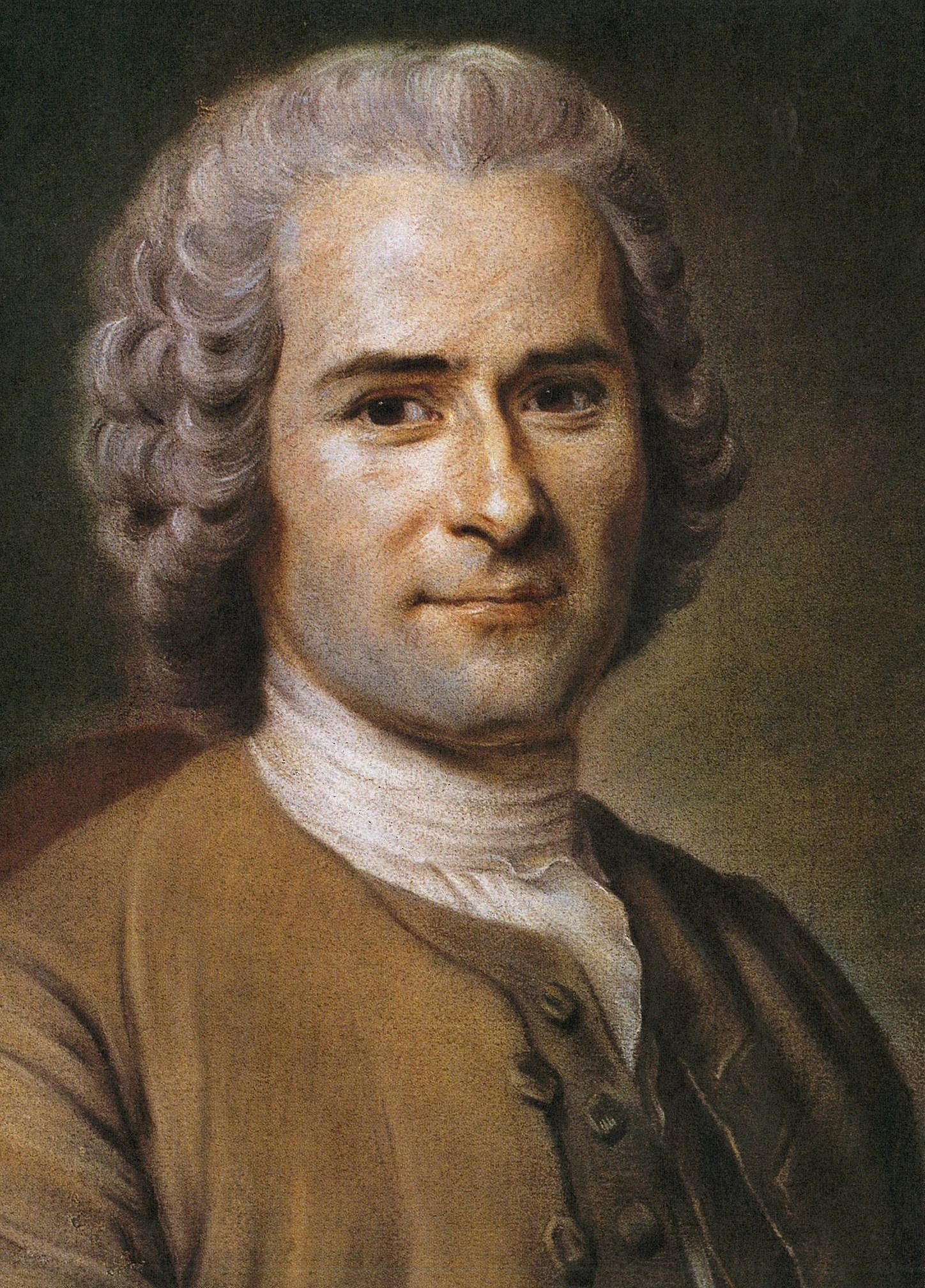
Portrait of Jean-Jacques Rousseau

Republicanism, especially that of Rousseau, played a central role in the French Revolution and foreshadowed modern republicanism. The revolutionaries, after overthrowing the French monarchy in the 1790s, began by setting up a republic; Napoleon converted it into an Empire with a new aristocracy. In the 1830s Belgium adopted some of the innovations of the progressive political philosophers of the Enlightenment.

Républicanisme is a French version of modern republicanism. It is a form of social contract, deduced from Jean-Jacques Rousseau's idea of a general will. Each citizen is engaged in a direct relationship with the state, removing the need for identity politics based on local, religious, or racial identification.

Républicanisme, in theory, makes anti-discrimination laws unnecessary, though some critics may argue that in republics also, colour-blind laws serve to perpetuate discrimination.

==== Ireland ====
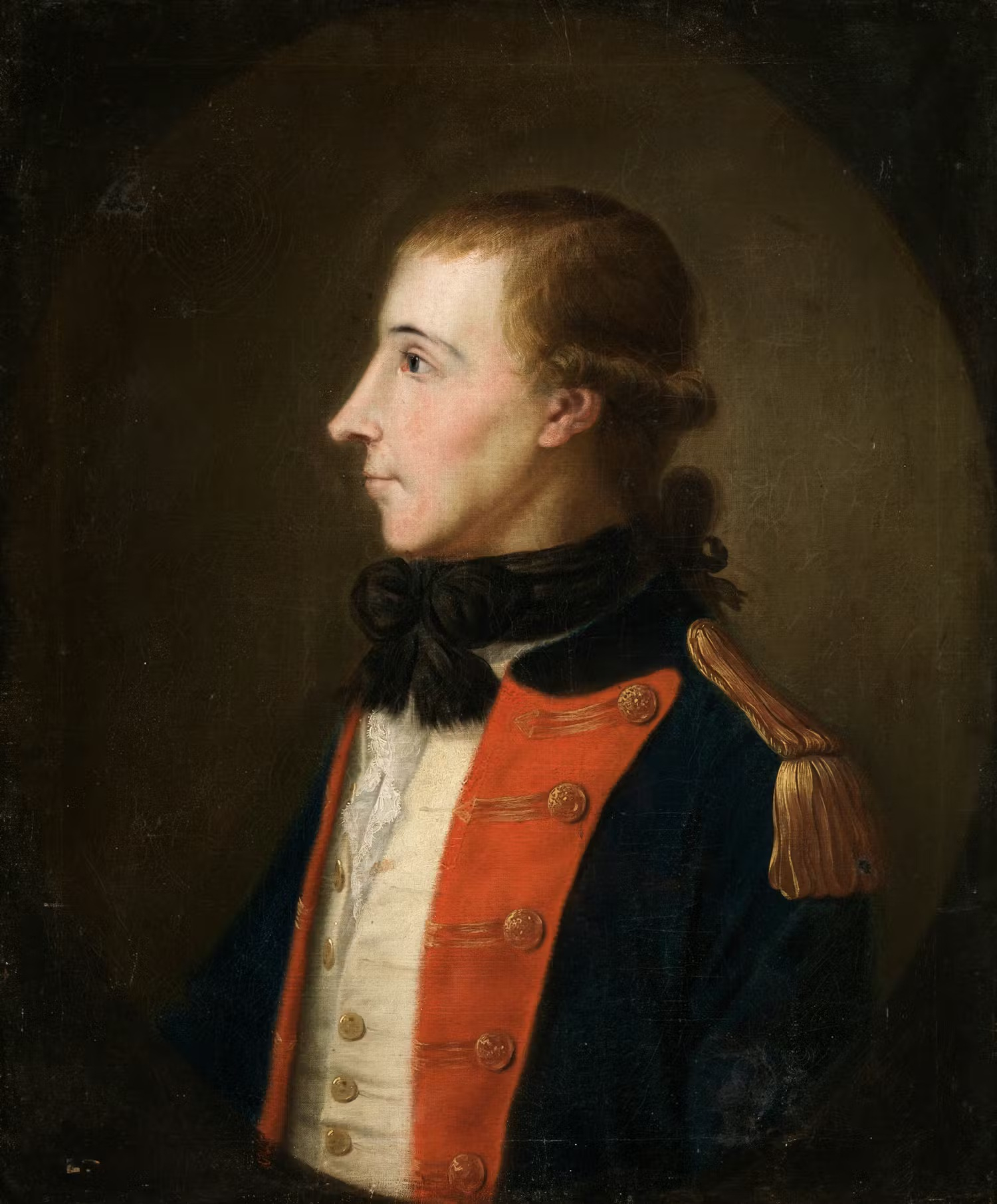
Wolfe Tone, a prominent Irish republican

Inspired by the American and French Revolutions, the Society of United Irishmen was founded in 1791 in Belfast and Dublin. The inaugural meeting of the United Irishmen in Belfast on 18 October 1791 approved a declaration of the society's objectives. It identified the central grievance that Ireland had no national government: "...we are ruled by Englishmen, and the servants of Englishmen, whose object is the interest of another country, whose instrument is corruption, and whose strength is the weakness of Ireland..." They adopted three central positions: (i) to seek out a cordial union among all the people of Ireland, to maintain that balance essential to preserve liberties and extend commerce; (ii) that the sole constitutional mode by which British influence can be opposed, is by a complete and radical reform of the representation of the people in Parliament; (iii) that no reform is practicable or efficacious, or just which shall not include Irishmen of every religious persuasion. The declaration, then, urged constitutional reform, union among Irish people and the removal of all religious disqualifications.

The movement was influenced, at least in part, by the French Revolution. Public interest, already strongly aroused, was brought to a pitch by the publication in 1790 of Edmund Burke's Reflections on the Revolution in France, and Thomas Paine's response, Rights of Man, in February 1791. Wolfe Tone wrote later that, "This controversy, and the gigantic event which gave rise to it, changed in an instant the politics of Ireland." Paine himself was aware of this commenting on sales of Part I of Rights of Man in November 1791, only eight months after publication of the first edition, he informed a friend that in England "almost sixteen thousand has gone off – and in Ireland above forty thousand". Paine may have been inclined to talk up sales of his works but what is striking in this context is that Paine believed that Irish sales were so far ahead of English ones before Part II had appeared. On 5 June 1792, Thomas Paine, author of the Rights of Man was proposed for honorary membership of the Dublin Society of the United Irishmen.

The fall of the Bastille was to be celebrated in Belfast on 14 July 1791 by a Volunteer meeting. At the request of Thomas Russell, Tone drafted suitable resolutions for the occasion, including one favouring the inclusion of Catholics in any reforms. In a covering letter to Russell, Tone wrote, "I have not said one word that looks like a wish for separation, though I give it to you and your friends as my most decided opinion that such an event would be a regeneration of their country". By 1795, Tone's republicanism and that of the society had openly crystallized when he tells us: "I remember particularly two days thae we passed on Cave Hill. On the first Russell, Neilson, Simms, McCracken and one or two more of us, on the summit of McArt's fort, took a solemn obligation...never to desist in our efforts until we had subverted the authority of England over our country and asserted her independence."

The culmination was an uprising against British rule in Ireland lasting from May to September 1798 – the Irish Rebellion of 1798 – with military support from revolutionary France in August and again October 1798. After the failure of the rising of 1798 the United Irishman, John Daly Burk, an émigré in the United States in his The History of the Late War in Ireland written in 1799, was most emphatic in its identification of the Irish, French and American causes.

== Modern republicanism ==
During the Enlightenment, anti-monarchism extended beyond the civic humanism of the Renaissance. Classical republicanism, still supported by philosophers such as Rousseau and Montesquieu, was only one of several theories seeking to limit the power of monarchies rather than directly opposing them. Liberalism and socialism departed from classical republicanism and fuelled the development of the more modern republicanism.

=== Brazil ===
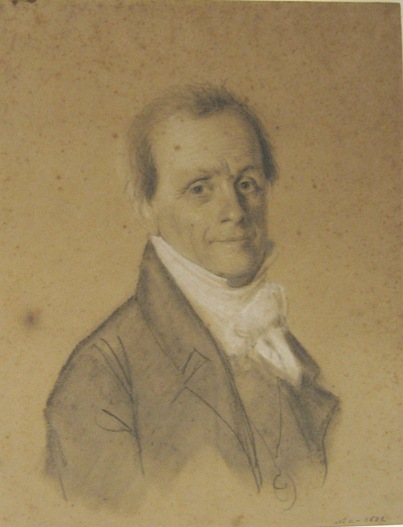
Cipriano Barata

Brazilian historiography generally identifies republican thought with the movement that was formally organized in the Empire of Brazil during the 1870s to 1880s, but republicanism was already present in the country since the First Reign (1822–1831) and the regency period (1831–1840). During Brazil's early years after its independence, the country saw the emergence of a republican discourse among the writings of figures such as Cipriano Barata, Frei Caneca and João Soares Lisboa, but republican ideology better developed as a political current after the emergence of the so-called radical liberal faction in the crisis of the final years of the First Reign.

During the First Reign, three groups emerged on the country's political scene: the moderate liberals, the radical liberals and the caramurus. The moderates defended political-institutional reforms such as decentralization, without, however, giving up the monarchical system. Their main doctrinal references were Locke, Montesquieu, Guizot and Benjamin Constant. The radicals, in turn, formed a heterogeneous group with almost no representation within the imperial bureaucracy. They were on the left of the political spectrum, along Jacobin lines, and defended broad reforms such as the abolition of the monarchy and the establishment of a republic, federalism, the extinction of the Moderating Power, the end of life tenure in the Senate, the separation between Church and State, relative social equality, the extension of political and civil rights to all free segments of society, including women, the staunch opposition to slavery, displaying a nationalist, xenophobic and anti-Portuguese discourse.

In 1870 a group of radical liberals, convinced of the impossibility of achieving their desired reforms within the Brazilian monarchical system, met and founded the Republican Party. From its founding until 1889, the party operated in an erratic and geographically diverse manner. The republican movement was strongest in the Court and in São Paulo, but other smaller foci also emerged in Minas Gerais, Pará, Pernambuco and Rio Grande do Sul. Only in São Paulo, however, did the movement become a true organized and disciplined party capable of electoral competition.

=== France ===
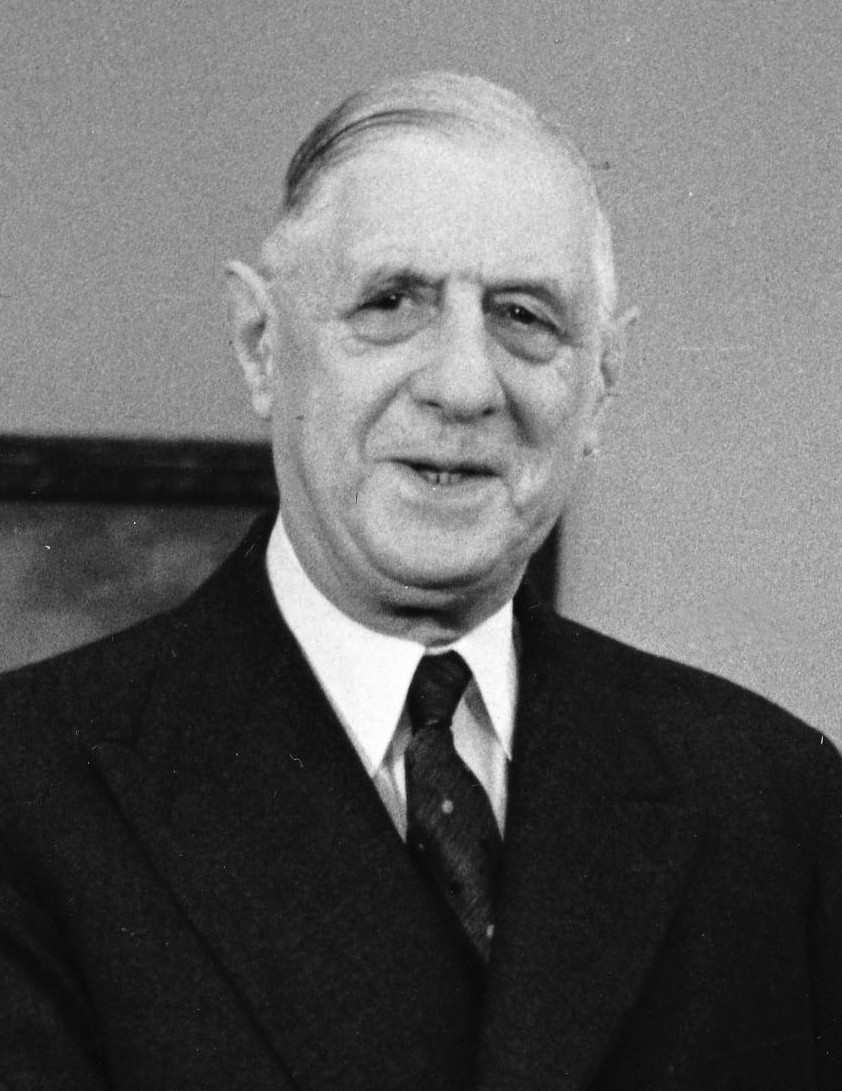
Charles de Gaulle

Discredited after the Second World War, French radicals split into a left-wing party – the Radical Party of the Left, an associate of the Socialist Party – and the Radical Party "valoisien", an associate party of the conservative Union for a Popular Movement (UMP) and its Gaullist predecessors. Italian radicals also maintained close links with republicanism, as well as with socialism, with the Partito radicale founded in 1955, which became the Transnational Radical Party in 1989.

Increasingly, after the fall of communism in 1989 and the collapse of the Marxist interpretation of the French Revolution, France increasingly turned to republicanism to define its national identity. Charles de Gaulle, presenting himself as the military saviour of France in the 1940s, and the political saviour in the 1950s, refashioned the meaning of republicanism. Both left and right enshrined him in the Republican pantheon.

=== Italy ===
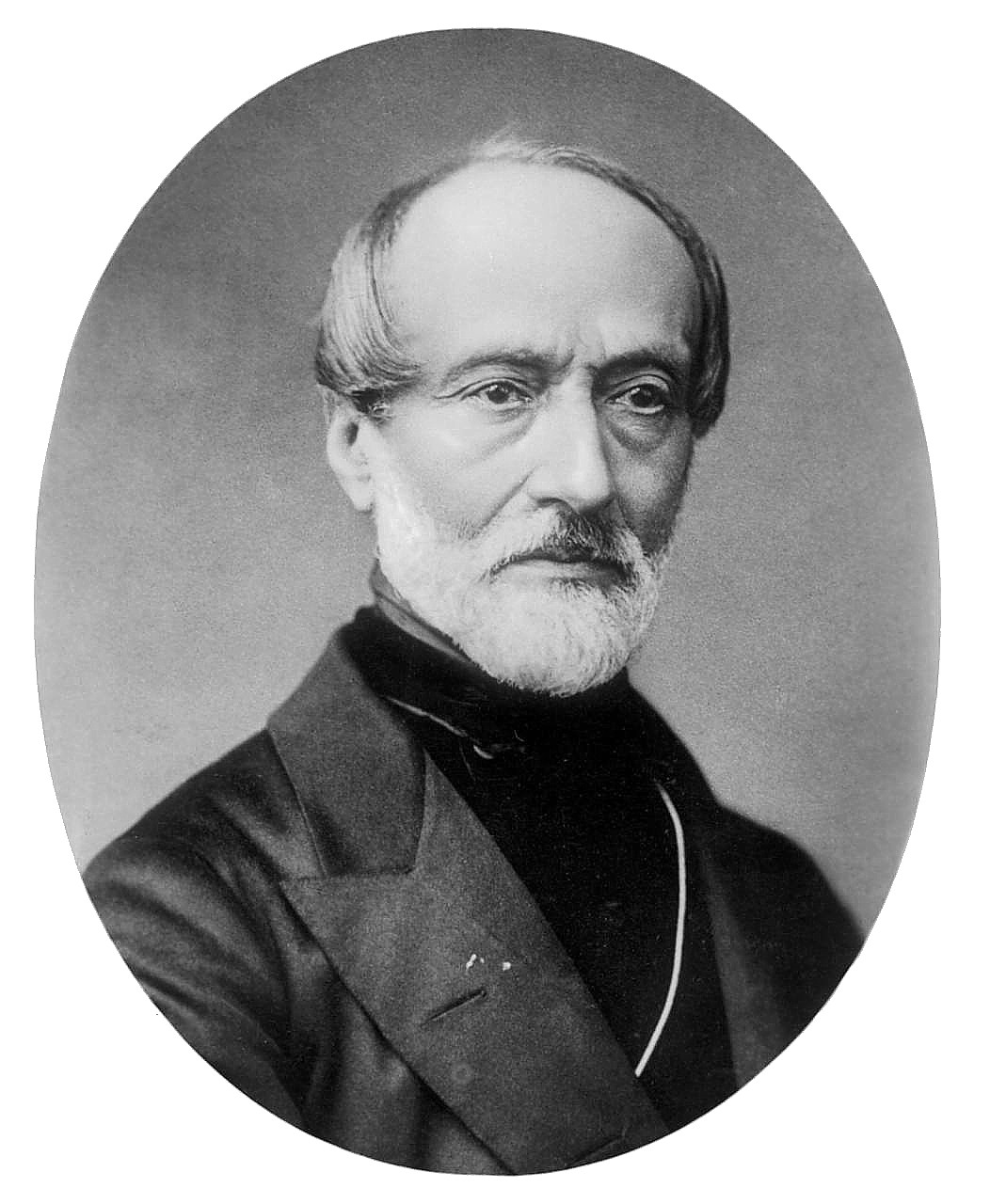
Giuseppe Mazzini, whose thoughts influenced many politicians of a later period, among them Woodrow Wilson, David Lloyd George, Mahatma Gandhi, Golda Meir, and Jawaharlal Nehru.

In the history of Italy, there are several republican governments that have followed one another over time. Examples are the ancient Roman Republic and the medieval maritime republics. From Cicero to Niccolò Machiavelli, Italian philosophers have imagined the foundations of political science and republicanism. But it was Giuseppe Mazzini who revived the republican idea in Italy in the 19th century.

An Italian nationalist in the historical radical tradition and a proponent of a republicanism of social-democratic inspiration, Mazzini helped define the modern European movement for popular democracy in a republican state. Mazzini's thoughts had a very considerable influence on the Italian and European republican movements, in the Constitution of Italy, about Europeanism and more nuanced on many politicians of a later period, among them American president Woodrow Wilson, British prime minister David Lloyd George, Mahatma Gandhi, Israeli prime minister Golda Meir and Indian prime minister Jawaharlal Nehru. Mazzini formulated a concept known as "thought and action" in which thought and action must be joined together and every thought must be followed by action, therefore rejecting intellectualism and the notion of divorcing theory from practice.

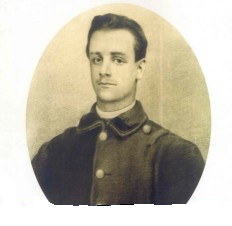
Pietro Barsanti, who is celebrated as the first martyr of the modern Italian Republic.

In July 1831, in exile in Marseille, Giuseppe Mazzini founded the Young Italy movement, which aimed to transform Italy into a unitary democratic republic, according to the principles of freedom, independence and unity, but also to oust the monarchic regimes pre-existing the unification, including the Kingdom of Sardinia. The foundation of the Young Italy constitutes a key moment of the Italian Risorgimento. The philosopher Carlo Cattaneo promoted a secular and republican Italy in the extension of Mazzini's ideas, but organized as a federal republic.

The political projects of Mazzini and Cattaneo were thwarted by the action of the Piedmontese Prime Minister Camillo Benso, Count of Cavour, and Giuseppe Garibaldi. The latter set aside his republican ideas to favour Italian unity. After having obtained the conquest of the whole of southern Italy during the Expedition of the Thousand, Garibaldi handed over the conquered territories to the king of Sardinia Victor Emmanuel II, which were annexed to the Kingdom of Sardinia after a plebiscite. This earned him heavy criticism from numerous republicans who accused him of treason. While a laborious administrative unification began, a first Italian parliament was elected and, on 17 March 1861, Victor Emmanuel II was proclaimed king of Italy.

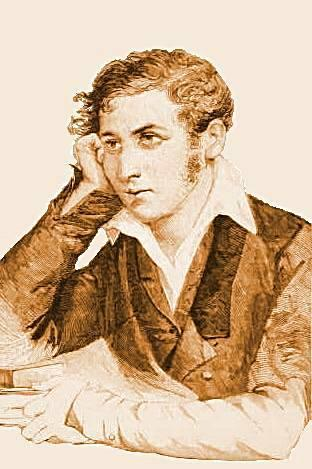
Carlo Cattaneo

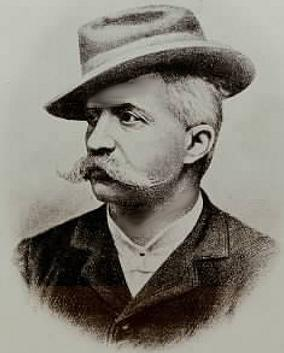
Felice Cavallotti

In the political panorama of the time there was a republican political movement which had its martyrs, such as the soldier Pietro Barsanti. Barsanti was a supporter of republican ideas, and was a soldier in the Royal Italian Army with the rank of corporal. He was sentenced to death and shot in 1870 for having favoured an insurrectional attempt against the Savoy monarchy and is therefore considered the first martyr of the modern Italian Republic, as well as a symbol of republican ideals in Italy.

The Republicans took part in the elections to the Italian Parliament, and in 1853 they formed the Action Party around Giuseppe Mazzini. Although in exile, Mazzini was elected in 1866, but refused to take his seat in parliament. Carlo Cattaneo was elected deputy in 1860 and 1867, but refused so as not to have to swear loyalty to the House of Savoy. The problem of the oath of loyalty to the monarchy, necessary to be elected, was the subject of controversy within the republican forces. In 1873 Felice Cavallotti, one of the most committed Italian politicians against the monarchy, preceded his oath with a declaration in which he reaffirmed his republican beliefs.

In October 1922, the nomination of Benito Mussolini as prime minister by King Victor Emmanuel III, following the march on Rome, paved the way for the establishment of the dictatorship. With the implementation of fascist laws (Royal Decree of 6 November 1926), all political parties operating on Italian territory were dissolved, with the exception of the National Fascist Party. The Kingdom of Italy entered World War II on 10 June 1940. Hostilities ended on 29 April 1945, when the German forces in Italy surrendered.

The aftermath of World War II left Italy also with an anger against the monarchy for its endorsement of the Fascist regime for the previous twenty years. These frustrations contributed to a revival of the Italian republican movement. Italy became a republic after the 1946 Italian institutional referendum held on 2 June, a day celebrated since as Festa della Repubblica. It was the first time that the whole Italian Peninsula was under a form of republican governance since the end of the ancient Roman Republic.

The Italian Republican Party (Italian: Partito Repubblicano Italiano, PRI) is a political party in Italy established in 1895, which makes it the oldest political party still active in the country. The PRI identifies with 19th-century classical radicalism, as well as Mazzinianism, and its modern incarnation is associated with liberalism, social liberalism, and centrism. The PRI has old roots and a long history that began with a left-wing position, being the heir of the Historical Far Left and claiming descent from the political thought of Giuseppe Mazzini and Giuseppe Garibaldi. With the rise of the Italian Communist Party (PCI) and the Italian Socialist Party (PSI) to its left, the PRI was associated with centre-left politics. The early PRI was also known for its anti-clerical, anti-monarchist, republican, and later anti-fascist stances. While maintaining those traits, during the second half of the 20th century the party moved towards the centre on the left–right political spectrum, becoming increasingly economically liberal.

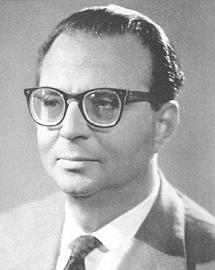
Ugo La Malfa was a politician and an important leader of the Italian Republican Party

After 1949, the PRI was a member of the pro-NATO alliance formed by Christian Democracy (DC), the Italian Democratic Socialist Party (PSDI), and the Italian Liberal Party (PLI), enabling it to participate in most governments of the 1950s, a period later known as Centrism. In 1963, the party helped bring together DC and PSI in Italy's first centre-left government, the Organic centre-left. Although small in terms of voter support, the PRI was influential thanks to leaders like Eugenio Chiesa, Giovanni Conti, Cipriano Facchinetti, Randolfo Pacciardi, Oronzo Reale, Ugo La Malfa, Bruno Visentini, Oddo Biasini, and Giovanni Spadolini.

As part of the Pentapartito governing coalition, Spadolini served as Prime Minister of Italy in 1981–1982, the first non Christian Democrat since 1945. From 1976 to 2010, the PRI was a member of the European Liberal Democrat and Reform Party (ELDR), along with the PLI, and the two parties usually ran together in European Parliament elections. After joining the centrist Segni Pact in 1994, the PRI was part of the centre-left coalition from 1996 to 2006, and then of the centre-right coalition from 2008 to 2013 (its leader Giorgio La Malfa was minister in 2005–2006). Afterwards, it ran alone until joining the centrist Action – Italia Viva in 2022.

=== Latin America ===
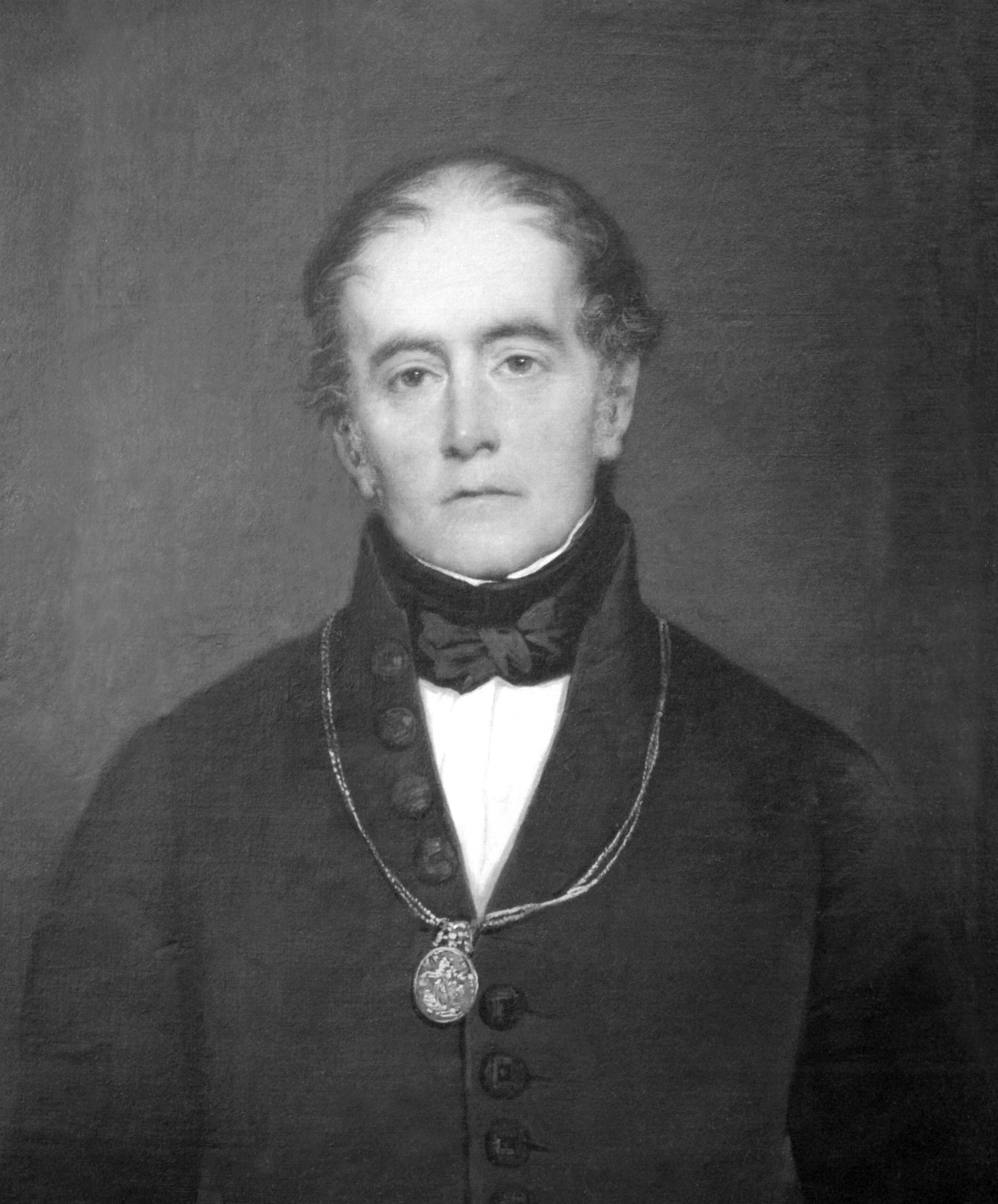
Andrés Bello

Republicanism helped inspire movements for independence in former Spanish colonies of Latin America in the early 19th century, and republican ideals and political designs were influential in the new Latin American republics. Diplomats and international jurists in Latin America, such as Andrés Bello, shaped a tradition of "republican internationalism" that connected domestic republican ideals and practices with the region's emerging place in international society.

Many key political figures in the region identified as republicans, including Simón Bolívar, José María Samper, Francisco Bilbao, and Juan Egaña. Several of these figures produced essays, pamphlets, and collections of speeches that drew upon and adapted the broader tradition of republican political thought.

=== Spain ===
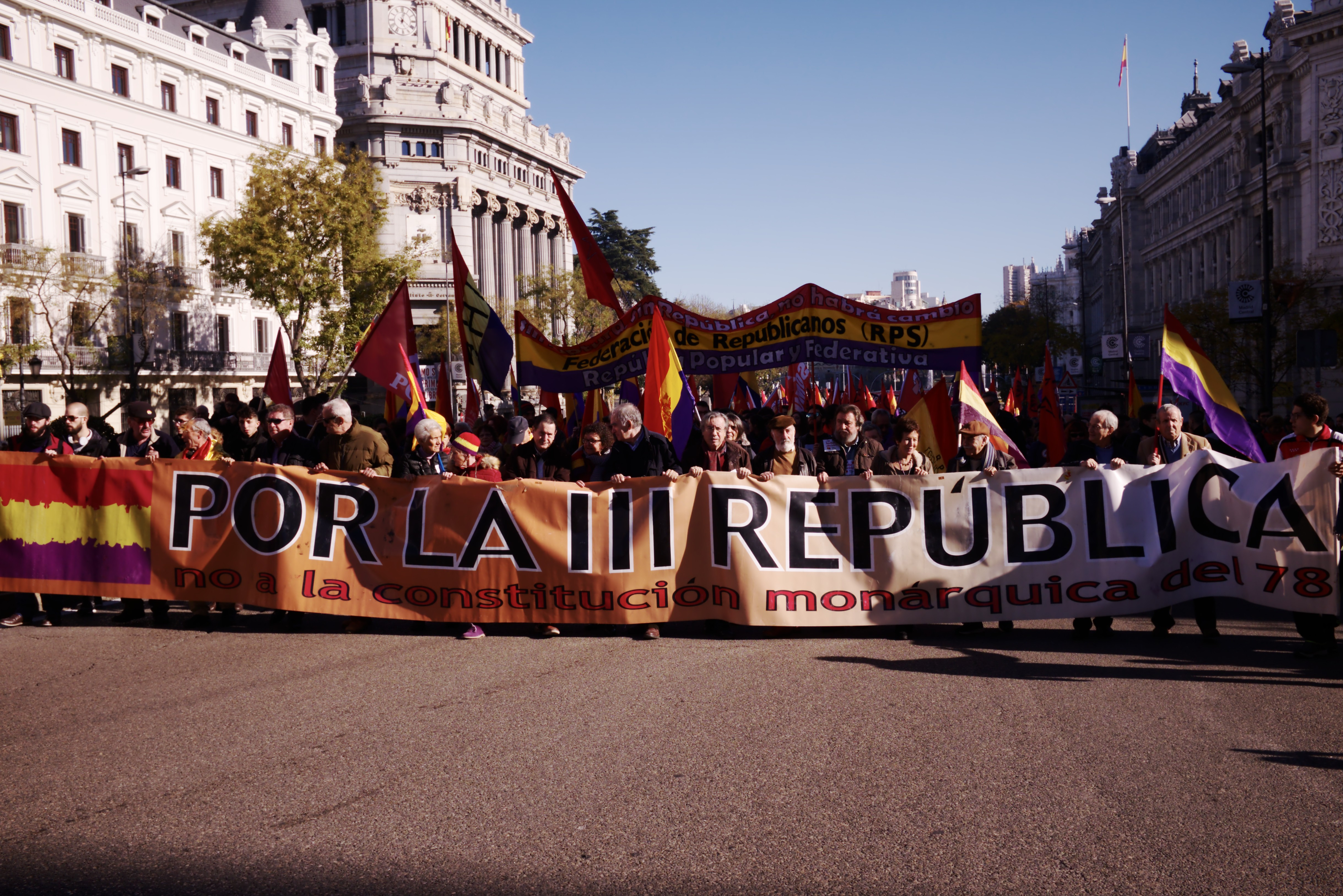
2018 demonstration in Madrid calling for the Third Spanish Republic

There has existed in Spain a persistent trend of republican thought, especially throughout the 19th, 20th, and 21st centuries, that has manifested itself in diverse political parties and movements over the entire course of the history of Spain. While these movements have shared the objective of establishing a republic, during these three centuries there have surged distinct schools of thought on the form republicans would want to give to the Spanish State: unitary or federal. The roots of Spanish republicanism arose out of liberal thought in the wake of the French Revolution. The first manifestations of republicanism occurred during the Peninsular War, in which Spain and nearby regions fought for independence from Napoleon, 1808–1814. During the reign of Ferdinand VII (1813–1833) there were several liberalist military pronunciamientos, but it was not until the reign of Isabella II (1833–1868) that the first clearly republican and anti-monarchist movements appeared.

There is a renewed interest in republicanism in Spain after two earlier attempts: the First Spanish Republic (1873–1874) and the Second Spanish Republic (1931–1939). Movements such as Ciudadanos Por la República, Citizens for the Republic in Spanish, have emerged, and parties like United Left and the Republican Left of Catalonia increasingly refer to republicanism. In a survey conducted in 2007 reported that 69% of the population prefer the monarchy to continue, compared with 22% opting for a republic. In a 2008 survey, 58% of Spanish citizens were indifferent, 16% favoured a republic, 16% were monarchists, and 7% claimed they were Juancarlistas (supporters of continued monarchy under King Juan Carlos I, without a common position for the fate of the monarchy after his death). In recent years, there has been a tie between Monarchists and Republicans.

=== Turkey ===
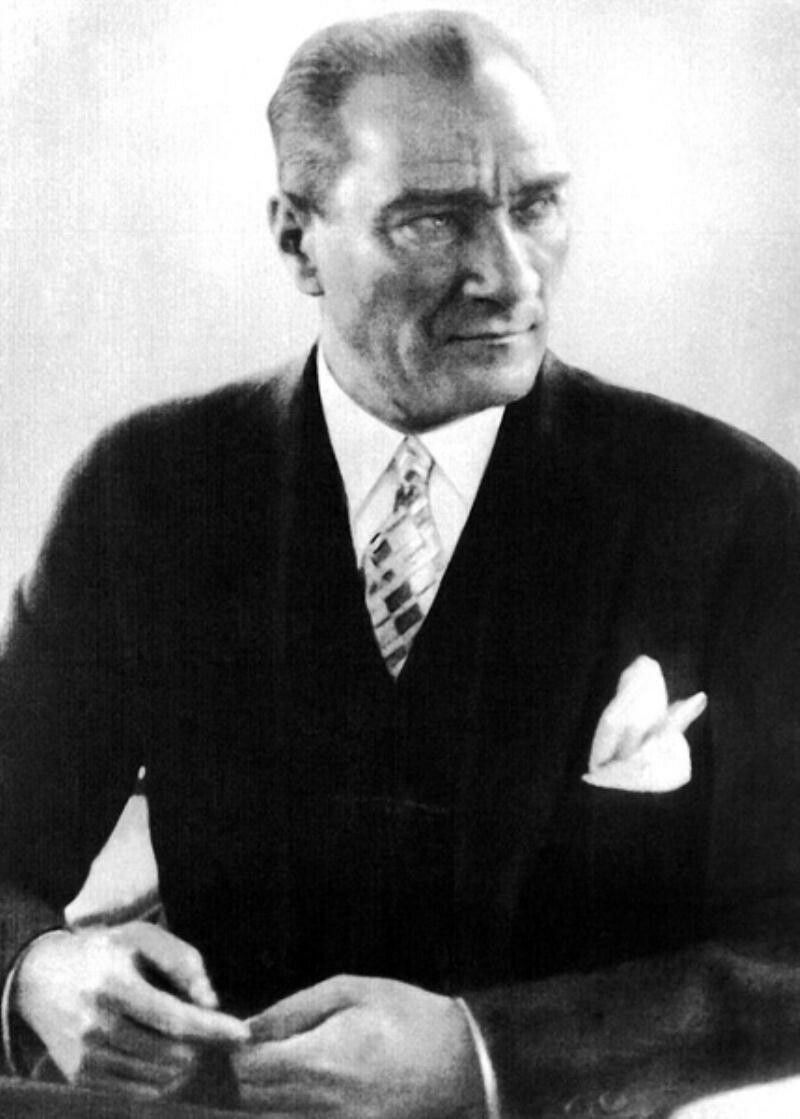
Mustafa Kemal Atatürk

In 1923 after the fall of the Ottoman Empire an inherited aristocracy and sultanate suppressed republican ideas until the successful republican revolution of Mustafa Kemal Atatürk in the 1920s. Republicanism remains one of the six principles of Kemalism. Kemalism, as it was implemented by Mustafa Kemal Atatürk after the declaration of Republic in 1923, was defined by sweeping political, social, cultural and religious reforms designed to separate the new Turkish state from its Ottoman predecessor and embrace a Western-style modernized lifestyle, including the establishment of secularism/laicism, state support of the sciences, free education, gender equality, economic statism and many more. Most of those policies were first introduced to and implemented in Turkey during Atatürk's presidency through his reforms.

Many of the root ideas of Kemalism began during the late Ottoman Empire under various reforms to avoid the imminent collapse of the Empire, beginning chiefly in the early 19th-century Tanzimat reforms. The mid-century Young Ottomans attempted to create the ideology of Ottoman nationalism, or Ottomanism, to quell the rising ethnic nationalism in the Empire and introduce limited democracy for the first time while maintaining Islamist influences. In the early 20th century, the Young Turks abandoned Ottoman nationalism in favour of early Turkish nationalism, while adopting a secular political outlook. After the demise of the Ottoman Empire, Atatürk, influenced by both the Young Ottomans and the Young Turks, as well as by their successes and failures, led the declaration of the Republic of Turkey in 1923, borrowing from the earlier movements' ideas of secularism and Turkish nationalism, while implementing free education and other reforms that have been enshrined by later leaders into guidelines for governing Turkey.

=== United Kingdom ===
Dissatisfaction with British rule led to a longer period of agitation in the early 19th century and failed republican revolutions in Canada in the late 1830s and Ireland in 1848. This led to the Treason Felony Act in 1848 which made it illegal to advocate for republicanism. Another "significant incarnation" of republicanism broke out in the late 19th century when Queen Victoria went into mourning and largely disappeared from public view after the death of her husband, Prince Albert. This led to questions about whether or not the institution should continue, with politicians speaking in support of abolition. This ended when Victoria returned to public duties later in the century and regained significant public support. More recently, in the early 21st century, increasing dissatisfaction with the House of Windsor, especially after the death of Elizabeth II in 2022, has led to public support for the monarchy reaching historical lows.

=== United States ===
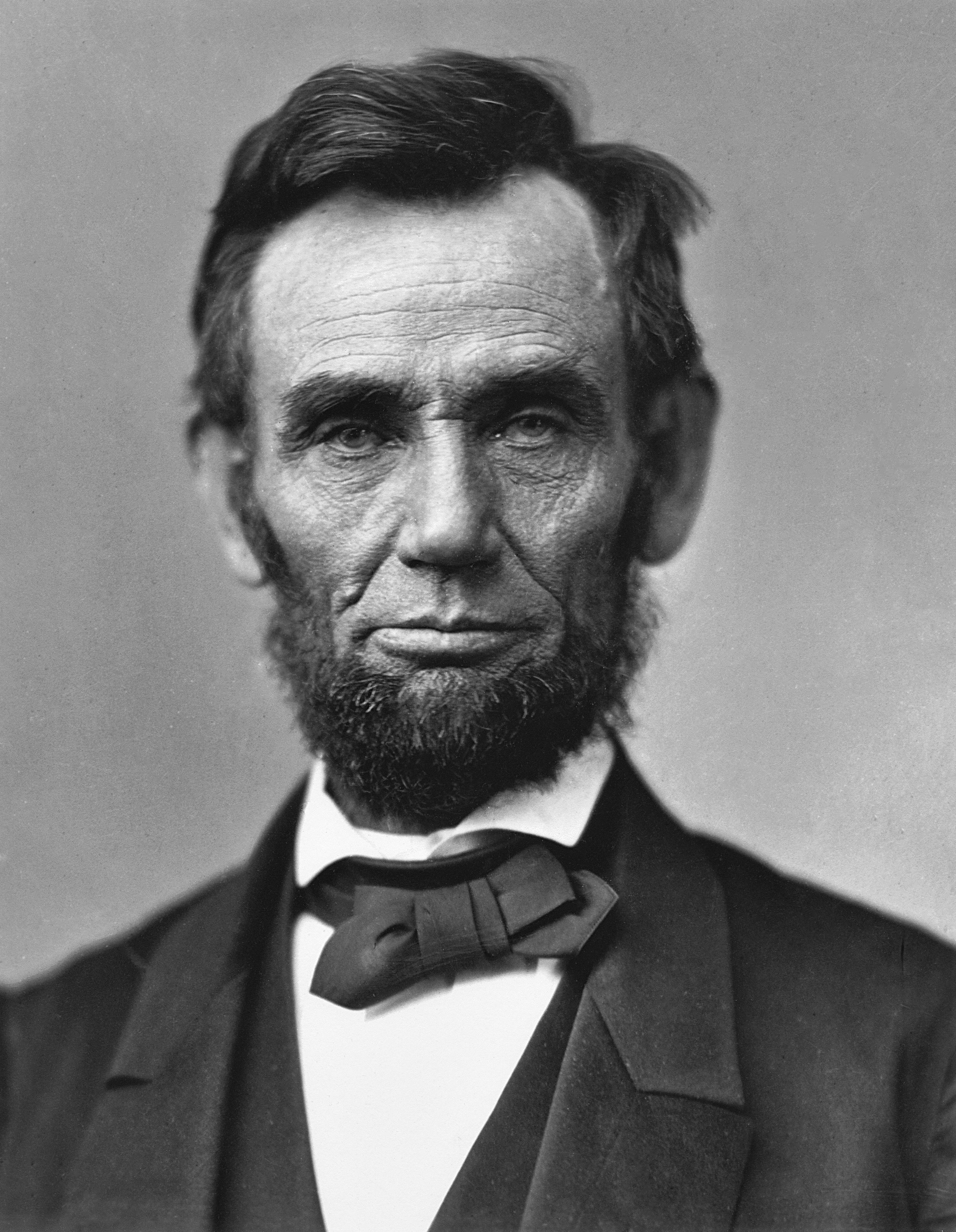
Abraham Lincoln

The values and ideals of republicanism are foundational in the constitution and history of the United States. As the United States constitution prohibits granting titles of nobility, republicanism in this context does not refer to a political movement to abolish such a social class, as it does in countries such as the UK, Australia, and the Netherlands. Instead, it refers to the core values that citizenry in a republic have, or ought to have. Political scientists and historians have described these central values as liberty and inalienable individual rights; recognizing the sovereignty of the people as the source of all authority in law; rejecting monarchy, aristocracy, and hereditary political power; virtue and faithfulness in the performance of civic duties; and vilification of corruption. These values are based on those of Ancient Greco-Roman, Renaissance, and English models and ideas.

Republicanism became the dominant political value of Americans during and after the American Revolution. The Founding Fathers were strong advocates of republican values, especially Thomas Jefferson, Samuel Adams, Patrick Henry, Thomas Paine, Benjamin Franklin, John Adams, James Madison and Alexander Hamilton. However, in 1854, social movements started to harness values of abolitionism and free labour. These burgeoning radical traditions in America became epitomized in the early formation of the Republican Party, known as "red republicanism." The efforts were primarily led by political leaders such as Alvan E. Bovay, Thaddeus Stevens, and Abraham Lincoln.

== Theory ==
=== Neo-republicanism ===
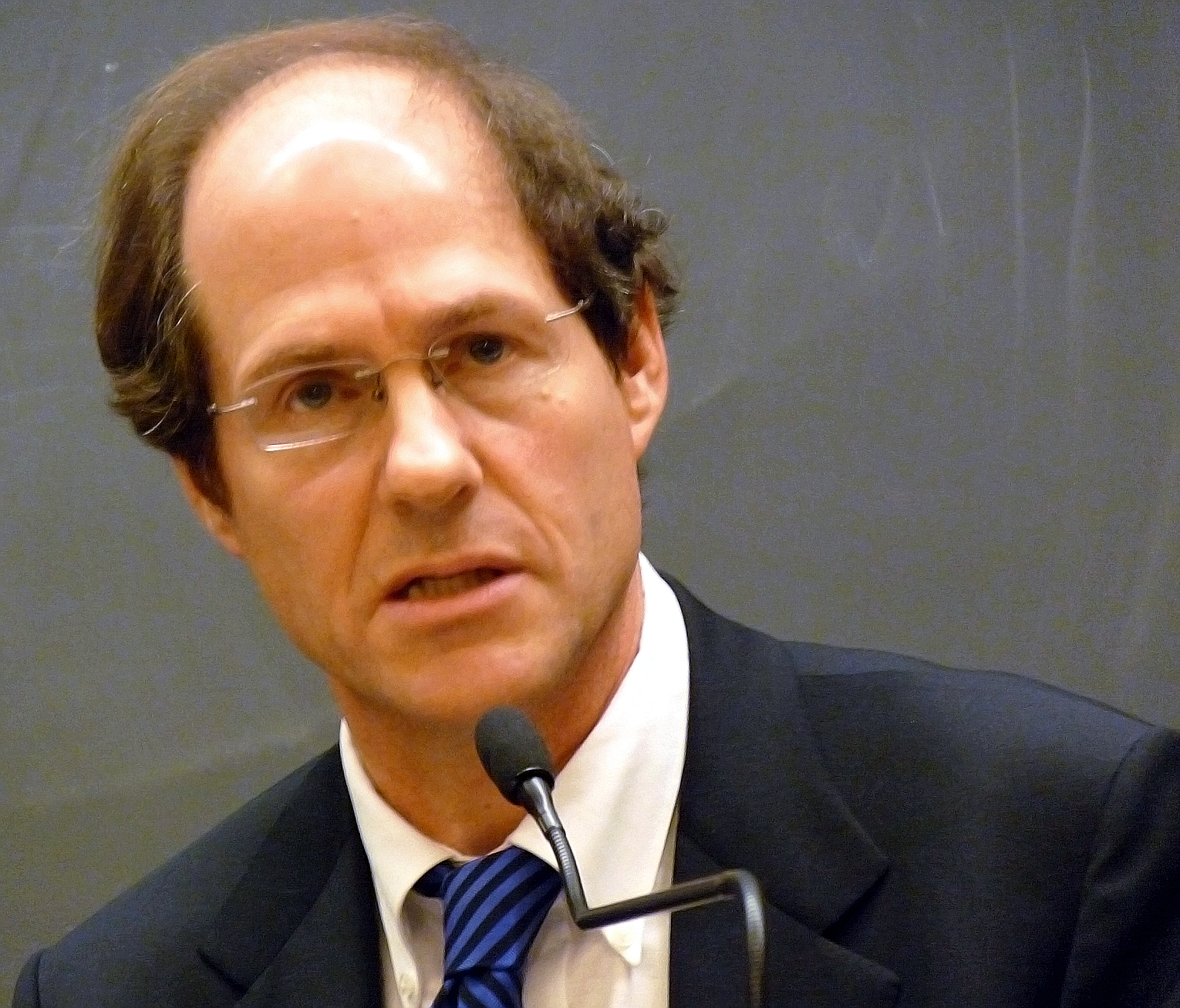
Cass Sunstein

Neorepublicanism is the effort by current scholars to draw on a classical republican tradition in the development of an attractive public philosophy intended for contemporary purposes. Neorepublicanism emerges as an alternative postsocialist critique of market society from the left.

Prominent theorists in this movement are Philip Pettit and Cass Sunstein, who have each written several works defining republicanism and how it differs from liberalism. Michael Sandel, a late convert to republicanism from communitarianism, advocates replacing or supplementing liberalism with republicanism, as outlined in his Democracy's Discontent: America in Search of a Public Philosophy.

Contemporary work from a neorepublican include jurist K. Sabeel Rahman's book Democracy Against Domination, which seeks to create a neorepublican framework for economic regulation grounded in the thought of Louis Brandeis and John Dewey and popular control, in contrast to both New Deal-style managerialism and neoliberal deregulation. Philosopher Elizabeth Anderson's Private Government traces the history of republican critiques of private power, arguing that the classical free market policies of the 18th and 19th centuries intended to help workers only lead to their domination by employers. In From Slavery to the Cooperative Commonwealth, political scientist Alex Gourevitch examines a strain of late 19th century American republicanism known as labour republicanism that was the producerist labour union The Knights of Labor, and how republican concepts were used in service of workers rights, but also with a strong critique of the role of that union in supporting the Chinese Exclusion Act.

=== Democracy ===
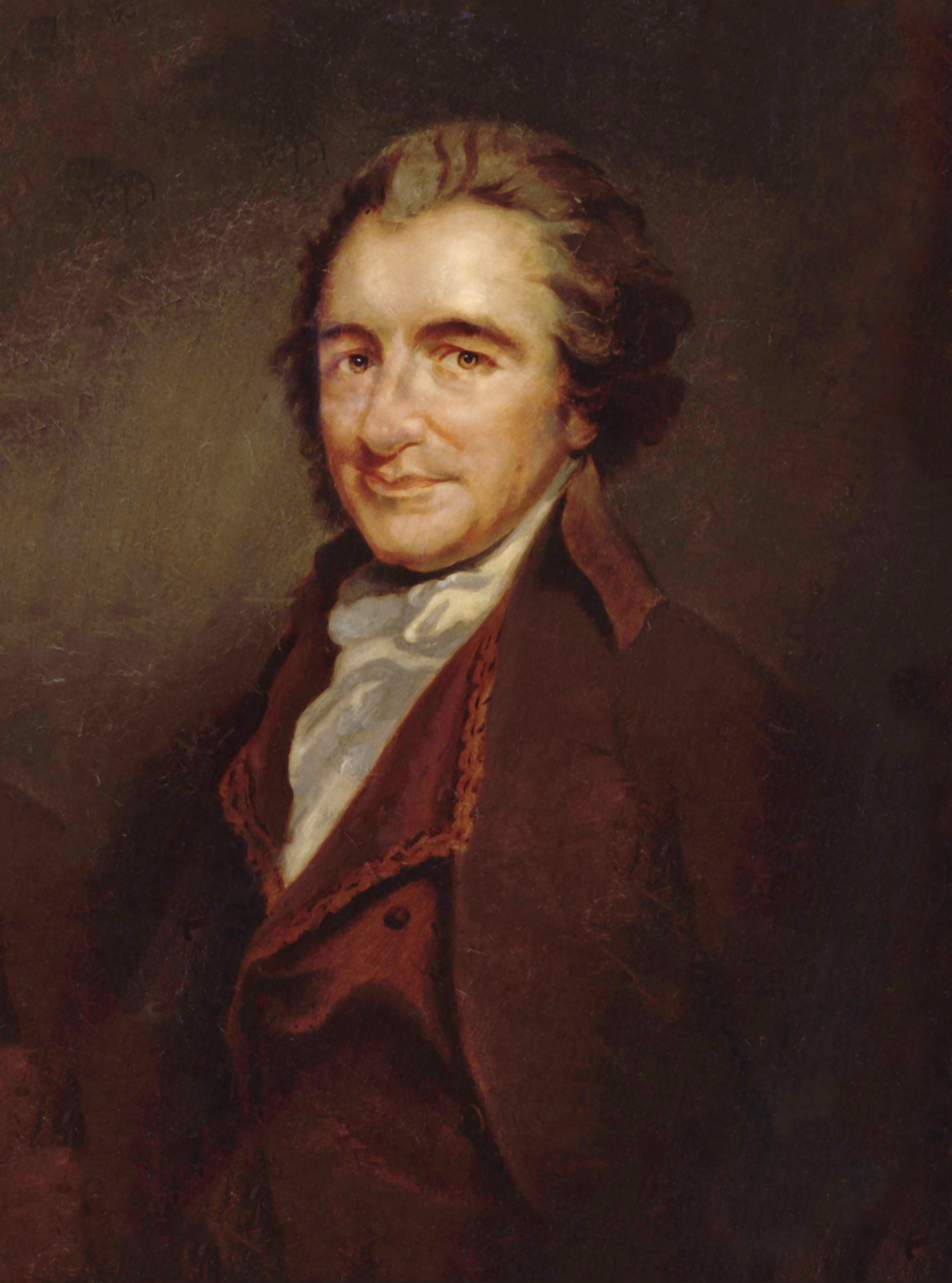
Portrait of Thomas Paine

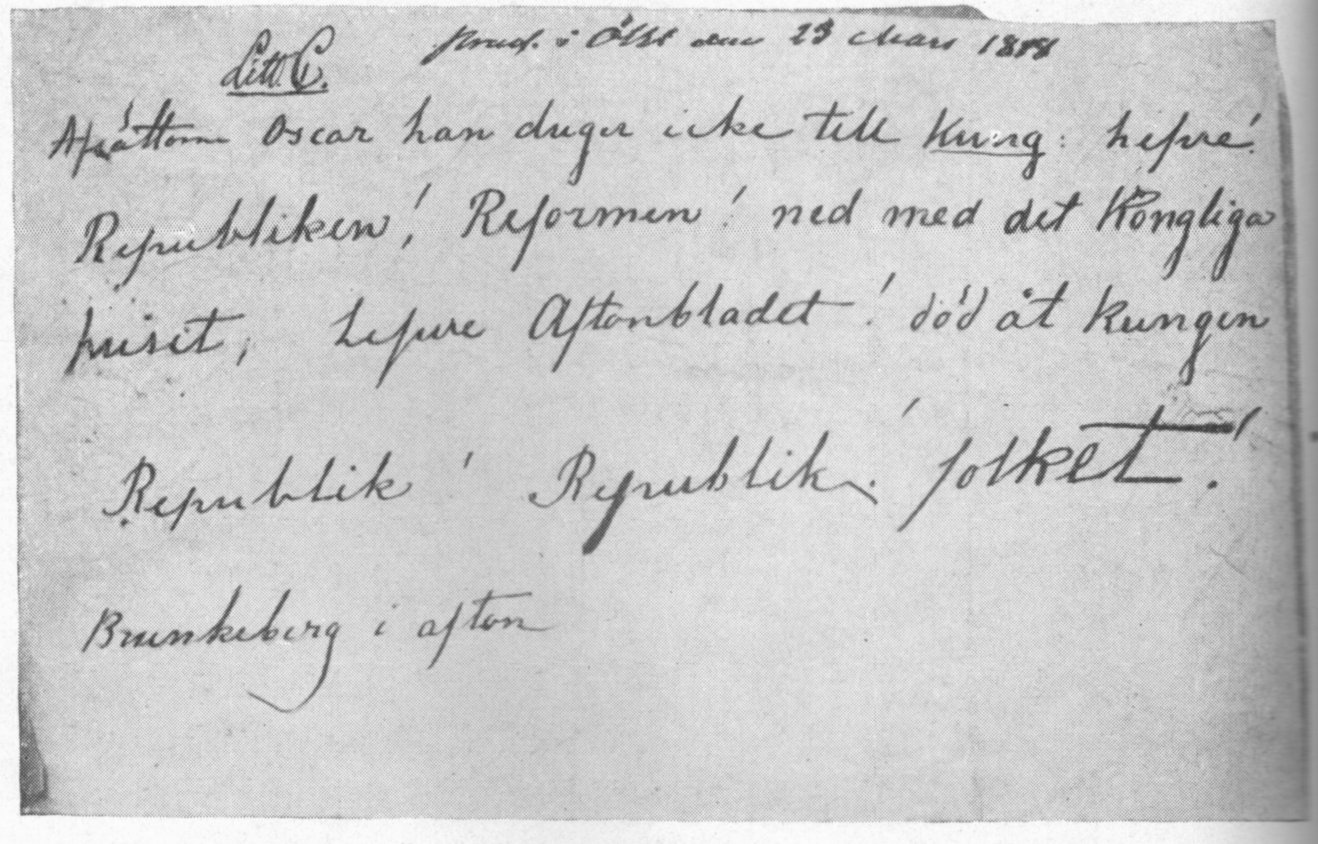
A revolutionary republican hand-written bill from the Stockholm riots during the Revolutions of 1848, reading: "Dethrone Oscar he is not fit to be a king – rather the Republic! Reform! Down with the Royal house – long live Aftonbladet! Death to the king – Republic! Republic! – the people! Brunkeberg this evening." The writer's identity is unknown.

In the late 18th century there was convergence of democracy and republicanism. Republicanism is a system that replaces or accompanies inherited rule. There is an emphasis on liberty, and a rejection of corruption. It strongly influenced the American Revolution and the French Revolution in the 1770s and 1790s, respectively. Republicans, in these two examples, tended to reject inherited elites and aristocracies, but left open two questions: whether a republic, to restrain unchecked majority rule, should have an unelected upper chamber—perhaps with members appointed as meritorious experts—and whether it should have a constitutional monarch.

Though conceptually separate from democracy, republicanism included the key principles of rule by consent of the governed and sovereignty of the people. In effect, republicanism held that kings and aristocracies were not the real rulers, but rather the whole people were. Exactly how the people were to rule was an issue of democracy: republicanism itself did not specify a means. In the United States, the solution was the creation of political parties that reflected the votes of the people and controlled the government (see Republicanism in the United States). In Federalist No. 10, James Madison rejected "pure democracy" in favour of representative democracy, which he called "a republic". There were similar debates in many other democratizing nations.

In contemporary usage, the term democracy refers to a government chosen by the people, whether it is direct or representative. Today the term republic usually refers to representative democracy with an elected head of state, such as a president, who serves for a limited term; in contrast to states with a hereditary monarch as a head of state, even if these states also are representative democracies, with an elected or appointed head of government such as a prime minister.

The Founding Fathers of the United States rarely praised and often criticized (direct) democracy, which they equated with mob rule; James Madison argued that what distinguished a democracy from a republic was that the former became weaker as it got larger and suffered more violently from the effects of faction, whereas a republic could get stronger as it got larger and combatted faction by its very structure. What was critical to American values, John Adams insisted, was that the government should be "bound by fixed laws, which the people have a voice in making, and a right to defend." Thomas Jefferson warned that "an elective despotism is not the government we fought for." Professors Richard Ellis of Willamette University and Michael Nelson of Rhodes College argue that much constitutional thought, from Madison to Lincoln and beyond, has focused on "the problem of majority tyranny." They conclude, "The principles of republican government embedded in the Constitution represent an effort by the framers to ensure that the inalienable rights of life, liberty, and the pursuit of happiness would not be trampled by majorities."

=== Constitutional monarchs and upper chambers ===
Some countries (such as the United Kingdom, the Netherlands, Belgium, Luxembourg, the Scandinavian countries, and Japan) turned powerful monarchs into constitutional ones with limited, or eventually merely symbolic, powers. Often the monarchy was abolished along with the aristocratic system, whether or not they were replaced with democratic institutions (such as in France, China, Iran, Russia, Germany, Austria, Hungary, Italy, Greece, Turkey and Egypt). In Australia, New Zealand, Canada, Papua New Guinea, and some other countries the monarch, or its representative, is given supreme executive power, but by convention acts only on the advice of his or her ministers. Many nations had elite upper houses of legislatures, the members of which often had lifetime tenure, but eventually these houses lost much power (as the UK House of Lords), or else became elective and remained powerful.

== See also ==
- Abolition of monarchy
- Christian republic
- Criticism of monarchy
- Democratic republic
- Federal Council (Switzerland)
- Islamic republic
- Kemalism
- People's republic
- Primus inter pares
- Republican Party
  - GOP ("Grand Old Party")
- Secular republic
- Tacitean studies – differing interpretations whether Tacitus defended republicanism ("red Tacitists") or the contrary ("black Tacitists").
- Venizelism
- Category:Republicanism by country
