= Republican Democratic Concentration =

Republican Democratic Concentration Concentrazione Democratica Repubblicana
- Leaders: Ferruccio Parri, Ugo La Malfa
- Founded: February 8, 1946
- Dissolved: September 8, 1946
- Split from: Action Party
- Merged into: Italian Republican Party
- Ideology: Social liberalism
- Political position: Centre-left

The Republican Democratic Concentration (Italian: Concentrazione Democratica Repubblicana; CDR) was a liberal and republican list which contested in the Italian general election of 1946. It was formed in February 1946 by Ferruccio Parri, a former Prime Minister of Italy, and Ugo La Malfa, following a split from the Action Party (PdA) which had just turned on socialist ideas. The two parties that merged into the CDR were:

- the Movement of Republican Democracy (Movimento della Democrazia Repubblicana), born on the initiative of Ferruccio Parri and Ugo La Malfa, who had left the Action Party during the first national congress held in February 1946. The movement also joined Oronzo Reale, Bruno Visentini and, initially, Altiero Spinelli;
- the Progressive Liberal Movement (Movimento Liberale Progressista), founded following the split, within the Italian Liberal Party, of the left faction against the creation of the National Democratic Union.

Its symbol was a black shield with a star above a little helmet.

The election gave poor results for both the CDR and the PdA. The CDR obtained only 0.4% of the votes and only the two leaders were elected, that decided to join the Republican group in the Constituent Assembly. In September, the CDR merged into the Italian Republican Party.
