= The Clover =

Italian political coalition

The Clover Il Trifoglio
- Founded: 27 October 1999
- Dissolved: 8 February 2000
- Political position: Centre

The Clover (Italian: Il Trifoglio) was a centrist coalition of Italian political parties.

It was launched on 27 October 1999 and led by Francesco Cossiga, who supported the D'Alema I Cabinet since its formation via his Democratic Union for the Republic (UDR). The idea of The Clover was to unify those political forces within the majority which felt marginalised. The coalition was composed of three parties:

- the Italian Democratic Socialists (SDI, social-democratic, leader: Enrico Boselli)
- the Union for the Republic (UpR, Christian-democratic and liberal, leader: Francesco Cossiga)
- the Italian Republican Party (PRI, liberal, leader: Giorgio La Malfa)

The coalition was responsible of bringing down the D'Alema I Cabinet (Massimo D'Alema resigned on 18 December) and decided not to enter into the D'Alema II Cabinet. At that point The Clover had 18 deputies, eight senators and two ministers: Carlo Scognamiglio Pasini (UpR, Defence) and Angelo Piazza (SDI, Public Administration).

On 8 February 2000, after Cossiga had hinted at the possibility of making an alliance with the centre-right Pole of Freedoms, SDI left the coalition, while some of its members, including Claudio Martelli and Bobo Craxi, formed the Socialist League, which replaced SDI as third component of The Clover.

Since then, the coalition was loosened and each party started to take autonomous decisions, but by the 2001 general election all the three groups had joined the centre-right House of Freedoms coalition led by Silvio Berlusconi in different ways: the Socialist League took part to the foundation of the New Italian Socialist Party, PRI signed an electoral pact with Forza Italia and UpR merged into that party.
