= Union for the Republic (Italy) =

Italian political party

Union for the Republic Unione per la Repubblica
- Leader: Francesco Cossiga
- Founded: 5 November 1999
- Dissolved: 21 May 2001
- Merged into: Forza Italia
- Ideology: Christian democracy
- Political position: Centre
- National affiliation: The Clover

The Union for the Republic (Italian: Unione per la Repubblica, UpR) was a centrist political party in Italy.

It was formed by Francesco Cossiga and his followers after the break-up of the Democratic Union for the Republic (UDR) in November 1999.

The UpR formed a short-lived centrist alliance called The Clover with the Italian Democratic Socialists (SDI) and Italian Republican Party (PRI), which was responsible for the fall of the D'Alema I Cabinet on 18 December. Consequently, the UpR did not enter in D'Alema II Cabinet.

Most UpR members, with the notable exception of Carlo Scognamiglio, joined Forza Italia prior to the 2001 general election.
