= Ugo La Malfa =

Italian politician (1903–1979)

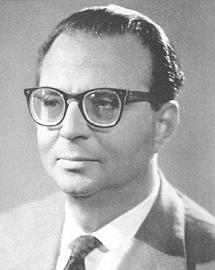
- La Malfa in the early 1960s

Deputy Prime Minister of Italy
- In office 21 March 1979 – 26 March 1979
- Prime Minister: Giulio Andreotti
- Preceded by: Himself
- Succeeded by: Arnaldo Forlani
- In office 23 November 1974 – 12 February 1976
- Prime Minister: Aldo Moro
- Preceded by: Mario Tanassi
- Succeeded by: Himself

Secretary of the Italian Republican Party
- In office April 1965 – February 1975
- Preceded by: Oddo Biasini
- Succeeded by: Oddo Biasini
Ministerial offices
Minister of Budget
In office 21 March 1979 – 26 March 1979
Prime Minister	Giulio Andreotti
Preceded by	Tommaso Morlino
Succeeded by	Bruno Visentini
In office 22 February 1962 – 21 June 1963
Prime Minister	Amintore Fanfani
Preceded by	Giuseppe Pella
Succeeded by	Giuseppe Medici
Minister of Treasury
In office 8 July 1973 – 15 March 1974
Prime Minister	Mariano Rumor
Preceded by	Giovanni Malagodi
Succeeded by	Emilio Colombo
Minister of Transport
In office 17 June 1945 – 8 December 1945
Prime Minister	Ferruccio Parri
Preceded by	Francesco Cerabona
Succeeded by	Riccardo Lombardi
Parliamentary offices
Member of the Chamber of Deputies
In office 8 May 1948 – 26 March 1979
Constituency	Bologna (1948–1972); Rome (1972–1979)
Member of the Constituent Assembly
In office 25 June 1946 – 31 January 1948
Constituency	Italy at-large

Personal details
- Born: 16 May 1903 Palermo, Italy
- Died: 26 March 1979 (aged 75) Rome, Italy
- Party: PdA (1942–1946); CDR (1946); PRI (1946–1979)
- Children: Giorgio
- Education: Ca' Foscari University of Venice
- Profession: Politics; Journalist

Ugo La Malfa (16 May 1903 – 26 March 1979) was an Italian politician and an important leader of the Italian Republican Party (Partito Repubblicano Italiano; PRI).

== Early years and anti-fascist resistance ==
La Malfa was born in Palermo, Sicily. After completing his secondary schooling, he enrolled in the Ca' Foscari University of Venice in the Department of Diplomatic Sciences with professors Silvio Trentin and Gino Luzzatto.

During his years at the university, he had contacts within the republican movement of Treviso and other anti-fascist groups. In 1924, he moved to Rome and participated in the foundation of the Goliardic Union for Freedom. On 14 June 1925, he participated in the first conference of the National Democratic Union, founded by Giovanni Amendola. The movement was later declared illegal under Mussolini's fascist government. In 1926, he graduated with a thesis dealing sharply with human rights. During his military service, he was transferred to Sardinia to disrupt the anti-fascist publication Pietre, on which he worked. By 1928, he was among those arrested following the 12 April bombing in the Fiera di Milano for allegedly planning to assassinate Italian King Victor Emmanuel III, only to be interrogated and released.

In 1929, he took a job editing the Treccani Encyclopaedia, working under the direction of the liberal philosopher Ugo Spirito. At the request of Raffaele Mattioli, he took a job with Mattioli's Italian Commercial Bank in 1933, of which he became director in 1938. During these years, he showed his expertise in both economics and leadership. There, he forged relations between anti-fascist groups to build a web that formed the Partito d'Azione, over which he presided as a founder. On 1 January 1943, La Malfa and the lawyer Adolfo Tino succeeded in publishing the first issue of their clandestine publication, L'Italia Libera. Later that year, La Malfa fled Italy to escape arrest, travelling to Switzerland, where he had contacts with a British Special Operations Executive representative. With these, he tried to organize a trip to London to use his influence at the Foreign Office. He tried to prevent the Allied invasion of Italy and to obtain a negotiated Italian retreat from the war. Later, he returned to Rome to participate in the resistance movement with the Partito d'Azione and the Comitato di Liberazione Nazionale.

== Republican career ==
In 1945, under the reconstruction government of Ferruccio Parri, La Malfa assumed the role of Minister of Transportation. In the following government, under Alcide De Gasperi, he was Minister of Reconstruction, a position later renamed Minister of International Commerce. In February 1946, the first conference of the Partito d'Azione was held, during which Emilio Lussu prevailed in determining party philosophy, and La Malfa and Parri left the party. In March, he participated in the constitution of the Republican Democratic Concentration, which supported the republican referendum in June and contested the related general election. La Malfa and Parri were elected to the Constituent Assembly of Italy, and with the encouragement of Randolfo Pacciardi, they joined the Italian Republican Party, commonly known as the PRI.

He was designated to represent Italy at the International Monetary Fund in 1947 and was named vice president the following year. Meanwhile, with Giulio Andrea Belloni and Oronzo Reale, he assumed the temporary role of party secretary. Reelected to the parliament in 1948, and confirmed in the subsequent legislature, he held numerous positions, including as a "minister without portfolio" charged with reorganizing the Institute for Industrial Reconstruction (IRI), before he was appointed Minister of Foreign Trade in 1951. His work on liberalizing the Italian economy and lowering import tariffs was fundamental to the "economic miracle."

In 1952, he proposed, without success, a "constituent program" between the secular parties. In 1956, while maintaining the Republican Party's autonomy from Marxist economic theories and its position on the left of the political spectrum, he favoured the unification of the three major socialist schools to make the divide between his party and theirs more comprehensible.

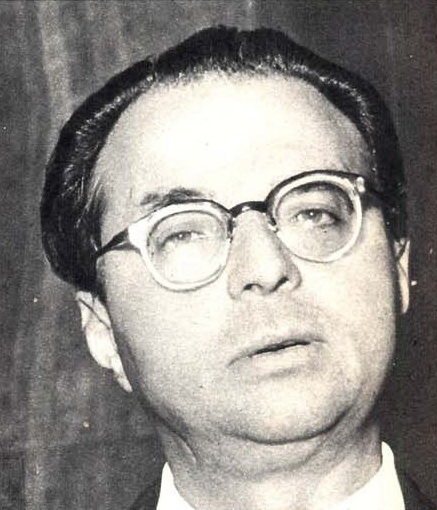
La Malfa in the early 1960s

After the Republicans withdrew support for the government in 1957, Randolfo Pacciardi left as party director. La Malfa assumed direction of the party's newspaper, La Voce Repubblicana, in 1959. In 1962, he was named Minister of the Budget in the first center-left government under Amintore Fanfani, following the socialist abstention. In May, he introduced the Nota Aggiuntiva, in which he supplied a general vision of the state of the Italian economy, including the inequalities which characterized it, and delineated the instruments and objects of their regime. Though criticized for his plan by the Confindustria, the Italian employers' union, he decided to nationalize the electricity industry. On the occasion of the 29th conference of the Republican Party, in March 1965, he was elected party secretary. The following year, he opened a dialogue with the help of his old friend Giorgio Amendola, son of Giovanni Amendola, between the republicans and communists, inviting them to leave behind their old orthodoxy and help develop a more pragmatic approach.

During the tumultuous 1970s, the Republican Party played a small but vital role in determining the government of Italy and maintaining continuity. Following the fall of Mariano Rumor's third government in 1970, La Malfa refused the invitation of incoming Prime Minister Emilio Colombo to take the role of Minister of the Treasury. For him, the government was not able to delineate a strategic plan for financing reforms with their education, health, and transportation services, and Colombo only lasted one year on the job. La Malfa pulled his party out of the subsequent Giulio Andreotti government over the issue of state control of cable television . Asked again in 1973 by Mariano Rumor's fourth government, he accepted the Minister of the Treasury job. In that position, he blocked the request to grant increased emergency financing to Finambro, a bank owned by Michele Sindona, opening the door to the collapse of Sindona's banking empire and his eventual indictment. He resigned in February over fiscal policy disagreements with the Minister of the Budget, pulling the PRI's support for that government and causing its collapse. That December, he was named deputy Prime Minister in the fourth government of his friend Aldo Moro, and in 1975, he assumed the presidency of the Republican Party with Oddo Biasini replacing him as secretary.

The last years of his life were among his most productive. Upon defeating resistance from left-wing republicans in 1976, La Malfa brought the party into the pan-European federation, which later became the European Liberal Democrat and Reform Party. In 1978, his action determined Italy's decision to join the European Monetary System. Following the kidnapping and murder of Aldo Moro, La Malfa gave a tearful and memorable speech in the Chamber of Deputies condemning terrorism and the Red Brigades. Though nominated by President Sandro Pertini as Prime Minister in early 1979, the first secular politician to reach this stage, he could not form a government and later became Deputy Prime Minister and then Minister of the Budget in Giulio Andreotti's second government.

On 24 March 1979, he suffered a cerebral haemorrhage and died two days later in Rome.

== Legacy ==
For many, La Malfa was "the needle" that sewed the Italian republic together and kept it from coming undone, especially because of his role as a peacemaker between contrasting parties. He understood the futility and irresponsibility of governing without the communists, who held upwards of one-third of the seats in parliament. His economic principles, though they often appeared unrealistic and visionary, such as a common European monetary system, were revolutionary and helped make Italy second in economic growth only to West Germany for many years. His commitment to infrastructure within the Mezzogiorno has aided commerce for fifty years.

In Rome, Piazzale Romolo e Remo was renamed Piazzale Ugo La Malfa, and his hometown of Palermo was named Via Ugo La Malfa in his honour.

His son Giorgio La Malfa is president of the PRI and was Minister for European Affairs in Italy until 2006.

== Electoral history ==
Election	House	Constituency	Party	Votes	Result
1946	Constituent Assembly	Italy at-large	PRI	– (Note: Elected in a closed list proportional representation system.)	Elected
1948	Chamber of Deputies	Bologna–Ferrara–Ravenna–Forlì	PRI	11,059	Elected
1953	Chamber of Deputies	Bologna–Ferrara–Ravenna–Forlì	PRI	9,197	Elected
1958	Chamber of Deputies	Bologna–Ferrara–Ravenna–Forlì	PRI	10,457	Elected
1963	Chamber of Deputies	Bologna–Ferrara–Ravenna–Forlì	PRI	18,100	Elected
1968	Chamber of Deputies	Bologna–Ferrara–Ravenna–Forlì	PRI	13,544	Elected
1972	Chamber of Deputies	Rome–Viterbo–Latina–Frosinone	PRI	33,446	Elected
1976	Chamber of Deputies	Rome–Viterbo–Latina–Frosinone	PRI	22,159	Elected

== See also ==
- Italian Republican Party

== Notes ==
- Paolo Soddu, Ugo La Malfa. Il riformista moderno, Carocci, Roma 2008.
