= Italian Republican Party =

Italian political party

Italian Republican Party Partito Repubblicano Italiano
- Abbreviation: PRI
- Secretary: Corrado De Rinaldis Saponaro
- President: Vacant
- Founded: 21 April 1895; 131 years ago
- Split from: Historical Far Left
- Headquarters: Via Euclide Turba, 38; 00186, Rome
- Newspaper: La Voce Repubblicana
- Youth wing: Republican Youth Federation
- Ideology: Liberalism; Historically: Republicanism; Radicalism
- Political position: Centre; Historically: Left-wing
- National affiliation: PpI (1994); Ulivo (1996–1999); Trifoglio (1999–2000); CdL (2001–2006); FI (2006–2008); PdL (2008–2011); SE (2014); ALA (2018) +E (2019); Az–IV (2022); Az (2024)
- European affiliation: ELDR (1976–2010)
- European Parliament group: ELDR (1979–2004)
- Colours: Green
- Chamber of Deputies: 0 / 400
- Senate: 0 / 200
- European Parliament: 0 / 76
- Regional Councils: 0 / 896

Party flag

Website
- www.prinazionale.it

The Italian Republican Party (Italian: Partito Repubblicano Italiano, PRI) is a political party in Italy established in 1895, which makes it the oldest political party still active in the country. The PRI identifies with 19th-century classical radicalism, as well as Mazzinianism, and its modern incarnation is associated with liberalism, social liberalism, and centrism. The PRI has old roots and a long history that began with a left-wing position, being the heir of the Historical Far Left and claiming descent from the political thought of Giuseppe Mazzini and Giuseppe Garibaldi. Within the party there was also a more radical and socialist interpretation of Mazzini's doctrine, because "there were many who believed the teachings of the Genoese patriot could be compatible with the Marxist doctrine and... considered an alliance with the left-wing to be legitimate and desirable". With the rise of the Italian Communist Party and the Italian Socialist Party (PSI) to its left, it was associated with centre-left politics. The early PRI was also known for its anti-clerical, anti-monarchist, republican, and later anti-fascist stances While maintaining those traits, during the second half of the 20th century the party moved towards the centre on the left–right political spectrum, becoming increasingly economically liberal.

After 1949, the PRI was a member of the pro-NATO alliance formed by Christian Democracy (DC), the Italian Democratic Socialist Party, and the Italian Liberal Party (PLI), enabling it to participate in most governments of the 1950s, a period later known as Centrism. In 1963, the party helped bring together DC and PSI in Italy's first centre-left government, the Organic centre-left. Although small in terms of voter support, the PRI was influential thanks to leaders like Eugenio Chiesa, Giovanni Conti, Cipriano Facchinetti, Randolfo Pacciardi, Oronzo Reale, Ugo La Malfa, Bruno Visentini, Oddo Biasini and Giovanni Spadolini. The latter served as Prime Minister of Italy in 1981–1982, the first non Christian Democrat since 1945. From 1976 to 2010, the PRI was a member of the European Liberal Democrat and Reform Party (ELDR), along with the PLI, and the two parties usually ran together in European Parliament elections. After joining the centrist Segni Pact in 1994, the PRI was part of the centre-left coalition from 1996 to 2006, and then of the centre-right coalition from 2008 to 2013 (its leader Giorgio La Malfa was Minister for European Affairs from 2005 to 2006). Afterwards, it ran alone until joining the centrist Action – Italia Viva in 2022.

== History ==
=== Background and foundation ===
The PRI traces its origins from the time of Italian unification and more specifically to the democratic-republican wing represented by figures such as Giuseppe Mazzini, Carlo Cattaneo and Carlo Pisacane. They were against the so-called piemontesizzazione of Italy, meaning the conquest by war of the Kingdom of Sardinia (Piedmont) of the rest of Italy.

After the latter was unified under the Savoy kings, following the political lines of moderates such as Camillo Benso di Cavour, the Republicans remained aside from the political life of the new country, proclaiming their abstention from elections. They created several democratic movements, like the Brotherhood Pact of Workers' Societies, founded by Mazzini in 1871. However, Mazzini's death the following year and internationalism put the Republicans in a difficult position.

In the run-up of the 1880 Italian general election, the Republicans chose to abandon abstentionism. At the time, their ranks included both members of the middle class, such as Giovanni Bovio, Arcangelo Ghisleri and Napoleone Colajanni, as well as the working class, such as Valentino Armirotti. The PRI, whose power base was limited to Romagna, Umbria, Marche, the Tuscan littoral and Lazio, all but Tuscany former Papal States territories, was officially founded in 1895. By the end of the century, the party was allied with the Italian Socialist Party (PSI) and the Italian Radical Party in several local governments, including Milan, Florence and Rome.

=== Early 20th century ===
Pre-fascist style logo

In 1904 the Republican Youth Federation was formed in Terni.

At the outbreak of World War I, the PRI sided with interventionists, aiming at supporting France (considered the motherland of human rights) and annexing Trento and Trieste (then part of Austria-Hungary). After the end of the conflict, the party tried to form an alliance with other left-wing parties, but the attempt failed as the PSI was strongly influenced by its "maximalist" (radical) wing. In 1921, Pietro Nenni left the PRI to become one of the leaders of the PSI. In the 1920s, the rise of the National Fascist Party (PNF) caused the collapse of all Italian left-wing parties, including the PRI, which was banned in 1926.

Several Republicans were arrested, confined or exiled and the PRI collaborated in the anti-fascist struggle. In 1927, the party joined the Anti-fascist Concentration. In the late 1930s, it also participated in the Spanish Civil War. In 1940, the German occupation of France, where many Republicans had taken refuge, put the party in jeopardy. During the armed resistance against the German occupation of Italy from 1943, PRI members were part of the provincial National Liberation Committees (CLN), but they did not participate in the national CLN as they did not want to collaborate with Italian monarchists, some of whom were active members of the committee.

=== Post-World War II ===
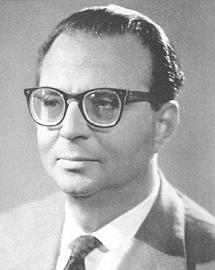
Ugo La Malfa

In 1946, the PRI gained 4.4% of the popular vote in the election for a Constituent Assembly, confirming its traditional strongholds. However, it was very weak if compared to Christian Democracy (DC) and the Italian Communist Party (PCI). After that, a ballot on the same day abolished monarchy in Italy and the PRI declared itself available to take a role in the government of Italy, entering the second government of Alcide De Gasperi. In late 1946, Ugo La Malfa and Ferruccio Parri, formerly members of the Action Party (PdA), moved to the PRI. La Malfa would be appointed as minister in several of the following governments.

At the 19th congress of the party held in 1947, there were two main inner trends: one, represented by the national secretary Randolfo Pacciardi, supported an alliance with the PCI; the other, led by Giovanni Conti and Cipriano Facchinetti, considered the PCI the cause of the government's lack of efficiency. The latter was to prevail. Carlo Sforza, a Republican, was Minister of Foreign Affairs in the De Gasperi III Cabinet, although only as an independent. Sforza signed the treaty of peace and contributed to the entrance of Italy into the Marshall Plan, NATO and the Council of Europe. The exclusion of left-wing parties from the government in 1947 led the PRI to join the De Gasperi IV Cabinet. Pacciardi refused to take a position as minister. As the PCI became ever closer to the Communist Party of the Soviet Union, Pacciardi later changed his mind and became Deputy Prime Minister.

The 1948 Italian general election saw the PRI as a solid ally of the DC, but also a reduction of the party's share to 2.5%. In the following years, the strongest party faction was that of La Malfa, who refused to participate to the DC-led governments until 1962.

In 1963, the party voted in favour of the first centre-left government in Italy led by Aldo Moro. Pacciardi, who had voted against, was expelled and founded a separate movement, Democratic Union for the New Republic (UDNR), whose electoral results were disappointing and whose members had largely returned to the PRI by the late 1960s (although Pacciardi, who received much criticism at this time for his association with coup plotters and neo-fascists, did not come back until after the UDNR was disbanded in 1980). La Malfa was elected national secretary in 1965. The alliance with the DC ended in 1974 when the Republicans left over disagreements on budgetary policy.

=== Pentapartito age ===
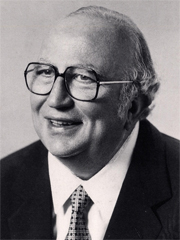
Giovanni Spadolini, first and sole Prime Minister of Italy from the party

In 1979, La Malfa received by President Sandro Pertini the mandate to form a new government. It was the first time for a non-DC member since the Italian Republic had been created. The attempt failed and a new government led by Giulio Andreotti was formed, with La Malfa as Deputy Prime Minister, but he suddenly died five days later. In September, the PRI chose Giovanni Spadolini as national secretary and Bruno Visentini as president. The following twelve years, first under Spadolini and then under La Malfa's son Giorgio, saw the PRI as a stable member of the so-called Pentapartito, an alliance between the DC, the PSI, the PRI, the Italian Liberal Party (PLI) and the Italian Democratic Socialist Party (PSDI) which governed Italy from 1983 to 1991. The PRI abandoned the coalition in 1991 in disagreement with the Mammì bill (named after Oscar Mammì, a Republican) on telecommunications.

In June 1981, Spadolini became Prime Minister of Italy (the first non-Christian Democrat to do so following 1945) and formed a five-party government, the Spadolini I Cabinet. Under Spadolini, an urgent decree outlawing all secret lodges, such as Propaganda Due (which included numerous members of previous governments and of military forces), was approved. The Spadolini II Cabinet fell in November 1983 due to a strife between Beniamino Andreatta (DC) and Rino Formica, Ministers of the Treasury and Finances respectively.

At the 1983 Italian general election, the PRI gained its best result ever (5.1%) thanks to Spadolini's popularity after his stint as Prime Minister and became the third largest party after the DC and the PCI in several Italian cities, notably including Turin. Spadolini was Minister of Defence from 1983 to 1987 under Bettino Craxi (PSI). Following the 1987 Italian general election, Spadolini was elected president of the Senate (an office he would retain until 1994) and was replaced by Giorgio La Malfa as party leader.

=== Diaspora and re-organisation ===
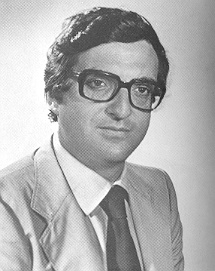
Giorgio La Malfa

The early-1990s Tangentopoli scandals destroyed the party which fell under 1% of the vote, making it dependent on alliances with other parties to survive under the new electoral system based on plurality. In 1992–1994, the PRI lost most of its voters and members. The party was divided in three groups: one led by Giorgio La Malfa joined the Pact for Italy, a second one led by Luciana Sbarbati joined Democratic Alliance (AD) and a third group left the party and formed Republican Left (SR). At the 1994 Italian general election, some PRI members including Sbarbati were elected to the Italian Parliament from the list of AD while Carla Mazzuca were the sole elected with the Segni Pact. At that time, the party seemed quite finished.

Many Republicans, including Jas Gawronski, Guglielmo Castagnetti, Alberto Zorzoli, Luigi Casero, Denis Verdini, Piergiorgio Massidda and Mario Pescante, left the PRI in order to join Forza Italia. Others, mostly affiliated to SR, including Giorgio Bogi, Stefano Passigli, Giuseppe Ayala, Andrea Manzella and Adolfo Battaglia, approached with the Democratic Party of the Left (PDS) and finally merged into the Democrats of the Left (DS) in 1998. Others, notably including Enzo Bianco and Antonio Maccanico, joined Democratic Union (UD), The Democrats (Dem) and finally Democracy is Freedom – The Daisy (DL). The party continued to exist under the leadership of La Malfa, who had been elected MEP for the ELDR Group at the 1994 European Parliament election in Italy and who worked hard to re-organise the party, welcoming back people such as Sbarbati who had left it in the wake of the 1994 general election.

=== From Prodi to Berlusconi ===
From 1996 to 2001, the PRI was part of The Olive Tree centre-left coalition led by Romano Prodi. At the 1996 Italian general election, the party elected two deputies (Giorgio La Malfa and Luciana Sbarbati) and two senators (Antonio Duva and Stelio De Carolis) thanks to the alliance with larger parties. Duva and De Carolis switched to the DS soon after the election, but during the legislature the PRI was joined by three more deputies elected with other parties: Gianantonio Mazzocchin, Giovanni Marongiu (both former DS members) and Luigi Negri (a former member of Lega Nord and Forza Italia). The Republicans were very disappointed by the five years of government of the centre-left and soon became critical supporters of the Prodi I Cabinet as part of The Clover, a centrist parliamentary alliance with the Italian Democratic Socialists (SDI) and the Union for the Republic (UpR). The Clover was responsible for the fall of the D'Alema I Cabinet in December 1999.

At the 2001 Italian general election, the party formed an alliance with Silvio Berlusconi's House of Freedoms and got one deputy (Giorgio La Malfa) and one senator (Antonio Del Pennino) elected. This led two left-wing groups to secede from the party: the European Republicans Movement (MRE), led by Luciana Sbarbati; and the Democratic Republicans, led by Giuseppe Ossorio. The PRI took part to Berlusconi's governments and La Malfa was appointed Minister of European Affairs in the Berlusconi III Cabinet.

At the 2006 Italian general election, Nucara and La Malfa were elected on the Forza Italia's lists for the Chamber of Deputies while the party decided to run under its own banner for the Senate in some regions, obtaining little more than 0.1% of the vote. Del Pennino was elected senator on Forza Italia's list.

At the 2008 Italian general election, the PRI got two deputies elected in the list of The People of Freedom (PdL): La Malfa and Nucara. At time, the party had 12,000 members.

=== Re-unification and recent events ===
The common battle in Parliament against electoral reform favoured a reconciliation between the MRE and the PRI. During the third congress of the MRE in February 2009, the two parties signed a joint declaration under which despite their different coalition allegiances, the two parties pledged to join forces in Parliament on some key issues such as civil liberties and freedom of research. In October, a joint committee was installed in order to reach an agreement of re-unification between the two parties. By February 2011, the MRE and Ossorio's Democratic Republicans reunited with the PRI.

Another split loomed when La Malfa voted against the Berlusconi IV Cabinet and was suspended from the party in December 2010. Moreover, La Malfa along with Sbarbati (MRE) took part to the foundation of the New Pole for Italy (NPI) instead. In May 2011 La Malfa was finally expelled from the party. In June 2011, Del Pennino, who had been a PdL candidate in 2008, returned to the Senate after the death of a PdL senator. In January 2012, Ossorio replaced a Democrat in the Chamber and joined the PRI sub-group. In the 2013 Italian general election, the PRI contested the election locally as a stand-alone list and obtained negligible results.

In December 2013, Nucara resigned from secretary after more than twelve years at the top. He was replaced by two successive coordinators, Saverio Collura (from March 2014, when Nucara was contextually elected president, to December 2015) and Corrado De Rinaldis Saponaro (from January 2016).

In the 2014 European Parliament election in Italy, the PRI supported the European Choice electoral list, which won 0.7% of the vote and failed to elect any MEPs. In April 2016, the party joined forces with Act!, a splinter group from Lega Nord led by Flavio Tosi, whose sub-group in the Mixed Group of the Chamber of Deputies was named Act!–PRI. After Enrico Costa's entry in August 2017, the sub-group was renamed Act!–PRI–Liberals.

In the run-up of the 2018 Italian general election, De Rinaldis Saponaro was elected secretary and an alliance with the Liberal Popular Alliance (ALA) was formed. The PRI–ALA list, which was composed of only Republican candidates, presented its slates in one third of the constituencies and obtained 0.1% of the vote.

In 2019, Giorgio La Malfa was welcomed back into the party's fold. The PRI was part of More Europe (+E) at the 2019 European Parliament election. In 2020, the PRI formed a pact with Action (A), a political party led by Carlo Calenda. In the 2020 Marche regional election, the PRI allied with the centre-right; this caused the European Republicans Movement to again split away from the Party to pursue an alliance with the centre-left.

In 2021 Carlo Cottarelli, a former director of the International Monetary Fund, was chosen by the PRI, A, +E, the Liberal Democratic Alliance for Italy (ALI), and The Liberals to head of a scientific committee designed to elaborate of a joint political program. On the occasion of the 2022 Italian general election, the PRI, after having joined Civic Commitment (an electoral list led by Luigi Di Maio within the centre-left coalition) for a few days, joined forces with the Action – Italia Viva, which ran outside the two main electoral coalitions. The splitaway MRE opted to join the Democratic and Progressive Italy coalition instead.

In 2024 the PRI formed a federative pact with Action.

== Popular support ==
During the Kingdom of Italy, the Republicans along with the other party of the far left, the Italian Radical Party, were strong especially among the rural workers in Romagna, in the Marche and around Rome. In the 1890s, they suffered from competition with the Italian Socialist Party for the single-seat constituencies of Emilia-Romagna, where both parties had their heartlands. However, at the 1900 Italian general election the PRI won 4.3% of the vote (7.3% in Lombardy, 9.6% in Emilia-Romagna, 15.0% in the Marche, 9.6% in Umbria and 7.2% in Apulia) and 29 seats from several regions of Italy, including also Veneto and Sicily, where they had some local strongholds. After that, the Republicans were reduced almost to their power base in Romagna and northern Marche, where the party had more than 40% and where most of their deputies came from. That was why the party lost many seats when proportional representation was introduced in 1919.

At the 1946 Italian general election, despite competition from the Action Party, which had a similar constituency and regional base, the PRI won 4.4% of the vote, with peaks in its traditional strongholds: around 21% in Romagna (32.5% in Forlì and 37.3% in Ravenna), 16.4% in the Marche (26.6% in Ancona and 32.9% in Jesi), 11.0% in Umbria and 15.2% in Lazio. The PRI soon lost its character as a mass party in those areas (although it retained some of its positions there), as the Italian Communist Party conquered many formerly Republican workers' votes and the party settled around 1-2% in the 1950s. However, thanks to its frequent participation in government and leaders like Ugo La Malfa and Giovanni Spadolini, the party re-gained traction.

Especially in the 1970s, under Spadolini, the Republicans gained support among educated middle-class voters, losing some ground in their traditional strongholds, but also increasing their share of vote elsewhere, notably in Piedmont, Lombardy and Liguria, where they became a strong competitor to the Italian Liberal Party for the votes of entrepreneurs and professionals. This led to a gradual recovery in the party's fortunes, which reached their highest peak at the 1983 Italian general election. Spadolini had been Prime Minister of Italy for two years by this point, and the party enjoyed a bounce which led it to the 5.1% of the vote. This time, the PRI did better in Piedmont (7.7%, 10.3% in Turin and 12.8% in Cuneo) and Lombardy (6.9%, 12.3% in Milan) than in Emilia-Romagna (5.1%) and the Marche (4.7%). The party did very well in its local strongholds, such as the Province of Forlì-Cesena (11.3%) and the Province of Ravenna (13.9%).

At the 1992 Italian general election, the last before the Tangentopoli scandals, the PRI won 4.4% of the vote (+0.7% from 1987) and increased its share of vote in the South. With the end of the First Republic, the party was severely diminished in term of votes and retreated to its traditional strongholds and in the South. After that, most Republicans from the Marche left the party to join the European Republicans Movement in 2001, and most Republicans from Campania switched to the Democratic Republicans. The PRI was left only with Romagna (where the local party has long been affiliated to the centre-left, even when the national party was affiliated with the centre-right) and its new heartlands in Calabria and Sicily.

At the 2004 European Parliament election in Italy, the party formed a joint list with the new Italian Liberal Party and won 3.8% of the vote in Calabria, 1.0% in Sicily and 1.0% in Apulia. In 2008, the PRI gained a surprising 9.4% in the provincial election of Messina, Sicily. In Romagna, where it always retained its alliance with the centre-left, the party won the 4.2% of the vote in the provincial election of Forlì-Cesena in 2004 and 3.8% in Ravenna in 2006; and 6.1% in the Ravenna municipal election. In the 2011 local elections, the party was almost stable in Ravenna and its province (5.1% and 3.1%, respectively) and in Reggio Calabria and its province (3.1% and 4.1%), but it gained some ground in Naples (1.5%). In the 2012 municipal elections, the party won 6.5% in Brindisi. Later on, in municipal elections in Ravenna the party confirmed its strength with 4.4% in 2016, 5.2% in 2021 and 4.2% in 2025.

The electoral results of the PRI in general elections (Chamber of Deputies) from 1897 to 1992 are shown in the chart below.

- Kingdom of Italy
View source data.
- Italian Republic
View source data.

== Election results ==
=== Italian Parliament ===
Election	Leader	Chamber of Deputies					Senate of the Republic				
Election	Leader	Votes	%	Seats	+/–	Position	Votes	%	Seats	+/–	Position
1897	Giovanni Bovio	60,833 (Note: Estimate)	5.0	25 / 508	–	4th	No election				
1900	Napoleone Colajanni	79,127	6.2	29 / 508	▲4	▼5th	No election				
1904	Napoleone Colajanni	75,225	4.9	24 / 508	▼5	5th	No election				
1909	Napoleone Colajanni	81,461	4.4	23 / 508	▼1	5th	No election				
1913	Napoleone Colajanni	102,102	2.0	8 / 508	▼15	▼7th	No election				
1919	Salvatore Barzilai	53,197	0.9	9 / 508	▲1	▼10th	No election				
1921	Eugenio Chiesa	124,924	1.9	6 / 535	▼3	▲8th	No election				
1924	Eugenio Chiesa	133,714	1.9	7 / 535	▲1	▼9th	No election				
1929	Cipriano Facchinetti	Banned		0 / 535	▼7	–	No election				
1934	Randolfo Pacciardi	Banned		0 / 535	0	–	No election				
1946	Randolfo Pacciardi	1,003,007	4.4	23 / 556	▲23	▲6th	No election				
1948	Randolfo Pacciardi	651,875	2.5	9 / 574	▼14	6th	594,178 (Note: Two senators were elected in joint lists with the PSDI.)	2.6	6 / 237	–	▲6th
1953	Oronzo Reale	438,149	1.6	5 / 590	▼4	▼8th	261,713	1.1	0 / 237	▼6	▼8th
1958	Oronzo Reale	405,782	1.4	6 / 596	▲1	▼9th	363,462	1.4	0 / 246	0	▼8th
1963	Oronzo Reale	420,213	1.4	6 / 630	0	▲8th	223,350	0.8	1 / 315	0	▲8th
1968	Ugo La Malfa	626,533	2.0	9 / 630	▲3	▲7th	622,388	2.2	2 / 315	▲2	▲7th
1972	Ugo La Malfa	954,357	2.9	15 / 630	▲6	7th	918,440	3.0	5 / 315	▲3	7th
1976	Oddo Biasini	1,135,546	3.1	14 / 630	▼1	▲6th	846,415	2.7	7 / 315	▲2	▲6th
1979	Oddo Biasini	1,110,209	3.0	16 / 630	▲2	▼7th	1,053,251	3.4	6 / 315	▼1	▼7th
1983	Giovanni Spadolini	1,874,512	5.1	29 / 630	▲13	▲5th	1,452,279	4.7	11 / 315	▲5	▲5th
1987	Giovanni Spadolini	1,428,663	3.7	21 / 630	▼8	5th	1,248,641	3.9	8 / 315	▼3	5th
1992	Giorgio La Malfa	1,722,465	4.4	27 / 630	▲6	▼7th	1,565,142	4.5	10 / 315	▲2	▼7th
1994	Giorgio La Malfa	Into Segni Pact		1 / 630	▼26	–	Into Pact for Italy		0 / 315	▼10	–
1996	Giorgio La Malfa	Into the Populars		2 / 630	▲1	–	Into the Olive Tree		0 / 315	0	–
2001	Giorgio La Malfa	Into Forza Italia		1 / 630	▼1	–	Into Forza Italia		1 / 315	▲1	–
2006	Francesco Nucara	Into Forza Italia		2 / 630	▲1	–	45,098 (Note: Senator elected with Forza Italia.)	0.13	1 / 315	0	▲24th
2008	Francesco Nucara	Into People of Freedom		2 / 630	0	–	Into People of Freedom (Note: In 2011, a Republican replaced a senator of the People of Freedom.)		0 / 315	▼1	–
2013	Francesco Nucara	7,143	0.02	0 / 630	▼2	▲21st	8,476	0.02	0 / 315	0	▲21st
2018	Corrado De Rinaldis Saponaro	20,943 (Note: In a joint list with Liberal Popular Alliance.)	0.06	0 / 630	0	▲20th	27,285 (Note: In a joint list with Liberal Popular Alliance.)	0.09	0 / 315	0	▲20th
2022	Corrado De Rinaldis Saponaro	Into Action – Italia Viva		0 / 400	0	–	Into Action – Italia Viva		0 / 200	0	–

=== European Parliament ===
Election	Leader	Votes	%	Seats	+/–	EP Group
1979	Oddo Biasini	896,139 (8th)	2.56	2 / 81	New	LD
1984 (Note: Run in a joint list with PLI.)	Giovanni Spadolini	2,140,501 (5th)	6.09	2 / 81	0	LDR
1989 (Note: Run in a joint list with PLI and Federalists.)	Giorgio La Malfa	1,532,388 (5th)	4.40	3 / 81	▲1	LDR
1994	Giorgio La Malfa	242,786 (12th)	0.74	1 / 87	▼2	ELDR
1999 (Note: Run in a joint list with FdL.)	Giorgio La Malfa	168,620 (18th)	0.54	1 / 87	0	ELDR
2004 (Note: Run in a joint list with LS.)	Giorgio La Malfa	233,144 (16th)	0.72	0 / 78	▼1	–
2009	Did not contest			0 / 72	0	–
2014	Francesco Nucara	Into European Choice		0 / 73	0	–
2019	Corrado De Rinaldis Saponaro	Into More Europe		0 / 76	0	–
2024	Corrado De Rinaldis Saponaro	Into Action		0 / 76	0	–

=== Regional elections ===
Regions of Italy
Election year	Votes	%	Seats	+/−	Leader
1970	787,011 (8th)	2.9	18 / 720	–	Ugo La Malfa
1975	961,797 (6th)	3.2	19 / 720	▲1	Giovanni Spadolini
1980	922,970 (6th)	3.0	18 / 720	▼1	Giovanni Spadolini
1985	1,280,563 (5th)	4.0	25 / 720	▲7	Giovanni Spadolini
1990	1,139,590 (6th)	3.6	21 / 720	▼4	Giorgio La Malfa

== Leadership (since 1945) ==
- Secretary: Randolfo Pacciardi (1945–1949), Oronzo Reale (1949–1964), Oddo Biasini/Claudio Salmoni/Emanuele Terrana (1964–1965), Ugo La Malfa (1965–1975), Oddo Biasini (1975–1979), Giovanni Spadolini (1979–1987), Giorgio La Malfa (1987–1993), Giorgio Bogi (1993–1994), Giorgio La Malfa (1994–2001), Francesco Nucara (2001–2013), Saverio Collura (coordinator; 2014–2015), Corrado De Rinaldis Saponaro (2016–present, coordinator 2016–2017)
- President: Oronzo Reale (1965–1975), Ugo La Malfa (1975–1979), Bruno Visentini (1979–1992), Guglielmo Negri (1995–2000), Giorgio La Malfa (2001–2006), Francesco Nucara (2014–2016)
- Party Leader in the Chamber of Deputies: Randolfo Pacciardi (1946–1947), Cipriano Facchinetti (1947), Cino Macrelli (1947–1948), unknown (1948–1953), Cino Macrelli (1953–1962), Oronzo Reale (1962–1963), Ugo La Malfa (1963–1973), Oronzo Reale (1973–1974), Oddo Biasini (1974–1979), Oscar Mammì (1979–1981), Adolfo Battaglia (1981–1987), Antonio Del Pennino (1987–1993), Giuseppe Galasso (1993), Alfredo Bianchini (1993–1994), Luciana Sbarbati (1994–2001), Giorgio La Malfa (2001–2006), Francesco Nucara (2006–2013)

== See also ==
- Liberalism and radicalism in Italy
