= Oddo Biasini =

Italian politician (1917–2009)

Oddo Biasini OMRI
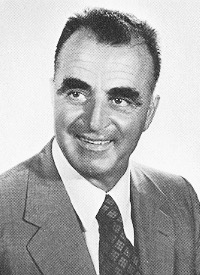
- Biasini in 1976

Minister of Cultural and Environmental Heritage
- In office 4 April 1980 – 28 June 1981
- Prime Minister: Francesco Cossiga; Arnaldo Forlani
- Preceded by: Egidio Ariosto
- Succeeded by: Vincenzo Scotti

Secretary of the Italian Republican Party
- In office February 1975 – September 1979
- Preceded by: Ugo La Malfa
- Succeeded by: Giovanni Spadolini
- In office January 1964 – April 1965
- Preceded by: Oronzo Reale
- Succeeded by: Ugo La Malfa

Member of the Chamber of Deputies
- In office 5 June 1968 – 1 July 1987
- Constituency: Bologna

Personal details
- Born: 13 May 1917 Cesena, Italy
- Died: 8 July 2009 (aged 92) Cesena, Italy
- Party: Italian Republican Party
- Children: 3
- Education: University of Florence
- Profession: Politician, teacher

Oddo Biasini (13 May 1917 – 8 July 2009) was an Italian politician. He was a partisan during the Second World War and a prominent member of the Italian Republican Party.

== Biography ==
Biasini graduated in letters at the University of Florence in 1940; in 1944 he was a republican partisan together with Libero Gualtieri and Osvaldo Abbondanza. After the war he worked as a teacher of Italian and Latin and was principal of the scientific high school of Cesena from 1958 to 1968.

A trusted man of Ugo La Malfa, in the 1970s he was elected national secretary of the Italian Republican Party. He was the chairman of his party's parliamentary group from 16 December 1974 to 24 February 1976 and from 15 July 1976 to 19 June 1979 and vice-president of the Chamber of Deputies from 1983 to 1987.

Between the end of the 1960s and the beginning of the 1970s, he served as an undersecretary for public education in the first (1968–69) and third Rumor Cabinet (1970) and in the Colombo Cabinet (1970–71).

He also served as a minister of cultural and environmental heritage from 1980 to 1981 in the Cossiga II Cabinet and Forlani Cabinet.

He died on 8 July 2009.

== Electoral history ==
| Election | House | Constituency | Party | Votes | Result |
|---|---|---|---|---|---|
| 1968 | Chamber of Deputies | Bologna–Ferrara–Ravenna–Forlì | PRI | 12,557 | Elected |
| 1972 | Chamber of Deputies | Bologna–Ferrara–Ravenna–Forlì | PRI | 16,404 | Elected |
| 1976 | Chamber of Deputies | Bologna–Ferrara–Ravenna–Forlì | PRI | 17,957 | Elected |
| 1979 | Chamber of Deputies | Bologna–Ferrara–Ravenna–Forlì | PRI | 16,830 | Elected |
| 1983 | Chamber of Deputies | Bologna–Ferrara–Ravenna–Forlì | PRI | 11,458 | Elected |

== Honours and awards ==
- Italy: Grand Cross Knight of the Order of Merit of the Italian Republic (12 December 1993)
- Italy: Gold Medal for the Meritorious of Culture and Art (5 August 1983)
- Italy: Gold Medal for the Meritorious of the School of Culture and Art (31 July 1973)
