= Bruno Visentini =

Italian politician (1914–1995)

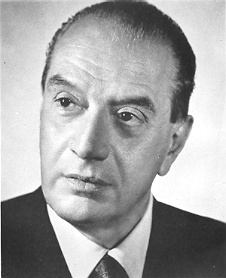
Bruno Visentini

Bruno Visentini (1 August 1914 – 13 February 1995) was an Italian politician, senator, minister, lecturer and industrialist.

== Biography ==
Visentini was born in Treviso.

He graduated in law from Padua University and joined several anti-fascist student associations. In early 1943, he was arrested for being a partisan and released after 25 July, the day of Benito Mussolini's resignation. While in prison, Visentini would ask his wife to bring food and clothes for all his cellmates, as well as various books to remain occupied and mentally stimulated. He was the co-founder of the Action Party (Partito d'Azione) with Ugo La Malfa, and took part in the resistance against the German occupation in Veneto and in Rome.

In 1946, he abandoned the Action Party and joined the Italian Republican Party (PRI). He was also appointed professor at the University of Urbino. In December 1945, Visentini was nominated undersecretary for the Minister of Finance in Alcide De Gasperi's first cabinet. In 1950, he became vice-president of the Institute for Industrial Reconstruction (IRI), a position he held until 1970; while at IRI, he was chairman of Olivetti (1963–1982, with a short interruption).

In the 1972 election, Visentini was elected as a Member of Parliament for the PRI. Two years later, he was elected vice-president of Confederation of Italian Industry (Confindustria), but on 23 November, he resigned to become Minister of Finance in Aldo Moro's fourth government, during which he launched a program of reforms of the fiscal system. In the 1976 election, Visentini was elected Senator, and in 1979 he became Minister for the Budget in Giulio Andreotti's fifth government (after Ugo La Malfa's death) until he resigned the following July. He was again Minister of Finance when Bettino Craxi held tenure as Italian Prime Minister in the 1980s.

He was president of his party from 1979 to 1992, Member of the European Parliament twice (elected in 1979 and 1989), and also re-elected Senator in the 1983, 1987 and 1992 general elections. Later, he left the PRI and was again elected to the Italian Senate in the 1994 general election, as a member of the Alliance of Progressives led by Achille Occhetto.

Visentini died in Rome in 1995.

Political offices
Preceded by Mario Tanassi	Minister of Finance; 1974–1976	Succeeded by Gaetano Stammati
Preceded by Ugo La Malfa	Minister for Budget; 1979	Succeeded by Beniamino Andreatta
Preceded by Francesco Forte	Minister of Finance; 1983–1987	Succeeded by Giuseppe Guarino
