= Giorgio La Malfa =

Italian politician (born 1939)

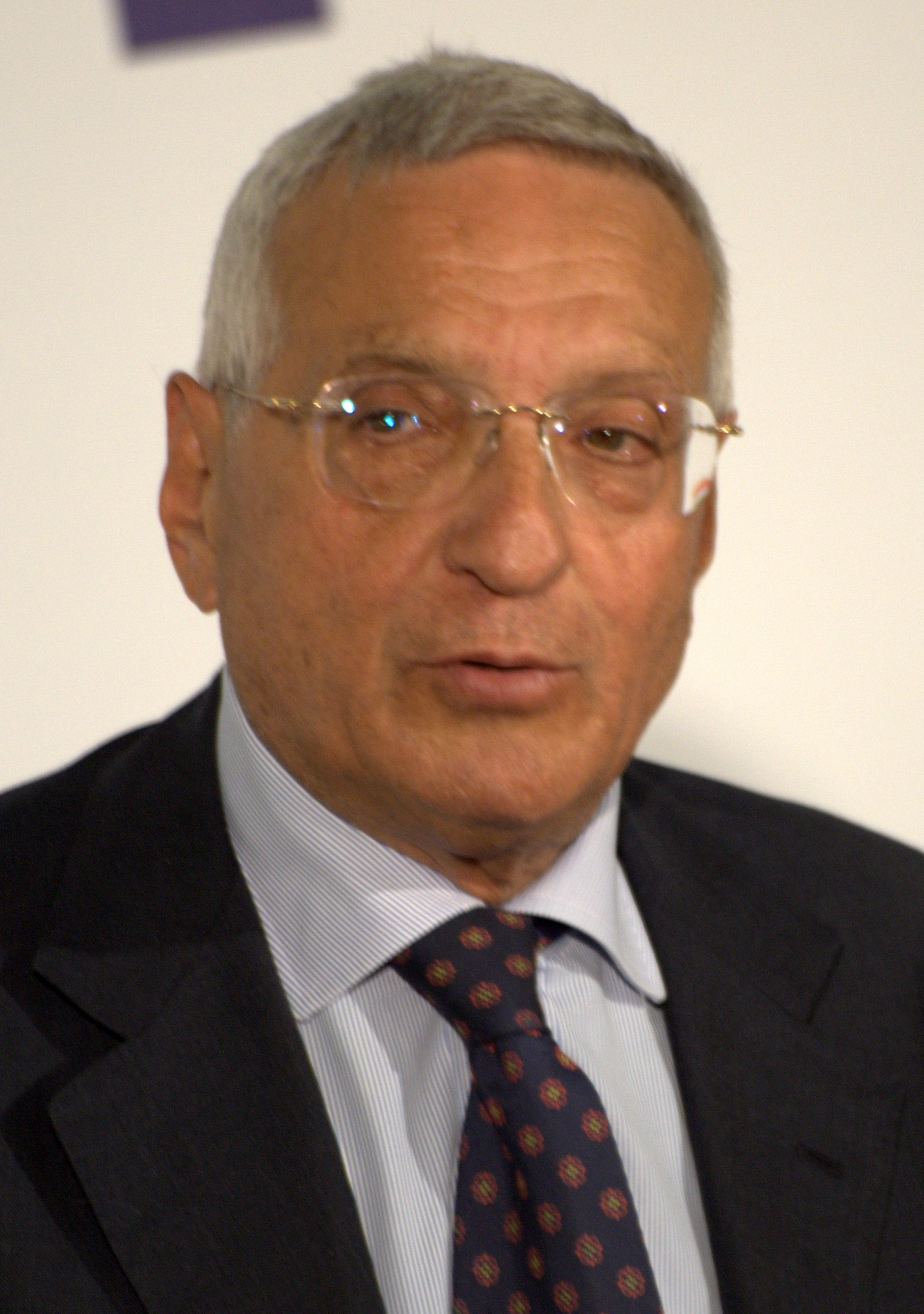

Minister of European Affairs
- In office 23 April 2005 – 17 May 2006
- Prime Minister: Silvio Berlusconi
- Preceded by: Rocco Buttiglione
- Succeeded by: Emma Bonino

Minister of Budget and Economic Planning
- In office 4 April 1980 – 1 December 1982
- Prime Minister: Francesco Cossiga; Arnaldo Forlani; Giovanni Spadolini
- Preceded by: Beniamino Andreatta
- Succeeded by: Guido Bodrato

Member of the Chamber of Deputies
- In office 9 May 1996 – 14 March 2013
- Constituency: Mirano (1996–2001); Emilia-Romagna (2001–2006); Marche (2006–2013)
- In office 25 May 1972 – 14 April 1994
- Constituency: Turin (1972–1992); Milan (1992–1994)

Member of the European Parliament
- In office 20 July 1994 – 19 July 1999
- Constituency: Central Italy

Personal details
- Born: 13 October 1939 (age 86) Milan, Italy
- Party: PRI (1972–2011; 2019–present)
- Education: University of Pavia; St John's College, Cambridge
- Profession: Politician, University professor

Giorgio La Malfa (born 13 October 1939) is an Italian politician.

== Biography ==
La Malfa was born on 13 October 1939 in Milan, the son of Ugo La Malfa, a long-time Italian political leader and government minister. He read law at the University of Pavia and the economics tripos at St John's College, Cambridge, before working as a research fellow in economics at the Massachusetts Institute of Technology, where he co-authored a paper on the Italian economy with Franco Modigliani. Upon returning to Italy in 1966, he taught political economy at the University of Catania in Sicily.

La Malfa served as secretary of the Italian Republican Party (PRI) from 1987 to 1993, when he stood down and was indicted to face trial over a corruption scandal. He returned to politics in 1994, and has since 2001 been president of the party. From 2001 to 2005, he was President of the Finances Commission of the Italian Chamber of Deputies. He was Italian minister for European Union Affairs from April 2005 until the elections of April 2006, when the centre-right coalition lost its majority; La Malfa was nonetheless elected to Parliament. La Malfa was re-elected to the Chamber in the 2008 Italian general election with The People of Freedom, but on 24 September 2009, he announced his detachment from the Berlusconi IV Cabinet through a letter published by Corriere della Sera.

On 8 June 2011, he was expelled from PRI by the party's college of arbitrators, for having voted against the Berlusconi Cabinet on 14 December 2010. He was readmitted into the party in March 2019.

In 2015, he was a Visiting Fellow at Nuffield College, Oxford. Since 2018, he has been the president of the Ugo La Malfa Foundation. He regularly writes for Il Mattino and Quotidiano Nazionale. He also contributes to Aspenia, the Italian magazine of the Aspen Institute.

== Electoral history ==
Election	House	Constituency	Party	Votes	Result
1972	Chamber of Deputies	Turin–Novara–Vercelli	PRI	9,006	Elected
1976	Chamber of Deputies	Turin–Novara–Vercelli	PRI	15,279	Elected
1979	Chamber of Deputies	Turin–Novara–Vercelli	PRI	16,693	Elected
1983	Chamber of Deputies	Turin–Novara–Vercelli	PRI	26,497	Elected
1987	Chamber of Deputies	Turin–Novara–Vercelli	PRI	16,481	Elected
1992	Chamber of Deputies	Milan–Pavia	PRI	48,472	Elected
1994	European Parliament	Central Italy	PRI	15,598	Elected
1996	Chamber of Deputies	Mirano	Ulivo	34,916	Elected
2001	Chamber of Deputies	Emilia-Romagna at-large	FI	– (Note: Elected in a closed list proportional representation system.)	Elected
2006	Chamber of Deputies	Marche at-large	FI	– (Note: Elected in a closed list proportional representation system.)	Elected
2008	Chamber of Deputies	Marche at-large	PdL	– (Note: Elected in a closed list proportional representation system.)	Elected

== Bibliography ==
- Le innovazioni nella teoria dello sviluppo (1970)
- L'Italia al bivio, ristagno o sviluppo (1985, with E. Grilli and P. Savona)
- Le ragioni di una svolta (1992, with G. Turani)
- L'Europa legata: i rischi dell'euro (2000)
