= Oronzo Reale =

Italian politician (1902–1988)

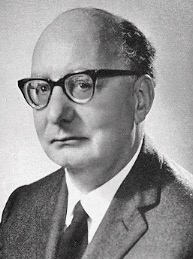

Minister of Justice
- In office 23 November 1974 – 12 February 1976
- Prime Minister: Aldo Moro
- Preceded by: Mario Zagari
- Succeeded by: Francesco Paolo Bonifacio
- In office 27 March 1970 – 6 March 1971
- Prime Minister: Mariano Rumor; Emilio Colombo
- Preceded by: Silvio Gava
- Succeeded by: Emilio Colombo
- In office 4 December 1963 – 24 June 1968
- Prime Minister: Aldo Moro
- Preceded by: Giacinto Bosco
- Succeeded by: Guido Gonella

Minister of Finance
- In office 12 December 1968 – 5 August 1969
- Prime Minister: Mariano Rumor
- Preceded by: Mario Ferrari Aggradi
- Succeeded by: Giacinto Bosco
Judiciary offices
Judge of the Constitutional Court of Italy
In office 31 January 1977 – 31 January 1986
Appointed by	Italian Parliament
Party political offices
Secretary of the Italian Republican Party
In office February 1949 – December 1963
Preceded by	Amedeo Sommivigo
Succeeded by	Oddo Biasini
Parliamentary offices
Member of the Chamber of Deputies
In office 12 June 1958 – 4 July 1976
Constituency	Ancona

Personal details
- Born: 24 October 1902 Lecce, Kingdom of Italy
- Died: 14 July 1988 (aged 85) Rome, Italy
- Party: Italian Republican Party

Oronzo Reale (24 October 1902 – 14 July 1988) was an Italian politician, who served as justice minister in the 1960s and 1970s.

== Biography ==
Reale was born in Lecce on 24 October 1902. He received a degree in law.

He was a member and the head of the Republican Party. He served as the secretary of the party. In the 1970s he tried the French model to reorganize the party for which he set up a committee.

Reale also assumed cabinet posts. On 4 December 1963, he became justice minister of Italy. He was reappointed justice minister to the coalition government led by Prime Minister Aldo Moro on 24 February 1966. His term ended on 24 June 1968. Then Reale served as the minister of finance from 12 December 1968 to 5 August 1969.

He was secondly appointed justice minister on 27 March 1970 and served in the post until March 1971. His third and last term as justice minister was from 23 November 1974 to 12 February 1976. During his third term as justice minister, Reale developed a public law order, called Legge Reale or more formally public law order 152 which was introduced on 22 May 1975 as a response to bombings organized by right-wing groups in Brescia. The law expanded the powers of Italian security forces.

Reale died on 14 July 1988, aged 85.

== Electoral history ==
Election	House	Constituency	Party	Votes	Result
1958	Chamber of Deputies	Ancona–Pesaro–Macerata–Ascoli	PRI	6,863	Elected
1963	Chamber of Deputies	Ancona–Pesaro–Macerata–Ascoli	PRI	5,710	Elected
1968	Chamber of Deputies	Ancona–Pesaro–Macerata–Ascoli	PRI	7,538	Elected
1972	Chamber of Deputies	Ancona–Pesaro–Macerata–Ascoli	PRI	8,918	Elected
