= First Cossiga government =

36th government of the Italian Republic

Cossiga I Cabinet
- 36th Cabinet of Italy

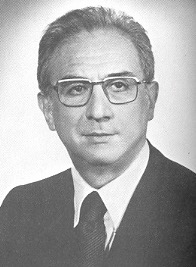
- Date formed: 5 August 1979
- Date dissolved: 4 April 1980

People and organisations
- Head of state: Sandro Pertini
- Head of government: Francesco Cossiga
- Member parties: DC, PSDI, PLI; Abstention: PSI, PRI
- Status in legislature: Coalition government
- Opposition parties: PCI, MSI, PR, PdUP

History
- Election: 1979 election
- Legislature term: VIII Legislature (1979–1983)
- Predecessor: Andreotti V Cabinet
- Successor: Cossiga II Cabinet

The Cossiga I Cabinet, led by Francesco Cossiga, was the 36th cabinet of the Italian Republic.

Cossiga resigned on 19 March 1980 and was re-appointed to form a second government.

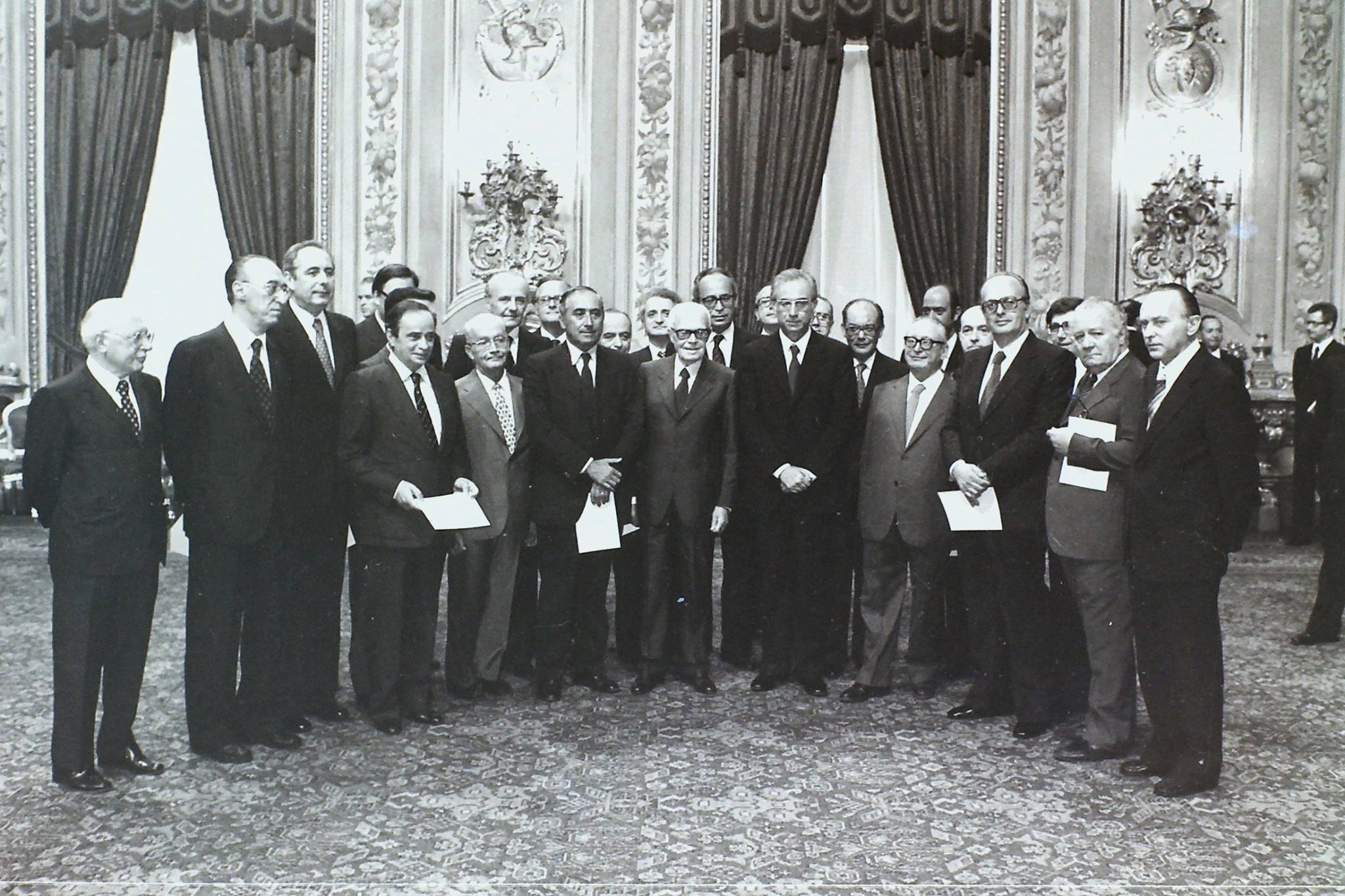
The Cossiga Cabinet at the Quirinal Palace for the official portrait.

== Party breakdown ==
- Christian Democracy (DC): prime minister, 17 ministers, 38 undersecretaries
- Italian Democratic Socialist Party (PSDI): 3 ministers, 6 undersecretaries
- Italian Liberal Party (PLI): 2 ministers, 2 undersecretaries
- Independents (PSI area): 2 ministers, 1 undersecretary

== Composition ==
Portfolio	Minister	Took office	Left office	Party
Prime Minister	Francesco Cossiga	5 August 1979	4 April 1980	DC
Minister of Foreign Affairs	Franco Maria Malfatti	5 August 1979	14 January 1980	DC
Minister of Foreign Affairs	Attilio Ruffini	14 January 1980	4 April 1980	DC
Minister of the Interior	Virginio Rognoni	5 August 1979	4 April 1980	DC
Minister of Grace and Justice	Tommaso Morlino	5 August 1979	4 April 1980	DC
Minister of Budget and Economic Planning	Beniamino Andreatta	5 August 1979	4 April 1980	DC
Minister of Finance	Franco Reviglio	5 August 1979	4 April 1980	PSI
Minister of Treasury	Filippo Maria Pandolfi	5 August 1979	4 April 1980	DC
Minister of Defence	Attilio Ruffini	5 August 1979	14 January 1980	DC
Minister of Defence	Adolfo Sarti	14 January 1980	4 April 1980	DC
Minister of Public Education	Salvatore Valitutti	5 August 1979	4 April 1980	PLI
Minister of Public Works	Franco Nicolazzi	5 August 1979	4 April 1980	PSDI
Minister of Agriculture and Forests	Giovanni Marcora	5 August 1979	4 April 1980	DC
Minister of Transport	Luigi Preti	5 August 1979	4 April 1980	PSDI
Minister of Post and Telecommunications	Vittorino Colombo	5 August 1979	4 April 1980	DC
Minister of Industry, Commerce and Craftsmanship	Antonio Bisaglia	5 August 1979	4 April 1980	DC
Minister of Health	Renato Altissimo	5 August 1979	4 April 1980	PLI
Minister of Foreign Trade	Gaetano Stammati	5 August 1979	4 April 1980	DC
Minister of Merchant Navy	Franco Evangelisti	5 August 1979	4 March 1980	DC
Minister of Merchant Navy	Nicola Signorello	4 March 1980	4 April 1980	DC
Minister of State Holdings	Siro Lombardini	5 August 1979	4 April 1980	DC
Minister of Labour and Social Security	Vincenzo Scotti	5 August 1979	4 April 1980	DC
Minister of Cultural and Environmental Heritage	Egidio Ariosto	5 August 1979	4 April 1980	PSDI
Minister of Tourism and Entertainment	Bernardo D'Arezzo	5 August 1979	4 April 1980	DC
Minister for the Coordination of Scientific and Technological Research Initiatives (without portfolio)	Vito Scalia	5 August 1979	4 April 1980	DC
Minister of Public Function (without portfolio)	Massimo Severo Giannini	5 August 1979	4 April 1980	PSI
Minister for Extraordinary Interventions in the South (without portfolio)	Michele Di Giesi	5 August 1979	4 April 1980	PSDI
Minister for Parliamentary Relations (without portfolio)	Adolfo Sarti	5 August 1979	14 January 1980	DC
Minister for Parliamentary Relations (without portfolio)	Clelio Darida	14 January 1980	4 April 1980	DC
Secretary of the Council of Ministers	Piergiorgio Bressani	5 August 1979	4 April 1980	DC
