= Pentapartito =

Italian party system (1981–1991)

- Leaders: Giulio Andreotti; Bettino Craxi; Arnaldo Forlani
- Founded: 1981
- Dissolved: 1991
- Preceded by: Organic centre-left (1963–1976); Historic Compromise (1976–1979)
- Succeeded by: Quadripartito (1991–1993)
- Headquarters: Rome
- Ideology: Christian democracy Social liberalism
- Political position: Centre

The Pentapartito (from Greek πέντε, "five", and Italian partito, "party"), commonly shortened to CAF from the initials of Bettino Craxi, Giulio Andreotti, and Arnaldo Forlani, was the coalition government of five Italian political parties that formed between June 1981 and April 1991. The pro-European and Atlanticist coalition comprised the Christian Democracy (DC), the Italian Socialist Party (PSI), the Italian Democratic Socialist Party (PSDI), the Italian Liberal Party (PLI), and the Italian Republican Party (PRI).

As a proper coalition, the Pentapartito was the successor of the organic centre-left that was born in 1963 and governed much of the 1960s. The new coalition that would dominated the 1980s and early 1990s was formed following the end of the Historic Compromise between the DC and the Italian Communist Party (PCI) that led two national solidarity governments between 1976 and 1979. In 1991, with the exit of the PRI, the same coalition formally evolved into the Quadripartito and was the last party system of the First Italian Republic, which would be marked by the judicial revolution of Mani pulite.

== History ==
=== New majority ===
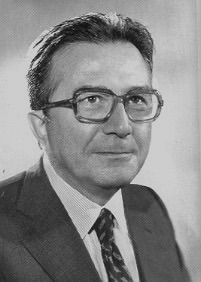
Giulio Andreotti

The Pentapartito began in 1981 at a meeting of the congress of the PSI when Craxi and Forlani, respectively the PSI secretary and prominent DC leader, signed an agreement with the blessing of Andreotti. As the agreement was signed in a trailer, it was called the "pact of the camper". The pact was also called "CAF" for the initials of the signers. With this agreement, the DC recognised the equal dignity of the "secular parties" of the majority (the PSI, the PSDI, the PLI, and the PRI) and also guaranteed an alternation of government, which had been one of the objective of Aldo Moro with the Historic Compromise with the PCI, as Giovanni Spadolini of the PRI and Craxi of the PSI became the first non-DC members to became Prime Minister of Italy.

With the birth of the Pentapartito, the possibility of the growth of the majority toward the PCI was finally dismissed. The DC remained the leaders of the coalition and managed several times to prevent representatives of the secular parties from becoming prime minister; for example, Ciriaco De Mita was opposed by a continuous veto against Craxi. Others argue that the "pact of the camper" was only stipulated in 1989 between Craxi, Forlani, and Andreotti in a parking lot of Ansaldo in Milan, where the congress of the PSI took place. The pact would have provided a path that would have started with the fall of the De Mita government and the formation of a cabinet with a social-democrat-led transition, culminating in another Craxi's government, when it would release the armchair of the Quirinal Palace where the investiture is scheduled or of Andreotti and Forlani. In July 1989, Eugenio Scalfari defined it "an agreement of a regime".

=== Quadripartito and Tangentopoli ===
The Pentapartito coalition ended in 1991 when the PRI withdrew its support from the coalition over its failure to be given the Ministry of Communications. On 29 March 1991, the five-party sixth Andreotti government cabinet was replaced with the four-party (hence named Quadripartito) seventh Andreotti government, which lasted until 24 April 1992. This ruling coalition represented the twilight period of the First Republic in Italy, as it ended with the Mani pulite investigation conducted by the Prosecutor's Office in Milan, involving numerous politicians and almost all the national leaders of the parties that made up the Pentapartito: Andreotti (DC), Forlani (DC), De Mita (DC), Paolo Cirino Pomicino (DC), Craxi (PSI), Renato Altissimo (PLI), Francesco De Lorenzo (PLI), Giorgio La Malfa (PRI), and many others, with the notable exception of Spadolini.

This phase of Italian democracy is known as Tangentopoli. After the 1992 Italian general election, the Quadripartito remained in power under the first Amato government, although Prime Minister Giuliano Amato resigned on 28 April 1993 and subsequently Oscar Luigi Scalfaro, the President of Italy, appointed the Bank of Italy governed Carlo Azeglio Ciampi as the new prime minister, with the mandate to deal with the serious economic crisis and rewrite the electoral law. An electoral law, best known as Mattarellum from its author Sergio Mattarella (elected President of Italy in 2015 and re-elected in 2021), that moved away the pure proportional representation system to a majoritarian and mixed electoral system was passed in predominantly majority in both the Chamber of Deputies and the Senate of the Republic. The Ciampi government, a de facto transitional government also described as a technocratic government, the called for elections in order to locate the repositioning of the parties in the light of new electoral legislation, which was still applied only in 1996 and for the last time in 2001.

=== Successor parties ===
The unofficial successor of the Pentapartito was the Pact for Italy (PpI), the centrist coalition led by Mario Segni (the 'Patto Segni'), the Italian People's Party (PPI) of Mino Martinazzoli, inheritors of the DC, the PRI of La Malfa, and the Liberal Democratic Union (Unione Liberaldemocratica, ULD) of Valerio Zanone. In the 1994 Italian general election, the PPI reached 11.07%, the Segni Pact with the PRI and the Federation of Liberals (the successor of PLI) reached 4.68%, the PSI reached 2.19%, and the PSDI reached 0.46%.

== Ideology ==
The Pentapartito was a collection of parties from the centre-left to the centre-right, which opposed both the PCI on the left and the neo-fascist Italian Social Movement (MSI) on the right. Despite having the character of a secular coalition and far more tending to the left, especially during the PLI leadership of Zanone that led to a Lib-Lab coalition-style between the PSI and the PLI and to the two Craxi governments, the alliance underwent conservative influences both from some small groups of the DC and from the PLI under the more conservative Alfredo Biondi and Renato Altissimo. The PSI had strong social democratic, Keynesian, and liberal socialist majority groups; some factions had less libertarian ideas on issues such as drugs (the war on drugs of Craxi). Internationally, the Pentapartito relied on a strong pro-Europeanism and Atlanticism from a pro-Arab policy (Craxi and Andreotti). This fact caused many frictions between the PSI and the PLI, and was one of the causes of disintegration of the coalition.

== Composition ==
=== 1981–1991 (Pentapartito) ===
Party	Main ideology	Political spectrum	Leaders
Christian Democracy	Christian democracy	Centre	Giulio Andreotti, Arnaldo Forlani
Italian Socialist Party	Social democracy	Centre-left	Bettino Craxi
Italian Democratic Socialist Party	Social democracy	Centre-left	Pietro Longo, Franco Nicolazzi
Italian Republican Party	Social liberalism	Centre	Giovanni Spadolini, Giorgio La Malfa
Italian Liberal Party	Conservative liberalism	Centre-right	Valerio Zanone, Alfredo Biondi, Renato Altissimo

=== 1991–1993 (Quadripartito) ===
Party	Main ideology	Political spectrum	Leaders
Christian Democracy	Christian democracy	Centre	Giulio Andreotti, Arnaldo Forlani
Italian Socialist Party	Social democracy	Centre-left	Bettino Craxi
Italian Democratic Socialist Party	Social democracy	Centre-left	Franco Nicolazzi
Italian Liberal Party	Conservative liberalism	Centre-right	Renato Altissimo

== Electoral results ==
While for European elections each party stood individually, the Pentapartito coalition emerged in general elections emerged. In various electoral debates, the coalition parties did not attack each other, maintaining between them a form of neutrality, and concentrated their hostility against the PCI, MSI, and other minor parties. The coalition governed Italy with a strong electoral majority from 1980 to 1991, the year the PRI defected from the coalition. This defection, the rise of Lega Nord (LN), and the disaffection towards the DC led to a sharp decline of the Pentapartito's electoral pool.

In the 1992 Italian general election, the coalition lost its absolute electoral majority in both houses of the Italian Parliament, losing over 3 million votes; however, the electoral law permitted the coalition to achieve narrow majorities in both the Chamber of Deputies (majority of 16 seats) and the Senate of the Republic (majority of 5 seats, or 8 when considering senators for life Paolo Emilio Taviani, Andreotti from DC, and Francesco De Martino from PSI). The chaos provoked during the 1992 Italian presidential election, the weak leadership of Amato, the eruption of Tangentopoli with many ministers and majority MPs investigated or arrested, and the Mattarellum led to the removal of almost all party oligarchies from both majority and opposition, with the exceptions of the Democratic Party of the Left (PDS), the MSI, LN, and other regionalist parties, the subsequent dissolution of all the parties of the Pentapartito, and to a snap election that was won by Silvio Berlusconi, leading to the birth of the Second Republic and the Berlusconi era.

=== Italian Parliament ===
Chamber of Deputies
Election year	Votes	%	Seats	+/−	Prime Minister
1983	20,862,169 (1st)	56.3	366 / 630	–	Bettino Craxi
1987	22,114,134 (1st)	57.3	381 / 630	▲15	Giovanni Goria
1992	19,170,106 (1st)	48.9	331 / 630	▼50	Giuliano Amato

Senate of the Republic
Election year	Votes	%	Seats	+/−	Prime Minister
1983	17,088,783 (1st)	54.9	182 / 315	–	Bettino Craxi
1987	18,108,049 (1st)	55.9	186 / 315	▲4	Giovanni Goria
1992	15,405,421 (1st)	46.2	163 / 315	▼23	Giuliano Amato
