= Fifth Andreotti government =

35th government of the Italian Republic

Andreotti V Cabinet
- 35th Cabinet of Italy

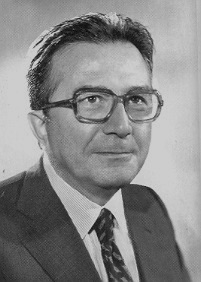
- Date formed: 21 March 1979
- Date dissolved: 5 August 1979

People and organisations
- Head of state: Sandro Pertini
- Head of government: Giulio Andreotti
- Member parties: DC, PSDI, PRI
- Status in legislature: Coalition government

History
- Outgoing election: 1979 election
- Legislature term: VII Legislature (1976–1979)
- Predecessor: Andreotti IV Cabinet
- Successor: Cossiga I Cabinet

The Andreotti V Cabinet, led by Giulio Andreotti, was the 35th cabinet of the Italian Republic.

This government was established after a political crisis in January 1979 following the announcement by the leader of the Italian Communist Party Enrico Berlinguer that he had withdrawn his party's parliamentary support for Andreotti's previous government, which led to the collapse of the ruling majority.

The government did not gain confidence in the Senate with a single vote: 149 senators voted in favor of the confidence motion and 150 against. Consequently, the executive resigned 11 days after his establishment.

== Party breakdown ==
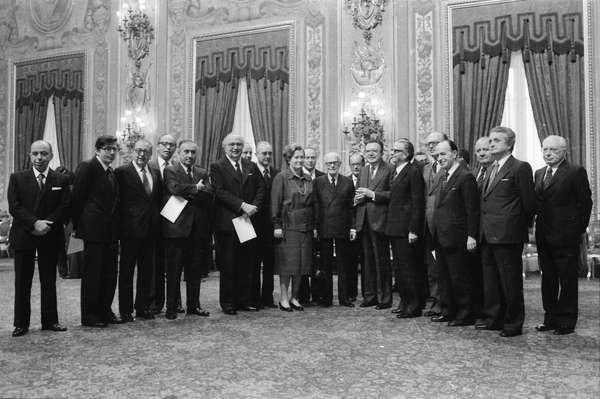
Official photo of the Andreotti's government after the oath at the Quirinal Palace

- Christian Democracy (DC): prime minister, 14 ministers, 39 undersecretaries
- Italian Democratic Socialist Party (PSDI): 3 ministers, 7 undersecretaries
- Italian Republican Party (PRI): 3 ministers, 4 undersecretaries

== Composition ==
Portfolio	Minister	Took office	Left office	Party
Prime Minister	Giulio Andreotti	21 March 1979	5 August 1979	DC
Deputy Prime Minister	Ugo La Malfa	21 March 1979	26 March 1979	PRI
Minister of Foreign Affairs	Arnaldo Forlani	21 March 1979	5 August 1979	DC
Minister of the Interior	Virginio Rognoni	21 March 1979	5 August 1979	DC
Minister of Grace and Justice	Tommaso Morlino	21 March 1979	5 August 1979	DC
Minister of Budget and Economic Planning	Ugo La Malfa	21 March 1979	26 March 1979	PRI
Minister of Budget and Economic Planning	Bruno Visentini	26 March 1979	5 August 1979	PRI
Minister of Finance	Franco Maria Malfatti	21 March 1979	5 August 1979	DC
Minister of Treasury	Filippo Maria Pandolfi	21 March 1979	5 August 1979	DC
Minister of Defence	Attilio Ruffini	21 March 1979	5 August 1979	DC
Minister of Public Education	Giovanni Spadolini	21 March 1979	5 August 1979	PRI
Minister of Public Works	Francesco Compagna	21 March 1979	5 August 1979	PRI
Minister of Agriculture and Forests	Giovanni Marcora	21 March 1979	5 August 1979	DC
Minister of Transport	Luigi Preti	21 March 1979	5 August 1979	PSDI
Minister of Post and Telecommunications	Vittorino Colombo	21 March 1979	5 August 1979	DC
Minister of Industry, Commerce and Craftsmanship	Franco Nicolazzi	21 March 1979	5 August 1979	PSDI
Minister of Health	Tina Anselmi	21 March 1979	5 August 1979	DC
Minister of Foreign Trade	Gaetano Stammati	21 March 1979	5 August 1979	DC
Minister of Merchant Navy	Luigi Preti (ad interim)	21 March 1979	5 August 1979	PSDI
Minister of State Holdings	Antonio Bisaglia	21 March 1979	5 August 1979	DC
Minister of Labour and Social Security	Vincenzo Scotti	21 March 1979	5 August 1979	DC
Minister of Cultural and Environmental Heritage	Dario Antoniozzi	21 March 1979	5 August 1979	DC
Minister of Tourism and Entertainment	Egidio Ariosto	21 March 1979	5 August 1979	DC
Minister for Extraordinary Interventions in the South (without portfolio)	Michele Di Giesi	21 March 1979	5 August 1979	PSDI
Secretary of the Council of Ministers	Franco Evangelisti	21 March 1979	5 August 1979	DC
