= Paolo Cirino Pomicino =

Italian politician (1939–2026)

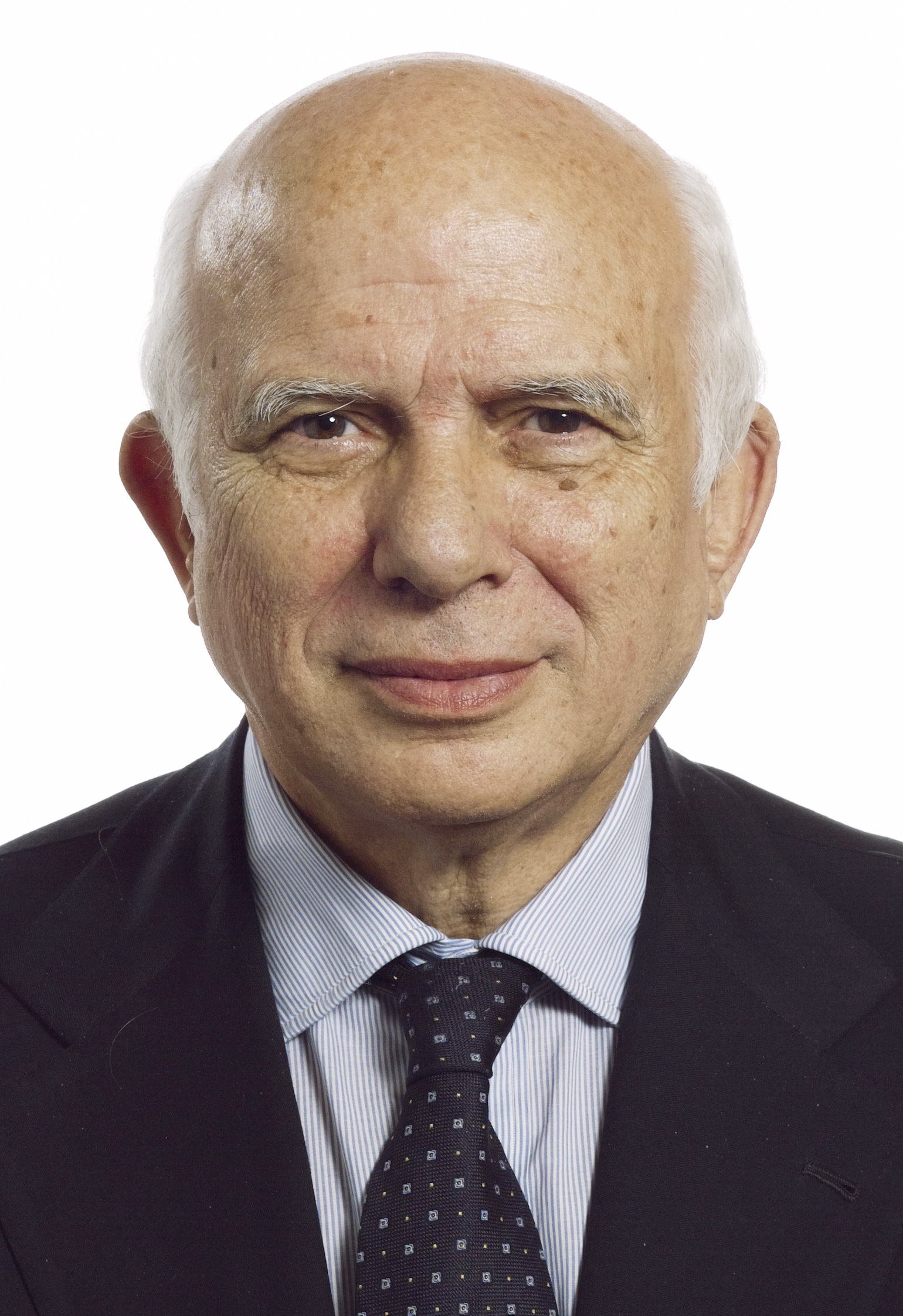
- Official portrait, 2004

Minister of the Budget
- In office 22 July 1989 – 28 July 1992
- Prime Minister: Giulio Andreotti
- Preceded by: Amintore Fanfani
- Succeeded by: Franco Reviglio

Minister of Public Function
- In office 13 April 1988 – 22 July 1989
- Prime Minister: Ciriaco De Mita
- Preceded by: Giorgio Santuz
- Succeeded by: Remo Gaspari

Member of the European Parliament for Southern Italy
- In office 20 July 2004 – 27 April 2006

Member of the Chamber of Deputies
- In office 28 April 2006 – 28 April 2008
- Constituency: Campania
- In office 5 July 1976 – 14 April 1994
- Constituency: Naples

Personal details
- Born: 3 September 1939 Naples, Italy
- Died: 21 March 2026 (aged 86) Rome, Italy
- Party: Italy Is Popular (from 2019)
- Other political affiliations: DC (1972–1994); PPI (1994–2001); DE (2001–2002); UDEUR (2004–2005); DCA (2005–2009); UdC (2009–2019)
- Height: 1.61 m (5 ft 3 in)
- Spouse: Lucia Marotta (m. 2014)
- Education: University of Naples
- Profession: Politician, surgeon

Paolo Cirino Pomicino (3 September 1939 – 21 March 2026) was an Italian politician, who was elected to the Chamber of Deputies in the 2006 Italian general election representing the Christian Democracy for Autonomies.

== Life and career ==
Pomicino was born in Naples on 3 September 1939. He graduated in Medicine and Surgery and entered Christian Democracy for which he became first a member of Naples' city council, and then member of the Italian Chamber of Deputies in 1976, a position he held until 1994.

A member of Giulio Andreotti's government, he was under minister of the Public Functions (1988–1989) and Minister of the Budget (1989–1992). He was nicknamed o' ministro ("The minister" in Neapolitan dialect). During his membership of DC, he has been convicted of illegal financing (sentenced to one year and eight months) and he negotiated (thereby admitting guilt) two months for corruption and hidden funds. He was also involved in the scandal of the funds management for the reconstruction after the 1980 Irpinia earthquake.

Previously, he was a Member of the European Parliament for the Southern region, elected on the UDEUR ticket. He sat on the European Parliament's Committee on Economic and Monetary Affairs, and was a member of the Delegation to the EU-Kazakhstan, EU-Kyrgyzstan and EU-Uzbekistan Parliamentary Cooperation Committees, and for relations with Tajikistan, Turkmenistan and Mongolia and a substitute for the Delegation for relations with the Maghreb countries and the Arab Maghreb Union (including Libya). His attendance to the European Parliament plenary sessions, however, ranks among the lowest, with a mere 44 presences between 2004 and 2006.

Pomicino died in Rome on 21 March 2026, at the age of 86.

== Electoral history ==
Election	House	Constituency	Party	Votes	Result
1976	Chamber of Deputies	Naples–Caserta	DC	79,546	Elected
1979	Chamber of Deputies	Naples–Caserta	DC	105,856	Elected
1983	Chamber of Deputies	Naples–Caserta	DC	102,290	Elected
1987	Chamber of Deputies	Naples–Caserta	DC	168,573	Elected
1992	Chamber of Deputies	Naples–Caserta	DC	68,355	Elected
2004	European Parliament	Southern Italy	UDEUR	41,709	Elected
2006	Chamber of Deputies	Campania 1	DCA	– (Note: Elected in a closed list proportional representation system.)	Elected

Source: Ministry of the Interior
