= Giovanni Goria =

Italian politician (1943–1994)

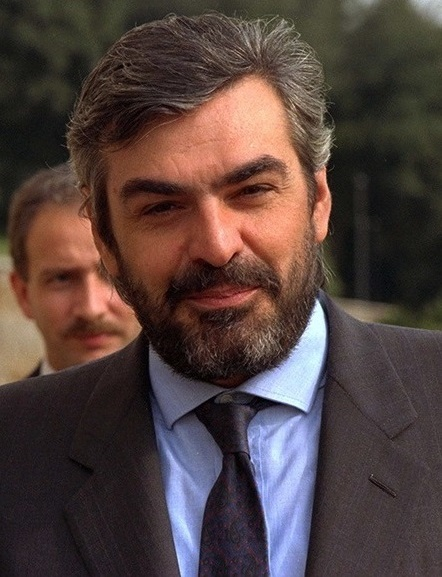

Prime Minister of Italy
- In office 29 July 1987 – 13 April 1988
- President: Francesco Cossiga
- Deputy: Giuliano Amato
- Preceded by: Amintore Fanfani
- Succeeded by: Ciriaco De Mita
Ministerial offices
Minister of Finance
In office 28 June 1992 – 21 February 1993
Prime Minister	Giuliano Amato
Preceded by	Rino Formica
Succeeded by	Vincenzo Visco
Minister of Agriculture
In office 13 April 1991 – 28 June 1992
Prime Minister	Giulio Andreotti
Preceded by	Vito Saccomandi
Succeeded by	Giovanni Angelo Fontana
Minister of Budget
In office 18 April 1987 – 28 July 1987
Prime Minister	Amintore Fanfani
Preceded by	Pier Luigi Romita
Succeeded by	Emilio Colombo
Minister of Treasury
In office 1 December 1982 – 28 July 1987
Prime Minister	Amintore Fanfani; Bettino Craxi
Preceded by	Beniamino Andreatta
Succeeded by	Giuliano Amato
Parliamentary offices
Member of the European Parliament
In office 25 July 1989 – 13 April 1991
Constituency	North-West Italy
Member of the Chamber of Deputies
In office 5 July 1976 – 29 July 1992
Constituency	Cuneo

Personal details
- Born: Giovanni Giuseppe Goria; 30 July 1943 Asti, Kingdom of Italy
- Died: 21 May 1994 (aged 50) Asti, Italy
- Party: Christian Democracy
- Height: 1.78 m (5 ft 10 in)
- Spouse: Eugenia Obermitto
- Children: 2

Giovanni Giuseppe Goria (Italian: [dʒoˈvanni dʒuˈzɛppe ɡoˈriːa]; 30 July 1943 – 21 May 1994) was an Italian politician. He served as the 46th prime minister of Italy from 1987 until 1988.

== Biography ==
=== Background and early life ===
Goria was born in Asti (Piedmont).

Goria was an accountant by profession. He joined the Christian Democracy in 1960 and entered local politics. He was elected to the Chamber of Deputies in 1976. He was undersecretary of the budget from 1981 until 1983 and then became the treasury minister. He became known for his easygoing style and his adeptness at television appearances.

=== Prime Minister of Italy ===
Following the elections of 1987, in which his party did well, Goria became prime minister (the youngest his country had seen since World War II), as a protégé of party chairman (and prime ministerial successor) Ciriaco De Mita. He was forced to resign in 1988 after the Parliament refused to pass his budget.

=== Later political roles ===
Goria was elected to the European Parliament in 1989. He resigned in 1991 to become the Italian Minister of Agriculture. He remained in that position until 1992 when he became finance minister.

He resigned in 1993 during a corruption scandal, which ruined his party. Goria himself was charged with corruption. His trial began in early 1994. He was acquitted of one charge, but his trial was still in progress when he died suddenly of lung cancer in his native Asti on 21 May 1994.

== Electoral history ==
Election	House	Constituency	Party	Votes	Result
1976	Chamber of Deputies	Cuneo–Alessandria–Asti	DC	22,972	Elected
1979	Chamber of Deputies	Cuneo–Alessandria–Asti	DC	25,118	Elected
1983	Chamber of Deputies	Cuneo–Alessandria–Asti	DC	54,610	Elected
1987	Chamber of Deputies	Cuneo–Alessandria–Asti	DC	61,999	Elected
1989	European Parliament	North-West Italy	DC	640,824	Elected
1992	Chamber of Deputies	Cuneo–Alessandria–Asti	DC	33,837	Elected

Source: Ministry of the Interior

Political offices
Preceded by Beniamino Andreatta	Minister of Treasury; 1982–1987	Succeeded by Giuliano Amato
Preceded by Pier Luigi Romita	Minister of Budget; 1987	Succeeded by Emilio Colombo
Preceded by Amintore Fanfani	Prime Minister of Italy; 1987–1988	Succeeded by Ciriaco De Mita
Preceded by Vito Saccomandi	Minister of Agriculture; 1991–1992	Succeeded by Gianni Fontana
Preceded by Salvatore Formica	Minister of Finance; 1992–1993	Succeeded by Vincenzo Visco
