= Renato Altissimo =

Italian politician and minister (1940–2015)

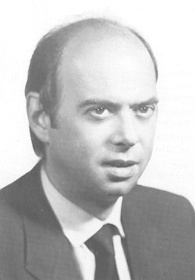

Minister of Industry, Commerce, and Craftmanship
- In office 4 August 1983 – 1 August 1986
- Prime Minister: Bettino Craxi
- Preceded by: Filippo Maria Pandolfi
- Succeeded by: Valerio Zanone

Minister of Health
- In office 28 June 1981 – 4 August 1983
- Prime Minister: Giovanni Spadolini; Amintore Fanfani
- Preceded by: Aldo Aniasi
- Succeeded by: Costante Degan
- In office 4 August 1979 – 4 April 1980
- Prime Minister: Francesco Cossiga
- Preceded by: Tina Anselmi
- Succeeded by: Aldo Aniasi

Member of the Chamber of Deputies
- In office 20 June 1979 – 14 April 1994
- Constituency: Turin (1979–1987); Verona–Padova–Vicenza–Rovigo (1987–1992); Rome (1992–1994)
- In office 25 May 1972 – 4 July 1976
- Constituency: Turin–Novara–Vercelli

Personal details
- Born: 4 October 1940 Portogruaro, Kingdom of Italy
- Died: 17 April 2015 (aged 74) Rome, Italy
- Party: Italian Liberal Party
- Education: University of Turin

Renato Altissimo (4 October 1940 – 17 April 2015) was an Italian politician and minister.

== Life and career ==
Altissimo was born on 4 October 1940 in Portogruaro, near Venice. He was a member of the Italian Liberal Party (Partito Liberale Italiano, PLI), a small party that served as a junior partner in several governing coalitions.

A long time follower of party leader Valerio Zanone, Altissimo served as PLI's national secretary from 1986, succeeding Alfredo Biondi. He resigned in March 1993 after being accused of implication in a corruption scandal; he denied any wrongdoing. Altissimo was also Health Minister in the governments of Francesco Cossiga (1979–1980), Giovanni Spadolini (1980–1981), and Amintore Fanfani (1982–1983). He served as Minister of Industry, Commerce, and Craftmanship in the first government of Bettino Craxi (1983–1986).

== Electoral history ==
Election	House	Constituency	Party	Votes	Result
1972	Chamber of Deputies	Turin–Novara–Vercelli	PLI	18,044	Elected
1976	Chamber of Deputies	Turin–Novara–Vercelli	PLI	9,533	Not elected
1979	Chamber of Deputies	Turin–Novara–Vercelli	PLI	14,821	Elected
1983	Chamber of Deputies	Turin–Novara–Vercelli	PLI	18,447	Elected
1987	Chamber of Deputies	Verona–Padova–Vicenza–Rovigo	PLI	5,655	Elected
1992	Chamber of Deputies	Rome–Viterbo–Latina–Frosinone	PLI	22,898	Elected

Political offices
Preceded by Tina Anselmi	Italian Minister of Health; 1979–1980	Succeeded by Aldo Aniasi
Preceded by Aldo Aniasi	Italian Minister of Health; 1981–1983	Succeeded by Costante Degan
Preceded by Filippo Maria Pandolfi	Italian Minister of Industry, Commerce, and Craftmanship; 1983–1986	Succeeded by Valerio Zanone
