= Pier Luigi Romita =

Italian politician (1924–2003)

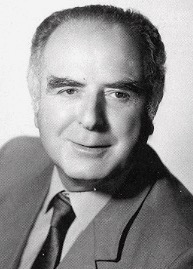
- Romita in 1983

Minister for the Coordination of Community Policies
- In office 23 July 1989 – 28 June 1992
- Prime Minister: Giulio Andreotti
- Preceded by: Antonio Mario La Pergola
- Succeeded by: Raffaele Costa

Minister for the Budget and Economic Planning
- In office 30 July 1984 – 18 April 1987
- Prime Minister: Bettino Craxi
- Preceded by: Pietro Longo
- Succeeded by: Giovanni Goria

Minister for Regional Affairs
- In office 4 August 1983 – 30 July 1984
- Prime Minister: Bettino Craxi
- Preceded by: Fabio Fabbri
- Succeeded by: Carlo Vizzini

Minister for Scientific and Technological Research
- In office 18 October 1980 – 26 June 1981
- Prime Minister: Arnaldo Forlani
- Preceded by: Vincenzo Balzamo
- Succeeded by: Carlo Vizzini
- In office 26 July 1972 – 8 July 1973
- Prime Minister: Giulio Andreotti
- Preceded by: Fiorentino Sullo
- Succeeded by: Pietro Bucalossi

Secretary of the Italian Democratic Socialist Party
- In office October 1976 – October 1978
- Preceded by: Giuseppe Saragat
- Succeeded by: Pietro Longo

Member of the Chamber of Deputies
- In office 12 June 1958 – 15 April 1994
- Constituency: Single National Constituency (1958–1983; 1992–1994); Cuneo (1983–1992)

Personal details
- Born: 27 July 1924 Turin, Italy
- Died: 23 March 2003 (aged 78) Milan, Italy
- Party: PSI (1942–1947; 1989–1994); PSDI (1947–1989); UDS (1989); SI (1994–1997); PDS (1997–1998); DS (1998–2003)
- Education: Polytechnic University of Milan

Pier Luigi Romita (27 July 1924 – 23 March 2003) was an Italian politician who was several times a minister of the Italian Republic.

== Biography ==
Romita was born in Turin, the son of Giuseppe Romita, a long-time member of the Italian Socialist Party (Partito Socialista Italiano; PSI) and Minister of the Interior in 1946. During the Fascist period, he followed his father into confinement on the islands of Ustica and Ponza, and then at Veroli. In 1933 the family moved to Rome.

In 1942, aged 19, he entered the PSI and took part in the Italian resistance movement, as a member of the partisan bands operating in the Colli Albani. In 1947 he graduated in engineering and later taught hydraulics in the Faculty of Agronomy of the University of Milan. In 1958, after the death of his father, he was elected to the Chamber of Deputies for the Italian Democratic Socialist Party (Partito Socialista Democratico Italiano; PSDI), where he remained until the end of the XI legislature in 1994.

Romita's first government positions were as undersecretary for Public Works (1963–1966), Education (1966–1968 and 1970–1972) and the Interior (1968–1969). He was subsequently the Minister of Scientific Research on three occasions, in the Andreotti II (1972–1973), Forlani (1980–1981) and Fanfani V (1982–1983) Cabinets. He was also Minister of Regional Affairs (1983–1984) and for the Budget (1984–1987) respectively in the first and second Craxi governments.

Romita was national secretary of the PSDI from 1976 to 1978, succeeding Giuseppe Saragat. In early 1989 he left the party and, together with Pietro Longo, founded the Movement of Unity and Socialist Democracy (Movimento di Unità e Democrazia Socialista; UDS), which merged later that same year with the PSI. He was Minister of Community Policies in the Andreotti VII Cabinet. After the disbandment of the PSI in 1994, he entered the newly formed Italian Socialists (SI) and then, from 1997, the Democratic Party of the Left (PDS).

Romita died in Milan in 2003.

Preceded by Giuseppe Saragat	Secretary of the Italian Democratic Socialist Party; 1976–1978	Succeeded by Pietro Longo
