= Pensioners' National Party =

Pensioners' National Party Partito Nazionale Pensionati
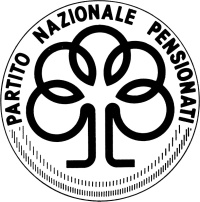
- Secretary: Achille Facchinetti; Giuseppe Polini
- Founded: 1979
- Dissolved: c.1990
- Headquarters: Via Azzo Gardino 3, 40122 Bologna
- Membership (1983): 15,000
- Ideology: Pensioners' interests Single issue politics

The Pensioners' National Party (Partito Nazionale Pensionati, PNP) was a political party active in Italy.

== History ==
The PNP was founded in 1979 in Bologna by Achille Facchinetti.

The party ran in the 1983 general elections, obtaining 1.4% of the votes for the Chamber and 1.2% of the votes for the Senate. Despite the good result, the party, however, did not reach a quorum in any constituency and so didn't get any seats in Parliament.

On the occasion of the 1987 general elections, the party struck an electoral agreement with the Venetian League. The list (called "Venetian League – United Pensioners") obtained 0.8% of the votes for the Chamber and 0.9% of the votes for the Senate. Also on this occasion the party failed to elect its members to parliament by about 1,200 votes. After the electoral defeat, the national deputy secretary of the party Carlo Fatuzzo, the provincial secretary of Milan Roberto Bernardelli, as well as the former party president Alberto Marconi (already expelled from the PNP shortly before the elections), accused Facchinetti of having received money from the Italian Socialist Party without informing the party directorate, as well as of having carried out electoral negotiations without consulting the electoral committee.

Fatuzzo, along with six other members of the PNP (Bernardelli included), was expelled from the party and founded the new Pensioners' Party.

In 1990 the new secretary Giuseppe Polini merged the PNP with numerous associations for the defence of pensioners in the new movement Pensioners Alive (Pensionati Vivi).

== Election results ==
=== Chamber of Deputies ===
Election	Leader	Votes	%	Seats	+/−	Status
1983	Achille Facchinetti	503,461	1.4	0 / 630	New	Extra-parliamentary
1987	Achille Facchinetti	In the Venetian League		0 / 630	Steady	Extra-parliamentary

=== Senate ===
Election	Leader	Votes	%	Seats	+/−	Status
1983	Achille Facchinetti	370,756	1.2	0 / 315	New	Extra-parliamentary
1987	Achille Facchinetti	In the Venetian League		0 / 315	Steady	Extra-parliamentary
