= Alberto Simonini =

Italian politician (1896–1960)

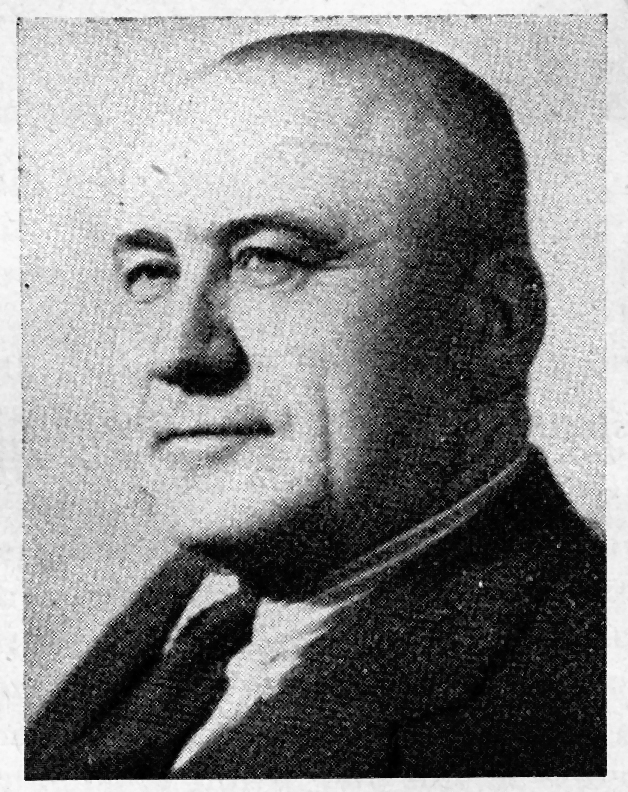

Minister of Post and Telecommunications
- In office 1958–1959
- Prime Minister: Amintore Fanfani

Minister of Merchant Navy
- In office 1950–1951
- Prime Minister: Alcide De Gasperi

Personal details
- Born: 19 February 1896 Reggio Emilia, Kingdom of Italy
- Died: 6 July 1960 (aged 64) Strasbourg, France
- Party: PSU (1922–1930); PSI (1943–1947); PSDI (1947–1960)

Alberto Simonini (19 February 1896 – 6 July 1960) was an Italian trade unionist and socialist politician. Being a member of the Italian Parliament he held several cabinet posts. He was one of the early Italian members of the European Council.

== Biography ==
Simonini was born in Reggio Emilia in on 19 February 1896. After graduating from primary school he began to work as a mechanic. He joined the Socialist Youth Federation in 1912 and served as its secretary between 1913 and 1915. He also worked for some newspapers during this period. In 1919 he was arrested and imprisoned until 1920.

Simonini became a member of the Unitary Socialist Party (PSU) in August 1922. He moved to Turin to direct the regional secretariat of the Construction Workers' Federation and the confederal secretariat of the Province of Turin. He retired from politics during the Fascist rule. However, he was again arrested in 1932.

Simonini resumed his political activity and joined the Italian Socialist Party (PSI) in 1943. Then he became a member of the Italian Democratic Socialist Party (PSDI), of which he was the second secretary in 1948 (after Giuseppe Saragat). He was elected as a deputy in 1946 and was a member of the Parliament in the second and third legislatures. He was minister of the merchant navy for one year between 1950 and 1951. He also served as the minister of post and telecommunications from 1958 to 1959.

Simonini was elected as a member of the European Council.

On 6 July 1960, Simonini died of a heart attack at the age of 64 in Strasbourg, France, where he was to participate in the work of the European Parliament.

=== Legacy ===
The Italian presidency established a foundation, Fondazione Simonini, after him in 1967.

| Preceded by Giuseppe Saragat | Secretary of the Italian Democratic Socialist Party; 1948 | Succeeded by Ugo Guido Mondolfo |
