= Antonio Cariglia =

Italian politician (1924–2010)

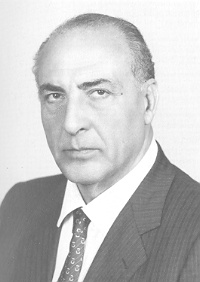

Member of the Chamber of Deputies
- In office 1963–1976
- In office 1992–1994

Member of the Senate
- In office 1987–1992

Member of the European Parliament
- In office 1979–1984
- In office 1989–1994

Personal details
- Born: 28 March 1924 Vieste, Apulia, Italy
- Died: 20 February 2010 (aged 85) Pistoia, Tuscany, Italy
- Party: PSDI
- Profession: Politician

Antonio Cariglia (28 March 1924 – 20 February 2010) was an Italian politician.

== Biography ==
A graduate in political and social sciences, Cariglia was an MP and MEP several times between the 1960s and the 1990s for the Italian Democratic Socialist Party (PSDI), of which he was secretary from 1988 to 1992, when he became president of the party.

In 1993, he was arrested at the behest of magistrates investigating the Mani pulite corruption scandal: among the charges he faced were those of extortion, receiving stolen goods, and illicit financing. Cariglia was acquitted of all charges after a court case that lasted twelve years.

In 2004 he was appointed Honorary President of the reborn Italian Democratic Socialist Party.

He died in 2010, at the age of 85.

Preceded by Franco Nicolazzi	Secretary of the Italian Democratic Socialist Party; 1988–1992	Succeeded by Carlo Vizzini
