= List for Trieste =

Defunct political party in Italy

List for Trieste Lista per Trieste
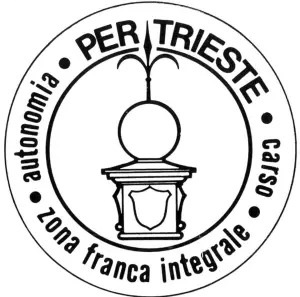
- Leader: Mario Cecovini; Giulio Camber
- Founded: 1978
- Dissolved: 2006
- Merged into: Forza Italia
- Ideology: Regionalism; Environmentalism; Liberal socialism
- Political position: Catch-all party
- National affiliation: Italian Socialist Party (1987-1994); Forza Italia (1994-2006)
- European Parliament group: ELDR group

The List for Trieste (Lista per Trieste, LpT) was a social-liberal Italian political party active in the Province of Trieste.

== History ==
The party, which was officially launched in 1978, emerged from an opinion movement which arose in Trieste after the Treaty of Osimo was negotiated by Italy and Yugoslavia in 1975. A local committee collected more than 65,000 signatures in order to stop the ratification of it by the Italian Parliament, which however eventually approved it in 1977. LpT was formed in order to ask some special rights for the area of Trieste.

In the 1978 regional election the party, which considers itself "the first civic list in Italy", won 6.5% of the vote and four regional deputies, while Manlio Cecovini was appointed mayor of Trieste, after a strong showing of the party in the municipal election (27.5%). In the 1979 general election LpT won 28.7% of the vote in the Province of Trieste and was able to elect Aurelia Benco Gruber to the Italian Chamber of Deputies. Some days later Manlio Cecovini (mayor of Trieste, 1978–1983) was elected to the European Parliament for the Italian Liberal Party.

For the 1983 general election LpT formed an alliance with Lega Lombarda and Piedmontese Union, so that Umberto Bossi was a candidate in Lombardy under the banner of LpT. The alliance won 0.3% of the vote nationally, but won only 19.7% in Trieste, thus failing to re-enter Parliament.

Instead of taking part to the process of federation of regionalist parties in Northern Italy around Lega Lombarda and Liga Veneta, since 1987 the party formed an alliance with the Italian Socialist Party (PSI), which led to the election of Giulio Camber to the Chamber of Deputies in 1987 and 1992.

After the disbandment of PSI, most LpT members, including Giulio Camber, Pietro Camber and Roberto Antonione, joined Forza Italia in the 1990s. Antonione was even national coordinator of that party in 2001–2003. Despite this, LpT continues to exist as a minor ally of Forza Italia in Trieste.
