= Egidio Ariosto =

Italian politician (1911–1998)

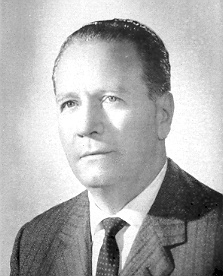
Egidio Ariosto (1968)

Egidio Ariosto (1911–1998) was an Italian politician who was a member of the Italian Democratic Socialist Party (Italian: Partito Socialista Democratico Italiano; PSDI). He served as a deputy, senator and was a cabinet member in different Italian governments.

== Biography ==
Ariosto was born on 26 March 1911. He was a member of the Italian Parliament between 7 December 1976 and 11 October 1979 for the PSDI. He served as the minister of tourism and entertainment in the period between March and August 1979. Next he was minister of culture from 5 August 1979 to 5 April 1980 in the cabinet led by Francesco Cossiga.

Ariosto died on 16 September 1998.
