= Vito Scalia =

Italian politician (1925–2009)

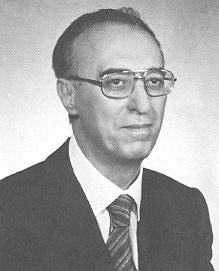
Vito Scalia

Vito Scalia (May 13, 1925 – October 8, 2009) was an Italian Christian Democrat politician.

He served in the Chamber of Deputies of Italy in Legislature II (1953–1958), Legislature III (1958–1963), Legislature IV (1963–1968), Legislature V (1968–1972), Legislature VII (1976–1979) and Legislature VIII (1979–1983). He was the minister without portfolio, responsible mainly for scientific and technological research, in the cabinet of Prime Minister Francesco Cossiga from 1979 to 1980.

Formerly a deputy general secretary of the Catholic Italian Confederation of Trade Unions (CISL), Scalia was described by the journalist Philip Willan as a "Christian Democrat union leader trying to challenge the dominance of the PCI and the Socialist Party over the trade union movement."
