= 1979 Italian general election =

- 3 June 1979

All 630 seats in the Chamber of Deputies 316 seats needed for a majority All 315 elective seats in the Senate 162 seats needed for a majority (Note: taking into account the Senators for life, which accounted for 7 seats at the time the election took place)
- Registered: 42,203,354 (C) · 36,362,037 (S)
- Turnout: 38,242,918 (C) · 90.6% (▼2.8 pp); 32,976,304 (S) · 90.7% (▼2.7 pp)
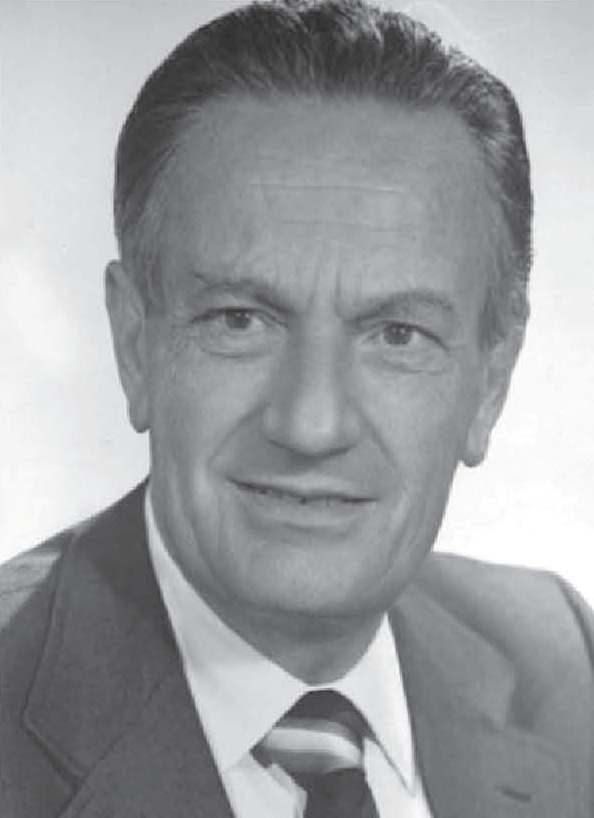

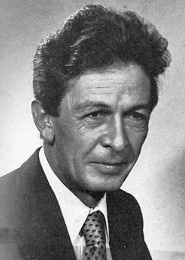

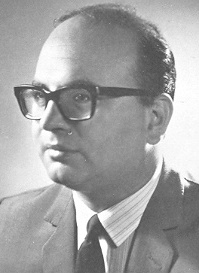

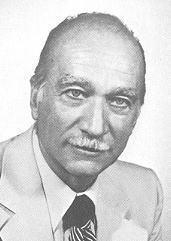

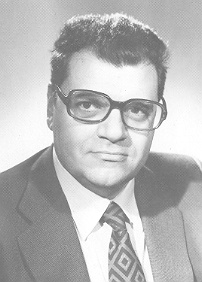

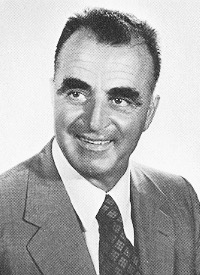
	Majority party	Minority party	Third party
Leader	Benigno Zaccagnini	Enrico Berlinguer	Bettino Craxi
Party	DC	PCI	PSI
Leader since	21 July 1975	17 March 1972	15 July 1976
Leader's seat	Bologna (C)	Rome (C)	Milan (C)
Seats won	262 (C) / 138 (S)	201 (C) / 109 (S)	62 (C) / 32 (S)
Seat change	▼1 (C) / ▲3 (S)	▼26 (C) / ▼7 (S)	▲5 (C) / ▲3 (S)
Popular vote	14,046,290 (C); 12,010,716 (S)	11,139,231 (C); 9,855,951 (S)	3,630,052 (C); 3,252,410 (S)
Percentage	38.3% (C); 38.3% (S)	30.4% (C); 31.5% (S)	9.9% (C); 10.4% (S)
Swing	▼0.4 pp (C) ▼0.5 pp (S)	▼4.0 pp (C) ▼2.3 pp (S)	▲0.3 pp (C) ▲0.2 pp (S)
	Fourth party	Fifth party	Sixth party
Leader	Giorgio Almirante	Pietro Longo	Oddo Biasini
Party	MSI	PSDI	PRI
Leader since	29 June 1969 (Note: Almirante also served as secretary from 1948 to 1950.)	20 October 1978	2 March 1975
Leader's seat	Rome (C)	Rome (C)	Bologna (C)
Seats won	30 (C) / 13 (S)	20 (C) / 9 (S)	16 (C) / 6 (S)
Seat change	▼5 (C) / ▼2 (S)	▲5 (C) / ▲3 (S)	▲2 (C) / 0 (S)
Popular vote	1,930,639 (C); 1,780,950 (S)	1,407,535 (C); 1,320,729 (S)	1,110,209 (C); 1,053,251 (S)
Percentage	5.3% (C); 5.7% (S)	3.8% (C); 4.2% (S)	3.0% (C); 3.4% (S)
Swing	▼0.8 pp (C) ▼0.9 pp (S)	▲0.4 pp (C) ▲1.1 pp (S)	▲0.1 pp (C) ▲0.7 pp (S)
- Results of the election in the Chamber and Senate.
Prime Minister before election
Giulio Andreotti
DC
Prime Minister after the election
Francesco Cossiga
DC

The 1979 Italian general election was held in Italy on 3 June 1979. This election was called just a week before the European elections.

Terrorist attacks by the Red Brigades led to a reversal of the results of the previous election three years before: for the first time the Italian Communist Party lost significant numbers of seats, delaying the government change that had seemed imminent in 1976. The Communist defeat gave new strength to minor parties, as tactical voting for Christian Democracy seemed less necessary to prevent a communist victory. The Christian Democrats remained stable nonetheless, while the neo-fascist Italian Social Movement was weakened by the success of its spin-off National Democracy.

== Electoral system ==
The pure party-list proportional representation had traditionally become the electoral system for the Chamber of Deputies. Italian provinces were united in 32 constituencies, each electing a group of candidates. At constituency level, seats were divided between open lists using the largest remainder method with Imperiali quota. Remaining votes and seats were transferred at national level, where they were divided using the Hare quota, and automatically distributed to best losers into the local lists.

For the Senate, 237 single-seat constituencies were established, even if the assembly had risen to 315 members. The candidates needed a landslide victory of two thirds of votes to be elected, a goal which could be reached only by the German minorities in South Tirol. All remained votes and seats were grouped in party lists and regional constituencies, where a D'Hondt method was used: inside the lists, candidates with the best percentages were elected.

== Historical background ==
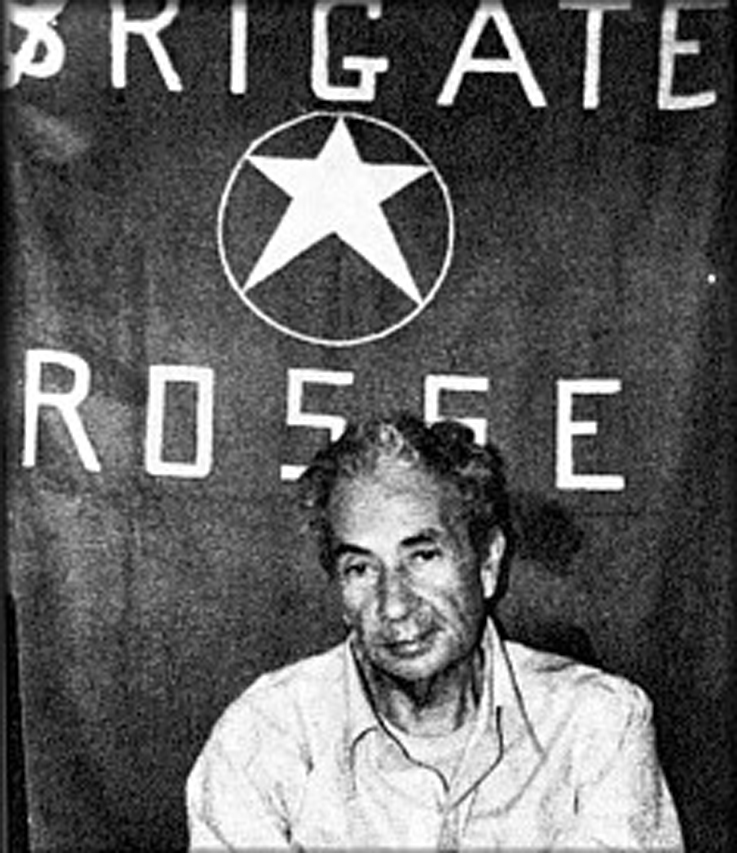
Moro, photographed during his kidnapping by the Red Brigades.

On 16 July 1976, Bettino Craxi was elected to the vacant Italian Socialist Party chairman position, ending years of factional fighting within the party. Ironically, the "old guard" saw him as short-lived leader, allowing each faction time to regroup. However, he was able to hold on to power and implement his policies. In particular, he sought and managed to distance his party away from the communists bringing it into an alliance with Christian Democracy and other centrist parties, but maintaining a leftist and reformist profile.

On 16 March 1978, former Prime Minister and Christian Democratic leader Aldo Moro was kidnapped by the Red Brigades, and five of his bodyguards killed. The Red Brigades were a militant leftist group, then led by Mario Moretti. Aldo Moro was a left-leaning Christian Democrat who served several times as Prime Minister. Before his murder he was trying to include the Italian Communist Party (PCI), headed by Enrico Berlinguer, in the government through a deal called the Historic Compromise. The PCI was the largest communist party in western Europe. This was largely because of its non-extremist and pragmatic stance, its growing independence from Moscow and its eurocommunist doctrine. The PCI was especially strong in areas such as Emilia-Romagna, where it had stable government positions and mature practical experience, which may have contributed to a more pragmatic approach to politics. The Red Brigades were fiercely opposed by the Communist Party and trade unions, a few left-wing politicians even used the condescending expression "comrades who do wrong" (Compagni che sbagliano). The circumstances surrounding Aldo Moro's murder have never been made clear, but the consequences included the fact that PCI did not gain executive power.

In the period of terror attacks of the late 1970s and early 1980s, the parliamentary majority was composed by the parties of the "Arco costituzionale", i.e. all parties supporting the Constitution, including the Communists (who in fact took a very strong stance against the Red Brigades and other terrorist groups). However, the Communists never took part in the Government itself, which was composed by the "Pentapartito" (Christian Democrats, Socialists, Social Democrats, Liberals, Republicans).

== Parties and leaders ==
Party	Ideology	Leader	Seats in 1976		
Party	Ideology	Leader	C	S	Total
Christian Democracy (DC)	Christian democracy	Benigno Zaccagnini	262	135	397
Italian Communist Party (PCI)	Eurocommunism	Enrico Berlinguer	229	116	345
Italian Socialist Party (PSI)	Social democracy	Bettino Craxi	57	30	87
Italian Social Movement (MSI)	Neo-fascism	Giorgio Almirante	35	15	50
Italian Democratic Socialist Party (PSDI)	Social democracy	Pietro Longo	15	7	22
Italian Republican Party (PRI)	Liberalism	Oddo Biasini	14	7	21
Italian Liberal Party (PLI)	Conservative liberalism	Valerio Zanone	5	2	7
Radical Party (PR)	Radicalism	Marco Pannella	4	0	4
Proletarian Unity Party (PdUP)	Communism	Vittorio Foa	New		

== Results ==
Even this eighth legislature of the Italian Republic was a period of great instability. After the election, the Christian-Democratic leadership instructed moderate Francesco Cossiga to form a centrist minority government with the PSDI and the PLI, which accepted an official engagement into the government for the first time since 1973; however, when in 1980 Benigno Zaccagnini was fired as Secretary of the DC and socialist leader Bettino Craxi offered his help, Cossiga suddenly resigned and formed a new centre-left government with the PSI and the PRI, underling that the Catholic leaders had no more problems to choose their allies from anywhere. However, Cossiga later fell on a budget project, and a traditional centre-left government led by Arnaldo Forlani was formed. The great scandal of the masonic lodge P2 sank Forlani in 1981.

This deep political crisis marked the birth of a new political formula which ruled Italy during the 80's: the Pentapartito (or five parties), which was no more than the fusion of the two main alliances that DC had used to rule Italy since 1947, the centrism and the centre-left. This formula became possible because Bettino Craxi's Italian Socialist Party and Valerio Zanone's Italian Liberal Party accepted to form their first republican government together, moderating their positions and passing the opposition that had always divided them. But the Pentapartito pact had another important condition: the DC accepted to recognize a pair role with the other four parties, alternating into the government leadership. The Secretary of the Italian Republican Party, Giovanni Spadolini, so became the first non-DC Prime Minister of Italy since 1945. However, his little party was unable to stop the quarrels between their great allies, and after a little crisis during summer 1982, Spadolini resigned in autumn of the same year. Former-PM Amintore Fanfani formed a new government without the offended republicans, but the PSI, which had good surveys, imposed the final crisis in 1983 and a new general election.

=== Chamber of Deputies ===
← Summary of the 3 June 1979 Chamber of Deputies election results →
Party	Votes	%	Seats	+/−
Christian Democracy (DC)	14,046,290	38.30	262	±0
Italian Communist Party (PCI)	11,139,231	30.38	201	−26
Italian Socialist Party (PSI)	3,596,802	9.81	62	+5
Italian Social Movement (MSI)	1,930,639	5.26	30	−5
Italian Democratic Socialist Party (PSDI)	1,407,535	3.84	20	+5
Radical Party (PR)	1,264,870	3.45	18	+14
Italian Republican Party	1,110,209	3.03	16	+2
Italian Liberal Party (PLI)	712,646	1.94	9	+4
Proletarian Unity Party (PdUP)	502,247	1.37	6	±0
New United Left (NSU)	294,462	0.80	0	New
National Democracy (DN)	229,205	0.63	0	New
South Tyrolean People's Party (SVP)	204,899	0.56	4	+1
List for Trieste (LpT)	65,505	0.18	1	New
Friuli Movement (MF)	35,254	0.10	0	New
Valdostan Union (UV)	33,250	0.09	1	+1
Others	98,264	0.30	0	±0
Invalid/blank votes	1,571,610	–	–	–
Total	38,242,918	100	630	±0
Registered voters/turnout	42,203,354	90.62	–	–
Source: Ministry of the Interior

Popular vote
DC	38.30%
PCI	30.38%
PSI	9.81%
MSI	5.26%
PSDI	3.84%
PR	3.45%
PRI	3.03%
PLI	1.94%
PdUP	1.37%
Others	2.62%

Seats
DC	41.59%
PCI	31.90%
PSI	9.84%
MSI	4.76%
PSDI	3.17%
PR	2.86%
PRI	2.54%
PLI	1.43%
PdUP	0.95%
Others	0.95%

==== Results by constituency ====
Constituency	Total seats	Seats won									
Constituency	Total seats	DC	PCI	PSI	MSI	PSDI	PR	PRI	PLI	PdUP	Others
Turin	39	12	13	4	1	2	2	2	2	1	
Cuneo	15	7	4	1		1		1	1		
Genoa	23	8	8	3	1		1	1	1		
Milan	52	18	17	6	2	2	2	2	2	1	
Como	20	9	5	2		1	1	1	1		
Brescia	23	12	5	2	1	1	1			1	
Mantua	8	4	3	1							
Trentino	10	4	1	1							4
Verona	29	16	6	2	1	1	1	1	1		
Venice	17	8	5	2		1	1				
Udine	11	6	3	1		1					
Bologna	27	7	13	2	1	1	1	2			
Parma	19	6	10	2		1					
Florence	15	5	9	1							
Pisa	14	5	7	2							
Siena	9	3	5	1							
Ancona	17	7	7	1	1			1			
Perugia	10	4	5	1							
Rome	54	20	16	5	4	2	3	2	1	1	
L'Aquila	14	7	5	1	1						
Campobasso	4	3	1								
Naples	38	16	11	3	4	1	1	1		1	
Benevento	18	10	4	2	1	1					
Bari	23	10	7	2	2	1	1				
Lecce	18	9	5	2	2						
Potenza	7	4	2	1							
Catanzaro	23	10	6	3	2	1				1	
Catania	27	12	6	3	3	1	1	1			
Palermo	25	12	5	3	2	1	1	1			
Cagliari	17	7	6	2	1		1				
Aosta Valley	1										1
Trieste	3	1	1								1
Total	630	262	201	62	30	20	18	16	9	6	6

=== Senate of the Republic ===
← Summary of the 3 June 1979 Senate of the Republic election results →
Party	Votes	%	Seats	+/−
Christian Democracy (DC)	12,010,716	38.34	138	+3
Italian Communist Party (PCI)	9,855,951	31.46	109	−7
Italian Socialist Party (PSI)	3,252,410	10.38	32	+3
Italian Social Movement (MSI)	1,780,950	5.68	13	−2
Italian Democratic Socialist Party (PSDI)	1,320,729	4.22	9	+3
Italian Republican Party (PRI)	1,053,251	3.36	6	±0
Italian Liberal Party (PLI)	691,718	2.21	2	±0
Radical Party (PR)	413,444	1.32	2	+2
Radical Party–New United Left (PR–NSU)	365,954	1.17	0	New
National Democracy (DN)	176,966	0.56	0	New
South Tyrolean People's Party (SVP)	172,582	0.55	3	+1
List for Trieste (LpT)	61,911	0.20	0	New
New United Left (NSU)	44,094	0.14	0	New
Valdostan Union (UV)	37,082	0.12	1	±0
Friuli Movement (MF)	31,490	0.10	0	New
Others	61,547	0.19	0	±0
Invalid/blank votes	1,645,509	–	–	–
Total	32,976,304	100	315	±0
Registered voters/turnout	36,362,037	90.69	–	–
Source: Ministry of the Interior

Popular vote
DC	38.34%
PCI	31.46%
PSI	10.38%
MSI	5.68%
PSDI	4.22%
PRI	3.36%
PLI	2.21%
PR	1.32%
Others	3.03%

Seats
DC	43.81%
PCI	34.60%
PSI	10.16%
MSI	4.13%
PSDI	2.86%
PRI	1.90%
PLI	0.63%
PR	0.63%
Others	1.27%

==== Results by constituency ====
Constituency	Total seats	Seats won								
Constituency	Total seats	DC	PCI	PSI	MSI	PSDI	PRI	PLI	PR	Others
Piedmont	25	9	9	3	1	1	1	1		
Aosta Valley	1									1
Lombardy	48	21	15	6	1	2	1	1	1	
Trentino-Alto Adige	7	3	1							3
Veneto	23	14	6	2		1				
Friuli-Venezia Giulia	7	4	2	1						
Liguria	10	4	5	1						
Emilia-Romagna	22	6	12	2		1	1			
Tuscany	20	7	11	2						
Umbria	7	2	4	1						
Marche	8	4	4							
Lazio	27	11	9	2	2	1	1		1	
Abruzzo	7	4	3							
Molise	2	2								
Campania	29	13	8	3	3	1	1			
Apulia	20	9	6	2	2	1				
Basilicata	7	4	2	1						
Calabria	11	5	3	2	1					
Sicily	26	12	6	3	3	1	1			
Sardinia	8	4	3	1						
Total	315	138	109	32	13	9	6	2	2	4

== Maps ==

Seat distribution by constituency for the Chamber of Deputies (left) and Senate (right).
