= Attilio Ruffini =

Italian politician (1924–2011)

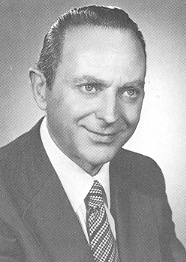

Minister of Foreign Affairs
- In office 15 January 1980 – 4 April 1980
- Prime Minister: Francesco Cossiga; Arnaldo Forlani
- Preceded by: Franco Maria Malfatti
- Succeeded by: Emilio Colombo

Minister of Defence
- In office 18 September 1977 – 14 January 1980
- Prime Minister: Giulio Andreotti; Francesco Cossiga
- Preceded by: Vito Lattanzio
- Succeeded by: Adolfo Sarti

Minister of Merchant Navy (ad interim)
- In office 20 January 1977 – 18 September 1977
- Prime Minister: Giulio Andreotti
- Preceded by: Francesco Fabbri
- Succeeded by: Vito Lattanzio

Minister of Transport
- In office 30 July 1976 – 18 September 1977
- Prime Minister: Giulio Andreotti
- Preceded by: Mario Martinelli
- Succeeded by: Vito Lattanzio

Member of the Chamber of Deputies
- In office 16 May 1963 – 1 July 1987
- Constituency: Sicilia

Personal details
- Born: 31 December 1924 Mantua, Italy
- Died: 23 June 2011 (aged 86) Rome, Italy
- Party: Christian Democracy
- Education: Università Cattolica del Sacro Cuore
- Profession: Politician, lawyer

Attilio Ruffini (31 December 1924 – 23 June 2011) was an Italian politician.

== Biography ==
Born in Mantua in December 1924, Attilio Ruffini completed his first studies in his hometown. After completing the first part of his schooling, he moved to Milan where, having won a scholarship, he enrolled in the Faculty of Law of the Catholic University of the Sacred Heart (then run by Father Agostino Gemelli), where he achieved in the years following the Second World War, the degree.

Ruffini actively participated in the Resistance, cooperating with the partisans of the Catholic Brigades of the Green Flames and being part of the National Liberation Committee (C.L.N.).

In the autumn of 1944, he was captured by a group of the Mantuan Black Brigades and led to the Barracks of the Black Brigades of Cerese, where he was subjected to the first interrogations regarding the anti-fascist activity of the Mantuan Catholics and, in particular, of the Catholic university students. Transferred to the Mandatory Prison in Mantua, in Via Poma, he was then taken over by the S.S. Germans who transferred it to the Forte San Leonardo in Verona. On 13 December 1944, he was subjected to the last interrogation, conducted personally by the commander of the S.S. Germans in Italy, General Karl Wolff. On 19 December of the same year he was taken to Verona, to the General Command of the S.S. and there he was finally freed.

Subsequently, until the Liberation, it was part of the partisan Brigade "Ivanoe Bonomi" who liberated and presided over the city of Mantua until the arrival of the allied troops.

He began the forensic activity in Mantua at the office of the lawyer Ennio Avanzini, already a member of the Constituent Assembly and the Chamber of Deputies. In the meantime he became provincial secretary of the Christian Democracy until in 1955 he moved to Palermo, where from 1946 his uncle Cardinal Ernesto Ruffini exercised his pastoral activity. In Palermo he married Zina Maria La Loggia, daughter of Giuseppe La Loggia, then President of the Sicilian Regional Assembly. He continued to practice the profession of lawyer until 1963, the year in which, having been elected to the Chamber of Deputies, he renounced all professional duties.

He was member of the Chamber of Deputies from 1963 to 1987, in the IV, V, VI, VII, VIII and IX legislature. In 1972 he served Andreotti II Government, as Undersecretary of State, first for Public Education and then for Treasury, office confirmed also in the Rumor IV government. In 1976 he was appointed Minister of Transport in the Andreotti III Government and the following year he took on the interim position as Minister of Merchant Navy. In 1977 he was appointed Minister of Defense, a position that also held in later governments Andreotti IV and V.

The IV Andreotti government was the first government to obtain external support from the PCI: on 16 March 1978 the President of the D.C. Aldo Moro was kidnapped and his escort was murdered in Via Fani, in Rome. At that time, Ruffini as Minister of Defence took part in the C.I.S. (Inter-ministerial Security Committee). Chaired by the then Prime Minister Giulio Andreotti, it was composed of the heads of various Dicasteries, among which was the Dicastery chaired by Ruffini. From the moment of the Moro kidnapping, the Committee met weekly for the duration of the fifty-five days of the kidnapping.

On 10 August 1978, together with the Prime Minister and the Minister of Interior Rognoni, he signed the decree appointing General Carlo Alberto Dalla Chiesa to head the coordination of activities against terrorism and organized crime. Massimo Ciancimino, in the book dedicated to his father Vito Ciancimino, accused Ruffini of having been in contact with mafia circles. The same book presented a letter from Vito Ciancimino to Ruffini in reference to an interview published on L'Ora on 13 January 1980, in which Ruffini rejected the accusations of mafia connivance. Massimo Ciancimino was arrested on charges of aggravated slander against former police chief Gianni De Gennaro for the statements made by Ciancimino himself on the relationship between the mafia and politics.

In the Cossiga I government, in 1980, Ruffini was first confirmed Minister of Defence and subsequently appointed Minister of Foreign Affairs until April 1980. During that same period, he held the office of current President of the Council of the European Community. He did not run again for the 1987 general election, dedicating himself again to his professional activity until 1994.

Attilio Ruffini died in Rome on 23 June 2011.
