= Pietro Longo =

Italian politician

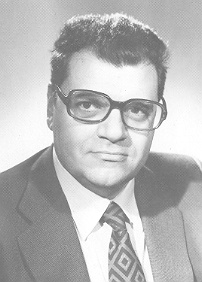
- Longo in 1983

Secretary of the Italian Democratic Socialist Party
- In office 20 October 1978 – 11 October 1985
- Preceded by: Pier Luigi Romita
- Succeeded by: Franco Nicolazzi

Minister of the Budget and Economic Planning
- In office 4 August 1983 – 13 July 1984
- Prime Minister: Bettino Craxi
- Preceded by: Guido Bodrato
- Succeeded by: Bettino Craxi

Member of the Chamber of Deputies
- In office 5 June 1968 – 24 May 1972
- Constituency: Perugia
- In office 5 July 1976 – 1 July 1987
- Constituency: Benevento (1976–79); Rome (1979–87)

Personal details
- Born: 29 October 1935 (age 90) Rome, Italy
- Party: PSI (1951–68; 1989–92); PSDI (1968–89); UDS (1989)
- Profession: Sociologist, lawyer

Pietro Longo (born 29 October 1935) is an Italian politician.

== Life and career ==
Longo was born in Rome. His mother, Rosa Fazio Longo, from Campobasso, was a resistance fighter and member of the Italian Socialist Party (Partito Socialista Italiano; PSI) who was elected to Parliament in 1948. Longo studied law and social sciences at university, and as a sociologist became one of the founders of Censis (Centro Studi Investimenti Sociali), a socio-economic research institute. Politically, he followed in his mother's footsteps by becoming associated with the PSI's youth wing in 1951. A member of the party's autonomist-reformist current, he supported PSI leader Pietro Nenni's condemnation of the Soviet invasion of Hungary in 1956, and from 1964 to 1968 was head of Nenni's political secretariat while the latter was Deputy Prime Minister.

In 1966, the PSI and its social democratic rival, the Italian Democratic Socialist Party (Partito Socialista Democratico Italiano; PSDI), joined forces to create a Unified PSI-PSDI coalition in the hope of maximising their electoral potential. The disappointing outcome of the 1968 general election frustrated these aspirations, and during the ensuing reseparation Longo was one of a minority of PSI activists who chose to join the PSDI. He was elected to the Chamber of Deputies that same year at the relatively young age of 32. As a leading figure in the PSDI's left-wing 'Socialist Democracy' tendency, he distinguished himself by arguing for the introduction of a national minimum wage policy at the party's 15th congress in 1971. Elected national vice-secretary in 1972, on 20 October 1978 he succeeded Pier Luigi Romita as the PSDI's national secretary (i.e., leader). He was confirmed as secretary at the party's 18th congress, held in Rome in February 1980, and at the 19th, held in Milan in March 1982.

Longo was appointed Minister for the Budget and Economic Planning in Bettino Craxi's first cabinet. In 1984 he had to resign from this position, and later (1985) as PSDI secretary, after he was revealed to have been a member of the clandestine Propaganda Due (P2) masonic lodge since 1981. He failed to be re-elected to the Chamber of Deputies in the 1987 general election and lost judicial immunity. Longo thus underwent trial for the ICOMEC bribe scandal, being condemned in first (1989), second (1991) and third (1992) grade. This last condemnation caused him to be imprisoned in Rome's Rebibbia jail, where he served five months of a sentence of two and a half years before being released on probation.

Longo was replaced as secretary of the PSDI by Franco Nicolazzi, but disagreed with his successor's hostile attitude towards the PSI and publicly regretted having endorsed him. He eventually left the PSDI in early 1989 and joined forces with Pier Luigi Romita to establish a new force, the Movement of Unity and Socialist Democracy (Movimento di Unità e Democrazia Socialista; UDS). The UDS was intended primarily as a device that would allow disaffected PSDI members to leave the party and adhere to the PSI electoral 'area', with a view to eventual merger. Thus, after fighting the 1989 European Parliament election on the PSI list, the UDS was fully absorbed into the PSI later that year, with Longo assuming a place on the party's National Directorate. His return to the Socialists, after a period of 21 years, ended with his conviction and imprisonment in 1992.

Party political offices
Preceded by Pier Luigi Romita	Secretary of the Italian Democratic Socialist Party; 1978–1985	Succeeded by Franco Nicolazzi
