= Italian Democratic Socialist Party =

Italian political party

Italian Democratic Socialist Party Partito Socialista Democratico Italiano
- Abbreviation: PSDI
- Leading figures: Giuseppe Saragat (first); Carlo Vizzini (last)
- Founder: Giuseppe Saragat
- Founded: 11 January 1947; 79 years ago
- Dissolved: 10 May 1998; 28 years ago
- Split from: Italian Socialist Party
- Merged into: Italian Democratic Socialists
- Headquarters: Largo Toniolo 16, Rome
- Newspaper: L'Umanità
- Youth wing: Young Social Democrats
- Ideology: Social democracy
- Political position: Centre-left
- National affiliation: Centrist coalition (1947–1958); Organic centre-left (1962–1976); Unified Socialist Party (1966–1969); Pentapartito (1980–1993); Quadripartito (1991–1994)
- European affiliation: Party of European Socialists (1992–1994)
- European Parliament group: Party of European Socialists (1979–1994); Forza Europa (1994–1995)
- International affiliation: Socialist International
- Colours: Red (official); Pink (customary)

The Italian Democratic Socialist Party (Italian: Partito Socialista Democratico Italiano, PSDI), also known as the Italian Social Democratic Party, was a social-democratic political party in Italy. The longest serving partner in government for Christian Democracy, the PSDI was an important force in Italian politics, before the 1990s decline in votes and members. The party's founder and longstanding leader was Giuseppe Saragat, who served as President of the Italian Republic from 1964 to 1971. Compared to the like-minded Italian Socialist Party, it was more centrist, at least until Bettino Craxi's leadership, in fact, it identified with the centre-left.

After a rightward shift in the 1990s, which led some observers to question the PSDI as a social democratic party, it was expelled from the European Socialist Party. When Enrico Ferri founded with Luigi Preti the current European Liberal Social Democracy (SOLE), which was in favour of an alliance with Silvio Berlusconi's centre-right coalition, the choice was stigmatized by the PES and the Socialist International, and an official statement was issued. In January 1995, the party congress put the current of Ferri and Preti in the minority and elected Gian Franco Schietroma as secretary. After the party was disbanded in 1998, the majority went to the Socialist Party of the centre-left coalition, while the party's right-wing current joined centre-right coalition parties. In 2004, the party was established with the same name, Italian Democratic Socialist Party, which remains a minor party associated with both centre-left and centre-right coalitions.

== History ==
=== Early years and government coalitions ===
The party was founded as the Socialist Party of Italian Workers (PSLI) in 1947 by a splinter group of the Italian Socialist Party (PSI) due to the decision of the latter to join the Italian Communist Party (PCI) in the Popular Democratic Front's electoral list for the 1948 Italian general election. The split, led by Giuseppe Saragat and the sons of Giacomo Matteotti, took the name of scissione di Palazzo Barberini (split of Palazzo Barberini), from the name of a palace in Rome where it took place. On 1 May 1951, it joined forces with the smaller Unitary Socialist Party and Labour Democratic Party and took the name Socialist Party – Italian Section of the Socialist International (PS–SIIS). On 7 January 1952, the PS–SIIS was ultimately renamed Italian Democratic Socialist Party (PSDI). From 1949 to 1965, members of the PSDI held the presidency of the Istituto Nazionale di Previdenza Sociale (INPS).

In 1966, the party joined the PSI to form the Unified Socialist Party. In 1969, after a disappointing result at the 1968 Italian general election, it left the new unified party, taking the name Unitary Socialist Party (PSU). It returned to the PSDI name in 1971. In 1980, the party joined Christian Democracy (DC), the PSI, the Italian Republican Party (PRI), and the Italian Liberal Party (PLI) in the five-party coalition (Pentapartito), which ruled the country until 1991, and until 1994 without the PRI. The party's role in the coalition was minimal and was overshadowed by the more powerful PSI. The PSDI was a member of Socialist International and a founder member of the Party of European Socialists (PES). Its members of the European Parliament sat within the Socialist Group since 1979. In 1994, having grown increasingly conservative among social democratic parties, the PSDI was expelled from the PES.

=== Decline and re-foundation ===
The PSDI was involved in the corruption scandals known as Tangentopoli and almost disappeared from the political scene. The 1994 Italian general election resulted in an almost overnight decline of the Pentapartito coalition parties and the rise of Silvio Berlusconi-led Forza Italia, which absorbed many PSDI voters. In January 1995, Gian Franco Schietroma was elected national secretary of the party replacing Enrico Ferri, who wanted to join the centre-right Pole of Freedoms. The followers of Ferri left and established the European Liberal Social Democracy and joined the centre-right Christian Democratic Centre (CCD).

In 1998, the party, led by Schietroma, finally merged with the Italian Socialists, one of the successor parties of the PSI, to form the Italian Democratic Socialists. By then, most members and voters of the party had joined other parties: Forza Italia (as Carlo Vizzini, party leader in 1992–1993), the CDC (as Ferri, party leader in 1993–1995), and The Democrats (as Franco Bruno). The party was re-established in 2004 with the same name, Italian Democratic Socialist Party, as the continuation of the party of Saragat, so that the new PSDI numbers its congresses in perfect continuity with the late PSDI.

== Popular support ==
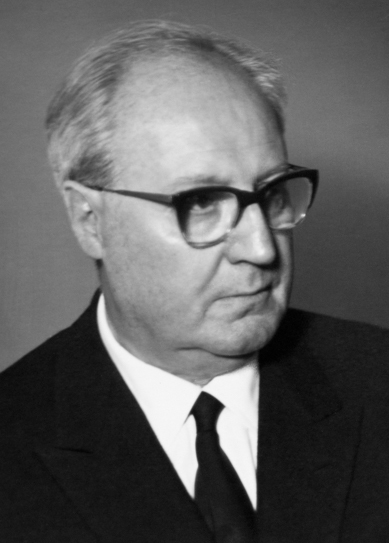
Party leader Giuseppe Saragat in 1964

The PSDI had its best result at its first appearance in the 1948 Italian general election, when it gained 7.1% of the vote. In that occasion, the party was successful in stealing many votes from the PSI, which was damaged by the split as well as by the alliance with the PCI in the Popular Democratic Front. The PSDI found its heartlands in Northern Italy: 12.9% in the Province of Turin, 11.9% in Cuneo, 10.6% in Milan, 13.9% in Sondrio, 12.6% in Treviso, 15.9% in Belluno, and 14.9% in Udine.

Starting in the 1953 Italian general election, the party's support was around 4–5%, with the sole exception of the 1963 Italian general election, when it gained 6.1%. In the 1992 Italian general election, the last before Tangentopoli, the PSDI won 2.7%. The party maintained for decades its strongholds in the North-West and North-East; since the 1960s, it started to gain support in Southern Italy. By the 1987 Italian general election, the party's strongholds had moved South, especially Apulia, Campania, Basilicata, Calabria, and Sicily, similar to what also the other parties of Pentapartito (DC, PSI, PRI, and PLI) were experiencing. This was partly due to the growth of regionalist parties in the North, which were united in Lega Nord starting in 1991. After Tangentopoli, Mani pulite, and subsequent political crisis, the PSDI almost disappeared electorally.

View source data.

The electoral results of PSDI in general (Chamber of Deputies) and European Parliament elections since 1948 are shown in the chart above.

== Electoral results ==
=== Italian Parliament ===
Chamber of Deputies
Election year	Votes	%	Seats	+/−	Leader
1948	1,858,116 (3rd)	7.7	33 / 574	–	Giuseppe Saragat
1953	1,222,957 (6th)	4.5	14 / 590	▼19	Giuseppe Saragat
1958	1,345,447 (5th)	4.6	22 / 596	▲8	Giuseppe Saragat
1963	1,876,271 (5th)	6.1	33 / 630	▲11	Giuseppe Saragat
1968	Into PSU	–	29 / 630	▼4	Giuseppe Saragat
1972	1,718,142 (5th)	5.1	29 / 630	–	Mario Tanassi
1976	1,239,492 (5th)	3.4	15 / 630	▼14	Pier Luigi Romita
1979	1,407,535 (5th)	3.8	20 / 630	▲5	Pietro Longo
1983	1,508,234 (6th)	4.9	23 / 630	▲3	Pietro Longo
1987	1,140,209 (6th)	3.0	17 / 630	▼6	Franco Nicolazzi
1992	1,066,672 (10th)	2.7	16 / 630	▼1	Antonio Cariglia
1994	179,495 (14th)	0.5	0 / 630	▼16	Carlo Vizzini

Senate of the Republic
Election year	Votes	%	Seats	+/−	Leader
1948	1,219,287 (3rd)	5.0	10 / 237	–	Giuseppe Saragat
1953	1,046,301 (6th)	4.3	4 / 237	▼6	Giuseppe Saragat
1958	1,136,803 (5th)	4.4	5 / 246	▲1	Giuseppe Saragat
1963	1,743,837 (5th)	6.4	14 / 315	▲9	Giuseppe Saragat
1968	Into PSU	–	10 / 315	▼4	Giuseppe Saragat
1972	1,614,273 (5th)	5.4	11 / 315	▲1	Mario Tanassi
1976	974,940 (5th)	3.1	6 / 315	▼5	Pier Luigi Romita
1979	1,320,729 (5th)	4.2	9 / 315	▲3	Pietro Longo
1983	1,184,936 (6th)	3.8	8 / 315	▼1	Pietro Longo
1987	822,593 (6th)	2.5	6 / 315	▼2	Franco Nicolazzi
1992	853,895 (10th)	2.6	3 / 315	▼3	Antonio Cariglia
1994	66,589 (14th)	0.2	0 / 315	▼3	Carlo Vizzini

=== European Parliament ===
European Parliament
Election year	Votes	%	Seats	+/−	Leader
1979	1,514,272 (5th)	4.3	4 / 81	–	Pietro Longo
1984	1,225,462 (6th)	3.5	3 / 81	▼1	Pietro Longo
1989	945,383 (7th)	2.7	2 / 81	▼1	Antonio Cariglia
1994	227,439 (13th)	0.7	1 / 87	▼1	Carlo Vizzini

=== Regional elections ===
Regions of Italy
Election year	Votes	%	Seats	+/−	Leader
1970	1,897,034 (4th)	7.0	41 / 720	–	Giuseppe Saragat
1975	1,701,864 (5th)	5.6	36 / 720	▼5	Mario Tanassi
1980	1,505,607 (5th)	5.0	31 / 720	▼5	Pietro Longo
1985	1,150,788 (6th)	3.6	23 / 720	▼8	Pietro Longo
1990	894,318 (6th)	2.8	21 / 720	▼2	Antonio Cariglia

== Symbols ==
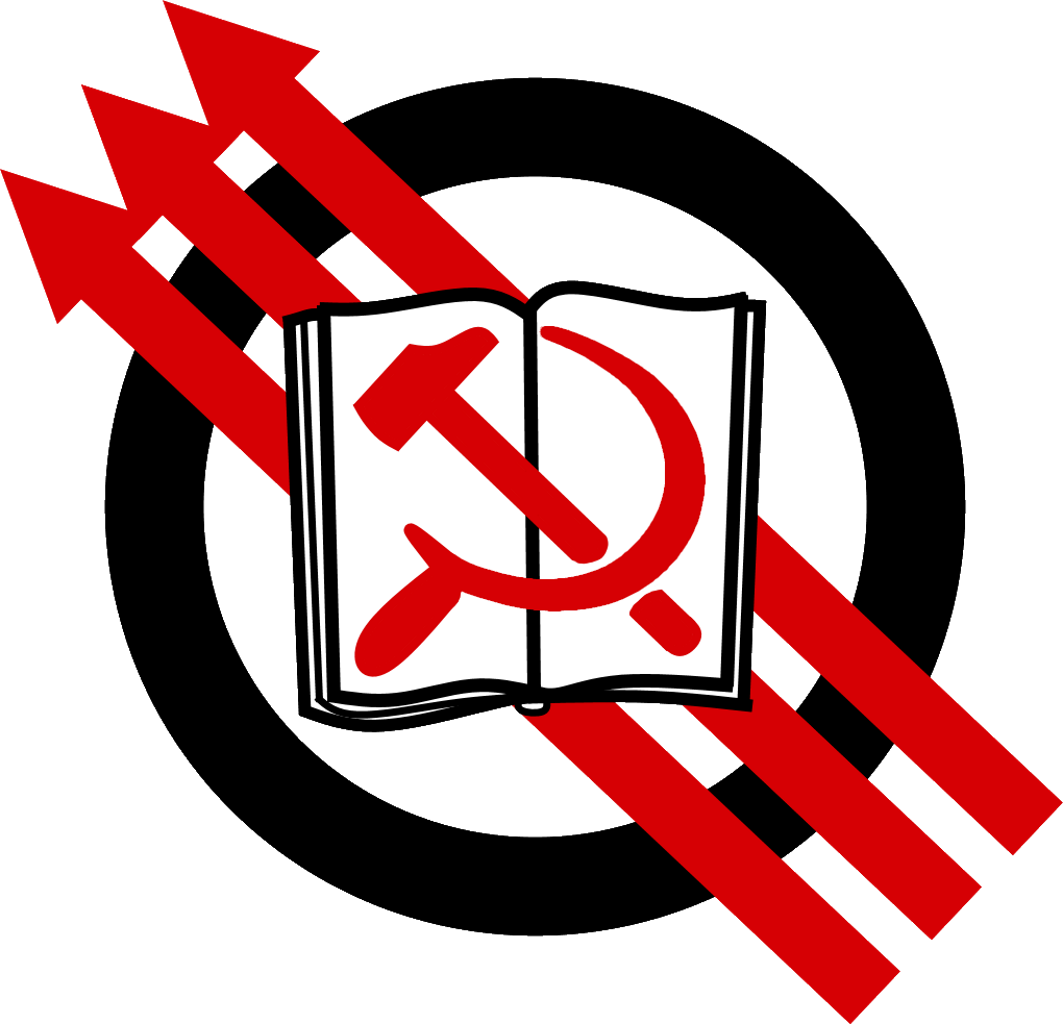
1947–1948

1948–1983

Unified PSI-PSDI symbol, 1966–1969

1983–1992

== Leadership ==
- Secretary: Giuseppe Saragat (1947–1948), Alberto Simonini (1948), Ugo Guido Mondolfo (1949), Ludovico D'Aragona (1949), Giuseppe Saragat (1949–1952), Ezio Vigorelli (1952), Giuseppe Romita (1952), Giuseppe Saragat (1952–1954), Gianmatteo Matteotti (1954–1957), Giuseppe Saragat (1957–1964), Mario Tanassi (1964–1966), unification with PSI in the PSU (1966–1969), Mauro Ferri (1969–1972), Mario Tanassi (1972), Flavio Orlandi (1972–1975), Mario Tanassi (1975–1976), Giuseppe Saragat (1976), Pier Luigi Romita (1976–1978), Pietro Longo (1978–1985), Franco Nicolazzi (1985–1988), Antonio Cariglia (1988–1992), Carlo Vizzini (1992–1993), Enrico Ferri (1993–1995), Gian Franco Schietroma (1995–1998)
- President: Giuseppe Saragat (1975–1976)
- Party Leader in the Chamber of Deputies: Giuseppe Modigliani (1947), Rocco Gullo (1947–1948), Mario Langhena (1948–1950), Luigi Benanni (1950–1951), Ezio Vigorelli (1951–1954), Paolo Rossi (1954–1956), Alberto Simonini (1956–1958), Giuseppe Saragat (1958–1963), Virginio Bertinelli (1963–1966), Mario Tanassi (1966), Egidio Ariosto (1966–1969), Flavio Orlandi (1969–1972), Antonio Cariglia (1972–1976), Luigi Preti (1976–1978), Franco Nicolazzi (1978–1979), Alessandro Reggiani (1979–1987), Filippo Caria (1987–1992), Dino Madaudo (1992), Enrico Ferri (1992–1994)
