= 1987 Italian general election =

- 14–15 June 1987

All 630 seats in the Chamber of Deputies 316 seats needed for a majority All 315 elective seats in the Senate 163 seats needed for a majority (Note: taking into account the Senators for life, who accounted for 9 seats at the time the election took place)
- Registered: 45,692,417 (C) · 38,951,485 (S)
- Turnout: 40,586,573 (C) · 88.8% (▲0.8 pp); 34,421,230 (S) · 88.4% (▼0.4 pp)
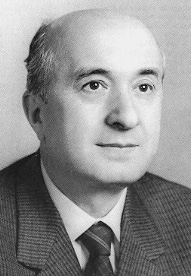

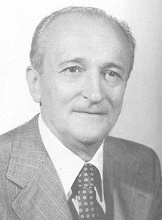

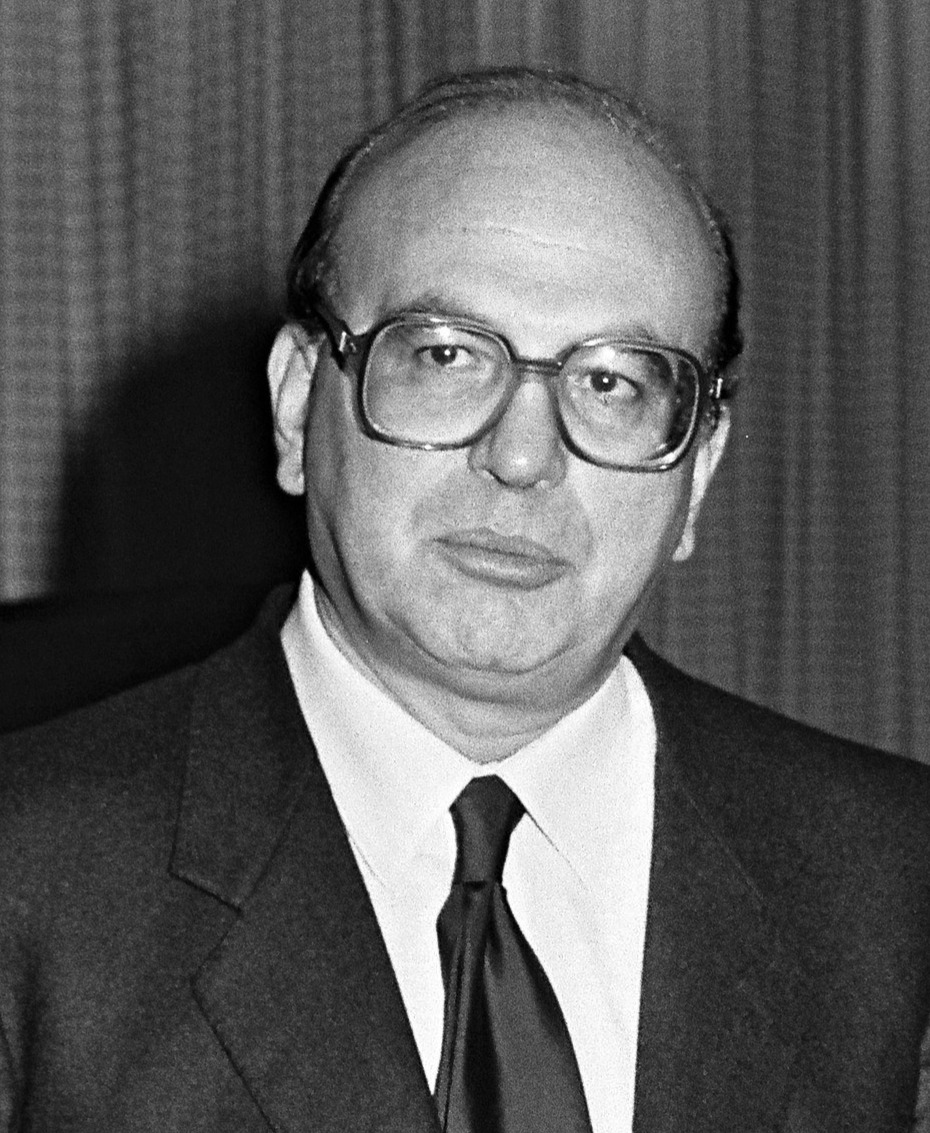

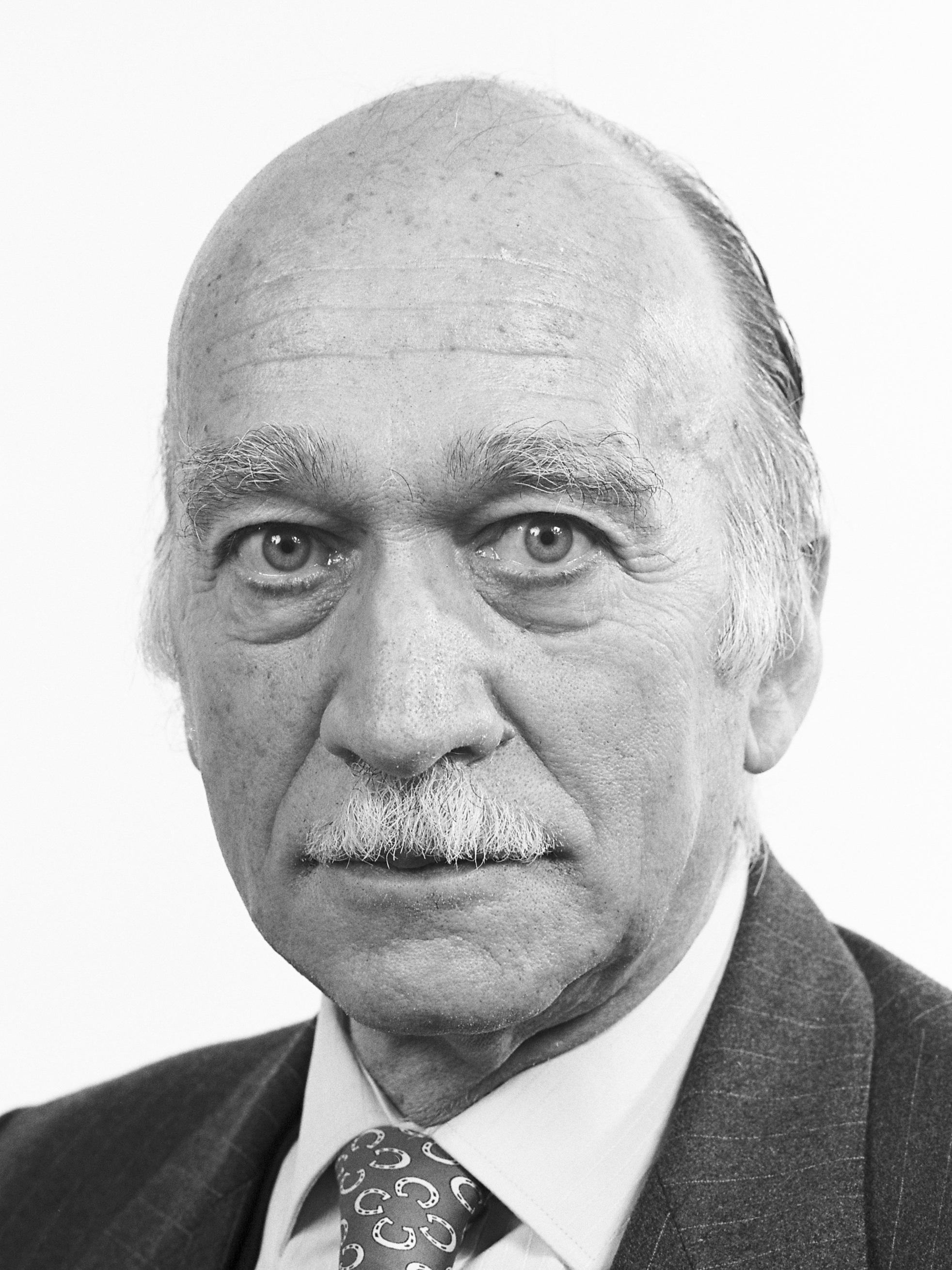

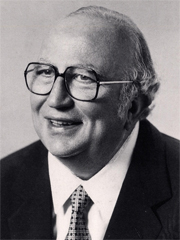

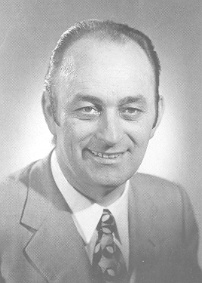
| | First party | Second party | Third party |
|---|---|---|---|
| Leader | Ciriaco De Mita | Alessandro Natta | Bettino Craxi |
| Party | DC | PCI | PSI |
| Leader since | 5 May 1982 | 26 June 1984 | 15 July 1976 |
| Leader's seat | Benevento (C) | Genoa (C) | Milan (C) |
| Seats won | 234 (C) / 125 (S) | 177 (C) / 101 (S) | 94 (C) / 36 (S) |
| Seat change | ▲9 (C) / ▲5 (S) | ▼21 (C) / ▼6 (S) | ▲21 (C) / ▼2 (S) |
| Popular vote | 13,241,188 (C); 10,897,036 (S) | 10,254,591 (C); 9,181,579 (S) | 5,505,690 (C); 3,535,457 (S) |
| Percentage | 34.3% (C); 33.6% (S) | 26.6% (C); 28.3% (S) | 14.3% (C); 10.9% (S) |
| Swing | ▲1.4 pp (C) ▲1.2 pp (S) | ▼3.3 pp (C) ▼2.5 pp (S) | ▲2.9 pp (C) ▼0.5 pp (S) |
| | Fourth party | Fifth party | Sixth party |
| Leader | Giorgio Almirante | Giovanni Spadolini | Franco Nicolazzi |
| Party | MSI | PRI | PSDI |
| Leader since | 29 June 1969 (Note: Almirante also served as secretary from 1948 to 1950.) | 23 September 1979 | 6 October 1985 |
| Leader's seat | Rome (C) | Milan (S) | Rome (C) |
| Seats won | 35 (C) / 16 (S) | 21 (C) / 8 (S) | 17 (C) / 5 (S) |
| Seat change | ▼7 (C) / ▼2 (S) | ▼8 (C) / ▼2 (S) | ▼6 (C) / ▼3 (S) |
| Popular vote | 2,281,126 (C); 2,121,026 (S) | 1,428,663 (C); 1,248,641 (S) | 1,140,209 (C); 764,370 (S) |
| Percentage | 5.9% (C); 6.5% (S) | 3.7% (C); 3.9% (S) | 3.0% (C); 2.4% (S) |
| Swing | ▼0.9 pp (C) ▼0.8 pp (S) | ▼1.4 pp (C) ▼0.8 pp (S) | ▼1.1 pp (C) ▼1.5 pp (S) |
Prime Minister before election
Amintore Fanfani
DC
Prime Minister after the election
Giovanni Goria
DC

General elections were held in Italy on 14–15 June 1987. This election was the first Italian election in which the distance between the Christian Democrats and the Communists grew significantly instead of decreasing. Two parties that had not previously been in parliament won representation: the Greens with thirteen seats, and the Northern League with two.

== Electoral system ==
The pure party-list proportional representation had traditionally become the electoral system for the Chamber of Deputies. Italian provinces were united in 32 constituencies, each electing a group of candidates. At the constituency level, seats were divided between open lists using the largest remainder method with Imperiali quota. Remaining votes and seats were transferred at the national level, where they was divided using the Hare quota, and automatically distributed to best losers into the local lists.

For the Senate, 237 single-seat constituencies were established, even if the assembly had risen to 315 members. The candidates needed a landslide victory of two thirds of votes to be elected, a goal which could be reached only by the German minorities in South Tirol. All remained votes and seats were grouped in party lists and regional constituencies, where a D'Hondt method was used: inside the lists, candidates with the best percentages were elected.

== Historical background ==
In the 1980s, for the first time since 1945, two governments were led by non-Christian Democrat Premiers: the republican Giovanni Spadolini and the socialist Bettino Craxi; the Christian Democracy remained however the main force supporting the government.

With the end of the Years of Lead, the Italian Communist Party gradually increased their votes under the leadership of Enrico Berlinguer. The Socialist party (PSI), led by Craxi, became more and more critical of the communists and of the Soviet Union; Craxi himself pushed in favour of US president Ronald Reagan's positioning of Pershing II missiles in Italy, a move the communists hotly contested.

In June 1984 Berlinguer, the charismatic Communist leader, suddenly left the stage during a speech at a public meeting in Padua: he had suffered a brain haemorrhage, and died three days later. More than a million citizens attended his funeral, one of the biggest in Italy's history. Alessandro Natta was appointed as new party's secretary. The public emotion caused by Berlinguer's death resulted in an extraordinary strength for the Communist Party in the 1984 European election: for the first time in Western Europe since the French election of 1956, and for the first time ever in Italian history, a Communist party received a plurality by a democratic vote.

In 1984, the Craxi government revised the 1927 Lateran Pacts with the Vatican, which concluded the role of Catholicism as Italy's state religion.

During this period, Italy became the fifth-largest industrial nation and gained entry into the G7.

== Parties and leaders ==
| Party | Ideology | Leader | Seats in 1983 | | |
| Party | Ideology | Leader | C | S | Total |
|---|---|---|---|---|---|
| Christian Democracy (DC) | Christian democracy | Ciriaco De Mita | 225 | 120 | 345 |
| Italian Communist Party (PCI) | Eurocommunism | Alessandro Natta | 198 | 107 | 305 |
| Italian Socialist Party (PSI) | Social democracy | Bettino Craxi | 73 | 38 | 111 |
| Italian Social Movement (MSI) | Neo-fascism | Giorgio Almirante | 42 | 18 | 60 |
| Italian Republican Party (PRI) | Liberalism | Giovanni Spadolini | 29 | 11 | 40 |
| Italian Democratic Socialist Party (PSDI) | Social democracy | Franco Nicolazzi | 23 | 8 | 31 |
| Italian Liberal Party (PLI) | Liberalism | Renato Altissimo | 16 | 6 | 22 |
| Radical Party (PR) | Radicalism | Marco Pannella | 11 | 1 | 12 |
| Proletarian Democracy (DP) | Trotskyism | Mario Capanna | 7 | 0 | 7 |
| Federation of Green Lists (FLV) | Green politics | Gianni Francesco Mattioli | New | | |

== Results ==
=== Chamber of Deputies ===
| Party | Votes | % | Seats | +/– |
|---|---|---|---|---|
| Christian Democracy | 13,233,620 | 34.31 | 234 | +9 |
| Italian Communist Party | 10,250,644 | 26.58 | 177 | −21 |
| Italian Socialist Party | 5,501,696 | 14.26 | 94 | +21 |
| Italian Social Movement | 2,281,126 | 5.91 | 35 | −7 |
| Italian Republican Party | 1,428,663 | 3.70 | 21 | −8 |
| Italian Democratic Socialist Party | 1,140,209 | 2.96 | 17 | −6 |
| Radical Party | 987,720 | 2.56 | 13 | +2 |
| Federation of Green Lists | 969,218 | 2.51 | 13 | New |
| Italian Liberal Party | 809,946 | 2.10 | 11 | −5 |
| Proletarian Democracy | 641,901 | 1.66 | 8 | +1 |
| Liga Veneta–United Pensioners | 298,402 | 0.77 | 0 | 0 |
| South Tyrolean People's Party | 202,022 | 0.52 | 3 | 0 |
| Lega Lombarda | 186,255 | 0.48 | 1 | New |
| Sardinian Action Party | 169,978 | 0.44 | 2 | +1 |
| Piedmontese Autonomist Movement | 72,064 | 0.19 | 0 | New |
| Piedmontese Union | 61,701 | 0.16 | 0 | New |
| Hunting – Fishing – Environment | 55,911 | 0.14 | 0 | New |
| Aosta Valley | 41,707 | 0.11 | 1 | 0 |
| DC–PCI–PSI–PSDI | 29,937 | 0.08 | 0 | New |
| Popular Alliance | 25,339 | 0.07 | 0 | New |
| Fiscal Liberation Movement | 25,046 | 0.06 | 0 | New |
| Pensioners' Alliance | 21,342 | 0.06 | 0 | New |
| Italian Green Party–Greens of Europe | 20,916 | 0.05 | 0 | New |
| Veneto Autonomous Region Movement | 18,945 | 0.05 | 0 | New |
| Italian National Movement of Hunters | 14,787 | 0.04 | 0 | New |
| PNI–Hunting and Fishing | 14,306 | 0.04 | 0 | New |
| Friuli Movement | 13,208 | 0.03 | 0 | 0 |
| South Tyrol Party | 11,287 | 0.03 | 0 | 0 |
| Italian Greens–Ecological Party | 10,269 | 0.03 | 0 | New |
| Independentist Party | 9,958 | 0.03 | 0 | New |
| Humanist Alliance | 5,585 | 0.01 | 0 | New |
| New People's Party | 5,055 | 0.01 | 0 | New |
| Justice and Freedom | 4,793 | 0.01 | 0 | 0 |
| Sicilian Renaissance | 2,951 | 0.01 | 0 | New |
| National Party of Tenants | 2,898 | 0.01 | 0 | 0 |
| Movement for the Independence of Trieste | 2,103 | 0.01 | 0 | 0 |
| Total | 38,571,508 | 100.00 | 630 | 0 |
| Valid votes | 38,571,508 | 95.04 | | |
| Invalid/blank votes | 2,015,065 | 4.96 | | |
| Total votes | 40,586,573 | 100.00 | | |
| Registered voters/turnout | 45,692,417 | 88.83 | | |
Source: Ministry of the Interior

Popular vote
| DC | 34.31% |
| PCI | 26.58% |
| PSI | 14.26% |
| MSI | 5.91% |
| PRI | 3.70% |
| PSDI | 2.96% |
| PR | 2.56% |
| FLV | 2.51% |
| PLI | 2.10% |
| DP | 1.66% |
| Others | 3.44% |

Seats
| DC | 37.14% |
| PCI | 28.10% |
| PSI | 14.92% |
| MSI | 5.56% |
| PRI | 3.33% |
| PSDI | 2.70% |
| PR | 2.06% |
| FLV | 2.06% |
| PLI | 1.75% |
| DP | 1.27% |
| Others | 1.11% |

==== Results by constituency ====
| Constituency | Total seats | Seats won | | | | | | | | | | |
| Constituency | Total seats | DC | PCI | PSI | MSI | PRI | PSDI | PR | FLV | PLI | DP | Others |
|---|---|---|---|---|---|---|---|---|---|---|---|---|
| Turin | 34 | 9 | 10 | 5 | 2 | 2 | 1 | 2 | 1 | 1 | 1 | |
| Cuneo | 14 | 6 | 3 | 2 | | 1 | 1 | | | 1 | | |
| Genoa | 21 | 6 | 7 | 3 | 1 | 1 | | 1 | 1 | 1 | | |
| Milan | 48 | 14 | 13 | 9 | 2 | 2 | 1 | 2 | 2 | 1 | 2 | |
| Como | 20 | 7 | 4 | 4 | 1 | 1 | | | 1 | 1 | | 1 |
| Brescia | 21 | 10 | 4 | 3 | 1 | 1 | | | 1 | | 1 | |
| Mantua | 7 | 3 | 3 | 1 | | | | | | | | |
| Trentino | 10 | 3 | 1 | 1 | 1 | | | | 1 | | | 3 |
| Verona | 30 | 14 | 5 | 4 | 1 | 1 | 1 | 1 | 1 | 1 | 1 | |
| Venice | 16 | 7 | 4 | 3 | | | | 1 | 1 | | | |
| Udine | 13 | 5 | 3 | 3 | 1 | | 1 | | | | | |
| Bologna | 26 | 6 | 12 | 3 | 1 | 2 | | 1 | 1 | | | |
| Parma | 20 | 6 | 9 | 3 | 1 | | | | 1 | | | |
| Florence | 14 | 4 | 8 | 2 | | | | | | | | |
| Pisa | 14 | 5 | 6 | 2 | 1 | | | | | | | |
| Siena | 9 | 3 | 5 | 1 | | | | | | | | |
| Ancona | 16 | 6 | 6 | 2 | 1 | 1 | | | | | | |
| Perugia | 12 | 4 | 5 | 2 | 1 | | | | | | | |
| Rome | 54 | 19 | 14 | 7 | 4 | 2 | 2 | 2 | 2 | 1 | 1 | |
| L'Aquila | 15 | 7 | 4 | 2 | 1 | | 1 | | | | | |
| Campobasso | 4 | 3 | 1 | | | | | | | | | |
| Naples | 42 | 17 | 10 | 6 | 3 | 1 | 2 | 1 | | 1 | 1 | |
| Benevento | 19 | 9 | 4 | 3 | 1 | 1 | 1 | | | | | |
| Bari | 25 | 10 | 6 | 4 | 2 | 1 | 1 | | | 1 | | |
| Lecce | 20 | 8 | 5 | 3 | 2 | 1 | 1 | | | | | |
| Potenza | 7 | 4 | 2 | 1 | | | | | | | | |
| Catanzaro | 22 | 9 | 6 | 4 | 1 | 1 | 1 | | | | | |
| Catania | 28 | 11 | 6 | 4 | 3 | 1 | 1 | 1 | | 1 | | |
| Palermo | 27 | 11 | 5 | 4 | 2 | 1 | 1 | 1 | | 1 | 1 | |
| Cagliari | 18 | 7 | 5 | 2 | 1 | | 1 | | | | | 2 |
| Aosta Valley | 1 | | | | | | | | | | | 1 |
| Trieste | 3 | 1 | 1 | 1 | | | | | | | | |
| Total | 630 | 234 | 177 | 94 | 35 | 21 | 17 | 13 | 13 | 11 | 8 | 7 |

=== Senate of the Republic ===
| Party | Votes | % | Seats | +/– |
|---|---|---|---|---|
| Christian Democracy | 10,897,036 | 33.62 | 125 | +5 |
| Italian Communist Party | 9,181,579 | 28.33 | 101 | −6 |
| Italian Socialist Party | 3,535,457 | 10.91 | 36 | −2 |
| Italian Social Movement | 2,121,026 | 6.54 | 16 | −2 |
| Italian Republican Party | 1,248,641 | 3.85 | 8 | −2 |
| PSI–PSDI–PR | 962,215 | 2.97 | 9 | 0 |
| Italian Democratic Socialist Party | 764,370 | 2.36 | 5 | −3 |
| Italian Liberal Party | 700,330 | 2.16 | 3 | –3 |
| Federation of Green Lists | 634,182 | 1.96 | 1 | New |
| Radical Party | 572,461 | 1.77 | 3 | +2 |
| Proletarian Democracy | 493,667 | 1.52 | 1 | +1 |
| Liga Veneta–United Pensioners | 298,552 | 0.92 | 0 | −1 |
| South Tyrolean People's Party | 171,539 | 0.53 | 2 | −1 |
| Lega Lombarda | 137,276 | 0.42 | 1 | New |
| Sardinian Action Party | 124,266 | 0.38 | 1 | 0 |
| Lay-Socialist Alliance (PSI–PSDI–PRI–PLI–PR) (Note: Contested in Sardinia. Paolo Fogu of the PSI was elected.) | 84,883 | 0.26 | 1 | New |
| Piedmontese Autonomist Movement | 60,742 | 0.19 | 0 | New |
| PSI–PSDI–PR–Greens | 58,501 | 0.18 | 1 | 0 |
| Pensioners Popular Alliance | 51,790 | 0.16 | 0 | New |
| Piedmontese Union | 51,340 | 0.16 | 0 | New |
| Molisean Democratic Alliance | 49,297 | 0.15 | 0 | New |
| Hunting – Fishing – Environment | 41,135 | 0.13 | 0 | New |
| Aosta Valley | 35,830 | 0.11 | 1 | 0 |
| DC–PCI–PSI–PSDI–PLI | 25,426 | 0.08 | 0 | New |
| Italian Green Party–Greens of Europe | 22,006 | 0.07 | 0 | New |
| Italian Greens–Ecological Party | 19,127 | 0.06 | 0 | New |
| Friuli Movement | 17,528 | 0.05 | 0 | 0 |
| Fiscal Liberation Movement | 13,915 | 0.04 | 0 | New |
| Independentist Party | 11,818 | 0.04 | 0 | New |
| South Tyrol Party | 8,551 | 0.03 | 0 | New |
| Sicilian Renaissance | 5,258 | 0.02 | 0 | New |
| Sardinian Action Party–Alliance for Federalism | 4,812 | 0.01 | 0 | New |
| National Party of Tenants | 4,103 | 0.01 | 0 | New |
| Italian National Movement of Hunters | 2,695 | 0.01 | 0 | New |
| New People's Party | 2,507 | 0.01 | 0 | New |
| Total | 32,413,861 | 100.00 | 315 | 0 |
| Valid votes | 32,413,861 | 94.17 | | |
| Invalid/blank votes | 2,007,369 | 5.83 | | |
| Total votes | 34,421,230 | 100.00 | | |
| Registered voters/turnout | 38,951,485 | 88.37 | | |
Source: Ministry of the Interior

Popular vote
| DC | 33.62% |
| PCI | 28.33% |
| PSI | 10.91% |
| MSI | 6.54% |
| PRI | 3.85% |
| PSI–PSDI–PR | 2.97% |
| PSDI | 2.36% |
| PLI | 2.16% |
| FLV | 1.96% |
| PR | 1.77% |
| DP | 1.52% |
| Others | 3.62% |

Seats
| DC | 39.68% |
| PCI | 32.06% |
| PSI | 11.43% |
| MSI | 5.08% |
| PSI–PSDI–PR | 2.86% |
| PRI | 2.54% |
| PSDI | 1.59% |
| PLI | 0.95% |
| PR | 0.95% |
| FLV | 0.32% |
| DP | 0.32% |
| Others | 2.22% |

==== Results by constituency ====
| Constituency | Total seats | Seats won | | | | | | | | | | | |
| Constituency | Total seats | DC | PCI | PSI | MSI | PSI–PSDI–PR | PRI | PSDI | PLI | PR | FLV | DP | Others |
|---|---|---|---|---|---|---|---|---|---|---|---|---|---|
| Piedmont | 24 | 8 | 8 | 3 | 1 | | 1 | 1 | 1 | 1 | | | |
| Aosta Valley | 1 | | | | | | | | | | | | 1 |
| Lombardy | 48 | 18 | 12 | 8 | 2 | | 2 | 1 | 1 | 1 | 1 | 1 | 1 |
| Trentino-Alto Adige | 7 | 3 | 1 | | | | | | | | | | 3 |
| Veneto | 23 | 13 | 5 | 4 | 1 | | | | | | | | |
| Friuli-Venezia Giulia | 7 | 3 | 2 | 2 | | | | | | | | | |
| Liguria | 10 | 4 | 4 | | | 2 | | | | | | | |
| Emilia-Romagna | 21 | 6 | 11 | | | 3 | 1 | | | | | | |
| Tuscany | 19 | 6 | 10 | | 1 | 2 | | | | | | | |
| Umbria | 7 | 2 | 4 | 1 | | | | | | | | | |
| Marche | 8 | 3 | 4 | 1 | | | | | | | | | |
| Lazio | 27 | 10 | 9 | 4 | 2 | | 1 | | | 1 | | | |
| Abruzzo | 7 | 4 | 2 | 1 | | | | | | | | | |
| Molise | 2 | 2 | | | | | | | | | | | |
| Campania | 30 | 13 | 8 | 4 | 3 | | 1 | 1 | | | | | |
| Apulia | 21 | 8 | 6 | 3 | 2 | | 1 | 1 | | | | | |
| Basilicata | 7 | 4 | 2 | 1 | | | | | | | | | |
| Calabria | 11 | 4 | 4 | | 1 | 2 | | | | | | | |
| Sicily | 26 | 10 | 6 | 4 | 3 | | 1 | 1 | 1 | | | | |
| Sardinia | 9 | 4 | 3 | | | | | | | | | | 2 |
| Total | 315 | 125 | 101 | 36 | 16 | 9 | 8 | 5 | 3 | 3 | 1 | 1 | 7 |
