= 1983 Italian general election =

- 26 June 1983

All 630 seats in the Chamber of Deputies 316 seats needed for a majority All 315 elective seats in the Senate 162 seats needed for a majority (Note: taking into account the Senators for life, who accounted for 7 seats at the time the election took place)
- Registered: 44,526,357 (C) · 37,603,817 (S)
- Turnout: 39,188,182 (C) · 88.0% (▼2.6 pp); 33,402,139 (S) · 88.8% (▼1.9 pp)
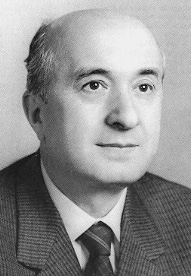

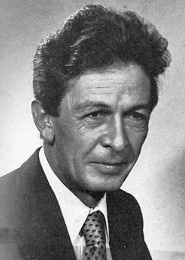

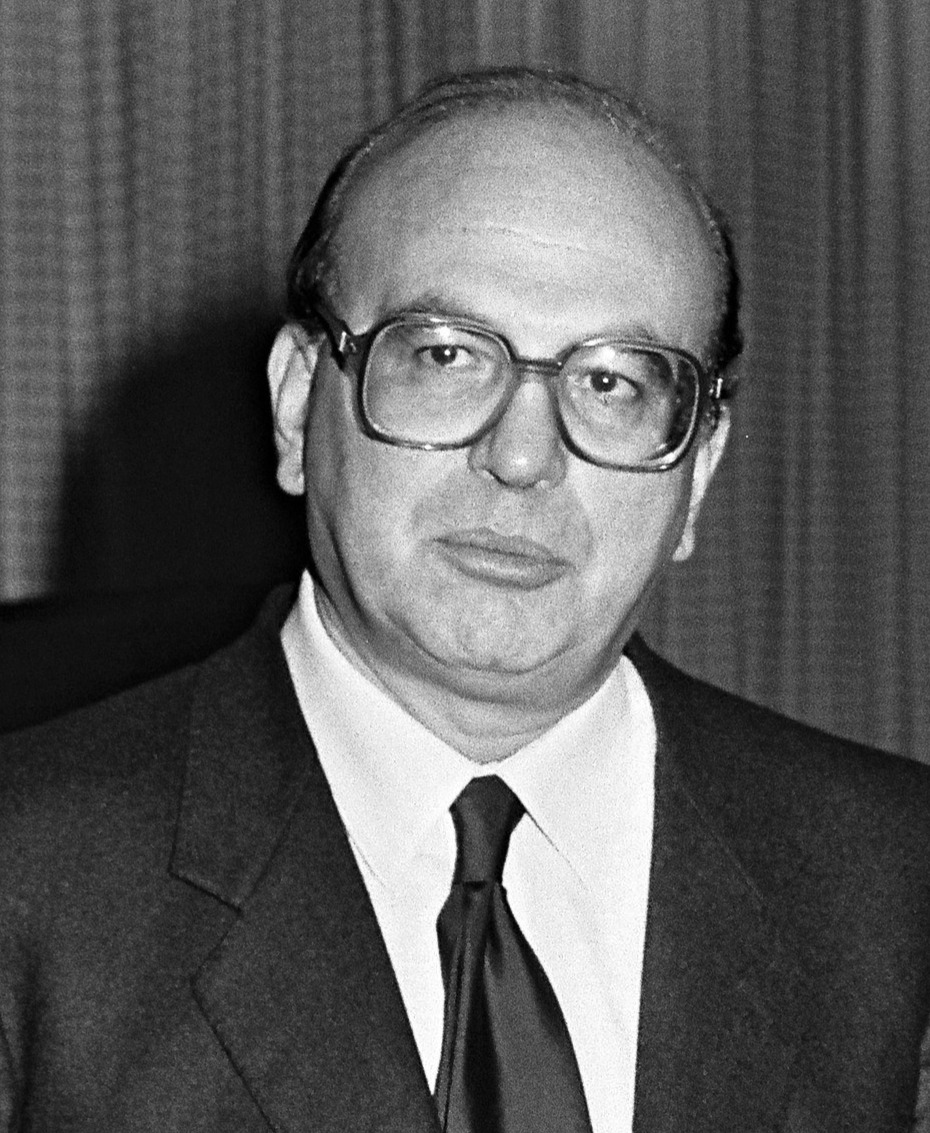

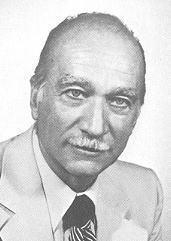

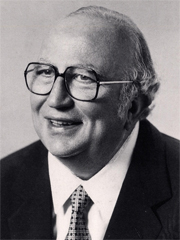

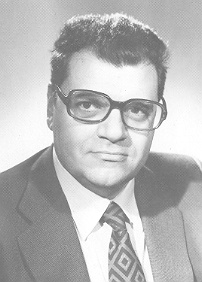
	Majority party	Minority party	Third party
Leader	Ciriaco De Mita	Enrico Berlinguer	Bettino Craxi
Party	DC	PCI	PSI
Leader since	5 May 1982	17 March 1972	15 July 1976
Leader's seat	Benevento (C)	Rome (C)	Milan (C)
Seats won	225 (C) / 120 (S)	198 (C) / 107 (S)	73 (C) / 38 (S)
Seat change	▼37 (C) / ▼18 (S)	▼3 (C) / ▼2 (S)	▲11 (C) / ▲6 (S)
Popular vote	12,153,081 (C); 10,077,204 (S)	11,032,318 (C); 9,577,071 (S)	4,223,362 (C); 3,539,593 (S)
Percentage	32.9% (C); 32.4% (S)	29.9% (C); 30.8% (S)	11.4% (C); 11.4% (S)
Swing	▼5.4 pp (C) ▼5.9 pp (S)	▼0.5 pp (C) ▼0.7 pp (S)	▲1.5 pp (C) ▲1.0 pp (S)
	Fourth party	Fifth party	Sixth party
Leader	Giorgio Almirante	Giovanni Spadolini	Pietro Longo
Party	MSI	PRI	PSDI
Leader since	29 June 1969 (Note: Almirante also served as secretary from 1948 to 1950.)	23 September 1979	20 October 1978
Leader's seat	Rome (C)	Milan (S)	Rome (C)
Seats won	42 (C) / 18 (S)	29 (C) / 10 (S)	23 (C) / 8 (S)
Seat change	▲12 (C) / ▲5 (S)	▲13 (C) / ▲4 (S)	▲3 (C) / ▼1 (S)
Popular vote	2,511,487 (C); 2,283,524 (S)	1,874,512 (C); 1,452,279 (S)	1,508,234 (C); 1,184,936 (S)
Percentage	6.8% (C); 7.4% (S)	5.1% (C); 4.7% (S)	4.1% (C); 3.8% (S)
Swing	▲1.6 pp (C) ▲1.7 pp (S)	▲2.1 pp (C) ▲1.3 pp (S)	▲0.3 pp (C) ▼0.4 pp (S)
Prime Minister before election
Amintore Fanfani
DC
Prime Minister after the election
Bettino Craxi
PSI

The 1983 Italian general election was held in Italy on 26 June 1983. The Pentapartito formula, the governative alliance between five centrist parties, caused unexpected problems to Christian Democracy. The alliance was fixed and universal, extended both to the national government and to the local administrations. Considering that the election result did no longer depend on the strength of the DC, but the strength of the entire Pentapartito, centrist electors began to look at the Christian Democratic vote as not necessary to prevent a Communist success. Moreover, voting for one of the four minor parties of the alliance was seen as a form of moderate protest against the government without giving advantages to the PCI. Other minor effects of this election were a reduction of the referendarian Radical Party and the appearance of some regional forces.

== Electoral system ==
The pure party-list proportional representation had traditionally become the electoral system for the Chamber of Deputies. Italian provinces were united in 32 constituencies, each electing a group of candidates. At constituency level, seats were divided between open lists using the largest remainder method with Imperiali quota. Remaining votes and seats were transferred at national level, where they were divided using the Hare quota, and automatically distributed to best losers into the local lists.

For the Senate, 237 single-seat constituencies were established, even if the assembly had risen to 315 members. The candidates needed a landslide victory of two thirds of votes to be elected, a goal which could be reached only by the German minorities in South Tirol. All remained votes and seats were grouped in party lists and regional constituencies, where a D'Hondt method was used: inside the lists, candidates with the best percentages were elected.

== Historical background ==
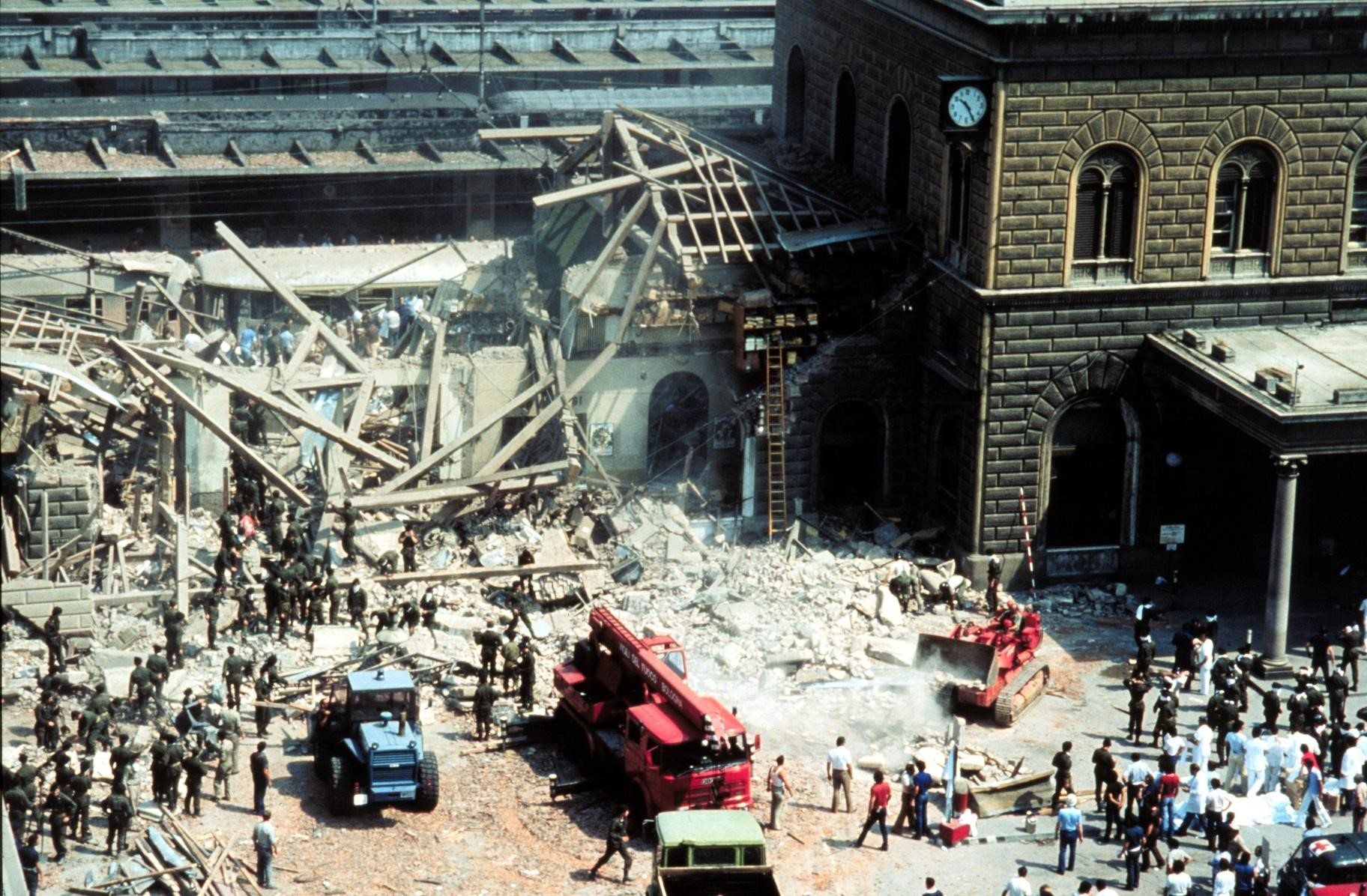
Rescue teams making their way through the rubble after the explosion in Bologna.

On 2 August 1980, a bomb killed 85 people and wounded more than 200 in Bologna. Known as the Bologna massacre, the blast destroyed a large portion of the city's railway station. This was found to be a fascist bombing, mainly organized by the NAR, who had ties with the Roman criminal organization Banda della Magliana. In the following days the central square of Bologna, Piazza Maggiore, hosted large-scale demonstrations of indignation and protest among the population, in which were not spared harsh criticism and protests addressed to government representatives, who attended the funerals of the victims celebrated in the San Petronio Basilica on 6 August.

In 1981 at a meeting of the Congress of the Italian Socialist Party (PSI), was officially launched a centrist political alliance called Pentapartito, when the Christian Democrat Arnaldo Forlani and Socialist Secretary Bettino Craxi signed an agreement with the "blessing" of Giulio Andreotti. Because the agreement was signed in a trailer, it was called the "pact of the camper." The pact was also called "CAF" for the initials of the signers, Craxi-Andreotti-Forlani. With this agreement, the DC party recognized the equal dignity of the so-called "secular parties" of the majority (i.e., the Socialists, Social Democrats, Liberals and Republicans) and also guaranteed an alternation of government (in fact, Giovanni Spadolini of the PRI and Bettino Craxi of the PSI became the first non-Christian Democrats to hold the Presidency of the Council). With the birth of the Pentapartito, the possibility of the growth of the majority toward the Italian Communist Party (PCI) was finally dismissed. The Christian Democrats remained the leaders of the coalition, and managed several times to prevent representatives of the secular parties from becoming President of the Council.

== Parties and leaders ==
Party	Ideology	Leader	Seats in 1979		
Party	Ideology	Leader	C	S	Total
Christian Democracy (DC)	Christian democracy	Ciriaco De Mita	262	138	400
Italian Communist Party (PCI)	Eurocommunism	Enrico Berlinguer	201	109	310
Italian Socialist Party (PSI)	Social democracy	Bettino Craxi	62	32	94
Italian Social Movement (MSI)	Neo-fascism	Giorgio Almirante	30	13	43
Italian Democratic Socialist Party (PSDI)	Social democracy	Pietro Longo	20	9	29
Italian Republican Party (PRI)	Liberalism	Giovanni Spadolini	16	6	22
Radical Party (PR)	Radicalism	Marco Pannella	18	2	20
Italian Liberal Party (PLI)	Liberalism	Valerio Zanone	9	2	11
Proletarian Democracy (DP)	Trotskyism	Mario Capanna	Did not run		

== Results ==
The DC respected the pact of an alternance of leadership between the parties of the alliance and accepted the Socialist secretary, Bettino Craxi, as the new Prime Minister of Italy. The Christian Democrats hoped that their minor responsibility could drive away some popular discontent from their party. The Italian Socialist Party so arrived to the highest office of the government for the first time in history. Differently from the DC, which had an oligarchic structure, the PSI was strongly ruled by its secretary, so the Craxi's premiership resulted the longest one without any political crisis in post-war Italy, despite some international tensions with the United States about the Palestine Liberation Organization. Craxi formed a renewed government in 1986, but could not survive in 1987 to a dispute with DC's secretary Ciriaco De Mita, who was searching and effectively obtained an early national election, ruled by an electoral Christian Democratic government with old Amintore Fanfani as PM.

=== Chamber of Deputies ===
Party	Votes	%	Seats	+/–
Christian Democracy	12,153,081	32.93	225	−37
Italian Communist Party	11,032,318	29.89	198	−3
Italian Socialist Party	4,223,362	11.44	73	+11
Italian Social Movement	2,511,487	6.81	42	+12
Italian Republican Party	1,874,512	5.08	29	+13
Italian Democratic Socialist Party	1,508,234	4.09	23	+3
Italian Liberal Party	1,066,980	2.89	16	+7
Radical Party	809,810	2.19	11	−7
Proletarian Democracy	542,039	1.47	7	+7
Pensioners' National Party	503,461	1.36	0	New
South Tyrolean People's Party	184,940	0.50	3	−1
Liga Veneta	125,311	0.34	1	New
List for Trieste	92,101	0.25	0	−1
Sardinian Action Party	91,923	0.25	1	+1
Aosta Valley (UV–UVP–DP)	28,086	0.08	1	0
Friuli Movement	26,190	0.07	0	0
Trentino Tyrolean People's Party	18,656	0.05	0	New
Pensioners' Defence Union	15,182	0.04	0	New
Monarchist National Party	13,573	0.04	0	New
South Tyrol Party	12,270	0.03	0	New
Union of Pensioners and Retirees of Italy	9,944	0.03	0	New
Slovene Union	9,434	0.03	0	New
European Workers' Party	8,074	0.02	0	0
Struggle List	6,863	0.02	0	New
Christian Social Action Party	6,354	0.02	0	0
Living Liberation	5,257	0.01	0	New
Sicilian National Front	5,228	0.01	0	0
National Party of Tenants	4,768	0.01	0	New
Sardinian Ecological Movement	4,263	0.01	0	New
PLI–PRI–PSDI	4,239	0.01	0	New
Movement for the Independence of Trieste	2,913	0.01	0	New
New Left	1,853	0.01	0	New
Justice and Freedom	1,692	0.00	0	New
Popular Christian Movement	1,607	0.00	0	0
Total	36,906,005	100.00	630	0
Valid votes	36,906,005	94.18		
Invalid/blank votes	2,282,177	5.82		
Total votes	39,188,182	100.00		
Registered voters/turnout	44,526,357	88.01		
Source: Ministry of the Interior

Popular vote
DC	32.93%
PCI	29.89%
PSI	11.44%
MSI	6.81%
PRI	5.08%
PSDI	4.09%
PLI	2.89%
PR	2.19%
DP	1.47%
PNP	1.36%
Others	1.84%

Seats
DC	35.71%
PCI	31.43%
PSI	11.59%
MSI	6.67%
PRI	4.60%
PSDI	3.65%
PLI	2.54%
PR	1.75%
DP	1.11%
Others	0.95%

==== Results by constituency ====
Constituency	Total seats	Seats won									
Constituency	Total seats	DC	PCI	PSI	MSI	PRI	PSDI	PLI	PR	DP	Others
Turin	36	9	12	4	2	3	2	2	1	1	
Cuneo	14	6	4	1		1	1	1			
Genoa	20	6	8	2	1	1		1	1		
Milan	51	14	16	6	3	4	2	2	2	2	
Como	20	8	5	2	1	1	1	1	1		
Brescia	23	10	5	2	1	1	1	1	1	1	
Mantua	7	3	3	1							
Trentino	8	3	1	1							3
Verona	30	14	6	3	1	1	1	1	1	1	1
Venice	16	7	4	2	1	1	1				
Udine	14	6	3	2	1	1	1				
Bologna	26	5	13	2	1	2	1	1	1		
Parma	20	5	10	2	1	1	1				
Florence	16	4	9	2		1					
Pisa	15	4	7	2	1	1					
Siena	9	3	5	1							
Ancona	17	6	7	2	1	1					
Perugia	10	3	5	1	1						
Rome	53	17	16	5	5	3	2	2	2	1	
L'Aquila	14	7	5	1	1						
Campobasso	4	3	1								
Naples	42	14	11	5	6	1	2	1	1	1	
Benevento	18	9	4	3	1		1				
Bari	25	9	6	4	3	1	1	1			
Lecce	20	8	5	3	2	1	1				
Potenza	7	4	2	1							
Catanzaro	23	9	6	4	2	1	1				
Catania	27	11	6	4	3	1	1	1			
Palermo	25	11	6	3	2	1	1	1			
Cagliari	17	6	6	2	1		1				1
Aosta Valley	1										1
Trieste	2	1	1								
Total	630	225	198	73	42	29	23	16	11	7	6

=== Senate of the Republic ===
Party	Votes	%	Seats	+/–
Christian Democracy	10,077,204	32.41	120	−18
Italian Communist Party	9,577,071	30.81	107	−2
Italian Socialist Party	3,539,593	11.39	38	+6
Italian Social Movement	2,283,524	7.35	18	+5
Italian Republican Party	1,452,279	4.67	10	+4
Italian Democratic Socialist Party	1,184,936	3.81	8	−1
Italian Liberal Party	834,771	2.69	6	+4
Radical Party	548,229	1.76	1	−1
Pensioners' National Party	370,756	1.19	0	New
Proletarian Democracy	327,750	1.05	0	New
South Tyrolean People's Party	157,444	0.51	3	0
PLI–PRI	127,504	0.41	1	0
PLI–PRI–PSDI	100,218	0.32	0	0
Liga Veneta	91,171	0.29	1	New
List for Trieste	85,542	0.28	0	0
Sardinian Action Party	76,797	0.25	1	+1
PLI–PSDI	72,298	0.23	0	0
For the Renewal of Molise	33,525	0.11	0	New
List for Trieste–PPPIU	27,940	0.09	0	0
Aosta Valley (UV–UVP–DP)	26,547	0.09	1	0
Friuli Movement	23,847	0.08	0	0
Trentino Tyrolean People's Party	17,354	0.06	0	New
Christian Social Action Party	12,588	0.04	0	New
Union of Pensioners and Retirees of Italy	10,895	0.04	0	New
Slovene Union	8,904	0.03	0	New
Sicilian National Front	8,243	0.03	0	New
Struggle Front	6,403	0.02	0	New
List for Trieste–UDP	5,678	0.02	0	0
Total	31,089,011	100.00	315	0
Valid votes	31,089,011	93.07		
Invalid/blank votes	2,313,128	6.93		
Total votes	33,402,139	100.00		
Registered voters/turnout	37,603,817	88.83		
Source: Ministry of the Interior

Popular vote
DC	32.41%
PCI	30.81%
PSI	11.39%
MSI	7.35%
PRI	4.67%
PSDI	3.81%
PLI	2.69%
PR	1.76%
PNP	1.19%
DP	1.05%
Others	2.87%

Seats
DC	38.10%
PCI	33.97%
PSI	12.06%
MSI	5.71%
PRI	3.17%
PSDI	2.54%
PLI	1.90%
PR	0.32%
Others	2.22%

==== Results by constituency ====
Constituency	Total seats	Seats won								
Constituency	Total seats	DC	PCI	PSI	MSI	PRI	PSDI	PLI	PR	Others
Piedmont	24	7	8	3	1	2	1	2		
Aosta Valley	1									1
Lombardy	48	17	15	6	2	3	2	2	1	
Trentino-Alto Adige	7	3	1							3
Veneto	23	12	5	2	1	1	1			1
Friuli-Venezia Giulia	7	4	2	1						
Liguria	10	4	5	1						
Emilia-Romagna	21	6	12	2		1				
Tuscany	19	6	10	2						1
Umbria	7	2	4	1						
Marche	8	3	4	1						
Lazio	27	9	9	3	3	1	1	1		
Abruzzo	7	4	2	1						
Molise	2	2								
Campania	29	11	9	4	4	1	1			
Apulia	20	8	6	3	3		1			
Basilicata	7	4	2	1						
Calabria	11	4	4	2	1					
Sicily	26	10	6	4	3	1	1	1		
Sardinia	8	4	3	1						1
Total	315	120	107	38	18	10	8	6	1	7
