= Franco Nicolazzi =

Italian politician (1924–2015)

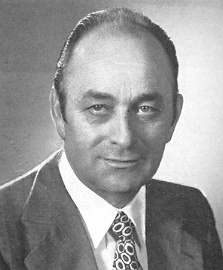

Secretary of the Italian Democratic Socialist Party
- In office 1985–1988
- Preceded by: Pietro Longo
- Succeeded by: Antonio Cariglia

Minister of Public Works
- In office 4 August 1979 – 4 April 1980
- Prime Minister: Francesco Cossiga
- Preceded by: Francesco Compagna
- Succeeded by: Francesco Compagna
- In office 18 October 1980 – 17 April 1987
- Prime Minister: Arnaldo Forlani; Giovanni Spadolini; Amintore Fanfani; Bettino Craxi
- Preceded by: Francesco Compagna
- Succeeded by: Giuseppe Zamberletti

Minister of Industry, Commerce and Craftsmanship
- In office 20 March 1979 – 4 August 1979
- Prime Minister: Giulio Andreotti
- Preceded by: Romano Prodi
- Succeeded by: Antonio Bisaglia

Member of the Chamber of Deputies
- In office 16 May 1963 – 22 April 1992

Personal details
- Born: 10 April 1924 Gattico, Piedmont, Italy
- Died: 22 January 2015 (aged 90) Arona, Piedmont, Italy
- Party: PSDI
- Profession: Politician, teacher

Franco Nicolazzi (10 April 1924 – 22 January 2015) was an Italian politician.

Nicolazzi was born in Gattico, in the province of Novara. During World War II he fought against the German occupation of Italy with the Brigate Matteotti. He was one of the founders of the Italian Democratic Socialist Party (Partito Socialista Democratico Italiano, PSDI) in 1948, an offshoot of the Italian Socialist Party (PSI) whose members were against the decision to ally with the Italian Communist Party (PCI) in advance of the 1948 general election.

Nicolazzi was a member of the Italian Parliament from 1963 to 1992. He served as Minister of Industry in 1979 and then as Minister of Public Works in various administrations from 1979 to 1987. His main initiative as public works minister was repealing the law that prohibited the construction of new motorways (autostrade) in Italy, later promoting the construction of new road works such as the Voltri-Gravellona Toce motorway and the expansion of the Milan ring road.

In 1985, Nicolazzi was appointed national secretary (i.e., leader) of the PSDI following the resignation of Pietro Longo. Although he tried to move the party leftwards, a significant number of the party's members in Milan and other places defected to the PSI during his tenure, especially after he started bitterly criticising the PSI's leader, Bettino Craxi, in the aftermath of the 1987 general election. He was replaced as leader by Antonio Cariglia in 1988.

In the late 1980s, Nicolazzi was accused, in his capacity as public works minister, of taking bribes from construction firms competing for contracts to build new prisons (the so-called "golden prisons" scandal). He retired from political activity after his encroachment in the Tangentopoli ("bribesville") affair, in which he was condemned to a one-year residence order.

From 2006 until his death, he was the President of the Giuseppe Saragat Foundation. In 2007, he joined the Movement of Social Democratic Rebirth, a minor party founded by his erstwhile PSDI colleague Luigi Preti. Social Democratic Rebirth was renamed Party of Social Democrats upon Nicolazzi's arrival, and when his and Preti's factions subsequently split, it was the Nicolazzi group that kept the Party of Social Democrats moniker while the Preti group readopted the name Social Democratic Rebirth.

Nicolazzi died on 22 January 2015, aged 90.

Party political offices
Preceded by Pietro Longo	Secretary of the Italian Democratic Socialist Party; 1985–1988	Succeeded by Antonio Cariglia
