= List of heads of state of Italy =

This is a list of the heads of state of Italy. The first to take the title was Odoacer, a barbarian military leader, in the late 5th century, followed by the Ostrogothic kings up to the mid-6th century. With the Frankish conquest of Italy in the 8th century, the Carolingians assumed the title, which was maintained by subsequent Holy Roman Emperors throughout the Middle Ages. The last Emperor to claim the title was Charles V in the 16th century. During this period, the holders of the title were crowned with the Iron Crown of Lombardy.

From the unification of Italy in 1861 to 1946 the head of state was the King of Italy, who was the same person as the King of Sardinia according to the Constitution. Italy became a republic under the Constitution of 1948 and the monarch was replaced by a President.

== Monarchs ==
=== As "Rex Italiae" ===
- Odoacer (476–493)

vassal of the Eastern Roman Empire.

=== Ostrogothic Kingdom (493 – 553) ===
- Theoderic the Great (493 – 526)
- Athalaric (526 – 534)
- Theodahad (534 – 536)
- Witiges (536 – 540)
- Ildibad (540 – 541)
- Eraric (541)
- Totila (541 – 552)
- Teia (552 – 553)

=== Kingdom of the Lombards (568 – 814) ===
- Alboin (568 – 572)
- Cleph (572 – 574)
- Rule of the dukes (ten-year interregnum)
- Authari (584 – 590)
- Agilulf (591 – c. 616)
- Adaloald (c. 616 – c. 626)
- Arioald (c. 626 – 636)
- Rothari (636 – 652)
- Rodoald (652 – 653)
- Aripert I (653 – 661)
- Perctarit and Godepert (661 – 662)
- Grimoald (662 – 671)
- Perctarit (671 – 688), restored from exile
- Alahis (688 – 689), rebel
- Cunincpert (688 – 700)
- Liutpert (700 – 701)
- Raginpert (701)
- Aripert II (701 – 712)
- Ansprand (712)
- Liutprand (712 – 744)
- Hildeprand (744)
- Ratchis (744 – 749)
- Aistulf (749 – 756)
- Desiderius (756 – 774)
- Charlemagne (774 – 814)

=== Kingdom of Italy (781 – 962) ===
==== Carolingian dynasty (781 – 888) ====
- Pippin (781 – 810)
- Bernard (810 – 818)
- Louis I (818 – 822)
- Lothair I (822 – 855)
- Louis II (844 – 875)
- Charles II the Bald (875 – 877)
- Carloman (877 – 879)
- Charles III the Fat (879 – 887)

==== Instability (888 – 962) ====
After 887, Italy fell into instability, with many rulers claiming the kingship simultaneously:

- Berengar I (888 – 896)

vassal of the German King Arnulf of Carinthia, reduced to Friuli 889-894, deposed by Arnulf in 896.

- Guy of Spoleto (889 – 894)

opponent of Berengar, ruled most of Italy but was deposed by Arnulf.

- Lambert of Spoleto (891 – 896)

subking of his father Guy before 894, reduced to Spoleto 894–895.

- Arnulf of Carinthia (894 – 899)
  - Ratold (sub-king 896)

In 896, Arnulf and Ratold lost control of Italy, which was divided between Berengar and Lambert:

- Berengar I (896 – 924)

seized Lambert's portion upon the latter's death in 898.

- Lambert of Spoleto (896 – 898)
- Louis III of Provence (900-905)

opposed Berengar 900-902 and 905.

- Rudolph II of Burgundy (922 – 933)

defeated Berengar but fled Italy in 926.

- Hugh of Arles (926 – 947)

elected by Berengar's partisans in 925, resigned to Provence after 945.

- Lothair II of Arles (945 – 950)
- Berengar II of Ivrea (950 – 961)

jointly with his son:

- Adalbert of Ivrea (950 – 961)

In 951 Otto I of Germany invaded Italy and was crowned with the Iron Crown of Lombardy. In 952, Berengar and Adalbert became his vassals but remained kings until being deposed by Otto.

=== Holy Roman Empire (962 – 1556) ===
==== Ottonian dynasty (962 – 1024) ====
Image	Name	Life	Coronation	Ceased to be King
	Otto I	23 November 912 - 7 May 973	962	7 May 973
	Otto II	955 - 7 December 983	c. October 980	7 December 983
	Otto III	980 - 23 January 1002	c. February 996	23 January 1002
	Arduin	955 - 1015	1002	1014
	Henry II	6 May 973 - 13 July 1024	1004	13 July 1024

==== Salian dynasty (1027 – 1125) ====
Image	Name	Life	Coronation	Ceased to be King
	Conrad I	990 - 4 June 1039	1026	4 June 1039
	Henry III	29 October 1017 - 5 October 1056	1039	5 October 1056
	Henry IV	11 November 1050 - 7 August 1106	1056	December 1105
	Conrad II of Italy	1074 - 1101	1093	1101
	Henry V	8 November 1086 - 23 May 1125	1106	23 May 1125

==== Süpplingenburg dynasty (1125 – 1137) ====
Image	Name	Life	Coronation	Ceased to be King
	Lothair III	9 June 1075 - 4 December 1137	1125	4 December 1137

==== Hauteville dynasty (1130 – 1154) ====
Roger II used the title King of Sicily and Italy until at least 1135; later he used only the title King of Sicily, Apulia and Calabria. Although his realm included the southern Italian mainland, he never exerted any control over the official Kingdom of Italy, and none of his successors claimed the title King of Italy.

Image	Name	Life	Coronation	Ceased to be King
	Roger II	22 December 1095 - 26 February 1154	25 December 1130	26 February 1154

==== House of Hohenstaufen (1128 – 1197) ====
Image	Name	Life	Coronation	Ceased to be King
	Conrad III	1093 - 15 February 1152	1138 (Also crowned in 1128 in opposition to Lothair)	1152
	Frederick I	1122 - 10 June 1190	1154	1186
	Henry VI	November 1165 - 28 September 1197	1186	28 September 1197

==== House of Welf (1208 – 1212) ====
Image	Name	Life	Coronation	Ceased to be King
	Otto IV	1175 or 1176 - 19 May 1218	1209	1212

==== House of Hohenstaufen (1212 – 1254) ====
Image	Coat of Arms	Name	Life	Coronation	Ceased to be King
		Frederick II (Friedrich II)	26 December 1194 – 13 December 1250	5 December 1212	13 December 1250
		Henry (Heinrich (VII))	1211 – 12 February 1242	23 April 1220	12 February 1242
		Conrad IV (Konrad IV)	25 April 1228 – 21 May 1254	May 1237	21 May 1254

==== House of Luxembourg (1311 – 1313) ====
Image	Coat of Arms	Name	Life	Coronation	Ceased to be King
		Henry VII	1275 - 24 August 1313	6 January 1311	24 August 1313

==== House of Wittelsbach (1327 – 1347) ====
Image	Coat of Arms	Name	Life	Coronation	Ceased to be King
		Louis IV	1 April 1282 - 11 October 1347	1327	11 October 1347

==== House of Luxembourg (1355 – 1437) ====
Image	Coat of Arms	Name	Life	Coronation	Ceased to be King
		Charles IV	14 May 1316 - 29 November 1378	1355	29 November 1378
		Sigismund	14 February 1368 - 9 December 1437	1431	9 December 1437

==== House of Habsburg (1437 – 1556) ====
Image	Coat of Arms	Name	Life	Coronation	Ceased to be King
		Frederick III	21 September 1415 - 19 August 1493	16 March 1452	19 August 1493
		Charles V	24 February 1500 - 21 September 1558	24 February 1530	16 January 1556

Charles V was the last emperor to be crowned king of Italy, or to officially use the title. The Habsburg emperors claimed the Italian crown until 1801. The empire continued to include Italian territories until its dissolution in 1806.

=== Kingdom of Italy (1805–1814), House of Bonaparte ===
Image	Coat of Arms	Name	Life	Coronation	Ceased to be King
		Napoleon I	15 August 1769 - 5 May 1821	17 March 1805	11 April 1814

=== Full title ===
This title is present on Italian laws proclaimed by Napoleon I:

[Name], by the Grace of God and the Constitutions, Emperor of the French and King of Italy.

=== Kingdom of Italy (1861–1946), House of Savoy ===
The succession to the throne of Italy was the same as the succession to the throne of the Sardinia.

Monarch			Reign			Position	Royal House
#	Portrait	Name	Reign start	Reign end	Duration	Position	Royal House
1		Victor Emmanuel II (1820–1878)	17 March 1861	9 January 1878	16 years, 298 days	King of Italy	House of Savoy
2		Umberto I (1844–1900)	9 January 1878	29 July 1900	22 years, 201 days	King of Italy	House of Savoy
3		Victor Emmanuel III (1869–1947)	29 July 1900	9 May 1946 (Abdicated)	45 years, 284 days	King of Italy; Emperor of Ethiopia (1936–1941); King of Albania (1939–1943)	House of Savoy
4		Umberto II (1904–1983)	9 May 1946	12 June 1946 (Deposed)	40 days	King of Italy	House of Savoy

== Provisional head of state ==
After the constitutional referendum which took place at the same time as the general election 54.3% voted for a republic. The Constituent Assembly which had the power to rule Italy until a new constitution for the republic was drawn up. The provisional Head of State after Alcide De Gasperi who exercised the powers after the King of Italy left was Enrico De Nicola who was proclaimed in 1946 but he was called Temporary Chief of State because he did not want to be called President of the Republic until the constitution was law.

No.	Portrait	Name	Term	Tenure		Election Year Voter Percentage
—		Alcide De Gasperi (1881–1954)	—	12 June 1946	1 July 1946	—
—		Alcide De Gasperi (1881–1954)	He exercised the powers of Provisional Head of State as Prime Minister between the departure of King Umberto II on 12 June 1946, and the proclamation of Enrico De Nicola as Head of State by the Constituent Assembly			
1		Enrico De Nicola (1877–1959)	1	1 July 1946	25 June 1947	1946 — 78.57% 396
1		Enrico De Nicola (1877–1959)	2	26 June 1947	1 January 1948	1947 — 93.96% 405

== Presidents ==
Under the Constitution, the first constitution of the Republic of Italy, the President replaced the monarch as ceremonial head of state. The President was elected by Parliament and Regional governments for a seven-year term. In the event of a vacancy the President of the Senate served as Acting President.

Parties

Traditionally, Presidents have not been members of any political party during their tenure, in order to be considered above partisan interests. The parties shown are those to which the President belonged at the time they took office.

- 1946–1993:

Christian Democracy Democratic Party Democratic Socialist Party Liberal Party Socialist Party

- Since 1994:

Democrats of the Left Democratic Party Independent

Status

Denotes President of the Senate acting as President

No.	Portrait	Name	Term	Tenure		Election Year Voter Percentage
1		Enrico De Nicola (1877–1959)	2	1 January 1948	12 May 1948	1947 — 93.96% 405
2		Luigi Einaudi (1874–1961)	1	12 May 1948	11 May 1955	1948 — 59.40% 518
3		Giovanni Gronchi (1887–1978)	1	11 May 1955	11 May 1962	1955 — 78.90% 658
4		Antonio Segni (1891–1972)	1	11 May 1962	6 December 1964	1962 — 52.60% 443
4		Antonio Segni (1891–1972)	Resigned			
—		Cesare Merzagora (1898–1991)	—	6 December 1964	29 December 1964	—
—		Cesare Merzagora (1898–1991)	As President of the Senate he acted as President until after the 1964 presidential election			
5		Giuseppe Saragat (1898–1988)	1	29 December 1964	29 December 1971	1964 — 68.90% 646
6		Giovanni Leone (1908–2001)	1	29 December 1971	15 June 1978	1971 — 52.00% 518
6		Giovanni Leone (1908–2001)	Resigned			
—		Amintore Fanfani (1908–1999)	—	15 June 1978	9 July 1978	—
—		Amintore Fanfani (1908–1999)	As President of the Senate he acted as President until after the 1978 presidential election			
7		Sandro Pertini (1896–1990)	1	9 July 1978	29 June 1985	1978 — 83.61% 832
7		Sandro Pertini (1896–1990)	Resigned			
8		Francesco Cossiga (1928–2010)	—	29 June 1985	3 July 1985	—
8		Francesco Cossiga (1928–2010)	1	3 July 1985	28 April 1992	1985 — 75.20% 754
8		Francesco Cossiga (1928–2010)	As President of the Senate he acted as President until after the 1985 presidential election which he won. Resigned			
—		Giovanni Spadolini (1925–1994)	—	28 April 1992	28 May 1992	—
—		Giovanni Spadolini (1925–1994)	As President of the Senate he acted as President until after the 1992 presidential election			
9		Oscar Luigi Scalfaro (1918–2012)	1	28 May 1992	15 May 1999	1992 — 67.06% 672
9		Oscar Luigi Scalfaro (1918–2012)	Resigned			
—		Nicola Mancino (1931–)	—	15 May 1999	18 May 1999	—
—		Nicola Mancino (1931–)	As President of the Senate he acted as President until after the 1999 presidential election			
10		Carlo Azeglio Ciampi (1920–2016)	1	18 May 1999	15 May 2006	1999 — 71.41% 707
10		Carlo Azeglio Ciampi (1920–2016)	Resigned			
11		Giorgio Napolitano (1925–2023)	1	15 May 2006	20 April 2013	2006 — 54.85% 543
11		Giorgio Napolitano (1925–2023)	2	20 April 2013	14 January 2015	2013 — 74.10% 738
11		Giorgio Napolitano (1925–2023)	Resigned			
—		Pietro Grasso (1945–)	—	14 January 2015	3 February 2015	—
—		Pietro Grasso (1945–)	As President of the Senate he acted as President until after the 2015 presidential election			
12		Sergio Mattarella (1941–)	1	3 February 2015	Incumbent	2015 — 65.91% 665

== Styles ==
Country	Years	Title of Head of State
Kingdom	1861	King of Italy; Re d'Italia
Kingdom	1861 – 1936	By the Grace of God and by the Will of the Nation King of Italy; Con la grazia di Dio e per la Volontà della Nazione Re d'Italia
Kingdom	1936 – 1939	By the Grace of God and by the Will of the Nation King of Italy, Emperor of Ethiopia; Con la grazia di Dio e per la Volontà della Nazione Re d'Italia, Imperatore d'Etiopia
Kingdom	1939 – 1943	By the Grace of God and by the Will of the Nation King of Italy and of Albania, Emperor of Ethiopia; Con la grazia di Dio e per la Volontà della Nazione Re d'Italia e di Albania, Imperatore d'Etiopia
Kingdom	1943 – 1946	By the Grace of God and by the Will of the Nation King of Italy; Con la grazia di Dio e per la Volontà della Nazione Re d'Italia
Kingdom	1946	King of Italy; Re d'Italia
Republic	1946 – 1948	Temporary Chief of State; Capo provvisorio dello Stato
Republic	1948 – present	President of the Italian Republic; Presidente della Repubblica Italiana
