= List of presidents of Italy =

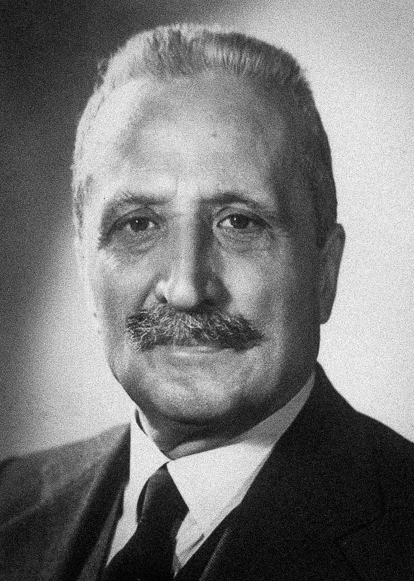
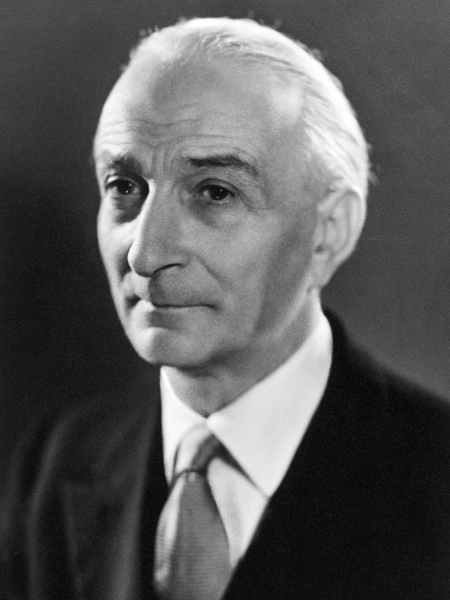
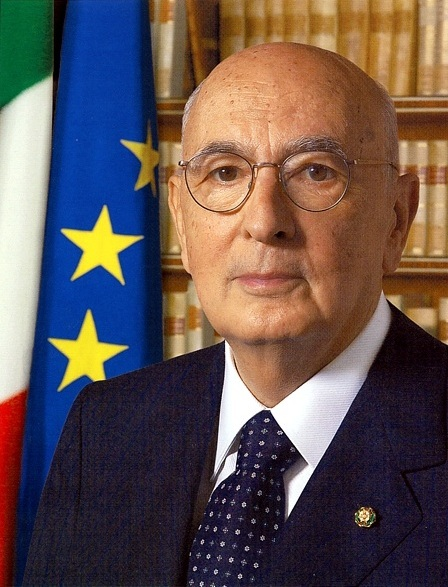
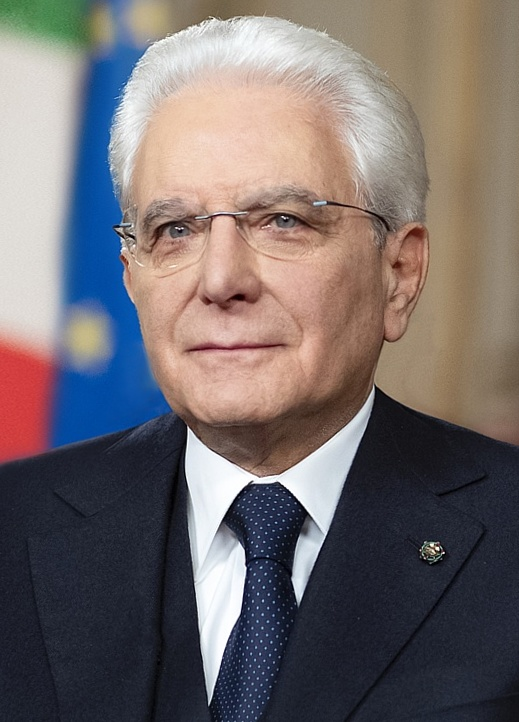
- Top left: Enrico De Nicola was the first president of the Italian Republic.
- Top right: Antonio Segni was the first president to resign from office.
- Bottom left: Giorgio Napolitano was the first president to be re-elected.
- Bottom right: Sergio Mattarella is the current president of the Italian Republic and the longest-serving president in Italian history.

The president of Italy (Italian: presidente della Repubblica) is the head of state of the Italian Republic. Since 1948, there have been 12 presidents of Italy. The official residence of the president is the Quirinal Palace in Rome. Among the Italian presidents, three came from Campania (all from Naples), three from Piedmont, two each from Sardinia (both from Sassari) and from Tuscany, one from Liguria, and one from Sicily. No woman has ever held the office.

== Election ==
The president of the Republic is elected by Parliament in a joint session of the Chamber of Deputies and the Senate of the Republic. In addition, the 20 regions of Italy appoint 58 representatives as special electors. Three representatives come from each region, except for the small Aosta Valley, which appoints one, so as to guarantee representation for all localities and minorities.

According to the Constitution of Italy, the election must be held in the form of secret ballot, with all senators, all deputies, and the 58 regional representatives all voting. A two-thirds vote is required to elect on any of the first three rounds of balloting and after that a majority suffices. The election is presided over by the president of the Chamber of Deputies, who calls for the public counting of the votes. The vote is held in the Montecitorio Palace, home of the Chamber of Deputies, which is expanded and re-configured for the event.

The president assumes office after having taken an oath before the Italian Parliament and delivering a presidential address. Presidents are elected to serve a seven-year term. Giorgio Napolitano was the first president to be elected to a second term in 2013, followed by Sergio Mattarella in 2022.

== Presidents of the Italian Republic (1948–present) ==
PLI DC PSDI PSI DS Independent
Portrait	Name (Birth–Death)	Term of office		Party	Election	Ref.
Portrait	Name (Birth–Death)	Took office	Left office	Party	Election	Ref.
	Enrico De Nicola (1877–1959)	1 January 1948 (Note: De Nicola was already provisional head of state since 1 July 1946.)	12 May 1948	Italian Liberal Party	1947	
	Enrico De Nicola (1877–1959)	132 days		Italian Liberal Party	1947	
	Luigi Einaudi (1874–1961)	12 May 1948	11 May 1955	Italian Liberal Party	1948	
	Luigi Einaudi (1874–1961)	6 years, 364 days		Italian Liberal Party	1948	
	Giovanni Gronchi (1887–1978)	11 May 1955	11 May 1962	Christian Democracy	1955	
	Giovanni Gronchi (1887–1978)	7 years, 0 days		Christian Democracy	1955	
	Antonio Segni (1891–1972)	11 May 1962	6 December 1964 (Note: After suffering a serious cerebral hemorrhage, Segni resigned for health reasons, becoming the first president to do so.)	Christian Democracy	1962	
	Antonio Segni (1891–1972)	2 years, 209 days		Christian Democracy	1962	
	Giuseppe Saragat (1898–1988)	29 December 1964	29 December 1971	Italian Democratic Socialist Party	1964	
	Giuseppe Saragat (1898–1988)	7 years, 0 days		Italian Democratic Socialist Party	1964	
	Giovanni Leone (1908–2001)	29 December 1971	15 June 1978 (Note: After being involved in the Lockheed bribery scandals, Leone resigned. He was subsequently cleared.)	Christian Democracy	1971	
	Giovanni Leone (1908–2001)	6 years, 168 days		Christian Democracy	1971	
	Sandro Pertini (1896–1990)	9 July 1978	29 June 1985 (Note: Resigned in order to bring forward the inauguration ceremony of the President-elect)	Italian Socialist Party	1978	
	Sandro Pertini (1896–1990)	6 years, 355 days		Italian Socialist Party	1978	
	Francesco Cossiga (1928–2010)	3 July 1985	28 April 1992 (Note: Cossiga resigned in order to favour the resolution of the political crisis (as a result of Mani pulite) after the 1992 Italian general election.)	Christian Democracy	1985	
	Francesco Cossiga (1928–2010)	6 years, 300 days		Christian Democracy	1985	
	Oscar Luigi Scalfaro (1918–2012)	28 May 1992	15 May 1999	Christian Democracy (Note: Scalfaro left Christian Democracy (DC) in 1992, when he was elected president. In 1994, the DC was disbanded and Scalfaro would never join another political party.)	1992	
	Oscar Luigi Scalfaro (1918–2012)	6 years, 352 days		Christian Democracy	1992	
	Carlo Azeglio Ciampi (1920–2016)	18 May 1999	15 May 2006	Independent (Note: Ciampi was a member of the Action Party (PdA), which was dissolved in 1947.)	1999	
	Carlo Azeglio Ciampi (1920–2016)	6 years, 362 days		Independent	1999	
	Giorgio Napolitano (1925–2023)	15 May 2006	14 January 2015 (Note: At 89 years old, Napolitano resigned due to age reasons.)	Democrats of the Left Independent (Note: Napolitano was a member of the Italian Communist Party (PCI), the Democratic Party of the Left (PDS), and the Democrats of the Left (DS) until his election as President in 2006.)	2006 2013	
	Giorgio Napolitano (1925–2023)	8 years, 244 days		Democrats of the Left Independent	2006 2013	
	Sergio Mattarella (born 1941)	3 February 2015	Incumbent	Independent (Note: Mattarella was a member of the DC, the Italian People's Party (PPI), The Daisy (DL), and the Democratic Party (PD) but quit political commitment when he left Parliament in 2008.)	2015 2022	
	Sergio Mattarella (born 1941)	11 years, 266 days		Independent	2015 2022	

== Substitute of the head of state ==
The Acting President of the Republic (Italian: presidente supplente della Repubblica) is an office not explicitly provided for in the Constitution but deriving from the provision contained in the article 86. On various occasions, officials had to intercede in the absence of a head of state (notably in the case of a president's resignation or ill health). Only Enrico De Nicola, who was elected to be provisional head of state by the Constituent Assembly of Italy on 28 June 1946, had an official title and took residence in the Quirinal Palace. The others took the powers but not the title of head of state. After the adoption of the Constitution in 1948, the president of the Senate of the Republic is eligible to take the powers of head of state in case of absence of the president of the Republic.

DC PLI PRI PPI PD Independent
Portrait	Name (Birth–Death)	Term of office		Party	Election	Ref.
Portrait	Name (Birth–Death)	Took office	Left office	Party	Election	Ref.
	Alcide De Gasperi (1881–1954)	13 June 1946	1 July 1946	Christian Democracy	—	(Note: De Gasperi exercised the powers of provisional head of state as Prime Minister between the departure of King Umberto II on 13 June 1946 and the proclamation of De Nicola as head of state by the Constituent Assembly on 1 July 1946.)
	Alcide De Gasperi (1881–1954)	18 days		Christian Democracy	—	(Note: De Gasperi exercised the powers of provisional head of state as Prime Minister between the departure of King Umberto II on 13 June 1946 and the proclamation of De Nicola as head of state by the Constituent Assembly on 1 July 1946.)
	Enrico De Nicola (1877–1959)	1 July 1946	31 December 1947	Italian Liberal Party	1946 1947	(Note: De Nicola was the only provisional president who had the title and not only the powers of provisional head of state. He assumed the office on 1 July 1946 and officially became President of the Republic on 1 January 1948 as ordered by the new Constitution.)
	Enrico De Nicola (1877–1959)	1 year, 183 days		Italian Liberal Party	1946 1947	(Note: De Nicola was the only provisional president who had the title and not only the powers of provisional head of state. He assumed the office on 1 July 1946 and officially became President of the Republic on 1 January 1948 as ordered by the new Constitution.)
	Cesare Merzagora (1898–1991)	6 December 1964	29 December 1964	Independent	—	(Note: As President of the Senate, Merzagora assumed temporary powers for President Segni after his cerebral hemorrhage of 10 August 1964 and assumed full powers after his resignation of 6 December and until 29 December 1964.)
	Cesare Merzagora (1898–1991)	23 days		Independent	—	(Note: As President of the Senate, Merzagora assumed temporary powers for President Segni after his cerebral hemorrhage of 10 August 1964 and assumed full powers after his resignation of 6 December and until 29 December 1964.)
	Amintore Fanfani (1908–1999)	15 June 1978	9 July 1978	Christian Democracy	—	(Note: As President of the Senate, assumed powers from President Leone after his resignation for a bribery scandal on 15 June 1978. He exercised the powers until 9 July 1978.)
	Amintore Fanfani (1908–1999)	24 days		Christian Democracy	—	(Note: As President of the Senate, assumed powers from President Leone after his resignation for a bribery scandal on 15 June 1978. He exercised the powers until 9 July 1978.)
	Francesco Cossiga (1928–2010)	29 June 1985	3 July 1985	Christian Democracy	—	(Note: As President of the Senate, Cossiga assumed powers from President Pertini on 29 June 1985, four days before taking office as President-elect.)
	Francesco Cossiga (1928–2010)	4 days		Christian Democracy	—	(Note: As President of the Senate, Cossiga assumed powers from President Pertini on 29 June 1985, four days before taking office as President-elect.)
	Giovanni Spadolini (1925–1994)	28 April 1992	28 May 1992	Italian Republican Party	—	(Note: As President of the Senate, Spadolini assumed powers from President Cossiga on 28 April 1992. He exercised the powers until 28 May 1992.)
	Giovanni Spadolini (1925–1994)	30 days		Italian Republican Party	—	(Note: As President of the Senate, Spadolini assumed powers from President Cossiga on 28 April 1992. He exercised the powers until 28 May 1992.)
	Nicola Mancino (born 1931)	15 May 1999	18 May 1999	Italian People's Party	—	(Note: As President of the Senate, Mancino assumed powers from President Scalfaro on 15 May 1999. He exercised the powers until 18 May 1999.)
	Nicola Mancino (born 1931)	3 days		Italian People's Party	—	(Note: As President of the Senate, Mancino assumed powers from President Scalfaro on 15 May 1999. He exercised the powers until 18 May 1999.)
	Pietro Grasso (born 1945)	14 January 2015	3 February 2015	Democratic Party	—	(Note: As President of the Senate, Grasso assumed powers from President Napolitano on 14 January 2015. He exercised the powers until 3 February 2015.)
	Pietro Grasso (born 1945)	20 days		Democratic Party	—	(Note: As President of the Senate, Grasso assumed powers from President Napolitano on 14 January 2015. He exercised the powers until 3 February 2015.)

== See also ==
- Italian presidential elections
- Lists of office-holders
- King of Italy, for previous Italian heads of state between 1861 and 1946
- Prime Minister of Italy
  - List of prime ministers of Italy
- Politics of Italy
