= Italian presidential elections =

Head of state elections

Italian presidential elections are held to elect the President of Italy.

== Elections ==
=== Provisional head of state ===
- 1946 Italian presidential election
- 1947 Italian presidential election

=== President of the Republic ===
- 1948 Italian presidential election
- 1955 Italian presidential election
- 1962 Italian presidential election
- 1964 Italian presidential election
- 1971 Italian presidential election
- 1978 Italian presidential election
- 1985 Italian presidential election
- 1992 Italian presidential election
- 1999 Italian presidential election
- 2006 Italian presidential election
- 2013 Italian presidential election
- 2015 Italian presidential election
- 2022 Italian presidential election
