= Ottavia Penna Buscemi =

Italian politician (1907–1986)

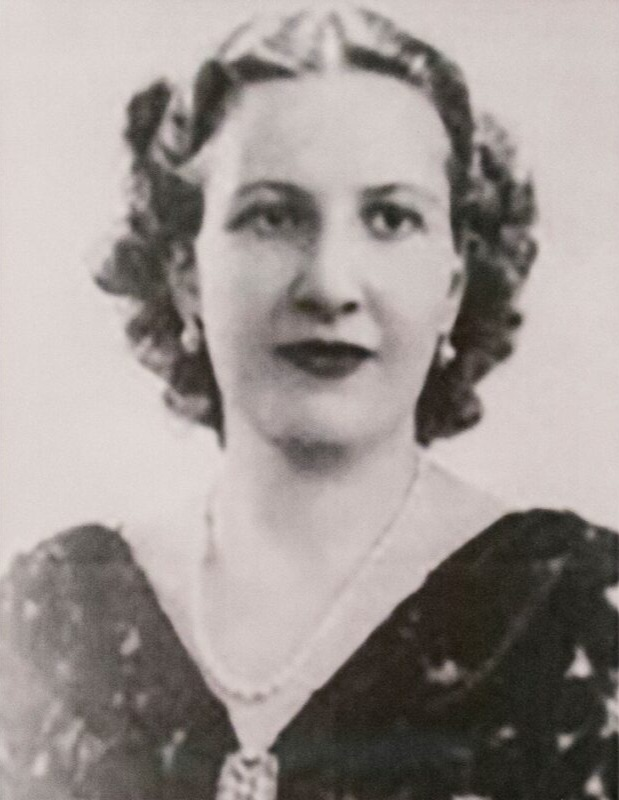

Member of the Constituent Assembly
- In office 1946–1948
- Constituency: Catania

Personal details
- Born: Ottavia Penna; 12 April 1907 Caltagirone, Sicily, Kingdom of Italy
- Died: 2 December 1986 (aged 79) Caltagirone, Sicily, Italy
- Party: Common Man's Front; National Union; Monarchist National Party
- Spouse: Filippo Buscemi Galasso (m. 1933)
- Occupation: Politician

Ottavia Penna Buscemi (née Penna; 12 April 1907 – 2 December 1986) was an Italian politician. She was elected to the Constituent Assembly in 1946 as one of the first group of women parliamentarians in Italy. Soon afterwards, she was the first woman to be nominated as a candidate to what would become the presidency.

== Biography ==
Penna Buscemi was born in Caltagirone in 1907, the daughter of the noble couple Francesco Penna (Baron of Portosalvo) and Ines Crescimanno Maggiore (Duchess of Albafiorita). After growing up in Caltagirone, she attended college in Poggio Imperiale and the Trinità dei Monti in Rome. She returned to her hometown and married Filippo Buscemi Galasso, a doctor.

Following the war, Penna Buscemi was a Common Man's Front candidate in the general elections on 2 June 1946, in which she was one of 21 women elected to the Constituent Assembly. On 28 June she was her party's nominee in the election for a head of state, the first woman to be a candidate for what would become the presidency; she finished third in the voting behind Enrico De Nicola and Cipriano Facchinetti. In November 1947 she left her party to join the National Union. She did not run for re-election in the 1948 elections, but was elected as a municipal councillor in Caltagirone in the 1953 local elections as a member of the Monarchist National Party. She died in the city in 1986.
