= Monarchy of Italy =

System of government in Italy from 1861 to 1946

- Monarchia d'Italia

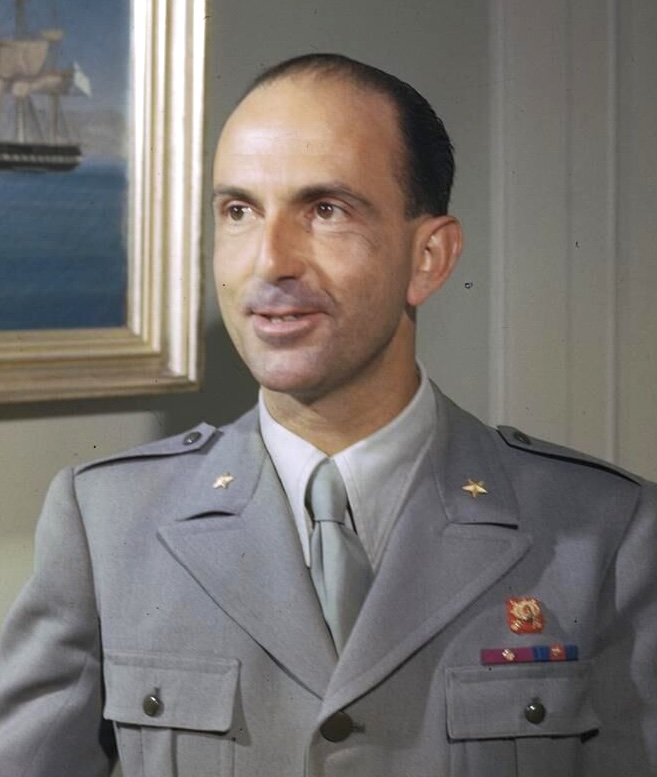
- Umberto II

Details
- Style: His Majesty
- First monarch: Victor Emmanuel II
- Last monarch: Umberto II
- Formed: 17 March 1861
- Abolished: 12 June 1946
- Residences: Royal Palace, Turin; Royal Palace, Milan; Quirinal Palace, Rome
- Appointer: Hereditary
- Pretenders: Disputed: Emanuele Filiberto, Prince of Venice; Prince Aimone, Duke of Aosta

The monarchy of Italy (Italian: Monarchia d'Italia) was the system of government in which a hereditary constitutional monarch was the sovereign of the Kingdom of Italy from 1861 to 1946.

== History ==
After the deposition of the last Western Emperor in 476, Heruli leader Odoacer was appointed Dux Italiae ("Duke of Italy") by the reigning Byzantine Emperor Zeno. Later, the Germanic foederati, the Scirians and the Heruli, as well as a large segment of the Italic Roman army, proclaimed Odoacer Rex Italiae ("King of Italy"). In 493, the Ostrogothic king Theoderic the Great killed Odoacer, and set up a new dynasty of kings of Italy. Ostrogothic rule ended when Italy was reconquered by the Byzantine Empire in 552.

In 568, the Lombards entered the peninsula and ventured to recreate a barbarian kingdom in opposition to the Empire, establishing their authority over much of Italy, except the Exarchate of Ravenna and the duchies of Rome, Venetia, Naples and the southernmost portions. In the 8th century, estrangement between the Italians and the Byzantines allowed the Lombards to capture the remaining Roman enclaves in northern Italy. However, in 774, they were defeated by the Franks under Charlemagne, who deposed their king and took up the title "king of the Lombards". After the death of Charles III the Fat in 887, Italy fell into instability and a number of kings attempted to establish themselves as independent Italian monarchs. During this period, known as the Feudal Anarchy (888–962), the title Rex Italicorum ("King of the Italians" or "King of the Italics") was introduced. After the breakup of the Frankish empire, Otto I added Italy to the Holy Roman Empire and continued the use of the title Rex Italicorum. The last to use this title was Henry II (1004–1024). Subsequent emperors used the title "king of Italy" until Charles V. At first they were crowned in Pavia, later Milan, and Charles was crowned in Bologna.

In 1805, Napoleon I was crowned with the Iron Crown of Lombardy at the Milan Cathedral. The next year, Holy Roman Emperor Francis II abdicated his imperial title. From the deposition of Napoleon I (1814) until the unification of Italy (1861), there was no Italian monarch claiming the overarching title. The Risorgimento successfully established a dynasty, the House of Savoy, over the whole peninsula, uniting the kingdoms of Sardinia and the Two Sicilies to form the modern Kingdom of Italy. The monarchy was superseded by the Italian Republic, after an institutional referendum was held on 2 June 1946 following World War II. The Italian monarchy formally ended on 12 June of that year, and Umberto II left the country.

== Full title ==
Up until the dissolution of the monarchy in 1946, the full title of the Kings of Italy (1861–1946) was:

[Name], by the Grace of God and the will of the Nation, King of Italy, King of Sardinia, Cyprus, Jerusalem, Armenia, Duke of Savoy, count of Maurienne, Marquis (of the Holy Roman Empire) in Italy; Prince of Piedmont, Carignano, Oneglia, Poirino, Trino; Prince and Perpetual Vicar of the Holy Roman Empire; Prince of Carmagnola, Montmellian with Arbin and Francin, Prince bailiff of the Duchy of Aosta, Prince of Chieri, Dronero, Crescentino, Riva di Chieri and Banna, Busca, Bene, Bra, Duke of Genoa, Monferrat, Aosta, Duke of Chablais, Genevois, Duke of Piacenza, Marquis of Saluzzo (Saluces), Ivrea, Susa, of Maro, Oristano, Cesana, Savona, Tarantasia, Borgomanero and Cureggio, Caselle, Rivoli, Pianezza, Govone, Salussola, Racconigi over Tegerone, Migliabruna and Motturone, Cavallermaggiore, Marene, Modane and Lanslebourg, Livorno Ferraris, Santhià, Agliè, Centallo and Demonte, Desana, Ghemme, Vigone, Count of Barge, Villafranca, Ginevra, Nizza, Tenda, Romont, Asti, Alessandria, of Goceano, Novara, Tortona, Bobbio, Soissons, Sant'Antioco, Pollenzo, Roccabruna, Tricerro, Bairo, Ozegna, delle Apertole, Baron of Vaud and of Faucigni, Lord of Vercelli, Pinerolo, of Lomellina, of Valle Sesia, of the Marquisate of Ceva, Overlord of Monaco, Roccabruna and eleven-twelfths of Menton, Noble Patrician of Venice, Patrician of Ferrara.

== See also ==
- List of Italian monarchs
- List of heads of state of Italy
- List of heirs to the Italian throne
