= Armando Fresa =

Italian politician (1893–1957)

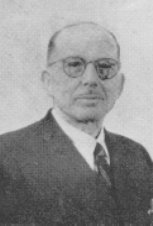
Armando Fresa

Armando Fresa (14 April 1893, Palmi - 23 October 1957) was an Italian politician and Civil Engineer Officer.

He was elected Deputy with the Common Man's Front to the Constituent Assembly in 1946. He served as Secretary of the Common Man's Front until 24 June 1946, when he was replaced by Vincenzo Tieri. In November 1947 he left the party with Emilio Patrissi to join the National Union. He remained a Deputy until 1948.
