= List of heirs to the Italian throne =

Standard and Arms of the Prince of Piedmont

The list includes all individuals who were first in line to the throne of Italy, either as heir apparent or as heir presumptive, since 1861. Those who actually succeeded to the throne are shown in bold.

== Heirs to the throne ==
Heirs to the Italian throne
Monarch	Heir	Relationship to monarch	Became heir (Date; Reason)	Ceased to be heir (Date; Reason)	Next in line of succession
Vittorio Emanuele II	**Prince Umberto, Prince of Piedmont**	Son	17 March 1861; Father proclaimed king of Italy	9 January 1878; Father died, became king	Prince Amedeo, Duke of Aosta, 1861–1869, brother
Vittorio Emanuele II	**Prince Umberto, Prince of Piedmont**	Son	17 March 1861; Father proclaimed king of Italy	9 January 1878; Father died, became king	**Prince Vittorio Emanuele, Prince of Naples**, 1869–1878, son
Umberto I	**Prince Vittorio Emanuele, Prince of Naples**	Son	9 January 1878; Father became king	29 July 1900; Father assassinated, became king	Prince Amedeo, Duke of Aosta, 1878–1890, uncle
Umberto I	**Prince Vittorio Emanuele, Prince of Naples**	Son	9 January 1878; Father became king	29 July 1900; Father assassinated, became king	Prince Emanuele Filiberto, Duke of Aosta, 1890–1900, first cousin
Vittorio Emanuele III	Prince Emanuele Filiberto, Duke of Aosta	First cousin	29 July 1900; First cousin became king	15 September 1904; Son born to king	Prince Amedeo, Duke of Apulia, son
Vittorio Emanuele III	**Prince Umberto, Prince of Piedmont**	Son	15 September 1904; Born	9 May 1946; Father abdicated, became king	Prince Emanuele Filiberto, Duke of Aosta, 1904–1931, first cousin once-removed
Vittorio Emanuele III	**Prince Umberto, Prince of Piedmont**	Son	15 September 1904; Born	9 May 1946; Father abdicated, became king	Prince Amedeo, Duke of Aosta, 1931–1937, second cousin
Vittorio Emanuele III	**Prince Umberto, Prince of Piedmont**	Son	15 September 1904; Born	9 May 1946; Father abdicated, became king	Prince Vittorio Emanuele, Prince of Naples, 1937–1946, son
Umberto II	Prince Vittorio Emanuele, Prince of Naples	Son	9 May 1946; Father became king	12 June 1946; Monarchy abolished by referendum	Prince Aimone, Duke of Aosta, second cousin once-removed
