= 1999 Italian presidential election =

Election of the President of the Italian Republic

← 1992	13 May 1999	2006 →

1,010 voters (322 Senators, 630 Deputies and 58 regional representatives) 674 (1st–3rd ballots) or 506 (4th ballot onwards) votes needed to win
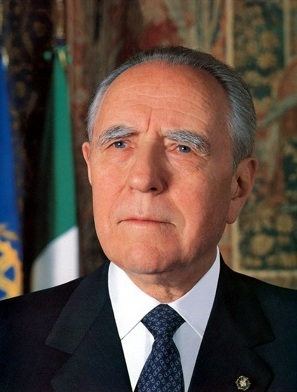

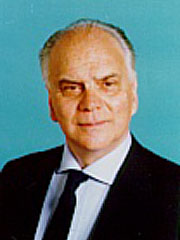
Nominee	Carlo Azeglio Ciampi	Luciano Gasperini
Party	Independent	Lega Nord
Electoral vote	707	72
Percentage	70.0%	7.12%
President before election
Oscar Luigi Scalfaro
DC
Elected President
Carlo Azeglio Ciampi
Independent

The 1999 Italian presidential election was held on 13 May 1999. As a second-level, indirect election, only Members of Parliament and regional deputies were entitled to vote. Carlo Azeglio Ciampi was elected head of state of the Italian Republic, a role of representation of national unity and guarantee that Italian politics comply with the Constitution, in the framework of a parliamentary system.

On 13 May, the former Prime Minister Carlo Azeglio Ciampi was elected on the first ballot with 707 votes. His term officially started with a swearing-in ceremony held on 18 May.

== Procedure ==
According with the Italian Constitution, the election must be held in the form of secret ballot, with the Senators, the Deputies and 58 regional representatives allowed to cast their votes. When the 1999 election was held, the Senate counted 322 members and the Chamber of Deputies counted 630 members; the electors were in total 1010. The election is held in the Palazzo Montecitorio, home of the Chamber of Deputies, with the capacity of the building being expanded for the purpose. The first three ballots require a two-thirds majority of the voters in order to elect a president. The election is conducted by the President of the Chamber of Deputies, who has the authority to proceed to the public counting of the votes. The presidential mandate lasts seven years.

On 13 May 1999, the President of the Chamber of Deputies Luciano Violante, in agreement with the President of the Senate Nicola Mancino, convened the two houses of the Italian Parliament, integrated with a number of representatives appointed by the twenty Italian regions, in a common session in order to commence voting for the election of the new President of the Italian Republic.

== Proposed candidates ==
Candidate		Region of birth	Office(s) held	Supporting party or coalition
Carlo Azeglio Ciampi	Carlo Azeglio Ciampi (78); Independent	Tuscany	Prime Minister of Italy (1993–1994) Other offices: Minister of the Treasury, Budget and Economic Programming from 1996 to 1999; Governor of the Bank of Italy from 1979 to 1993; Director General of the Bank of Italy from 1978 to 1979	Democrats of the Left; Forza Italia
Umberto Bossi	Luciano Gasperini (63); Lega Nord	Veneto	Leader of the Lega Nord in the Senate (1998–1999) Other offices: Member of the Senate from 1996 to 2001	Lega Nord
Pietro Ingrao	Pietro Ingrao (84); Communist Refoundation Party	Lazio	President of the Chamber of Deputies (1976–1979) Other offices: Vice President of the Chamber of Deputies from 1972 to 1976; Member of the Chamber of Deputies from 1950 to 1992	Communist Refoundation Party

== Ballots ==
=== First ballot (13 May) ===
Prime Minister Massimo D'Alema initially proposed Carlo Azeglio Ciampi as government's official candidate, in an attempt to reach an agreement with the House of Freedoms, whose votes would have been necessary to have a successful election at the first ballot. The centre-right opposition then declared its intent to vote for Ciampi.

The voting resulted in the election of Carlo Azeglio Ciampi as President of the Italian Republic.

==== Results ====
Candidate	Votes
Carlo Azeglio Ciampi	707
Luciano Gasperini	72
Pietro Ingrao	21
Rosa Russo Iervolino	16
Emma Bonino	15
Giulio Andreotti	10
Bettino Craxi	6
Nicola Mancino	6
Luciano Violante	6
Oscar Luigi Scalfaro	5
Silvio Berlusconi	4
Antonio Fazio	5
Mino Martinazzoli	4
Giuliano Amato	3
Francesco Cossiga	3
Augusto Barbera	2
Antonio Baldassarre	2
Others	25
Blank votes	55
Invalid votes	18
