= 1948 Italian presidential election =

← 1947	10–11 May 1948	1955 →

900 voters (287 Senators, 613 Deputies) 600 (1st–3rd ballots) or 451 (4th ballot onwards) votes needed to win
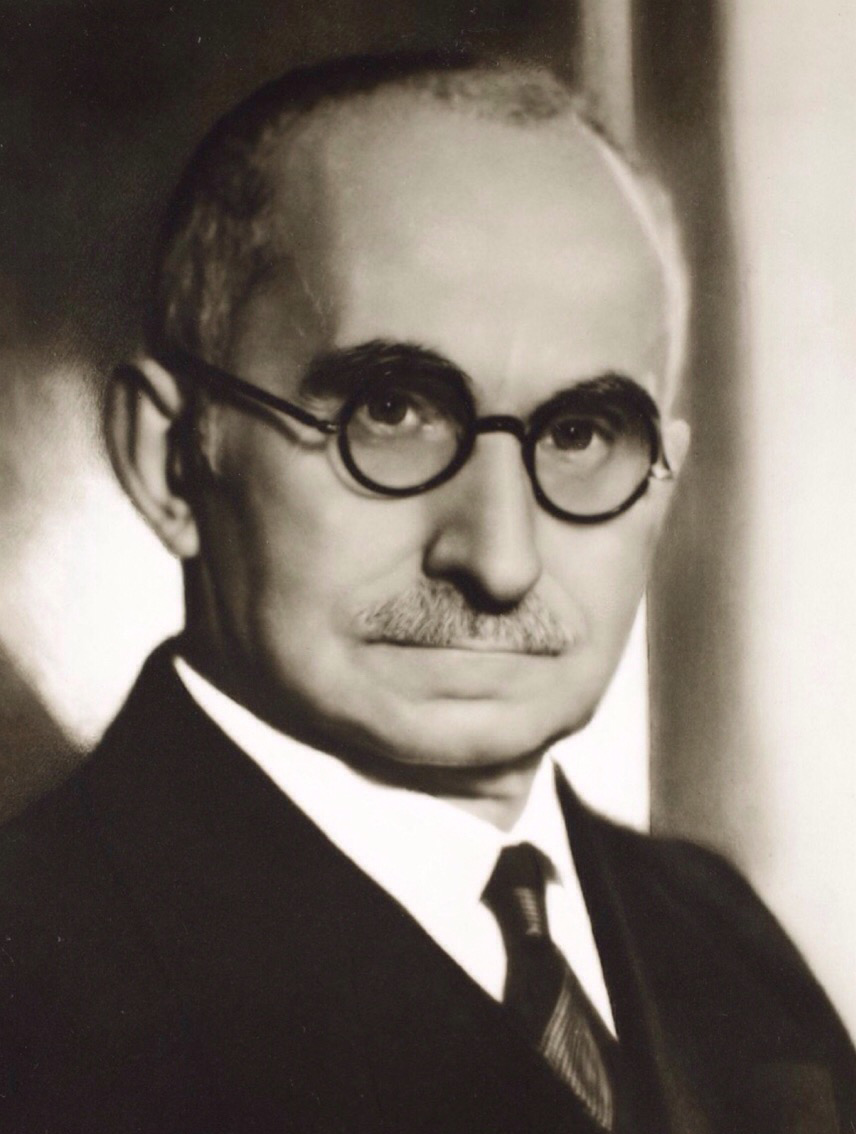

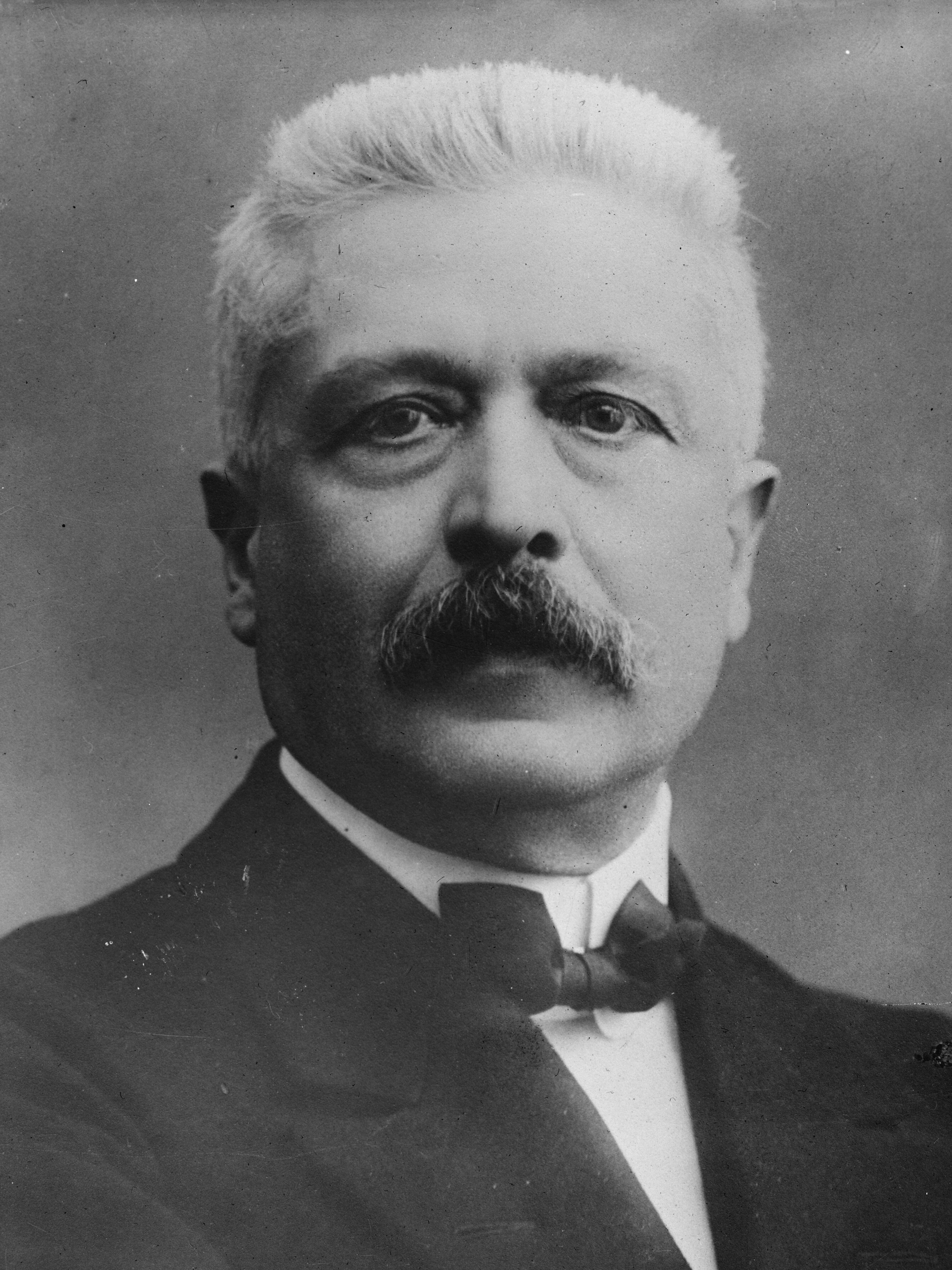
Nominee	Luigi Einaudi	Vittorio Emanuele Orlando
Party	PLI	PLI
Electoral vote	518	320
Percentage	57.5%	35.5%
- Result on the fourth ballot (11 May 1948) Einaudi 518 Orlando 320 Others 4 Invalids, blanks, abstentions and absents 58
President before election
Enrico De Nicola
PLI
Elected President
Luigi Einaudi
PLI

The 1948 Italian presidential election was held in Italy on 10–11 May 1948. Luigi Einaudi, governor of the Bank of Italy and member of the Liberal Party, was elected as the new President of Italy.

Only members of newly elected Parliament were entitled to vote. The 1948 presidential election was the first one voted by a regular Parliament.

== Procedure ==
In accordance with the new Italian Constitution, the election was held in the form of a secret ballot, with the Senators and the Deputies entitled to vote. The election was held at Montecitorio, home of the Chamber of Deputies, with the capacity of the building expanded for the purpose. The first three ballots required a two-thirds majority of the 900 voters in order to elect a president, or 600 votes. Starting from the fourth ballot, an absolute majority was required for candidates to be elected, or 451 votes.

The election was presided over by the President of the Chamber of Deputies Giovanni Gronchi, who proceeded to the public counting of the votes, and by the President of the Senate Ivanoe Bonomi.

== Timeline ==
On 8 May 1948, the new Parliament elected on the April election officially sworn in. According to the protocol, the incumbent President Enrico De Nicola resigned in order to allow the first elected Parliament of the Republic to elect a new president.

De Nicola could actually have run for a second term, but his opposition to the centrist politics of the Christian democrat Prime Minister Alcide De Gasperi and to the 1947 Treaty of Peace, made him to lose the support of the Christian Democracy party. His candidacy was supported just by the leftist parties, which on the first ballot were able to show De Gapseri how was their strength in the Assembly by voting unanimously for De Nicola and making him the most voted candidate on ballot.

De Gasperi was intentioned to support the candidacy to the presidency of the incumbent Minister of Foreign Affairs, the republican Carlo Sforza. Strongly opposed by the leftist parties for his anticommunism - the Secretary of the Italian Communist Party Palmiro Togliatti once defined him a "servile American marine" - Sforza wasn't able to gain to support of some members of the Christian Democracy group, especially those who were part of the leftist faction of the party led by Giuseppe Dossetti, in that period positioned on more neutralist stances.

On 11 May, after the second ballot in which was clear that Sforza failed to obtain the support of more than 40 Christian democrat representatives (the so-called franchi tiratori, or snipers), De Gasperi decided to withdraw his support to Sforza's candidacy and decided to endorse the governor of Bank of Italy Luigi Einaudi. As a well-known anti-fascist liberal economist with a socialist past and a strong pro-Atlantic faith, Einaudi was well seen by a large number of representatives, including some liberals and social democrats. His candidacy was instead strongly opposed by the monarchists, although Einaudi had endorsed the monarchy during the 1946 institutional referendum campaign.

On the fourth ballot, Einaudi was elected president by a large margin, while the communists and the socialists decided to vote for the liberal senator Vittorio Emanuele Orlando.

As a sign of protest the monarchists representatives did not participate in the vote. During the first ballot, the nobleman and monarchist deputy Giovanni Alliata di Montereale (1921–1994) decided to tear up his ballot paper in front of the President of the Chamber of Deputies as a sign of offense towards the new republican institutions.

== Proposed candidates ==
Candidate		Office(s) held	Supporting party	Round(s)
Carlo Sforza	Carlo Sforza (76); PRI	Minister of Foreign Affairs (1947–1951) Other offices: President of the Chamber of Deputies from 1945 to 1946	DC; PRI; PLI; PSLI	1st 2nd
Enrico De Nicola	Enrico De Nicola (70); PLI	President of Italy (1948) Other offices: Head of State of the Provisional Government of Italy from 1946 to 1948; President of the Chamber of Deputies from 1920 to 1924	PCI; PSI	1st 2nd
Luigi Einaudi	Luigi Einaudi (74); PLI	Governor of the Bank of Italy (1945–1948) Other offices: Minister of the Budget from 1947 to 1948; Deputy Prime minister of Italy from 1947 to 1948	DC; PRI; PLI; PSLI	3rd 4th
Vittorio Emanuele Orlando	Vittorio Emanuele; Orlando (87); PLI	Prime Minister of Italy (1917–1919) Other offices: President of the Chamber of Deputies from 1919 to 1920; from 1944 to 1946; Minister of the Interior from 1916 to 1919	PCI; PSI	4th

== Results ==
Candidate	Round			
Candidate	1st	2nd	3rd	4th
Enrico De Nicola	396	336	13	–
Carlo Sforza	353	405	9	–
Luigi Einaudi	20	16	462	518
Ivanoe Bonomi	10	1	4	–
Cipriano Facchinetti	10	3	3	–
Alessandro Casati	5	5	5	–
Gaetano Pieraccini	–	49	–	–
Vittorio Emanuele Orlando	–	–	7	320
Other candidates	2	–	6	4
Blank papers	56	40	333	29
Invalid papers	1	3	8	–
Abstentions	15	9	15	1
Presents	868	867	863	872
Absents	32	33	37	28
Total	900	900	900	900
Elected: Luigi Einaudi (PLI)
Source: Presidency of the Republic

== Inauguration ==
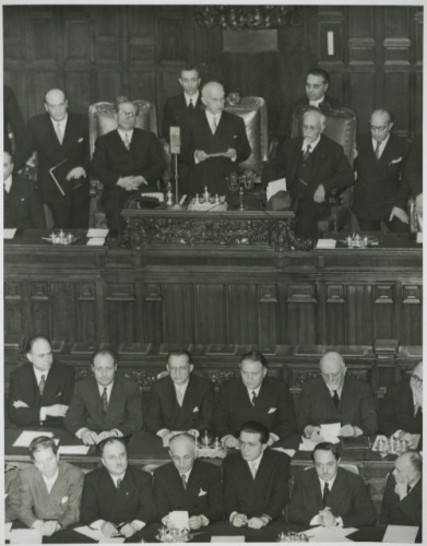
Luigi Einaudi giving his inaugural address in the Chamber of Deputies on 12 May 1948

On 12 May 1948 Luigi Einaudi officially sworn in as the new President of Italy.

As required by the procedure, after taking the oath in front of the Italian Parliament, Einaudi gave his inaugural address to the nation, speaking in the President of the Chamber of Deputies. His address was fair quite short, lasting just 19 minutes.

A central theme of President Einaudi's inaugural address was a call to restore a true democratic system after more than twenty years of fascist dictatorship. He underlined the importance of two liberal principles enunciated in the new Constitution, freedom and equality: "It [the Constitution] affirms two solemn principles: to preserve in the present social structure only what is the guarantee of the freedom of the human person against the omnipotence of the State and private arrogance; and to guarantee to everyone, whatever the fortuitous cases of birth, the greatest possible equality in the starting points".

President Einaudi contained also several references to the international affiliation of the newborn Italian Republic: "Twenty years of dictatorial rule had proclaimed civil unrest, external war, and such material and moral destruction to the Fatherland that every hope of redemption seemed vain. Instead, after having saved, despite the regional and local differences and painfully mutilated, the indestructible national unity from the Alps to Sicily, we are now tenaciously reconstructing the destroyed material fortunes and we have twice given the world admirable proof of our will to return to free democratic political competitions and our ability to cooperate, equal among equals, in the forums in which we want to rebuild that Europe from which so much light of thought and humanity came into the world".

=== Gallery ===
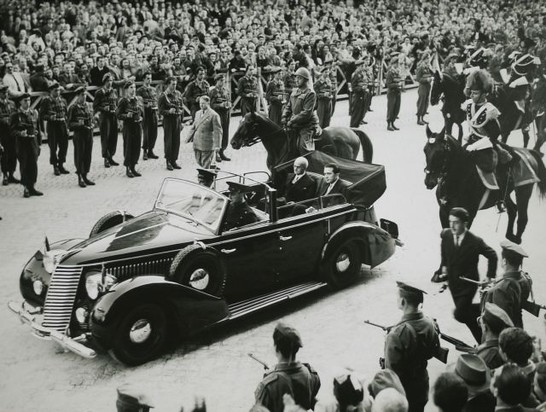
Einaudi arrives with Giulio Andreotti at Montecitorio to officially take the oath

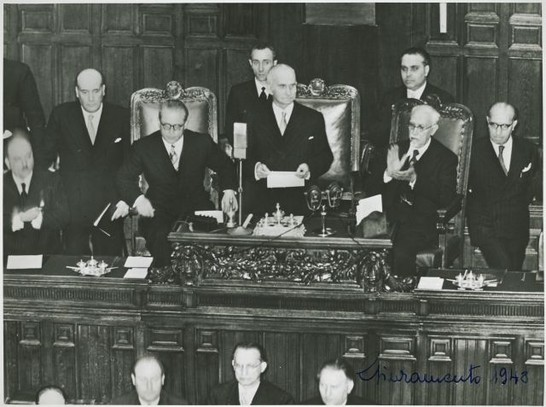
Einaudi during his inaugural address
