= 1947 Italian provisional head of state election =

1947 Italian presidential election
← 1946	26 June 1947	1948 →

556 members of the Constituent Assembly 337 votes needed to win
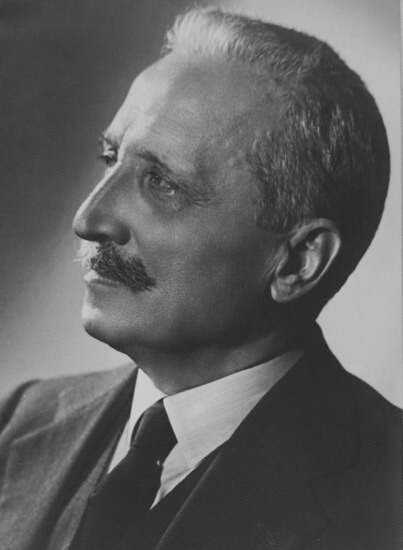
Nominee	Enrico De Nicola
Party	PLI
Electoral vote	405
Percentage	72.8%

The 1947 Italian presidential election was undertaken to elect a provisional head of the Italian State.

== Background ==
Enrico De Nicola submitted his resignation on 25 June 1947, officially for health reasons, but also to regain legitimacy after the annual term of the Constituent Assembly of Italy, to which even his term was tied, had expired.

Enrico De Nicola, however, was still re-elected as Provisional Head of State on 26 June 1947. From 1 January 1948 he assumed the title of President of the Italian Republic in accordance with the first final provision of the Constitution of Italy.

== Result ==
Candidate	1st Round
Enrico De Nicola	405
Pietro Nenni	2
Giuseppe Salvatore Bellusci	2
Cipriano Facchinetti	2
Other candidates	--
Blank papers	19
Invalid papers	1
Voting	431
Total	556
Source: Parliament of Italy
