= National Union (Italy, 1947) =

Italian parliamentary group

The National Union was a parliamentary group formed in 1947 in the Constituent Assembly of Italian Republic, spin-off of the Common Man's Front.

== Background ==
The Common Man's Front was a political movement with a very light and informal structure, completely in opposition to the great mass parties that were formed in Italy. Despite the initial successes achieved especially in Rome and in Southern Italy, the movement accused obvious problems related not only to the lack of internal cohesion, but also to the consequent difficulties in developing a coherent political agenda.

His boss, William Giannini, wanted to bring the group within the ranks of the Italian Liberal Party, but the leaders of the latter categorically refused because of his positions judged conservative, right-handed and ambiguous face to the nostalgic of the fascism. Ironically, the spark that explode the split was instead the attitude, considered too much moderate by the hardline interior, towards the De Gasperi IV Cabinet, to which Giannini had initiated a confrontation looking to some local elections. T14 MPs abandoned the Front, and on November 15, 1947 they formed their own group of National Union to oppose any compromise with the centrist government forces which were leading the country.

== The group ==
The parliamentary group, led by Emilio Patrissi, did not have a very long life, as on January 31 the Assembly finished its work. The group, having anti-politic ideas, never turned into a structured party. Some of its members, however, living in a state of economic ease into their private life, not even run again the election of 1948, while others turned in particular to the National Monarchist Party, but also someone to Italian Liberal Party and the most conservative fringes of the Christian Democratic Party.

== Members ==
- Emilio Patrissi, President
- Bartolomeo Cannizzo, vice president
- Ezio Coppa, secretary
- Pietro Castiglia
- Vincenzo Cicerone
- Tommaso Corsini
- Giuseppe De Falco
- Armando Fresa
- Mario Marina
- Gennaro Patricolo
- Ottavia Penna Buscemi
- Renato Puoti
- Guido Russo Perez
- Vincenzo Selvaggi

== Links ==
- Site of the House
