= Lidia Menapace =

Italian politician (1924–2020)

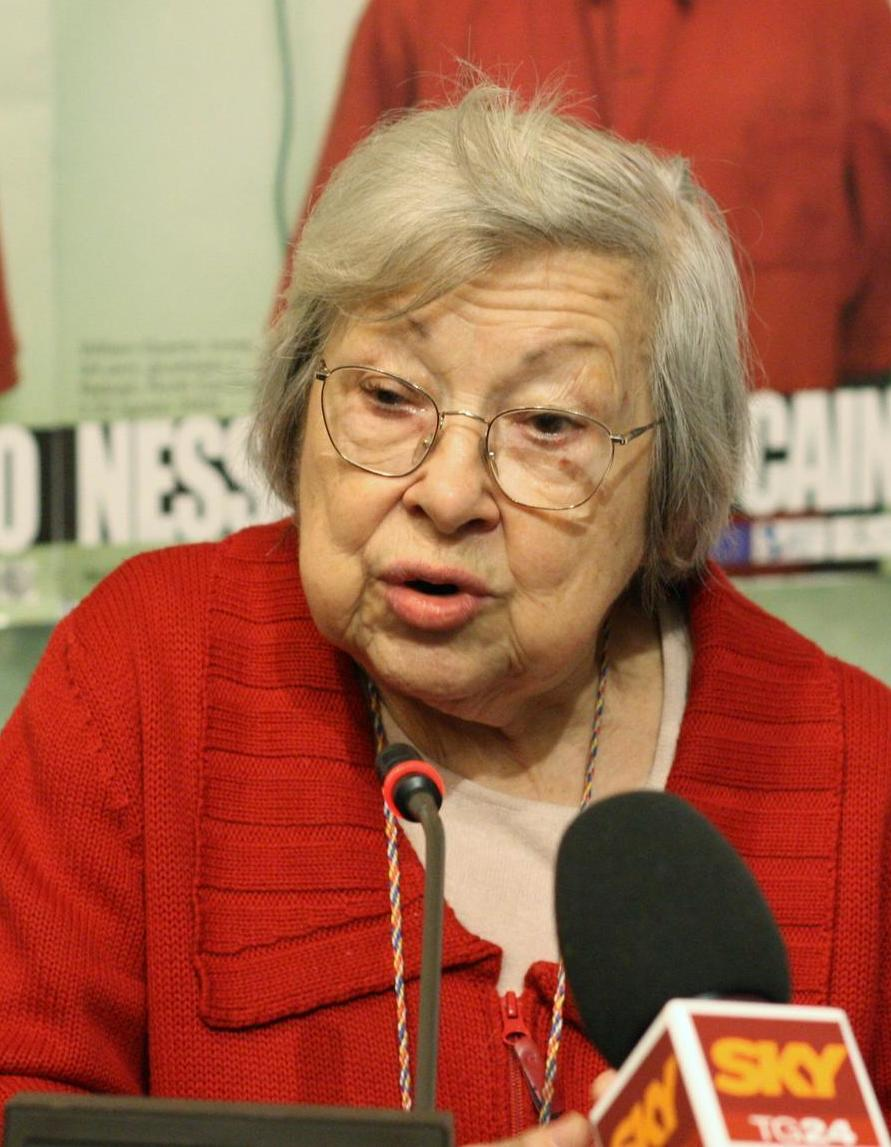

Member of the Senate of the Republic
- In office 28 April 2006 – 28 April 2008
- Constituency: Friuli-Venezia Giulia

Personal details
- Born: Lidia Brisca; 3 April 1924 Novara, Kingdom of Italy
- Died: 7 December 2020 (aged 96) Bolzano, Italy
- Cause of death: COVID-19
- Party: DC (until 1968); PCI (1968–1969); PdUP (1974–1984); PRC (2006–2020)
- Education: Università Cattolica del Sacro Cuore
- Occupation: Essayist, politician

Lidia Menapace (3 April 1924 – 7 December 2020) was an Italian Resistance fighter and politician who served as provincial minister of South Tyrol for Christian Democracy from 1964 to 1968, and then as senator from 2006 to 2008, representing the Communist Refoundation Party.

== Biography ==
Lidia Menapace (née Brisca) was born in the northern Italian city of Novara. Her father was a surveyor named Giacomo Brisca and espoused anti-fascist, republican, and Mazzinian politics. Her mother was Italia Vercesi, a homemaker whose family tended towards anarchism.

While in primary school during the dictatorship of Benito Mussolini, her teachers taught the children to honor and love the regime. Her mother told her to destroy school reports in which she was classified as belonging to the "Aryan race" because "[w]e are not animals". In 1943, her father was sent to a concentration camp because he would not obey the authority of the Republic of Salò, a recently created Nazi puppet state in northern Italy. Two years later, he was freed, and in the meantime she had joined the Resistance at age 19.

During the time she was a literature student at the Catholic University of Milan, Menapace delivered messages to anti-fascist soldiers. She also helped Jewish men to escape Italy by bringing them to the Swiss border, and she helped organize escapes from prison. She hid bombs and copies of a Resistance newspaper in the basement of her family's home. She also passed secret messages to political prisoners in jail.

After her role in the World War II resistance as a partisan, during which she rode her bicycle to deliver encoded messages to other Italian resistance fighters, Menapace became a pacifism activist and women's rights advocate. She was a member of the collective that founded il manifesto, a left-wing newspaper. She was the first woman elected to a legislature position in Bolzano.

Menapace was married to Eugenio Menapace. She died from COVID-19 on 7 December 2020, during the COVID-19 pandemic in Italy.
