= 2006 Italian presidential election =

Election of the President of the Italian Republic

- 8–10 May 2006

1,009 voters (315 Senators, 5 Senators for life, 629 Deputies and 58 regional representatives) 673 (1st–3rd ballots) or 505 (4th ballot onwards) votes needed to win
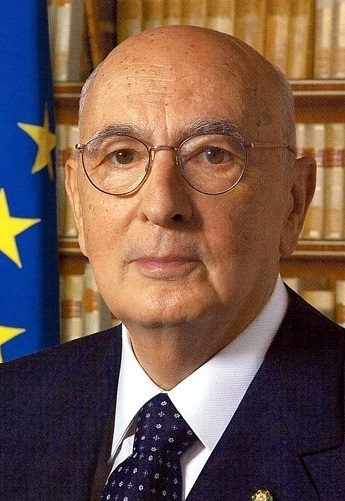

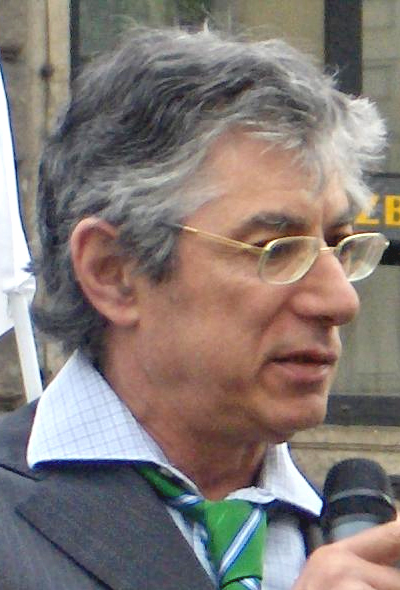
Nominee	Giorgio Napolitano	Umberto Bossi
Party	DS	Lega Nord
Alliance	The Union
Electoral vote	543	42
Percentage	53.81%	4.15%
- Result on the fourth ballot (10 May 2006) Napolitano 543 Bossi 42; Others 44 Invalids or blanks 380
President before election
Carlo Azeglio Ciampi
Independent
Elected President
Giorgio Napolitano
DS

The 2006 Italian presidential election was held on 8–10 May 2006. The result was the election of Giorgio Napolitano, the first time a former member of the Italian Communist Party had been elected to the presidency of the Italian Republic.

Only members of Parliament and regional delegates were entitled to vote, most of these electors having been elected in the 2006 general election. As head of state of the Italian Republic, the president has a role of representation of national unity and guarantees that Italian politics comply with the Italian Constitution, in the framework of a parliamentary system.

== Procedure ==
In accordance with the Italian Constitution, the election was held in the form of a secret ballot, with the Senators, the Deputies and 58 regional representatives entitled to vote. The election was held in the Palazzo Montecitorio, home of the Chamber of Deputies, with the capacity of the building expanded for the purpose. The first three ballots required a two-thirds majority of the 1,009 voters in order to elect a president, or 673 votes. Starting from the fourth ballot, an absolute majority was required for candidates to be elected, or 505 votes. The presidential mandate lasts seven years. The term of the incumbent president, Carlo Azeglio Ciampi, was due to end on 18 May 2006 (but eventually ended already on 15 May).

The election was presided over by the President of the Chamber of Deputies Fausto Bertinotti, who proceeded to the public counting of the votes, and by the President of the Senate Franco Marini.

== Proposed candidates ==
Candidate		Region of birth	Office(s) held	Supporting party or coalition
Umberto Bossi	Umberto Bossi (64); Lega Nord	Lombardy	Federal Secretary of Lega Nord (1989–2012) Other offices: Minister for Institutional Reforms and Devolution from 2001 to 2004; Member of the European Parliament from 1994 to 2001; Member of the Chamber of Deputies from 1992 to 2004; Member of the Senate from 1987 to 1992	Lega Nord
Giorgio Napolitano	Giorgio Napolitano (80); Democrats of the Left	Campania	Senator for life (2005–2006) Other offices: Minister of the Interior from 1996 to 1998; Minister for Civil Protection Coordination from 1996 to 1998; President of the Chamber of Deputies from 1992 to 1994; Member of the European Parliament from 1989 to 1992 and from 1999 to 2004; Member of the Chamber of Deputies from 1953 to 1963 and from 1968 to 1996	The Union
Franca Rame	Franca Rame (76); Italy of Values	Lombardy	Member of the Senate (2006–2008)	Italy of Values
Gianni Letta	Gianni Letta (71); Forza Italia	Tuscany	Secretary of the Council of Ministers (1994–1995; 2001–2006)	House of Freedoms

== Chronology ==
On 2 May 2006 the President of the Chamber of Deputies Fausto Bertinotti, in agreement with President of the Senate Franco Marini, convened the two houses of the Italian Parliament, integrated with a number of representatives appointed by the twenty Italian regions, in a common session on 8 May in order to commence voting for the election of the new President of the Italian Republic.

Outgoing President Carlo Azeglio Ciampi, 85, was asked to run for another mandate by the centre-right coalition House of Freedoms, with the strong support of the centre-left coalition The Union. However, Ciampi declined to run again, noting that "none of the past nine presidents of the Republic has been re-elected. I think this has become a meaningful rule. It is better not to infringe it".

On 10 May 2006 Giorgio Napolitano, the candidate endorsed by the centre-left coalition, was elected on the fourth ballot with 543 votes. His term officially started with a swearing-in ceremony held on 15 May 2006.

== Ballots ==
=== First ballot (8 May) ===
The Union initially proposed lifetime Senator Giorgio Napolitano as its official candidate, in an attempt to reach an agreement with the House of Freedoms, whose votes would have been necessary to have a successful election at the first ballot; however, the centre-right opposition declared it did not intend to vote for Napolitano, and instead announced its own members would vote for Gianni Letta. After this announcement, the Union declared that its members would cast a blank vote in the first ballot, in order not to waste Napolitano's candidacy, with the exception of the Rose in the Fist, which would vote for either Adriano Sofri or Emma Bonino. Inside the centre-right, the Christian Democracy for Autonomies and the New Italian Socialist Party voted for the journalist Giuliano Ferrara.

The voting operations started at 16:00 CEST; as no candidate obtained the 673 votes requested to win the election, a new ballot was held in the morning of May 9.

==== Results ====
Candidate	Votes
Gianni Letta	369
Massimo D'Alema	27
Franca Rame	24
Adriano Sofri	23
Siegfried Brugger	12
Giuliano Ferrara	8
Giorgio Napolitano	8
Giampaolo Malavasi	6
Gino Strada	5
Carlo Azeglio Ciampi	4
Giuliano Amato	3
Umberto Bossi	3
Cesare Previti	3
Stefano Rodotà	3
Giulio Andreotti	2
Mario Anzani	2
Silvio Berlusconi	2
Lidia Menapace	2
Others	22
Blank votes	438
Invalid votes	18

Among the other votes cast, there were one vote each for Linda Giuva, wife of Massimo D'Alema, singer/songwriter Francesco Guccini and controversial writer Oriana Fallaci. A vote for Giorgio Almirante, historical leader of the Italian Social Movement who died in 1988, was declared invalid.

=== Second ballot (9 May) ===
This ballot, as well as the first, required a majority of 673 votes. After several discussions about the opportunity to vote for Giorgio Napolitano, the House of Freedoms decided to cast a blank vote too. However, the Union of Christian and Centre Democrats declared its members could vote for Napolitano in the next ballot, an opinion that was not shared within the coalition. Due to the lack of consensus and the row in the opposition, the Union members decided to continue withholding their votes for Napolitano. Rather than casting a blank vote, the centre-left party UDEUR instead decided to vote in this ballot for an own symbolic candidate, Giuseppe De Rita.

The voting operations started at 11:30 CEST.

==== Results ====
Candidate	Votes
Umberto Bossi	38
Massimo D'Alema	35
Giuseppe De Rita	19
Giorgio Napolitano	15
Siegfried Brugger	11
Gianni Letta	11
Giuliano Ferrara	9
Renato Antonioli	7
Francesco Proietti Cosimi	6
Angelo Sanza	6
Gino Strada	5
Giuliano Amato	5
Antonio Ambra	3
Carlo Azeglio Ciampi	3
Maria Gabriella of Savoy	3
Linda Giuva	3
Franco Marini	3
Lidia Menapace	3
Luigi Pallaro	3
Stefano Rodotà	3
Bruno Vespa	3
Mauro Mellini	2
Franco Piperno	2
Others	29
Blank votes	724
Invalid votes	22

Among the other votes, there were one vote each for rock musician Vasco Rossi and Luciano Moggi, general manager of the football team Juventus FC

=== Third ballot (9 May) ===
After the second ballot, Silvio Berlusconi declared his coalition would never vote for either Giorgio Napolitano or any other candidate associated with the Democrats of the Left, and would continue casting blank votes for both the third and probably also the fourth ballot. However, Pier Ferdinando Casini, leader of the Union of Christian and Centre Democrats, an ally of Berlusconi in the House of Freedoms, declared that his party considered it "a mistake not to vote for Giorgio Napolitano as President of the Republic" and expressed a wish for a large consensus among the political forces on Napolitano's name. On the other hand, the Union declared its members would again cast a blank vote in this ballot, but would vote for Napolitano in the fourth ballot, to be held on May 10, for which a plain majority of votes would be required for a successful election.

The voting operations started at 17:00 CEST.

==== Results ====
Candidate	Votes
Massimo D'Alema	31
Giorgio Napolitano	16
Giuliano Ferrara	10
Gianni Letta	10
Gino Strada	6
Mario Cavallaro	5
Linda Giuva	4
Mino Martinazzoli	4
Marco Matteucci	4
Giuliano Amato	3
Silvio Berlusconi	3
Carlo Azeglio Ciampi	3
Biagio Di Maria	3
Roberto Formigoni	3
Aurelio Garritano	3
Lino Iannuzzi	3
Franco Piperno	3
Stefano Servadei	3
Mirko Tremaglia	3
Tullio Ancora	2
Tina Anselmi	2
Carlo Bertolotti	2
Rosy Bindi	2
Vito Gamberale	2
Lidia Menapace	2
Barbara Palombelli	2
Sergio Pininfarina	2
Others	37
Blank votes	770
Invalid votes	28

=== Fourth ballot (10 May) ===
The fourth ballot is the first one that requires only a simple majority for a successful election, that is, 505 votes; thus, the Union could elect its own candidate without needing to find agreement with the House of Freedoms.

The Union declared its members would vote for Giorgio Napolitano in this ballot. The House of Freedoms declared that its members would cast a blank vote; however, the decision was not taken unanimously, as the Union of Christian and Centre Democrats clearly showed its approval of Napolitano's candidacy. Former secretary of the party Marco Follini declared he would vote for Napolitano.

The voting operations, started at 9:30 CEST, resulted in the election of Giorgio Napolitano as President of the Italian Republic.

==== Results ====
Candidate	Votes
Giorgio Napolitano	543
Umberto Bossi	42
Massimo D'Alema	10
Giuliano Ferrara	7
Gianni Letta	6
Silvio Berlusconi	5
Roberto Dipiazza	3
Sergio Pininfarina	3
Others	10
Blank votes	347
Invalid votes	14

== Criticisms and reactions ==
There has been criticism from across the political spectrum about the presidential elections, mostly from the minority right-wing coalition. Since the speakers of both houses of parliament were chosen by the winning coalition, the House of Freedoms demanded an impartial candidate for the role of president. The Union stressed the fact that the Italian Constitution demands that the president be a defender of the constitution, hinting that such a quality was scarce among the opposition members.

Most of the criticism focused on how the president was to be elected. Surprisingly, given the enormous heat and animosity shown in the preceding general elections, the two coalition leaders organized a meeting to try to come up with a candidate that was acceptable to both. The attempts failed quickly, with the Union arguing that the House of Freedom was not interested in any candidate, and the House of Freedom arguing that the Union was not proposing any that were acceptable.

Silvio Berlusconi, the leader of the opposition, was the most vocal opponent of any candidate that came from the former Italian Communist Party, in line with the anti-communist stance he had taken in the campaign. His allies, especially the Union of Christian and Centre Democrats (UDC), openly disagreed with his intransigence but vowed to stick with their ally's decision. Yet, when Napolitano was elected, Silvio Berlusconi gave an interview to one of his political magazines Panorama saying that the UDC betrayed him by letting 60 of his electors cast a blank vote on the first ballot, instead of supporting the official candidate Gianni Letta. When the UDC argued that this might have spelled the end of the Coalition, Silvio Berlusconi quickly changed his stance by saying, as he often had, that he had been "misunderstood" and that he never gave that journalist an interview.

The candidacy of Massimo D'Alema was supported by his party, the Democrats of the Left, and by other parties of the coalition, such as the Party of Italian Communists, the Communist Refoundation Party and Democracy is Freedom – The Daisy, but opposed by others, such as the Rose in the Fist, arguing that his candidacy was driven by a particracy's mentality. Also, part of the left-wing coalition considered D'Alema far too willing to conduct backroom deals with the opposition. Some moderate journalists liked D'Alema because his presidency would have given Romano Prodi a stabler government, since the biggest party of the Union had not been rewarded with any institutional position.

In the opposition coalition, while Silvio Berlusconi vehemently opposed a D'Alema presidency, some of his aides, such as Marcello Dell'Utri, and some aligned newspapers, such as Il Foglio, campaigned for D'Alema. However, the official stance of the centre-right was that D'Alema, being an important left-wing politician and having participated in the election campaign, was ill-suited for president, a role that it is supposed to be impartial.

However, when the Union proposed Giorgio Napolitano, a senator for life that in recent years had not had a prominent role in politics, the House of Freedom objected that the Union should have presented a list of names. In the end, the House of Freedom chose to cast a blank vote. Some right-wing newspapers protested the communist background of the new president.

== Sources ==
- (in Italian) Official results (from the Italian Parliament website)
