= 1978 Italian presidential election =

Election of the President of the Italian Republic

← 1971	29 June – 8 July 1978	1985 →

1,011 voters (323 Senators, 630 Deputies and 58 regional representatives) 675 (1st–3rd ballots) or 506 (4th ballot onwards) votes needed to win
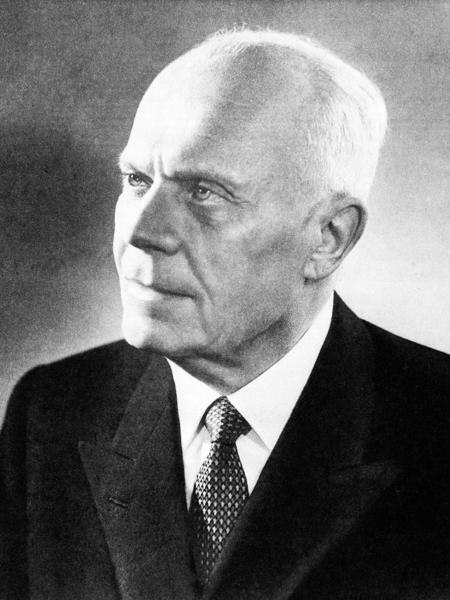
Nominee	Sandro Pertini
Party	PSI
Electoral vote	832
Percentage	82.3%
- Result on the sixteenth ballot (8 July 1978) Pertini 832 Others 36 Invalids, blanks, abstentions 143
President before election
Giovanni Leone
DC
Elected President
Sandro Pertini
PSI

The 1978 Italian presidential election was held in Italy between 29 June and 8 July 1978, following the resignation of incumbent President Giovanni Leone on 15 June 1978 because of the Lockheed bribery scandals.

Only members of Parliament and regional delegates were entitled to vote, most of these electors having been elected in the 1976 general election and in the 1975 regional elections. As head of state of the Italian Republic, the President has a role of representation of national unity and guarantees that Italian politics comply with the Italian Constitution, in the framework of a parliamentary system.

On 8 July 1978 former socialist partisan and President of the Chamber of Deputies Sandro Pertini was elected President with 832 votes out of 1,011, the biggest majority ever obtained by an elected president.

== Procedure ==
In accordance with the Italian Constitution, the election was held in the form of a secret ballot, with the Senators and the Deputies entitled to vote. The election was held in the Palazzo Montecitorio, home of the Chamber of Deputies, with the capacity of the building expanded for the purpose. The first three ballots required a two-thirds majority of the 1,011 voters in order to elect a president, or 675 votes. Starting from the fourth ballot, an absolute majority was required for candidates to be elected, or 506 votes. The presidential mandate lasts seven years.

The election was presided over by the President of the Chamber of Deputies Pietro Ingrao, who proceeded to the public counting of the votes, and by the Vice president of the Senate Luigi Carraro, since President Amintore Fanfani was serving as acting President of the Republic.

== Candidates ==
- Guido Gonella, former Minister, was the first candidate of the Christian Democracy;
- Giorgio Amendola, former partisan, was the candidate of the Italian Communist Party;
- Pietro Nenni, former leader of Italian Socialist Party, was initially proposed by his party;
- Sandro Pertini, one of the most prominent socialist leaders, wasn't voted till the last ballot.

== Political background ==
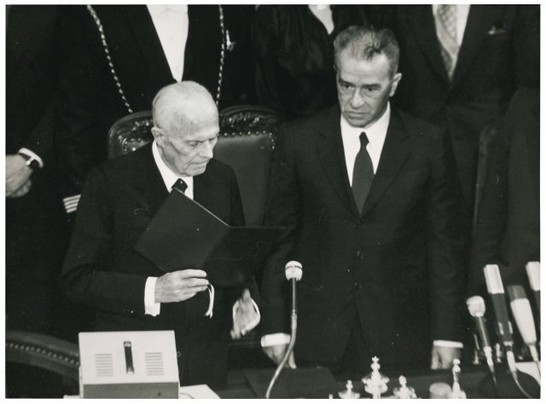
Sandro Pertini taking the oath in front of the Parliament near the President of the Chamber of Deputies Pietro Ingrao on 9 July 1978

The extremely disputed Giovanni Leone's presidency came to an end in June 1978 due to allegations made in the United States over Lockheed bribing a number of high-profile politicians in Italy to purchase Hercules Aircraft for the military. Even if the accusation was never proved, Leone decided to resign in order to prevent the beginning of the so called "white semester" (semestre bianco), the six months period before the end of a presidential mandate during which the President cannot dissolve the Parliament and call a general election.

Leone's resignation came during a very difficult moment for the Italian Republic. Tight in the grip of the Years of Lead and of the strategy of tension, the country had suffered major terrorist attacks during the decade, such as 1974 Piazza della Loggia bombing and 1974 Italicus Express bombing. The climax of tension came in March 1978, when the former Prime Minister Aldo Moro was kidnapped and killed by a unit of the militant far-left organisation known as the Red Brigades while on his way to a session of the Chamber of Deputies where a discussion was to take place regarding a vote of confidence for a new government that would have had for the first time ever the support of the Italian Communist Party. Politically, Moro's stance to find an accommodation between the Christian Democracy and the Italian Communist Party was a way to lead the country out of the tensions and to make the republic institutions more solid and stable as response to domestic terrorism. The Historic Compromise was made possible by the new course inaugurated by the new communist leader Enrico Berlinguer, who in 1973 launched in communist magazine Rinascita a proposal for a "democratic alliance" with Christian Democracy in order to prevent a coup d'état similar to the Chilean one. However, the sudden death of Moro was a hard blow to the Historical Compromise politics and a major defeat for the republic institutions in front of the public opinion.

In that context, in summer 1978 the Italian Parliament convened to elect a new President. After 1976 general election, the left-wing parties together detained now a narrow majority in both houses of the Parliament and claimed the next President must have been a leftist one. After a long negotiation, the parties of the so-called "constitutional arch" (arco costituzionale), an expression used to indicate all the democratic parties represented in Parliament with the exception of the neo-fascist Italian Social Movement, found a deal on the name of the popular socialist lawmaker and former partisan Sandro Pertini.

On 8 July 1978 Pertini was finally elected President with the largest majority ever obtained in an Italian presidential election and sworn in as the new President one day after.

== Results ==
Candidate	First round 29 June 1978	Second round 30 June 1978	Third round 30 June 1978	Fourth round 1 July 1978	Fifth round 2 July 1978	Sixth round 2 July 1978	Seventh round 3 July 1978	Eighth round 4 July 1978	Ninth round 4 July 1978
Guido Gonella	392	383	351	–	–	–	–	–	–
Giorgio Amendola	339	337	339	335	358	350	357	358	357
Pietro Nenni	88	86	81	–	–	–	–	–	–
Orazio Condorelli	26	27	25	–	–	–	–	–	–
Ferruccio Parri	20	21	20	–	–	–	–	–	–
Aldo Bozzi	–	15	35	2	3	–	16	15	12
Luigi Mariotti	–	15	18	–	–	–	–	2	–
Paolo Rossi	–	11	10	11	15	13	15	17	17
Benigno Zaccagnini	–	2	15	–	–	–	–	–	–
Sandro Pertini	–	–	5	4	6	10	4	–	–
Other candidates	29	29	32	27	30	16	17	10	26
Blank papers	79	48	48	77	70	73	136	142	127
Invalid papers	19	2	4	4	2	3	2	1	4
Abstentions	19	28	28	531	534	544	464	466	471
Total	1,011	1,011	1,011	1,011	1,011	1,011	1,011	1,011	1,011

Candidate	Tenth round 5 July 1978	Eleventh round 5 July 1978	Twelfth round 6 July 1978	Thirteenth round 7 July 1978	Fourteenth round 7 July 1978	Fifteenth round 7 July 1978	Sixteenth round 8 July 1978
Giorgio Amendola	355	355	354	364	355	347	4
Aldo Bozzi	11	10	12	10	9	9	–
Luigi Mariotti	–	4	–	3	3	3	–
Paolo Rossi	17	21	22	18	18	15	2
Sandro Pertini	2	–	–	–	3	5	832
Francesco De Martino	–	–	–	4	19	35	9
Other candidates	16	22	20	24	21	22	21
Blank papers	106	91	101	88	76	92	121
Invalid papers	3	2	1	2	1	1	6
Abstentions	501	506	503	500	507	482	17
Total	1,011	1,011	1,011	1,011	1,011	1,011	1,011
Source: Presidency of the Republic
