= 1985 Italian presidential election =

Election of the President of the Italian Republic

| ← 1978 | 24 June 1985 | 1992 → |

1,008 voters (320 Senators, 630 Deputies and 58 regional representatives) 674 (1st–3rd ballots) or 505 (4th ballot onwards) votes needed to win
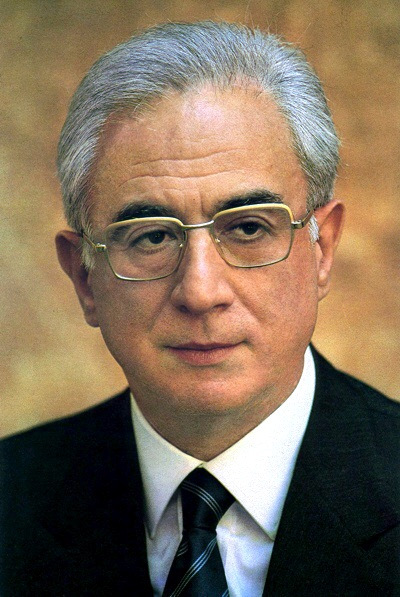
| Nominee | Francesco Cossiga |
| Party | DC |
| Electoral vote | 752 |
| Percentage | 74.6% |
- Result on the first ballot (24 June 1985) Cossiga 752 Others 49 Invalids, blanks, abstentions 207
President before election
Sandro Pertini
PSI
Elected President
Francesco Cossiga
DC

The 1985 Italian presidential election was held on 24 June 1985.

Only members of Parliament and regional delegates were entitled to vote, most of these electors having been elected in the 1983 general election and in the 1985 regional elections. As head of state of the Italian Republic, the President has a role of representation of national unity and guarantees that Italian politics comply with the Italian Constitution, in the framework of a parliamentary system.

As a result of the election, Francesco Cossiga was elected President on the first round with almost 75% of the votes. It was the first time in the history of the Italian Republic that a President had been elected on the first round.

== Procedure ==
In accordance with the Italian Constitution, the election was held in the form of a secret ballot, with the Senators and the Deputies entitled to vote. The election was held in the Palazzo Montecitorio, home of the Chamber of Deputies, with the capacity of the building expanded for the purpose. The first three ballots required a two-thirds majority of the 1,008 voters in order to elect a president, or 673 votes. Starting from the fourth ballot, an absolute majority was required for candidates to be elected, or 505 votes. The presidential mandate lasts seven years.

The election was presided over by the President of the Chamber of Deputies Nilde Iotti, who proceeded to the public counting of the votes, and by the President of the Senate Francesco Cossiga.

== Candidates ==
Francesco Cossiga, former Prime Minister and Minister, member of the Christian Democracy's moderate faction, was first proposed by the party's leader Ciriaco De Mita as the candidate of the governing Pentapartito alliance.

== Political background ==
In the 1980s, for the first time since 1945, two governments were led by non-christian democrat Prime Ministers: a republican (Giovanni Spadolini) and a socialist (Bettino Craxi); while the Christian Democracy remained however the main force supporting the government.

With the end of the Years of Lead, Craxi cabinet was working to restore stability in the Italian politics. The candidacy of the christian democrat Francesco Cossiga, first proposed by the Christian Democracy leader Ciriaco De Mita, was sustained by all the parties which were members of the coalition government (the so called Pentapartito alliance) and also by the communist leader Alessandro Natta.

On 24 June 1985 Cossiga was elected President and officially sworn in on 3 July 1985.

== Results ==
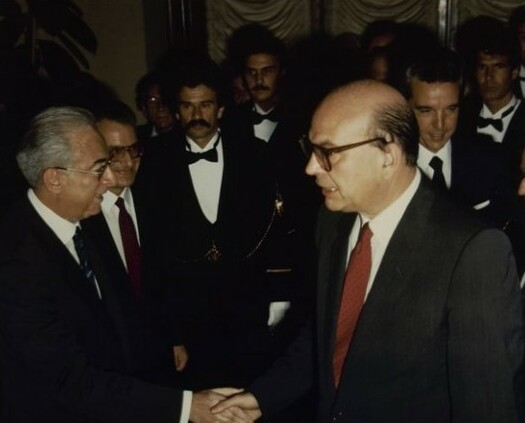
Francesco Cossiga the day of his inauguration with the Prime Minister Bettino Craxi

| Candidate | First round 24 June 1985 |
|---|---|
| Francesco Cossiga | 752 |
| Arnaldo Forlani | 16 |
| Sandro Pertini | 12 |
| Other candidates | 49 |
| Blank papers | 141 |
| Invalid papers | 7 |
| Abstentions | 31 |
| Total | 1,008 |
Source: Presidency of the Republic
