= 1946 Italian provisional head of state election =

1st election of the Head of State of the Italian Republic

1946 Italian presidential election
- 28 June 1946

576 members of the Constituent Assembly 344 votes needed to win
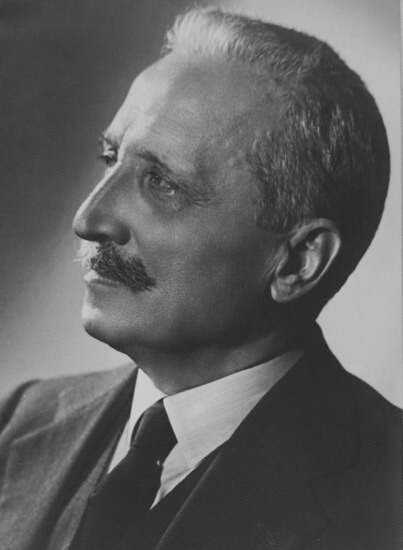
Nominee	Enrico De Nicola
Party	PLI
Electoral vote	396
Percentage	69.1%
Head of State (provisional) before election
Alcide De Gasperi (Note: ad interim and ex officio as Prime Minister of Italy)
DC
Elected Head of State (provisional)
Enrico De Nicola
PLI

The 1946 Italian presidential election was undertaken to elect a provisional head of the Italian State on 28 June 1946.

== Background ==
After the departure of former King Umberto II of Italy on 13 June 1946, following the abolition of the monarchy, the functions of head of state had provisionally been exercised by Prime Minister Alcide De Gasperi, to which he was entrusted until the beginning of July when, following election as Provisional Head of State, Enrico De Nicola was sworn in before the Constituent Assembly as president.

They are not considered presidential elections, as this institution did not yet exist. However, De Nicola assumed this title according to the first transitional provision of the Constitution in 1948.

== Result ==
Candidate	1st Round
Enrico De Nicola	396
Cipriano Facchinetti	40
Ottavia Penna Buscemi	32
Vittorio Emanuele Orlando	12
Carlo Sforza	2
Alcide De Gasperi	1
Alfredo Proja	1
Other candidates	--
Blank papers	14
Invalid papers	6
Voting	504
Total	573
Source: Parliament of Italy
