= 1955 Italian presidential election =

Election of the President of the Italian Republic

- 28–29 April 1955

843 voters (217 Senators, 616 Deputies and 10 regional representatives) 562 (1st–3rd ballots) or 422 (4th ballot onwards) votes needed to win
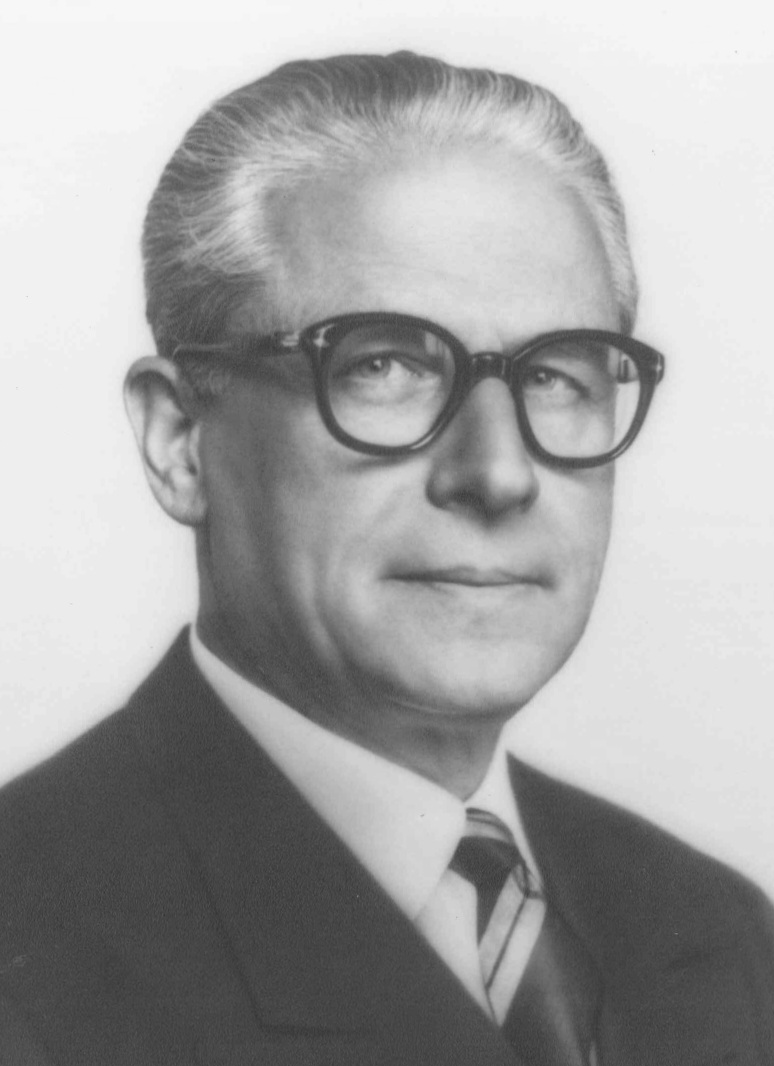
Nominee	Giovanni Gronchi
Party	DC
Electoral vote	658
Percentage	78.1%
- Result on the fourth ballot (29 April 1955) Gronchi 658 Einaudi 70 Others 81 Invalids, blanks, abstentions and absents 104
President before election
Luigi Einaudi
PLI
Elected President
Giovanni Gronchi
DC

The 1955 Italian presidential election was held in Italy on 28–29 April 1955. Giovanni Gronchi, President of the Chamber of Deputies, was elected President of Italy

Only members of Parliament and regional delegates were entitled to vote, most of these electors having been elected in the 1953 general election.

== Procedure ==
In accordance with the Italian Constitution, the election was held in the form of a secret ballot, with the Senators and the Deputies entitled to vote. The election was held in the Palazzo Montecitorio, home of the Chamber of Deputies, with the capacity of the building expanded for the purpose. The first three ballots required a two-thirds majority of the 843 voters in order to elect a president, or 562 votes. Starting from the fourth ballot, an absolute majority was required for candidates to be elected, or 422 votes.

The election was presided over by the President of the Chamber of Deputies Giovanni Gronchi, who proceeded to the public counting of the votes, and by the President of the Senate Cesare Merzagora.

== Proposed nominees ==
- Ferruccio Parri, former Prime Minister, was proposed by the Republican Party and sustained by left-wing parties;
- Cesare Merzagora, incumbent President of the Senate, was the first proposal of Christian Democrat leader Amintore Fanfani; his proposal was subsequently withdrawn after the leftist internal faction of the party did not vote for him;
- Giovanni Gronchi, incumbent President of the Chamber of Deputies, was initially voted by left-wing DC internal faction and by some left-wing representatives; he obtained a larger consent only on the fourth round of voting;
- Luigi Einaudi, outgoing President, was proposed for a second mandate by the Liberal Party.

== Chronology ==
On 28 April 1955, the Italian Parliament convened to elect the new President of the Republic, since President Luigi Einaudi's term was about to end. After the death of Alcide De Gasperi, the new leader of Christian Democracy party Amintore Fanfani decided to endorse the candidacy of the incumbent President of the Senate Cesare Merzagora, but failed to control his own party's representatives, who on the first ballot succeeded in making Merzagora's candidacy sink.

On the first round, left-wing parties decided to sustain the actionist Ferruccio Parri, while liberals and monarchists decided to vote for the outgoing President Luigi Einaudi.

After Merzagora's candidacy failed to gain a large majority, Fanfani decided to endorse the incumbent President of the Chamber of Deputies Giovanni Gronchi. As a member of the leftist faction of the Christian Democracy, Gronchi was able to gain the support of left-wing parties. On 29 April 1955 on the fourth-round vote, Gronchi was elected the new President of Italian Republic by a large margin.

== Results ==
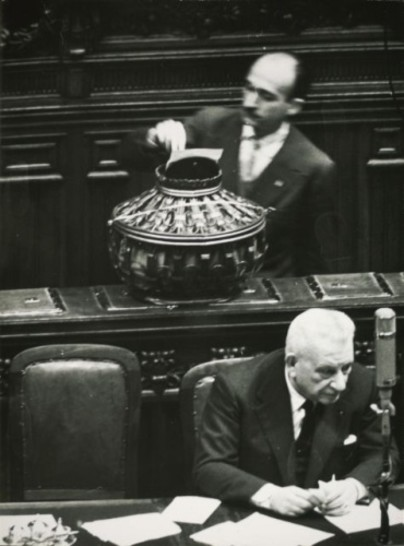
Deputy Giorgio Almirante casts his vote on 28 April 1955

Candidate	First round 28 April 1955	Second round 28 April 1955	Third round 29 April 1955	Fourth round 29 April 1955
Ferruccio Parri	308	–	–	–
Cesare Merzagora	228	225	245	–
Luigi Einaudi	120	80	61	70
Giovanni Gronchi	30	127	281	658
Antonio Segni	12	18	14	–
Raffaele De Caro	–	–	14	–
Other candidates	23	24	7	11
Blank papers	89	332	195	92
Invalid papers	5	2	2	2
Abstentions	28	35	26	10
Total	843	843	843	843
Source: Presidency of the Republic

== Inauguration ==
Giovanni Gronchi officially sworn in as the new President of Italy on 11 May 1955.

=== Gallery ===
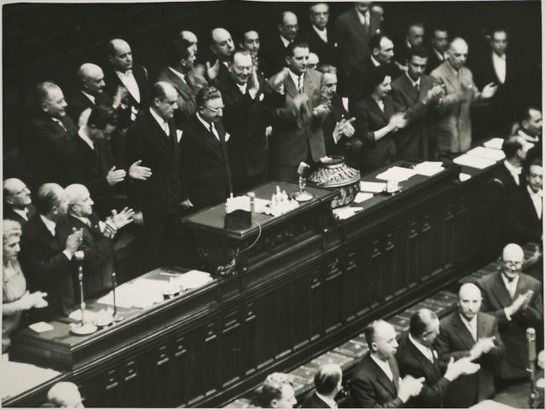
The moment in which Gronchi was proclaimed elected

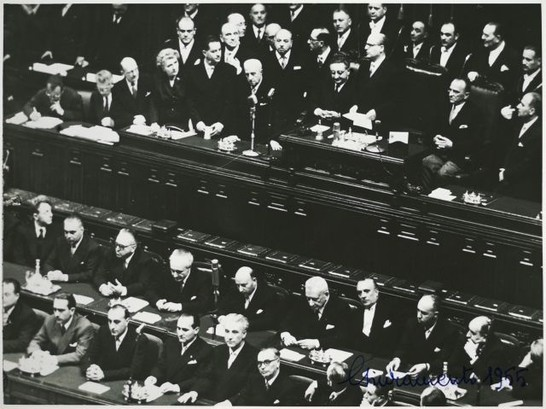
Gronchi during his inaugural address on 11 May 1955

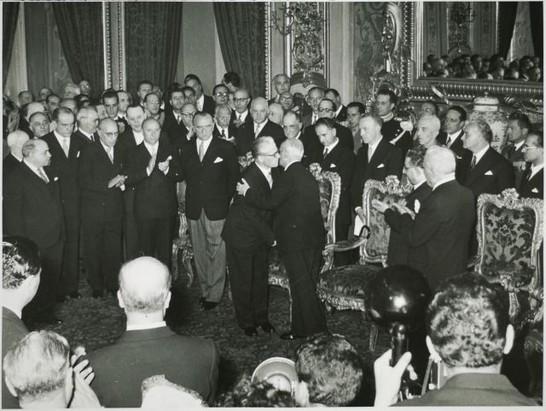
Gronchi and Einaudi during the swearing in ceremony at the Quirinal Palace
