= 1992 Italian presidential election =

Election of the President of the Italian Republic

- 13–25 May 1992

1,014 voters (326 Senators, 630 Deputies and 58 regional representatives) 676 (1st–3rd ballots) or 508 (4th ballot onwards) votes needed to win
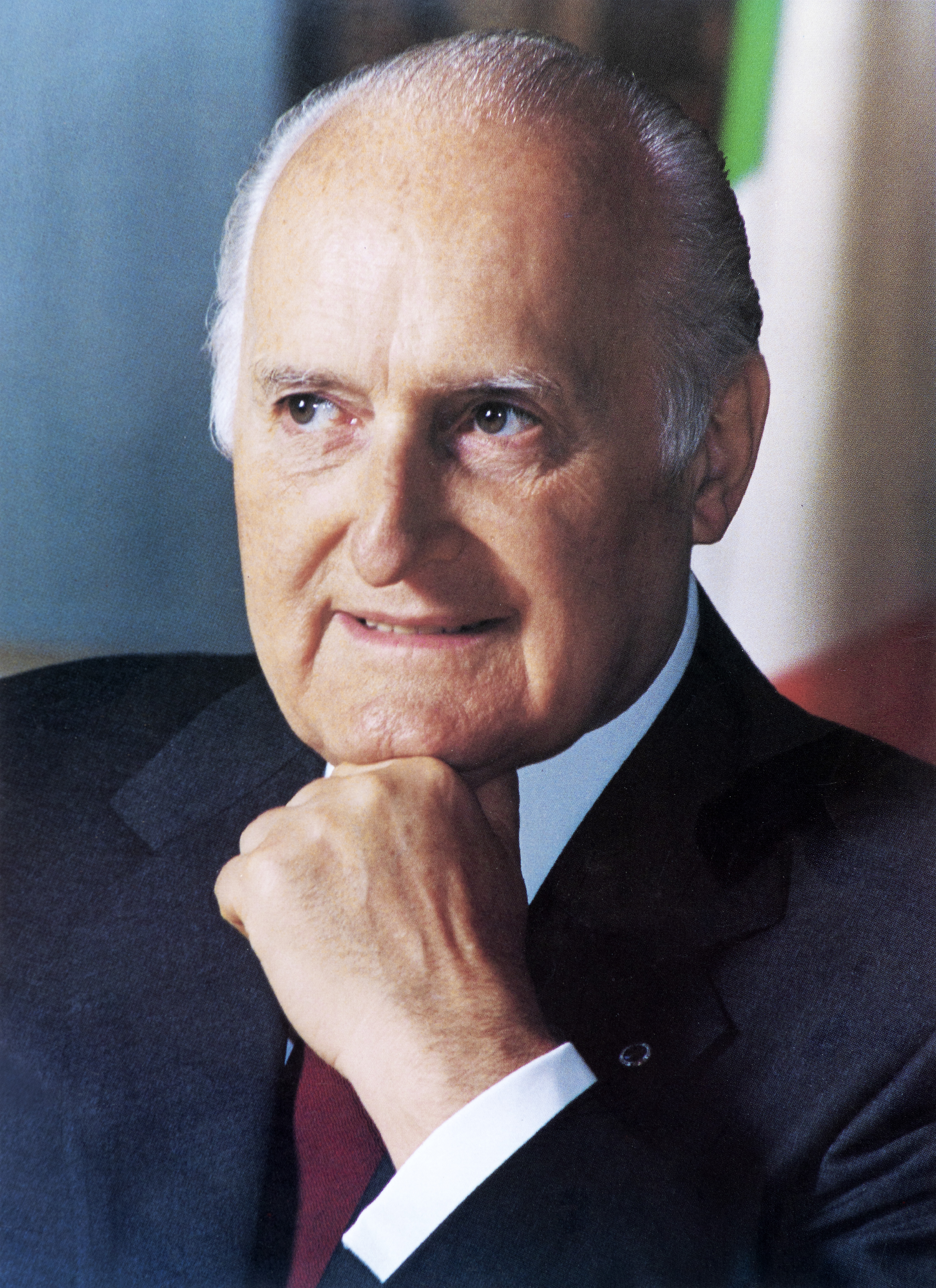

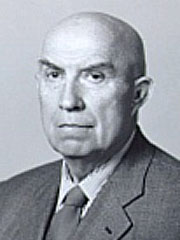
Nominee	Oscar Luigi Scalfaro	Gianfranco Miglio
Party	DC	Lega Nord
Electoral vote	672	75
Percentage	66.3%	7.4%
- Result on the sixteenth ballot (25 May 1992) Scalfaro 672 Miglio 75 Others 206 Invalids, blanks, abstentions 61
President before election
Francesco Cossiga
DC
Elected President
Oscar Luigi Scalfaro
DC

The 1992 Italian presidential election was held in Italy on 13–25 May 1992, following the resignation of President Francesco Cossiga on 28 April 1992.

Only members of Parliament and regional delegates were entitled to vote, most of these electors having been elected in the 1992 general election and in the 1990 regional elections. As head of state of the Italian Republic, the president has a role of representation of national unity and guarantees that Italian politics comply with the Italian Constitution, in the framework of a parliamentary system.

== Procedure ==
In accordance with the Italian Constitution, the election was held in the form of a secret ballot, with the Senators and the Deputies entitled to vote. The election was held in the Palazzo Montecitorio, home of the Chamber of Deputies, with the capacity of the building expanded for the purpose. The first three ballots required a two-thirds majority of the 1,014 voters in order to elect a president, or 676 votes. Starting from the fourth ballot, an absolute majority was required for candidates to be elected, or 508 votes. The presidential mandate lasts seven years.

The election was presided over by the president of the Chamber of Deputies Oscar Luigi Scalfaro, who proceeded to the public counting of the votes (with the exception of the last ballot when the count was made by the vice president Stefano Rodotà), and by the vice president of the Senate Luigi Granelli, since the Senate president Giovanni Spadolini was serving as acting president of the Republic.

== Candidates ==
- Giorgio De Giuseppe, Vice President of the Senate, was the official candidate of Christian Democracy in the first three ballots;
- Nilde Iotti, former President of the Chamber of Deputies, was the candidate of the Democratic Party of the Left;
- Giuliano Vassalli was the candidate of the Italian Socialist Party;
- Gianfranco Miglio was the candidate of the Northern League;
- Oscar Luigi Scalfaro, President of the Chamber of Deputies, backed on the last ballot by almost all parties.

== Political background ==
On 28 April 1992 President Francesco Cossiga resigned two months before the end of his term. The reason of his resignation was related to a growing tension between Cossiga and Prime Minister Giulio Andreotti. This tension emerged in October 1990 when Andreotti revealed the existence of Gladio, a stay-behind organization with the official aim of countering a possible Soviet invasion through sabotage and guerrilla warfare behind enemy lines. Cossiga acknowledged his involvement in the establishment of the organization. Subsequently, in 1991 the Democratic Party of the Left asked to start a procedure of impeachment against him (Presidents of Italy can be impeached only for high treason against the State or for an attempt to overthrow the Constitution). Although he threatened to prevent the impeachment procedure by dissolving Parliament, the impeachment request was ultimately dismissed.

At the beginning of the 1990s, Italian politics was undergoing a period of instability and growing tensions. In February 1991, the Northern League, which was first launched as an upgrade of the Northern Alliance in December 1989, was officially transformed into a party through the merger of various regional parties, notably including Lombard League and Venetian League, under the leadership of Umberto Bossi. These continue to exist as "national sections" of the federal party, which presents itself in regional and local contests as "Northern League–Lombard League", "Northern League–Venetian League", "Northern League Piedmont", and so on. The League exploited resentment against the centralised, Rome-based Italian government (with the famous slogan Roma ladrona, "Rome (is a) robber"), common in the North as many there felt that the government wasted resources collected mostly from northerners' taxes. Cultural influences from bordering countries in the North and resentment against illegal immigrants were also exploited. The party's electoral successes began roughly at a time when public disillusionment with the established political parties was at its height. The Tangentopoli corruption scandals, which invested most of the established parties, were unveiled from 1992 on. However, contrarily to what many pundits observed at the beginning of the 1990s, LN became a stable political force and it is by far the oldest party among those represented in the Italian Parliament. The Northern League's first electoral breakthrough was at the 1990 regional elections, but it was with the 1992 general election that the party emerged as a leading political actor. Having gained 8.7% of the vote, 56 deputies and 26 senators, it became the fourth largest party of the country and within Parliament.

In 1991 the Italian Communist Party split into the Democratic Party of the Left, led by Achille Occhetto, and the Communist Refoundation Party, headed by Armando Cossutta. Occhetto, leader of the communists since 1988, stunned the party faithfully assembled in a working-class section of Bologna with a speech heralding the end of communism, a move now referred to in Italian politics as the svolta della Bolognina (Bolognina turning point). The collapse of the communist governments in the Soviet Union and Eastern Europe had convinced Occhetto that the era of Eurocommunism was over, and he transformed the Communist Party into a progressive left-wing party, the Democratic Party of the Left. A third of the Communist Party's former members, led by Cossutta, refused to join the PDS, and instead founded the Communist Refoundation Party.

On 17 February 1992, judge Antonio Di Pietro had Mario Chiesa, a member of the Italian Socialist Party, arrested for accepting a bribe from a Milan cleaning firm. The Italian Socialist Party distanced themselves from Chiesa. Bettino Craxi called Mario Chiesa mariuolo, or "villain", a "wild splinter" of the otherwise clean PSI. Upset over this treatment by his former colleagues, Chiesa began to give information about corruption implicating his colleagues. This marked the beginning of the Mani pulite investigation; news of political corruption began spreading in the press.

The 1992 general election, held on 5 April that year, marked a huge earthquake for the Italian politics. Christian Democracy suffered a significant swing against it, but the coalition it had led prior to the elections managed to retain a small majority. Opposition parties won a significant amount of support. The resulting parliament was therefore weak and difficult to bring to an agreement. The so-called "CAF" alliance (the Craxi-Andreotti-Forlani axis), a pact to revive the Pentapartito coalition—the scheme was conceived in 1991 to allow Giulio Andreotti to become the next President of the Italian Republic and Bettino Craxi to become the next Prime Minister—had been heavily crushed by the popular vote.

In this context, the Italian Parliament convened to elect the new president on 13 May 1992. As the count progressed no candidate was able to emerge, not even Giulio Andreotti whose candidacy was soon made to sink, and the voting process ended up in a real political deadlock. While the count was still ongoing, on 23 May 1992 the popular anti-Mafia magistrate Giovanni Falcone, his wife and three police escort agents were killed by a bomb put on the Highway A29 by the Sicilian mafia near Capaci. The huge wave of public indignation and anger for this crime forced the Parliament to quickly elect a new president and solve the political deadlock. On 25 May 1992, the President of the Chamber of Deputies Oscar Luigi Scalfaro, seen as a man above the parts and as a true defender of the republican institutions, was finally elected president and officially sworn in on 28 May 1992.

== Results ==
Candidate	1st	2nd	3rd	4th	5th	6th	7th	8th	9th	10th	11th	12th	13th	14th	15th	16th
Giorgio De Giuseppe	296	284	257	–	–	–	–	–	–	–	–	–	–	–	–	–
Nilde Iotti	183	182	245	256	249	235	233	214	3	2	–	–	–	2	–	4
Giuliano Vassalli	152	143	139	–	–	–	3	–	2	6	188	189	171	351	2	6
Paolo Volponi	51	51	–	–	–	–	–	–	–	–	–	–	–	–	–	50
Norberto Bobbio	26	25	25	23	24	25	31	6	6	9	–	9	2	–	–	–
Antonio Cariglia	20	23	21	–	–	–	–	–	–	–	–	–	–	–	–	–
Tina Anselmi	19	18	3	–	–	–	3	18	18	19	15	18	17	4	–	–
Salvatore Valitutti	19	21	22	21	–	–	–	–	–	–	–	–	–	–	–	–
Gianfranco Miglio	–	78	77	77	75	76	79	82	78	77	77	80	79	79	74	75
Alfredo Pazzaglia	–	48	47	49	51	54	3	–	–	–	–	–	–	–	–	–
Mino Martinazzoli	6	13	29	–	6	3	2	2	–	2	–	–	6	3	2	–
Giovanni Spadolini	6	8	20	28	35	34	11	11	6	16	13	23	20	20	22	7
Emilio Colombo	5	9	17	–	–	–	–	–	–	–	–	–	–	–	–	–
Arnaldo Forlani	–	–	–	–	469	479	6	–	–	–	–	–	–	8	10	7
Oscar Luigi Scalfaro	6	8	8	7	6	10	13	25	24	24	10	9	7	21	17	672
Guido Carli	–	–	–	–	–	–	19	20	13	–	–	–	–	–	2	–
Roland Riz	–	–	–	–	–	–	12	13	12	–	–	–	14	–	13	–
Ettore Gallo	–	–	–	–	–	–	–	–	52	56	–	68	192	52	51	–
Vincenzo Muccioli	–	–	–	–	–	–	–	7	46	–	–	–	–	–	–	–
Augusto Barbera	–	–	–	–	–	–	–	–	19	24	–	–	–	–	–	–
Francesco De Martino	–	–	–	–	–	–	–	2	10	4	235	–	–	–	–	–
Giovanni Conso	–	–	–	–	–	–	–	–	3	32	23	22	22	253	235	4
Aldo Aniasi	–	–	–	–	–	–	–	–	–	14	–	–	–	–	20	–
Cesare Dujany	–	–	–	–	–	–	–	–	–	12	12	–	–	–	–	–
Paolo Borsellino	–	–	–	–	–	–	–	–	–	–	47	–	–	–	–	–
Leo Valiani	–	–	–	–	–	–	–	–	–	–	–	–	2	44	3	36
Amintore Fanfani	–	–	–	–	–	–	–	–	–	–	–	–	–	12	–	–
Francesco Cossiga	–	2	–	2	–	–	–	2	–	3	–	2	4	–	23	63
Giulio Andreotti	–	4	2	2	3	–	–	–	–	–	–	–	–	8	11	6
Other candidates	29	23	32	13	5	6	23	40	40	74	17	32	35	51	55	23
Blank papers	45	46	32	31	71	76	216	175	300	257	25	159	35	33	397	38
Invalid papers	6	6	9	2	2	1	10	7	3	4	1	4	–	12	4	11
Voting	869	991	981	511	993	994	664	625	642	635	663	614	606	936	941	1,002
Present	869	991	981	833	993	994	986	923	942	940	967	918	908	982	942	1,002
Source: Parliament of Italy
