= Enrico De Nicola =

President of Italy in 1948

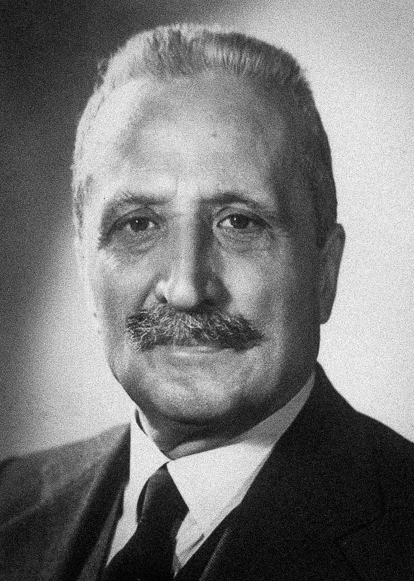
- Official portrait, 1948

President of Italy
- In office 1 January 1948 – 12 May 1948
- Prime Minister: Alcide De Gasperi
- Preceded by: Himself as provisional head of State
- Succeeded by: Luigi Einaudi

Provisional Head of State of Italy
- In office 1 July 1946 – 31 December 1947
- Prime Minister: Alcide De Gasperi
- Preceded by: Alcide De Gasperi
- Succeeded by: Position abolished

President of the Constitutional Court
- In office 23 January 1956 – 26 March 1957
- Preceded by: Position established
- Succeeded by: Gaetano Azzariti

President of the Senate of the Republic
- In office 28 April 1951 – 24 June 1952
- Preceded by: Ivanoe Bonomi
- Succeeded by: Giuseppe Paratore

President of the Chamber of Deputies
- In office 26 June 1920 – 25 January 1924
- Preceded by: Vittorio Emanuele Orlando
- Succeeded by: Alfredo Rocco
Parliamentary offices
Member of the Senate of the Republic
Ex officio
Life tenure 12 May 1948 – 1 October 1959
Member of the Senate of the Kingdom
In office 2 March 1939 – 3 August 1943
| Appointed by | Victor Emmanuel III |
Member of the Chamber of Deputies
In office 24 March 1909 – 25 January 1924
| Constituency | Afragola (1909–1919); Naples (1919–1924) |

Personal details
- Born: 9 November 1877 Naples, Campania, Kingdom of Italy
- Died: 1 October 1959 (aged 81) Torre del Greco, Campania, Italy
- Party: Italian Liberal Party
- Education: University of Naples Federico II
- Profession: Lawyer

Enrico De Nicola (Italian: [enˈriːko de niˈkɔːla]; 9 November 1877 – 1 October 1959) was an Italian jurist, journalist, politician, and statesman who served as the first president of Italy in 1948 and provisional head of state of republican Italy from 1946 to 1948.

== Biography ==
Enrico De Nicola was born in Naples and became famous as a penal lawyer. He studied law at the University of Naples, graduating in 1896. As a Liberal, he was elected a deputy for the first time in 1909 and, from 1913 to 1921, he filled minor governmental posts until the advent of fascism, when he retired from political life. He served as Under-Secretary of State for the Colonies in the Giolitti government (November 1913 — March 1914) and Under-Secretary of State for the Treasury in the Orlando cabinet (January–June 1919). On 26 June 1920, he was elected speaker of the Chamber of Deputies, holding office until January 1924. He was appointed senator by King Victor Emmanuel III in 1929, but he refused to take his seat and never took part in the workings of the Assembly.

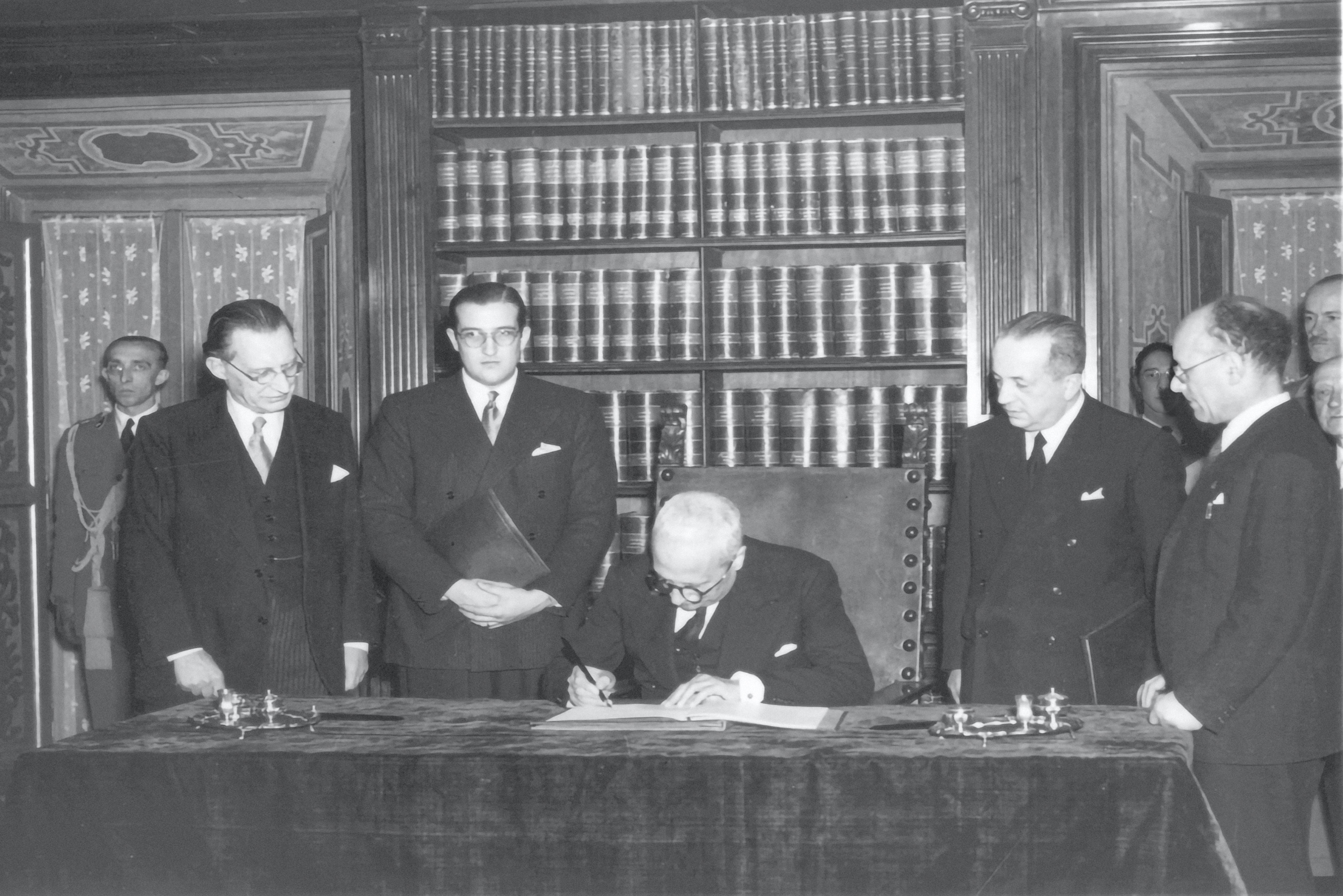
De Nicola signs the Italian Constitution on 27 December 1947

He returned to his law practice, only taking an interest in politics again after the fall of Italian Fascism. After Benito Mussolini's fall from power in 1943, king Victor Emmanuel tried to extricate the monarchy from its collaboration with the Fascist regime; De Nicola was perhaps the most influential mediator in the ensuing transition. The king's son Umberto acquired a new title of "Lieutenant-General of the Realm" and took over most of the functions of the sovereign. Victor Emanuel later abdicated; Umberto became king as Umberto II and a Constitutional Referendum was held, won by republicans. A new Constituent Assembly was elected, and prime minister Alcide De Gasperi became acting head of state for a few weeks when Umberto II was exiled and left Italy. The Constituent Assembly then elected De Nicola Provisional Head of State on 28 June 1946, with 80% of the votes, at the first round of voting. Giulio Andreotti later recalled that De Nicola — a man of great modesty — was not sure whether to accept the nomination and underwent frequent changes of mind in the face of repeated insistence by all the major political leaders. Andreotti recalled that the journalist Manlio Lupinacci then issued an appeal to De Nicola in the pages of Il Giornale d'Italia: "Your Excellency, please, decide to decide if you can accept to accept..."

On 25 June 1947, De Nicola resigned from the post, citing health reasons, but the Constituent Assembly immediately re-elected him again the following day, having recognized in his act signs of nobility and humility. After the Italian Constitution took effect, he was formally named the "President of the Italian Republic" on 1 January 1948. He finally refused to be a candidate for the first constitutional election the following May, in which Luigi Einaudi was elected to the Quirinale, the formal seat of the Italian presidency.

In 1948, De Nicola became a senator for life as a former Head of State, and later was elected President of the Senate, and of the Constitutional Court. He died at Torre del Greco, in the province of Naples, on 1 October 1959. He was unmarried and had no children.

== Honours ==
– Order of the Star of Italian Solidarity

– Order of Merit of the Italian Republic (1956)

== Political titles ==
His other political titles included President of the Italian Chamber of Deputies, Temporary Chief of the Italian State and President of the Italian Senate.

== Bibliography and notes ==
- Andrea Jelardi, Enrico De Nicola. Il presidente galantuomo, Kairòs, Naples (2009). (in Italian)

Political offices
| Preceded by Vittorio Emanuele Orlando | President of the Chamber of Deputies; 1920–1924 | Succeeded by Alfredo Rocco |
| Preceded by Alcide De Gasperi | Provisional Head of State of Italy; Acting; 1946 | Succeeded by Himself as President of Italy |
| Preceded by Himself as Provisional Head of State of Italy | President of Italy; 1948 | Succeeded by Luigi Einaudi |
| Preceded by Ivanoe Bonomi | President of the Senate of the Republic; 1951–1952 | Succeeded by Giuseppe Paratore |
Legal offices
| New office | President of the Constitutional Court; 1956–1957 | Succeeded by Gaetano Azzariti |
