= President of Italy =

Head of state

President of the Italian Republic
- Presidente della Repubblica Italiana
- Presidential cipher

- Presidential standard

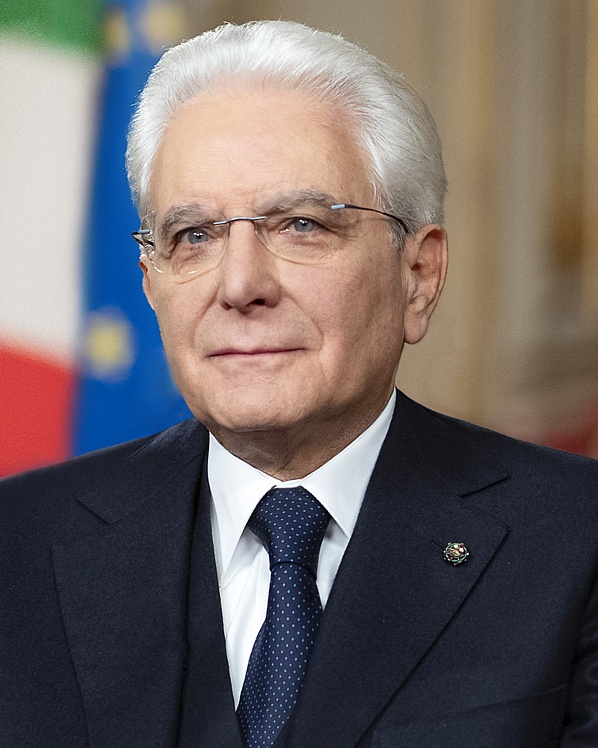
- Incumbent; Sergio Mattarella since 3 February 2015
- Style: Mr President (informal); His Excellency (diplomatic)
- Status: Head of state Commander-in-chief
- Member of: High Council of Defence; High Council of the Judiciary
- Residence: Quirinal Palace
- Appointer: Italian Parliament and regional representatives
- Term length: Seven years, renewable
- Constituting instrument: Constitution of Italy (1948)
- Precursor: King of Italy
- Inaugural holder: Enrico De Nicola
- Formation: 1 January 1948; 78 years ago
- Deputy: President of the Italian Senate
- Salary: €230,000 annually
- Website: quirinale.it

The president of Italy, officially titled President of the Italian Republic (Italian: presidente della Repubblica Italiana), is the head of state of Italy. In that role, the president represents national unity and guarantees that Italian politics comply with the Constitution of Italy. The president is the commander-in-chief of the Italian Armed Forces and chairs the High Council of the Judiciary. The president serves a seven-year term, with no term limits. The incumbent president of the Republic is Sergio Mattarella, a former constitutional judge who was elected on 31 January 2015, and re-elected on 29 January 2022.

== Qualifications for office ==
The framers of the Constitution intended for the president to be an elder statesman of some stature. Article 84 states that any Italian citizen who is fifty or older on election day and enjoys civil and political rights can be elected president. The article also states that the presidency is incompatible with any other office; therefore, the president-elect must resign any other position before being sworn in.

The 1948 Constitution sets the presidential term at seven years. It does not put any term limit on the presidency, although until 2013 no president ever ran for a second term. On 20 April 2013, President Giorgio Napolitano agreed to run for a second term in an attempt to break the parliamentary deadlock in the 2013 Italian presidential election and was duly re-elected the same day. However, he made it clear that he would not serve his full term and resigned in January 2015.

== Election ==
The president of the Italian Republic is elected by an electoral college, consisting of the members of both chambers of the Italian Parliament, and 58 special electors appointed by the regions.

Electoral body	Type of members	Number of members	Comments
Chamber of Deputies	elected Deputies	400	
Senate of the Republic	elected Senators	200	
Senate of the Republic	appointed Senators for life	up to 5	the President appoints up to five Senators; before 2020 the number could vary somewhat
Senate of the Republic	former Presidents of the Republic	unlimited	all former Presidents serve ex officio, unless they resign
Regions	Special Electors	58	each regional council appoints three electors, except for Aosta Valley, which due to its small size only appoints one
Total		658–663 + former presidents	

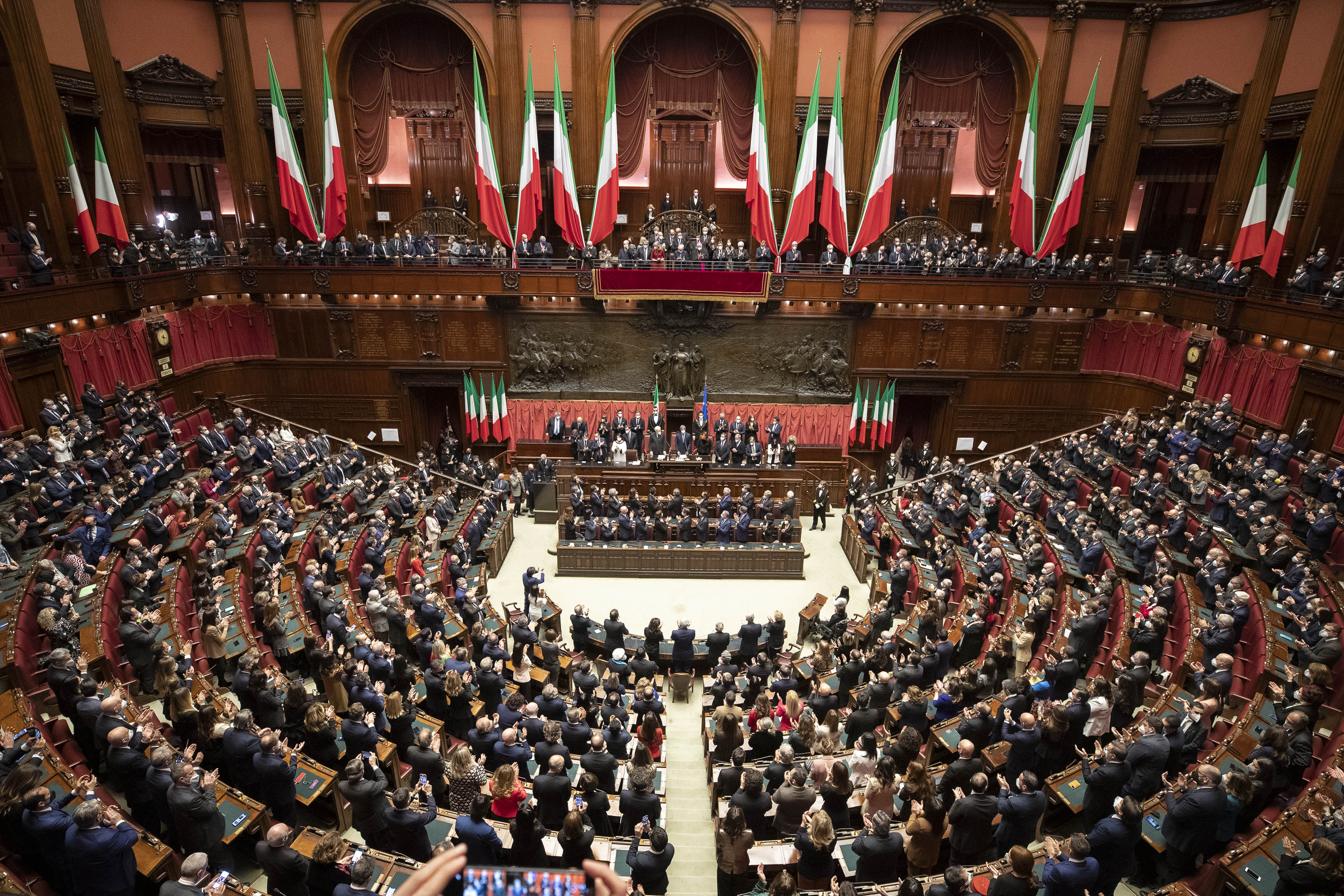
Second inauguration of Sergio Mattarella in front of the Italian Parliament on 3 February 2022

Prior to the 2020 Italian constitutional referendum, which reduced the number of elected parliament members, the electoral college was much larger, with 1,009 members participating in the 2022 Italian presidential election. According to the Constitution, the election must be held by a secret ballot, with the senators, deputies and regional representatives all being required to vote. A two-thirds vote is required to elect on any of the first three rounds of balloting; after that, a simple majority suffices. The number of rounds has often been large thanks to the secret ballot and fragmented nature of the Italian Parliament.

The election is presided over by the president of the Chamber of Deputies, who calls for the public counting of the votes. The vote is held in the Palazzo Montecitorio, seat of the Chamber of Deputies, which is expanded and re-configured for the event. There is no formal personal candidacy but only proposals from groups within the electoral college or from groups of citizens, so any citizen may be voted for or elected, regardless of any expressed intention to be a candidate. Members of the electoral college, mostly being part of political parties, can make public or undisclosed agreements between each other on a name to vote as a candidate, but the votes during the ballot remain secret as only the candidate's name is revealed but not the voter who wrote it so it's not always clear, especially to the public, if such agreements are there and if a party or a group of voters actually comply with them during a ballot.

For these reasons, during the ballots, there could be votes for public figures not related to politics (actors, singers, soccer players, for example or even fictitious characters) or non-feasible candidates. Those kinds of votes are not fully beyond a political strategy, considering they're secret and that the first ballots require a larger winning majority. They may be used to express discontent about the potential actual candidates, to test or show if a candidate is willing to become president at that moment, to spoil secondary candidates in order to increase interest in main candidates for future ballots, to spoil a potential candidate of the adversary party at the first ballots or to let other parties express their more interesting candidates before a potential winning ballot. Often, a successful vote is reached when the major political parties within the chambers reach an agreement on a willing candidate before that final ballot, and their members comply with such an agreement during the vote.

== Presidential mandate ==
Standard of former presidents of Italy.

The president of the Italian Republic assumes office after taking an oath before the Italian Parliament and delivering a presidential address. The presidential term lasts seven years. This prevents any officeholder from being reelected by the same houses, which have a five-year mandate, also granting some freedom from excessive political ties to the appointing body. The president's term may end prematurely by voluntary resignation, death in office, permanent disability due to serious illness, or impeachment and conviction for the crimes of high treason or attack on the Constitution. A former president of the Republic is called president emeritus of the Republic and becomes Senator for life ex officio. In the absence of the president of the Republic, including travel abroad, presidential functions are performed by the president of the Senate of the Republic.

== Legal powers ==
The Constitution lays out the duties and powers of the president of the republic, including the following:

1. In foreign affairs:
  - Accrediting and receiving diplomatic functionaries.
  - Ratifying international treaties upon authorization of Parliament (if required according to Article 80 of the Constitution).
  - Making official visits abroad, accompanied by a member of the government.
  - Declaring a state of war as decided by Parliament.
2. In parliamentary affairs:
  - Appointing senators for life (that may be up to five altogether).
  - Calling the Chambers of Parliament into extraordinary session and dissolving them.
  - Calling elections and fixing the date for the first meeting of the new Chambers.
3. In legislative matters:
  - Authorizing the presentation of proposed governmental bills to Parliament.
  - Promulgating the laws approved by the Parliament.
  - Sending a bill back to the parliament (with an explanation) and asking for its reconsideration (only permitted once per bill).
4. Regarding popular sovereignty.
  - Calling referendums.
5. In executive matters and as to official protocol.
  - Appointing the prime minister of Italy and Cabinet ministers on the advice of the prime minister.
  - Receiving the oath of the government.
  - Accepting the resignation of a government.
  - Promulgating government decrees. Without further approval by Parliament, these measures expire after 60 days.
  - Appointing certain high state functionaries.
  - Presiding over the Consiglio Supremo di Difesa (Supreme Defence Council) and commanding all the armed forces.
  - Decreeing the dissolution of regional councils and the removal of presidents of regions.
6. In judicial matters:
  - Presiding over the Consiglio Superiore della Magistratura (Superior Judicial Council).
  - Appointing 5 members (one-third) of the Constitutional Court of Italy.
  - Granting pardons and commutations.
  - Cannot be punished for acts pertaining to his office unless guilty of high treason or violation of the Constitution. (article 90 of the Italian constitution)
  - It is a crime to undermine his honour or prestige. (article 278 of the Italian penal code)
7. Others:
  - Granting honors.

In practice, the president's office has little real independent authority. The Constitution provides that nearly all presidential acts must be countersigned by the prime minister or an individual minister since actual political responsibility rests with the government. Most presidential powers are only formal and must be exercised through the government, while many of the others are duties that the president is required to perform; however, pardons and commutations have been recognized as autonomous powers of the president.

The president's role is not entirely ceremonial. For example, the president’s ability to send a piece of legislation back to Parliament is not taken lightly by legislators. While the president is required to promulgate the law if it is passed a second time, in practice, legislators are unlikely to ignore his objections to legislation unless the measure is critical. Moreover, the president's few powers expand when there is no clear majority in Parliament. During these times, the president has significant latitude in appointing prime ministers, such as when President Oscar Luigi Scalfaro appointed Lamberto Dini as prime minister against the wishes of outgoing Prime Minister Silvio Berlusconi, or when President Napolitano appointed Mario Monti in 2011 and Enrico Letta in 2013.

This latitude extends even further to cabinet appointments, as in 2018 when President Mattarella blocked the appointment of Paolo Savona to the Ministry of Economy and Finance. Mattarella felt that Savona's Euroscepticism would endanger Italy's relationship with the European Union; he took the line that as the guardian of the Constitution, he could not allow this to happen.

== Succession ==
Standard of the Substitute President of the Republic

According to Article 86 of the Constitution, in all the cases in which the president is unable to perform the functions of the office, these shall be performed by the president of the Senate, who would temporarily serve as acting president of Italy. In the event of permanent incapacity, death in office or resignation of the president, the president of the Chamber of Deputies shall call an election of a new president within fifteen days, notwithstanding the longer term envisaged during the dissolution of the Parliament or in the three months preceding dissolution.

== Residence ==
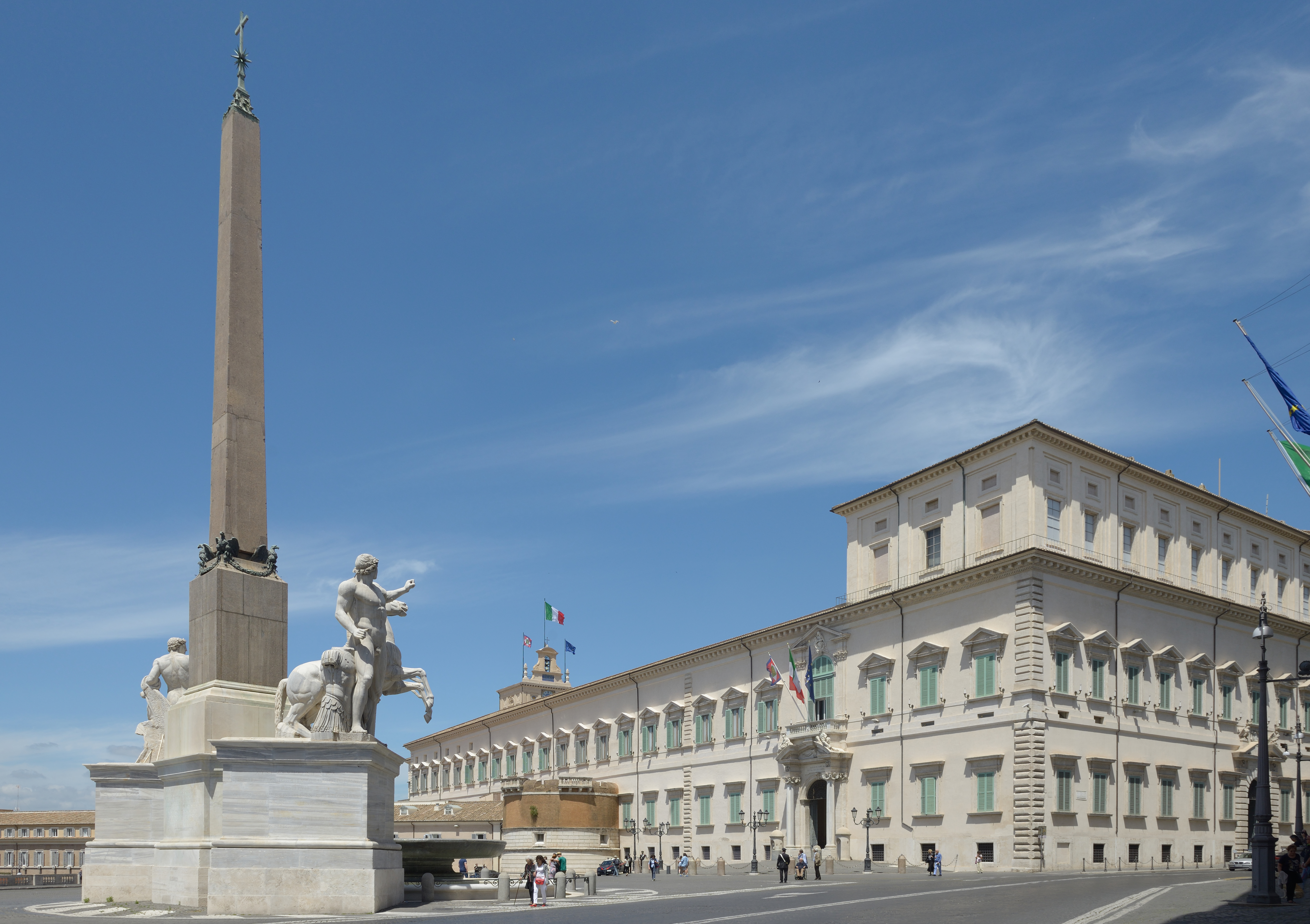
Quirinal Palace, the principal residence of the president

The officeholder resides in Rome at the Quirinal Palace and also has at his disposal the presidential holdings of Castelporziano, near Rome and Villa Rosebery in Naples. The residence at the Quirinal is guarded by the Corazzieri, an elite cuirassier honor guard that is part of the Carabinieri and has its historical roots in the guards of the House of Savoy.

== See also ==
- Companion of the president of the Italian Republic
- Italian presidential elections
- Presidential standard of Italy
- Semestre bianco
