= Modern republicanism =

Political ideology

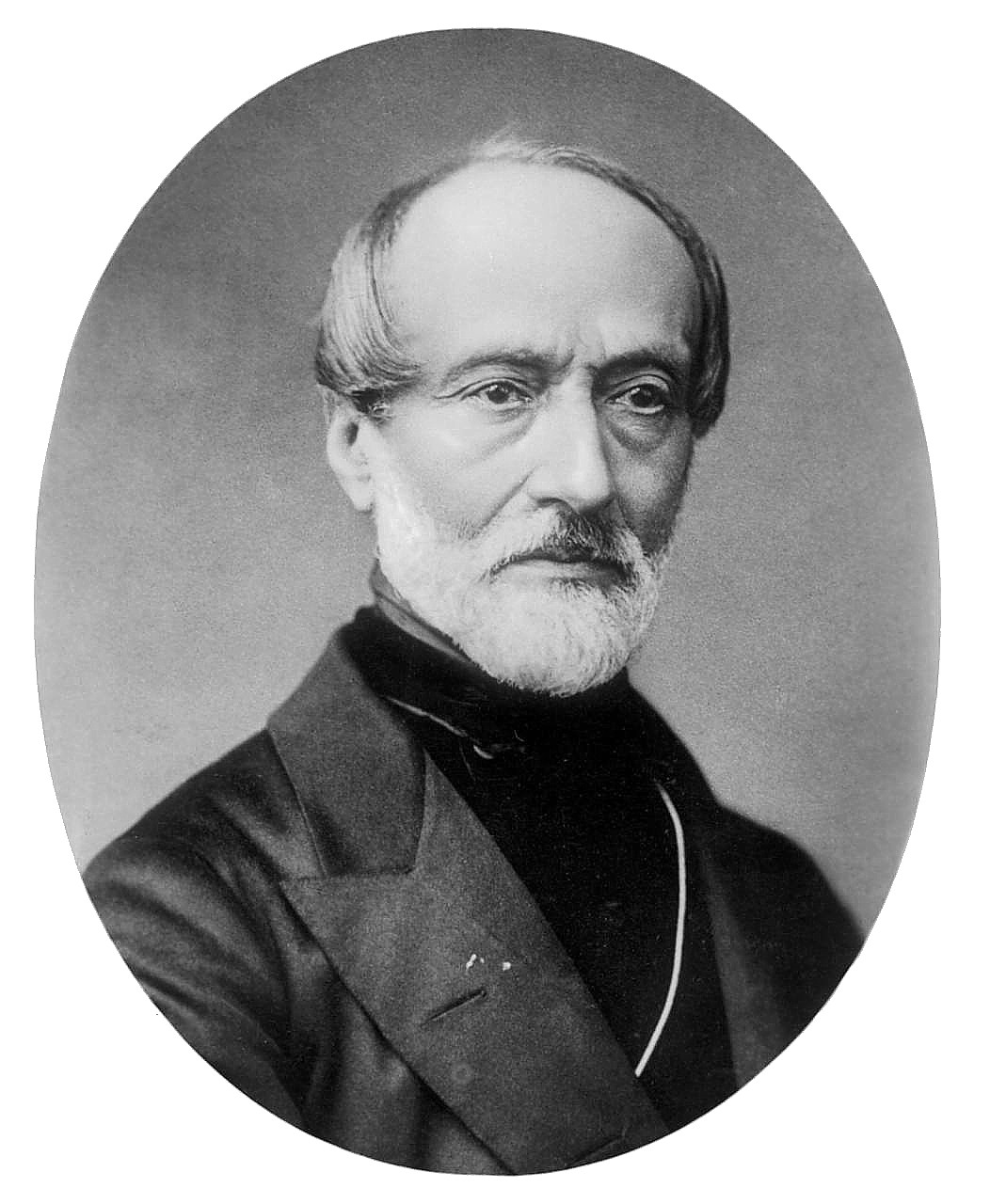
Giuseppe Mazzini, whose thoughts influenced many politicians of a later period, among them Woodrow Wilson, David Lloyd George, Mahatma Gandhi, Golda Meir, and Jawaharlal Nehru.

Modern republicanism is a contemporary political ideology centered on citizenship in a state organized as a modern republic. During the Age of Enlightenment, anti-monarchism extended beyond the civic humanism of the Renaissance. Classical republicanism, still supported by philosophers such as Rousseau and Montesquieu, was only one of several theories seeking to limit the power of monarchies rather than directly opposing them. Liberalism and socialism departed from classical republicanism and fueled the development of the more modern republicanism.

== By region and states ==
=== Hispanic America ===
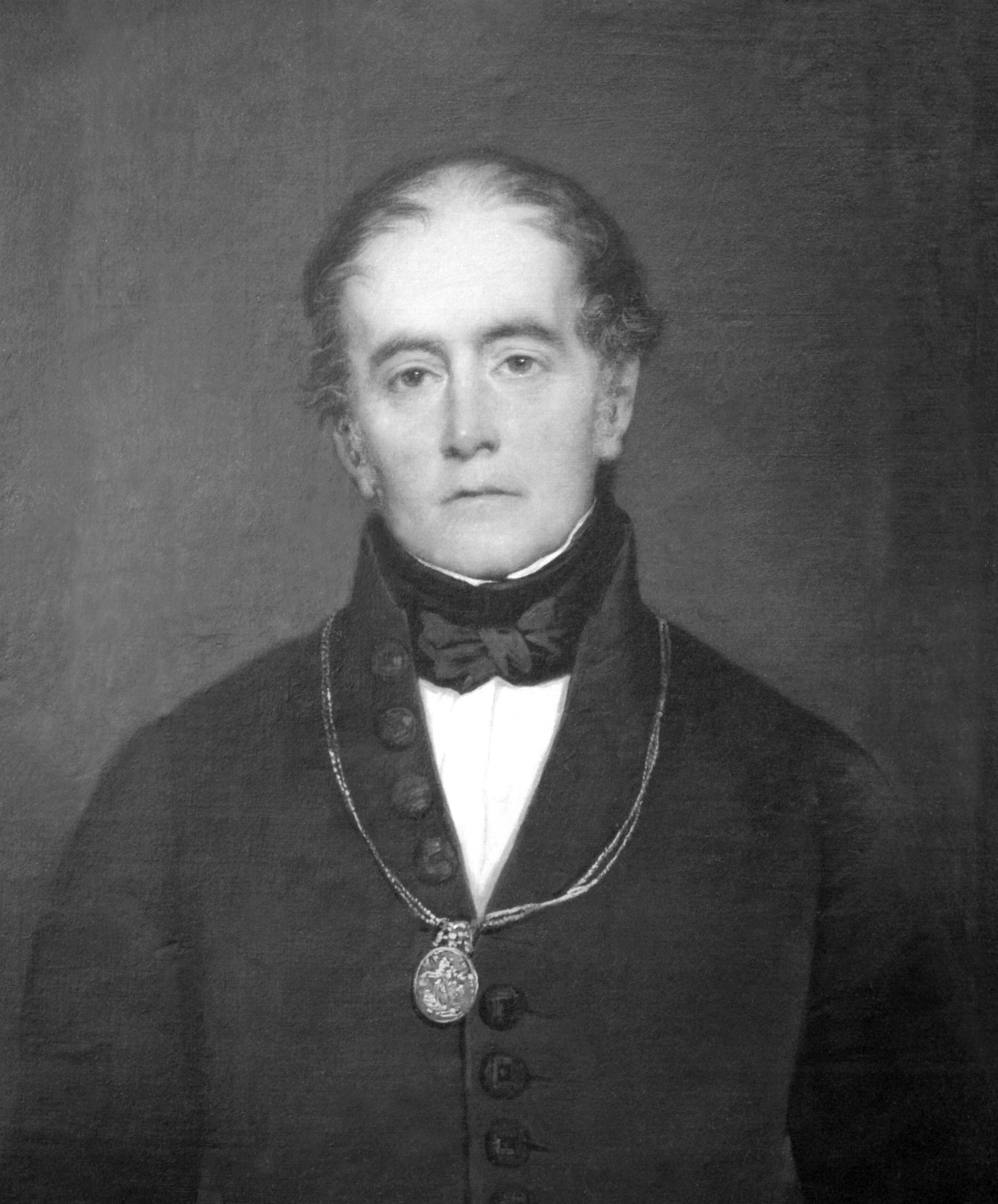
Andrés Bello

Republicanism helped inspire movements for independence in former Spanish colonies in the Americas in the early 19th century, and republican ideals and political designs were influential in the new Spanish American republics. Hispanic American republicans drew inspiration from classic and enlightenment traditions, as well as from developments in France and the United States. The role of republicanism in Spanish-speaking Latin America has attracted renewed interest from scholars. During the middle of the 19th century, many Spanish Americans saw their experiments in republicanism as placing the region on the "vanguard" of political developments, according to historian James Sanders.

Many key political figures in the region identified as republicans, including Simón Bolívar, José María Samper, Francisco Bilbao, and Juan Egaña. Several of these figures produced essays, pamphlets, and collections of speeches that drew upon and adapted the broader tradition of republican political thought. Republicanism informed the development of key political institutions in the region, including ideals of citizenship and the creation of civilian militias. Republicanism often enjoyed broad public support. Shared republicanism also shaped the region's diplomatic traditions, especially the focus on regional confederation, international law, sovereign equality, and ideals of an inclusive international society. Diplomats and international jurists in Latin America, such as Andrés Bello, shaped a tradition of "republican internationalism" that connected domestic republican ideals and practices with the region's emerging place in international society.

=== Brazil ===
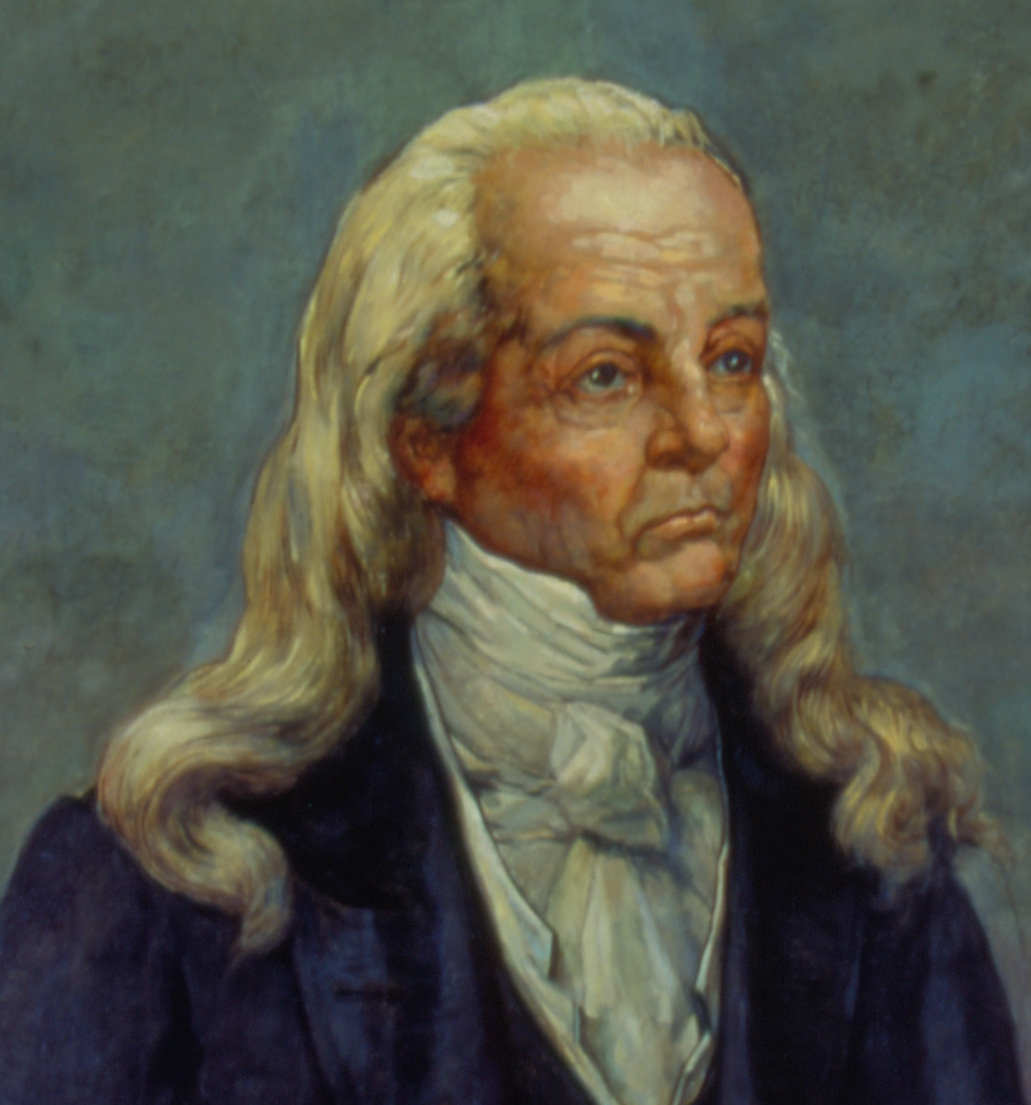
Cipriano Barata

Brazilian historiography generally identifies republican thought with the movement that was formally organized in the Empire of Brazil during the 1870s to 1880s, but republicanism was already present in the country since the First Reign (1822–1831) and the regency period (1831–1840). During Brazil's early years after its independence, the country saw the emergence of a republican discourse among the writings of figures such as Cipriano Barata, Frei Caneca, and João Soares Lisboa; republican ideology better developed as a political current after the emergence of the radical liberal faction in the crisis of the final years of the First Reign.

During the First Reign, three groups emerged on the country's political scene: the moderate liberals, the radical liberals and the caramurus. The moderates defended political-institutional reforms such as decentralization, without, however, giving up the monarchical system. Their main doctrinal references were Locke, Montesquieu, Guizot and Benjamin Constant. The radicals, in turn, formed a heterogeneous group with almost no representation within the imperial bureaucracy. They were on the left of the political spectrum, along Jacobin lines, and defended broad reforms such as the abolition of the monarchy and the establishment of a republic, federalism, the extinction of the Moderating Power, the end of life tenure in the Senate, the separation between Church and State, relative social equality, the extension of political and civil rights to all free segments of society, including women, the staunch opposition to slavery, displaying a nationalist, xenophobic and anti-Portuguese discourse.

In 1870 a group of radical liberals, convinced of the impossibility of achieving their desired reforms within the Brazilian monarchical system, met and founded the Republican Party. From its founding until 1889, the party operated in an erratic and geographically diverse manner. The republican movement was strongest in the Court and in São Paulo, but other smaller foci also emerged in Minas Gerais, Pará, Pernambuco and Rio Grande do Sul. Only in São Paulo, however, did the movement become a true organized and disciplined party capable of electoral competition. Until Brazil's transition from monarchy to republic at the end of the 19th century, the question of form of government often produced disputes in regional diplomacy and in calls for international conferences.

=== United Kingdom ===
Dissatisfaction with British rule led to a longer period of agitation in the early 19th century and failed republican revolutions in Canada in the late 1830s and Ireland in 1848. This led to the Treason Felony Act in 1848 which made it illegal to advocate for republicanism. Another "significant incarnation" of republicanism broke out in the late 19th century when Queen Victoria went into mourning and largely disappeared from public view after the death of her husband, Prince Albert. This led to questions about whether or not the institution should continue, with politicians speaking in support of abolition. This ended when Victoria returned to public duties later in the century and regained significant public support. In the early 21st century, increasing dissatisfaction with the House of Windsor, especially after the death of Elizabeth II in 2022, has led to public support for the monarchy reaching historical lows.

=== British Empire and Commonwealth of Nations ===
A map of the Commonwealth republics

In some countries of the British Empire, later the Commonwealth of Nations, republicanism has taken a variety of forms.

==== Australia ====
In Australia, the debate between republicans and monarchists is still active, and republicanism draws support from across the political spectrum. Former prime minister Malcolm Turnbull was a leading proponent of an Australian republic prior to joining the centre-right Liberal Party, and led the pro-republic campaign during the failed 1999 Australian republic referendum. After becoming prime minister in 2015, he confirmed he still supports a republic, but stated that the issue should wait until after the reign of Queen Elizabeth II. The centre-left Labor Party officially supports the abolition of the monarchy and another referendum on the issue.

==== Barbados ====
In Barbados, the government gave the promise of a referendum on becoming a republic in August 2008, but it was postponed due to the change of government in the 2008 election. A plan to becoming a republic was still in place in September 2020, according to the current PM, with a target date of late 2021.

On 22 March 2015, Prime Minister Freundel Stuart announced that Barbados will move towards a republican form of government "in the very near future". His government was defeated in the next election. In September 2020, the government of Prime Minister Mia Mottley announced that Barbados intended to become a republic by 30 November 2021, the 55th anniversary of its independence. The plan would require a two-thirds majority vote in both houses of Parliament.

On 12 October 2021, incumbent Governor-General of Barbados Dame Sandra Mason was jointly nominated by the prime minister and leader of the opposition as candidate for the first president of Barbados, and was subsequently elected on 20 October. Mason took office on 30 November 2021.

==== Belize ====
The Belize Progressive Party supports republicanism and in the past the Belizean Nationalist Movement did too in the 1930s–1950s.

==== Canada ====
Canadian republicans call for the replacement of the Canadian system of federal constitutional monarchy with a republican form of government. These beliefs are expressed either individually—usually in academic circles—or through the country's one republican lobby group: the Citizens for a Canadian Republic. Debate between monarchists and republicans in Canada has been taking place since before the country's confederation in 1867, though it has rarely been of significance since the rebellions of 1837. Open support for republicanism only came from the Patriotes in the early 19th century, the Red River Métis in 1869, and minor actions by the Fenians throughout the 19th century. However, paralleling the changes in constitutional law that saw the creation of a distinct Canadian monarchy, the emergence in the 1960s of Quebec nationalism, and the evolution of Canadian nationalism, the cultural role and relevance of the monarchy altered and was sometimes questioned in certain circles, while continuing to receive support in others.

==== Gambia ====
The successful 1965 and 1970 Gambian referendums replaced Queen Elizabeth II as the head of state in favour of a republic.

==== Grenada ====
The Grenada United Labour Party advocates Grenada becoming a republic.

==== Ireland ====
Irish republicanism is the political movement for the unity and independence of Ireland under a republic. Irish republicans view British rule in any part of Ireland as inherently illegitimate.

==== Jamaica ====
Andrew Holness, the current Prime Minister of Jamaica, has announced that his government intends to begin the process of transitioning to a republic.

==== New Zealand ====
New Zealand republicanism dates back to the 19th century, although until the late 20th century it was a fringe movement. The current main republican lobby group, New Zealand Republic, was established in 1994. Because New Zealand's constitution is uncodified, a republic could be enacted by statute, as a simple act of parliament. However, it is generally assumed that this would only occur following a nationwide referendum. Several prime ministers and governors-general have identified themselves as republicans, although no government has yet taken any meaningful steps towards enacting a republic. Public opinion polls have generally found that a majority of the population favour retaining the monarchy.

==== Pakistan ====
The Pakistani Republican Party supported the Constitution of Pakistan of 1956. Other republican parties in Pakistan are the Balochistan-based Baloch Republican Party and the Jamhoori Wattan Party. Prominent Pakistani republicans include: Akbar Bugti, Talal Akbar Bugti, Khan Abdul Jabbar Khan, Abdur Rashid Khan, Iskander Mirza, Muzaffar Ali Khan Qizilbash and Feroz Khan Noon.

==== Saint Vincent and the Grenadines ====
In the Saint Vincent and the Grenadines, the failed 2009 Vincentian constitutional referendum was in favour of abolishing the monarchy. Currently republicanism is supported by the Unity Labour Party, including its leader Ralph Gonsalves, the prime minister, the Democratic Republican Party, The SVG Party, United Progressive Party.

==== Tuvalu ====
The 2008 Tuvaluan constitutional referendum had republican options, but came out in favour of keeping the monarchy.

=== Western Europe ===
==== Belgium ====
Republicanism in Belgium can be dated back to the Committee of United Belgians and Liégeois, a political committee in Revolutionary France which brought together leaders of the failed Brabant and Liège Revolutions (1789–1791) who sought to create an independent Belgian republic. They sought to create an independent republic in Belgium. The Republican Socialist Party founded 1887 was republican in nature and based mainly in the Wallonia-Hainaut areas.

The main nationwide movement representing republican interests is Republican Circle; however, republican ideas can be mainly found among proponents of the partition of Belgium into Flanders and Wallonia. Within the Flemish movement, the declaration of independence of the county of Flanders on 4 January 1790, during the Brabantine Revolution was based on republican ideals. The Flemish nationalist-separatist Vlaams Belang support a republic. Within the Walloon Movement, the Rattachist movement is particularly republican, represented by the French National-Collectivist Party, Rassemblement Wallonie France and the regionalist Walloon Rally.

==== France ====
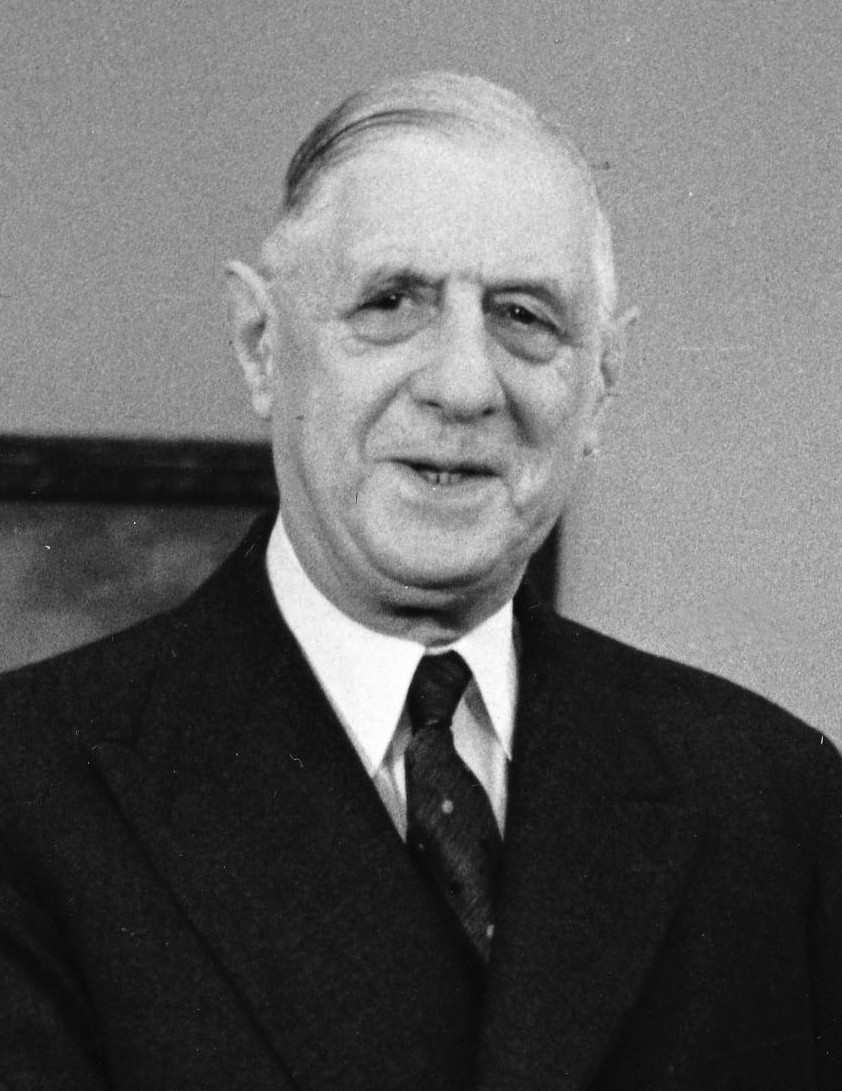
Charles de Gaulle

The French version of republicanism after 1870 was called "Radicalism"; it became the Radical Party, a major political party. In Western Europe, there were similar smaller "radical" parties. They all supported a constitutional republic and universal suffrage, while European liberals were at the time in favor of constitutional monarchy and census suffrage. Most radical parties later favored economic liberalism and capitalism. This distinction between radicalism and liberalism had not totally disappeared in the 20th century, although many radicals simply joined liberal parties. For example, the Radical Party of the Left in France or the (originally Italian) Transnational Radical Party, which still exist, focus more on republicanism than on simple liberalism.

Liberalism was represented in France by the Orleanists who rallied to the Third Republic only in the late 19th century, after the comte de Chambord's 1883 death and the 1891 papal encyclical Rerum novarum. The early Republican, Radical and Radical-Socialist Party in France, and Chartism in Britain, were closer to republicanism. Radicalism remained close to republicanism in the 20th century, at least in France, where they governed several times with other parties (participating in both the Cartel des Gauches coalitions as well as the Popular Front).

Discredited after the Second World War, French radicals split into a left-wing party – the Radical Party of the Left, an associate of the Socialist Party – and the Radical Party "valoisien", an associate party of the conservative Union for a Popular Movement (UMP) and its Gaullist predecessors. Italian radicals also maintained close links with republicanism, as well as with socialism, with the Partito radicale founded in 1955, which became the Transnational Radical Party in 1989.

Increasingly, after the fall of Communism in 1989 and the collapse of the Marxist interpretation of the French Revolution, France increasingly turned to republicanism to define its national identity. Charles de Gaulle, presenting himself as the military savior of France in the 1940s, and the political savior in the 1950s, refashioned the meaning of republicanism. Both left and right enshrined him in the Republican pantheon.

==== Italy ====
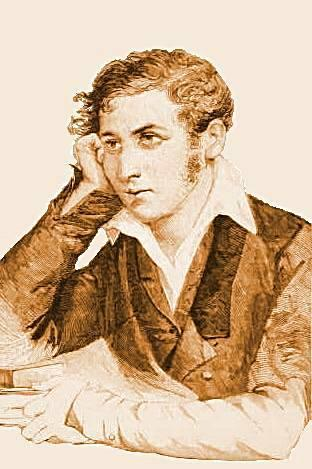
Carlo Cattaneo

In the history of Italy, there are several republican governments that have followed one another over time. Examples are the ancient Roman Republic and the medieval maritime republics. From Cicero to Niccolò Machiavelli, Italian philosophers have imagined the foundations of political science and republicanism. It was Giuseppe Mazzini who revived the republican idea in Italy in the 19th century. An Italian nationalist in the historical radical tradition and a proponent of a republicanism of social-democratic inspiration, Mazzini helped define the modern European movement for popular democracy in a republican state. Mazzini's thoughts had a very considerable influence on the Italian and European republican movements, in the Constitution of Italy, about Europeanism and more nuanced on many politicians of a later period, among them American president Woodrow Wilson, British prime minister David Lloyd George, Mahatma Gandhi, Israeli prime minister Golda Meir and Indian prime minister Jawaharlal Nehru. Mazzini formulated a concept known as "thought and action" in which thought and action must be joined together and every thought must be followed by action, therefore rejecting intellectualism and the notion of divorcing theory from practice.

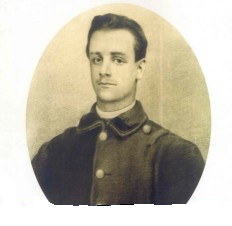
Pietro Barsanti, the first martyr of the modern Italian Republic

In July 1831, in exile in Marseille, Giuseppe Mazzini founded the Young Italy movement, which aimed to transform Italy into a unitary democratic republic, according to the principles of freedom, independence and unity, but also to oust the monarchic regimes pre-existing the unification, including the Kingdom of Sardinia. The foundation of the Young Italy constitutes a key moment of the Italian Risorgimento. The philosopher Carlo Cattaneo promoted a secular and republican Italy in the extension of Mazzini's ideas, but organized as a federal republic. The political projects of Mazzini and Cattaneo were thwarted by the action of the Piedmontese Prime Minister Camillo Benso, Count of Cavour, and Giuseppe Garibaldi. The latter set aside his republican ideas to favor Italian unity. After having obtained the conquest of the whole of southern Italy during the Expedition of the Thousand, Garibaldi handed over the conquered territories to the king of Sardinia Victor Emmanuel II, which were annexed to the Kingdom of Sardinia after a plebiscite. This earned him heavy criticism from numerous republicans who accused him of treason. While a laborious administrative unification began, a first Italian parliament was elected and, on 17 March 1861, Victor Emmanuel II was proclaimed king of Italy.

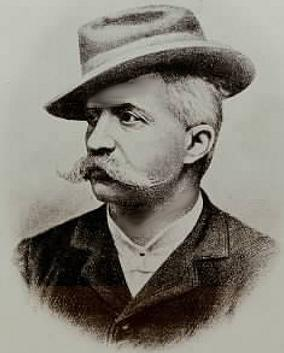
Felice Cavallotti

In the political panorama of the time there was a republican political movement which had its martyrs, such as the soldier Pietro Barsanti. Barsanti was a supporter of republican ideas, and was a soldier in the Royal Italian Army with the rank of corporal. He was sentenced to death and shot in 1870 for having favored an insurrectional attempt against the Savoy monarchy and is therefore considered the first martyr of the modern Italian Republic. and a symbol of republican ideals in Italy. The Republicans took part in the elections to the Italian Parliament, and in 1853 they formed the Action Party around Giuseppe Mazzini. Although in exile, Mazzini was elected in 1866, but refused to take his seat in parliament. Cattaneo was elected deputy in 1860 and 1867, but refused so as not to have to swear loyalty to the House of Savoy. The problem of the oath of loyalty to the monarchy, necessary to be elected, was the subject of controversy within the republican forces. In 1873, Felice Cavallotti, one of the most committed Italian politicians against the monarchy, preceded his oath with a declaration in which he reaffirmed his republican beliefs.

In October 1922, the nomination of Benito Mussolini as prime minister by King Victor Emmanuel III, following the march on Rome, paved the way for the establishment of the dictatorship. With the implementation of fascist laws (Royal Decree of 6 November 1926), all political parties operating on Italian territory were dissolved, with the exception of the National Fascist Party. The Kingdom of Italy entered World War II on 10 June 1940. Hostilities ended on 29 April 1945, when the German forces in Italy surrendered. The aftermath of World War II left Italy also with an anger against the monarchy for its endorsement of the Fascist regime for the previous twenty years. These frustrations contributed to a revival of the Italian republican movement. Italy became a republic after the 1946 Italian institutional referendum held on 2 June, a day celebrated since as Festa della Repubblica. It was the first time that the whole Italian Peninsula was under a form of republican governance since the end of the ancient Roman Republic.

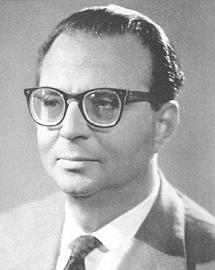
Ugo La Malfa

The Italian Republican Party (Italian: Partito Repubblicano Italiano, PRI) is a political party in Italy established in 1895, which makes it the oldest political party still active in the country. The Italian Republican Party identifies with 19th-century classical radicalism, as well as Mazzinianism, and its modern incarnation is associated with liberalism, social liberalism, and centrism. The Italian Republican Party has old roots and a long history that began with a left-wing position, being the heir of the Historical Far Left and claiming descent from the political thought of Giuseppe Mazzini and Giuseppe Garibaldi. With the rise of the Italian Communist Party and the Italian Socialist Party (PSI) to its left, it was associated with centre-left politics. The early Italian Republican Party was also known for its anti-clerical, anti-monarchist, republican, and later anti-fascist stances. While maintaining those traits, during the second half of the 20th century the party moved towards the centre on the left–right political spectrum, becoming increasingly economically liberal.

After 1949, the Italian Republican Party was a member of the pro-NATO alliance formed by Christian Democracy (DC), the Italian Democratic Socialist Party, and the Italian Liberal Party (PLI), enabling it to participate in most governments of the 1950s, a period later known as Centrism. In 1963, the party helped bring together DC and PSI in Italy's first centre-left government, the Organic centre-left. Although small in terms of voter support, the Italian Republican Party was influential thanks to leaders like Eugenio Chiesa, Giovanni Conti, Cipriano Facchinetti, Randolfo Pacciardi, Oronzo Reale, Ugo La Malfa, Bruno Visentini, Oddo Biasini and Giovanni Spadolini. The latter served as Prime Minister of Italy in 1981–1982, the first non Christian Democrat since 1945. From 1976 to 2010, the Italian Republican Party was a member of the European Liberal Democrat and Reform Party (ELDR), along with the PLI, and the two parties usually ran together in European Parliament elections. After joining the centrist Segni Pact in 1994, the Italian Republican Party was part of the centre-left coalition from 1996 to 2006, and then of the centre-right coalition from 2008 to 2013 (its leader Giorgio La Malfa was minister in 2005–2006). Afterwards, it ran alone until joining the centrist Action – Italia Viva in 2022.

==== Luxembourg ====
In the 1919 Luxembourg referendum a republic form of statehood was overwhelmingly rejected.

==== The Netherlands ====
The Netherlands have known two republican periods: the Dutch Republic (1581–1795) that gained independence from the Spanish Empire during the Eighty Years' War, followed by the Batavian Republic (1795–1806) that after conquest by the French First Republic had been established as a Sister Republic. After Napoleon crowned himself Emperor of the French, he made his brother Louis Bonaparte King of Holland (1806–1810), then annexed the Netherlands into the French First Empire (1810–1813) until he was defeated at the Battle of Leipzig. Thereafter the Sovereign Principality of the United Netherlands (1813–1815) was established, granting the Orange-Nassau family, who during the Dutch Republic had only been stadtholders, a princely title over the Netherlands, and soon William Frederick even crowned himself King of the Netherlands. His rather autocratic tendencies in spite of the principles of constitutional monarchy met increasing resistance from Parliament and the population, which eventually limited the monarchy's power and democratised the government, most notably through the Constitutional Reform of 1848. Since the late 19th century, republicanism has had various degrees of support in society, which the royal house generally dealt with by gradually letting go of its formal influence in politics and taking on a more ceremonial and symbolic role. Nowadays, popularity of the monarchy is high, but there is a significant republican minority that strives to abolish the monarchy altogether.

==== Spain ====
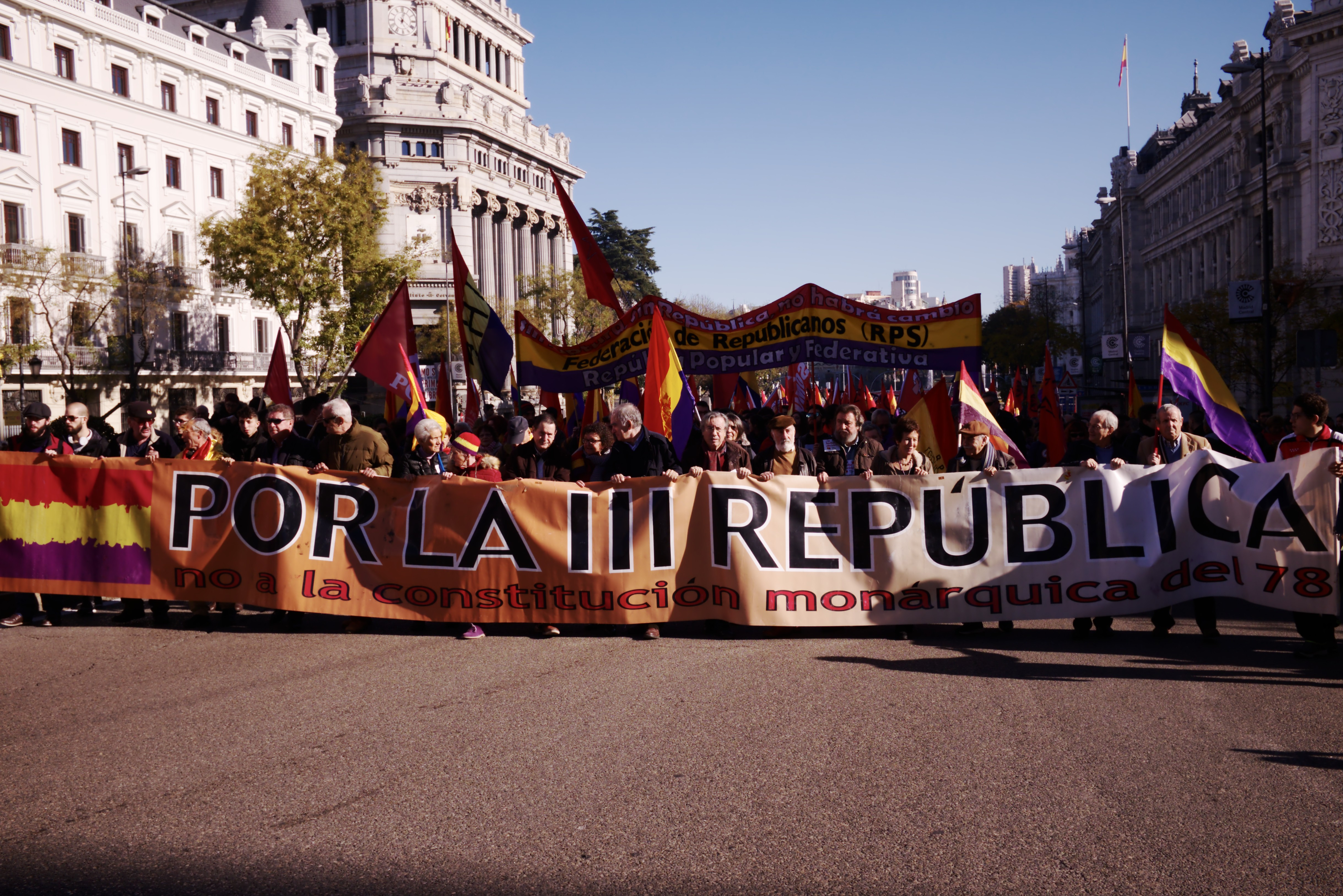
2018 demonstration in Madrid calling for the Third Spanish Republic

There has existed in Spain a persistent trend of republican thought, especially throughout the 19th, 20th, and 21st centuries, that has manifested itself in diverse political parties and movements over the entire course of the history of Spain. While these movements have shared the objective of establishing a republic, during these three centuries there have surged distinct schools of thought on the form republicans would want to give to the Spanish State: unitary or federal. The roots of Spanish republicanism arose out of liberal thought in the wake of the French Revolution. The first manifestations of republicanism occurred during the Peninsular War, in which Spain and nearby regions fought for independence from Napoleon, 1808–1814. During the reign of Ferdinand VII (1813–1833) there were several liberalist military pronunciamientos, but it was not until the reign of Isabella II (1833–1868) that the first clearly republican and anti-monarchist movements appeared.

There is a renewed interest in republicanism in Spain after two earlier attempts: the First Spanish Republic (1873–1874) and the Second Spanish Republic (1931–1939). Movements such as Ciudadanos Por la República, Citizens for the Republic in Spanish, have emerged, and parties like United Left and the Republican Left of Catalonia increasingly refer to republicanism. In a survey conducted in 2007 reported that 69% of the population prefer the monarchy to continue, compared with 22% opting for a republic. In a 2008 survey, 58% of Spanish citizens were indifferent, 16% favored a republic, 16% were monarchists, and 7% claimed they were Juancarlistas (supporters of continued monarchy under King Juan Carlos I, without a common position for the fate of the monarchy after his death). In recent years, there has been a tie between Monarchists and Republicans.

=== Scandinavia ===
==== Faroe Islands ====
The Faroese independence movement has a strong republican element, most notably represented by the Republic Party.

==== Iceland ====
The overwhelmingly passed 1944 Icelandic constitutional referendum effectively abolished the monarchy in favour of a republic. The 1 December 1918 Danish–Icelandic Act of Union had granted Iceland independence from Denmark, but maintained the two countries in a personal union, with the King of Denmark also being the King of Iceland. In the two-part referendum, voters were asked whether the Union with Denmark should be abolished, and whether to adopt a new republican constitution. Both measures were approved, each with more than 98% in favour. Voter turnout was 98.4% overall, and 100% in two constituencies, Seyðisfirði and Vestur-Skaftafjellssýsla.

==== Norway ====
In the period around and after the dissolution of the union between Norway and Sweden in 1905, an opposition to the monarchy grew in Norway, and republican movements and thoughts continue to exist to this day. Currently, the Norwegian Republican Association (Norge som republikk) is the only non-partisan organisation campaigning to abolish the monarchy and make Norway a republic. In 2024, the crown prince’s stepson, Marius Borg Høiby was arrested on suspicion of rape and is facing trial. From 20 November 2024, Høiby was a remand prisoner at Hamar Prison. As of 21 November Høiby is accused of raping three women. The Høiby affair, along with scandals involving the King's son-in-law, conspiracy theorist, convicted felon and accused sex offender Durek Verrett, have been cited as reasons for a "decimation of the Norwegian royal family's reputation," leading to debate about democratic constitutional reforms to abolish hereditary positions and a doubling of membership in the Norwegian republican association.

==== Sweden ====
In Sweden, a major promoter of republicanism is the Swedish Republican Association, which advocates for a democratic ending to the Monarchy of Sweden. A large part of the arguments for proclaiming a Swedish Republic are based on an ideological rejection of the monarchy, not necessarily on rejecting the individuals who actually exercise kingship. The effort towards a republic has been included in the early party platforms of the Social Democratic Party, the Left Party and the Green Party. The Social Democratic Party had stated its intention to establish a republic in its party platform ever since its foundation in 1889. However, when it came into power in 1920, the desire had worn off. This is attributed to the pragmatism of its then leader Hjalmar Branting. In 1997, the Swedish Republican Association was founded. In 2010, the umbrella Alliance of European Republican Movements (AERM) was founded in Stockholm, in which Swedish republicans cooperate with other European republican groups.

=== Japan ===
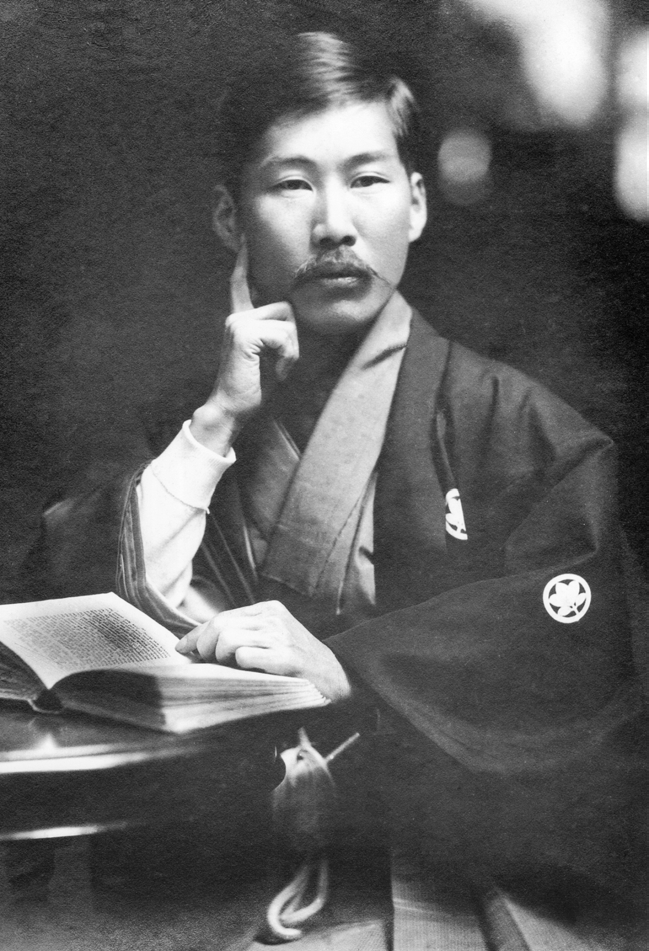
Kōtoku Shūsui

Anti-monarchism in Japan was a minor force during the 20th century. The Japanese Communist Party is the most prominent advocate of a non-monarchic system and has in the past demanded the abolition of the emperor system outright. In 1908, a letter allegedly written by Japanese revolutionaries denied the Emperor's divinity, and threatened his life. In 1910, Kōtoku Shūsui and 10 others plotted to assassinate the Emperor. In 1923, 1925 and 1932 Emperor Hirohito survived assassination attempts.

After World War II, the communists were antagonistic to the Emperor. The Japanese Communist Party demanded the abolition of the emperor system. They boycotted the formal opening of the National Diet in 1949 because of Emperor Shōwa's presence. The Japanese Communist Party continued to be antagonistic after Emperor Shōwa's death in 1989. During the Imperial visits to Otsu, Japan in 1951, and Hokkaido in 1954, Communist posters and handbills antagonistic to the Imperial Family Members were plastered in the cities. In 1951, three thousand students in Kyoto University protested against Emperor Shōwa's continued reign.

=== Turkey ===
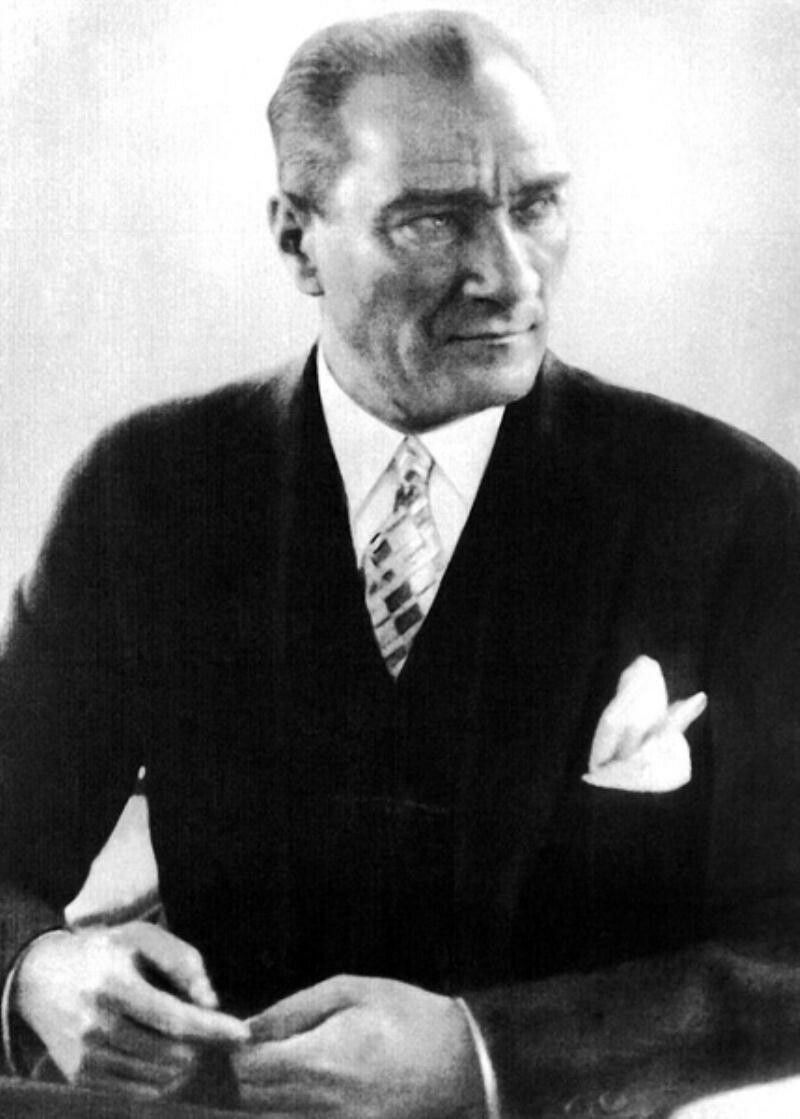
Mustafa Kemal Atatürk

In 1923 after the fall of the Ottoman Empire an inherited aristocracy and sultanate suppressed republican ideas until the successful republican revolution of Mustafa Kemal Atatürk in the 1920s. Republicanism remains one of the six principles of Kemalism. Kemalism, as it was implemented by Mustafa Kemal Atatürk after the declaration of Republic in 1923, was defined by sweeping political, social, cultural and religious reforms designed to separate the new Turkish state from its Ottoman predecessor and embrace a Western-style modernized lifestyle, including the establishment of secularism/laicism, state support of the sciences, free education, gender equality, economic statism and many more. Most of those policies were first introduced to and implemented in Turkey during Atatürk's presidency through his reforms.

Many of the root ideas of Kemalism began during the late Ottoman Empire under various reforms to avoid the imminent collapse of the Empire, beginning chiefly in the early 19th-century Tanzimat reforms. The mid-century Young Ottomans attempted to create the ideology of Ottoman nationalism, or Ottomanism, to quell the rising ethnic nationalism in the Empire and introduce limited democracy for the first time while maintaining Islamist influences. In the early 20th century, the Young Turks abandoned Ottoman nationalism in favor of early Turkish nationalism, while adopting a secular political outlook. After the demise of the Ottoman Empire, Atatürk, influenced by both the Young Ottomans and the Young Turks, as well as by their successes and failures, led the declaration of the Republic of Turkey in 1923, borrowing from the earlier movements' ideas of secularism and Turkish nationalism, while implementing free education and other reforms that have been enshrined by later leaders into guidelines for governing Turkey.

=== United States ===
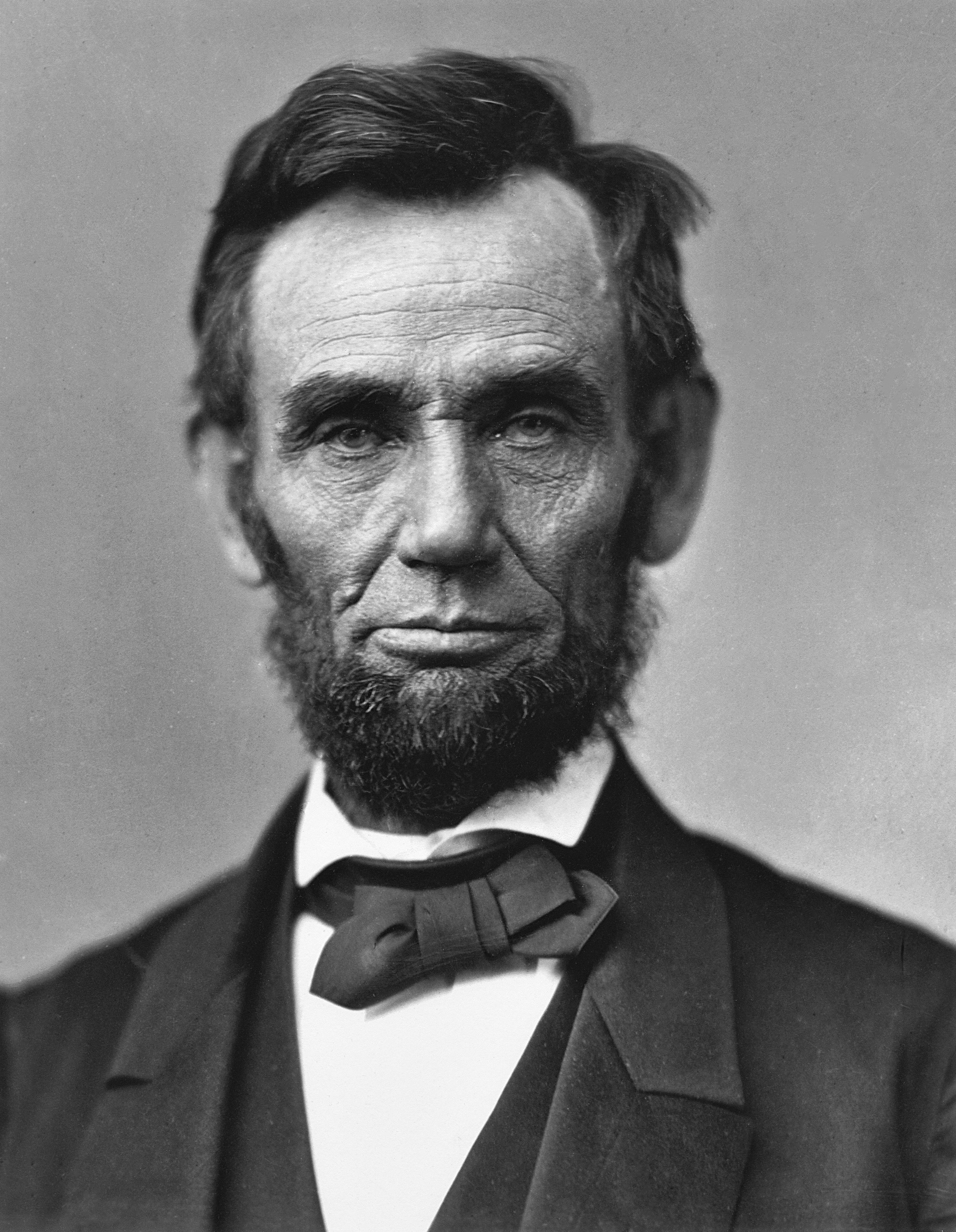
Abraham Lincoln

The values and ideals of republicanism are foundational in the constitution and history of the United States. As the United States constitution prohibits granting titles of nobility, republicanism in this context does not refer to a political movement to abolish such a social class, as it does in countries such as the UK, Australia, and the Netherlands. Instead, it refers to the core values that citizenry in a republic have, or ought to have. Political scientists and historians have described these central values as liberty and inalienable individual rights; recognizing the sovereignty of the people as the source of all authority in law; rejecting monarchy, aristocracy, and hereditary political power; virtue and faithfulness in the performance of civic duties; and vilification of corruption. These values are based on those of Ancient Greco-Roman, Renaissance, and English models and ideas.

Republicanism became the dominant political value of Americans during and after the American Revolution. The Founding Fathers were strong advocates of republican values, especially Thomas Jefferson, Samuel Adams, Patrick Henry, Thomas Paine, Benjamin Franklin, John Adams, James Madison and Alexander Hamilton. In 1854, social movements started to harness values of abolitionism and free labour. These burgeoning radical traditions in America became epitomized in the early formation of the Republican Party, known as "red republicanism". The efforts were primarily led by political leaders such as Alvan E. Bovay, Thaddeus Stevens, and Abraham Lincoln.

== See also ==
- Abolition of monarchy
- Criticism of monarchy

== Sources ==
- Quentin-Baxter, Alison; McLean, Janet (2017). This Realm of New Zealand: The Sovereign, the Governor-General, the Crown. Auckland University Press. ISBN 978-1-869-40875-6.
