= 1946 Italian institutional referendum =

Italian referendum on their monarchy

- 2 June 1946
- Republic or Monarchy?
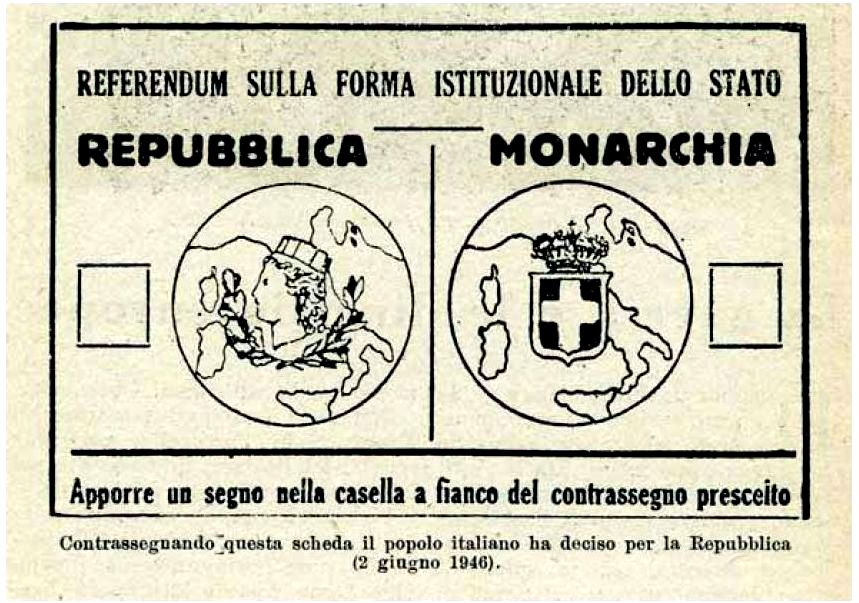
- Ballot used in the referendum
- Outcome: Birth of the Italian Republic

Results
Choice	Votes	%
Republic	12,718,641	54.27%
Monarchy	10,718,502	45.73%
Valid votes	23,437,143	93.95%
Invalid or blank votes	1,509,735	6.05%
Total votes	24,946,878	100.00%
Registered voters/turnout	28,005,449	89.08%
- Results by municipality and province Republic Monarchy

An institutional referendum (Italian: referendum istituzionale, or referendum sulla forma istituzionale dello Stato) was held by universal suffrage in the Kingdom of Italy on 2 June 1946, a key event of contemporary Italian history. Until 1946, Italy was a kingdom ruled by the House of Savoy, reigning since the unification of Italy in 1861 and previously rulers of the Kingdom of Sardinia. In 1922, the rise of Benito Mussolini and the creation of the Fascist regime in Italy, which eventually resulted in engaging the country in World War II alongside Nazi Germany, considerably weakened the role of the royal house.

Following the Italian Civil War and the Liberation of Italy from Axis troops in 1945, a popular referendum on the institutional form of the state was called the next year and resulted in voters choosing the replacement of the monarchy with a republic. The 1946 Italian general election to elect the Constituent Assembly of Italy was held on the same day. As with the simultaneous Constituent Assembly elections, the referendum was not held in the Julian March, in the province of Zara or the province of Bolzano, which were still under occupation by Allied forces pending a final settlement of the status of the territories.

The results were proclaimed by the Supreme Court of Cassation on 10 June 1946: 12,717,923 citizens in favor of the republic and 10,719,284 citizens in favor of the monarchy. The event is commemorated annually by the Festa della Repubblica. The former King Umberto II voluntarily left the country on 13 June 1946, headed for Cascais, in southern Portugal, without even waiting for the results to be defined and the ruling on the appeals presented by the monarchist party, which were rejected by the Supreme Court of Cassation on 18 June 1946. With the entry into force of the new Constitution of the Italian Republic, on 1 January 1948, Enrico De Nicola became the first to assume the functions of president of Italy. It marked the first time that the Italian Peninsula was under a single republican government since the fall of the Roman Republic.

== Background ==
=== Republican ideas and the unification of Italy ===
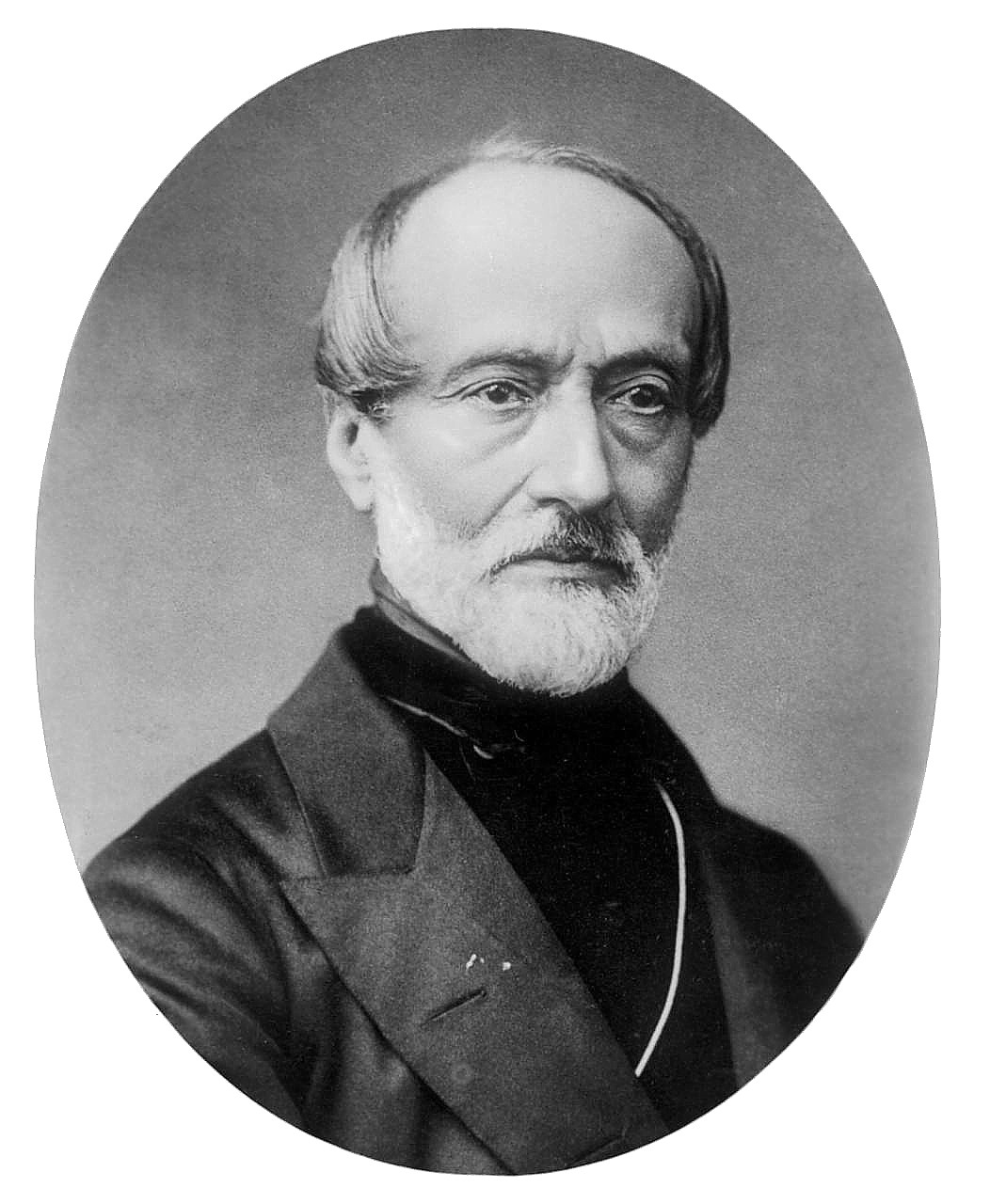
Giuseppe Mazzini. His thoughts influenced many politicians of a later period, among them Woodrow Wilson, David Lloyd George, Mahatma Gandhi, Golda Meir and Jawaharlal Nehru.

In the history of Italy there are several so-called "republican" governments that have followed one another over time. Examples are the ancient Roman Republic and the medieval maritime republics. From Cicero to Niccolò Machiavelli, Italian philosophers have imagined the foundations of political science and republicanism. (Note: Jean-Jacques Rousseau notes, in The Social Contract, about Niccolò Machiavelli and his work The Prince: "Pretending to give lessons to kings, he gave great lessons to the people. The Prince is the book of the republicans." — see Rousseau – Du Contrat social éd. Beaulavon 1903.djvu/237 – Wikisource.) It was Giuseppe Mazzini who revived the republican idea in Italy in the 19th century.

An Italian nationalist in the historical radical tradition and a proponent of a republicanism of social-democratic inspiration, Mazzini helped define the modern European movement for popular democracy in a republican state. Mazzini's thoughts had a very considerable influence on the Italian and European republican movements, in the Constitution of Italy, about Europeanism and more nuanced on many politicians of a later period, among them American president Woodrow Wilson, British prime minister David Lloyd George, Mahatma Gandhi, Israeli prime minister Golda Meir and Indian prime minister Jawaharlal Nehru. Mazzini formulated a concept known as "thought and action" in which thought and action must be joined and every thought must be followed by action, therefore rejecting intellectualism and the notion of divorcing theory from practice.

In July 1831, in exile in Marseille, Giuseppe Mazzini founded the Young Italy movement, which aimed to transform Italy into a unitary democratic republic, according to the principles of freedom, independence and unity, but also to oust the monarchic regimes pre-existing the unification, including the Kingdom of Sardinia. The foundation of the Young Italy constitutes a key moment of the Italian Risorgimento and this republican program precedes in time the proposals for the unification of Italy of Vincenzo Gioberti and Cesare Balbo, aimed at reunifying the Italian territory under the presidency of the Pope. Subsequently, the philosopher Carlo Cattaneo promoted a secular and republican Italy in the extension of Mazzini's ideas, but organized as a federal republic.

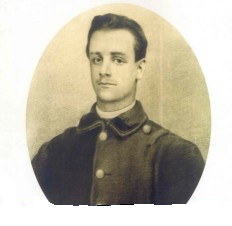
Pietro Barsanti, the first martyr of the modern Italian Republic

The political projects of Mazzini and Cattaneo were thwarted by the action of the Piedmontese Prime Minister Camillo Benso, Count of Cavour, and Giuseppe Garibaldi. The latter set aside his republican ideas to favor Italian unity. After having obtained the conquest of the whole of southern Italy during the Expedition of the Thousand, Garibaldi handed over the conquered territories to the king of Sardinia Victor Emmanuel II, which were annexed to the Kingdom of Sardinia after a plebiscite. This earned him heavy criticism from numerous republicans who accused him of treason. While a laborious administrative unification began, a first Italian parliament was elected and, on 17 March 1861, Victor Emmanuel II was proclaimed king of Italy.

From 1861 to 1946, Italy was a constitutional monarchy founded on the Albertine Statute, named after the king who promulgated it in 1848, Charles Albert of Sardinia. The parliament included a Senate, whose members were appointed by the king, and a Chamber of Deputies, elected by census vote. In 1861 only 2% of Italians had the right to vote. In the political panorama of the time there was a republican political movement which had its martyrs, such as the soldier Pietro Barsanti. Barsanti was a supporter of republican ideas, and was a soldier in the Royal Italian Army with the rank of corporal. He was sentenced to death and shot in 1870 for having favored an insurrectional attempt against the Savoy monarchy and is therefore considered the first martyr of the modern Italian Republic and a symbol of republican ideals in Italy.

=== Albertine Statute and liberal Italy ===
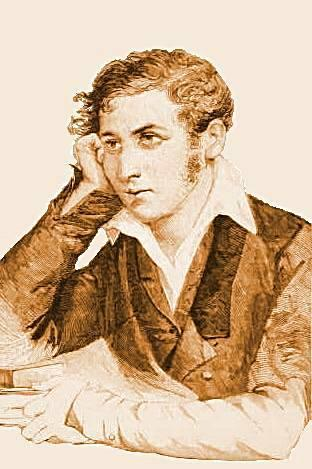
Carlo Cattaneo

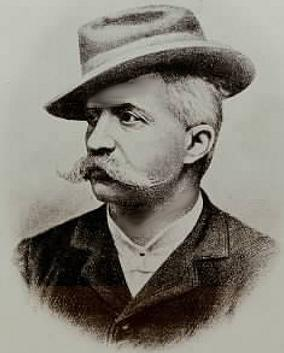
Felice Cavallotti

The balance of power between the Chamber and Senate initially shifted in favor of the Senate, composed mainly of nobles and industrial figures. Little by little, the Chamber of Deputies took on more and more importance with the evolution of the bourgeoisie and the large landowners, concerned with economic progress, but supporters of order and a certain social conservatism.

The Republicans took part in the elections to the Italian Parliament, and in 1853 they formed the Action Party around Giuseppe Mazzini. Although in exile, Mazzini was elected in 1866, but refused to take his seat in parliament. Carlo Cattaneo was elected deputy in 1860 and 1867, but refused so as not to have to swear loyalty to the House of Savoy. The problem of the oath of loyalty to the monarchy, necessary to be elected, was the subject of controversy within the republican forces. In 1873 Felice Cavallotti, one of the most committed Italian politicians against the monarchy, preceded his oath with a declaration in which he reaffirmed his republican beliefs. In 1882, a new electoral law lowered the census limit for voting rights, increasing the number of voters to over two million, equal to 7% of the population. In the same year the Italian Workers' Party was created, which in 1895 became the Italian Socialist Party. In 1895 the intransigent republicans agreed to participate in the political life of the Kingdom, establishing the Italian Republican Party. Two years later, the far left reached its historical maximum level in Parliament with 81 deputies, for the three radical-democratic, socialist components and Republican. With the death of Felice Cavallotti in 1898, the radical left gave up on posing the institutional problem.

In Italian politics, the socialist party progressively divided into two tendencies: a maximalist one, led among others by Arturo Labriola and Enrico Ferri, and supporting the use of strikes; the other, reformist and pro-government, was led by Filippo Turati. A nationalist movement emerged, led in particular by Enrico Corradini, as well as a Catholic social and democratic movement, the National Democratic League, led by Romolo Murri. In 1904, Pope Pius X authorized Catholics to participate individually in political life, but in 1909 he condemned the National Democratic League created by Romolo Murri, who was excommunicated. Finally, a law of 3 June 1912 marked Italy's evolution towards a certain political liberalism by establishing universal male suffrage. In 1914, at the outbreak of World War I, Italy began to be counted among the world's liberal democracies.

=== Fascism ===
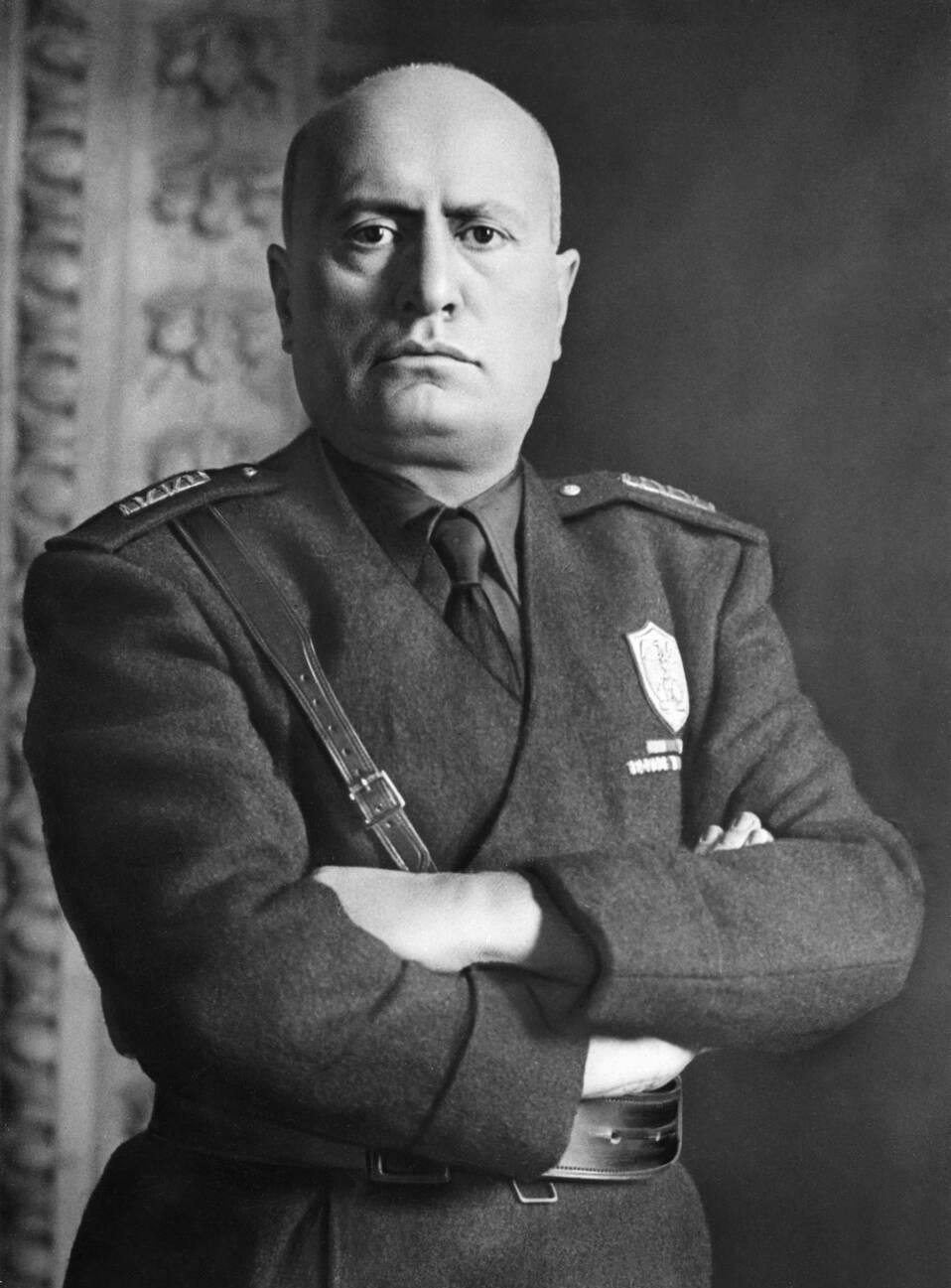
Benito Mussolini titled himself Duce and ruled the country from 1922 to 1943

After World War I, Italian political life was animated by four great movements. Two of these movements were in favor of democratic development within the framework of existing monarchical institutions: the reformist socialists and the Italian People's Party. Two other movements challenged these institutions: the Republican Party on the one hand, and the maximalist socialists. In the 1919 elections, the parties most imbued with republican ideology (the maximalist socialists and the Republican Party) won, obtaining 165 out of 508 seats in the Chamber of Deputies. In the 1921 elections, after the foundation of the Italian Communist Party, the three parties republican, maximalist socialist and communist obtained 145 deputies out of 535. Overall, at the beginning of the interwar period, less than 30% of those elected were in favor of the establishment of a republican regime. In this context, the rise of Benito Mussolini's fascist movement was based on the bitterness generated by the "mutilated victory", the fear of social unrest and the rejection of revolutionary, republican and Marxist ideology. The liberal political system and part of the aristocracy chose to erect fascism as a bulwark against, in their way of seeing, these dangers.

In October 1922, the nomination of Benito Mussolini as prime minister by King Victor Emmanuel III, following the march on Rome, paved the way for the establishment of the dictatorship. The Albertine Statute was progressively emptied of its content. Parliament was subject to the will of the new government. (Note: The Chamber of Deputies was replaced in 1939 by Chamber of Fasces and Corporations.) The legal opposition disintegrated. On 27 June 1924, 127 deputies left Parliament and retreated to the Aventine Hill, a clumsy maneuver which, in effect, left the field open to the fascists. They then had the fate of Italy in their hands for two decades.

Not only did Victor Emmanuel III appeal to Mussolini to form the government in 1922 and allow him to proceed with the domestication of Parliament, but he did not even draw the consequences of the assassination of Giacomo Matteotti in 1924. He accepted the title of emperor in 1936 at the end of Second Italo-Ethiopian War, then the alliance with Nazi Germany and Italy's entry into World War II on 10 June 1940.

=== Anti-fascist parties in Italy and abroad ===
Flag of Arditi del Popolo, an axe cutting a fasces. Arditi del Popolo was a militant anti-fascist group founded in 1921.

With the implementation of fascist laws (Royal Decree of 6 November 1926), all political parties operating on Italian territory were dissolved, with the exception of the National Fascist Party. Some of these parties expatriated and reconstituted themselves abroad, especially in France. Thus an anti-fascist coalition was formed on 29 March 1927 in Paris, the "Concentrazione Antifascista Italiana", which brought together the Italian Republican Party, the Italian Socialist Party, the Socialist Unitary Party of Italian Workers, the Italian League for Human Rights and the foreign representation of the Italian General Confederation of Labour. Some movements remained outside, including the Italian Communist Party, the popular Catholic movement and other liberal movements. This coalition dissolved on 5 May 1934 and, in August of the same year, the pact of unity of action was signed between the Italian Socialist Party and the Italian Communist Party.

In the meantime, in Italy, clandestine anti-fascist nuclei were formed, in particular in Milan with Ferruccio Parri and in Florence with Riccardo Bauer. Under the impetus of these groups, the Action Party, Mazzini's former republican party, was re-established. (Note: The Action Party, reformed in 1942, constituted in 1944–1945 the second force within the National Liberation Committee. The political party with the largest number of partisan groups is then the Italian Communist Party.) Between the end of 1942 and the beginning of 1943, Alcide De Gasperi wrote The reconstructive ideas of Christian Democracy, which laid the foundations of the new Catholic-inspired party, the Christian Democracy. It brought together the veterans of Luigi Sturzo's Italian People's Party and the young people of Catholic associations, in particular of the University Federation.

=== Institutional crisis ===
On 10 July 1943, the Allies landed in Sicily in Operation Husky. On 25 July 1943, Victor Emmanuel III revoked Mussolini's mandate as prime minister and had him arrested, entrusting the government to Marshal Pietro Badoglio. The new government contacted the Allies to reach an armistice. When the Armistice of Cassibile was announced on 8 September 1943, the Germans reacted by placing under their control all the part of Italian territory that still escaped the Allied advance and by disarming the Italian Royal Army. Victor Emmanuel III and Badoglio's government fled Rome and reached Brindisi, in southern Italy. The war continued, but was also accompanied by the Italian Civil War, with the creation by Mussolini of the Italian Social Republic, heavily dependent on the Germans, and by the division of Italy into two antagonistic territories, one occupied by the allied forces, the other occupied by Nazi Germany. In these dramatic circumstances, in the two territories the civil administration gave way to a military and police administration. However, the parties that existed before fascism were reconstituted, alongside new political parties.

Flag of the National Liberation Committee

On 9 September 1943, in Rome (still occupied by the Germans), a National Liberation Committee (CLN) was created, which brought together the parties and movements opposed to fascism and German occupation. It was made up of representatives of the Italian Communist Party, members of the Action Party, Christian Democrats, liberals, socialists and progressive democrats. The National Liberation Committee gave priority to the fight against the Nazi-fascists, postponing the question of the institutional form of the Italian state until after the victory, but made the abdication of the king in favor of his son a prerequisite for the establishment of an anti-fascist government. The patriotic war of liberation led by the National Liberation Committee was also, for a significant part of its supporters, a war of social liberation, a war against a collaborationist elite. However, the Americans and English, anxious to prepare for the post-war period, facilitated the entry into German-occupied territory of Italian democratic and republican activists aimed at counterbalancing the communist influence in the leadership of the National Liberation Committee. This was the case, for example, of Leo Valiani, future member of the triumvirate responsible for the partisan insurrection in Piedmont and Lombardy.

=== Institutional truce ===
King Victor Emmanuel III of Italy

On 31 March 1944, in Salerno, Palmiro Togliatti, general secretary of the Italian Communist Party, called for the formation of a government of national unity and no longer required the king's abdication as a prerequisite. This declaration pushed the parties of the National Liberation Committee to rally around a compromise drawn up by Enrico De Nicola, president of the Chamber of Deputies until 1924, by Benedetto Croce of the liberal party and by the king's entourage. As foreseen in this agreement, upon the liberation of Rome, on 4 June 1944, Victor Emmanuel III proclaimed his son Umberto lieutenant general of the kingdom, and the parties took political control of the nation, even if the war continued, stabilizing on the front on the Gothic line until April 1945.

From June 1944 to December 1945, three provisional coalition governments followed one another. The first was led by Ivanoe Bonomi, of the Labour Democratic Party. His government included the anti-fascist liberals Carlo Sforza and Benedetto Croce, as well as Palmiro Togliatti. Although temporarily put aside, the question of Italian institutions remained one of the main open political questions. Most of the forces supporting the National Liberation Committee were openly republicans and believed that the monarchy, in particular Victor Emmanuel III, had had a responsibility in the success of the fascist movement. The final agreement between the parties was to ask that at the end of the war, as soon as conditions were favourable, the calling of elections, an institutional referendum and the formation of a constituent assembly. Until then, on 31 January 1945, the Council of Ministers, chaired by Ivanoe Bonomi, issued a decree which recognized women's right to vote. Universal suffrage was thus recognized, after the vain attempts made in 1881 and 1907 by women of the various parties.

The Bonomi governments (II then III) were succeeded by the Parri government in June 1945, then by the First De Gasperi government in December 1945. The question of the future form of the state, monarchy or republic, absorbed the minds of political circles. The majority of Christian Democratic activists, especially young people, increasingly distanced themselves from the monarchy. During the local meetings of the leaders of this party, in Rome and Milan, motions were presented aimed at making official a political line favorable to a democratic republic. The central political office tried to curb these pressures and maintain an intermediate position.

== Organization ==
On 16 March 1946, Prince Umberto decreed, as expected in 1944, that the question of the institutional form of the state would be decided by a referendum organized simultaneously with the election of a constituent assembly. The date was set for 2 June 1946. (Note: Anniversary of the death of Giuseppe Garibaldi.) The Supreme Court of Cassation was responsible for examining the appeals. Its role was to be limited to observing the progress of voting operations and consolidating the bulletins issued by the offices that communicated the results in each constituency. The counting of the ballots of the candidates for the constituent assembly had to precede that of the referendum. If the monarchy had won, it would have been the Constituent Assembly that would have had to choose the head of state.

=== Party positions ===
Choice	Party	Ideology	Leader
Republic	Christian Democracy (DC)	Christian democracy	Alcide De Gasperi
Republic	Italian Socialist Party of Proletarian Unity (PSIUP)	Socialism	Pietro Nenni
Republic	Italian Communist Party (PCI)	Communism	Palmiro Togliatti
Republic	Italian Republican Party (PRI)	Republicanism	Randolfo Pacciardi
Republic	Action Party (PdA)	Liberal socialism	Riccardo Lombardi
No official position	Common Man's Front (FUQ)	Populism	Guglielmo Giannini
Monarchy	National Democratic Union (UDN)	Liberalism	Collective leadership
Monarchy	National Bloc of Freedom (BNL)	Monarchism	Alfredo Covelli, Roberto Lucifero

=== Abdication and departure of King Victor Emmanuel III ===
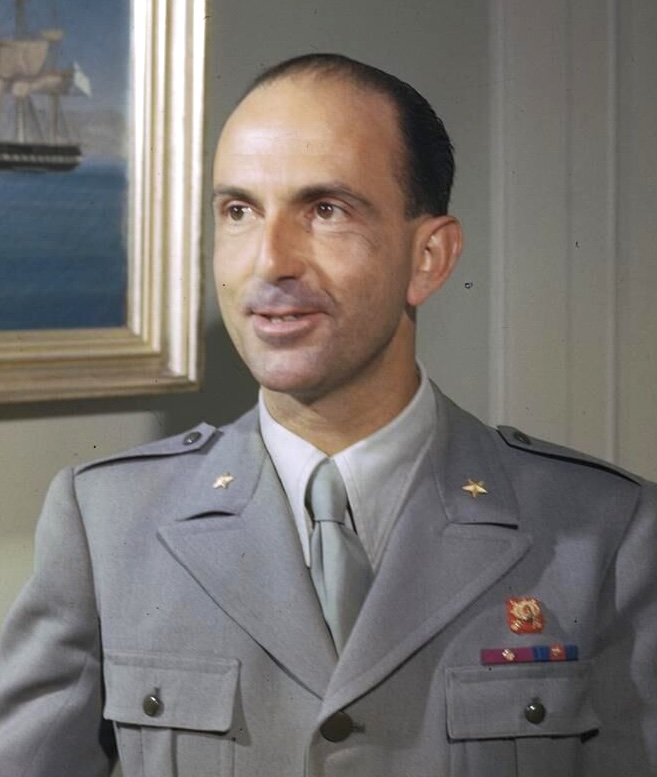
King Umberto II of Italy

Wanted by the Allies to verify that the conditions existed for voting in a country torn apart by the civil war only a few months earlier, partial municipal and provincial elections were held in March and April 1946 in half of the Italian municipalities and provinces. These elections, which mainly involved left-wing cities, brought out three parties, with a clear advantage for the Christian Democrats, led by Alcide De Gasperi, which exceeded the sum of votes cast for the Italian Communist Party and the Italian Socialist Party. After these administrative elections, the monarchists, already worried about the outcome of the referendum, became even more discouraged.

But a political event changed the situation during the referendum campaign. A month before the referendum, Victor Emmanuel III abdicated in favor of his son Umberto, who was proclaimed king and took the name Umberto II. The act of abdication, drawn up privately, is dated 9 May 1946. This abdication was desired by the monarchists, since the crown prince was less compromised than his father in Mussolini's rise to power and in coexistence with the fascist forces. It is also possible that the command of the allied forces present on Italian territory encouraged the sovereign to abdicate in favor of his son. The former king immediately left Italy for Alexandria in Egypt. Umberto II confirmed his promise to respect the popular decision regarding the referendum. The representatives of the parties in favor of the Republic protested, arguing the assumption of royal powers by the lieutenant general conflicted with an article of the legislative decree of 16 March 1946 that aimed at guaranteeing institutional stability before the announcement of the results. For observers, the gap between republicans and monarchists was narrowing, which increased tension in the final phase of the electoral campaign. In fact, some scuffles broke out between activists of the two sides in the tense climate.

== Results ==
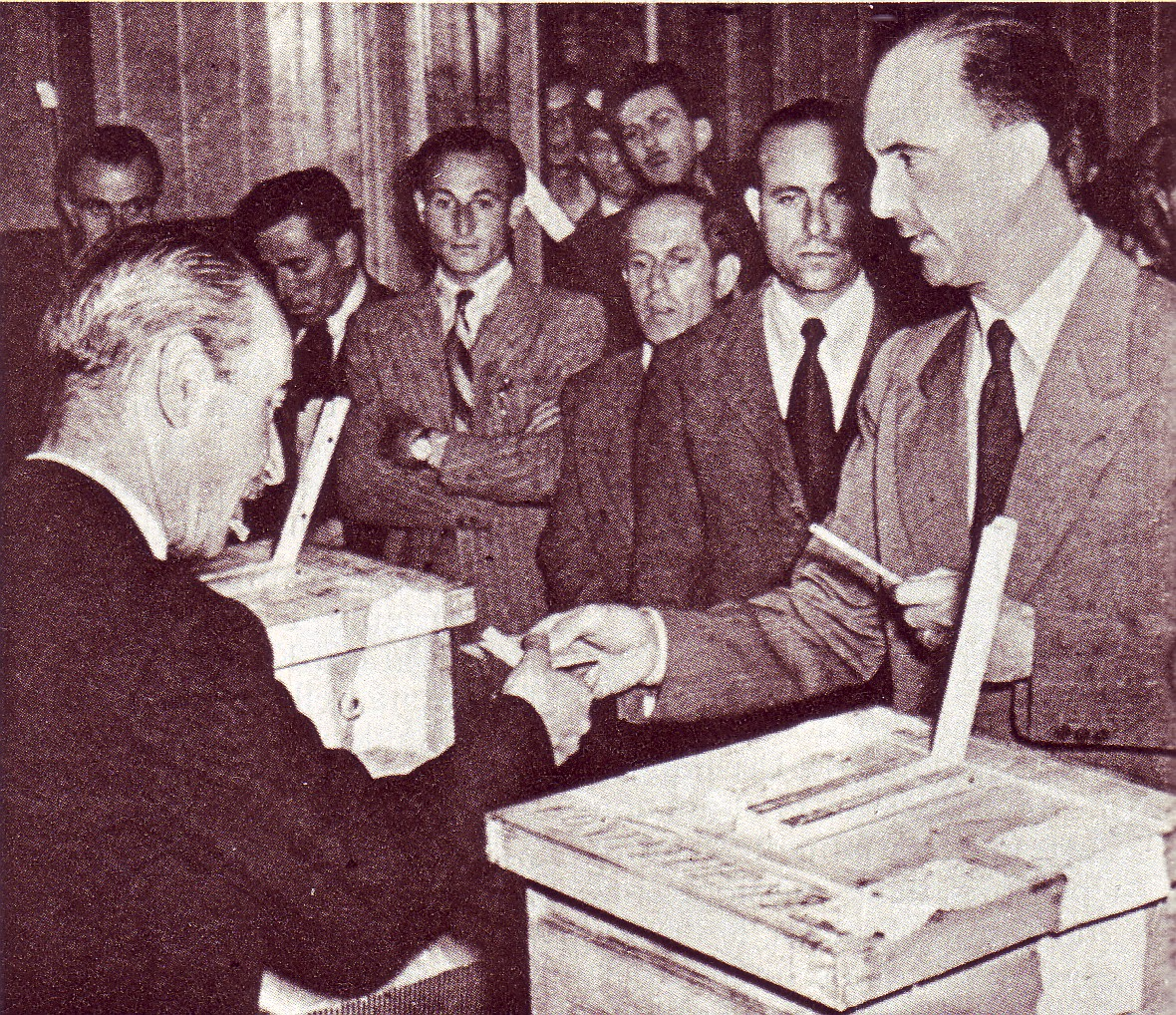
King Umberto II at the polls to vote in the Italian institutional referendum

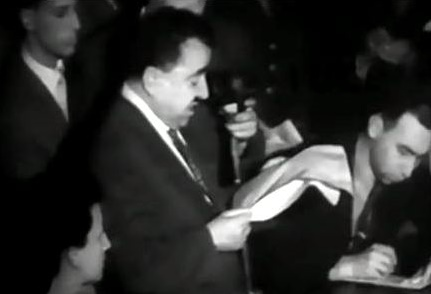
The Minister of the Interior Giuseppe Romita announces the results of the votes for the Italian institutional referendum.

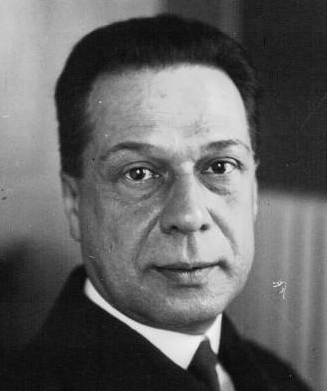
The prosecutor of the Supreme Court of Cassation Massimo Pilotti

The vote for the choice between monarchy or republic took place on 2 June and on the morning of 3 June 1946. After the transfer of the electoral cards from all of Italy and the minutes of the 31 constituencies to Rome, the results were expected on 8 June. On 10 June, the still provisional results were announced, and the final ones were communicated later due to missing data in some polling stations and after the examination of numerous appeals regarding the contested referendum ballots. In fact, 21,000 disputes occurred over the referendum ballots, most of which were quickly resolved. However, the period of uncertainty between the end of the vote and the final official announcement of the results only strengthened tensions in the country. In the city of Naples, in Apulia, in Calabria and in Sicily, the monarchists carried out protest demonstrations, sometimes violent. On 7 June, a monarchist student, soon transformed into a martyr, was killed.

One of the complaints submitted to the Supreme Court of Cassation is particularly delicate. This controversy was over the definition of "majority". The monarchists believed that it was necessary to take into account not the majority of votes cast, but the "majority of electors", as an article of the electoral law provided. The public prosecutor of the Supreme Court of Cassation, Massimo Pilotti, deemed this appeal admissible. In his indictment Pilotti believed that the spirit and letter of the decrees as well as jurisprudence provide for the counting of voters, without excluding blank or invalid ballots. But the Supreme Court of Cassation ruled against him, with 12 votes against to 7. On the one hand, it was believed that the vote, as a legal act, manifested a will and that the blank or null vote could be assimilated to the absence of expression of will. The Supreme Court of Cassation also identified another decree which specified that only "validly cast" votes should be preserved. The Supreme Court of Cassation finally announced that no law or decree dealt with the need for an absolute majority.

The final results were announced on 18 June 1946. Voter turnout was 89%, with 54% of the votes cast for the republic and 46% for the monarchy. The analysis of the data by region showed an Italy practically divided in two: in the north the republic won with 66% of the votes cast, and the monarchy in the south with 64% of the votes.

The supporters of the republic chose the effigy of the Italia turrita, the national personification of Italy, as their unitary symbol to be used in the electoral campaign and on the referendum ballot on the institutional form of the state, in contrast to the Savoy coat of arms, which represented the monarchy. This triggered various controversies, given that the iconography of the allegorical personification of Italy had, and still has, a universal and unifying meaning that should have been common to all Italians and not only to a part of them: this was the last appearance in the institutional context of Italia turrita.

However, some voters were unable to vote. Before the closure of the electoral lists in April 1945, many Italian soldiers were still outside the national territory, in detention or internment camps abroad. Citizens of the provinces of Bolzano, Gorizia, Trieste, Pola, Fiume and Zara, located in territories not administered by the Italian government but by the Allied authorities, which were still under occupation pending a final settlement of the status of the territories (in fact in 1947 most of these territories were then annexed by Yugoslavia after the Paris peace treaties of 1947, such as most of the Julian March and the province of Zara). These provinces, however, were all located in the north of the country, an area where the Republican vote obtained a fairly large majority.

Choice	Votes	%
Republic	12,718,641	54.27
Monarchy	10,718,502	45.73
Total	23,437,143	100.00
Valid votes	23,437,143	93.95
Invalid/blank votes	1,509,735	6.05
Total votes	24,946,878	100.00
Registered voters/turnout	28,005,449	89.08
Source: Official Gazette

Institutional referendum results (excluding invalid votes)
Republic; 12,718,641 (54.3%)	Monarchy; 10,718,502 (45.7%)
▲50%

=== By district ===
Results by district showing percentage of support for the republic (blue) or monarchy (red). White signifies no referendum held.

The conservative, rural Mezzogiorno (southern Italy) region voted solidly for the monarchy (63.8%) while the more urbanised and industrialised Nord (northern Italy) voted equally firmly for a republic (66.2%).

District	Provinces	Republic		Monarchy		Voters	Turnout
District	Provinces	Votes	%	Votes	%	Voters	Turnout
Aosta	Aosta	28,516	63.47	16,411	36.53	50,946	84.00
Turin	Turin • Novara • Vercelli	803,191	59.90	537,693	40.10	1,426,036	91.12
Cuneo	Cuneo • Alessandria • Asti	412,666	51.93	381,977	48.07	867,945	89.75
Genoa	Genoa • Imperia • La Spezia • Savona	633,821	69.05	284,116	30.95	960,214	85.62
Milan	Milan • Pavia	1,152,832	68.01	542,141	31.99	1,776,444	90.31
Como	Como • Sondrio • Varese	422,557	63.59	241,924	36.41	715,755	90.98
Brescia	Brescia • Bergamo	404,719	53.84	346,995	46.16	805,808	91.67
Mantua	Mantua • Cremona	304,472	67.19	148,668	32.81	486,354	93.83
Trento	Trento	192,123	85.00	33,903	15.00	238,198	91.04
Verona	Verona • Padua • Rovigo • Vicenza	648,137	56.24	504,405	43.76	1,258,804	92.22
Venice	Venice • Treviso	403,424	61.52	252,346	38.48	712,475	91.49
Udine	Udine • Belluno	339,858	63.07	199,019	36.93	592,463	88.51
Bologna	Bologna • Ferrara • Forlì • Ravenna	880,463	80.46	213,861	19.54	1,151,376	92.40
Parma	Parma • Modena • Piacenza • Reggio Emilia	646,214	72.78	241,663	27.22	955,660	92.58
Florence	Florence • Pistoia	487,039	71.58	193,414	28.42	723,028	92.08
Pisa	Pisa • Livorno • Lucca • Massa-Carrara	456,005	70.12	194,299	29.88	703,016	89.99
Siena	Siena • Arezzo • Grosseto	338,039	73.84	119,779	26.16	487,485	92.72
Ancona	Ancona • Ascoli Piceno • Macerata • Pesaro	499,566	70.12	212,925	29.88	759,011	91.65
Perugia	Perugia • Terni • Rieti	336,641	66.70	168,103	33.30	538,136	90.26
Rome	Rome • Frosinone • Latina • Viterbo	711,260	48.99	740,546	51.01	1,510,656	84.07
L'Aquila	L'Aquila • Chieti • Pescara • Teramo	286,291	46.78	325,701	53.22	648,932	87.61
Benevento	Benevento • Campobasso	103,900	30.06	241,768	69.94	369,616	88.82
Naples	Naples • Caserta	241,973	21.12	903,651	78.88	1,207,906	84.77
Salerno	Salerno • Avellino	153,978	27.09	414,521	72.91	607,530	88.05
Bari	Bari • Foggia	320,405	38.51	511,596	61.49	865,951	90.15
Lecce	Lecce • Brindisi • Taranto	147,346	24.70	449,253	75.30	630,987	90.04
Potenza	Potenza • Matera	108,289	40.61	158,345	59.39	286,575	88.70
Catanzaro	Catanzaro • Cosenza • Reggio Calabria	338,959	39.72	514,344	60.28	900,635	85.56
Catania	Catania • Enna • Messina • Ragusa • Syracuse	329,874	31.76	708,874	68.24	1,107,524	85.28
Palermo	Palermo • Agrigento • Caltanissetta • Trapani	379,871	38.98	594,686	61.02	1,032,102	85.77
Cagliari	Cagliari • Nuoro • Sassari	206,192	39.07	321,555	60.93	569,574	85.91
Italy		12,718,641	54.27	10,718,502	45.73	24,946,878	89.08
Source: Ministry of the Interior

=== By most populated city ===
City	Republic		Monarchy		Voters	Turnout
City	Votes	%	Votes	%	Voters	Turnout
Turin	252,001	61.41	158,138	38.59	426,563	87.44
Milan	487,125	67.77	231,711	32.23	737,440	85.65
Genoa	294,254	73.65	105,291	26.35	410,152	81.97
Venice	101,084	62.27	61,245	37.73	171,836	90.49
Bologna	137,093	67.72	65,359	32.28	209,776	90.49
Florence	148,763	63.43	85,753	36.57	242,750	88.78
Rome	353,715	46.17	412,439	53.83	783,865	80.80
Naples	87,448	20.06	348,420	79.94	451,463	80.79

=== Provinces excluded from voting ===
The referendum was not held in the Julian March, in the province of Zara or the province of Bolzano, which were still under occupation by Allied forces pending a final settlement of the status of the territories.

Province	Population
Zara	25,000
Trieste, Pola, Gorizia, Fiume	1,300,000
Bolzano	300,000

=== Results of the Constituent Assembly elections ===
The distribution of votes is as follows:

Party	Percentage of votes	Seats
Christian Democracy	37.2%	207
Italian Socialist Party	20.7%	115
Italian Communist Party	18.7%	104
National Democratic Union	7.4%	41
Common Man's Front	5.4%	30
Italian Republican Party	4.1%	23
National Bloc of Freedom	2.9%	16
Action Party	1.3%	7
Others	2.3%	13

=== Analysis of voting results ===
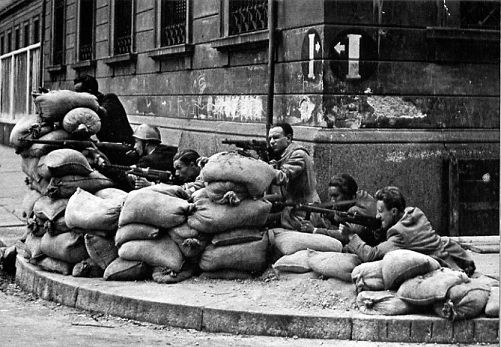
Italian partisans in Milan during the liberation of Italy, April 1945

At first glance, the referendum seemed to simply divide Italy in two, between North and South, but the situation was more complex. For example, the districts located to the north of Rome gave the majority to the republic, while those located to the south chose the monarchy. The electoral college of Rome was very divided and gave a slight majority to the choice of the monarchic regime. The Republican choice turned into a plebiscite, with over 80% of the votes cast in the electoral college of Bologna, and even more in that of Trento. In the South, however, the monarchist choice reached nearly 80% in the college of Naples. But, in other regions, the vote was very fragmented. There was not a total break with the past, but an interference between the two possible choices, which was expressed everywhere.

The occupation of the North by the German forces and the period of the Italian Civil War, with the fascist forces, undoubtedly favored an increase in the importance of the socialist and communist parties in this region, which were republican in tendency. During these dark years, the populations concerned placed part of their hopes in dreams of revolution, or at least of change. The South, not having experienced this situation and having welcomed King Victor Emmanuel III and his government, was perhaps more wary of these parties and placed its trust in the monarchic regime, preferring continuity to the "leap into the unknown" represented by the republican form. Furthermore, the clientelism prevalent in the South favored a vote that tended to be conservative, and therefore monarchist. Some analysts also cite the influence of the Catholic Church or the Catholic press. Other authors have highlighted more structural factors, such as differences in family organization or production by region. Thus Carlo Bacetti compared, in Tuscany, the importance of metayage in the organization of work on the land, and the weight of the Communist Party in this region, which had republican tendencies.

== Aftermath ==
=== First results and events in Naples ===
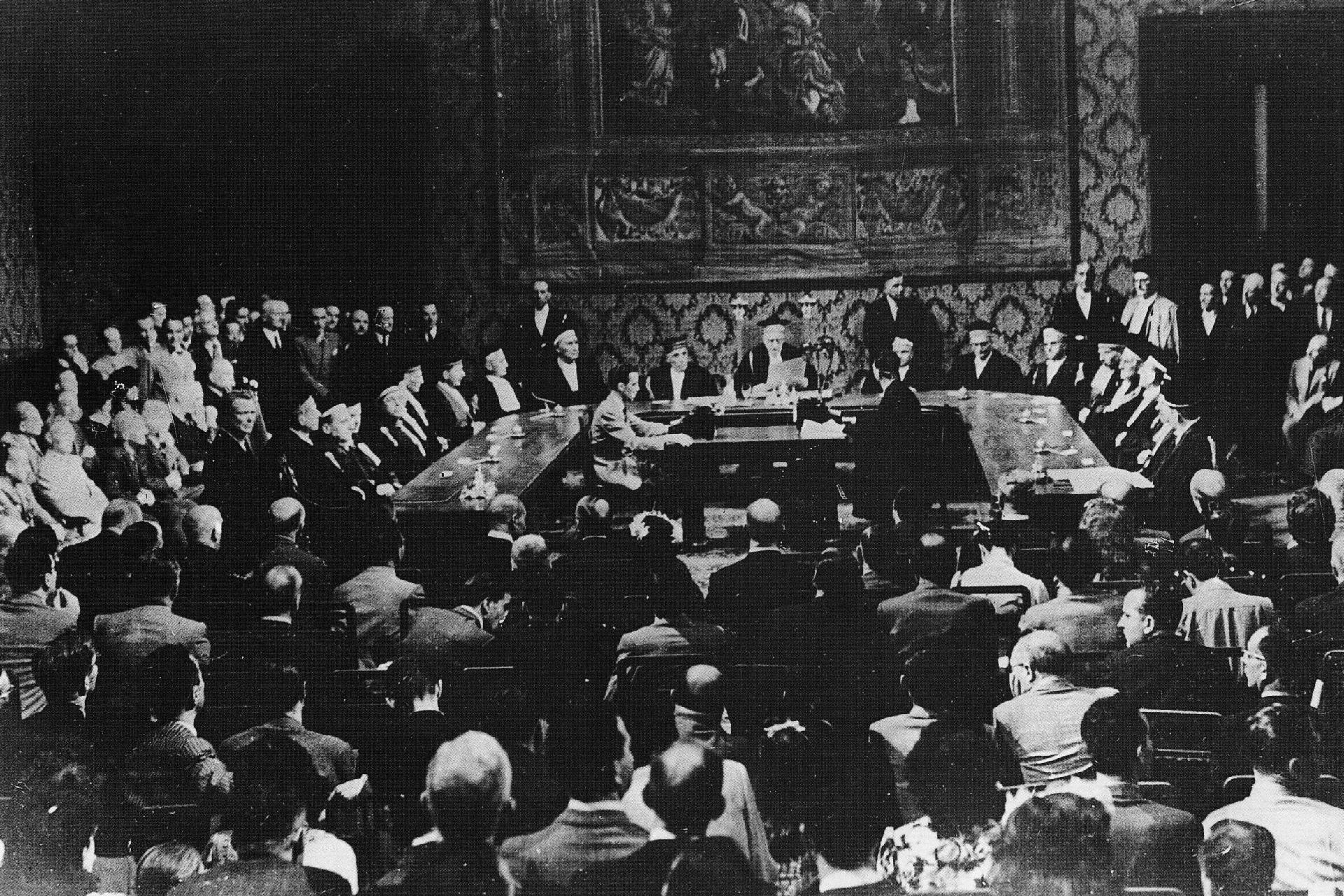
Session of the Supreme Court of Cassation on 10 June 1946, which approved the results of the Italian institutional referendum

On 10 June, at 6 pm, in the Sala della Lupa ("Hall of the Wolf"), which owes its name to the presence of a bronze sculpture of the Capitoline Wolf, of Palazzo Montecitorio in Rome, the Supreme Court of Cassation read out the partial results of the referendum, postponing the definitive proclamation of the results to Parliament for 18 June, after having taken the relevant decisions on appeals, protests and complaints. At the same time, republican demonstrations took place in many cities. The Milanese newspaper, Corriere della Sera, on Tuesday 11 June, ran the headline: "The Italian Republic is born". La Stampa, a Turin daily newspaper, declared more soberly: "The government confirms the victory of the republicans", and completed its coverage by asking: "the question is whether the republic has been proclaimed or not".

In Naples, a city with a population largely supportive of the monarchy, an incident occurred on 11 June. A procession of supporters of the monarchy advanced towards the municipal buildings and then changed objective and headed towards the headquarters of the Italian Communist Party. The crowd saw a red flag, but also a tricolor flag from which the royal coat of arms had been cut. Despite the presence of armored vehicles, the demonstrators attempted to storm the communist party headquarters. Protesters and law enforcement officers exchange gunfire. According to the prefect's report, the demonstrators shot first. In any case the response was deadly, with machine gun fire. There were nine deaths among royalist demonstrators and a large number of injuries. Calm returned to the city only on 13 June.

The protests of the monarchists, like those bloodily repressed the day before in Naples and a new monarchist demonstration dispersed on 12 June, aroused the concerns of the ministers intending to establish the Republic as soon as possible (according to the famous phrase of the socialist leader Pietro Nenni: "either the Republic or chaos!").

=== Early establishment of the republic and departure of the former king ===
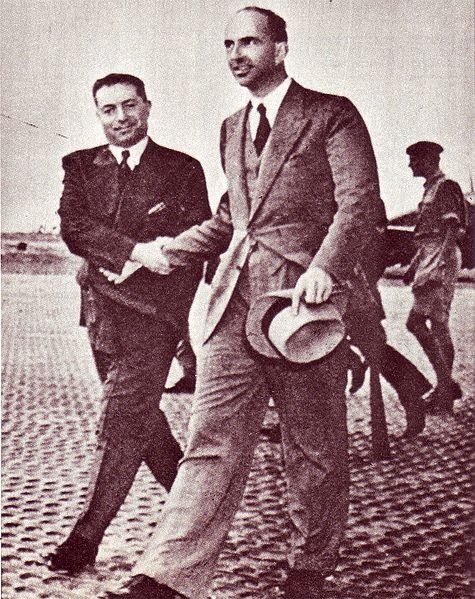
Former King Umberto II leaves Italy from Ciampino–G. B. Pastine International Airport on 13 June 1946.

On the night of 12 June, the government met at Alcide De Gasperi's invitation. The Prime Minister received a written communication from the King, in which he said he was ready to respect the verdict of the electors' vote, but adding that he would await the final declaration of the Supreme Court of Cassation. The letter and the protests of the monarchists, like the bloody events of the day before in Naples, as well as the new demonstrations announced by the monarchists worried the ministers.

On 13 June, the Council of Ministers, extending the meeting begun the previous day, resolved that, following the proclamation of the provisional results on 10 June, the functions of provisional head of state would be exercised by Prime Minister Alcide De Gasperi, without wait for the final official confirmation from the Court of Cassation. The Prime Minister collected all the votes of the government members, with the exception of the liberal minister Leone Cattani.

Although some members of his entourage encouraged him to oppose this decision, the king, informed, decided to leave the country the following day, thus making a peaceful transfer of power possible, not without having denounced De Gasperi's "revolutionary gesture".

The former King of Italy, Umberto II, decided to leave Italy on 13 June, without even waiting for the results to be defined and the ruling on the appeals presented by the monarchist party, to avoid the clashes between monarchists and republicans, already manifested in bloody events in various Italian cities, for fear they could extend throughout the country. He went into exile in Cascais, Portugal.

=== Changing the national flag and the national anthem ===
Flag of the Kingdom of Italy (1861–1946)

Flag of the Italian Republic (1946–present)

On the same day as the former king's departure, the flag of Italy with the Savoy coat of arms in the centre was lowered from the Quirinal Palace. The Italian flag was modified with the decree of the president of the Council of Ministers No. 1 of 19 June 1946. Compared to the monarchic banner, the Savoy coat of arms was eliminated. This decision was later confirmed in the session of 24 March 1947 by the Constituent Assembly, which decreed the insertion of article 12 of the Italian Constitution, subsequently ratified by the Italian Parliament, which states:

[...] The flag of the Republic is the Italian tricolour: green, white, and red, in three vertical bands of equal dimensions. [...]

— Article 12 of Constitution of Italian Republic

The Republican tricolour was then officially and solemnly delivered to the Italian military corps on 4 November 1947 on the occasion of National Unity and Armed Forces Day. The universally adopted ratio is 2:3, while the war flag is squared (1:1). Each comune also has a gonfalone bearing its coat of arms. On 27 May 1949, a law was passed that described and regulated the way the flag was displayed outside public buildings and during national holidays.

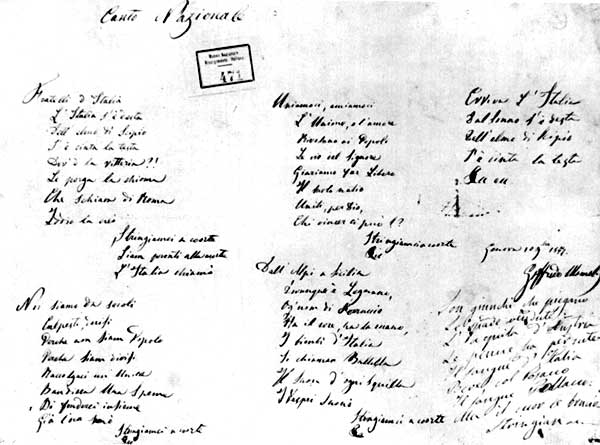
Holographic copy of 1847 of "Il Canto degli Italiani", the Italian national anthem since 1946

After the birth of the Italian Republic, "La leggenda del Piave" was temporarily chosen as the provisional national anthem, which replaced "Marcia Reale", the national anthem of the Kingdom of Italy. For the choice of the national anthem a debate was opened which identified, among the possible options: the "Va, pensiero" from Giuseppe Verdi's Nabucco, the drafting of a completely new musical piece, "Il Canto degli Italiani", the "Inno di Garibaldi" and the confirmation of "La Leggenda del Piave". The political class of the time then approved the proposal of the War Minister Cipriano Facchinetti, who foresaw the adoption of "Il Canto degli Italiani" as a provisional anthem of the State.

"La Leggenda del Piave" then had the function of the national anthem of the Italian Republic until the Council of Ministers of 12 October 1946, when Cipriano Facchinetti (of republican political belief), officially announced that during the celebrations of 4 November for National Unity and Armed Forces Day, in which the armed services of the republic will perform their oath of loyalty to the young republic, as a provisional anthem, "Il Canto degli Italiani" would have been adopted. The press release stated that:

... On the proposal of the Minister of War it was established that the oath of the Armed Forces to the Republic and to its Chief would be carried out on November 4th p.v. and that, temporarily, the anthem of Mameli is adopted as the national anthem ...

— Cipriano Facchinetti

"Il Canto degli Italiani" was therefore chosen, on 12 October 1946, as the provisional national anthem, a role that it later preserved while remaining the de facto anthem of the Italian Republic. Over the decades there were several unsuccessful attempts to make it the official national anthem, until it finally gained official status on 4 December 2017.

=== Final announcement of results and first steps of the Italian Republic ===
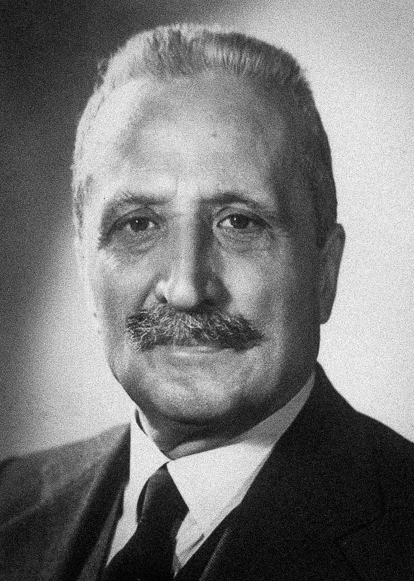
Enrico De Nicola, the first president of Italy

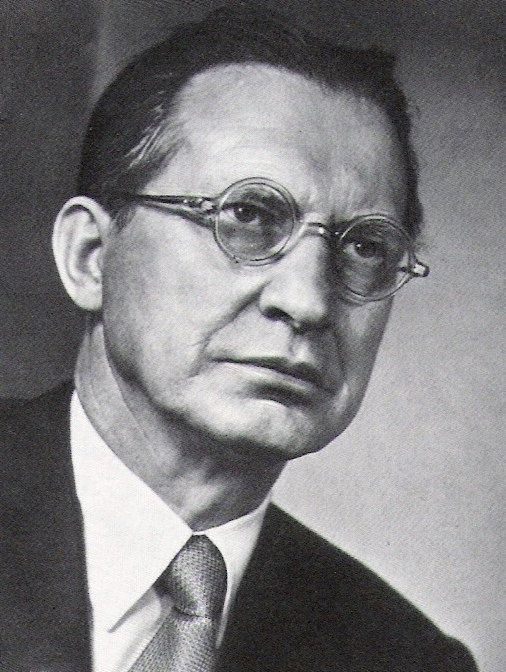
Alcide De Gasperi, first republican Prime Minister of Italy and one of the Founding fathers of the European Union

On 18 June 1946 at 6 pm, in the Sala della Lupa of Palazzo Montecitorio in Rome, the Supreme Court of Cassation proceeded to proclaim the results of the referendum, without accompanying this formalization with reservations as it had done previously. Many years later, in 1960, the president of this Court, Giuseppe Pagano, declared that the law establishing the organization of the referendum was incompatible with the slowness of the counting and the very unequal transmission of the minutes, not giving the Court time to complete all investigations.

In the first session of the Constituent Assembly, on 28 June 1946, Enrico De Nicola was elected provisional head of the State, in the first round with 396 votes out of 501. In addition to his personal qualities, the choice of a man born in Naples and long monarchic history, it was a sign of pacification and union towards the populations of southern Italy, in this accelerated transition towards the Republic. He was initially only provisional head of state and not president of Italy, since the latter did not yet have a constitution. Alcide De Gasperi resigned and then regained the task of forming a new government, thus becoming the last Prime Minister of the monarchic era and the first of republican Italy.

On 1 January 1948, the Republican Constitution came into force, the content of which was discussed within the Constituent Assembly. It proclaims in particular that "Italy is a democratic republic founded on labour" and that "the former kings of the House of Savoy, their wives and their male descendants are prohibited from entering and staying in the national territory". Enrico De Nicola then assumed the title of President of Italy. The validity of the provision that prohibited the entry in Italy of some members of the House of Savoy ceased with the entry into force of the Constitutional Law of 23 October 2002, No. 1, after a debate in parliament and in the country that lasted many years and Vittorio Emanuele, Prince of Naples, son of King Umberto II, was able to enter Italy with his family already in the following December for a short visit. (Note: Many Italian monarchists, however, do not recognize Vittorio Emanuele, Prince of Naples, as a pretender to the throne, preferring his cousin Amedeo, Duke of Aosta, who has never suffered limitations on access and residence in the Italian territory. Indeed, on 7 July 2006, Vittorio Emanuele's kinsman and dynastic rival, Amedeo, Duke of Aosta declared himself to be the head of the House of Savoy and Duke of Savoy, claiming that Vittorio Emanuele had lost his dynastic rights when he married without the permission of Umberto II in 1971.) The former queen Marie-José had already been authorized to return to Italy in 1987 since, with the death of her husband Umberto II and having become a widow, her status as "spouse" was recognized as having ceased.

=== The symbolic photo of the birth of the Republic ===
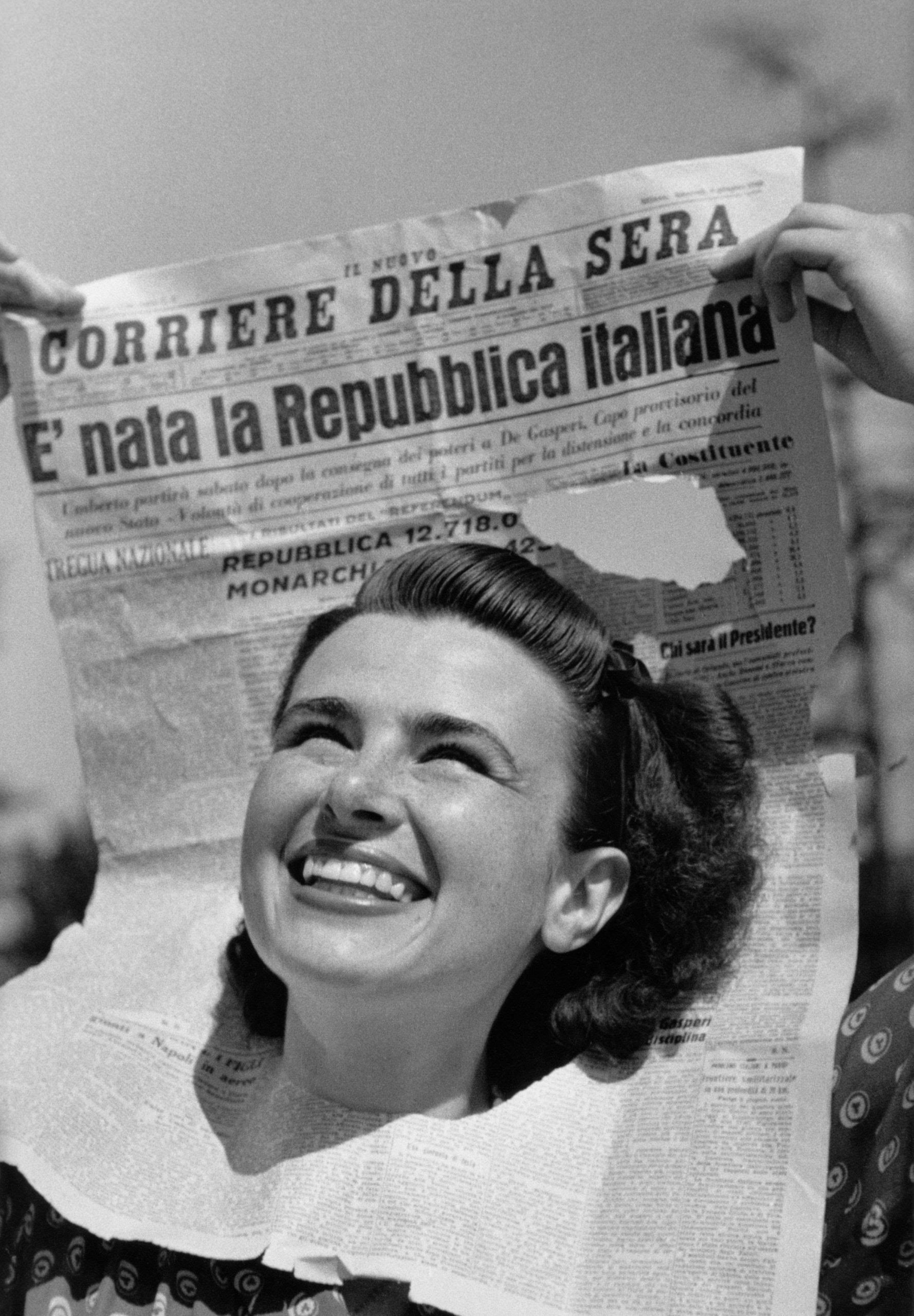
The symbolic photo of the birth of the Republic, which portrays the face of a young woman emerging from a copy of Il Corriere della Sera of 6 June 1946 with the title «È nata la Repubblica Italiana» ("The Italian Republic is born").

The photo, which later became a "symbol" of the celebrations for the outcome of the referendum, portrays the face of a young woman emerging from a copy of Il Corriere della Sera of 6 June 1946 with the title «È nata la Repubblica Italiana» ("The Italian Republic is born").

The symbolic photo of the birth of the Republic was taken by Federico Patellani for the weekly Tempo (n. 22, 15–22 June 1946) as part of a photo shoot celebrating the Republic and the new role of women; it was also featured on the front page of the Il Corriere della Sera itself and was later reused in many campaigns and posters.

Only in 2016 was the woman identified as Anna Iberti (1922–1997).

=== Festa della Repubblica ===
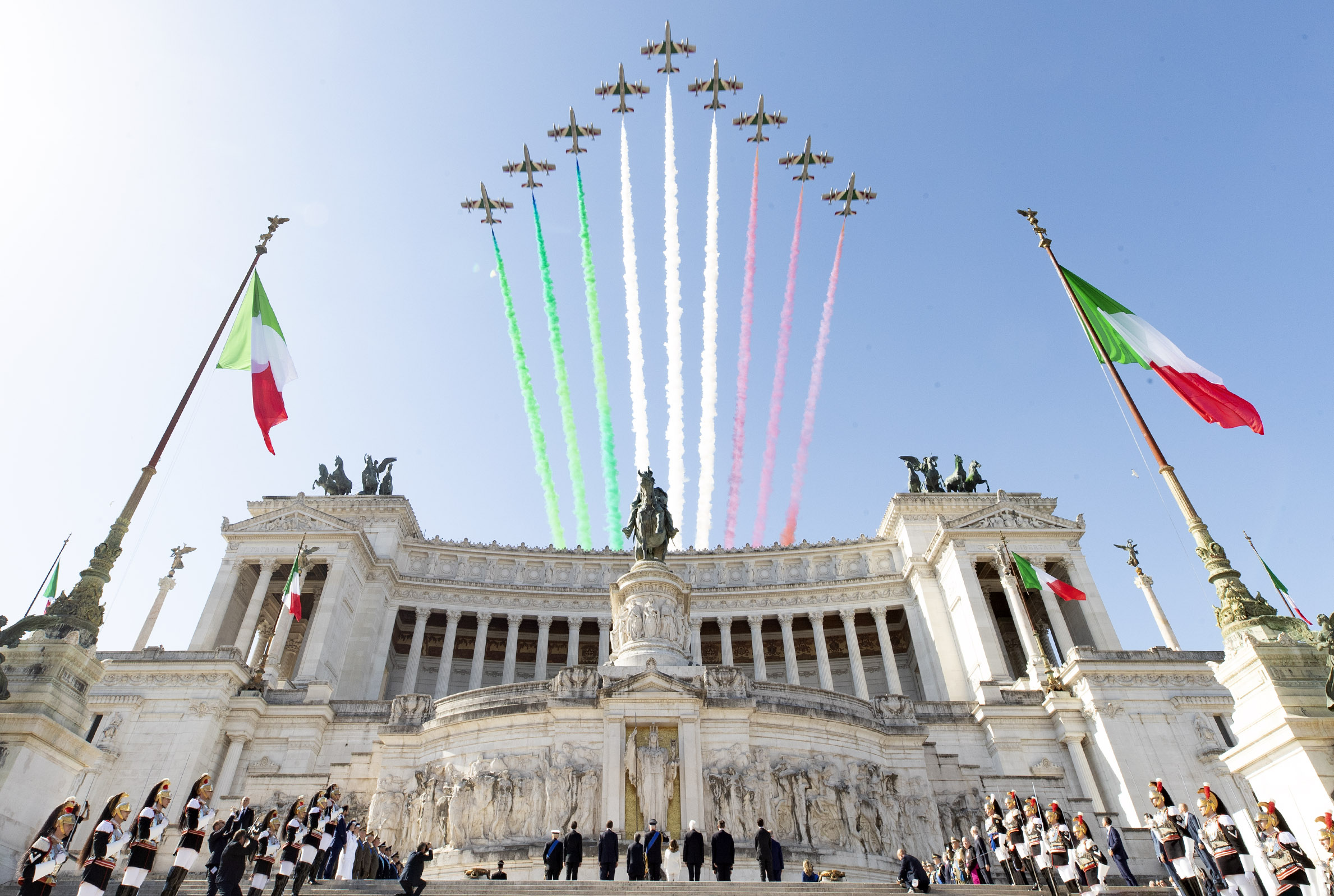
The Frecce Tricolori, with the smoke trail representing the national colours of Italy, above the Altare della Patria in Rome during the celebrations of the Festa della Repubblica in 2022

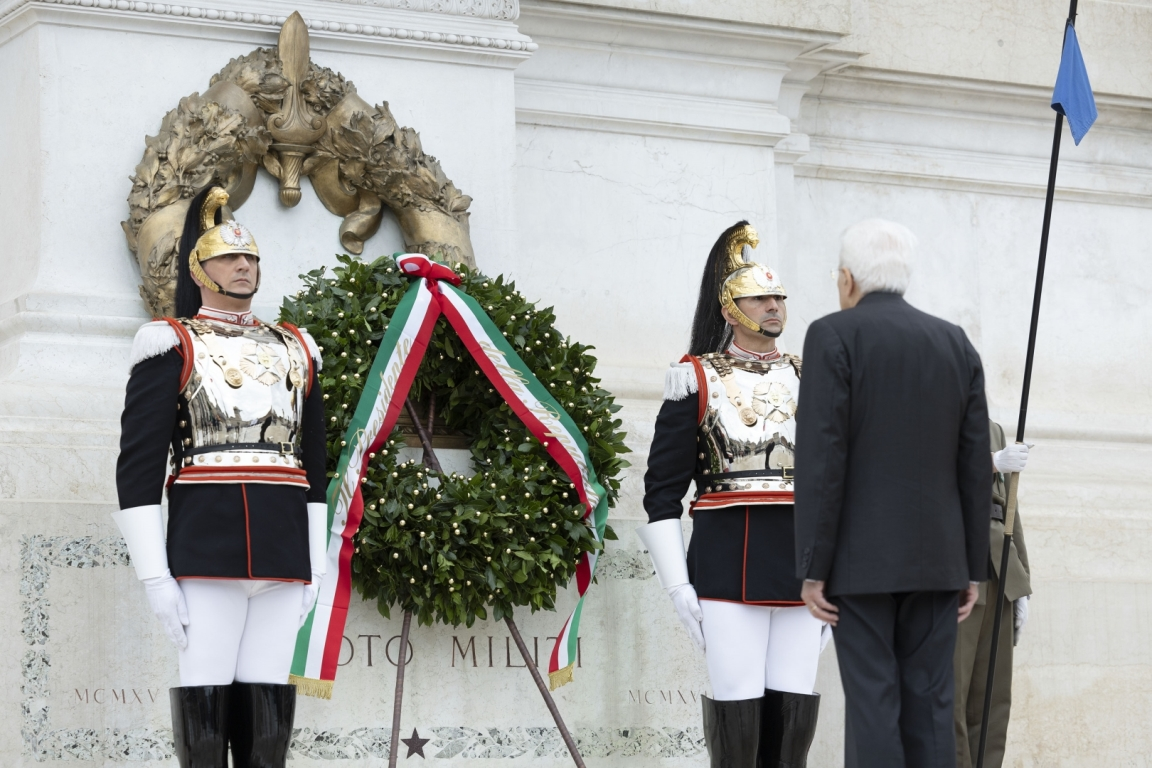
President of Italy Sergio Mattarella, escorted by the Corazzieri, pays tribute to the Italian Unknown Soldier at the Altare della Patria in Rome during the celebrations of the Festa della Repubblica in 2024.

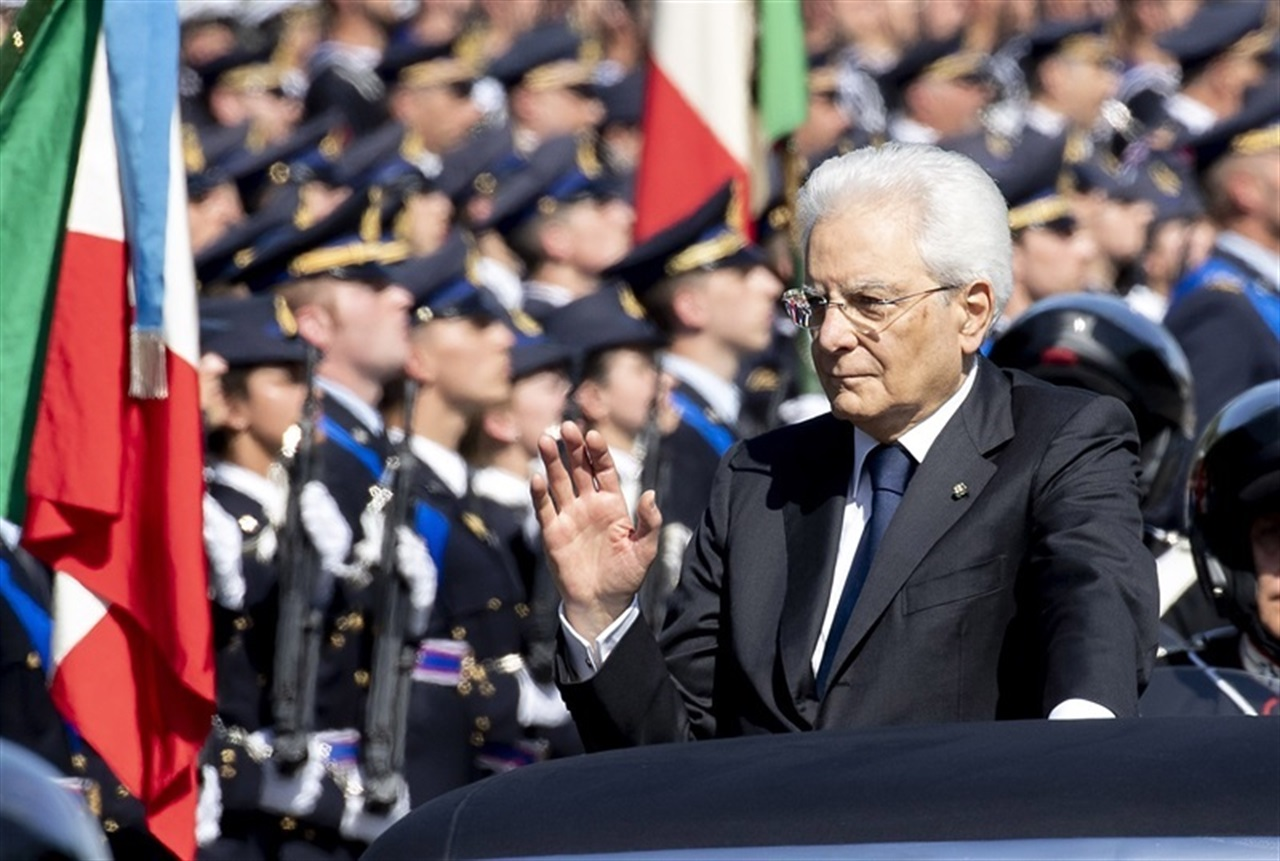
President of Italy Sergio Mattarella on the presidential car Lancia Flaminia along Via dei Fori Imperiali in Rome during the military parade of the Festa della Repubblica in 2018

Festa della Repubblica (Italian: [ˈfɛsta della reˈpubblika]; English: Republic Day) is the Italian National Day and Republic Day, which is celebrated on 2 June each year, with the main celebration taking place in Rome. The Festa della Repubblica is one of the national symbols of Italy. The day commemorates the institutional referendum held by universal suffrage in 1946, in which the Italian people were called to the polls to decide on the form of government following World War II and the fall of Fascism, monarchy or republic. On 2 June the birth of the modern Italian Republic is celebrated in a similar way to the French 14 July (anniversary of the storming of the Bastille) and to 4 July in the United States (anniversary of the declaration of independence from Great Britain). The first celebration of the Festa della Repubblica took place on 2 June 1947, while in 1948 there was the first military parade in Via dei Fori Imperiali in Rome; 2 June was definitively declared a national holiday in 1949.

The official ceremony of the Rome celebration includes the solemn flag-raising ceremony at the Altare della Patria and the tribute to the Italian Unknown Soldier with the deposition of a laurel wreath by the President of Italy in the presence of the most important officers of the State, or of the President of the Senate, the President of the Chamber of Deputies, the President of the Council of Ministers, the President of the Constitutional Court, the Minister of Defense and the Chief of Defense. After the playing of the National Anthem Il Canto degli Italiani, the Frecce Tricolori cross the skies of Rome.

Following the ceremony the President is then driven to Via di San Gregorio with the presidential Lancia Flaminia escorted by a patrol group of Corazzieri on a motorcycle where, together with the military commander of the capital garrison, usually a Major General, he reviews the parade formations presenting arms as the bands play their service or inspection marches. The Head of State then processes to the presidential tribune which is located in Via dei Fori Imperiali, gets down the vehicle, and processes there to meet other dignitaries and as he arrives in his spot in the dais the Corazzieri's mounted troopers, which had provided the rear escort during the review phrase, salute the President as the anthem is played. It is tradition, for the members of the Italian government and for the presidents of the two chambers of parliament, to have pinned on their jacket, during the whole ceremony, an Italian tricolor cockade. Following the anthem, the military parade begins, which the ground columns of military personnel saluting the President with eyes left or right with their colours dipped as they march past the dais. Mobile column crew contingent colour guards perform the salute in a like manner. The military parade also includes some military delegations from the United Nations, NATO, the European Union and representatives of multinational departments with an Italian component.

On the holiday, at the Quirinale Palace, the Changing of the Guard with the Corazzieri Regiment and the Fanfare of the Carabinieri Cavalry Regiment in high uniform is carried out in solemn form. This solemn rite is only performed on two other occasions, during the celebrations of the Tricolour Day (7 January) and the National Unity and Armed Forces Day (4 November). Official ceremonies are held throughout the national territory. Among them are the traditional receptions organized by each prefecture for the local authorities, which are preceded by solemn public demonstrations with reduced military parades that have been reviewed by the prefect in his capacity as the highest governmental authority in the province. Similar ceremonies are also organized by the Regions and Municipalities. All over the world, Italian embassies organize ceremonies to which the Heads of State of the host country are invited. Greetings from the other Heads of State reach the President of Italy from all over the world.

== See also ==
- 1946 Italian general election
- Constituent Assembly of Italy
- Democracy in Europe
- History of the Italian Republic
- History of the Kingdom of Italy (1861–1946)
- Italian presidential elections
- Kingdom of Italy
- List of presidents of Italy
- President of Italy
- Presidential standard of Italy
- Proclamation of the Kingdom of Italy
- Semestre bianco
- Spouses and companions of the presidents of Italy

== Sources ==
- Attal, Frédéric (2004). Histoire de l'Italie depuis 1943 à nos jours (in French). Éditions Armand Colin. ISBN 978-2200262150.
- Attal, Frédéric (2007). "La naissance de la République italienne (2-18 juin 1946)". Parlement(s): Revue d'histoire politique (in French). 1/2007 (7): 141–153. doi:10.3917/parl.007.0141.
- Baldoni, Adalberto (2000). La Destra in Italia - 1945-1969 (in Italian). Pantheon. ISBN 978-8874340262.
- Bartolotta, Francesco (1971). Parlamenti e Governi d'Italia dal 1848 al 1970 (in Italian). Vol. I. Vito Bianco Editore. [ISBN unspecified]
- Bassi, Adriano (2011). Fratelli d'Italia: I grandi personaggi del Risorgimento, la musica e l'unità (in Italian). Paoline. ISBN 978-88-315-3994-4.
- Baquiast, Paul; Dupuy, Emmanuel; Ridolfi, Maurizio (2007). L'idée républicaine en Europe (xviii^{e} – xxi^{e} siècle): histoire et pensée universelle, Europe - La République universelle (in French). Vol. 1. L'Harmattan. ISBN 978-2296027954.
- Battaglia, Roberto (1953). Storia della resistenza italiana (in Italian). Einaudi. ISBN 978-8806285715.
- Bazzano, Nicoletta (2011). Donna Italia. L'allegoria della Penisola dall'antichità ai giorni nostri (in Italian). Angelo Colla Editore. ISBN 978-88-96817-06-3.
- Bocca, Giorgio (1981). Storia della Repubblica italiana (in Italian). Rizzoli. [ISBN unspecified]
- Busico, Augusta (2005). Il tricolore: il simbolo la storia (in Italian). Presidenza del Consiglio dei Ministri, Dipartimento per l'informazione e l'editoria. SBN IT\ICCU\UBO\2771748.
- Calabrese, Michele (2011). "Il Canto degli Italiani: genesi e peripezie di un inno". Quaderni del Bobbio (in Italian). 3.
- Demarco, Marco (2007). L'altra metà della storia: spunti e riflessioni su Napoli da Lauro a Bassolino (in Italian). Guida Editori. ISBN 978-8860422699.
- Dreyfus, Michel (2000). "Carlo Rosselli, les néo-socialistes et la crise du socialisme international". Matériaux pour l'histoire de notre temps (in French). 57 (57): 22–28. doi:10.3406/mat.2000.404234.
- Foro, Philippe (2006). L'Italie fasciste (in French). Éditions Armand Colin. ISBN 978-2200269944.
- Franco, Massimo (2010). Andreotti (in Italian). Mondadori. ISBN 978-8852012891.
- Furlan, Paola (2006). "1946. I Comuni al voto Partecipazione politica e ricostruzione nelle origini della Repubblica". Storia e Futuro (in Italian) (11). Archived from the original on 21 November 2008.
- Gabrielli, Patrizia (2009). Il 1946, le donne, la Repubblica (in Italian). Donzelli Editore. ISBN 978-8860364401.
- Garrone, Alessandro Galante (1973). I radicali in Italia (1849-1925) (in Italian). Garzanti. [ISBN unspecified]
- Guichonnet, Paul (1975). Histoire de l'Italie (in French). Presses universitaires de France. [ISBN unspecified]
- Hospital, Jean d' (17 April 1946). "La situation des partis après les élections administratives". Le Monde (in French).
- Mack Smith, Denis (1990). I Savoia re d'Italia (in Italian). Bur. ISBN 978-8817115674.
- Mack Smith, Denis (1990). Italy and Its Monarchy. Yale University Press. ISBN 978-0300046618.
- Maiorino, Tarquinio; Marchetti Tricamo, Giuseppe; Zagami, Andrea (2002). Il tricolore degli italiani. Storia avventurosa della nostra bandiera (in Italian). Arnoldo Mondadori Editore. ISBN 978-88-04-50946-2.
- Marongiu, Jean-Baptiste (3 February 2005). "La Storia des partisans". Libération (in French).
- Mola, Aldo Alessandro (2008). Declino e crollo della Monarchia in Italia (in Italian). Mondadori. ISBN 978-8804579885.
- Mosca, Oreste (24 January 1960). "Giuseppe Pagano racconta come nacque la repubblica". Il Tempo (in Italian).
- Nobécourt, Jacques (2 June 1986). "Il y a quarante ans, l'Italie devient République". Le Monde (in French).
- Nohlen, Dieter; Stöver, Philip (2010). Elections in Europe: A data handboo. Nomos Verlagsgesellschaft Mbh & Co. ISBN 978-3-8329-5609-7.
- Pace, Eric (30 September 1999). "Leo Valiani, Writer, 90, Wartime Foe Of Mussolini". The New York Times.
- Ridolfi, Maurizio (2003). Almanacco della Repubblica. Storia d'Italia attraverso le tradizioni, le istituzioni e le simbologie repubblicane (in Italian). Mondadori Bruno. ISBN 978-8842494997.
- Romeo, Rosario (2011). Vita di Cavour (in Italian). Editori Laterzi. ISBN 978-8842074915.
- Spadolini, Giovanni (1989). L'opposizione laica nell'Italia moderna (1861-1922) (in Italian). Le Monnier. ISBN 978-8800856256.
- Sapori, Julien (14 August 2009). "Les "foibe", une tragédie européenne". Libération (in French).
- Tarozzi, Fiorenza; Vecchio, Giorgio (1999). Gli italiani e il tricolore (in Italian). Il Mulino. ISBN 88-15-07163-6.
- Valiani, Leo (9 August 1993). "Ma ora io dico no ai Savoia". Corriere della Sera (in Italian).
- Vaussard, Maurice (27 September 1945). "Vers la constituante italienne". Le Monde (in French).
- Villa, Claudio (2010). I simboli della Repubblica: la bandiera tricolore, il canto degli italiani, l'emblema (in Italian). Comune di Vanzago. SBN IT\ICCU\LO1\1355389.
