= Pietro Barsanti =

Italian military soldier (1849–1870)

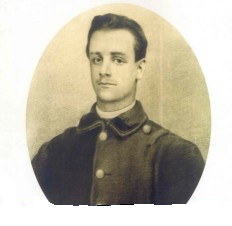
- Born: 30 July 1849; Borgo a Mozzano, Grand Duchy of Tuscany
- Died: 27 August 1870 (aged 21); Milan, Kingdom of Italy
- Occupation: Military soldier
- Known for: First martyr of the modern Italian Republic and a symbol of republican ideals in Italy

Pietro Barsanti (30 July 1849 – 27 August 1870) was an Italian military soldier. A supporter of republicanism and soldier in the Royal Italian Army with the rank of corporal, he was sentenced to death and shot for having favored an insurrectional attempt against the Savoy monarchy, and is therefore considered the first martyr of the modern Italian Republic, as well as a symbol of modern republicanism in Italy.

== Early life ==
Barsanti was born in Gioviano, a frazione of Borgo a Mozzano (at the time part of the Grand Duchy of Tuscany), to Vincenzo and Teresa. He undertook a religious education with the Clerics Regular of the Mother of God and then entered the delle Poverine military college in Florence and the military school of Maddaloni. Having enlisted in the Royal Italian Army and obtained the rank of corporal, he was sent to Reggio Calabria, where he joined the "Universal Republican Alliance", a society founded by Giuseppe Mazzini, which at the time was gathering new converts in the lower ranks of the Royal Italian Army. Transferred to Pavia, Pietro Barsanti served at the Lino barracks as a picket officer.

== Rebellion and death sentence ==
In 1870, insurrectional attempts occurred in various Italian locations after the withdrawal of French Army from Rome following the French defeat in the Franco-Prussian War, in the hope of annexing the Papal States to the Kingdom of Italy, an event which later occurred, putting an end to the unification of Italy with the capture of Rome on 20 September 1870. While republican rebellions against the monarchy and for the claim of Rome to Italy were raging in the Kingdom of Italy, the Lino barracks in Pavia were attacked on the morning of 24 March 1870 by around forty revolutionaries shouting "Down with the monarchy, long live the republic, long live Rome". Instead of calming the revolt, Barsanti refused to intervene against the demonstrators and, with the help of some accomplices, even kidnapped some non-commissioned officers, preventing the repression. Once the movement failed and the rebels dispersed, some soldiers who, together with Barsanti, had favored the Republican assault took to flight; he and other comrades remained, such as the Cremonese sergeant Nicola Pernice, who were arrested on charges of high treason.

In Milan, they were judged by the military tribunal; Pernice was sentenced to 20 years' imprisonment, while Barsanti and eight other defendants (who were contumacious), were sentenced to capital punishment on 27 May 1870. The military tribunal's sentence for Barsanti and Perince was issued on 16 August 1870. Solidarity initiatives arose towards the soldier near the capital punishment, since the sentence was considered excessive in relation to the crime, also for the ideological reasons that had inspired it. The Marquise Anna Pallavicino Trivulzio (Giorgio's wife) collected 40,000 women's signatures to present to King Victor Emmanuel II to invoke the pardon, rejected by the Council of Ministers on 18 August, by majority and secret ballot.

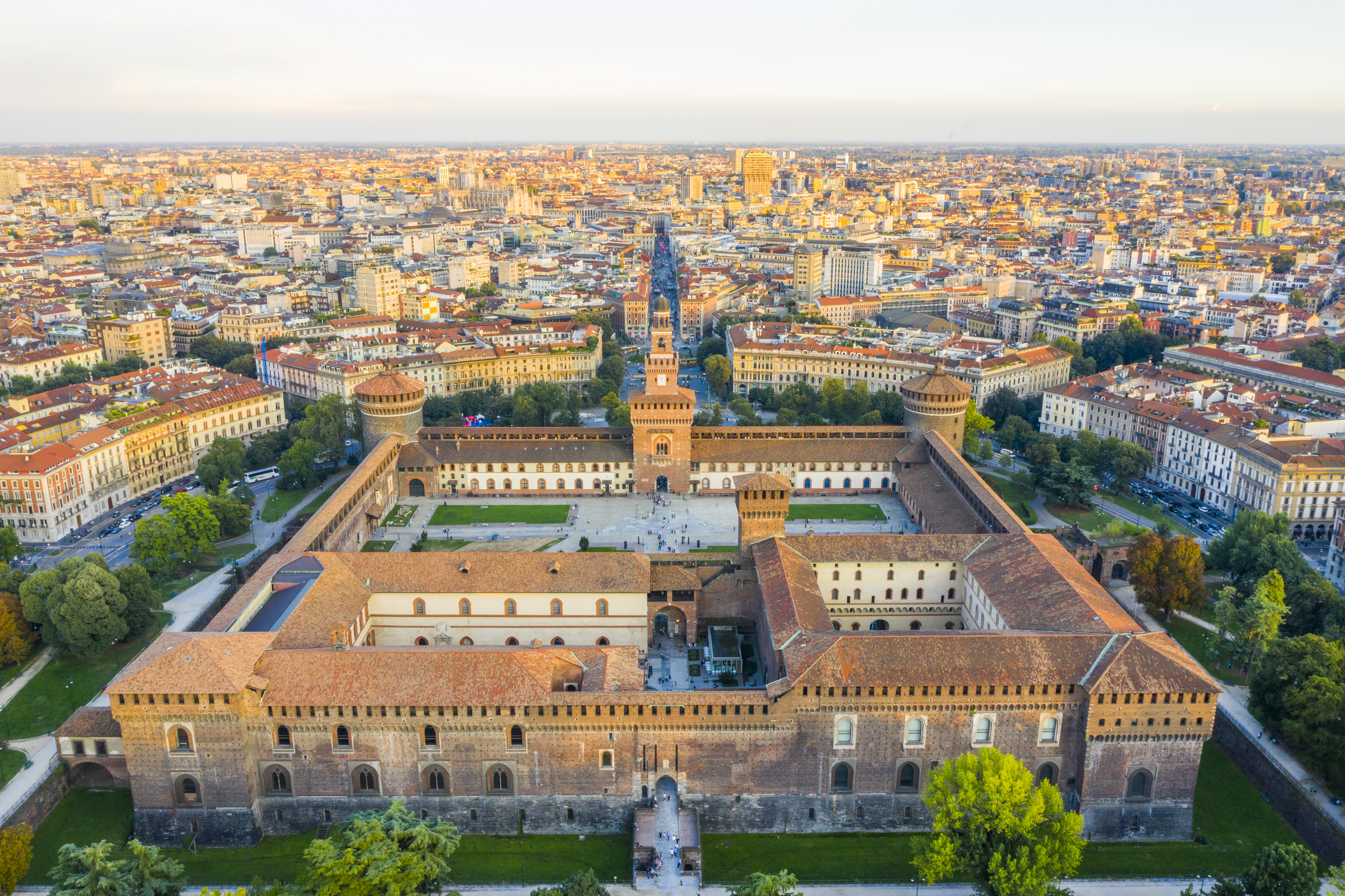
Sforza Castle in Milan, where Pietro Barsanti was shot

Prime Minister Giovanni Lanza proposed to the monarch not to receive the marquise, who had come specifically from Florence, and King Victor Emmanuel II accepted the suggestion. This attitude displeased the noblewoman and her husband, sharing the disappointment, returned to the king the collar of the Annunziata which he had been awarded. On 27 August of the same year, taken before the firing squad, Barsanti refused religious comfort from the chaplains and did not deny his republican faith. Blindfolded and sitting with a cigar between his teeth, he was shot at the age of 21 in the Sforzesco Castle in Milan. Pernice, who became insane in prison, committed suicide a few years later.

== Aftermath ==
Barsanti's shooting aroused indignation on the part of the republican and anarchist fringes. The Il Gazzettino Rosa, newspaper of Achille Bizzoni and Felice Cavallotti, railed against the monarchy and Cavallotti himself composed an ode in honor of the executed man. Giuseppe Mazzini, who learned of his death during his imprisonment in Gaeta after a failed insurrection attempt, praised the young soldier for his martyrdom. Furthermore, numerous republican and internationalist circles arose that bore his name. Pietro Barsanti is considered the first martyr of the modern Italian Republic and a symbol of republican ideals in Italy.

== See also ==
- 1946 Italian institutional referendum
- Capture of Rome
- History of the Italian Republic

== Sources ==
- Lodolini, Elio (1964), "BARSANTI, Pietro", Dizionario Biografico degli Italiani (in Italian), vol. VI, Rome: Treccani
