= Massimo Franco =

Italian journalist (born 1954)

- Born: November 6, 1954 (age 71)
- Occupations: Journalist, author, editor
- Spouse: Ilaria Angeli
- Children: 3

Massimo Franco (6 November 1954) is an Italian journalist, author, and member of the editorial board for the Italian newspaper Corriere della Sera.

== Biography ==
Born in Rome, Franco is a journalist for Corriere della Sera. He previously worked as a columnist for Avvenire, Il Giorno, and Panorama. He is a member of the International Institute for Strategic Studies (IISS) in London. He writes regularly for Limes, the French magazine Études, and bimonthly in the Los Angeles Times. Until 2011, he was a Vatican commentator at The Guardian.

== Personal life ==
Franco is married to Ilaria Angeli. His wife is the co-owner with his brother Stefano of the publishing house Franco Angeli. They have three children and live in Rome.
