= Semestre bianco =

Italian term for the last six months of a President's term of office

The semestre bianco (in English, "white semester") is an Italian legislative term referring to the last six months of the President of Italy's seven-year term of office. According to Article 88 of the Italian Constitution, the President cannot dissolve the Italian Parliament and call a new election during the last six months of their term. The prohibition was initially absolute. However, a constitutional amendment was passed in November 1991 creating an exception in cases where the normal five-year term of the parliament ends during the last six months of the President's term. The 1991 amendment came about when Francesco Cossiga's term as president was due to expire on 3 July 1992, only one day after the natural expiration of the 10th Italian Legislature (2 July 1992), thus leaving no one constitutionally empowered to call the next election.

The 2013 Italian general election on 24–25 February resulted in a hung parliament. By early April 2013, a government had still not been formed. President Giorgio Napolitano was by that time in the semestre bianco of his term and would have been unable to call a new election if it were needed to resolve the deadlock. However, on 20 April 2013, he agreed to run in the Italian presidential election, and was elected to an unprecedented second term, thus renewing his mandate to call a new election if necessary.
