= Guido De Ruggiero =

Italian politician

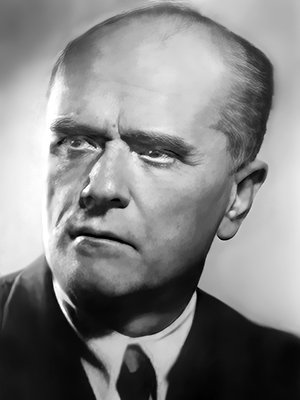
Guido De Ruggiero

Guido De Ruggiero (Naples, 23 March 1888 – Rome, 29 December 1948) was an Italian historian of philosophy, university professor, and politician.

== Biography ==
The son of Eugenio De Ruggiero and Filomena d'Aiello, he graduated in 1910 with a degree in Jurisprudence from the University of Naples Federico II. He was particularly well versed in Philosophy studies and was able to collaborate with specialized journals such as La Cultura, the Rivista di filosofia and Benedetto Croce, who favored the publication in 1912 of his first committed work, La filosofia contemporanea.

A contributor to Mario Missiroli'sil Resto del Carlino and Giuseppe Prezzolini La Voce (magazine), in 1914 he published in volume form the Critica del concetto di cultura, to which Croce reproached the failure to distinguish between culture and false culture. In philosophy, De Ruggiero was always an Idealism, a student initially of Gentile's Actual idealism, later coming closer to Croce without, however, adhering to his historicism, while in politics he was a Liberalism, although he did not spare criticism of the political class expressed by the Italian Liberal Party.

De Ruggiero taught history of philosophy first at the University of Messina(from 1923), then at the faculty of magistero at the Sapienza University of Rome(from 1925).

Having adhered to Idealism with Giovanni Gentile and later Benedetto Croce, his vindication with the latter of the values of liberalism made him a leading exponent of opposition to Fascism in intellectual circles. In November 1924 he joined Giovanni Amendola National Union (Italy, 1924); in 1925 he was among the signatories of the Manifesto of Anti-Fascist Intellectuals, drafted by Benedetto Croce. In order not to lose his university professorship, he took the oath of allegiance to fascism in 1931, but this did not prevent him from being dismissed from teaching a few years later (1942) and then arrested. He was freed at the Fall of the Fascist regime in Italy(July 1943).

He later served as rector of the University of Rome from 1943 to 1944. His political commitment was manifested in the Action Party (Italy), which he was among the first to join. He held the post of minister of education in the Second Bonomi government(1944) and was later appointed deputy of the National Council (Italy) (June–September 1945).

He was the author, among other works, of an impressive 13-volume History of Philosophy, published between 1918 and 1948, and a History of European Liberalism published in 1925, both at Laterza.

He also served as general president of the Corpo Nazionale Giovani Esploratori ed Esploratrici Italiani(CNGEI).

He died in Rome on December 29, 1948. He is buried in the aristocratic chapel in Brusciano, the place of origin of the De Ruggiero family. On his tomb it is possible to read the epitaph written by Benedetto Croce:

From the chair and through his writings he investigated
in the history of thought the power of freedom
world-builder of men, and, wishing
in dark times the return to reason,
was to the new generations of Italy
teacher and apostle of faith in humanity.

== Works ==
De Ruggiero taught history of philosophy first at the University of Messina (from 1923) and later at the University of Rome (from 1925).

De Ruggiero was friendly to socialism, though not a socialist himself. He believed liberals should be open to collectivism. De Ruggiero denounced both Bolshevik and laissez faire ideas while embracing the trade unions. He endorsed Mario Missiroli’s argument that the Socialist Party was the true inheritor of historical liberalism and that liberal ideology had the potential to be a revolutionary force in post-war Italy.

Having acceded to the idealism of Giovanni Gentile and Benedetto Croce, his assertion of the values of liberalism made him a leading exponent of the resistance to Fascism. In 1925 he was among the signatories of the Manifesto of the Anti-Fascist Intellectuals, written by Benedetto Croce. He was dismissed from teaching in 1942, arrested and released only on 25 July 1943.

He was one of the founders of the anti-fascist Action Party. Later he was rector of the University of Rome from 1943 to 1944 and subsequently held the post of Minister of Public Education in the government of Ivanoe Bonomi (1944).

He was author, among other works, of an impressive history of philosophy in 13 volumes, published between 1918 and 1948, and The History of European Liberalism published in 1925, both at Laterza. One particularly notable volume by De Ruggiero is his book Existentialism: The Philosophy of Existence as it comprehensively dissects this philosophy with an even balance of exposition and analysis. It clarifies the tenets of each Existentialist thinker and provides an invaluable critique of the movement as a whole. De Ruggiero states: "I believe the time has come to draw up some kind of provisional judgement on the so-called philosophy of existence, in order to bring it back within the confines of reality."

== Publications ==
- Modern Philosophy. Translated by A. Howard Hannay; R. G. Collingwood. London and New York: G. Allen & Unwin, ltd. and Macmillan. 1921.
- The History of European Liberalism. Translated by R. G. Collingwood. London: Oxford University Press. 1927 – via Internet Archive.
