= Stefano Jacini (politician, born 1886) =

Italian politician (1886–1952)

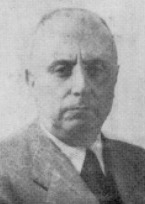
- Jacini in 1946

Minister of War
- In office 21 June 1945 – 24 November 1945
- Preceded by: Alessandro Casati
- Succeeded by: Manlio Brosio

Constituent Assembly
- In office 15 June 1946 – 31 January 1948

Senator
- In office 18 April 1948 – 31 May 1952

Member of the Chamber of Deputies
- In office 1 December 1919 – 9 November 1926

Count Stefano Jacini of San Gervasio (3 November 1886 – 31 May 1952) was an Italian politician and historian, a leading figure of the Christian Democrats.

== Family and early career ==
Stefano Jacini was the eldest of the six children born to Giovanni Battista Jacini and his wife Carolina Cavi. He was named after his grandfather, Risorgimento politician Stefano Jacini who had served several times as Minister of Public Works. The younger Stefano graduated in law from the University of Genoa in 1908. The following year he married Elisabetta Borromeo Arese, daughter of it:Giberto Borromeo Arese, prince of Angera, with whom he had his son Giovanni, later a professor of chemistry in Milan.

Young Stefano was strongly influenced by Piero Martinetti, whose university lectures he attended, and by his spiritual mentor Ambrogio Ratti, the future Pope Pius XI. After graduating, he contributed to a short-lived literary-religious magazine, it:Il Rinnovamento, along with it:Tommaso Gallarati Scotti, Alessandro Casati, Ajax Antonio Alfieri and Uberto Pestalozza. His family's friendship with bishop Geremia Bonomelli also brought him into contact with the initiatives of the Association for Assistance to Emigrants, making him an expert in the complex problems linked to emigration.

== Entry into politics ==
Jacini’s initial venture into public life came in January 1911, with his election as a municipal councilor of Milan. Unsuccessful in seeking re-election in June 1914, he was soon after elected provincial councilor for the Vimercate district. He also joined the editorial board of L'Italia, Milan’s main Catholic newspaper.

At the outbreak of the First World War he initially favoured neutrality but changed his view and supported the fight against Austria-Hungary as a means of completing Italian unification. He was called up as a reserve officer in the cavalry and assigned to the Civil Affairs office established at the supreme command. After the defeat of Caporetto he served at Montello as a liaison officer between the Italian forces and the British XIV Army Corps. During the war he obtained a medal and two war crosses for valor, as well as a British decoration. After demobilisation he returned to public life, joining Luigi Sturzo in establishing the Italian People's Party. He consistently supported a moderate conservative line.

== First parliamentary career ==
Jacini was first elected to the Chamber of Deputies in November 1919 for the Como constituency. He was re-elected in 1921 and 1924. He did not support the Aventine Secession, believing in the importance of maintaining the integrity of parliament. Despite his views he took part in opposition initiatives to restore democratic governance. He hoped that Vittorio Emanuele III would lead the country in this direction and was among the 54 signatories of the message addressed to the king, on 6 June 1925, by the constitutional deputies of the opposition. Disappointed by the king’s inaction, he continued to push for the opposition to return to Parliament.

Jacini took part in the attempt to return to the chamber on 16 January 1926; like the other deputies on that day, he was subjected to acts of violence by fascists, suffering an injury to his nose. On 9 November he was declared to have forfeited his elected mandate, along with the other Aventine deputies, and this brought his political career to an end for the time being. For the next few years he dedicated himself to study and writing, publishing a biography of his grandfather and maintaining contacts with other leading anti-fascist Catholics, and took part with Alcide de Gasperi in clandestine meetings preparing the reconstitution of a Catholic democratic party. Called up during the Second World War, as a staff officer, he was sent to the Western Front and then to Albania. After the Badoglio Proclamation he fled to Switzerland, returning to Italy in December 1944.

== Postwar period ==
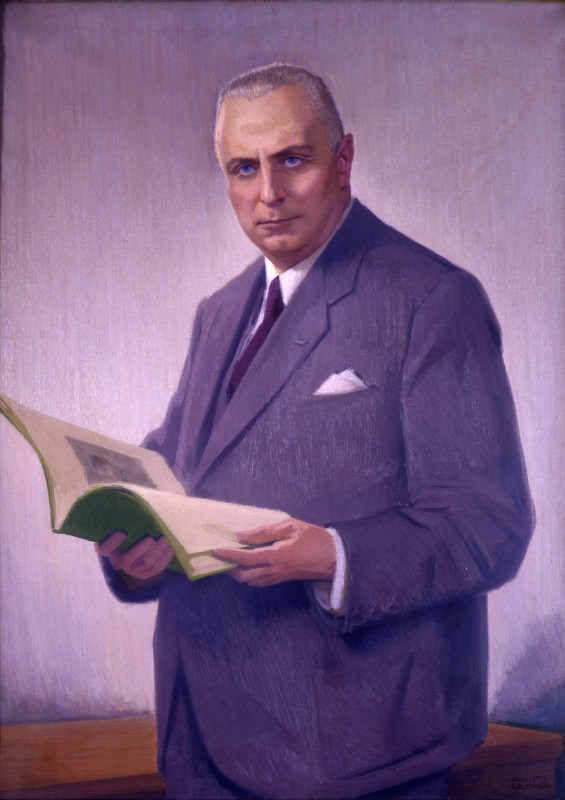
Artgate Fondazione Cariplo - Colombo Augusto, portrait of Count Stefano Jacini (1953)

After returning to Italy at the request of the third Bonomi government he went to Rome, where was appointed member of the National Council and Minister of War in the Parri government. In 1945 he was invited to chair the first national committee of the Christian Democrat party.

During the referendum on the monarchy Jacini campaigned in favor of keeping it, however at the first party congress in Rome in April 1946, his position was clearly in the minority. He was later elected to the Constituent Assembly of Italy and subsequently became a Senator for life. In the Senate he was president of the Foreign Affairs Commission. His last speech was in support of a report on 15 March 1952 on the ratification of the treaty establishing the European Coal and Steel Community.

Jacini was Ambassador Extraordinaire to Argentina in 1947, Italian representative to UNESCO in 1947 and then president of UNESCO’s Executive Council in 1950-1951, President of the Senate Foreign Affairs Commission from 1948 until his death and Vice President of the Council of Europe from 1949 until his death.

A supporter of various cultural institutions, he was a member of the Italian Bibliographic Society from 1911. After the Second World War he was involved in the re-foundation of the Italian Library Association. He was also an effective member of the Lombard Institute and president of the Cassa di Risparmio delle Provincie Lombarde. He was, for Mondadori, translator into Italian of the novel All Quiet on the Western Front.

== Selected works ==
- Un conservatore rurale della nuova Italia (“ A Rural Conservative of the New Italy ”) Bari, Laterza, 1926
- Il tramonto del potere temporale (“The Decline of Secular Power”) Bari, Laterza, 1931
- Storia del Partito Popolare Italiano (“History of the Italian People’s Party”) Milano, Garzanti Editore, 1951
