= Ministry of the Colonies (Italy) =

Former ministry of Italy (1912–1946)

Minister of the Colonies
- Ministro per l'Africa Italiana
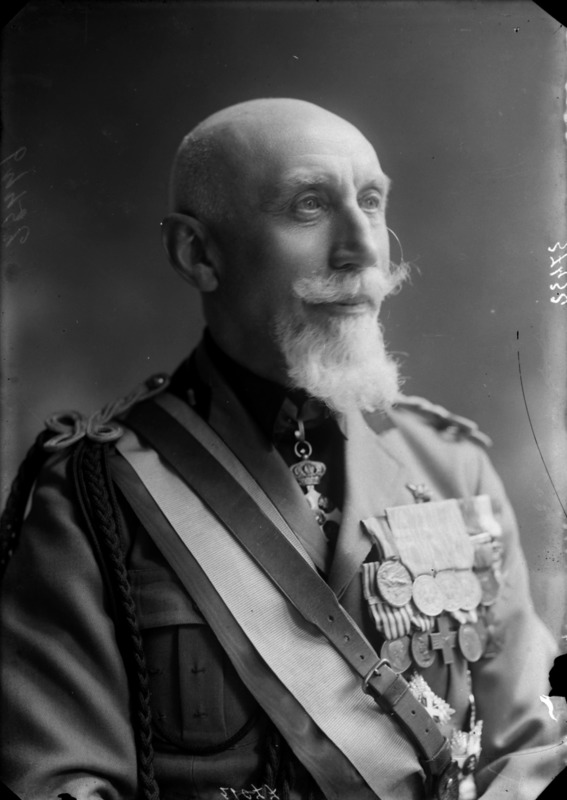
- Longest serving Emilio De Bono (12 September 1929 – 17 January 1935)
- Ministry of the Colonies
- Status: Abolished
- Constituting instrument: Royal Decree n. 1205
- Precursor: Central Direction of Colonial Affairs
- Formation: 21 November 1912
- First holder: Pietro Bertolini
- Final holder: Alcide De Gasperi
- Abolished: 19 April 1953

The Ministry of the Colonies (Ministero delle colonie) was the ministry of the government of the Kingdom of Italy responsible for the governing of the country's colonial possessions and the direction of their economies. It was set up on 20 November 1912 by Royal Decree n. 1205, turning the Central Direction of Colonial Affairs within the Ministry for Foreign Affairs into a separate ministry. Royal Decree n. 431 of 8 April 1937 renamed it the Ministry of Italian Africa (Ministro per l'Africa italiana) after the Second Italo-Ethiopian War, which resulted in the Italian annexation of the Ethiopian Empire and the birth of Italian East Africa. It was suppressed on 19 April 1953 by law n. 430.

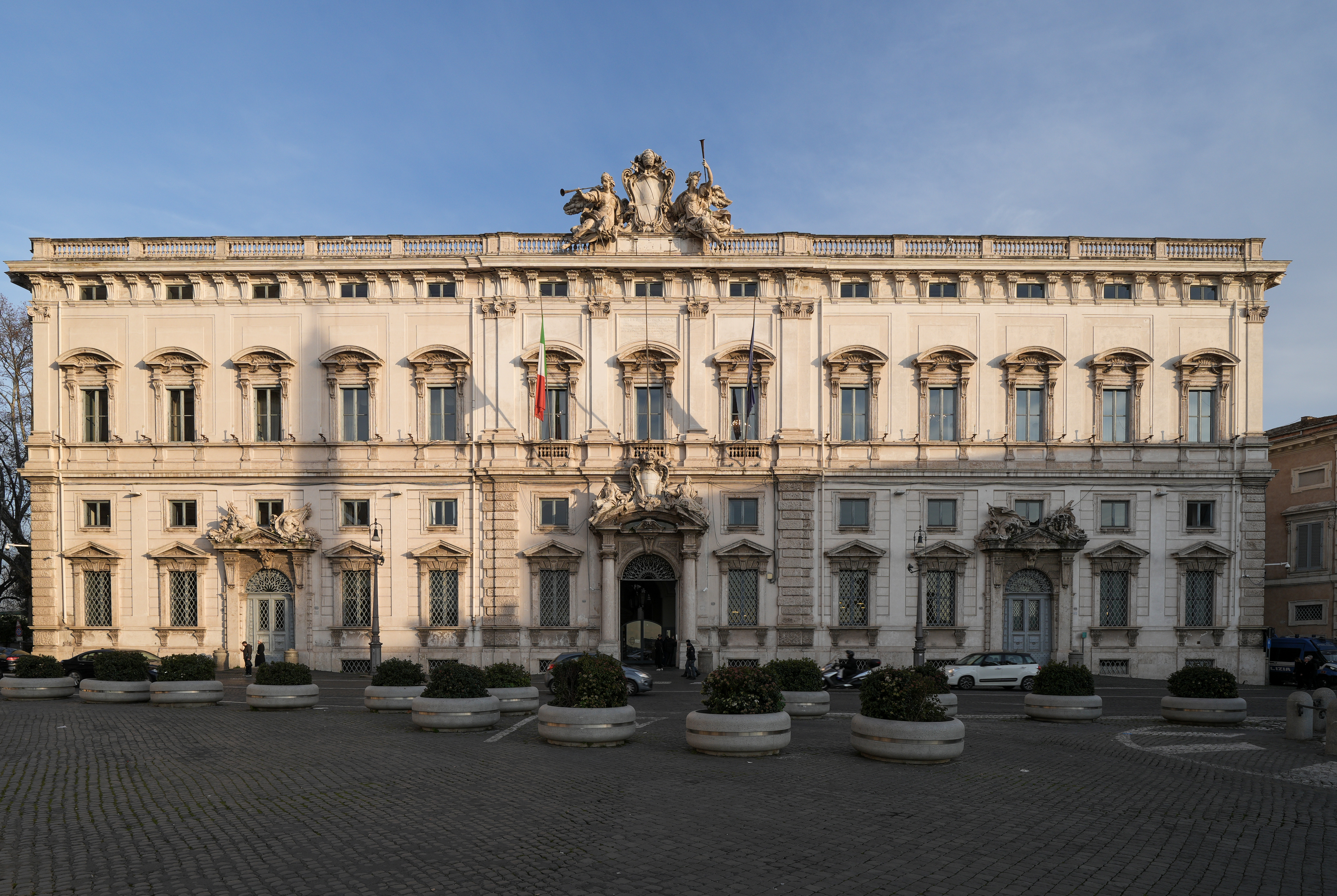
The office of the Ministry of the colonies from 1924 to 1953 . Palazzo della Consulta (Rome)

== List of ministers ==
No.	Portrait	Name (Birth–Death)	Term of office			Political party	Government	Ref.
No.	Portrait	Name (Birth–Death)	Took office	Left office	Time in office	Political party	Government	Ref.
Minister of the Colonies
1		Pietro Bertolini (1859–1920)	21 November 1912	21 March 1914	1 year, 120 days	Liberal Union	Giolitti IV	
2		Ferdinando Martini (1841–1928)	21 March 1914	18 June 1916	2 years, 89 days	Liberal Union	Salandra I–II	
3		Gaspare Colosimo (1859–1944)	18 June 1916	23 June 1919	3 years, 5 days	Liberal Union	Boselli; Orlando	
4		Luigi Rossi (1867–1941)	23 June 1919	14 March 1920	265 days	Italian Radical Party	Nitti I	
–		Francesco Saverio Nitti (1868–1953); Acting	14 March 1920	21 May 1920	68 days	Italian Radical Party	Nitti I	
5		Meuccio Ruini (1867–1941)	21 May 1920	15 June 1920	25 days	Italian Radical Party	Nitti II	
(4)		Luigi Rossi (1867–1941)	15 June 1920	4 July 1921	1 year, 19 days	Italian Radical Party	Giolitti V	
6		Giuseppe Girardini (1856–1923)	4 July 1921	26 February 1922	237 days	Social Democracy	Bonomi I	
7		Giovanni Amendola (1882–1926)	26 February 1922	30 October 1922	246 days	Democratic Liberal Party	Facta I–II	
8		Luigi Federzoni (1878–1967)	26 February 1922	3 June 1924	2 years, 98 days	Nationalist Association	Mussolini	
9		Pietro Lanza di Scalea (1863–1938)	3 June 1924	6 November 1926	2 years, 156 days	National Fascist Party	Mussolini	
(8)		Luigi Federzoni (1878–1967)	6 November 1926	18 December 1928	42 days	National Fascist Party	Mussolini	
–		Benito Mussolini (1883–1945); Acting	18 December 1928	12 September 1929	268 days	National Fascist Party	Mussolini	
10		Emilio De Bono (1866–1944)	12 September 1929	17 January 1935	5 years, 127 days	National Fascist Party	Mussolini	
–		Benito Mussolini (1883–1945); Acting	17 January 1935	11 June 1936	1 year, 146 days	National Fascist Party	Mussolini	
11		Alessandro Lessona (1891–1991)	11 June 1936	8 April 1937	301 days	National Fascist Party	Mussolini	
Minister of Italian Africa
(11)		Alessandro Lessona (1891–1991)	8 April 1937	20 November 1937	226 days	National Fascist Party	Mussolini	
12		Benito Mussolini (1883–1945)	20 November 1937	31 October 1939	1 year, 345 days	National Fascist Party	Mussolini	
13		Attilio Teruzzi (1882–1950)	31 October 1939	25 July 1943	3 years, 267 days	National Fascist Party	Mussolini	
14		Melchiade Gabba (1874–1952)	27 July 1943	11 February 1944	199 days	Independent	Badoglio I	–
–		Pietro Badoglio (1871–1956); Acting	11 February 1944	8 June 1944	118 days	Independent	Badoglio I–II	–
–		Ivanoe Bonomi (1873–1951); Acting	18 June 1944	21 June 1945	1 year, 13 days	Labour Democratic Party	Bonomi II–III	–
16		Ferruccio Parri (1890–1981)	21 June 1945	8 December 1945	170 days	Action Party	Parri	
17		Alcide De Gasperi (1881–1954)	10 December 1945	19 April 1953	7 years, 132 days	Christian Democracy	De Gasperi I–II–III–IV–V–VI–VII	
