= Third Bonomi government =

63rd Government of Kingdom of Italy

Bonomi III government
- 63rd Cabinet of Italy

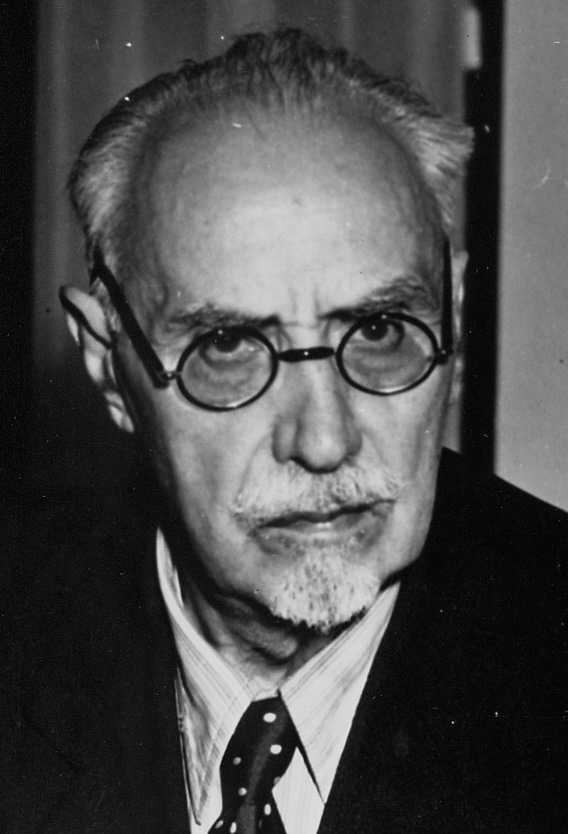
- Date formed: 12 December 1944
- Date dissolved: 21 June 1945

People and organisations
- Head of state: Victor Emmanuel III
- Head of government: Ivanoe Bonomi
- Total no. of members: 16
- Member party: DC, PCI, PLI, PDL

History
- Predecessor: Bonomi II Cabinet
- Successor: Parri Cabinet

The Bonomi III government of Italy held office from 12 December 1944 until 21 June 1945, a total of 190 days, or 6 months and 10 days.

== Government parties ==
The government was composed by the following parties:

Party	Ideology	Leader
Christian Democracy	Christian democracy	Alcide De Gasperi
Italian Communist Party	Communism	Palmiro Togliatti
Italian Liberal Party	Liberalism	Benedetto Croce
Labour Democratic Party	Social democracy	Ivanoe Bonomi

== Composition ==
Office	Name	Party	Term
Prime Minister	Ivanoe Bonomi	Labour Democratic Party	(1944–1945)
Deputy Prime Minister	Palmiro Togliatti	Italian Communist Party	(1944–1945)
Deputy Prime Minister	Giulio Rodinò	Christian Democracy	(1944–1945)
Minister of the Interior	Ivanoe Bonomi	Labour Democratic Party	(1944–1945)
Minister of Foreign Affairs	Alcide De Gasperi	Christian Democracy	(1944–1945)
Minister of Grace and Justice	Umberto Tupini	Christian Democracy	(1944–1945)
Minister of Finance	Antonio Pesenti	Italian Communist Party	(1944–1945)
Minister of Treasury	Marcello Soleri	Italian Liberal Party	(1944–1945)
Minister of War	Alessandro Casati	Italian Liberal Party	(1944–1945)
Minister of the Navy	Raffaele de Courten	Military	(1944–1945)
Minister of the Air Force	Carlo Scialoja	Labour Democratic Party	(1944–1945)
Minister of the Air Force	Luigi Gasparotto	Labour Democratic Party	(1945–1945)
Minister of Industry and Commerce	Giovanni Gronchi	Christian Democracy	(1944–1945)
Minister of Public Works	Meuccio Ruini	Labour Democratic Party	(1944–1945)
Minister of Agriculture and Forests	Fausto Gullo	Italian Communist Party	(1944–1945)
Minister of Public Education	Vincenzo Arangio-Ruiz	Italian Liberal Party	(1944–1945)
Minister of Public Education	Umberto Ricci	Italian Liberal Party	(1945)
Minister of Transport	Francesco Cerabona	Labour Democratic Party	(1944–1945)
Minister of Post and Telecommunications	Mario Cevolotto	Labour Democratic Party	(1944–1945)
Minister of Italian Africa	Ivanoe Bonomi	Labour Democratic Party	(1944–1945)
Minister of Occupied Italy	Mauro Scoccimarro	Italian Communist Party	(1944–1945)
Secretary of the Council of Ministers	Giuseppe Spataro	Christian Democracy	(1944–1945)
Secretary of the Council of Ministers	Francesco Libonati	Italian Liberal Party	(1944–1945)
