= Francesco Cerabona =

Italian politician (1882–1963)

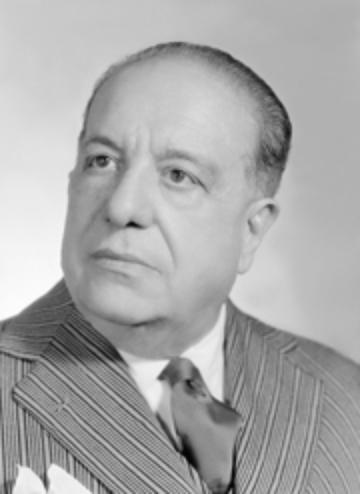

Minister of Communications of the Kingdom of Italy
- In office 24 April 1944 – 12 December 1944
- Preceded by: Tommaso Siciliani
- Succeeded by: Mario Cevolotto

Minister of Transport of the Kingdom of Italy
- In office 12 December 1944 – 21 June 1945
- Preceded by: office created
- Succeeded by: Ugo La Malfa

Member of the Chamber of Deputies of the Kingdom of Italy
- In office 1 December 1919 – 25 January 1924

Member of the Italian National Council
- In office 25 September 1945 – 1 June 1946

Member of the Chamber of Deputies of the Italian Republic
- In office 8 May 1948 – 24 June 1953

Member of the Senate of the Italian Republic
- In office 25 June 1953 – 15 May 1963

Personal details
- Born: 9 December 1882 Aliano, Kingdom of Italy
- Died: 26 July 1963 (aged 80) Naples, Italy
- Party: Italian Socialist Party; Labour Democratic Party

Francesco Cerabona (9 December 1882 – 26 July 1963) was an Italian politician, who served as Minister of Communications of the Kingdom of Italy in the Badoglio II and Bonomi II Cabinets, and as Minister of Transport in the Bonomi III Cabinet.

== Biography ==
Born in the province of Matera, Cerabona had graduated in law and worked as a lawyer. Having joined the Italian Socialist Party, he ran without success in the 1913 elections but was elected to the Italian Chamber of Deputies in 1919 and again in 1921.

After the twenty-year "pause" imposed by the Fascist regime, he returned to politics in 1943, with the Labour Democratic Party, and was appointed Minister of Communications in the Badoglio II Cabinet, from April to June 1944, and confirmed in this post by the subsequent Bonomi II Cabinet, from June to December 1944.

When the Ministry of Transport, which had been suppressed and merged into the Ministry of Public Works in 1920, was re-established under the Bonomi III Cabinet, Cerabona was given this post, from December 1944 to June 1945; in this capacity he had to deal with the reconstruction of the Italian railway network, severely damaged by the war.

After the war, having returned to the Italian Socialist Party, he was a member of the Italian National Council and was then elected to the Chamber of Deputies of the Italian Republic in 1948 and to the Senate in 1953 and again in 1958. He died in 1963, shortly after the end of his second term in the Senate.
