= Giuseppe Girardini =

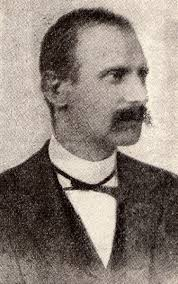

Minister of the Colonies
- In office 4 July 1921 – 26 February 1922
- Prime Minister: Ivanoe Bonomi
- Preceded by: Luigi Rossi
- Succeeded by: Giovanni Amendola

Interim Minister of Military Assistance and War Pensions
- In office 18 January 1919 – 23 June 1919
- Prime Minister: Vittorio Emanuele Orlando
- Preceded by: Vittorio Italico Zupelli
- Succeeded by: it:Ugo Da Como

Deputy
- In office 23 November 1892 – 21 October 1923

Giuseppe Girardini (Udine, 14 April 1856 – Tricesimo, 21 October 1923 ) was an Italian lawyer and politician.

== Early life and political career ==
The son of Felice Girardini and Luigia Peressini, he lost his father at the age of 6. He graduated in law in Rome in 1880, and founded the Friulian branch of the Radical Party in Udine, which had the weekly Il Paese as its press organ. First was elected deputy for the Udine constituency in a by-election, he went on to serve in 7 legislatures, between 1893-1895 and 1897-1923.

Politically, Girardini kept himself apart from coalition of deputies who were happy to support the liberal leader, Giovanni Giolitti. Girardini was harshly critical of the clientelism, corruption associated with Giolitti. However, he welcomed the 1911 invasion of Libya, which he saw as the culmination Italian unification. Concerned by the potential sudden influx of politically inexperienced voters, he was unenthusiastic about proposals to introduce of universal manhood suffrage. He also enthusiastically supported Italy’s entry into the First World War on the side of the Allies.

Throughout his career, Girardini retained a strong interest in the affairs of his native region. In the post-war period he fought for the recognition and preservation of the ethnic, linguistic, historical and geographical unity of Friuli, and against subsuming it in some larger and less distinctive entity such as Friuli-Venezia Giulia.

== Government career ==
From 18 January 1919 to 23 June 1919 he held the position of interim Minister for military assistance and war pensions, under the Orlando Government; under the Bonomi Government he was Minister of the Colonies, from July 1921 to February 1922. In Libya he was instrumental, together with the governor of Tripolitania, Giuseppe Volpi, in securing the occupation of the port of Misrata, the first step in the reconquest of Libya that was completed during the fascist period.

== Relationship with fascism ==
Girardini was a Freemason. In the troubled postwar period, he felt growing concern over the rise of the Popular and Socialist parties. He believed that the new mass movements were mobilising people against proper national sentiments. When the fascist movement began to spread in Friuli, he immediately showed a certain sympathy towards it, seeing in it a possible restorer of order after the so-called Biennio Rosso. On November 17, 1922, Girardini, elected for the final time and sitting as a deputy for the Social Democracy, voted in support of Mussolini's prime ministership in a vote of confidence. In July 1923, he supported the Acerbo Law. His speech on the Acerbo Law, his last in the Chamber, earned him an honorary membership card from the National Fascist Party, presented to him, on the orders of Mussolini, by the fascists of Udine.

A bust of Giuseppe Girardini, sculpted in 1934 by it:Mario Ceconi di Montececon, is located in Udine, in Piazza Patriarcato.

== Honours ==
Knight Grand Cross of the Colonial Order of the Star of Italy - ribbon for ordinary uniform

Knight Grand Cross of the Colonial Order of the Star of Italy
— Royal decree of 27 November 1921.
