= National Union (Italy, 1924) =

National Union Unione Nazionale
- Leader: Giovanni Amendola
- Founded: 8 November 1924
- Dissolved: 6 November 1926
- Ideology: Liberalism; Anti-fascism

The National Union (Unione Nazionale) was an anti-fascist political party founded by Giovanni Amendola in the aftermath of the Giacomo Matteotti murder (10 June 1924) and the Aventinian secession (26 June 1924).

== History ==
On 8 November 1924, at the impulse of the liberal-democratic leader Giovanni Amendola, a group of anti-fascist politicians, professionals and intellectuals met to form a political association representing those principles of freedom and democracy, "the foundation of Unification of Italy and the struggles of the Risorgimento, prevaricated and persecuted by the rising fascist regime". The National Union had been preceded by a series of regional unions including the Southern Union (Unione Meridionale), founded by Amendola himself in Naples on 21 May 1924. In the elections of 1924, the party, presented in the form of regional lists, won 8 seats (all in the southern Italy).

The new political party, called the "National Union of Liberal and Democratic Forces", was joined by personalities from different political backgrounds such as the liberal-democrats Nello Rosselli and Luigi Einaudi, radicals like Giulio Alessio, social democrats like Ivanoe Bonomi, Meuccio Ruini and Luigi Salvatorelli, independents like Carlo Sforza, and, later, republicans like the young Ugo La Malfa. Among the signatories of the document there were eleven deputies, sixteen former deputies and eleven senators, who formed a political group.

In June 1925, the movement held its first (and only) Congress in Rome; later changed its name to "National Democratic Union".

On 20 July 1925 Giovanni Amendola was attacked by a fascist squads in the locality of La Colonna in Pieve a Nievole (in the province of Pistoia) and never recovered from the aggression: he died in Cannes on 7 April 1926 and the National Union itself did not outlive its leader. On 6 November 1926, the National Fascist Party was proclaimed the only legal party in Italy and the National Union was dissolved.
