= Pietro Amendola =

Italian politician and journalist (1918–2007)

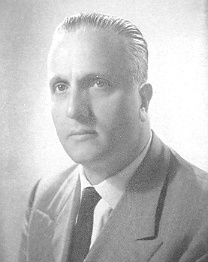

Member of the Chamber of Deputies
- In office 1948–1968

Personal details
- Born: Pietro Amendola; 26 October 1918 Rome, Italy
- Died: 7 December 2007 (aged 89) Rome, Italy

Pietro Amendola (26 October 1918 - 7 December 2007) was a communist Italian politician and journalist, who served in the Chamber of Deputies from 1948 until 1968. A war hero, and anti-fascist partisan, his father was Giovanni Amendola, a noted anti-fascist in the 1920s, and his brother, Giorgio, was also a communist politician.

== Biography ==
=== Early life ===
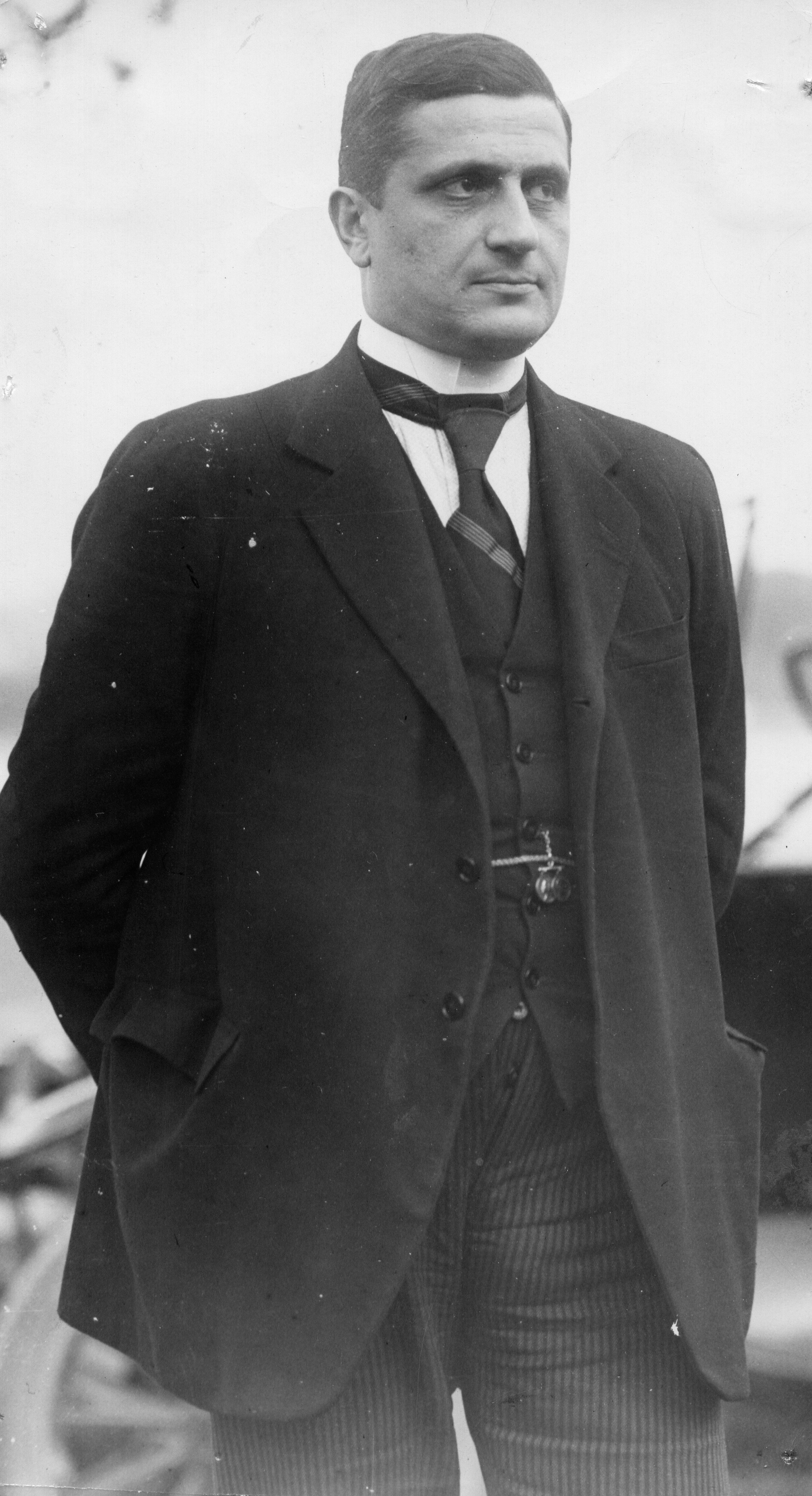
His father, Giovanni Amendola

Pietro Amendola was born in Rome in 1918. He was the youngest child of Italian politician, journalist, and noted anti-fascist, Giovanni Amendola. In 1937, he joined the Italian Communist Party (Italian: Partito Comunista Italiano, PCI) following the example of his older brother Giorgio. He graduated with a degree law in 1939. In 1940, at the age of 22, he ended up before the Special Fascist Court, where he was sentenced to 10 years in prison. Pietro only served 3 years in prison, as he was set free, thanks to the fall of fascism in Italy

==== Partisan activity ====
After leaving prison, Pietro immediately resumed his position in the anti-fascist struggle, becoming one of the organizers of the partisan resistance in Lazio, working in a formation of the Volunteer Corps of Freedom with the rank of captain.

=== Political career ===
After the end of World War II, Pietro became the secretary of the Communist Federation of Salerno in 1946 and later the president of the National Association of Partisans of Italy of Naples. In 1947, he became the editor of the Naples newspaper La Voce. In 1948 he was elected as a deputy on the PCI lists, and was re-elected for five legislatures, until 1968.

He continued his political activity, despite leaving the chamber of deputies. Becoming the president of the National Association of Persecuted Italian Anti-Fascists (ANPI), Founding and becoming president of the Tenants Syndicate, and remaining in the leadership of the National Association for Reconstruction of War Damage.

==== Last years ====
The last few years of his life, see him heavily involve himself in the transmission of historical memory. With him, together with his wife Lara, creating of the Matteotti Museum in Fratta Polesine.

=== Death ===
Pietro died in Rome in 2007, at the age of 89. His death was mourned, with former Prime Minister Romano Prodi sending condolences to Pietro's family, and the mayors of Rome and Naples each commenting on his death.

Whoever wrote that in Pietro Amendola's DNA was love for Italy, democracy and freedom. it is a piece of history of the country that is leaving ... I would like to remember his great interest in young people. Pietro said that his generation could appear to the children a little emphatic and preaching and for this it was necessary to 'meet the young people, understand them and make themselves understood.' Pietro met many Italian girls and boys, they, his loved ones, me and many others will miss him very much

— Walter Vetroni

The death of Pietro Amendola, the last of Giovanni's children, takes away the courageous and coherent heir of a cultural and political tradition which, also through Giorgio Amendola, he has given so much to the aspirations for freedom of our people and to the democratic institutions of the country.

— Rosa Russo Jervolino

== Personal life ==
Pietro married Lara Morticini, and together they have four children.

== Bibliography ==
- http://www.anrd-guerra.it/amendola
- https://www.anpi.it/donne-e-uomini/850/pietro-amendola
