= Second Bonomi government =

62nd Government of Kingdom of Italy

Bonomi II government
- 62nd Cabinet of Italy

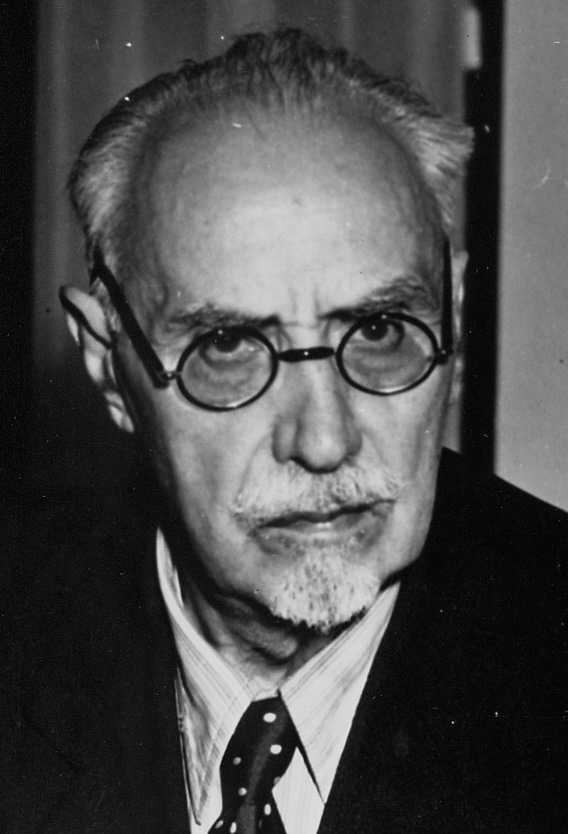
- Date formed: 18 June 1944
- Date dissolved: 12 December 1944

People and organisations
- Head of state: Victor Emmanuel III
- Head of government: Ivanoe Bonomi
- Total no. of members: 14
- Member party: DC, PCI, PLI, PSIUP, PdA, PDL

History
- Predecessor: Badoglio II Cabinet
- Successor: Bonomi III Cabinet

The Bonomi II government of Italy held office from 18 June until 12 December 1944, a total of 177 days, or 5 months and 27 days.

== Government parties ==
The government was composed by the following parties:

Party	Ideology	Leader
Christian Democracy	Christian democracy	Alcide De Gasperi
Italian Communist Party	Communism	Palmiro Togliatti
Italian Liberal Party	Liberalism	Benedetto Croce
Italian Socialist Party	Socialism	Pietro Nenni
Action Party	Liberal socialism	Ferruccio Parri
Labour Democratic Party	Social democracy	Ivanoe Bonomi

== Composition ==
Office	Name	Party	Term
Prime Minister	Ivanoe Bonomi	Labour Democratic Party	(1944–1944)
Minister of the Interior	Ivanoe Bonomi	Labour Democratic Party	(1944–1944)
Minister of Foreign Affairs	Ivanoe Bonomi	Labour Democratic Party	(1944–1944)
Minister of Grace and Justice	Umberto Tupini	Christian Democracy	(1944–1944)
Minister of Finance	Stefano Siglienti	Action Party	(1944–1944)
Minister of Treasury	Marcello Soleri	Italian Liberal Party	(1944–1944)
Minister of War	Alessandro Casati	Italian Liberal Party	(1944–1944)
Minister of the Navy	Raffaele de Courten	Military	(1944–1944)
Minister of the Air Force	Pietro Piacentini	Military	(1944–1944)
Minister of Industry and Commerce	Giovanni Gronchi	Christian Democracy	(1944–1944)
Minister of Public Works	Pietro Mancini	Italian Socialist Party	(1944–1944)
Minister of Agriculture and Forests	Fausto Gullo	Italian Communist Party	(1944–1944)
Minister of Public Education	Guido De Ruggiero	Action Party	(1944–1944)
Minister of Communications	Francesco Cerabona	Labour Democratic Party	(1944–1944)
Minister of Italian Africa	Ivanoe Bonomi	Labour Democratic Party	(1944–1944)
Secretary of the Council of Ministers	Sergio Fenoaltea	Action Party	(1944–1944)
Secretary of the Council of Ministers	Giuseppe Spataro	Christian Democracy	(1944–1944)
