= Umberto Ricci =

Italian academic and economist (1879–1946)

- Born: 20 February 1879; Chieti, Kingdom of Italy
- Died: 3 January 1946 (aged 66); Cairo, Kingdom of Egypt
- Title: Professor

Academic background
- Education: Ferdinando Galiani Technical-Commercial Institute; Ca' Foscari University of Venice

Academic work
- Discipline: Statistics; Economy
- Sub-discipline: Agricultural economics
- Institutions: University of Parma; University of Pisa; University of Macerata; University of Bologna; Sapienza University of Rome; Cairo University; Istanbul University

Umberto Ricci (1879–1946) was an Italian academic and economist who served as the minister of education in 1945 shortly after the end of the Fascist rule in Italy. He was a leading academic and worked at various universities.

== Early life and education ==
Ricci was born in Chieti on 20 February 1879. He obtained a diploma from the Ferdinando Galiani technical-commercial institute in Chieti. Then he graduated from the Higher School of Commerce in Venice (forerunner of the Ca' Foscari University) with a degree in political economy, finance, and statistics. His fields of specialty were agricultural economics and general equilibrium analysis.

== Career, activities and views ==
Following his graduation Ricci worked at the Ministry of Agriculture between 1907 and 1910. Then he joined the International Institute of Agriculture based in Rome and headed its statistics department from 1910. He published his first scholarly article in 1904 in the Journal of Economists. He was the professor of statistics at the universities of Parma (1915–1918) and Pisa (1919–1921) and professor of economics at universities of Macerata (1912), Bologna (1922–1924) and Rome (1924–1928). Following World War I Ricci was named as a member of the committee of technical experts, called the “commission for the revision of balances and the reduction of public expenditures”. He authored a book on Italian food policy during World War I. In addition to his academic activities, Ricci was also an active politician and became a member of the Liberal Party. Ricci published articles in La Voce, L'Unità and La Rivoluzione Liberale.

Ricci was an ally and advisor of Alberto de Stefani, minister of finance in the cabinet of Benito Mussolini. In March 1928 he was removed from his teaching post at the Italian universities due to his criticism of fascist economic policies. Then he left Italy and taught economics and statistics at Cairo University, Egypt, from October 1929 to 1940. In September 1942 he began to teach at Istanbul University, Turkey. There he stayed until 30 October 1945 when he returned to Italy. He was appointed minister of education in the Bonomi cabinet, replacing Vincenzo Arangio-Ruiz in the post.

== Death ==
After serving as the minister of education for a brief period, Ricci returned to Cairo, where he died of a heart attack on 3 January 1946. He was about to leave Egypt for Italy to resume his post at the Sapienza University of Rome.
