= Quinto Quintieri =

Italian engineer and banker (1894–1968)

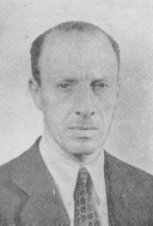

Minister of Treasury and Finance
- In office 22 April 1944 – 8 June 1944
- Prime Minister: Pietro Badoglio
- Preceded by: Guido Jung
- Succeeded by: Stefano Siglienti

Personal details
- Born: 12 August 1894 Sorrento, Kingdom of Italy
- Died: 23 December 1968 (aged 74) Geneva, Switzerland
- Party: Italian Liberal Party
- Education: University of Naples
- Occupation: Engineer; Banker

Quinto Quintieri (12 August 1894 – 23 December 1968) was an Italian engineer and banker. He briefly served as the minister of treasury and finance in 1944 shortly after the end of the Fascist rule in Italy.

== Early years and education ==
Quintieri was born in Sorrento on 12 August 1894. His family were from Carolei, a village in the Cosentino area. His father was a landowner and an academic who was the cofounder of the Bank of Calabria. He had four sisters. He received a degree in engineering from the University of Naples. Quintieri worked as a military instructor at the Academy of Turin during his studies in the period of World War I.

== Career and activities ==
Following his graduation, he worked at the Bank of Calabria and became its president after the death of his father. He was appointed minister of treasury and finance in the second Badoglio cabinet, which lasted only 47 days between 22 April 1944 and 8 June 1944. He was one of the three Calabrian representatives in the government. The others were Fausto Gullo and Pietro Mancini.

Quintieri started a newspaper entitled Il Giornale which folded in 1957 and a weekly La Libertà in June 1944. In 1944, he and another banker, Raffaele Mattioli, were assigned by Prime Minister Ivanoe Bonomi as the head of the Italian delegate which visited the US for potential economic support. In 1946, Quintieri was elected as a member to the Constituent Assembly for the Italian Liberal Party. He served there between 25 June 1946 and 31 January 1948. The assembly had the task of creating the Italian Constitution.

After retiring from politics in 1948 Quintieri resumed his post at the Bank of Calabria. He also became vice-president of Confindustria in 1949 and then president of the Union of Industrialists which included representations from the six countries of the European Coal and Steel Community.

== Personal life and death ==
Quintieri settled in Switzerland in 1957. He remained unmarried and died in Geneva, Switzerland, on 23 December 1968.

=== Honours ===
Quintieri was awarded the Knights of Labour in 1958.
