= Meuccio Ruini =

Italian politician (1877–1970)

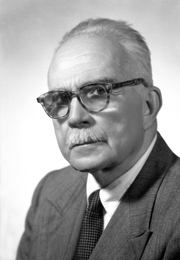
- Ruini c. 1948

President of the Italian Senate
- In office 25 March 1953 – 25 June 1953
- Preceded by: Giuseppe Paratore
- Succeeded by: Cesare Merzagora

Minister of the Colonies
- In office 21 May 1920 – 15 June 1920
- Preceded by: Luigi Rossi
- Succeeded by: Luigi Rossi

Personal details
- Born: Bartolomeo Ruini; 14 December 1877 Reggio Emilia, Italy
- Died: 6 March 1970 (aged 92) Rome, Italy
- Party: PSI (1904–1913); PR (1913–1922); UN (1924–1926); PDL (1942–1948); None (1948–1953)
- Education: University of Bologna
- Profession: Lawyer

Bartolomeo "Meuccio" Ruini (14 December 1877 – 6 March 1970) was an Italian jurist and socialist politician who served as the President of the Italian Senate and the Minister of the Colonies.

== Biography ==
After graduating in law from the University of Bologna, in 1903 he entered the administration of the Ministry of Public Works and, in 1912, became general manager of special services for the Southern Italy.

In 1904 he joined the Italian Socialist Party (PSI) and in 1907 he was elected municipal councilor in Rome and provincial councilor in Reggio Emilia. In 1913 he was elected deputy for the radical list in the constituency of Castelnovo Monti. In the same year he was appointed Councilor of State.

He took part in the debate on the Italian participation in the First World War on fiercely interventionist positions, and at the outbreak of the conflict he enlisted as a volunteer, deserving the praise of Francesco Saverio Nitti and General Armando Diaz and obtaining a silver medal for military valor. In 1917 he joined the Orlando government as undersecretary of industry, commerce and employment and held the post until 1921, also under the Nitti I government. In 1919 he was re-elected deputy for the radical list. In 1920 he briefly served as Minister of the Colonies in the Nitti II Cabinet.

Ruini was firmly against fascism and launched a campaign against the regime from the columns of the newspaper Il Mondo. In 1927 he was ousted from the Council of State, forced to abandon all political activities and returned to the private practices of advocacy and teaching.

In 1942 he founded in secret, with Ivanoe Bonomi, the Labour Democratic Party of which he was also secretary. At the fall of fascism he was among the promoters of the Committee of anti-fascist forces and then of the CLN. He was also part of the National Council.

He was Minister without portfolio in the Bonomi II Cabinet (June–December 1944) and Minister of public works in the Bonomi III Cabinet (December 1944–June 1945). He was then Minister for the reconstruction of the lands liberated by the enemy in the Parri Cabinet (June–December 1945). In the meantime, from January 1945, he became president of the Inter-ministerial Committee for Reconstruction and President of the Council of State.

On 2 June 1946 he was elected deputy to the Constituent Assembly, and became president of the "Commission of 75", charged with drafting the constitutional text. As it was confirmed by the former President of the Grand Orient of Italy, he was one of the eight father constituents belonging to the main Italian Masonic organization.

Under the third transitional and final provision of the Italian Constitution, Ruini, who had been a deputy for three legislatures without compromising fascism, became a senator by right of the first legislature of the Italian Republic and joined the mixed group.

On 24 March 1953 he was elected President of the Senate to replace Giuseppe Paratore, who resigned the previous day while the parliamentary obstruction of the opposition was underway to hinder the attempt by the majority to approve a contested electoral reform.

In 1957 he was appointed first president of the National Council for Economics and Labour, which he chaired until May 1959. On 2 March 1963 the President of the Republic Antonio Segni appointed him Senator for life "for having illustrated the country with very high scientific merits and social."
