= Second Badoglio government =

61st Government of Kingdom of Italy

Badoglio II government
- 61st Cabinet of Italy

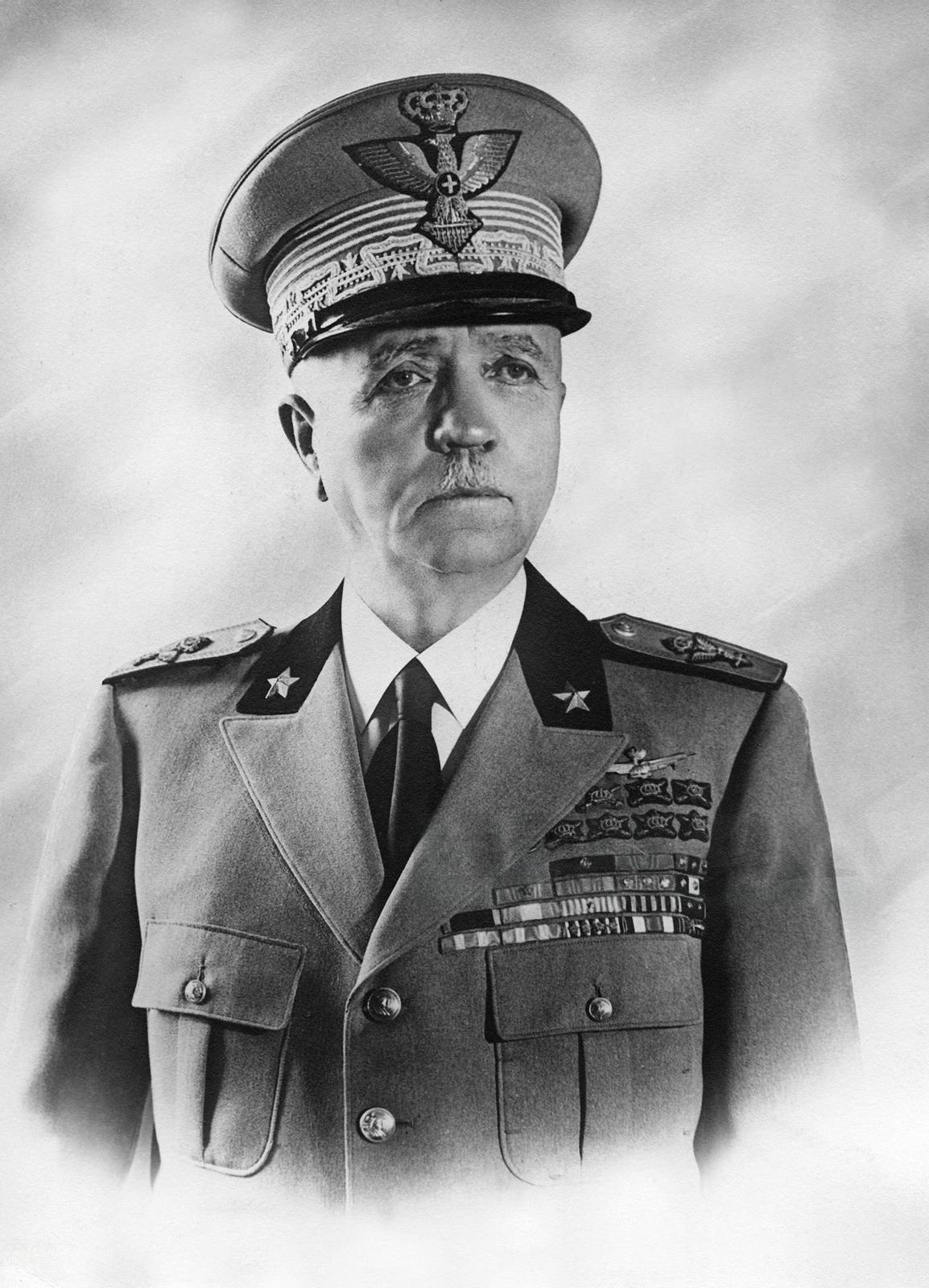
- Date formed: 22 April 1944
- Date dissolved: 18 June 1944

People and organisations
- Head of state: Victor Emmanuel III
- Head of government: Pietro Badoglio
- Total no. of members: 13
- Member party: DC, PCI, PLI, PSIUP, PdA, PDL

History
- Predecessor: Badoglio I Cabinet
- Successor: Bonomi II Cabinet

The Badoglio II government of Italy held office from 22 April until 18 June 1944, a total of 57 days, or 1 months and 27 days. It was the first government in Italian history with the presence of the socialists and the communists.

== Government parties ==
The government was composed by the following parties:

| Party | Ideology | Leader |
|---|---|---|
| Christian Democracy | Christian democracy | Alcide De Gasperi |
| Italian Communist Party | Communism | Palmiro Togliatti |
| Italian Liberal Party | Liberalism | Benedetto Croce |
| Italian Socialist Party | Socialism | Pietro Nenni |
| Action Party | Liberal socialism | Ferruccio Parri |
| Labour Democratic Party | Social democracy | Ivanoe Bonomi |

== Composition ==
| Office | Name | Party | Term |
|---|---|---|---|
| Prime Minister | Pietro Badoglio | Military | (1944–1944) |
| Deputy Prime Minister | Palmiro Togliatti | Italian Communist Party | (1944–1944) |
| Minister of the Interior | Salvatore Aldisio | Christian Democracy | (1944–1944) |
| Minister of Foreign Affairs | Pietro Badoglio | Military | (1944–1944) |
| Minister of Grace and Justice | Vincenzo Arangio-Ruiz | Italian Liberal Party | (1944–1944) |
| Minister of Treasury and Finance | Quinto Quintieri | Italian Liberal Party | (1944–1944) |
| Minister of War | Taddeo Orlando | Military | (1944–1944) |
| Minister of the Navy | Raffaele de Courten | Military | (1944–1944) |
| Minister of Air Force | Renato Sandalli | Military | (1944–1944) |
| Minister of Industry and Commerce | Attilio Di Napoli | Italian Socialist Party | (1944–1944) |
| Minister of Public Works | Alberto Tarchiani | Action Party | (1944–1944) |
| Minister of Agriculture and Forests | Fausto Gullo | Italian Communist Party | (1944–1944) |
| Minister of Public Education | Adolfo Omodeo | Action Party | (1944–1944) |
| Minister of Communications | Francesco Cerabona | Labour Democratic Party | (1944–1944) |
| Minister of Italian Africa | Pietro Badoglio | Military | (1944–1944) |
| Secretary of the Council of Ministers | Renato Morelli | Italian Liberal Party | (1944–1944) |
