= Ministry of Infrastructure and Transport (Italy) =

Government ministry of Italy

- Ministero delle Infrastrutture e dei Trasporti; MIT

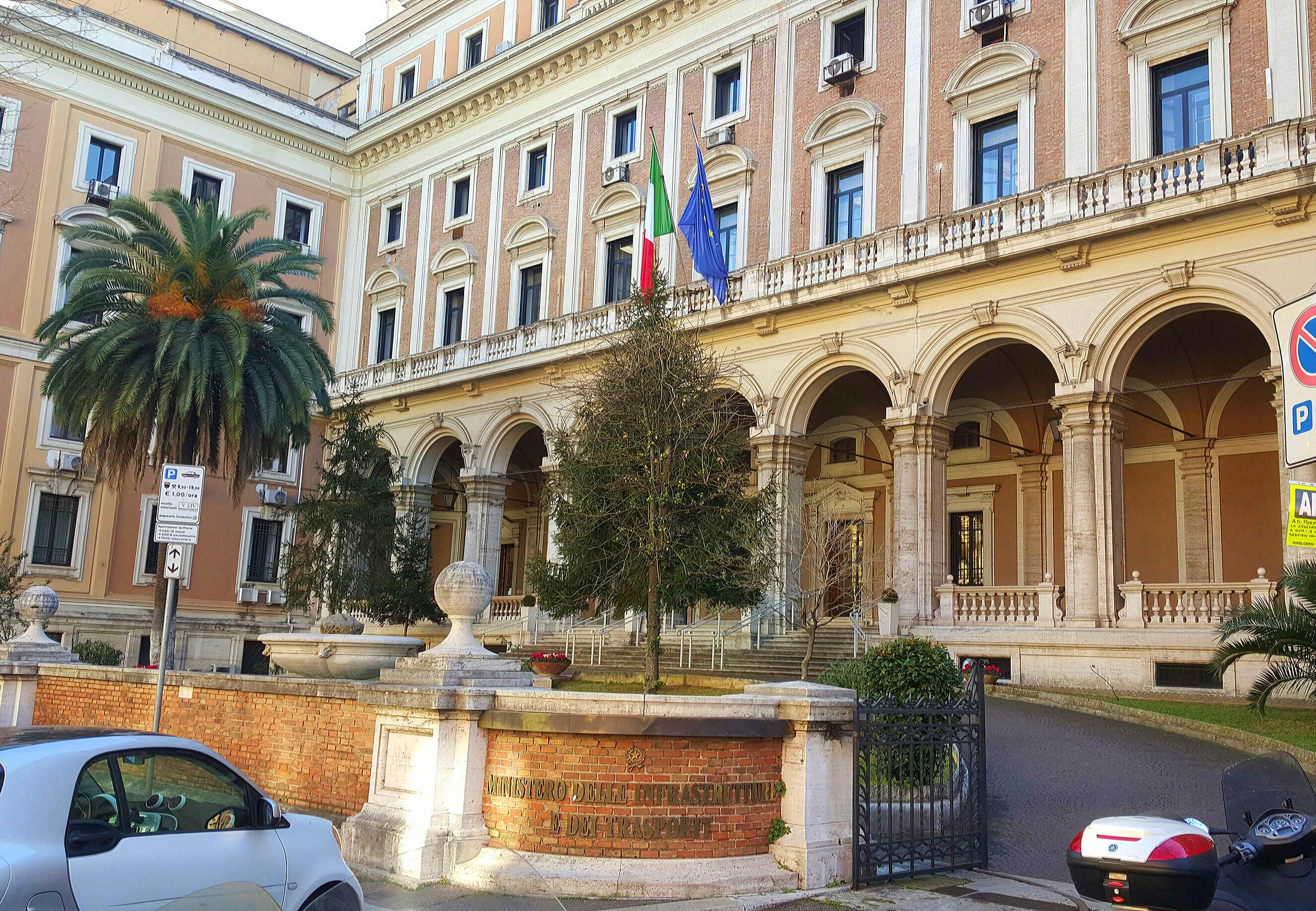
- Ministry headquarters in Roma, Piazza Porta Pia

Agency overview
- Formed: 2001; 25 years ago
- Jurisdiction: Government of Italy
- Headquarters: Piazzale di Porta Pia, 1 00161 Rome
- Website: www.mit.gov.it

The Ministry of Infrastructure and Transport (Ministero delle Infrastrutture e dei Trasporti or MIT) is the government ministry for transport in the Republic of Italy. It is responsible for all transport infrastructure (roads, motorways, railways, ports, airports) as well as general transport planning and logistics, especially for urban transport schemes, with a particular attention at their sustainability. It is led by the Italian Minister of Sustainable Infrastructures and Mobility.

== History ==
In 2021, the Ministry was renamed Ministry of Sustainable Infrastructure and Mobility (Ministero delle Infrastrutture e della Mobilità Sostenibili or MIMS). However, it reverted to its previous name in November 2022.

=== Ministry of Public Works ===
The Ministry of Public Works was a ministry in the government of Italy dealing with all infrastructure matters, including roads, motorways, railways, ports, airports and other means of transport. It was set up in 1860, under the government of Camillo Benso, Count of Cavour, with the first ministerial post being held by Stefano Jacini.

=== Ministry of Transport ===
The Ministry of Transport was born on 12 December 1944 when the third Bonomi government split the then Ministry of Communications into a Ministry of Transport and a Ministry for Post and Telecommunications.

=== Corps of the Port Captaincies – Coast Guard ===
Coat of arms of Italian Coast Guard Headquarters

The Corps of the Port Captaincies – Coast Guard (Corpo delle Capitanerie di porto – Guardia costiera) is the coast guard of Italy and is part of the Italian Navy under the control of the Ministry of Infrastructure and Transport. Its head office is in Rome.

=== Bassanini reforms and birth of the modern Ministry ===
On 11 June 2001, the second Berlusconi government was the first Italian government in history not to have a specific minister for public works, since the Ministry of Public Works, the Ministry of Transport and the Ministry for Post and Telecommunications had all been merged into the new Ministry of Infrastructure and Transport, created by the Bassanini reforms of 1999 (coming into force in 2001).
