= Alessandro Lessona =

Italian politician (1891–1991)

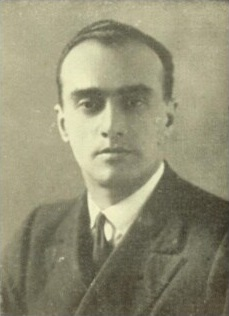

Minister of Colonies of the Kingdom of Italy
- In office 11 June 1936 – 8 April 1937
- Preceded by: Benito Mussolini
- Succeeded by: Benito Mussolini
- Minister of Italian Africa
- In office 8 April 1937 – 20 November 1937
- Preceded by: post established
- Succeeded by: Benito Mussolini

State Undersecretary for the Minister of Colonies
- In office 12 September 1929 – 11 June 1936

State Undersecretary for National Economy
- In office 9 July 1928 – 12 September 1929

Member of the Senate of Italy
- In office 16 May 1963 – 4 June 1968

Personal details
- Born: 9 September 1891 Rome, Kingdom of Italy
- Died: 10 November 1991 (aged 100) Florence, Italy
- Party: National Fascist Party; Italian Social Movement; People’s Monarchist Party

Military service
- Allegiance: Kingdom of Italy
- Branch/service: Royal Italian Army
- Rank: Captain
- Battles/wars: World War I; Battles of the Isonzo; Macedonian front; Western Front
- Awards: Silver Medal of Military Valor; War Merit Cross

Alessandro Lessona (Rome, 9 September 1891 – Florence, 10 November 1991) was an Italian Fascist politician, Minister of the Colonies of the Kingdom of Italy from June 1936 to April 1937 and Minister of Italian Africa from April to November 1937.

== Biography ==
The son of Carlo Lessona, he entered the Royal Academy of Infantry and Cavalry in Modena in 1910 and graduated as a cavalry lieutenant. He took part in the First World War, earning a Silver Medal of Military Valor in 1916 during the fighting near Monfalcone. He then went on to serve for a short period in Macedonia after which, having returned to Italy, he was sent to France, where he became part of the staff of the II Corps; after ranking first in an examination held by the General Staff, he was called by General Armando Diaz at the head of his secretariat. He later moved with Diaz to the Ministry of War, remaining there as Chief of Staff until the March on Rome, in which he participated, having joined the National Fascist Party. He then left the Army for personal reasons and became federal secretary of the PNF section of Savona. In 1925 he was tasked with a diplomatic mission to King Zog I of Albania, which led to the stipulation, in November 1925, of a secret military treaty, stating that Albania made its territory available for deployment of Italian troops in the event of a war between Italy and Yugoslavia. Between 1928 and 1939 he was also President of the Italian Tennis Federation.

During the Fascist regime, Lessona was among the protagonists of Italian colonial policy; after serving as undersecretary at the Ministry of Colonies from 1929 to 1936 (acting as de facto minister, with Mussolini being the titular minister), after the outbreak of the Second Italo-Ethiopian War he played an important part in having General Emilio De Bono removed from the command of the northern front and in entrusting this command to Marshal of Italy Pietro Badoglio at the end of 1935. In April 1936 he was called by Badoglio to accompany him on the march on Addis Ababa and on his entrance into the city, which took place on 5 May. After the conquest of Ethiopia he was made Minister of the Colonies (a post renamed as Minister of Italian Africa in April 1937, at his proposal), remaining in office for a year and a half. Determined to fully exploit the economic resources of the colonies, he sent Luigi Razza and later Italo Balbo to Libya as governors, although the latter was often critical of his directives. He initiated the policy of racial separation between whites and blacks in the Italian colonies, and in 1936 he founded the Colonial Police Corps, which three years later was renamed Italian African Police Corps. In this period Lessona began to clash with Marshal of Italy Rodolfo Graziani over the administration of the conquered lands. A few months later he discovered an evident embezzlement, which directly involved the former governor of Eritrea Emilio De Bono, and ordered the works contract to be rewritten. The question was brought to the attention of Mussolini, with whom De Bono had much greater influence than Lessona, and the Duce began to look critically at his minister, asking to supervise his work. Within a few months, a long series of negative reports accumulated on Lessona ranging from corruption, to the casual assignment of public offices, and above all to the suspicion that he was building a personal domain of his own in East Africa. As a result of this, on 19 November 1937, after the appointment of Amedeo of Savoy-Aosta as Viceroy of Italian East Africa, Mussolini took over the Ministry of Italian Africa for himself and exonerated Lessona from any institutional position, excluding him from political and public life.

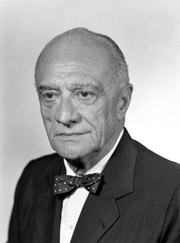
Lessona in the 1960s

Lessona then started an academic career as professor at the Faculty of Political Sciences of the Sapienza University of Rome, where he would remain until retirement age; for "extraordinary merits" he was awarded the chair of Colonial Political History (later renamed History and Institutions of Afro-Asian Countries). After World War II, the Peace Treaty signed on 10 February 1947, provided, in article 45, the commitment by Italy to ensure the arrest and surrender, for the purpose of a subsequent trial, of all individuals accused of having committed or ordered war crimes. In May 1948 the Ethiopian government sent to the UN commission for war criminals a list of ten suspected criminals, including Alessandro Lessona, as "suspected of complicity in acts of systematic terrorism". Ethiopia had appealed to a clause of the Peace Treaty, which indicated an uninterrupted state of war between it and Italy since 3 October 1935; subsequently, in November 1948, the Ethiopian government asked for the surrender of the accused to put them on trial. However, Italy managed to obtain from the Allies the renunciation of the application of these clauses, committing to directly provide for the judgment of all the alleged criminals, identified by the UN Commission. The work of the Italian Commission of Inquiry ended with the dismissal of the cases against all of the accused.

At the beginning of the 1950s Lessona joined the Italian Social Movement, but was initially marginalized due to his difficult relationship with Rodolfo Graziani (who was, at that stage, honorary president of the party) and because of his past decision of not joining the Italian Social Republic. Between 1954 and 1955 he was part of the People's Monarchist Party of Achille Lauro, of which he was also secretary for a few months, but when the PMP merged into the Italian Democratic Party of Monarchist Unity he rejoined the ranks of the MSI. In the 1960s, when historian Angelo Del Boca demonstrated that the Italian army had used poison gas during the Ethiopian war, Lessona contested his work, asserting that "Italy did not resort to illegal weapons", thus regaining the confidence of the neo-Fascists; in the political elections of 1963 he thus managed to obtain a seat in the Senate with the Italian Social Movement. Five years later he again ran for the Senate, but was not elected and then retired from public life. He died in 1991 a few months after his hundredth birthday, thus becoming the longest-lived and last surviving member of the Fascist regime.
