= Giuseppe Paratore =

Italian attorney and politician

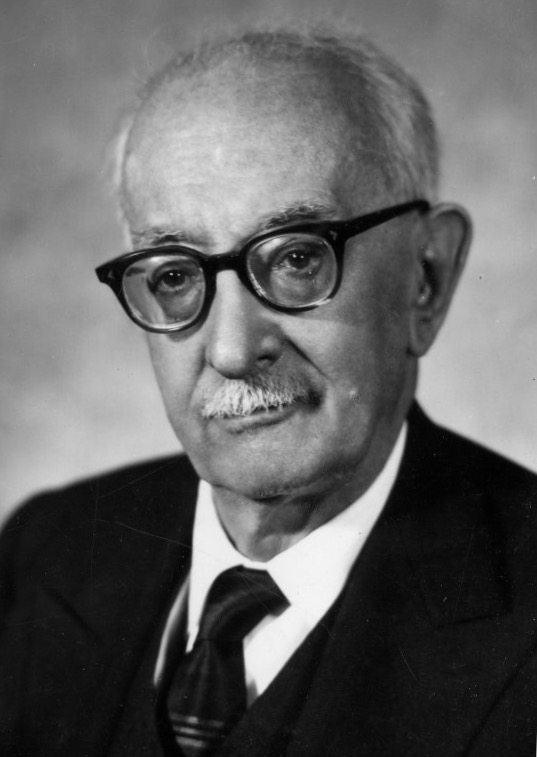
Giuseppe Paratore

Giuseppe Paratore (31 May 1876 – 26 February 1967) was an Italian attorney and politician. He was President of the Italian Senate from 26 June 1952 to 24 March 1953. President Giovanni Gronchi appointed him senator for life on 9 November 1957.

Political offices
| Preceded by Enrico De Nicola | President of the Italian Senate; 1952–1953 | Succeeded by Meuccio Ruini |
