= Vincenzo Arangio-Ruiz =

Italian politician

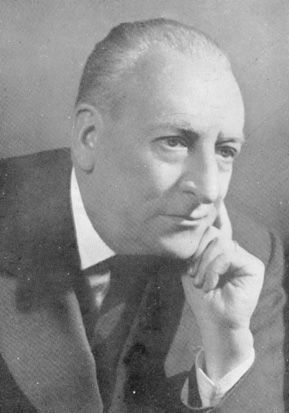
- Born: 1884; Naples
- Died: 1964 (aged 79–80); Rome
- Occupation: Roman Law scholar

Vincenzo Arangio-Ruiz (Naples 1884 - Rome 1964) was a distinguished Italian jurist and Roman Law scholar, who also held the post of Minister of Justice and Minister of Education. Among his most famous works on Roman Law are: Storia del diritto romano (1937) and, Istituzioni di diritto romano (1957).

Arangio-Ruiz was the minister of justice in the government of Ivanoe Bonomi and Ferruccio Parri. He held the post from June 1944 to December 1945.

He was president of the National Union for the Fight against Illiteracy and general president of the National Corps of Young Italian Explorers (CNGEI) from 1954 to 1962.

On April 16, 1956, he became a member of the Turin Academy of Sciences.

He died in 1964, at the age of 79, of lung disease.

== Biography ==
Nacque a Napoli nel 1884 da Gaetano, professore di diritto costituzionale, e Clementina Cavicchia. Si laureò nel 1904 e nel 1907 ottenne il primo incarico universitario presso University of Camerino, per passare poi University of Perugia, cui seguirono Cagliari, Messina e Modena. Nel 1925 fu tra i firmatari del Manifesto of the Anti-Fascist Intellectual di Benedetto Croce. Ordinario di diritto romano presso la facoltà di Giurisprudenza University of Naples Federico II, fu preside della facoltà dal 1943 al 1945. Successivamente, insegnò all'università La Sapienza di Roma. Fra i suoi allievi, Mario Talamanca e Feliciano Serrao.

An anti-fascist, liberal, he also held the posts of Minister of Grace and Justice in the Second Badoglio government(first government of national unity) and Minister of Education in the Third Bonomi government and the Parri government.

Thanks to his discovery on an Egyptian marketplace of a parchment containing fragments of Institutes (Gaius), one of the parts lost during the recovery of the same work from a palimpsest codex found in 1817 in a library in Verona was filled in. This was the part relating to co-ownership (Consortium ercto non cito).

His most important writings on Roman law (still studied in Italian universities) are: History of Roman Law (1937); Institutions of Roman Law (1957).

He was president of the National Union for the Fight against Illiteracy and general president of the Corpo Nazionale Giovani Esploratori ed Esploratrici Italiani from 1954 to 1962.

On April 16, 1956, he became a member of the Turin Academy of Sciences.

He died in 1964, at the age of 79, of lung disease..
