= Giorgio Amendola =

Italian writer and politician (1907–1980)

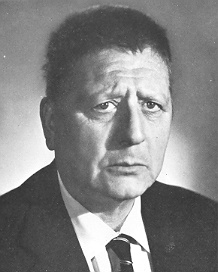
- Amendola in 1972

Member of the European Parliament
- In office 17 July 1979 – 5 June 1980
- Constituency: Southern Italy

Member of the Chamber of Deputies
- In office 8 May 1948 – 5 June 1980
- Constituency: Naples

Member of the Constituent Assembly
- In office 25 June 1946 – 31 January 1948
- Constituency: Naples

Personal details
- Born: 21 November 1907 Rome, Italy
- Died: 5 June 1980 (aged 72) Rome, Italy
- Party: PCI
- Spouse: Germaine Lecocq (m. 1934)
- Relatives: Giovanni Amendola (father); Eva Kühn (mother)
- Occupation: Politician, journalist

Giorgio Amendola (21 November 1907 – 5 June 1980) was an Italian writer and politician. He is regarded and often cited as one of the main precursors of the Olive Tree. Born in Rome in 1907, Amendola was the son of Lithuanian intellectual Eva Kühn and Giovanni Amendola, a liberal anti-fascist who died in 1926 in Cannes after being attacked by killers hired by Italian dictator Benito Mussolini. He secretly joined the Italian Communist Party (PCI) in 1929. After graduating in law, he started to promote opposition to the Mussolini regime.

Arrested and brought into exile in France, and successively banished to Santo Stefano Island in the Pontine Islands, Amendola was freed in 1943 by the resistance troops, which he then joined. After World War II, he served as a deputy in the Italian Parliament for the PCI from 1948 until his death in 1980. He became known especially in the 1970s as one of the leaders of the party's right wing, which espoused gradual removal of the ideas of Soviet Communism and Leninism, and supported alliances with the more moderate parties, especially the Italian Socialist Party, a concept later called Eurocommunism. One of his main allies was Giorgio Napolitano, a member of the Chamber of Deputies who became President of Italy (2006–2015) and remained an avowed disciple and follower of Amendola.

From 1967 onwards, Amendola started to work as a writer; his most notable books include Comunismo, antifascismo e Resistenza ("Communism, Anti-Fascism and Resistance", 1967), Lettere a Milano ("Letters to Milan", 1973), Intervista sull'antifascismo ("Interview on Anti-Fascism", 1976, with Piero Melograni), Una scelta di vita ("A Choice of Life", 1978), and Un'isola ("An Island", 1980), which is considered to be his best work. Amendola died in Rome, aged 72, after a long illness. His wife Germaine Lecocq, whom he met during his French exile in Paris and who helped him to write his last work, died a few hours after Amendola.

== Electoral history ==
Election	House	Constituency	Party	Votes	Result
1946	Constituent Assembly	Naples–Caserta	PCI	31,556	Elected
1948	Chamber of Deputies	Naples–Caserta	FDP	99,051	Elected
1953	Chamber of Deputies	Naples–Caserta	PCI	124,025	Elected
1958	Chamber of Deputies	Naples–Caserta	PCI	141,958	Elected
1963	Chamber of Deputies	Naples–Caserta	PCI	124,490	Elected
1968	Chamber of Deputies	Naples–Caserta	PCI	131,469	Elected
1972	Chamber of Deputies	Naples–Caserta	PCI	122,518	Elected
1976	Chamber of Deputies	Naples–Caserta	PCI	154,750	Elected
1979	Chamber of Deputies	Naples–Caserta	PCI	115,870	Elected
1979	European Parliament	Southern Italy	PCI	805,449	Elected

== Bibliography ==
- Bosworth, R. J. B. (13 January 2023). Politics, Murder and Love in an Italian Family: The Amendolas in the Age of Totalitarianisms. Cambridge: Cambridge University Press. ISBN 978-1-0092-8016-7 – via Google Books.
