= Giulio Rodinò =

Italian politician (1875–1946)

Giulio Rodinò di Miglione
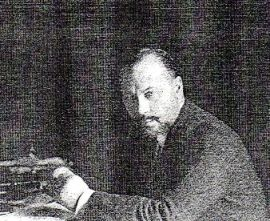

Member of the Chamber of Deputies
- In office 27 November 1913 – 9 November 1926

Minister of War
- In office 21 May 1920 – 15 June 1920
- In office 2 April 1921 – 4 June 1921

Minister of Justice
- In office 4 July 1921 – 26 February 1922

Personal details
- Born: 10 January 1875; Naples, Italy
- Died: 16 February 1946 (aged 71); Naples, Italy

Giulio Rodinò di Miglione (Naples 10 January 1875 – Naples, 16 February 1946) was an Italian politician. He was among the founders of the Italian People's Party (PPI) and of the Christian Democracy.

== Early life and career ==
He was the second son of Giovan Francesco Rodinò, baron of Miglione, gentleman of the chamber of King Ferdinand II of the Two Sicilies and Giuseppina Sanseverino, daughter of Luigi Sanseverino, prince of Bisignano. He attended the Jesuit college of it:Convitto Pontano alla Conocchia, graduated in law in 1897 and from 1899 practiced as a lawyer.

His political education drew on the thought of Giuseppe Toniolo and it:Filippo Meda. He broadly favoured the participation of Italian Catholics in elections, while respecting the non expedit. In 1901 he was elected city councilor in Naples and was re-elected several times until 1913. On the city council he supported mayor Luigi Miraglia in creating the free zone and the industrial district, completing the sewerage network, developing the Vomero area and creating the Institute of Public Housing.

== Parliamentary career ==
He stood unsuccessfully in national elections in 1903 and 1909 and was then elected deputy continuously from the XXIV (1913) to the XXVI (1926) legislatures of the Kingdom of Italy. He was in favor of Italy's intervention in the First World War.

After the war, the Italian parliament set up a Commission of Enquiry into War Expenditure (1920-22). Rodinò chaired it from 31 July 1920 to 2 April 1921. The commission estimated the total cost of the war to be 94 billion lire, and uncovered many instances of profiteering and embezzlement.

== Ministerial career ==
He was appointed Minister of War in the second Nitti government (1920) and in the fifth Giolitti government (1921); He was later also Minister of Justice in the first Bonomi government (1921-22).

As War Minister under Giolitti, Rodinò worked on the demobilization and post-war reorganization of the army, reducing expenditure on armaments, and reform of the aeronautical sector. As Justice Minister, Rodinò worked for reform of the judicial system, reducing the number of magistrates and judicial offices. He started a pension project for lawyers and established a commission to study reform of civil procedure. His standing as a Catholic sparked controversy with secularist elements, particularly over his choice to go to the Vatican to present the government's condolences on the occasion of the death of Pope Benedict XV. As Justice Minister he was also markedly powerless in the face of the violence of fascist squadrism, so much so that Antonio Gramsci denounced his failures.

== Rise of fascism ==
Rodinò was absent from the Chamber of Deputies on the day Benito Mussolini asked for a vote of confidence in his first government. In the following session, however, following the line of his parliamentary group, he declared his vote in favour. On 12-13 April 1923, when collaboration between the People's Party and the Fascists was coming to an end, Rodinò presided over the IV Congress of the PPI in Turin. The political conflict that followed caused the resignation of the PPI ministers and, on 10 July 1923, of the political secretary Luigi Sturzo. Rodinò was them elected by the PPI leadership to the presidency of the triumvirate (together with Giuseppe Spataro and Giovanni Gronchi) who led the political secretariat from 10 July 1923 to 20 May 1924, during the divisions over the Acerbo law, the split from the clerical right-wing of the PPI parliamentary group, and the bitter electoral campaign of 1924.

Re-elected deputy for the PPI in 1924, he was vice-president of the Chamber at the beginning of the XXVII legislature. He took part in the Aventine Secession and was president of the assembly of parliamentary oppositions. As the Mussolini regime became more authoritarian, any accommodation with it became increasingly impossible to the point where he sensationally presented his resignation as vice president of the Chamber on 18 November 1925. In 1926 he was among the PPI representatives who attempted to regain their place in the Chamber of Deputies before being violently driven out by the fascists. On 9 November 1926, together with all the other Aventine deputies, he lost his parliamentary mandate by resolution of the Chamber on 9 November 1926 for having taken part in the secession. For twenty years he did not hold any public office.

== After fascism ==
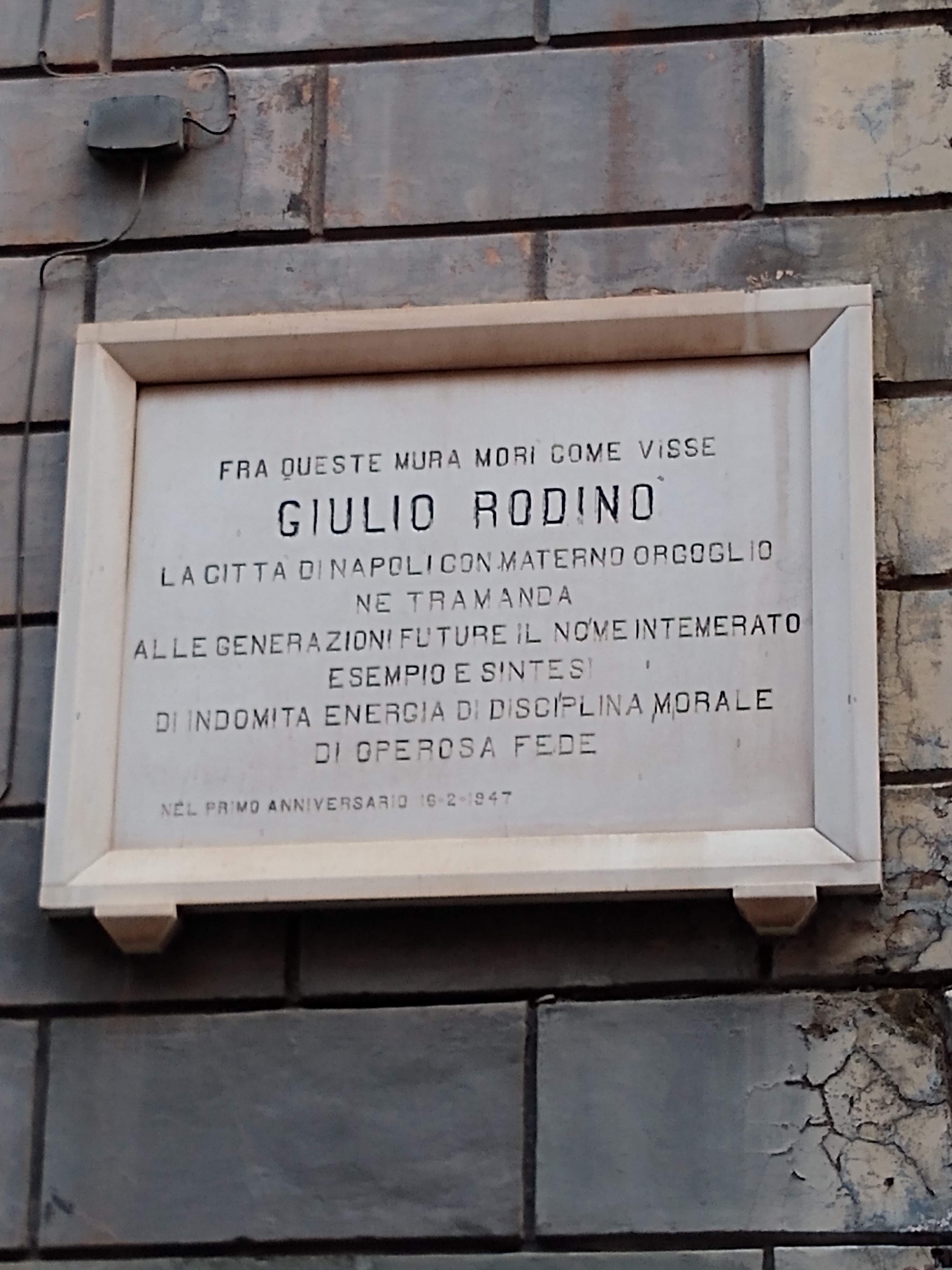
commemorative plaque in Naples

After the armistice of 8 September 1943, given his political experience and his fervent anti-fascist politics, he became one of the most important figures of the nascent Christian Democrats. He was one of the four ministers without portfolio in the second Badoglio government (1944) representing the National Liberation Committee, and subsequently Vice President of the Council of Ministers, together with Palmiro Togliatti, in the third Bonomi government from December 1944 to June 1945. He was a member of the National Council from its inauguration on 25 September 1945 until his premature death on 16 February 1946.

== Family ==
He married Nerina Sergio and had eight children. His daughter Giuseppina (1913-1977) married Baron Donato Colletta and her sister Elisa (1916-2004) married Enzo Bevilacqua. Of his sons Mario (1900-1960) was an engineer and deputy in the Constituent Assembly sitting with the Common Man's Front group; Guido (1901-1947) was a lawyer and member of the executive of the Christian Democrats; Ugo (1904-1949), a lawyer, deputy in the Constituent Assembly and Christian Democrat deputy in the first legislature of the Republic, undersecretary of defence; Marcello (1906-1994), engineer and doctor of jurisprudence, director of the SME, Chief Executive of RAI, founder and president of Telespazio; Diego (1908-1954), surgeon and university professor; and Riccardo (1911-1992), director of Enel.

== Honours ==
Cavaliere di Gran Croce decorato di Gran Cordone dell'Ordine dei Santi Maurizio e Lazzaro - ribbon for ordinary uniform

Knight Grand Cross of the Order of Saints Maurice and Lazarus

Cavaliere di Gran Croce decorato di Gran Cordone dell'Ordine della Corona d'Italia - ribbon for ordinary uniform

Knight Grand Cross of the Order of the Crown of Italy

Knight Grand Cross of the Order of Christ (Portugal)
