= Fausto Gullo =

Italian politician (1887–1974)

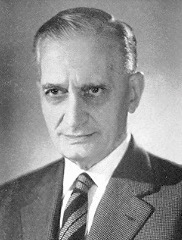

Minister of Grace and Justice
- In office 14 July 1946 – 1 June 1947
- Prime Minister: Alcide De Gasperi
- Preceded by: Palmiro Togliatti
- Succeeded by: Giuseppe Grassi

Minister of Agriculture and Forestry
- In office 22 April 1944 – 1 July 1946
- Prime Minister: Pietro Badoglio; Ivanoe Bonomi; Ferruccio Parri; Alcide De Gasperi
- Preceded by: Falcone Lucifero
- Succeeded by: Antonio Segni

Member of the Chamber of Deputies
- In office 8 May 1948 – 24 May 1972
- Constituency: Catanzaro

Member of the Constituent Assembly
- In office 25 June 1946 – 31 January 1948

Personal details
- Born: 16 June 1887 Catanzaro, Italy
- Died: 3 September 1974 (aged 87) Spezzano Piccolo, Italy
- Party: PSI (until 1921); PCd'I (1921–43); PCI (from 1943)
- Education: University of Naples
- Occupation: politician
- Profession: lawyer

Fausto Gullo (16 June 1887 – 3 September 1974) was an Italian politician.

== Biography ==
Gullo was born on 16 June 1887 in Catanzaro, where his father, an engineer, had moved for work reasons. He joined the Italian Socialist Party at a very young age and in 1907 became a municipal councilor of Spezzano Piccolo. After graduating in law from the University of Naples in 1909, he practiced the profession of lawyer. He carried out political activity in Cosenza and in the Presila towns. In 1914 he was elected provincial councilor for the Spezzano Grande district, with a program that included, among other things, the abolition of private property, religion and institutions of the time. After the World War I, he supported the Communist Abstentionist Fraction, headed by Amadeo Bordiga, whom he had met when he attended the University of Naples. In 1921, he joined the Communist Party of Italy (PCd'I) and, in 1924, he was elected to the Chamber of Deputies, but his election was then canceled following a recount of votes.

In the days following the murders of Giacomo Matteotti, Gullo was, together with Antonio Gramsci, against the Aventinian parliamentarians. To respond to the Matteotti crime committed by the fascists, the communists proposed a general strike and remained in Parliament unlike the other groups that went to the Aventine.

With the Federation of Cosenza, he sided against the progressive affirmation of the center line, represented by Antonio Gramsci. In the spring of 1925, he signed the initiatives of the Committee of Understanding, promoted, among others, by the deputies Onorato Damen, Bruno Fortichiari and Luigi Repossi.

Starting from 1925, he loosened his relations with the Communist Left, to the point of breaking them completely, as demonstrated by the adhesion to Gramsci's theses expressed in January 1926, during the provincial congress of the PCd'I in which Umberto Terracini (who was arrested in the same year together with Gramsci) of the same faction. Decided opponent of fascist corporatism, in 1926 he was assigned to confinement. He came out the following year only to be arrested in 1929 because he was accused of having caused "a certain awakening of subversivism".

During the twenty years of Fascism it was the reference point of the Calabrian anti-fascist movement.

== Political activity ==
In April 1944 he was appointed minister of agriculture in the second government of Pietro Badoglio. He was one of the three Calabrian representatives in the government. The others were Quinto Quintieri and Pietro Mancini.

Fausto Gullo was the first to propose the establishment of the Constituent Assembly during the first meeting of the first Council of Ministers of liberated Italy, as reported in his diary of those days.

As a deputy of the Constituent Assembly he contributed to the elaboration and affirmation of some values of the Fundamental Charter, in particular by discussing the following topics in the Assembly:

- the definition of the autonomy of the judiciary and, consequently, of the composition of the Constitutional Court
- the articles 29 and 30 about the family (he was the first to speak of equality between legitimate and natural children)
- his opposition to regionalism and for the construction of an Italy of municipalities

He held the position of Minister of Agriculture until 1946, in the Second Government of Alcide De Gasperi, when he was replaced in Agriculture by the Christian Democrat landowner Antonio Segni and was appointed Minister of Grace and Justice in place of Palmiro Togliatti. Between the summer of 1944 and the spring of 1945, as Minister of Agriculture of the Bonomi Government, he proposed to the Council of Ministers and saw them approved with a few modifications some decrees that had the ambition to create "pre-reforming" agricultural legislation. Elected as deputy to the Constituent Assembly, he confirmed his seat in the Chamber of Deputies until 1972, when he retired from active political life. The bond of solidarity that had characterized his political action made him always remembered as the "minister of the peasants".
