= Giovanni Amendola =

Italian journalist, professor, and politician (1882–1926)

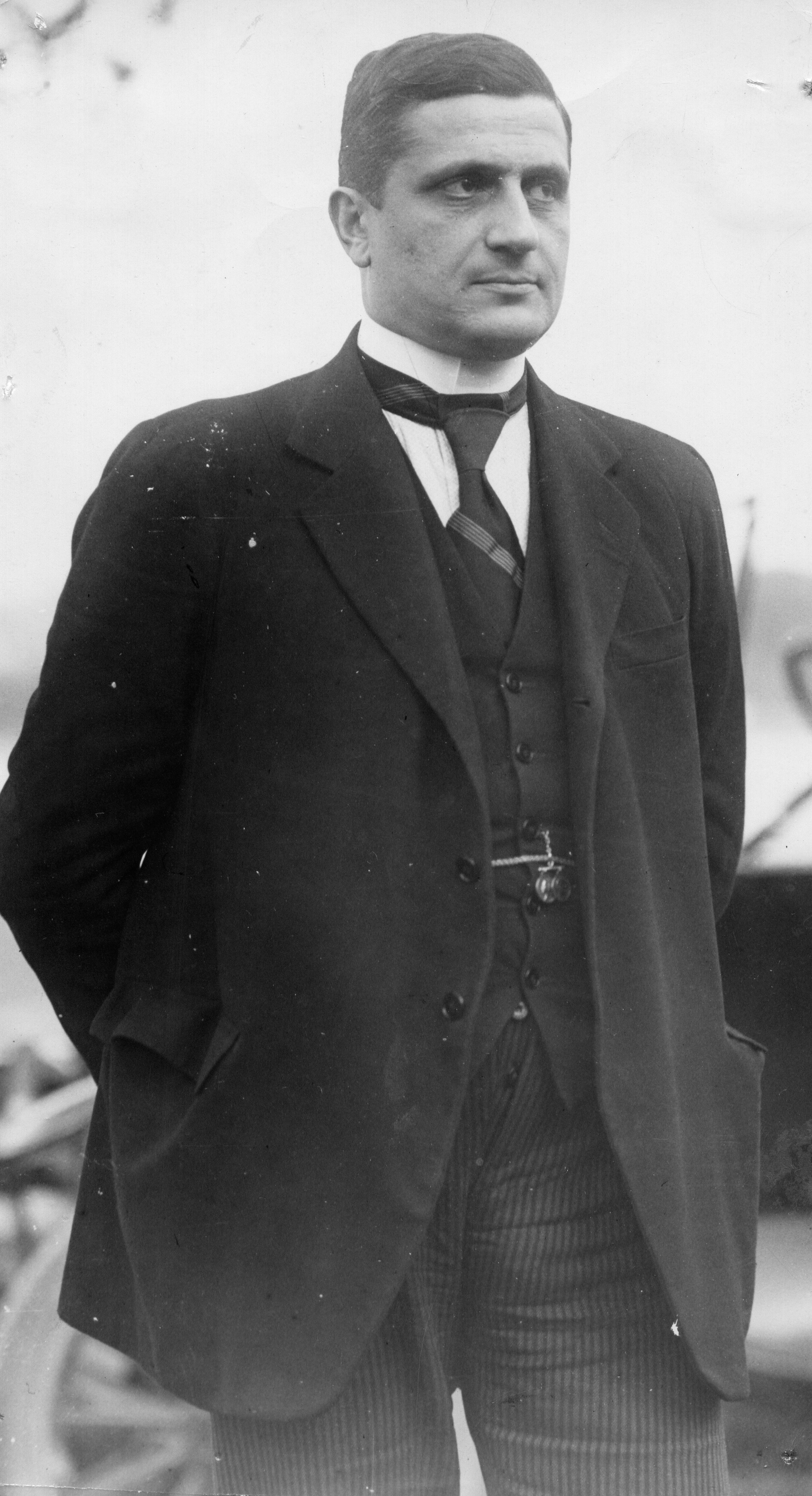
- Amendola in 1923.

Minister of the Colonies
- In office 26 February 1922 – 30 October 1922
- Prime Minister: Luigi Facta
- Preceded by: Giuseppe Girardini
- Succeeded by: Luigi Federzoni

Member of the Chamber of Deputies
- In office 1 December 1919 – 7 April 1926
- Constituency: Salerno

Personal details
- Born: 15 April 1882 Naples, Italy
- Died: 7 April 1926 (aged 43) Cannes, France
- Party: Italian Socialist Party (1897–1899); Italian Radical Party (1900–1919); Democratic Liberal Party (1919–1926)
- Spouse(s): Eva Kuhn (m. 1906–1926); his death
- Children: Giorgio (1907–1980); Adelaide (1910–1980); Antonio (1916–1953); Pietro (1918–2007)
- Education: University of Florence
- Profession: Journalist, philosopher

Giovanni Amendola (15 April 1882 – 7 April 1926) was an Italian journalist, professor, and politician. He is noted as an opponent of Italian fascism.

== Biography ==
=== Early life and education ===
Amendola was born in Naples on 15 April 1882. He moved to Rome, where he obtained the middle school diploma. At fifteen he joined the socialist youth. The following year he was an apprentice to the newspaper of the Italian Radical Party "La Capitale." He graduated with a degree in philosophy, he collaborated with such publications as Leonardo of Giovanni Papini and La Voce of Giuseppe Prezzolini. After that, he obtained the chair of theoretical philosophy at the University of Pisa. Between 1912 and 1914 Amendola was the editor of the Bologna-based daily Il Resto del Carlino. He worked for Corriere della Sera from 1914 to 1920.

=== Political career ===
Attracted by politics, he was elected three times to the Italian Chamber of Deputies for Salerno. In the 1910s, Amendola supported the Italian liberal movement, but he was completely against the ideology of Giovanni Giolitti. During World War I, he adopted a position of democratic irredentism and, at the end of the war, was nominated minister by Prime Minister Francesco Saverio Nitti.

His critical positions while confronting the right-wing extremism cost him a series of attacks by hired Fascist hitmen. In 1924 Amendola refused to adhere to the "Listone Mussolini", and attempted to become Prime Minister, at the head of a liberal coalition which ran in the elections. He was defeated, but continued the democratic battle by writing columns for the Il Mondo, a new daily newspaper which he founded together with other intellectuals in 1922.

During the height of the Matteotti Crisis, Amendola published the Rossi Testimony in one of his newspapers, on 27 December 1924. The document directly implicated Prime Minister Mussolini in the murder of Giacomo Matteotti, the leader of the Socialist PSU party, on the 10 June 1924. In the same document, Amendola also declared that Mussolini was behind the reign of terror which led up to the April 6th, 1924 general elections.

Resented by Mussolini for his prominent activism, Amendola was, together with the Unitary Socialist Party deputy Giacomo Matteotti and the popular priest Don Giovanni Minzoni, one of the régime's earliest victims, as he was beaten by 15 Blackshirts with clubs on 20 July 1925.

Amendola formulated the notion of totalitarianism as total political power which is exercised by the state in 1923, describing Italian Fascism as a system which was fundamentally different from conventional dictatorships. The term was later assigned a positive meaning in the writings of Giovanni Gentile, Italy's most prominent philosopher and leading theorist of fascism. He used the term totalitario to refer to the structure and goals of the new state which was to provide the "total representation of the nation and total guidance of national goals."

=== Death ===
Amendola died on 7 April 1926 at Cannes, France, in agony from violence inflicted when he was beaten by 15 Blackshirts with clubs.

== Personal life ==
Amendola married Eva Kuhn in 1906, and they remained together until Amendola's death in 1926. Together, they had four children: Giorgio Amendola (1907–1980), who became an important communist writer and politician, Adelaide (1910–1980), Antonio (1916–1953), and Pietro (1918–2007), who also became a journalist and politician.

== In popular culture ==
In the Florestano Vancini's film The Assassination of Matteotti (1973), Amendola is played by Damiano Damiani.

== Bibliography ==
- Eva Kühn Amendola: Life with Giovanni Amendola, Parenti, Florence 1960
- Giorgio Amendola: A choice of life, Rizzoli, Milan, 1976 ISBN 88-17-12610-1
- Simona Colarizi: The Democrats in the Opposition: Giovanni Amendola and the National Union (1922-1926), Il Mulino, Bologna, 1973
- Antonio Sarubbi: The World of Amendola and Cianca and the collapse of liberal institutions (1922-1926), Milan, 1998, ISBN 978-88-464-0514-2 (1986, 1998)
- Elio d'Auria: Liberalism and democracy in the political experience of Giovanni Amendola, Southern Publishing Company, Salerno-Catanzaro, 1978
- Elio d'Auria: Giovanni Amendola: Epistolario 1897-1926, 6 volumes, La Terza and La Caita, Rome-Bari, 1986-2011
- Elio d'Auria (edited by): Giovanni Amendola and the Crisis of the Liberal State. Political Writings from the Libyan War to the Opposition to Fascism, Newton Compton Editori, Rome, 1974

Political offices
Preceded by Giuseppe Girardini	Italian Minister of the Colonies; 1922	Succeeded by Luigi Federzoni
