= Stefano Jacini (politician, born 1826) =

Italian politician

Count Stefano Jacini
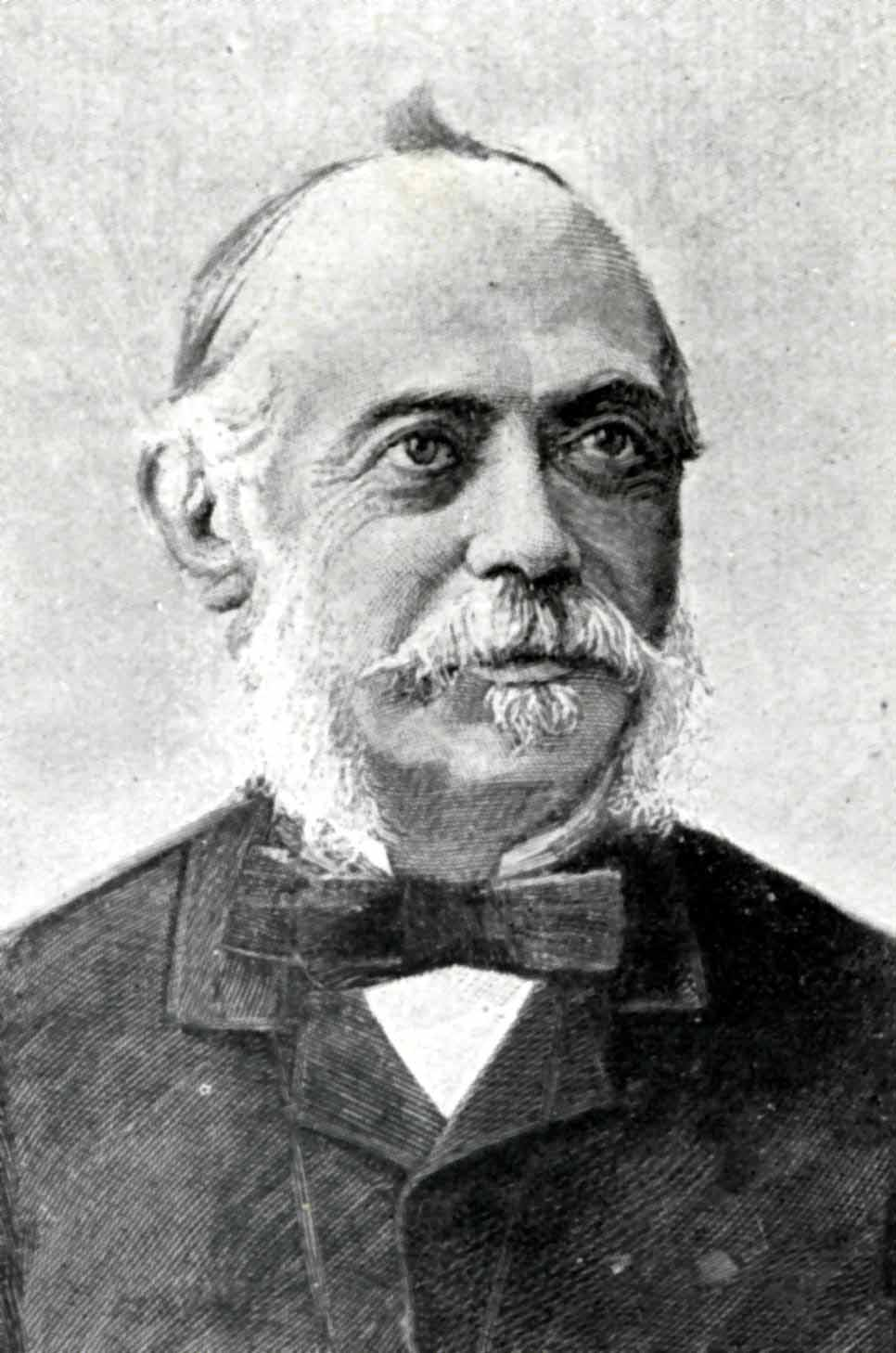
- Born: 20 June 1826; Casalbuttano, Lombardy, Italy
- Died: 15 March 1891 (aged 64); Milan, Italy
- Occupations: Statesman, Economist
- Known for: Minister of Public Works, Contributions to Italian railways and agricultural studies

Count Stefano Jacini (Casalbuttano, 20 June 1826 – Milan, 15 March 1891) was an Italian statesman and economist.

Born in Casalbuttano, Jacini was descended from an old and wealthy Lombard family. He studied in Switzerland, at Milan, and in German universities. During the period of the Austrian restoration in Lombardy (1849–1859) he devoted himself to literary and economic studies. For his work on La Proprietà fondiaria in Lombardia (Milan, 1856) he received a prize from the Milanese Società d'incoraggiamento di scienze e lettere and was made a member of the Istituto Lombardo. In another work, Sulle condizioni economiche della Valtellina (Milan, 1858, translated into English by W. E. Gladstone), he exposed the evils of Austrian rule, and he drew up a report on the general conditions of Lombardy and Venetia for Cavour.

He was minister of Public Works under Cavour in 1860–1861, in 1864 under La Marmora, and down to 1867 under Bettino Ricasoli. In 1866 he presented a bill favoring Italy's participation in the construction of the Gotthard Rail Tunnel. He was instrumental in bringing about the alliance with Prussia for the war of 1866 against Austria, and in the organization of the Italian railways. From 1881 to 1886 he was president of the commission to inquire into the agricultural conditions of Italy, and edited the voluminous report on the subject. He was created senator in 1870, and given the title of count in 1880. He died in 1891.
