= Labour Democratic Party =

Italian political party

Labour Democratic Party Partito Democratico del Lavoro
- Secretary: Ivanoe Bonomi
- President: Meuccio Ruini
- Founded: 8 September 1943; 83 years ago
- Dissolved: 31 January 1948; 78 years ago
- Preceded by: Italian Reformist Socialist Party; Social Democracy (not legal predecessors)
- Merged into: Italian Democratic Socialist Party (majority)
- Headquarters: Piazza Augusto Imperatore 32, Rome
- Newspaper: Ricostruzione
- Ideology: Social democracy
- Political position: Centre-left
- National affiliation: National Liberation Committee (1943–1947); National Democratic Union (1946–1948)

The Labour Democratic Party (Italian: Partito Democratico del Lavoro), previously known as Labour Democracy (Italian: Democrazia del Lavoro), was an anti-fascist and social-democratic political party in Italy. Founded in 1943 as the heir of the defunct Italian Reformist Socialist Party, it was formed by members of the Italian Socialist Party who wanted to cooperate with the Italian Liberal Party, the heir of the Liberals, which governed Italy from the days of Giovanni Giolitti. Leading members of the party were Ivanoe Bonomi, Meuccio Ruini, and Enrico Molè.

== History ==
The party became one of the six members of the National Liberation Committee, which governed Italy during the war against Italian fascism from 1944 to 1946. After having taken part at the 1946 Italian general election within the National Democratic Union, composed of Benedetto Croce's Italian Liberal Party and pre-Fascist leading Liberal politicians, such as Vittorio Emanuele Orlando and Francesco Saverio Nitti, some members joined the Italian Democratic Socialist Party (PSDI), of which Bonomi was honorary chairman from 1947 until his death in 1951. Others joined the Italian Socialist Party, the Italian Communist Party, and the Italian Liberal Party as independents.

== Electoral results ==
=== Italian Parliament ===
Chamber of Deputies
Election year	Votes	%	Seats	+/–	Leader
1946*	40,633 (15th)	0.18	9 / 556	–	Ivanoe Bonomi

Notes

- In 1946 elections, the DL ran alone in some provinces and under the National Democratic Union in some others, and elected one and eight deputies.

== Sources ==
- Lucio D'Angelo, Ceti medi e ricostruzione. Il Partito democratico del lavoro. 1943-1948, Milano, Giuffrè, 1981.
- Simona Colarizi, Storia dei partiti nell'Italia repubblicana, Roma-Bari, Laterza, 1994, pp. 74–75.
