= Ivanoe Bonomi =

Prime Minister of Italy (1921–1922; 1944–1945)

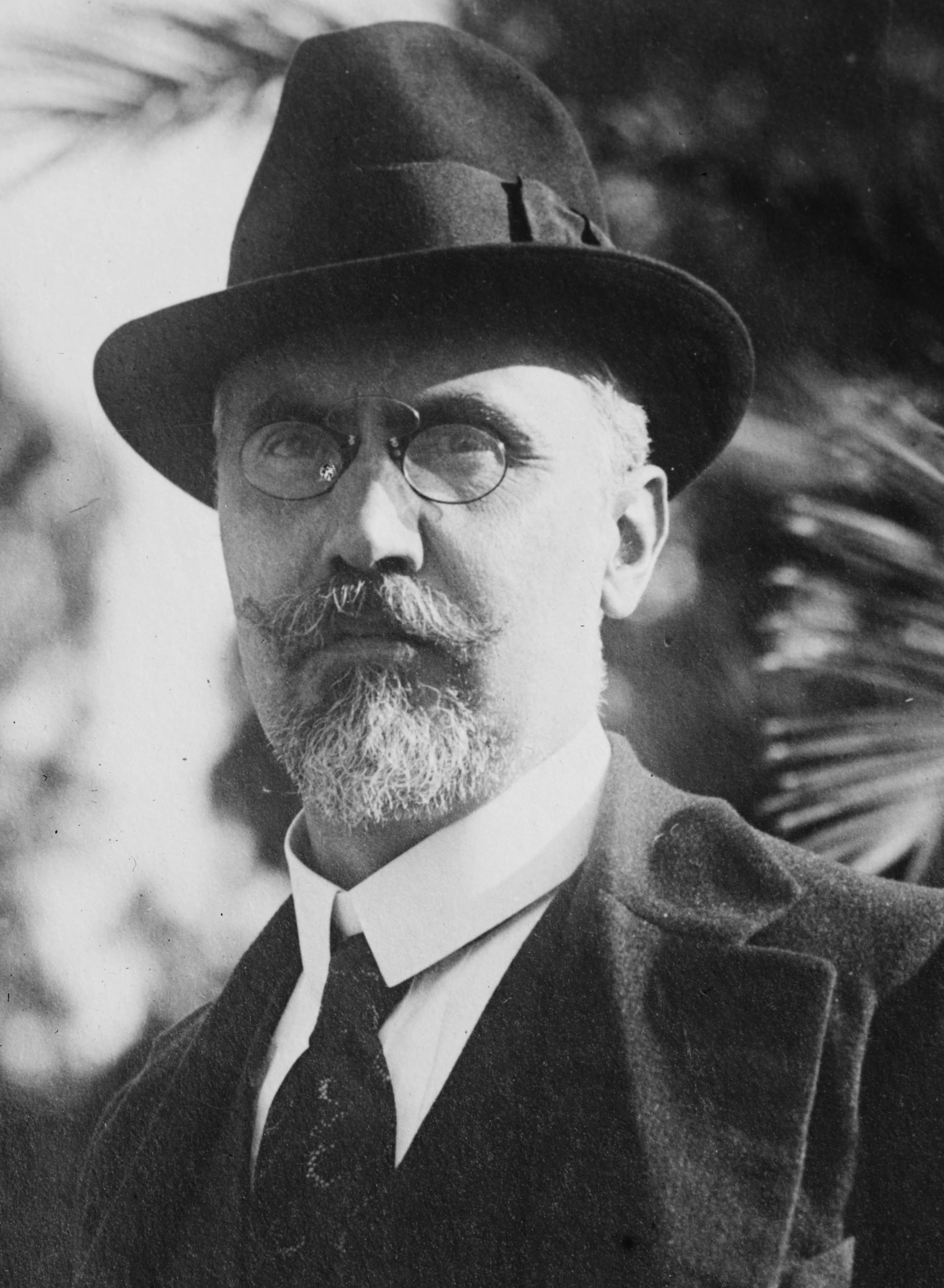

Prime Minister of Italy
- In office 18 June 1944 – 21 June 1945
- Monarch: Victor Emmanuel III
- Lieutenant General: The Prince of Piedmont
- Deputy: Palmiro Togliatti; Giulio Rodinò
- Preceded by: Pietro Badoglio
- Succeeded by: Ferruccio Parri
- In office 4 July 1921 – 26 February 1922
- Monarch: Victor Emmanuel III
- Preceded by: Giovanni Giolitti
- Succeeded by: Luigi Facta
Parliamentary offices
President of the Senate
In office 8 May 1948 – 20 April 1951
Preceded by	Pietro Tomasi Della Torretta
Succeeded by	Enrico De Nicola
Member of the Senate of the Republic
In office 8 May 1948 – 20 April 1951 (Ex officio)
Member of the Constituent Assembly
In office 25 June 1946 – 31 January 1948
Constituency	Italy at-large
Member of the Chamber of Deputies
In office 24 March 1919 – 25 January 1924
Constituency	Ostiglia

Personal details
- Born: 18 October 1873 Mantua, Italy
- Died: 20 April 1951 (aged 77) Rome, Italy
- Party: PSI (1893–1912); PSRI (1912–1922); PDL (1943–1948); PSDI (1948–1951)

Ivanoe Bonomi (Italian pronunciation: [iˈvaːnoe boˈnɔːmi]; 18 October 1873 – 20 April 1951) was an Italian politician and journalist who served as Prime Minister of Italy from 1921 to 1922 and again from 1944 to 1945.

== Background and earlier career ==
Ivanoe Bonomi was born in Mantua, Italy, in a bourgeois family. He studied natural sciences at the University of Bologna and graduated in 1896. After working for two years as a high school teacher he also completed a law degree in the same university.

In 1893, influenced by the burgeoning cooperative movement, the spread of Marxist propaganda in the Mantuan countryside, and meetings with socialist leaders like Filippo Turati, Leonida Bissolati, and Anna Kuliscioff, he joined the Italian Socialist Party (at the time called Italian Socialist Workers' Party). In August 1894 he attended the Socialist congress for the Lombardy region, which was held in semi-clandestine fashion due to the repressive measures taken by Prime Minister Francesco Crispi. In November he was sentenced to 75 days of internal exile for his political activities.

From the beginning he held reformist views and advocated for revisionist positions, including an alliance between the proletariat and the petite bourgeoisie in defense of democratic institutions. In 1896 he proposed that the Party should endorse liberal, bourgeois candidates in run-off elections, and claimed that the main task of the working class was the transformation of Italy into a modern bourgeois democracy before socialism could be established. In spite of early calls for full land collectivization eventually he moved towards more moderate solutions, like the voluntary creation of cooperatives, in agriculture as well. He was critical of the decision to call the general strike of September 1904, but nonetheless collaborated with revolutionary syndicalists for the duration of the strike.

Internationally he supported other reformists like Eduard Bernstein, Alexandre Millerand, and Jean Jaurès.

In 1907 he was elected to the city council of Rome and was a member of the city government for one year. In the 1909 general elections he was elected to the Chamber of Deputies in the constituency of Mantua. During this time he was a strong advocate of support for Giovanni Giolitti, a liberal reformer, since he felt that this would allow Socialists to influence and contribute to progressive developments like the proposed introduction of universal suffrage. His positions, however, continued to remain a minority within the Socialist Party even if at this time the main leader was Turati, himself a reformist. In 1911 Bonomi dissented again with the party line by writing articles expressing lukewarm support for the invasion of Libya. In March 1912 he, along with other members of the right wing of the Socialist Party, took the unprecedented move of meeting King Victor Emmanuel III to express their relief for the failure of an anarchist assassination attempt. This finally prompted his expulsion at the party congress held that year, where the more radical faction gained majority control.

Those who had been expelled founded the Italian Reformist Socialist Party (PSRI), which won 3.92% of the vote and 19 seats in the 1913 elections.

The PSRI supported Italy's entry into World War I and gave vital support to the nationalist government led by Antonio Salandra. When Italy declared war on Austria-Hungary in May 1915, Bonomi volunteered in the Army and was sent to the front as a sub-lieutenant in the 7th Alpini Regiment, taking part in the fighting. In June 1916 he was appointed Minister of Public Works in the Boselli cabinet and held this position for twelve months, until his resignation due to disagreements on domestic policy. He would hold the same Ministry a second time in the Orlando cabinet from January to June 1919. In the war's aftermath he was Minister of War (March 1920 – April 1921) and then briefly Minister of the Treasury under Prime Ministers Francesco Saverio Nitti and Giolitti.

== Crisis of the Italian democracy and first term as prime minister ==
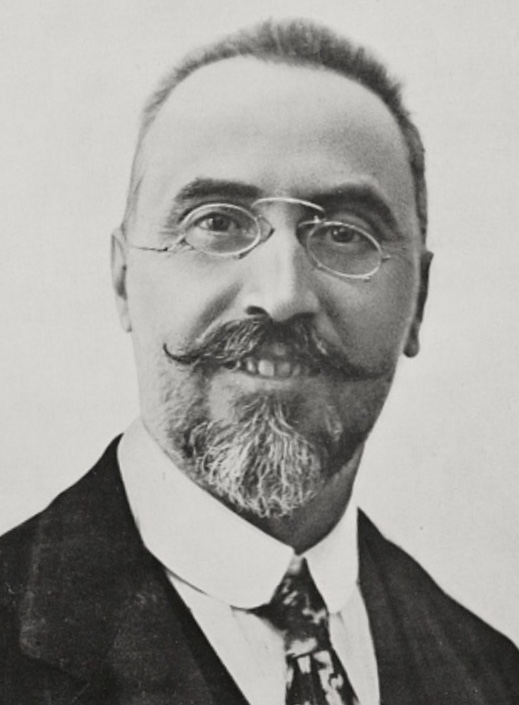
Bonomi at the time of his first term as prime minister, in 1922.

A few months later, he became Prime Minister of Italy for the first time, in a coalition government, the outgoing Minister of War, a politician with guaranteed contact with the army and an independent ex-reformist socialist, who had publicly welcomed the spread of Fascism in his home province of Mantua. Early in 1922, his government collapsed, and he was replaced as prime minister by Luigi Facta, amidst the Fascist insurgency led by Benito Mussolini.

== During the Fascist period ==
With the consolidation of the Fascist regime, Bonomi withdrew from political life. In the following years he devoted himself to historical research, publishing a number of articles on Giuseppe Mazzini and the 1849 Roman Republic, and working on a history of Italian politics from 1870 to 1918, which would only be published in 1944.

Towards the end of 1942, as Italy was facing military setbacks on many fronts in World War II and growing political dissent at home, he reprised clandestine contacts with anti-fascists from various political parties. He also began the publication of the underground newspaper la Ricostruzione.

On 2 June 1943, he had a private audience with King Victor Emmanuel III where he proposed Mussolini's dismissal, the appointment of a military government, and the denunciation of the alliance with Nazi Germany. The sovereign did not act on this proposal. During the same month Bonomi had other meetings with Maria José, Princess of Piedmont, and the heir apparent, Prince Umberto II, suggesting the appointment of Marshal Pietro Badoglio as prime minister with himself as his deputy, with the goals of ending both the Fascist dictatorship and the alliance with Adolf Hitler. While by this time Victor Emmanuel had become essentially supportive of the same plan, the King preferred a different solution centered on some leaders of the Armed Forces as well as dissenters within the Fascist Party, which meant that Bonomi was not involved in the planning of Mussolini's dismissal and arrest on 25 July.

== Fall of Fascism and second and third terms as prime minister ==
After the fall of Fascism in July 1943, Bonomi attended a number of anti-fascist meetings which asked the new government led by Badoglio to disband Fascist organizations, release political prisoners, and restore the free press.

On 9 September, the day after the armistice of Cassibile was announced, six anti-fascist parties agreed to form a National Liberation Committee (CLN), chaired by Bonomi, to lead the Italian resistance movement. The member parties were the Italian Communist Party, the Italian Socialist Party, the Action Party, the Christian Democracy, the Italian Liberal Party, and Bonomi's own Labour Democratic Party. While Rome was under German control Bonomi hid in the area of the Archbasilica of Saint John Lateran, under the protection of Pope Pius XII.

As president of the CLN Bonomi sought to steer discussion away from suggestions that the monarchy should be deposed or that the King should abdicate. Relations with the royal government, which had taken refuge in the Allied-controlled South, were a major point of friction. Communists, Socialists and Actionists saw Victor Emmanuel III as complicit with Fascism and responsible for the disastrous wartime situation due to his attitude during both Mussolini's rise and the nearly twenty years of dictatorship, and demanded his immediate departure. Christian Democrats and Liberals preferred to delay any discussion on the form of government to the end of the war, seeing the monarchy as a factor of legitimacy and national unity. Bonomi was also particularly concerned with suppressing any revolutionary aspirations on part of the leftist parties and pursuing the restoration of pre-Fascist liberal democracy. These discussions eventually led him to resign from his post on 24 March 1944. He would return as soon as 5 May, after Communist Party secretary Palmiro Togliatti, who had just returned from exile, unexpectedly endorsed the moderate position. Around the same time Enrico De Nicola also brokered a compromise solution where Victor Emmanuel would delegate his powers to the more palatable Prince Umberto, which the King accepted reluctantly.

On 8 June, two days after the liberation of Rome, Badoglio and representatives of CLN parties, with Noel Mason-MacFarlane as representative of the Allies, agreed that Bonomi would become prime minister. He was sworn in on 18 June, initiating his second stint as prime minister in the second Bonomi government. The government was seated at first in the Southern city of Salerno and then, from mid-July, in Rome. Bonomi also held the positions of Minister of the Interior and Minister for Italian Africa (at the time under Allied occupation) and, until December 1944, Minister of Foreign Affairs. His appointment was taken without the knowledge of British Prime Minister Winston Churchill, who considered Badoglio a safer choice and had Mason-MacFarlane dismissed over this decision. Mason-MacFarlane, on his part, agreed with the American viewpoint that Badoglio was too discredited to continue serving and that his association with Fascism would weaken the Italian monarchy.

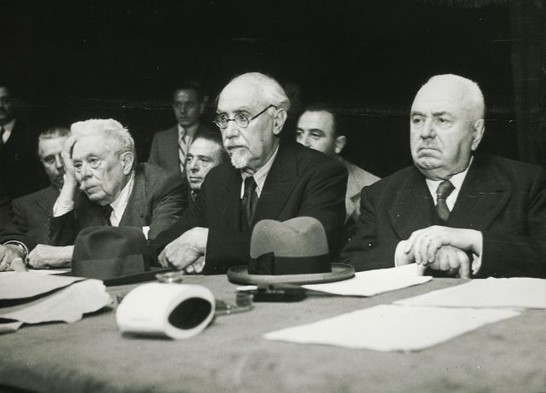
Vittorio Emanuele Orlando, Bonomi, and Francesco Saverio Nitti during a sitting of the Italian Constituent Assembly in 1946.

The main issues facing the new government were the prosecution of the war until the liberation of Italy from German occupation, as well as the practical implementation of various compromises that had been previously agreed on in principle. As prime minister, Bonomi formally recognized the partisan forces operating in the North as part of the war effort, and organized them under a unified command led by Army general Raffaele Cadorna Jr., who was parachuted in the occupied areas. He also approved a decree which provided for the election of a Constituent Assembly after the end of the conflict. Continuing disputes on royal prerogatives and on the extent of purges of Fascist sympathisers within the state bureaucracy, however, led him to resign on 25 November. The ensuing government crisis, which saw both Carlo Sforza (who was vetoed by the British over his republican sympathies) and Meuccio Reuini being considered as potential prime ministers, was solved with the re-appointment of Bonomi, who offered the position of deputy prime minister to the Christian Democracy and the Communist Party. The Socialist and Action parties chose not to take part in the new cabinet of the third Bonomi government.

In the last months of war he recognized the authority of the CLNAI (a subsidiary organ of the CLN operating in Northern Italy) in case of a general insurrection, and approved decrees concerning the establishment of a provisional legislative body and the organization of a future referendum on the form of government and general elections for the Constituent Assembly. He also passed reforms in social security, increasing payments to people with lower pensions.

With the end of the war in Europe Bonomi started facing more frequent criticism over his personality and actions in the pre-Fascist era, particularly from politicians who had been living underground in the occupied areas and were close to the partisan movement. Therefore, he resigned on 21 June 1945.

After his successor Ferruccio Parri resigned in December 1945 Liberals tried to propose Bonomi as prime minister, and then again the following year as a Minister in Alcide De Gasperi's cabinet, but unsuccessfully.

== Later life ==
In June 1946 he was elected to the Constituent Assembly in the list of the National Democratic Union, an alliance between the Liberal Party and the Labour Democratic Party. He chaired the Assembly's Treaties Committee. He also attended the preliminary conference for the adoption of the peace treaty with the Allies, in Paris, as a member of the Italian delegation.

In 1948 he became a member by right of the Italian Senate. He was elected as its president, the first after the establishment of the Republic, and served in that position until his death. He joined the newly established Italian Socialist Workers' Party (later known as the Italian Democratic Socialist Party), where he held the honorary position of president.

He died on 20 April 1951 in Palazzo Giustiniani, Rome, the official residence of the President of the Senate, aged 77.

== Sources ==
- Bosworth, R. J. B. (2007). Mussolini's Italy: Life Under the Fascist Dictatorship, 1915-1945, London: Penguin Books, ISBN 978-0-14-303856-6

Political offices
Preceded by Augusto Ciuffelli	Minister of Public Works; 1916–1917	Succeeded by Luigi Dari
Preceded by Luigi Dari	Minister of Public Works; 1919	Succeeded by Edoardo Pantano
Preceded by Alberico Albricci	Minister of War; 1920	Succeeded by Giulio Rodinò
Preceded by Giulio Rodinò	Minister of War; 1920–1921	Succeeded by Giulio Rodinò
Preceded by Filippo Meda	Minister of the Treasury; 1921	Succeeded by Giuseppe De Nava
Preceded by Carlo Sforza	Minister of Foreign Affairs; 1921	Succeeded by Pietro Tomasi Della Torretta
Preceded by Giovanni Giolitti	Prime Minister of Italy; 1921–1922	Succeeded by Luigi Facta
Preceded by Giovanni Giolitti	Minister of the Interior; 1921–1922	Succeeded by Luigi Facta
Preceded by Pietro Badoglio	Minister of Foreign Affairs; 1944	Succeeded by Alcide De Gasperi
Preceded by Pietro Badoglio	Prime Minister of Italy; 1944–1945	Succeeded by Ferruccio Parri
Preceded by Salvatore Aldisio	Minister of the Interior; 1944–1945	Succeeded by Ferruccio Parri
Vacant Title last held by Pietro Tomasi Della Torretta	President of the Italian Senate; 1948–1951	Succeeded by Enrico De Nicola
