= Legislature IV of Italy =

4th legislature of the Italian Republic (1963–1968)

Legislature IV of Italy IV legislatura della Repubblica Italiana
- 4th legislature

Type
- Type: bicameral
- Houses: Chamber of Deputies; Senate of the Republic

History
- Founded: 16 May 1963
- Disbanded: 4 June 1968 (5 years, 19 days)
- Preceded by: III Legislature
- Succeeded by: V Legislature

Leadership
- President of the Senate: Cesare Merzagora, Ind (16 May 1963 – 7 November 1967); Ennio Zelioli-Lanzini, DC (8 November 1967 – 4 June 1968)
- President of the Chamber of Deputies: Giovanni Leone, DC (16 May 1963 – 21 June 1963); Brunetto Bucciarelli-Ducci, DC (26 June 1963 – 4 June 1968)

Structure
- Seats: 630 (C); 315+ (S)
- Chamber of Deputies political groups: DC (260); PCI (166); PSI (87); PLI (39); PSDI (33); MSI (27); PDIUM (8); PRI (6); Others (4)
- Senate political groups: DC (132); PCI (85); PSI (44); PLI (19); MSI (15); PSDI (14); PDIUM (2); Others (4)

Elections
- Chamber of Deputies voting system: Proportional
- Senate voting system: Proportional
- Last general election: 28 April 1963

Meeting place
- Palazzo Montecitorio, Rome (C)
- Palazzo Madama, Rome (S)

Website
- Fourth Legislature – Chamber of Deputies; Fourth Legislature – Senate

Constitution
- Constitution of Italy

The Legislature IV of Italy (Italian: IV Legislatura della Repubblica Italiana) was the 4th legislature of the Italian Republic, and lasted from 16 May 1963 until 4 June 1968. Its composition was the one resulting from the general election of 28 April 1963.

== Main chronology ==
Despite a good approval in public opinion, late Fanfani's reformist policy produced a significant mistrust of the Italian industrial class and the right-wing faction of the Christian Democracy (DC).

In the 1963 general election, the Christian Democrats lost almost one million votes, gaining nearly 38%, while the Communists arrived second with 25%. However the liberals surged to 7%, their best results ever, receiving many votes from former Christian Democratic supporters, who were against Fanfani's centre-left policies. With the decline of electoral support, the majority of DC members decided to replace Fanfani with a provisional government (also defined "governo balneare", literarily "seaside government", by many journalists) led by impartial President of the Chamber of Deputies, Giovanni Leone. When the congress of the Italian Socialist Party (PSI) in autumn that year authorized a full engagement of the party into the government, Leone resigned and Aldo Moro became the new Prime Minister.

Aldo Moro's government was unevenly supported by the DC, but also by the PSI, along with the minor Italian Republican Party (PRI) and Italian Democratic Socialist Party (PSDI). The coalition was also known as Organic Centre-left and was characterized by consociationalist and social corporatist tendencies.

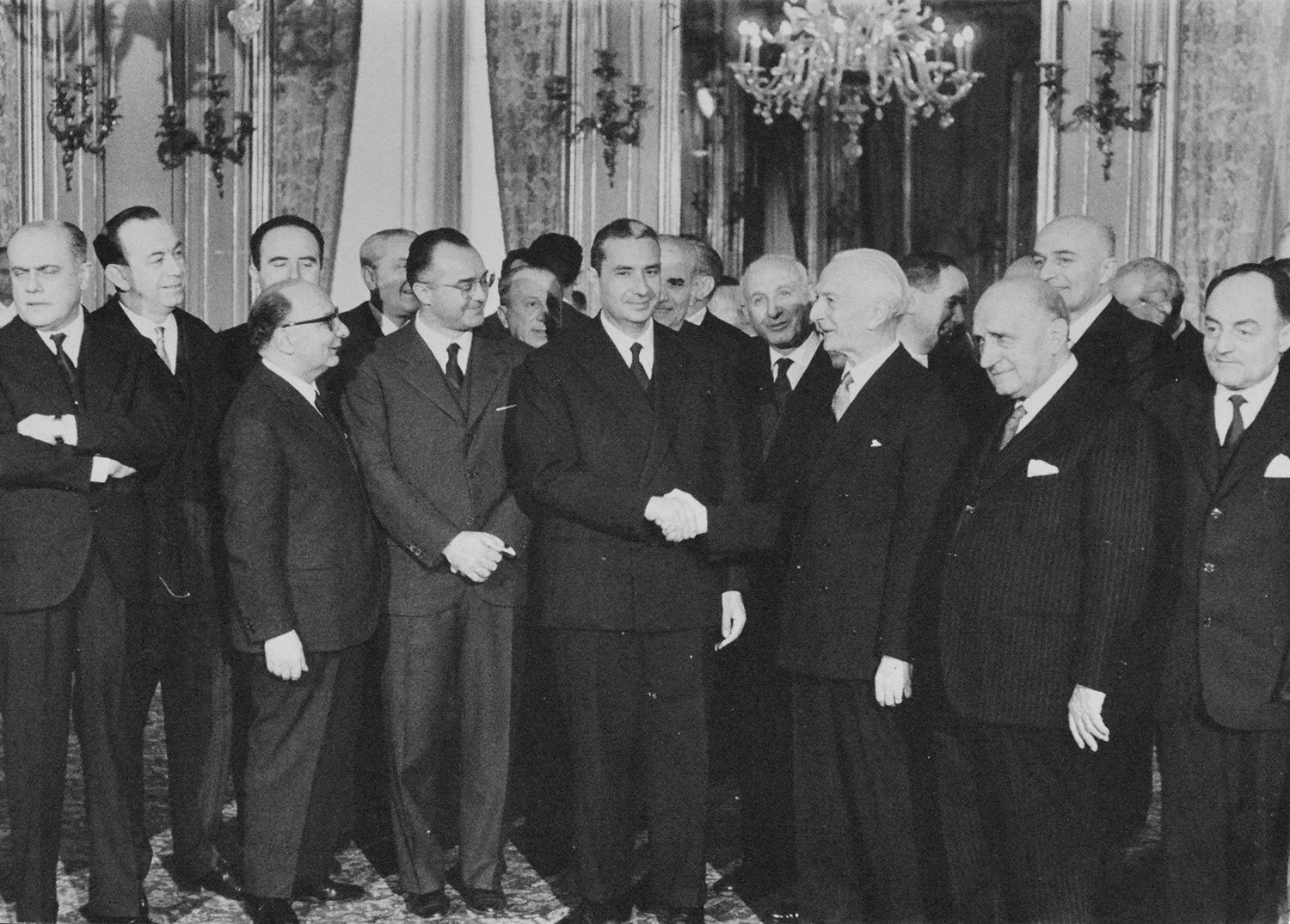
Moro I Cabinet sworn in at the Quirinal Palace in front of President Antonio Segni on 4 December 1963

During Moro's premiership, a wide range of social reforms were carried out. The 1967 Bridge Law (Legge Ponte) introduced urgent housing provisions as part of an envisioned reform of the entire sector, such as the introduction of minimum standards for housing and environment. A reform, promulgated on 14 December 1963, introduced an annual allowance for university students with income below a given level. Another law, promulgated on 10 March 1968, introduced voluntary public pre-elementary education for children aged three to five years. While a bill, approved on 21 July 1965, extended the program of social security. Moreover, the legal minimum wage was raised, all current pensions were revalued, seniority pensions were introduced (after 35 years of contributions workers could retire even before attaining pensionable age), and within the Social Security National Institute (INPS), a Social Fund (Fondo Sociale) was established, ensuring to all members pensioners a basic uniform pension largely financed by state, known as the "social pension". A law, approved on 22 July 1966, extended social security insurance to small traders, while law of 22 July 1966 extended health insurance to retired traders. Another important reform was implemented with a bill, approved on 29 May 1967, which extended compulsory health insurance to retired farmers, tenant farmers, and sharecroppers, and extended health insurance to the unemployed in receipt of unemployment benefits. Moreover, a law of 5 November 1968 extended family allowances to the unemployed who received unemployment benefits.

On 25 June 1964, the government was beaten on the budget law for the Italian Ministry of Education concerning the financing of private education, and on the same day Moro resigned. The right-wing Christian Democratic President of Italy, Antonio Segni, during the presidential consultations for the formation of a new cabinet, asked the socialist leader Pietro Nenni to exit from the government majority.

On 16 July, Segni sent the Carabinieri general, Giovanni De Lorenzo, to a meeting of representatives of DC, to deliver a message in case the negotiations around the formation of a new centre-left government would fail. According to some historians, De Lorenzo reported that President Segni was ready to give a subsequent mandate to the President of the Senate Cesare Merzagora, asking him of forming a "president's government", composed by all the conservative forces in the Parliament. Moro, on the other hand, managed to form another centre-left majority. During the negotiations, Nenni had accepted the downsizing of his reform programs and, on 17 July, Moro went to the Quirinal Palace, with the acceptance of the assignment and the list of ministers of his second government.

In August 1964, President Segni suffered a serious cerebral hemorrhage and resigned after a few months. In December presidential election, Moro and his majority tried to elect a leftist politician at the Quirinal Palace. On the twenty-first round of voting, the leader of the PSDI and former President of the Constituent Assembly Giuseppe Saragat was elected president. Saragat was the first left-wing politician to become President of the Republic.

Despite the opposition by Segni and other prominent rightist Christian Democrats, the centre-left coalition, the first one for the Italian post-war political life, stayed in power for nearly five years, until the 1968 general election, which was characterised by a defeat for DC's centre-left allies.

=== Presidential election ===
On 16 December 1964 the Parliament met to elect the fourth President of Italy. On 28 December 1964 the democratic socialist Giuseppe Saragat was elected on the twenty-first ballot with 646 votes out of 927.

== Government ==
Prime Minister	Party	Term of office		Government	Composition
Prime Minister	Party	Took office	Left office	Government	Composition
Giovanni Leone (1908–2001)	Christian Democracy	21 June 1963	4 December 1963	Leone I	DC (with PSDI, PRI and PSI's external support)
Aldo Moro (1916–1978)	Christian Democracy	4 December 1963	22 July 1964	Moro I	DC • PSI • PSDI • PRI (Organic Centre-left)
Aldo Moro (1916–1978)	Christian Democracy	22 July 1964	23 February 1966	Moro II	DC • PSI • PSDI • PRI (Organic Centre-left)
Aldo Moro (1916–1978)	Christian Democracy	23 February 1966	24 June 1968	Moro III	DC • PSI • PSDI • PRI (Organic Centre-left)

== Parliamentary composition ==
=== Chamber of Deputies ===
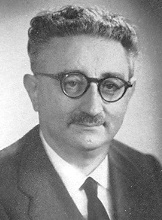
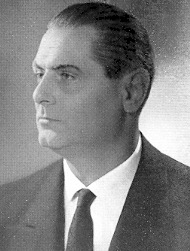
Presidents of the Chamber of Deputies: Giovanni Leone (1963) and Brunetto Bucciarelli-Ducci (1963–1968)
- Presidents:
  - Giovanni Leone (DC), elected on 16 May 1963 and resigned on 21 June 1963;
  - Brunetto Bucciarelli-Ducci (DC), elected on 26 June 1963.
- Vice Presidents: Brunetto Bucciarelli-Ducci (DC, until 26 June 1963), Paolo Rossi (PSDI), Maria Lisa Cinciari Rodano (PCI), Sandro Pertini (PSI), Francesco Restivo (DC, from 11 July 1963 till 23 February 1966), Guido Gonella (DC, from 28 April 1966)

Parliamentary groups in the Chamber of Deputies
Initial composition (16 May 1963)		Final composition (4 June 1968)		
Parliamentary group	Seats	Parliamentary group	Seats	Change
Christian Democracy	260	Christian Democracy	259	▼1
Italian Communist Party	166	Italian Communist Party	166	Steady
Italian Socialist Party	87	Unified Socialist Party	94	▼26
Italian Democratic Socialist Party	33	Unified Socialist Party	94	▼26
Italian Liberal Party	39	Italian Liberal Party	37	▼2
Italian Social Movement	27	Italian Social Movement	26	▼1
Italian Democratic Party of Monarchist Unity	8	Italian Democratic Party of Monarchist Unity	8	Steady
Italian Republican Party	6	Italian Republican Party	5	▼1
		Italian Socialist Party of Proletarian Unity	24	▲24
Mixed	4	Mixed	11	▲7
Südtiroler Volkspartei	3	Südtiroler Volkspartei	3	Steady
Union Valdôtaine	1	Union Valdôtaine	1	Steady
		Independent–Non inscrits	7	▲7
Total seats	630	Total seats	630	Steady

=== Senate of the Republic ===
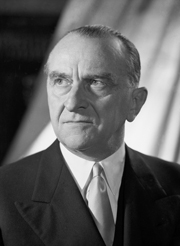
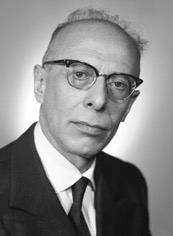
Presidents of the Senate: Cesare Merzagora (1963–1967) and Ennio Zelioli-Lanzini (1967–1968)
- Presidents:
  - Cesare Merzagora (Ind), elected on 16 May 1963 and resigned on 7 November 1967;
  - Ennio Zelioli-Lanzini (DC), elected on 8 November 1967.
- Vice Presidents: Giuseppe Spataro (DC), Domenico Macaggi (PSI, from 14 October 1964), Pietro Secchia (PCI), Ettore Tibaldi (PSI, till 7 October 1964), Ennio Zelioli-Lanzini (DC, till 8 November 1967),

Parliamentary groups in the Senate of the Republic
Initial composition (16 May 1963)		Final composition (4 June 1968)		
Parliamentary group	Seats	Parliamentary group	Seats	Change
Christian Democracy	133	Christian Democracy	129	▼3
Italian Communist Party	84	Italian Communist Party	84	Steady
Italian Socialist Party	44	Unified Socialist Party	43	▼15
Italian Democratic Socialist Party	14	Unified Socialist Party	43	▼15
Italian Liberal Party	18	Italian Liberal Party	18	Steady
Italian Social Movement	15	Italian Social Movement	14	▼1
		Italian Socialist Party of Proletarian Unity	10	▲10
Mixed	7	Mixed	16	▲9
Italian Democratic Party of Monarchist Unity	2	Italian Democratic Party of Monarchist Unity	2	Steady
Südtiroler Volkspartei	2	Südtiroler Volkspartei	2	Steady
Union Valdôtaine	1	Union Valdôtaine	1	Steady
Social Christian Sicilian Union	1	Social Christian Sicilian Union	1	Steady
Independents – Non inscrits	3	Independents – Non inscrits	12	▲9
Total seats	315	Total seats	315	Steady

==== Senators for Life ====
Senator	Motivation	Appointed by	From	Till
Umberto Zanotti Bianco	Merits in the artistic and social field	President Luigi Einaudi	Previous legislature	28 August 1963 (deceased)
Giuseppe Paratore	Merits in the social field	President Giovanni Gronchi	Previous legislature	26 February 1967 (deceased)
Giovanni Gronchi	Former President of Italy	ex officio	Previous legislature	Next legislature
Cesare Merzagora	Merits in the social field	President Antonio Segni	Previous legislature	Next legislature
Ferruccio Parri	Merits in the social field	President Antonio Segni	Previous legislature	Next legislature
Meuccio Ruini	Merits in the social and scientific field	President Antonio Segni	Previous legislature	Next legislature
Antonio Segni	Former President of Italy	ex officio	6 December 1964	Next legislature
Vittorio Valletta	Merits in the social field	President Giuseppe Saragat	28 November 1966	10 August 1967 (deceased)
Eugenio Montale	Merits in the literary field	President Giuseppe Saragat	13 June 1967	Next legislature
Giovanni Leone	Merits in the social field	President Giuseppe Saragat	27 August 1967	Next legislature
