= Legislature III of Italy =

3rd legislature of the Italian Republic (1958–1963)

Legislature III of Italy III legislatura della Repubblica Italiana
- 3rd legislature

Type
- Type: bicameral
- Houses: Chamber of Deputies; Senate of the Republic

History
- Founded: 12 June 1958
- Disbanded: 15 May 1963 (4 years, 337 days)
- Preceded by: II Legislature
- Succeeded by: IV Legislature

Leadership
- President of the Senate: Cesare Merzagora, Ind since 12 June 1958
- President of the Chamber of Deputies: Giovanni Leone, DC since 12 June 1958

Structure
- Seats: 596 (C); 246+ (S)
- Chamber of Deputies political groups: DC (273); PCI (140); PSI (84); MSI (24); PSDI (22); PLI (17); PMP (14); PNM (11); PRI (6); SVP (3); MC (1); UV (1)
- Senate political groups: DC (123); PCI (60); PSI (36); MSI (8); PMP (5); PSDI (5); PLI (4); PNM (2); SVP (2); Others (1)

Elections
- Chamber of Deputies voting system: Proportional
- Senate voting system: Proportional
- Last general election: 25 May 1958

Meeting place
- Palazzo Montecitorio, Rome (C)
- Palazzo Madama, Rome (S)

Website
- Third Legislature – Chamber of Deputies; Third Legislature – Senate

Constitution
- Constitution of Italy

The Legislature III of Italy (Italian: III Legislatura della Repubblica Italiana) was the 3rd legislature of the Italian Republic, and lasted from 12 June 1958 until 15 May 1963. Its composition was the one resulting from the general election of 25 May 1958.

== Main chronology ==
In the 1958 general election, Amintore Fanfani, as secretary of the Christian Democrats, run as the main candidate to become the next prime minister. The electoral result was similar to the one of five years before. Christian Democracy (DC) gained 42.4% of votes, nearly doubling Palmiro Togliatti's Communist Party, which arrived second. However, the poor results of the other small centrist and secular parties kept the same problems of political instability within the centrist coalition, which characterised the previous legislature.

Christian Democracy resulted even more polarized between Fanfani's leftist faction and the opposite one which urged for a rightist policy; Fanfani relaunched his reformist agenda, advocating for a dialogue with the Italian Socialist Party (PSI), which had stopped its ties with the communists after the Hungarian Revolution. However, a government between DC and PSI was too premature due to the strong opposition of DC's right-wing, so, on 1 July 1958, Fanfani sworn in as new prime minister at the head of a coalition government with the Italian Democratic Socialist Party (PSDI), and a case-by-case support of the Italian Republican Party (PRI).

The unprecedented concentration of power that Fanfani had achieved within this party was the main reason of his second government's decline. The outrageous conservative opposition resulted in a progressive breakdown of the internal majority faction, "Democratic Initiative". In January 1959, a conspicuous group of Christian Democrats started voting against their own government, forcing Fanfani to resign on 26 January 1959, after only six months in power.

On 16 February 1959, Antonio Segni, member of the right-wing faction of the party, sworn in as new prime minister. Segni formed a one-party government, composed only by members of the Christian Democracy, which was externally supported by minor centre-right and right-wing parties, included the neo-fascist Italian Social Movement (MSI). However, in March 1960, the Italian Liberal Party (PLI) withdrew its support to the government and Segni was forced to resign.

President Giovanni Gronchi then gave Fernando Tambroni the task of forming a new cabinet. Tambroni formed a one-party cabinet composed only by DC members, with the sole external support of the neo-fascist Italian Social Movement (MSI), a unique case in the history of the Italian Republic. On 8 April, the Chamber of Deputies gave the confidence vote to government, with the fundamental support of the MSI. However, the neo-fascist vital support created growing tensions within the DC and with some ministers who threatened their resignations, Tambroni was forced to resign. President Gronchi gave then the task of forming a new cabinet to Fanfani, to verify the possibility of starting a centre-left government. However, he was opposed by an important part of the DC, so Tambroni returned to the Senate, where he received the confidence vote on 29 April.

Tambroni listed among the main focus of his government's program the institution of regions with a special statute for Friuli-Venezia Giulia, the reform of local finances, the modernization of public administration, a wide program of social and economic interventions, the reorganization of the state railways and a new foreign policy to improve bilateral relations with emerging countries like China, India and Arab countries. However, the most controversial decision of his cabinet, was the permission to the MSI to hold its national congress in Genoa, one of the capitals of Italian Resistance against Fascism. This move was considered by the public opinion as a further and unacceptable opening to the neo-fascists, by the government.

On 30 June 1960, a large demonstration summoned by the left-wing CGIL trade union and by other leftist forces in the streets of Genoa was heavily suppressed by the Italian police. Other popular demonstrations in Reggio Emilia, Rome, Palermo, Catania, Licata again saw violent intervention by the police, causing several deaths. On 7 July, while news of the demonstrators killed in Reggio Emilia arrived in the Chamber, Tambroni only spoke about "unpleasant incidents", stating the government's willingness was to do "its duty to defend the state and the free institutions". Moreover, the interior minister, Giuseppe Spataro, accused the PCI of having stirred up the riots.

On 8 July, the political situation was so worrying that the president of the Senate, Cesare Merzagora, with an unprecedented practice and not informing the president of the Republic, proposed, finding support also in the president of the Chamber Giovanni Leone, a fifteen-day truce, with the return of the police to the barracks and the consequent stop of anti-fascist protests. This effectively delegitimized the actions of Tambroni and Spataro, and represented the beginning of the government crisis. On 19 July, when many members of his own party, withdrew their supports to the government, Tambroni was forced to resign, after only 116 days in power.

President Gronchi then decided to ask again Amintore Fanfani to forma new government. Fanfani's third government officially sworn in during July 1960 and was formed only by DC ministers. The cabinet was externally supported by PSDI, PRI and PLI. With Fanfani as prime minister and Aldo Moro as secretary of the party, the so-called Organic Centre-left period was ready to begin.

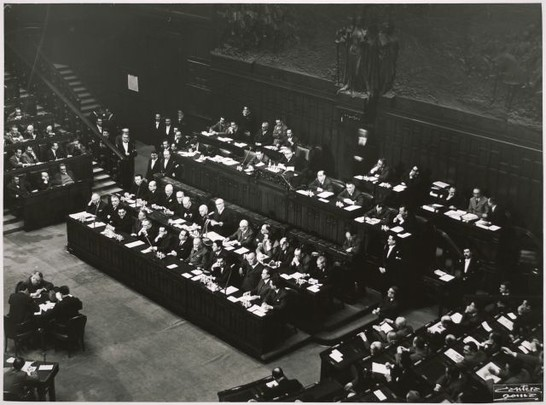
Fanfani IV Cabinet in front of the Chamber of Deputies in March 1962

In February 1962, after the national congress of the Christian Democracy, Fanfani reorganised his cabinet and gained the benign abstention of the socialist leader Pietro Nenni. During this term as Prime Minister Fanfani carried out a number of reforms in areas such as health, education, and social security. On 8 April 1962 the cabinet introduced broad provisions covering building areas. Local governments were obliged to provide plans of areas suitable for economic housing, while strict price controls for building areas were introduced to prevent speculation.

On 31 December 1962, the Parliament approved a law that extended compulsory education to the age of 14 and introduced a single unified curriculum, lasting for a 3-year period after primary education. On 12 August 1962, Fanfani introduced a supplementary pension payment, equal to one-twelfth of the annual amount of pension minima, while also introducing child supplements for pensioners. Moreover, on 5 March 1963, he introduced a voluntary pension insurance scheme for housewives. On 19 January 1963, the government proposed a bill that extended the insurance against occupational diseases to artisans, while general improvements to cash benefits were carried out: all pensions were to be adjusted every third year to the minimum contractual wage in the respective industrial sector, while earnings-replacement rates were raised to correspond to contractual disability rates. In February 1963, improved health benefits for agricultural workers, with the introduction of free pharmaceutical assistance and the flat-rate sickness indemnity replaced by an earnings-related indemnity equal to 50% of minimum contractual pay (in each province) for a maximum of 180 days.

In his three years rule, thanks to the key support of the PSI, Fanfani approved the nationalization of Enel, the national electric company and the establishment of middle school, the introduction of share taxation. Only the implementation of the ordinary statute regions and the urban reform remained uncompleted, due to a strong internal opposition within the DC. Moreover, the new international balance of power marked by the presidency of John F. Kennedy, influenced Western politics in favor of reformism, as the best alternative to defeat communism.

=== Presidential election ===
On 2 May 1962 the Parliament met to elect the third President of Italy. On 6 May 1962 the Christian democrat Antonio Segni was elected on the ninth ballot with 443 votes out of 854.

== Government ==
Prime Minister	Party	Term of office		Government	Composition
Prime Minister	Party	Took office	Left office	Government	Composition
Amintore Fanfani (1908–1999)	Christian Democracy	1 July 1958	16 February 1959	Fanfani II	DC • PSDI (Centrism)
Antonio Segni (1891–1972)	Christian Democracy	16 February 1959	25 March 1960	Segni II	DC (with MSI, PLI, PMP and PNM's external support)
Fernando Tambroni (1901–1963)	Christian Democracy	25 March 1960	26 July 1960	Tambroni	DC (with MSI's external support)
Amintore Fanfani (1908–1999)	Christian Democracy	26 July 1960	21 February 1962	Fanfani III	DC (with PSDI, PLI and PRI's external support)
Amintore Fanfani (1908–1999)	Christian Democracy	21 February 1962	21 June 1963	Fanfani IV	DC • PSDI • PRI (with PSI's external support)

Confidence votes

=== Fanfani II Cabinet ===
10–19 July 1958 Investiture votes for Fanfani II Cabinet
House of Parliament	Vote	Parties	Votes
Senate of the Republic (Voting: 241 of 257, Majority: 121)	Yes	DC, PSDI	128 / 241
Senate of the Republic (Voting: 241 of 257, Majority: 121)	No	PCI, PSI, PNM, PMP, PLI, MSI	111 / 241
Senate of the Republic (Voting: 241 of 257, Majority: 121)	Abstention	SVP	2 / 241
Chamber of Deputies (Voting: 582 of 596, Majority: 291)	Yes	DC, PSDI	295 / 582
Chamber of Deputies (Voting: 582 of 596, Majority: 291)	No	PCI, PSI, PLI, MSI, PRI, PNM, PMP, PLI	287 / 582

=== Segni II Cabinet ===
24 February–6 March 1959 Investiture votes for Segni II Cabinet
House of Parliament	Vote	Parties	Votes
Chamber of Deputies (Voting: 581 of 596, Majority: 291)	Yes	DC, MSI, PNM, PLI, PMP	333 / 581
Chamber of Deputies (Voting: 581 of 596, Majority: 291)	No	PCI, PSI, PRI, PSDI	248 / 581
Senate of the Republic (Voting: 240 of 257, Majority: 121)	Yes	DC, MSI, PNM, PLI, PMP	143 / 240
Senate of the Republic (Voting: 240 of 257, Majority: 121)	No	PCI, PSI, PSDI, SVP	97 / 240

=== Tambroni Cabinet ===
4–29 April 1960 Investiture votes for Tambroni Cabinet
House of Parliament	Vote	Parties	Votes
Chamber of Deputies (Voting: 593 of 596, Majority: 297)	Yes	DC, MSI	300 / 593
Chamber of Deputies (Voting: 593 of 596, Majority: 297)	No	PCI, PSI, PNM, PDI PLI, PRI, PSDI	293 / 593
Senate of the Republic (Voting: 238 of 257, Majority: 120)	Yes	DC, MSI	128 / 238
Senate of the Republic (Voting: 238 of 257, Majority: 120)	No	PCI, PSI, PNM, PDI, PLI, PSDI, SVP	110 / 238

=== Fafani III Cabinet ===
2–5 August 1960 Investiture votes for Fanfani III Cabinet
House of Parliament	Vote	Parties	Votes
Senate of the Republic (Voting: 220 of 257, Majority: 111)	Yes	DC, PLI, PSDI, SVP	126 / 220
Senate of the Republic (Voting: 220 of 257, Majority: 111)	No	PCI, MSI	58 / 220
Senate of the Republic (Voting: 220 of 257, Majority: 111)	Abstention	PSI, PNM, PDI	36 / 220
Chamber of Deputies (Voting: 446 of 590, Majority: 224)	Yes	DC, PLI, PRI, PSDI	310 / 446
Chamber of Deputies (Voting: 446 of 590, Majority: 224)	No	PCI, MSI	156 / 446

=== Fanfani IV Cabinet ===
2–15 March 1962 Investiture votes for Fanfani IV Cabinet
House of Parliament	Vote	Parties	Votes
Chamber of Deputies (Voting: 490 of 590, Majority: 246)	Yes	DC, PLI, PSDI, PRI	295 / 490
Chamber of Deputies (Voting: 490 of 590, Majority: 246)	No	PCI, MSI	195 / 490
Senate of the Republic (Voting: 190 of 257, Majority: 96)	Yes	DC, PLI, PSDI	122 / 190
Senate of the Republic (Voting: 190 of 257, Majority: 96)	No	PCI, MSI	68 / 190

== Parliamentary composition ==
=== Chamber of Deputies ===
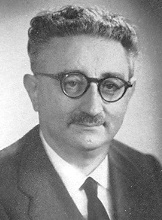
Giovanni Leone, President of the Chamber of Deputies

- President: Giovanni Leone (DC), elected on 12 June 1958
- Vice Presidents: Brunetto Bucciarelli-Ducci (DC), Paolo Rossi (PSDI), Girolamo Li Causi (PCI), Ferdinando Targetti (PSI)

Parliamentary groups in the Chamber of Deputies
Initial composition (12 June 1958)		Final composition (15 May 1963)		
Parliamentary group	Seats	Parliamentary group	Seats	Change
Christian Democracy	273	Christian Democracy	275	▲2
Italian Communist Party	143	Italian Communist Party	140	▼3
Italian Socialist Party	84	Italian Socialist Party	86	▲2
Italian Social Movement	24	Italian Social Movement	25	▲1
Italian Democratic Socialist Party	22	Italian Democratic Socialist Party	19	▼3
Italian Liberal Party	17	Italian Liberal Party	23	▲6
People's Monarchist Party	14	Italian Democratic Party	10	▼4
Monarchist National Party	11	Monarchist National Party	10	▼1
Mixed	11	Mixed	11	Steady
Italian Republican Party	6	Italian Republican Party	6	Steady
Südtiroler Volkspartei	3	Südtiroler Volkspartei	3	Steady
Community Movement	1	Community Movement	1	Steady
Union Valdôtaine	1	Union Valdôtaine	1	Steady
Total seats	596	Total seats	596	Steady

=== Senate of the Republic ===
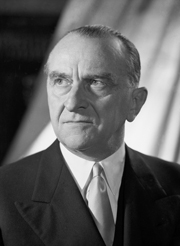
Cesare Merzagora, President of the Senate

- President: Cesare Merzagora (Ind), elected on 12 June 1958
- Vice Presidents: Stanislao Ceschi (DC), Giacinto Bosco (DC, until 25 July 1960), Mauro Scoccimarro (PCI), Ettore Tibaldi (PSI), Ennio Zelioli-Lanzini (DC, from 12 October 1960)

Parliamentary groups in the Senate of the Republic
Initial composition (12 June 1958)		Final composition (15 May 1963)		
Parliamentary group	Seats	Parliamentary group	Seats	Change
Christian Democracy	123	Christian Democracy	120	▼3
Italian Communist Party	60	Italian Communist Party	56	▼4
Italian Socialist Party	36	Italian Socialist Party	25	▼1
Social–Monarchist	10	Social–Monarchist	13	▲3
Mixed	28	Mixed	33	▲5
Italian Democratic Socialist Party	5	Italian Democratic Socialist Party	5	Steady
People's Monarchist Party	5	Italian Democratic Party	5	Steady
Italian Liberal Party	4	Italian Liberal Party	4	Steady
Südtiroler Volkspartei	2	Südtiroler Volkspartei	2	Steady
Independents – Non inscrits	12	Independents – Non inscrits	17	▲5
Total seats	257	Total seats	257	Steady

==== Senators for Life ====
Senator	Motivation	Appointed by	From	Till
Enrico De Nicola	Former President of Italy	ex officio	Previous legislature	3 October 1959 (deceased)
Pietro Canonica	Merits in the artistic field	President Luigi Einaudi	Previous legislature	8 June 1959 (deceased)
Pasquale Jannaccone	Merits in the social field	President Luigi Einaudi	Previous legislature	22 December 1959 (deceased)
Luigi Sturzo	Merits in the social field	President Luigi Einaudi	Previous legislature	8 August 1959 (deceased)
Umberto Zanotti Bianco	Merits in the artistic and social field	President Luigi Einaudi	Previous legislature	Next legislature
Luigi Einaudi	Former President of Italy	ex officio	Previous legislature	30 October 1961 (deceased)
Giuseppe Paratore	Merits in the social field	President Giovanni Gronchi	Previous legislature	Next legislature
Giovanni Gronchi	Former President of Italy	ex officio	11 May 1962	Next legislature
Cesare Merzagora	Merits in the social field	President Antonio Segni	2 March 1963	Next legislature
Ferruccio Parri	Merits in the social field	President Antonio Segni	2 March 1963	Next legislature
Meuccio Ruini	Merits in the social and scientific field	President Antonio Segni	2 March 1963	Next legislature
