= 1964 Italian presidential election =

Election of the President of the Italian Republic

← 1962	16–28 December 1964	1971 →

963 voters (320 Senators, 630 Deputies and 13 regional representatives) 642 (1st–3rd ballots) or 482 (4th ballot onwards) votes needed to win
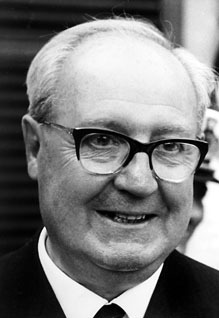
Nominee	Giuseppe Saragat
Party	PSDI
Electoral vote	646
Percentage	67.1%
President before election
Antonio Segni
DC
Elected President
Giuseppe Saragat
PSDI

The 1964 Italian presidential election was held in Italy from 16 to 28 December 1964, following the resignation of President Antonio Segni on 6 December 1964 due to health problems.

Only members of Parliament and regional delegates were entitled to vote, most of these electors having been elected in the 1963 general election. As head of state of the Italian Republic, the President has a role of representation of national unity and guarantees that Italian politics comply with the Italian Constitution, in the framework of a parliamentary system.

Only on the twenty-first round of voting Giuseppe Saragat, the leader of Italian Democratic Socialist Party and former President of the Constituent Assembly, was finally elected President. Saragat was the first left-wing politician to become President of the Republic.

== Procedure ==
In accordance with the Italian Constitution, the election was held in the form of a secret ballot, with the Senators and the Deputies entitled to vote. The election was held in the Palazzo Montecitorio, home of the Chamber of Deputies, with the capacity of the building expanded for the purpose. The first three ballots required a two-thirds majority of the 963 voters in order to elect a president, or 642 votes. Starting from the fourth ballot, an absolute majority was required for candidates to be elected, or 482 votes. The presidential mandate lasts seven years.

The election was presided over by the President of the Chamber of Deputies Brunetto Bucciarelli-Ducci, who proceeded to the public counting of the votes, and by the Vice president of the Senate Ennio Zelioli-Lanzini, since President Cesare Merzagora was serving as acting President of the Republic.

== Proposed nominees ==
- Giovanni Leone was the first proposal of the Christian Democracy;
- Umberto Terracini was proposed by the Italian Communist Party;
- Giuseppe Saragat was initially proposed only by Italian Socialist Party and the Italian Democratic Socialist Party;
- Amintore Fanfani was proposed by Christian Democracy's internal opposition;
- Gaetano Martino was proposed by the Italian Liberal Party;
- Pietro Nenni, former partisan and socialist leader, was proposed by left-wing parties from the tenth round of voting.

== Chronology ==
During summer 1964 the so-called Piano Solo prepared by general Giovanni De Lorenzo was conceived to make a coup d'état and overthrow the first centre-left government led by Aldo Moro. The coup was stopped before taking place, as the Italian Socialist Party agreed to reduce its more radical reformist claims. However, on 7 August 1964, during a heated discussion with the Prime Minister Moro and the leader of the Italian Democratic Socialist Party Giuseppe Saragat, President Antonio Segni suffered a serious cerebral hemorrhage in his office at the Quirinal Palace. He only partially recovered and decided to resign on 6 December 1964, citing health matters. Cesare Merzagora, as President of the Senate, became the acting President of the Republic till a new presidential election was called.

On 16 December 1964, the Italian Parliament convened to elect the new President after just two years since last presidential election occurred.

The official candidate of Christian Democracy was the former president of the Chamber of Deputies Giovanni Leone, whose candidacy was immediately contrasted by the former Prime Minister Amintore Fanfani, preferred by the left-wing faction of the party. As they did two years before, communists sustained again Umberto Terracini, while socialists decided to vote for the democratic socialist leader Giuseppe Saragat.

As the count advanced, both Leone and Fanfani decided to retire from the race, while socialists and communists found a common ground on the candidacy of the socialist leader and Deputy Prime Minister Pietro Nenni. Christian Democracy couldn't sustain Nenni since it'd have been meant to vote for a candidate voted by the communists themselves and thus finding the opposition of the more conservative social groups of the country.

After almost twenty rounds of voting, Christian Democracy decided to not oppose Saragat, a name then married also by socialists and communists. On the twenty-first ballot and after almost two weeks of voting, Giuseppe Saragat was finally elected President by a large margin and sworn in on 29 December 1964.

== Results ==
Candidate	First round 16 Dec 1964	Second round 16 Dec 1964	Third round 17 Dec 1964	Fourth round 17 Dec 1964	Fifth round 18 Dec 1964	Sixth round 19 Dec 1964	Seventh round 19 Dec 1964	Eighth round 20 Dec 1964	Ninth round 21 Dec 1964
Giovanni Leone	319	304	298	290	294	278	313	312	305
Umberto Terracini	250	251	253	249	252	249	251	252	250
Giuseppe Saragat	140	138	137	138	140	133	138	–	–
Gaetano Martino	55	56	56	54	54	53	–	–	–
Augusto De Marsanich	–	–	–	–	39	40	40	39	40
Alcide Malagugini	34	36	36	12	–	–	–	–	–
Amintore Fanfani	18	53	71	117	122	129	132	132	128
Paolo Emilio Taviani	11	8	–	–	–	–	–	–	–
Mario Scelba	6	6	–	–	–	–	–	–	–
Giulio Pastore	–	–	–	–	13	18	40	34	40
Paolo Rossi	–	–	–	–	–	–	–	34	16
Other candidates	19	14	31	8	7	10	7	13	3
Blank papers	39	34	36	28	25	36	26	22	17
Invalid papers	4	2	21	–	–	2	1	1	1
Abstentions	30	25	21	26	18	16	21	26	203
Total	963	963	963	963	963	963	963	963	963

Candidate	Tenth round 21 Dec 1964	Eleventh round 22 Dec 1964	Twelfth round 22 Dec 1964	Thirteenth round 23 Dec 1964	Fourteenth round 23 Dec 1964	Fifteenth round 24 Dec 1964	Sixteenth round 25 Dec 1964	Seventeenth round 26 Dec 1964
Giovanni Leone	299	382	401	393	406	386	–	–
Umberto Terracini	249	252	250	–	–	–	–	–
Giuseppe Saragat	–	–	6	–	8	–	–	10
Augusto De Marsanich	40	–	–	–	–	–	39	40
Alcide Malagugini	–	36	35	42	40	37	36	33
Amintore Fanfani	129	17	–	–	–	–	–	–
Giulio Pastore	40	–	–	–	–	–	–	–
Paolo Rossi	20	14	–	–	–	–	–	10
Pietro Nenni	96	98	104	351	353	348	349	346
Ludovico Montini	–	–	7	6	–	–	–	–
Other candidates	2	4	18	17	14	10	19	9
Blank papers	18	100	120	129	120	152	100	103
Invalid papers	–	1	4	6	1	2	1	1
Abstentions	116	59	18	19	28	28	419	414
Total	963	963	963	963	963	963	963	963

Candidate	Eighteenth round 26 December 1964	Nineteenth round 27 December 1964	Twentieth round 28 December 1964	Twenty-first round 28 December 1964
Giovanni Leone	7	–	–	–
Giuseppe Saragat	311	342	323	646
Gaetano Martino	60	63	59	56
Augusto De Marsanich	40	39	40	40
Amintore Fanfani	13	10	7	–
Paolo Rossi	13	8	7	7
Pietro Nenni	380	377	385	–
Other candidates	4	10	11	24
Blank papers	106	86	100	150
Invalid papers	5	1	–	4
Abstentions	24	27	31	36
Total	963	963	963	963
Source: Presidency of the Republic
