= 1962 Italian presidential election =

Election of the President of the Italian Republic

- 2–6 May 1962

854 voters (248 Senators, 596 Deputies and 10 regional representatives) 570 (1st–3rd ballots) or 428 (4th ballot onwards) votes needed to win
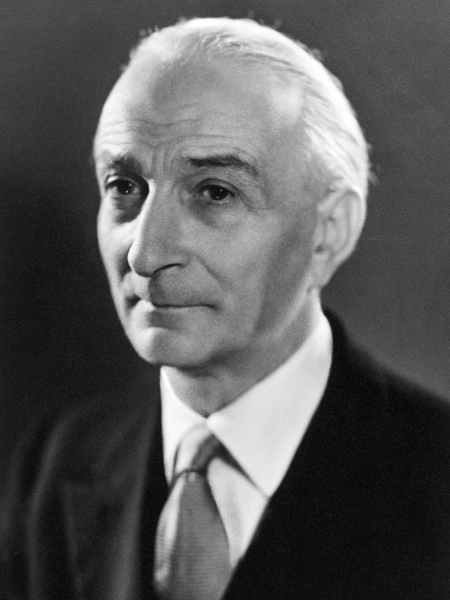

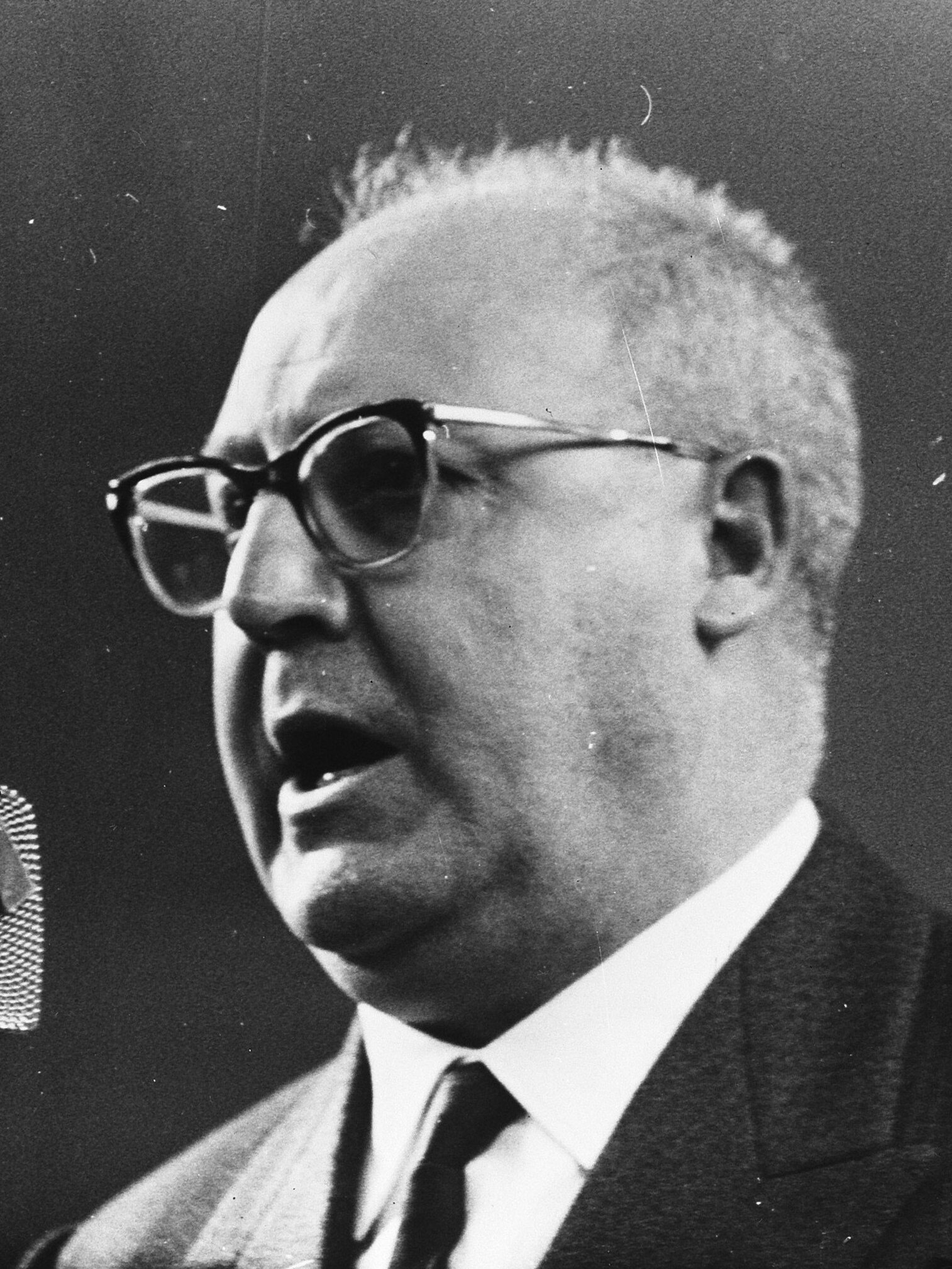
Nominee	Antonio Segni	Giuseppe Saragat
Party	DC	PSDI
Electoral vote	443	334
Percentage	51.9%	39.1%
President before election
Giovanni Gronchi
DC
Elected President
Antonio Segni
DC

The 1962 Italian presidential election was held in Italy on 2–6 May 1962.

Only members of Parliament and regional delegates were entitled to vote, most of these electors having been elected in the 1958 general election. As head of state of the Italian Republic, the President has a role of representation of national unity and guarantees that Italian politics comply with the Italian Constitution, in the framework of a parliamentary system.

It was the first time the official candidate of the Christian Democracy party was elected President of the Italian Republic.

== Procedure ==
In accordance with the Italian Constitution, the election was held in the form of a secret ballot, with the Senators and the Deputies entitled to vote. The election was held in the Palazzo Montecitorio, home of the Chamber of Deputies, with the capacity of the building expanded for the purpose. The first three ballots required a two-thirds majority of the 854 voters in order to elect a president, or 570 votes. Starting from the fourth ballot, an absolute majority was required for candidates to be elected, or 428 votes. The presidential mandate lasts seven years.

The election was presided over by the President of the Chamber of Deputies Giovanni Leone, who proceeded to the public counting of the votes, and by the President of the Senate Cesare Merzagora.

== Proposed nominees ==
- Antonio Segni, proposed by Christian Democracy, supported by Aldo Moro;
- Umberto Terracini, former President of the Constituent Assembly, sustained by the Communist Party;
- Giuseppe Saragat, leader of Democratic Socialist Party and former President of the Constituent Assembly;
- Giovanni Gronchi, outgoing President, not officially endorsed by the chairman of Eni, Enrico Mattei.

== Timeline ==
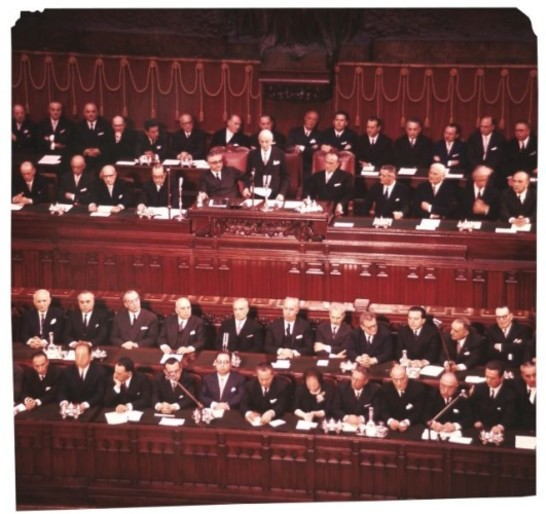
Antonio Segni taking the oath on 11 May 1962

On 2 May 1962, the Italian Parliament convened in order to elect the new President of the Republic, since President Giovanni Gronchi's term was about to end. Christian Democracy leader Aldo Moro decided to endorse the candidacy of Antonio Segni, former Prime Minister and member of the conservative faction of the party. With that choice, Moro wanted to reassure the conservatives representatives of his own party, worried about a possible extreme shift on leftist stances by their party after the beginning of the Organic centre-left period in February 1962.

Italian Communist Party decided to vote for Umberto Terracini on the first round, while Italian Socialist Party sustained Sandro Pertini. After the third round, communists and socialists decided to converge on the candidacy of the democratic socialist Giuseppe Saragat, who also gained the favor of some christian democrat snipers representatives.

After several ballots, on 6 May 1962 Antonio Segni was finally elected President with just the 51% of the votes. His election was allowed thanks to the votes of monarchist and neo-fascist representatives. It was the first time that Christian Democracy's official candidate succeeded in being elected President of the Republic.

== Results ==
Candidate	First round 2 May 1962	Second round 2 May 1962	Third round 2 May 1962	Fourth round 3 May 1962	Fifth round 4 May 1962	Sixth round 4 May 1962	Seventh round 5 May 1962	Eighth round 6 May 1962	Ninth round 6 May 1962
Antonio Segni	333	340	341	354	396	399	389	424	443
Umberto Terracini	200	196	–	–	–	–	–	–	–
Sandro Pertini	120	–	–	–	–	–	–	–	–
Augusto De Marsanich	46	–	–	–	–	–	–	–	–
Giuseppe Saragat	42	92	299	321	321	314	332	337	334
Giovanni Gronchi	20	32	44	45	43	43	29	20	–
Attilio Piccioni	12	41	51	40	28	17	–	–	–
Paolo Rossi	10	–	–	–	–	–	–	–	–
Achille Lauro	–	38	–	–	–	–	–	–	–
Cesare Merzagora	–	12	13	11	14	18	12	–	–
Calogero Volpe	–	–	37	–	–	–	–	–	–
Orazio Condorelli	–	–	–	38	–	–	–	–	–
Other candidates	8	15	11	8	3	4	15	17	13
Blank papers	43	65	46	26	35	46	58	45	51
Invalid papers	–	–	–	–	1	–	5	–	1
Abstentions	20	23	12	11	13	13	14	13	12
Total	854	854	854	854	854	854	854	854	854
Source: Presidency of the Republic
