= 1971 Italian presidential election =

Election of the President of the Italian Republic

← 1964	9–24 December 1971	1978 →

1,008 voters (320 Senators, 630 Deputies and 58 regional representatives) 673 (1st–3rd ballots) or 505 (4th ballot onwards) votes needed to win
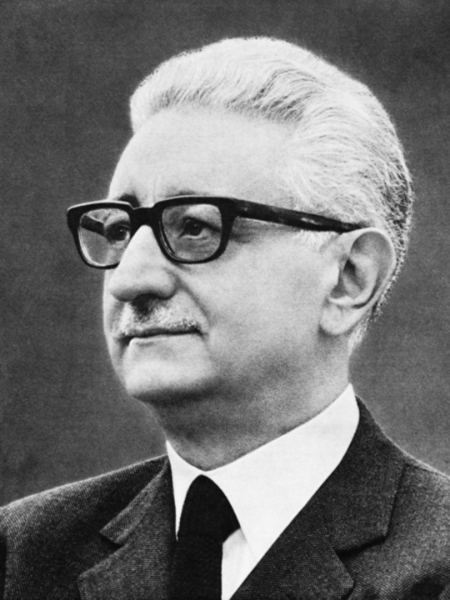

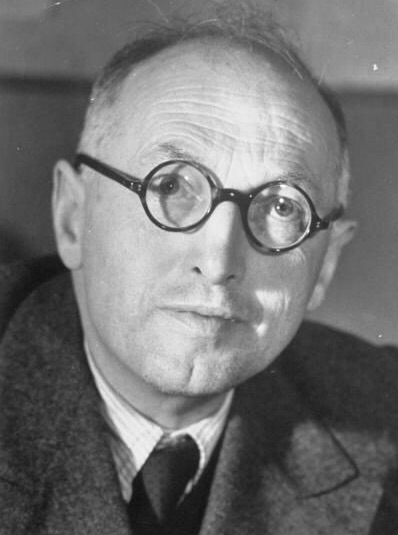
Nominee	Giovanni Leone	Pietro Nenni
Party	DC	PSI
Electoral vote	518	408
Percentage	51.4%	40.4%
President before election
Giuseppe Saragat
PSDI
Elected President
Giovanni Leone
DC

The 1971 Italian presidential election was held in Italy on 9–24 December 1971.

Only members of Parliament and regional delegates were entitled to vote, most of these electors having been elected in the 1968 general election and in the 1970 regional elections. As head of state of the Italian Republic, the President has a role of representation of national unity and guarantees that Italian politics comply with the Italian Constitution, in the framework of a parliamentary system.

On 24 December 1971 former Prime Minister and president of the Chamber of Deputies Giovanni Leone was elected president with 518 votes out of 1,008, the smallest majority ever obtained by an elected president. With twenty-three rounds of voting, this presidential election remains still today the longest presidential election in the Italian republican history.

== Procedure ==
In accordance with the Italian Constitution, the election was held in the form of a secret ballot, with the senators and the deputies entitled to vote. The election was held in the Palazzo Montecitorio, home of the Chamber of Deputies, with the capacity of the building expanded for the purpose. The first three ballots required a two-thirds majority of the 1,008 voters in order to elect a president, or 673 votes. Starting from the fourth ballot, an absolute majority was required for candidates to be elected, or 505 votes. The presidential mandate lasts seven years.

The election was presided over by the President of the Chamber of Deputies Sandro Pertini, who proceeded to the public counting of the votes, and by the President of the Senate Amintore Fanfani.

== Proposed nominees ==
- Francesco De Martino, former secretary of Italian Socialist Party, was the first proposal of the left-wing opposition parties;
- Amintore Fanfani, one of the most important leaders of Christian Democracy, was initially proposed by the centre-left government;
- Giovanni Leone, whose nomination emerged only since the twenty-second round of voting;
- Pietro Nenni, former partisan and leader of the socialists, proposed by left-wing parties at penultimate round of voting.

== Political background ==
The period from the late 1960 through the 1970s came to be known as the Opposti Estremismi (from left-wing and right-wing extremists' riots), later renamed anni di piombo ("years of lead") because of a wave of bombings and shootings. The first victim of this period was Antonio Annarumma, a policeman, killed on 12 November 1969 in Milan during a left-wing demonstration. In December 1969, four bombings struck in Rome the Monument of Vittorio Emanuele II (Altare della Patria), the Banca Nazionale del Lavoro, and in Milan the Banca Commerciale and the Banca Nazionale dell'Agricoltura. The later bombing, known as the Piazza Fontana bombing of 12 December 1969, killed 17 and injured 88. Social protests, in which the student movement was particularly active, shook Italy during the 1969 autunno caldo (Hot Autumn), leading to the occupation of the Fiat factory in Turin.

In December 1970, a neo-fascist coup, dubbed the Golpe Borghese, was planned by young far-right fanatics, elderly veterans of Italian Social Republic, and supported by members of the Corpo Forestale dello Stato, along with right-aligned entrepreneurs and industrialists. The "Black Prince", Junio Valerio Borghese, took part in it. The coup, called off at the last moment, was discovered by the newspaper Paese Sera, and publicly exposed three months later.

In this extremely difficult context for republican institutions, on 9 December 1971 Italian Parliament convened to elect a new President. As a result of the 1968 general election, left-wing parties had now more representatives in the Parliament, while Christian Democracy had shrunk its numbers, making it more difficult to elect the new President without the help of its centre-left allies.

After a long voting period which lasted almost two weeks, the Christian democrat Giovanni Leone managed to be elected President with the votes of the Christian Democracy and the neo-fascist Italian Social Movement, facing the extreme opposition of the left-wing parties.

== Results ==
Candidate	First round 9 Dec 1971	Second round 9 Dec 1971	Third round 10 Dec 1971	Fourth round 11 Dec 1971	Fifth round 12 Dec 1971	Sixth round 12 Dec 1971	Seventh round 13 Dec 1971	Eighth round 13 Dec 1971	Ninth round 14 Dec 1971
Francesco De Martino	397	398	404	411	399	413	408	411	407
Amintore Fanfani	384	368	384	377	385	378	–	–	–
Giovanni Malagodi	49	50	50	50	51	48	50	52	47
Giuseppe Saragat	45	46	51	50	51	50	51	50	55
Augusto De Marsanich	42	39	38	42	43	–	–	–	–
Mariano Rumor	–	–	–	–	–	6	–	–	–
Other candidates	12	8	4	3	4	7	2	2	4
Blank papers	57	77	62	64	62	91	51	48	48
Invalid papers	1	–	–	–	–	3	–	1	2
Abstentions	21	22	15	11	13	12	446	444	445
Total	1,008	1,008	1,008	1,008	1,008	1,008	1,008	1,008	1,008

Candidate	Tenth round 14 Dec 1971	Eleventh round 15 Dec 1971	Twelfth round 15 Dec 1971	Thirteenth round 16 Dec 1971	Fourteenth round 17 Dec 1971	Fifteenth round 18 Dec 1971	Sixteenth round 18 Dec 1971	Seventeenth round 19 Dec 1971
Francesco De Martino	404	407	394	407	406	400	393	397
Amintore Fanfani	–	393	–	–	–	–	6	5
Giovanni Malagodi	48	48	–	–	–	–	–	–
Giuseppe Saragat	56	56	48	49	49	42	–	–
Pietro Nenni	–	–	–	–	–	–	7	–
Sandro Pertini	–	–	–	–	–	–	5	7
Other candidates	3	22	14	9	5	9	3	6
Blank papers	50	60	62	48	15	19	10	13
Invalid papers	2	2	1	1	–	2	1	–
Abstentions	445	20	490	494	533	536	583	580
Total	1,008	1,008	1,008	1,008	1,008	1,008	1,008	1,008

Candidate	Eighteenth round 20 December 1971	Nineteenth round 21 December 1971	Twentieth round 21 December 1971	Twenty-first round 22 December 1971	Twenty-second round 23 December 1971	Twenty-third round 24 December 1971
Francesco De Martino	402	390	402	400	–	–
Giuseppe Saragat	–	–	–	–	7	–
Pietro Nenni	–	9	–	–	408	408
Sandro Pertini	7	10	–	6	6	6
Giovanni Leone	–	–	–	–	503	518
Other candidates	7	6	10	7	19	25
Blank papers	12	17	15	17	46	36
Invalid papers	–	–	–	–	2	3
Abstentions	579	576	581	578	17	12
Total	1,008	1,008	1,008	1,008	1,008	1,008
Source: Presidency of the Republic

== Inauguration ==
Giovanni Leone officially sworn in as the new President of Italy on 29 December 1971.

=== Gallery ===
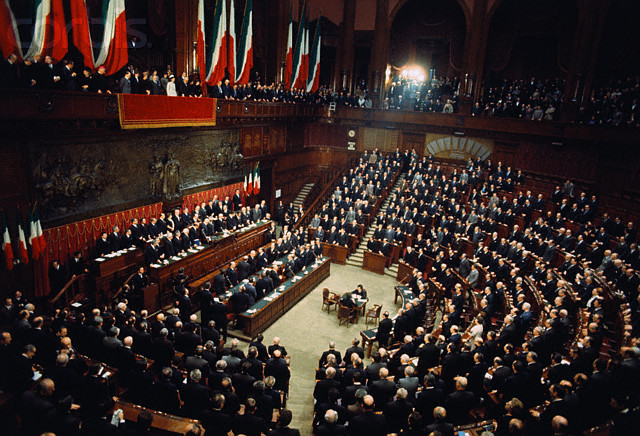
Leone taking the oath in front of the Parliament

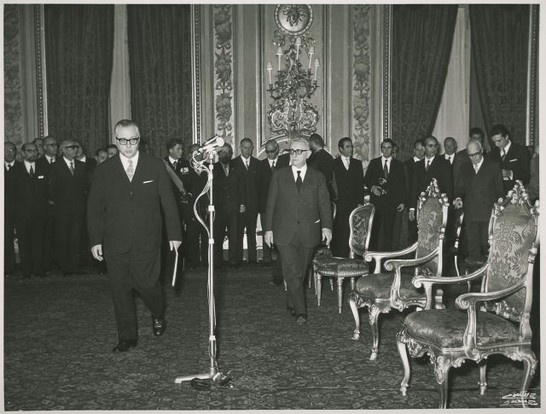
Leone arrives at the Quirinal Palace for the swearing in ceremony

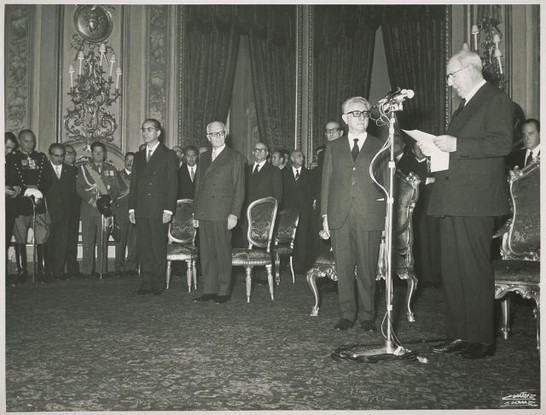
Leone and Saragat during the swearing in ceremony
