= Gronchi (surname) =

Gronchi is an Italian surname.

== Geographical distribution ==
As of 2014, 87.5% of all known bearers of the surname Gronchi were residents of Italy (frequency 1:32,278), 8.8% of France (1:350,040) and 1.2% of Argentina (1:1,583,093).

In Italy, the frequency of the surname was higher than national average (1:32,278) only in one region: Tuscany (1:2,163).

== People ==
- Giovanni Gronchi (1887–1978), President of Italy
