= Umberto Terracini =

Italian politician (1895–1983)

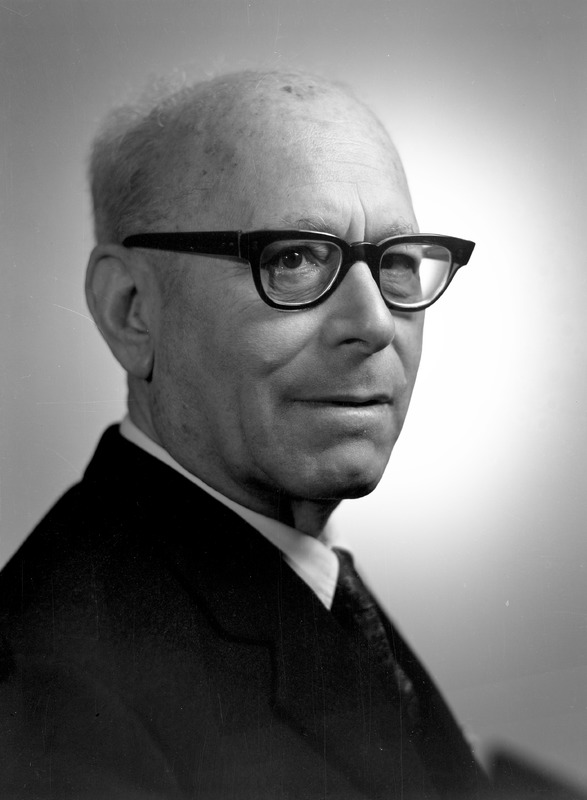
- Official portrait, 1963

President of the Constituent Assembly
- In office 8 February 1947 – 31 January 1948
- Preceded by: Giuseppe Saragat
- Succeeded by: Giovanni Gronchi

Member of the Senate of the Republic
- In office 25 June 1953 – 6 December 1983
- Constituency: Liguria (1953–1958); Tuscany (1958–1983)
- In office 8 May 1948 – 24 June 1953 (Ex officio)

Member of the Constituent Assembly
- In office 25 June 1946 – 31 January 1948
- Constituency: Genoa

Personal details
- Born: Umberto Elia Terracini; 27 July 1895 Genoa, Kingdom of Italy
- Died: 6 December 1983 (aged 88) Rome, Italy
- Party: Italian Communist Party
- Spouse: Maria Laura Rocca (m. 1948)
- Education: University of Turin
- Profession: Lawyer

Umberto Elia Terracini (Italian pronunciation: [umˈbɛrto eˈliːa terraˈtʃiːni]; 27 July 1895 – 6 December 1983) was an Italian politician.

== Biography ==
=== Early years ===
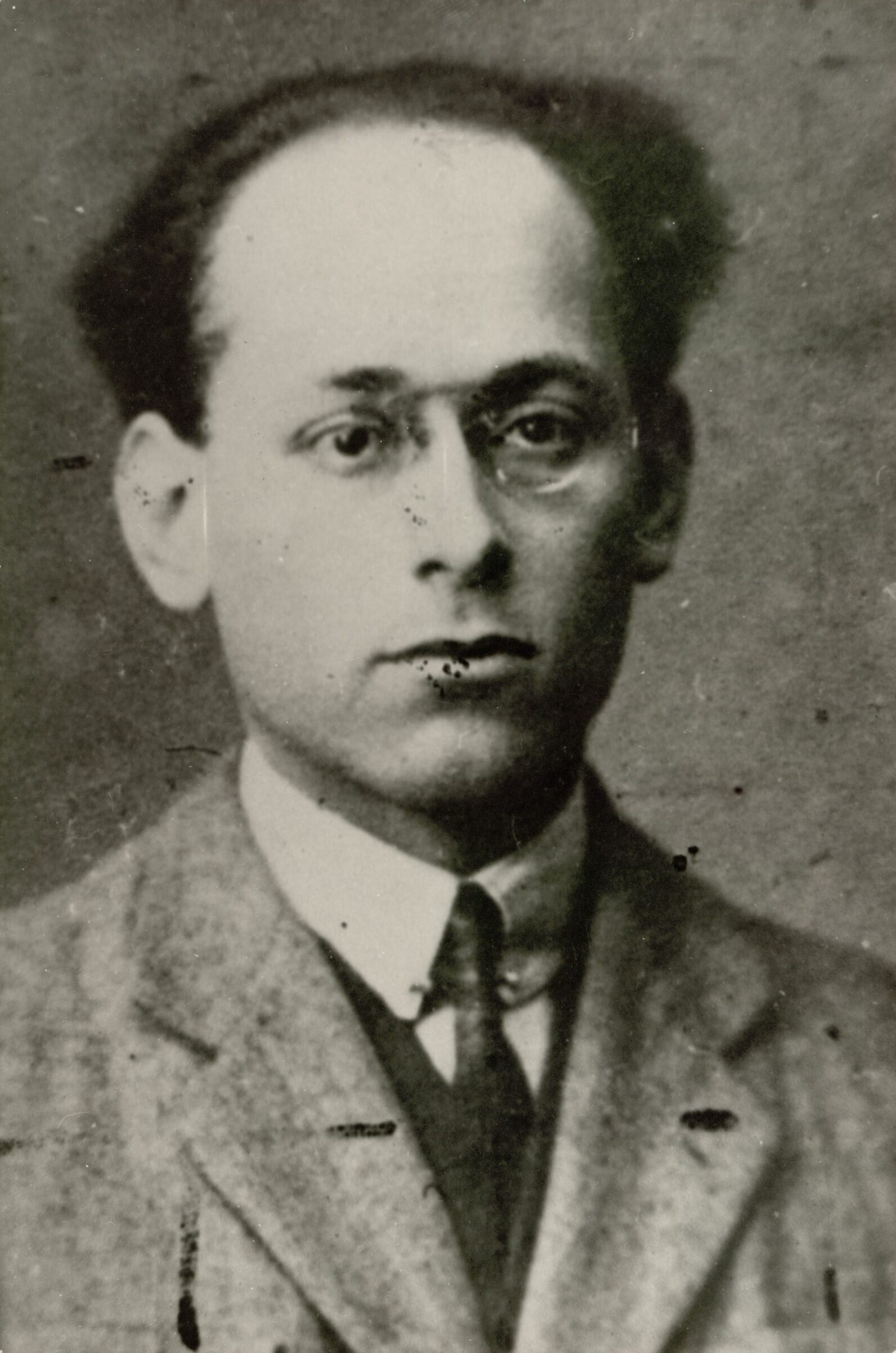
A young Terracini

Terracini was born in Genoa, Liguria, on 27 July 1895 to a Jewish family originally from Piedmont. After completing his elementary education, Terracini attended a Jewish school, whose programs corresponded to the ministerial ones, except for the addition of the study of the language and the history of Israel; he did not derive any religious interest from his family or school, even though he regularly attended the synagogue. In those years, he began to attend the Civic Library, reading popular novels of authors like Victor Hugo, Edmondo De Amicis, Émile Zola and Eugène Sue.

Before the beginning of World War I, he approached the Italian Socialist Party and in 1913 he was enrolled in the Faculty of Law of the University of Turin. Terracini immediately expressed his opposition to Italy's entry into the war. After a pacifist rally he held on 15 September 1916 he was arrested and sentenced to a month in prison. After release he was drafted and sent to the front in 1917 near Montebelluna.

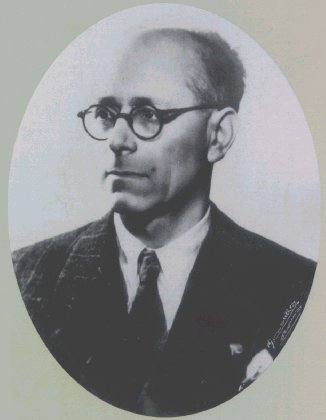
Terracini c. 1945

After the war, Terracini resumed his studies graduating in 1919 and began his career as a lawyer. He also befriended Antonio Gramsci and Palmiro Togliatti, whom he worked as an aide for; the three of them would found L'Ordine Nuovo in 1919. In 1921 Terracini, under Gramsci and Togliatti, contributed to the foundation of the Communist Party of Italy. In September 1926, Terracini was arrested as an opponent of the fascist regime and sentenced to 22 years of prison: he spent 11 years in jail and subsequently was held in confinement in Ponza and on Santo Stefano Island. He was freed by the partisans in 1943. In those years he expressed his opposition to the Molotov–Ribbentrop Pact.

=== Constituent Assembly ===
Terracini was elected a Deputy and vice-president of the Constituent Assembly in 1946, representing the Italian Communist Party (PCI). He became president of the Assembly after the resignation of Giuseppe Saragat the following year. He signed the Italian Constitution along with the Head of State Enrico De Nicola and the Prime Minister Alcide De Gasperi.

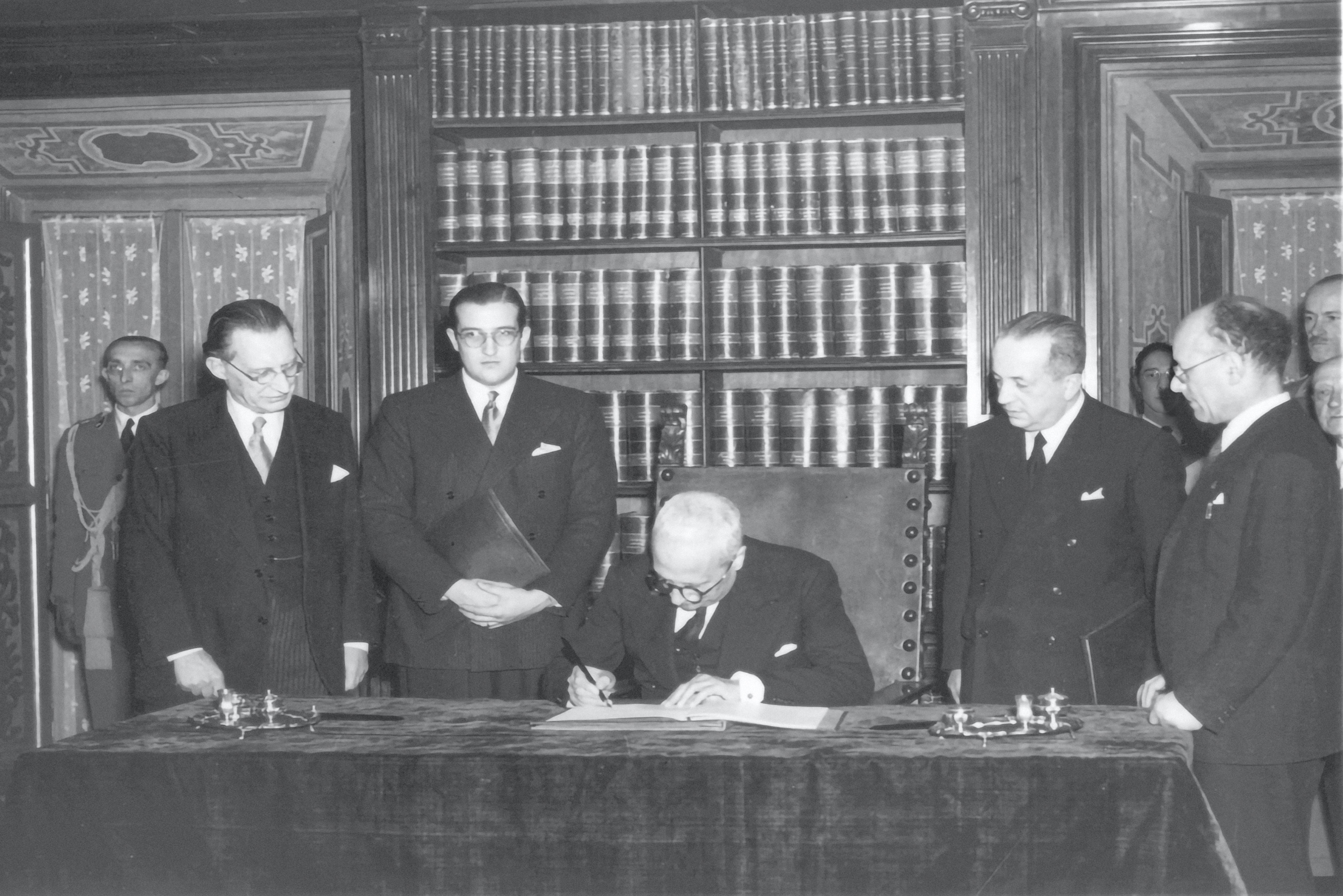
Enrico De Nicola signs the Italian Constitution on 27 December 1947. Terracini is at the far right.

=== Later years ===
Terracini was favourable to the alliance with the Italian Socialist Party in the Popular Democratic Front, and after the shooting on Togliatti in July 1948, he presented a no-confidence motion to the government led by the Christian Democrats, whom he believed were morally responsible for the attack on the Communist leader.

Terracini was very critical with Nikita Khrushchev for his report on war crimes committed by Stalin, arguing that the secretary of the CPSU was too soft on his predecessor. He supported the intervention of Soviet troops against the Hungarian Revolution of 1956.

Terracini confirmed his seat in the Senate of the Republic from 1948 until his death. He became the party's candidate for President of Italy at the 1962 elections and the 1964 elections, but was defeated by Antonio Segni first and then by Giuseppe Saragat.

During the 1970s he was very critical of the Historic Compromise between the Italian Communist Party and the Christian Democrats.

Terracini died in Rome on 6 December 1983, at the age of 88.

== Electoral history ==
Election	House	Constituency	Party	Votes	Result
1946	Constituent Assembly	Genoa–Imperia–La Spezia–Savona	PCI	73,186	Elected
1953	Senate of the Republic	Liguria – Genoa I	PCI	47,172	Elected
1958	Senate of the Republic	Tuscany – Livorno	PCI	68,314	Elected
1963	Senate of the Republic	Tuscany – Livorno	PCI	82,715	Elected
1968	Senate of the Republic	Tuscany – Florence II	PCI	87,809	Elected
1972	Senate of the Republic	Tuscany – Livorno	PCI	103,322	Elected
1976	Senate of the Republic	Tuscany – Livorno	PCI	113,894	Elected
1979	Senate of the Republic	Tuscany – Livorno	PCI	110,930	Elected
1983	Senate of the Republic	Tuscany – Livorno	PCI	108,661	Elected

Political offices
Preceded by Giuseppe Saragat	President of the Constituent Assembly; 1947–1948	Succeeded by Giovanni Gronchi as President of the Chamber of Deputies
