= Attilio Di Napoli =

Italian Socialist politician

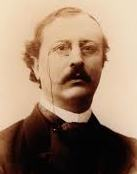

Minister of Industry and Commerce of the Kingdom of Italy
- In office 22 April 1944 – 8 June 1944
- Preceded by: Epicarmo Corbino
- Succeeded by: Giovanni Gronchi

Member of the Chamber of Deputies of the Kingdom of Italy
- In office 11 June 1921 – 25 January 1924

Personal details
- Born: 4 June 1883 Melfi, Kingdom of Italy
- Died: 2 December 1953 (aged 70) Melfi, Italy
- Party: Italian Socialist Party

Attilio Di Napoli (Melfi, 4 June 1883 – 2 December 1953) was an Italian politician, leader of the Italian Socialist Party in Lucania in the early 20th century. He was elected to the Italian Chamber of Deputies in the early 1920s, and after being persecuted under the Fascist regime, he became Minister of Industry, Commerce and Labour of the Badoglio II Cabinet.

== Biography ==
He was born in Melfi on 4 June 1883, into a middle-class family, and after graduating in law he joined the Italian Socialist Party in the early 1900s, soon becoming its leader in his hometown, as well as secretary of the Peasants' League and of the local Socialist circle. He founded and directed the weekly magazine Il Lavoratore, and often sent political news from Melfi to the Avanti!, keeping a close correspondence with Enrico Ferri and Ettore Ciccotti. He was a very active organizer and lecturer, and often held anti-clerical speeches; in 1911–1912 he was one of the leaders of the protest against the Italo-Turkish War in Basilicata, organizing rallies and processions against the war and the increase of food prices, and in support of disarmament and universal suffrage. In 1913, before the political elections, a consistent peasants' movement developed in Basilicata, and Di Napoli was elected mayor of Melfi.

In the following years he was one of the leaders of the peasants' movement, campaigning for wage increases, reduced working hours and collective land lease contracts without the mediation of sub-licensors. In 1914 he was elected to the provincial council of Potenza; on 24 May of the same year the prefect of Potenza described him in a confidential note as "a very turbulent element who has acquired a dangerous influence on the masses". After the outbreak of the First World War he was an outspoken advocate of Italy's neutrality, and continued to campaign for peace even after Italy's entry into the war, which led to Il Lavoratore being suspended by the government in 1917 (the reason given being "With the publication of this magazine it was proposed to depress the public spirit in the current political moment, also favoring the peace proposals of the central empires"). In 1919, after the end of the war, Di Napoli was at the head of the unrest against the increase in food prices in the Melfi area.

In January 1921, at the XVII Congress of the Italian Socialist Party (which would result in the split-up of the hardliner faction, which gave birth to the Italian Communist Party), he attacked the Communist fraction, stating that their split-up would result in the weakening of the workers' movement, and that their insistence on revolutionary violence would have done nothing but plunge more people into hunger and in misery. In the same year he was elected to the Italian Chamber of Deputies with the Italian Socialist Party. Following the advent of Fascism, Di Napoli was repeatedly targeted by squadrist violence; in 1924, after the end of his term as a deputy, he was prevented from returning from Rome to Melfi, and on 20 May 1927 the Provincial Commission of Potenza ordered his arrest and confinement, but he appealed the decision and it was revoked and replaced by a cease and desist order.

During the twenty years of the Fascist regime he was kept under close scrutiny by the police; he was able to resume his political activities after the fall of Fascism in 1943, and in 1944 he was appointed Minister of Industry and Commerce in the second Badoglio cabinet. He was later made a member of the High Court of Justice for the sanctions against Fascism. In 1945 he entered the National Council, where he became part of the Foreign Affairs Commission. In 1946 he ran as a candidate for the Constituent Assembly, but was not elected. He died in Melfi on 2 December 1953.
