= Giovanni Leone =

President of Italy from 1971 to 1978

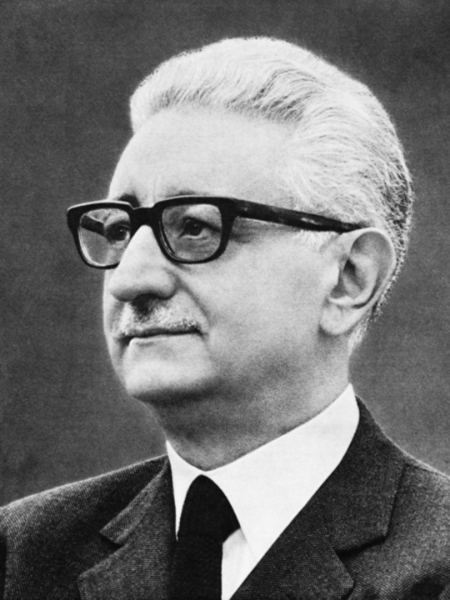
- Official portrait, c. 1974

President of Italy
- In office 29 December 1971 – 15 June 1978
- Prime Minister: Emilio Colombo; Giulio Andreotti; Mariano Rumor; Aldo Moro; Giulio Andreotti
- Preceded by: Giuseppe Saragat
- Succeeded by: Sandro Pertini

Prime Minister of Italy
- In office 25 June 1968 – 13 December 1968
- President: Giuseppe Saragat
- Preceded by: Aldo Moro
- Succeeded by: Mariano Rumor
- In office 22 June 1963 – 5 December 1963
- President: Antonio Segni
- Deputy: Attilio Piccioni
- Preceded by: Amintore Fanfani
- Succeeded by: Aldo Moro

President of the Chamber of Deputies
- In office 10 May 1955 – 21 June 1963
- Preceded by: Giovanni Gronchi
- Succeeded by: Brunetto Bucciarelli-Ducci
Parliamentary offices
Member of the Senate of the Republic
Ex officio
Life tenure 15 June 1978 – 9 November 2001
Life tenure 27 August 1967 – 29 December 1971
Appointed by	Giuseppe Saragat
Member of the Chamber of Deputies
In office 8 May 1948 – 26 August 1967
Constituency	Naples–Caserta
Member of the Constituent Assembly
In office 25 June 1946 – 31 January 1948
Constituency	Naples–Caserta

Personal details
- Born: 3 November 1908 Naples, Campania, Kingdom of Italy
- Died: 9 November 2001 (aged 93) Rome, Lazio, Italy
- Party: DC (1944–1994); Independent (1994–2001)
- Height: 1.54 m (5 ft 1 in)
- Spouse: Vittoria Michitto (m. 1946)
- Children: 4
- Education: University of Naples Federico II

Giovanni Leone (Italian: [dʒoˈvanni leˈoːne]; 3 November 1908 – 9 November 2001) was an Italian politician, jurist and university professor who was the president of Italy from 1971 to 1978. A founding member of Christian Democracy (DC), Leone briefly served as Prime Minister of Italy from June to December 1963 and again from June to December 1968. He was also President of the Chamber of Deputies from 1955 to 1963.

Leone was the first Italian president to resign because of a scandal. In 1978, he was accused of bribery amid the Lockheed bribery scandals; the allegations were later declared false, and he was rehabilitated.

== Early life ==
Leone was born in Naples in 1908 to Mauro Leone and Maria Gioffredi, both from Pomigliano d'Arco, his father, Mauro Leone, was a prominent lawyer, and had participated in the foundation of the Italian People's Party in Campania. Leone grew up in Pomigliano d'Arco, where he attended the classic lyceum, graduating in 1924.

In 1929, he graduated in law from the prestigious University of Naples Federico II, with the thesis "Violation of family care obligations", which was even published in 1931. In the following year, he also obtained a degree in social and political science. During university, Leone became a member of Catholic Action (AC). After graduation, he started working in the law firm of Enrico De Nicola, also becoming a professor of criminal procedure at the University of Camerino.

During the 1930s, he became one of the most prominent lawyers and jurists in Southern Italy, teaching at the Universities of Messina, Bari and Naples. In these years, he was also elected president of the Italian section of the International Association of Penal Law, as well as a member of the executive committee.

During World War II, he became a magistrate of the military court of Naples, with the rank of lieutenant colonel. In the aftermath of September 1943 armistice, during the dramatic days of the Nazi occupation, he worked effectively for the release of numerous political prisoners and deserters, thus removing them from possible reprisals. In these years, thanks to a colleague, he met Vittoria Michitto, belonging to one of the best known families of Caserta, whom he married in July 1946. The couple had four sons: Mauro, Paolo, Giancarlo and Giulio, who died at the age of 4.

== Political career ==
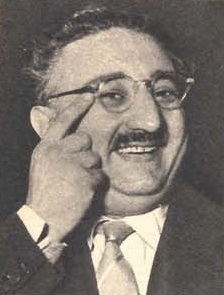
Leone in 1953

In 1943, along with his father, Leone was among the founders of the Christian Democracy (DC), the PPI's heir led by Alcide De Gasperi. After two years, in 1945, he was elected DC's provincial secretary for Naples, immediately becoming one of the leading figures of the party.

In 1946, Leone was among the main supporters of the "neutrality" in the 1946 institutional referendum, in which Italians voted to abolish the monarchy of the House of Savoy. In the same year, he was elected with nearly 32,000 votes to the Constituent Assembly for the constituency of Naples–Caserta. As a prominent jurist, he was appointed in the commission with the aim of drawing up the new republican constitution.

In April 1948, he was elected to the Chamber of Deputies with 60,000 votes. Even as a deputy, he continued working as a lawyer and teaching at the university, considering for a long time these occupations as priority aspects of his life. Also for this reason, according to some testimonies, he often expressed the desire not to take on government positions. Being able to count on his own reliable and territorially rooted electorate, Leone practically never conducted a real party activity. He remained substantially foreign to the large and small factions in which the DC quickly split up, although he could be considered close to the party's conservative wing.

=== President of the Chamber of Deputies ===
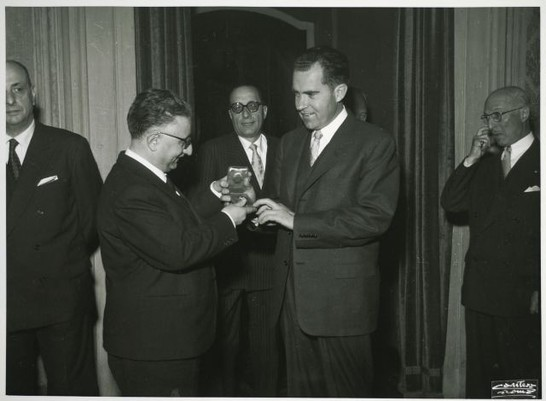
Leone with then U.S. Vice President Richard Nixon in 1957

Thanks to his super partes position, the respect of all DC's internal factions, alongside the undoubted consideration gained also from the other political forces during the works of the Constituent Assembly, in 1950, Leone assumed the position of Vice President of the Chamber of Deputies and then, from May 1955, the one of President, which he held continuously until June 1963.

"As president, he demonstrated, in addition to a strong sense of the institutions and a scrupulous respect for the rules of democratic confrontation, a remarkable ability to govern parliamentary dynamics, also mastered through that undeniable presence of spirit, contributed in making him a well-known figure in the public opinion. At the same time, he was able to gain approval for his action both within the party, which found him a reliable manager of parliamentary processes, and outside DC, among the majority's parties but also in the oppositions, which appreciated his qualities of institutional balance".

== Prime Minister of Italy ==
=== First term ===
In the 1963 general election, the Christian Democrats lost almost one million votes, gaining nearly 38%, while the Italian Communist Party (PCI) arrived second with 25%. However the Italian Liberal Party (PLI) surged to 7%, their best results ever, receiving many votes from former Christian Democratic supporters, who were against Amintore Fanfani's centre-left policies. With the decline of electoral support, on 22 June 1963, the majority of DC members decided to replace Fanfani with a provisional government led by Leone.

Leone formed a one-party cabinet, composed only by DC's members and externally supported by Italian Socialist Party (PSI), Italian Republican Party (PRI) and Italian Democratic Socialist Party (PSDI). The cabinet was also known as "Bridge Government" (Governo ponte), as a transitional government, with the aim of starting a tighter cooperation with the PSI.

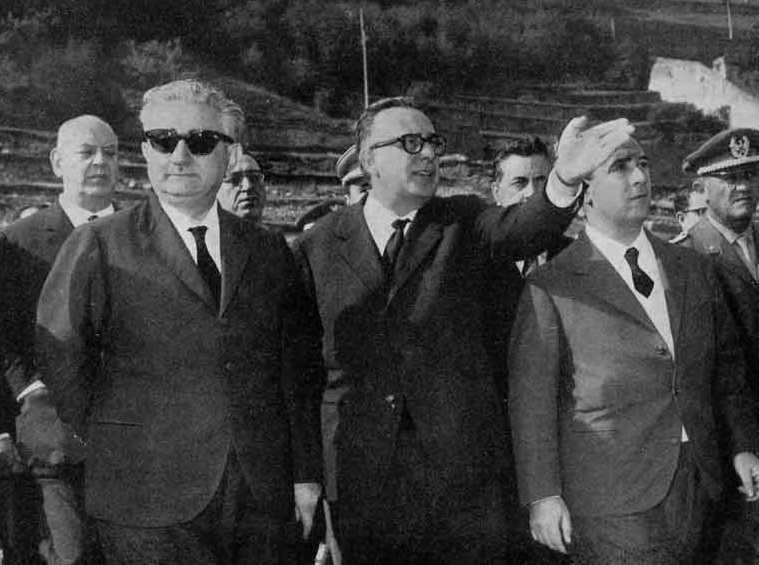
Leone and Mariano Rumor visiting the site of the Vajont Dam disaster

As prime minister, Leone had to face one of the most tragic events in Italian republican history, the Vajont Dam disaster. On 9 October 1963, a landslide occurred on Monte Toc, in the province of Pordenone. The landslide caused a megatsunami in the artificial lake in which 50 million cubic metres of water overtopped the dam in a wave of 250 metres (820 ft), leading to the complete destruction of several villages and towns, and 1,917 deaths. In the previous months, the Adriatic Society of Electricity (SADE) and the Italian government, which both owned the dam, dismissed evidence and concealed reports describing the geological instability of Monte Toc on the southern side of the basin and other early warning signs reported prior to the disaster.

Immediately after the disaster, government and local authorities insisted on attributing the tragedy to an unexpected and unavoidable natural event. However, numerous warnings, signs of danger, and negative appraisals had been disregarded in the previous months and the eventual attempt to safely control the landslide into the lake by lowering its level came when the landslide was almost imminent and was too late to prevent it. The communist newspaper L'Unità was the first to denounce the actions of management and government. Leone accused the PCI of political profiteering from the tragedy, promising to bring justice to the people killed in the disaster. However, a few months after the end of his premiership, he became the head of SADE's team of lawyers, who significantly reduced the amount of compensation for the survivors and ruled out payment for at least 600 victims.

In December 1963, after only five months of government, when the congress of the PSI authorized a full engagement of the party into the government, Leone resigned and Aldo Moro, the secretary of the DC and leader of the more leftist wing of the party, became the new prime minister, ruling Italy for more than four years.

=== 1964 presidential election ===
In August 1964, President Antonio Segni suffered a serious cerebral hemorrhage while he was working at the presidential palace; he only partially recovered and decided to resign. Leone was selected as the DC's official candidate for the presidency, but Fanfani decided to run against him. However, neither Fanfani nor Leone succeeded in being elected, in fact, during the 1964 presidential election, the social-democratic leader Giuseppe Saragat succeeded in gaining the majority of votes.

In August 1967, Leone was appointed Senator for Life by President Saragat.

=== Second term ===
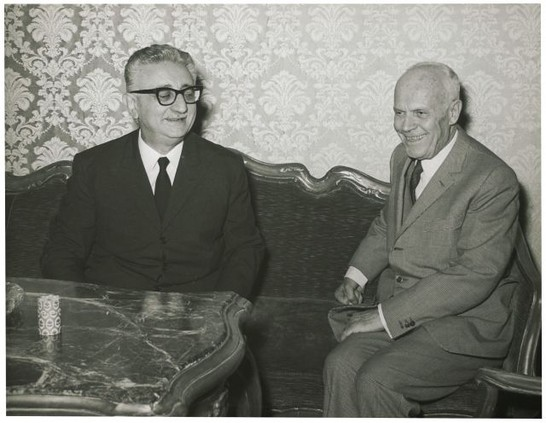
Giovanni Leone with the President of the Chamber of Deputies, Sandro Pertini, in 1968

In June 1968, after the general election, Saragat appointed Leone at the head of the government. As his first cabinet, also the second one was composed only by DC members and externally supported by PSU and PRI.

Leone's second premiership lasted only seven months. In December 1968, he resigned and Mariano Rumor became the new prime minister.

== President (1971–1978) ==
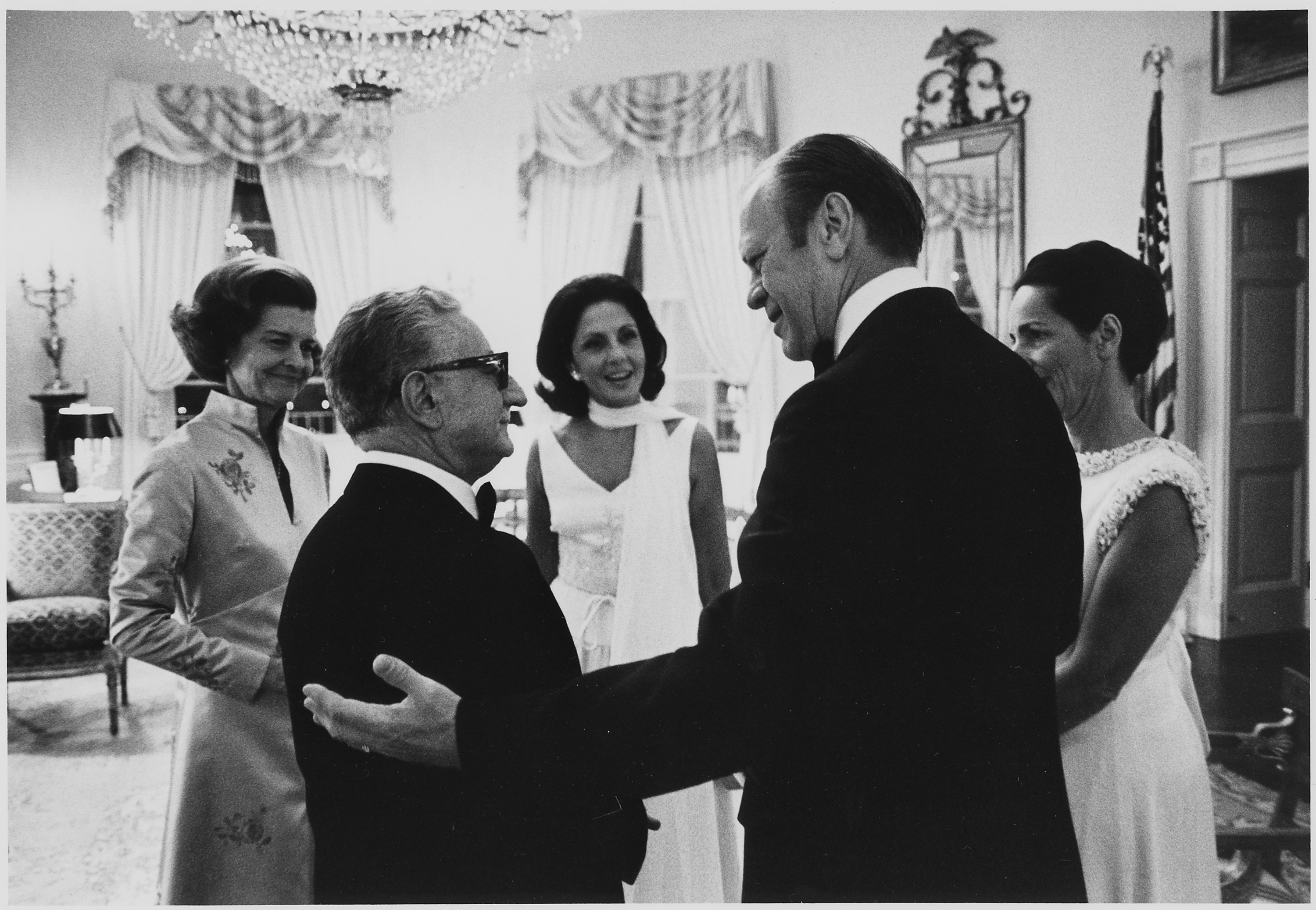
Giovanni Leone with U.S. President Gerald Ford, in 1974

In 1971, Amintore Fanfani was proposed as Christian Democracy's candidate for the Presidency of the Republic. However his candidacy was weakened by the divisions within his own party and the candidacy of the socialist Francesco De Martino, who received votes from PCI, PSI and some PSDI members. Fanfani retired after several unsuccessful ballots and, on the twenty-second round, Leone was selected as the Christian democratic candidate for the presidency, being slightly preferred to Aldo Moro. On the twenty third round he was finally elected with a centre-right majority, with 518 votes out of 996, including those of the neo-fascist Italian Social Movement (MSI). Leone's majority was the narrowest one ever obtained by an elected president and with twenty-three rounds of voting the 1971 presidential election remains the longest presidential election in Italy's republican history.

Leone's presidency was considered quite revolutionary for the role held by his wife, Vittoria. Before her, the wife of the Italian presidents had always been on the sidelines, not involved in Italian political life. However, Vittoria Leone completely changed the role and had been widely regarded as the most prominent first lady of the Italian Republic.

During his presidency, he had to face an extremely complex political and social situation. Already in the first months of the seven-year term, he had to approve the early dissolution of the Chambers, for the first time since the birth of the Republic. This decision was taken by Leone with the approval of most of the political parties, but it was accompanied by the choice to entrust the management of the electoral phase, not to the resigning coalition government of Emilio Colombo, but to a one-party government led by Giulio Andreotti. For this choice, Leone was heavily criticised by the opposition. With a total of 152 votes in favor and 158 against, the government did not gain the confidence of the Senate and was forced to resign after only 9 days.

After Andreotti's resignation in July 1973, Leone gave to Mariano Rumor the task of forming a new centre-left cabinet, which however lasted only a year, when, in November, Aldo Moro became once again prime minister. During Moro's two-years rule, the DC tried to open a dialogue with the PCI of Enrico Berlinguer, in a political phase known as Historic Compromise, with the aim of bringing the communists into the government's majority. Leone, as a member of the party's right-wing, did not approve Moro's move, however he never openly opposed it.

=== Kidnapping of Aldo Moro ===
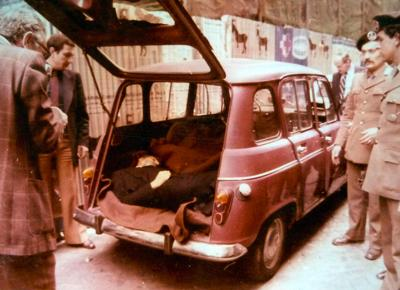
The corpse of Aldo Moro was found on 9 May 1978, in Rome

On the morning of 16 March 1978, the day on which the new Andreotti cabinet was supposed to have undergone a confidence vote in the Italian Parliament, the car of Aldo Moro, then-president of the Christian Democracy, was assaulted by a group of Red Brigades (BR) in Via Fani in Rome. Firing automatic weapons, the terrorists killed Moro's bodyguards (two Carabinieri in Moro's car and three policemen in the following car) and kidnapped him.

During the kidnapping, Leone was in favour of a negotiation with the terrorists, while Prime Minister Andreotti strongly opposed it: the BR proposed an exchange of prisoners to the Italian government, which was supported by Leone, but Andreotti refused. During his imprisonment, Moro wrote a statement expressing very harsh judgements against Andreotti. On 9 May 1978, Moro's body was found in the trunk of a Renault 4 in Via Caetani, after 55 days of imprisonment, during which Moro was submitted to a political trial by the so-called "people's court" set up by the Red Brigades.

=== Lockheed scandal and resignation ===
Leone's political career came to an end in 1978 due to the Lockheed bribery scandal. The allegations came from the United States and were supported by the Italian political magazine L'Espresso. According to the allegations, Lockheed bribed many high-profile politicians in Italy to purchase Hercules Aircraft for the military. Leone and his family were allegedly implicated in the bribery.

In June 1978, after months of polemics, Leone resigned as President of the Republic. However, the accusations were never proved and his most prominent accuser was convicted of libel three times.

== Death and legacy ==
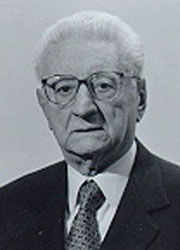
Leone in 1996

After his resignation, Leone continued sitting in the Italian Parliament as a senator for life. Moreover, through writings and interviews, as well as judgments, he also had the opportunity to reaffirm and stress the correctness of his acts as president of the Italian Republic and the unreliability of the accusations moved against him and his family. In addition, several of the politicians who had attacked him most during the presidency, also had the opportunity of apologizing to him. Among these, the radical leaders Marco Pannella and Emma Bonino, who on the occasion of Leone's 90th birthday, openly expressed their regrets.

On 25 September 2001, just a few weeks before his 93rd birthday, a decree by the Prime Minister awarded Leone of the title of President Emeritus of the Republic, which would be applied to all the future former presidents. Leone died in Rome on 9 November 2001 at his villa on the Via Cassia. On 25 November 2006, President Giorgio Napolitano stated that the Senate had granted full recognition of the correctness of Leone's actions, completely rehabilitating his political actions.

Leone was portrayed as a key antagonist in the 2020 film Rose Island, which tells the story of the Republic of Rose Island and the government's attempts to destroy it. Leone was played in the film by Luca Zingaretti.

== Electoral history ==
Election	House	Constituency	Party	Votes	Result
1946	Constituent Assembly	Naples–Caserta	DC	31,962	Elected
1948	Chamber of Deputies	Naples–Caserta	DC	60,007	Elected
1953	Chamber of Deputies	Naples–Caserta	DC	66,165	Elected
1958	Chamber of Deputies	Naples–Caserta	DC	206,182	Elected
1963	Chamber of Deputies	Naples–Caserta	DC	160,498	Elected

=== Presidential elections ===
1971 presidential election (23rd ballot)
Candidate	Party	Votes	%
Giovanni Leone	Christian Democracy	518	51.4
Pietro Nenni	Italian Socialist Party	408	40.5
Others / Invalid votes		82	8.1
Total		1,008	100.0

Political offices
Preceded by Giovanni Gronchi	President of the Chamber of Deputies; 1955–1963	Succeeded by Brunetto Bucciarelli-Ducci
Preceded by Amintore Fanfani	Prime Minister of Italy; 1963	Succeeded by Aldo Moro
Preceded by Aldo Moro	Prime Minister of Italy; 1968	Succeeded by Mariano Rumor
Preceded by Giuseppe Saragat	President of Italy; 1971–1978	Succeeded by Sandro Pertini
