= Giovanni Gronchi =

President of Italy from 1955 to 1962

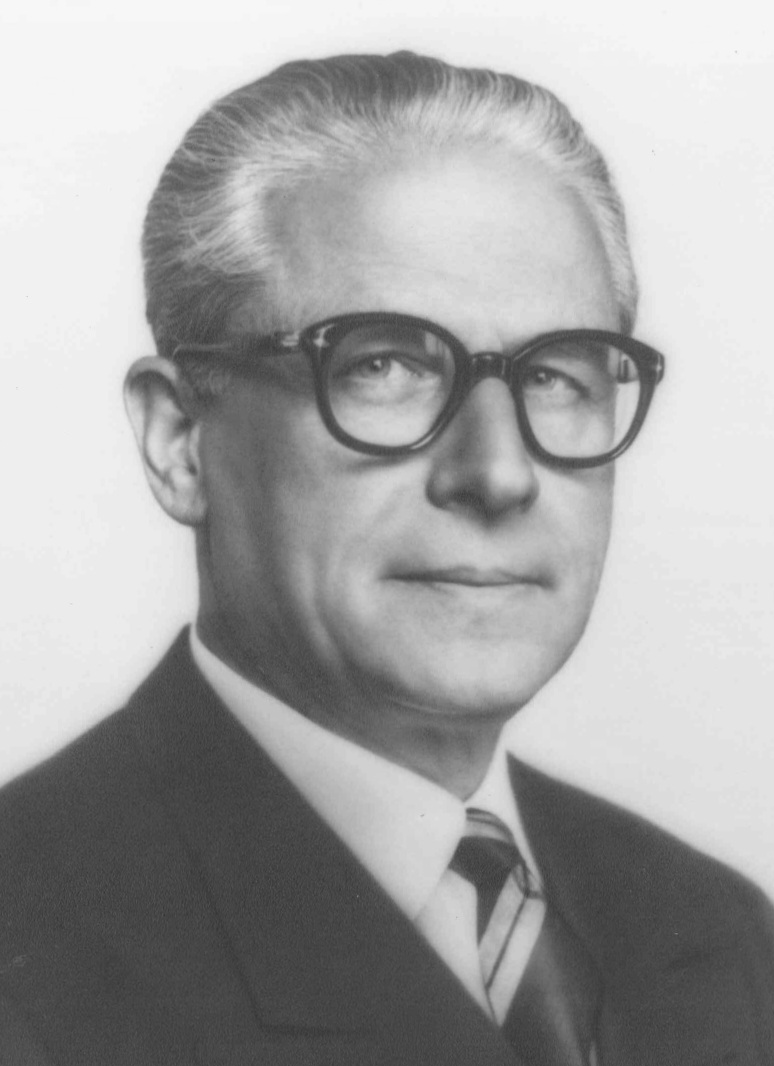
- Official portrait, c. 1955

President of Italy
- In office 11 May 1955 – 11 May 1962
- Prime Minister: Mario Scelba; Antonio Segni; Adone Zoli; Amintore Fanfani; Fernando Tambroni
- Preceded by: Luigi Einaudi
- Succeeded by: Antonio Segni

President of the Chamber of Deputies
- In office 8 May 1948 – 29 April 1955
- Preceded by: Umberto Terracini
- Succeeded by: Giovanni Leone

Minister of Industry and Trade
- In office 18 June 1944 – 1 July 1946
- Prime Minister: Ivanoe Bonomi; Ferruccio Parri; Alcide de Gasperi
- Preceded by: Attilio Di Napoli
- Succeeded by: Rodolfo Morandi

Member of the Senate of the Republic
- Ex officio
- Life tenure 11 May 1962 – 17 October 1978

Member of the Chamber of Deputies
- In office 8 May 1948 – 11 May 1955
- Constituency: Pisa
- In office 1 December 1919 – 21 January 1929
- Constituency: Pisa

Member of the Constituent Assembly
- In office 25 June 1946 – 31 January 1948
- Constituency: Pisa

Personal details
- Born: 10 September 1887 Pontedera, Tuscany, Kingdom of Italy
- Died: 17 October 1978 (aged 91) Rome, Lazio, Italy
- Party: Italian People's Party (1919–1926); Christian Democracy (1943–1978)
- Spouse: Carla Bissatini (m. 1941)
- Education: Scuola Normale Superiore di Pisa
- Profession: Teacher

Giovanni Gronchi (Italian: [dʒoˈvanni ˈɡroŋki]; 10 September 1887 – 17 October 1978) was an Italian politician from Christian Democracy who served as the president of Italy from 1955 to 1962 and was marked by a controversial and failed attempt to bring about an "opening to the left" in Italian politics. He was reputed the real holder of the executive power in Italy from 1955 to 1962, behind the various Prime Ministers of this time. During his term he saw the fall of the Italian Empire in 1960, with the independence of the Somali Republic.

== Biography ==
=== Early life and political career ===
He was born in Pontedera, Tuscany, and was an early member of the Christian Movement founded by the Catholic priest don Romolo Murri in 1902. He obtained his first degree in literature and philosophy at the Scuola Normale Superiore di Pisa. Between 1911 and 1915 he then worked as a high-school teacher of classics in several Italian towns (Parma, Massa di Carrara, Bergamo and Monza).

He volunteered for military service in the First World War and when it was over he became in 1919 one of the founding members of the Catholic Italian Popular Party. He was elected to represent Pisa in both the parliamentary elections of 1919 and 1921. A trade union leader in the Italian Confederation of Christian Workers, in 1922–1923 he served in the first government of Benito Mussolini as Under-secretary for Industry and Commerce. In April 1923, however, a national meeting of the Popular Party held in Turin decided to withdraw all PPI representatives from the government. He then went back to his role in the leadership of the Catholic trade unions, and tried to face the daily violence brought against them by the fascist squads.

In 1924, after Luigi Sturzo had resigned as Secretary of the PPI, Gronchi became leader of the party, together with two other "triumvirs", (Spataro and Rodinò). Re-elected to Parliament in the same year, he joined the anti-fascist opposition of the so-called Aventine Secession (from the hill in Rome where the opposition withdrew from Parliament). In 1926 he was expelled from Parliament by the new regime.

In the years between 1925 and 1943, he thus interrupted his political career. In order to avoid having to become a member of the Fascist Party, he also resigned his position as a schoolteacher, and earned his living as a successful businessman, first as a salesman and then as an industrialist.

=== After the Second World War ===
In 1943–1944 he was a co-founder of the new Christian-Democratic party (DC), and became a leader of its left-wing faction, together with men like Giorgio La Pira, Giuseppe Dossetti and Enrico Mattei (the future boss of ENI, the Italian government-owned petrochemical giant). He was also a member of the Comitato di Liberazione Nazionale, the multi-party committee of the Italian Resistance, as a representative of his party.

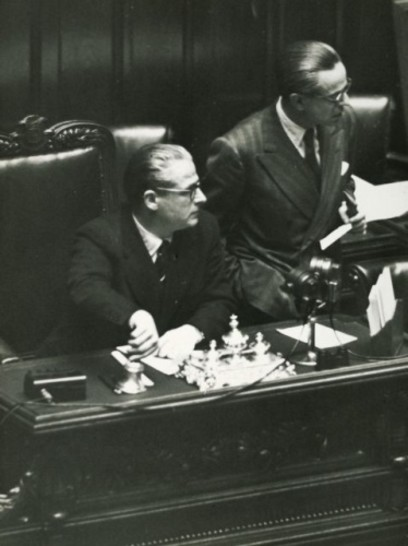
Gronchi with the Vice-President of the Italian Chamber of Deputies, Gaetano Martino, in 1948

Although often in conflict with his party's majority and its Secretary Alcide De Gasperi, he served as Industry minister in 1944–1946 and as a member of the Constituent Assembly in 1946. In 1947, as the Cold War began, he vehemently opposed his party's decision to expel the Italian Communist and Socialist parties from the national government. From 1948 to 1955 he was elected President of the Italian Chamber of Deputies (the lower branch of Parliament).

== President (1955–1962) ==
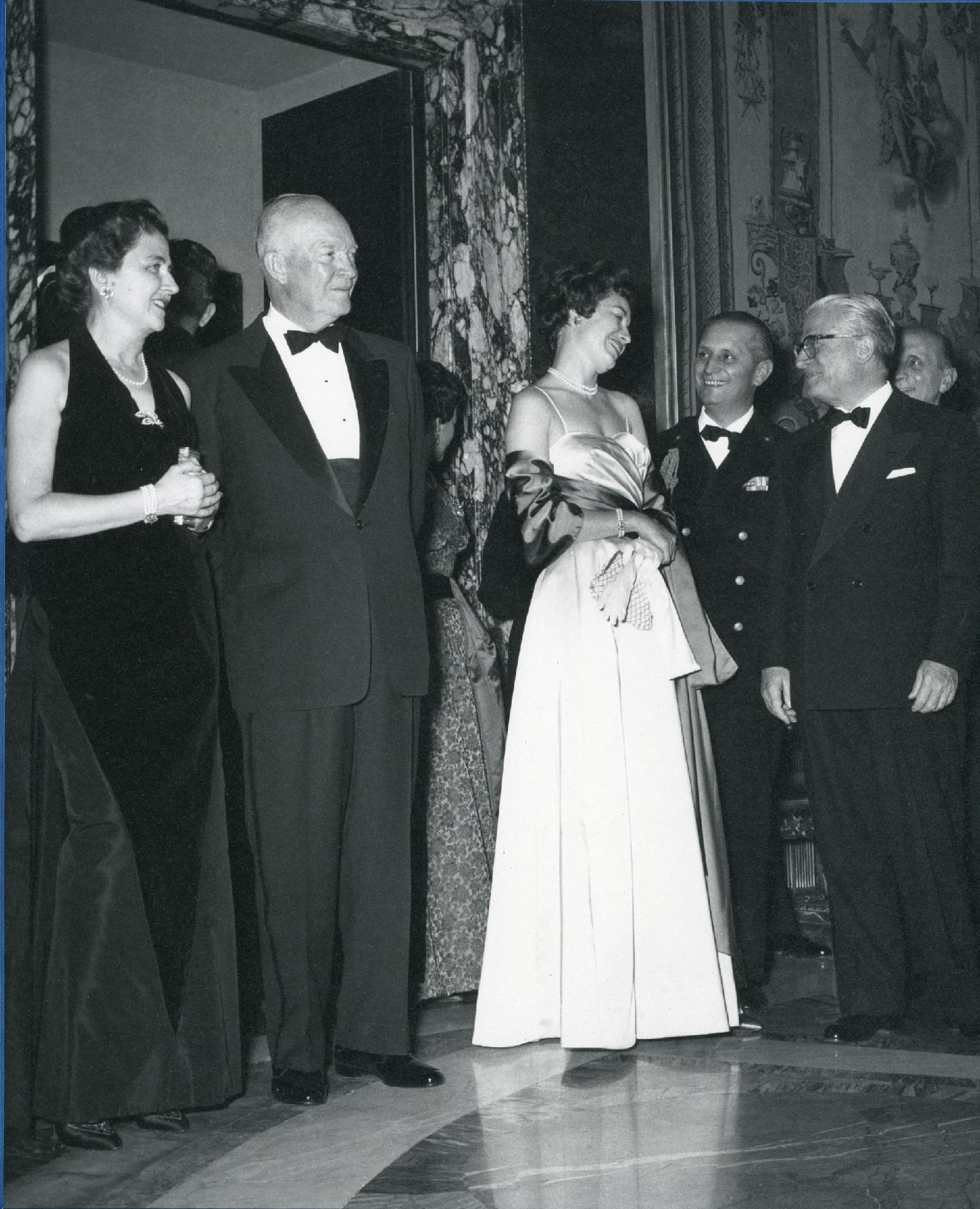
President Giovanni Gronchi (right) during a visit of US President Dwight Eisenhower in 1959; Gronchi's wife Carla Bissatini stands on the far left.

In 1955 Luigi Einaudi's term as first President of the Italian Republic came to an end, and Parliament had to choose his successor. The new Secretary of the DC, Amintore Fanfani, was promoting the liberal Cesare Merzagora for the job, who was then president of the Senate. However, the right-wing of the party – led by Giuseppe Pella, Guido Gonella, Salvatore Scoca and Giulio Andreotti – joined hands with the trade-unionist left – led by Giovanni Pastore, Giorgio Bo and Achille Marazza – in an "uprising" against the party leadership, in order to get Gronchi ("Parliament's man") elected instead. The move had the support of the Communist and Socialist parties, and also of the monarchic and neo-fascist right. After a bitter battle and the final crumbling of the centrist front, on 29 April 1955 Gronchi was elected President of the Republic with 658 votes out of 883. He was the first Catholic politician to become Head of the Italian State.

His period in office lasted until 1962. It was marked by the ambition to bring about a gradual "opening to the left", whereby the Socialists and the Communist Party would be brought back into the national government, and Italy would abandon NATO, becoming a non-aligned country. There was however stiff parliamentary opposition to this project, particularly by the small Italian Liberal Party, which was deemed a necessary ingredient of any viable majority.

In an attempt to escape the deadlock, in 1959 Gronchi appointed as prime minister a trusted member of his own Catholic left-wing faction, Fernando Tambroni, sending him to Parliament with a "President’s government" but no pre-arranged majority. However, Tambroni found himself surviving in Parliament only thanks to neo-fascist votes. This unforeseen "opening to the right" had serious consequences. In 1960 there were bad riots in several towns in Italy, particularly at Genoa, Licata and Reggio Emilia, where the police opened fire on demonstrators, killing five people. The Tambroni government thus ended in ignominy; forced to resign, it was followed by an all-DC government, with a traditionally centrist parliamentary majority.

The unhappy Tambroni experiment tarnished Gronchi's reputation for good, and until the end of his period of office, he remained a lame-duck President. In 1962 he attempted to get a second mandate, with the powerful help of Enrico Mattei, but the attempt failed and Antonio Segni was elected instead. As he ceased to be Head of State, he became a life senator by right, according to the Italian Constitution. He died in Rome on 17 October 1978 at the age of 91.

During Gronchi’s presidency, Italy also witnessed the formal end of its colonial era. In 1960, the former Italian Somaliland, which had been under United Nations trusteeship since 1950, gained independence as part of the new Somali Republic, marking the definitive end of the Italian Empire.

=== Assessment ===
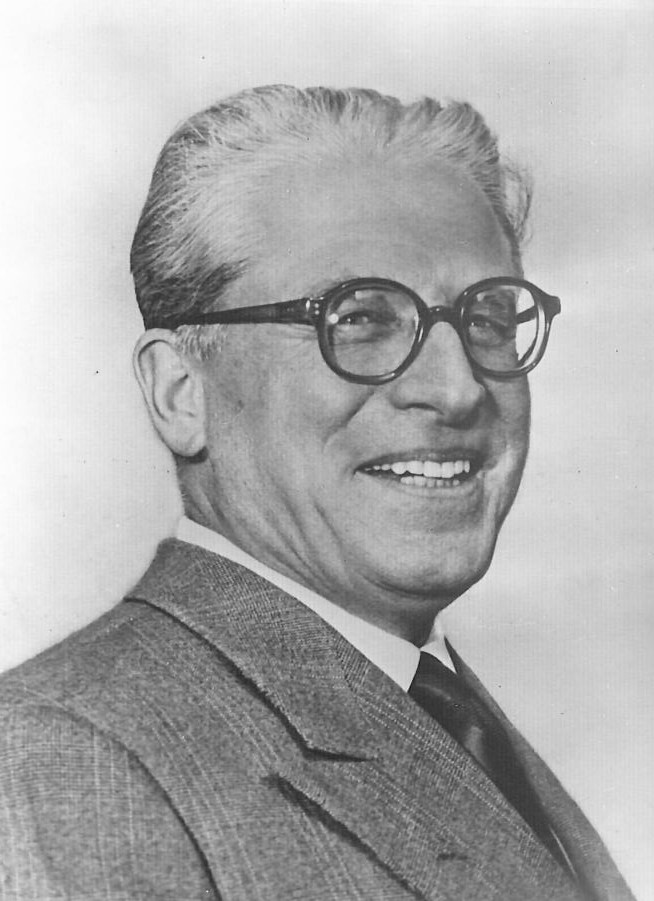
Later portrait of Gronchi

For an overall historical assessment of his presidency, the Tambroni failure must be kept in mind, suggesting an authoritarian approach. An "opening to the left" of sorts happened soon after his mandate was over; the first centre-left coalition was formed by Aldo Moro as soon as 1964, when the Socialists (but not the Communists) entered the government. In the 1970s, the Christian Democrats and Communists made efforts toward what was called the Historic Compromise. On this basis, he might be credited with some important foresight and a lasting influence. Still, it is hard to maintain that his political project had really much to do with the centre-left governments that followed each other between 1964 and 1992. During most of this period, the Communists were isolated even more tightly than before, due to the loss of their former Socialist allies and the bitter conflict that followed them, particularly after Bettino Craxi became the Socialist leader. Outside influences were later revealed to be at work as well. A 2000 Parliament Commission report concluded that the strategy and operations by the clandestine, US-supported, "stay-behind" Gladio was designed to "stop the PCI, and to a certain degree also the PSI [Italian Socialist Party], from achieving executive power in the country". In any case, Italy kept its socio-economic structure as a market economy and its foreign policy alignment.

== Personal life ==
In 1941, Gronchi married Carla Bissatini (2 September 1912 – 14 August 1993) and had one son and one daughter.

In the Florestano Vancini's film The Assassination of Matteotti (1973), Gronchi is played by Giorgio Favretto.

== Electoral history ==
Election	House	Constituency	Party	Votes	Result
1919	Chamber of Deputies	Pisa	PPI	—N/a	Elected
1921	Chamber of Deputies	Pisa	PPI	—N/a	Elected
1924	Chamber of Deputies	Pisa	PPI	—N/a	Elected
1946	Constituent Assembly	Pisa–Livorno–Lucca–Massa Carrara	DC	47,424	Elected
1948	Chamber of Deputies	Pisa–Livorno–Lucca–Massa Carrara	DC	68,808	Elected
1953	Chamber of Deputies	Pisa–Livorno–Lucca–Massa Carrara	DC	62,099	Elected

=== Presidential elections ===
1955 presidential election (4th ballot)
Candidate	Supported by	Votes	%
Giovanni Gronchi	DC, PSI, PCI, PSDI, PRI, MSI	658	78.1
Luigi Einaudi	PLI	70	8.4
Others / Invalid votes		103	13.5
Total		833	100.0

== See also ==
- Gronchi Rosa

Political offices
Preceded by Attilio Di Napoli	Minister of Agriculture, Industry and Trade; 1944-1946	Succeeded by Rodolfo Morandi
Preceded by Umberto Terracini	President of the Chamber of Deputies; 1948-1955	Succeeded by Giovanni Leone
Preceded by Luigi Einaudi	President of Italy; 1955–1962	Succeeded by Antonio Segni
