= Paolo Rossi (politician) =

Italian politician (1900–1985)

Paolo Rossi Knight Grand Cross of Order of Merit of the Italian Republic
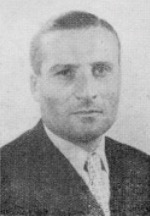
- Honourable Paolo Rossi

President of the Constitutional Court of Italy
- In office 18 December 1975 – 9 May 1978
- Preceded by: Francesco Paolo Bonifacio
- Succeeded by: Leonetto Amadei

Minister of Public Education
- In office 6 July 1955 – 6 May 1957
- Prime Minister: Antonio Segni
- Preceded by: Giuseppe Ermini
- Succeeded by: Aldo Moro

President of Antimafia Commission
- In office 14 February 1963 – 15 May 1963
- Prime Minister: Amintore Fanfani
- Preceded by: First
- Succeeded by: Donato Pafundi

Vice-president of Chamber of Deputies (Italy)
- In office 1958–1963

Personal details
- Born: 15 September 1900 Bordighera, Italy
- Died: 24 May 1985 (aged 84) Lucca, Italy
- Party: Italian Democratic Socialist Party
- Spouse: Giuseppina Bagnara
- Children: Maria Francesca Rossi, called Francesca Duranti
- Education: University of Genoa
- Profession: Lawyer, professor, politician

Paolo Rossi (Bordighera, 15 September 1900 – Lucca, 24 May 1985) was an Italian lawyer and politician.

== Biography ==
Paolo Rossi was the son of the famous criminal lawyer of Genoa, Francesco Rossi, and of Iride Garrone. He came from an educated and progressive Ligurian family; his cousin was Maria Vittoria Rossi, better known as Irene Brin, the fashion journalist and style icon.

The young man decided to follow his father's footsteps and graduated at the University of Genoa, he enrolled to the Bar of the Appellate court of Genoa at 21 and to Court of cassation at 28. Persecuted by the fascists, in 1926 his study of via Roma in Genoa was destroyed and burned.

In 1932 he wrote his first book "The death penalty and its criticism", which will be blocked by the censors because it opposed the death penalty supported by the fascist regime.

He married Giuseppina Bagnara, called Giugi, whom he met in Bordighera, and he has a daughter, the writer Maria Francesca Rossi, known with her pen name of Francesca Duranti. In 1937 he wrote his second book "Skepticism and dogmatic in criminal law", which was also criticized for its too progressive ideas. During the war, the family moved near Lucca, in Gattaiola. In those years he joins the resistance and, with his wife, he managed to save many young people from fascist raids.

In 1948 he published "The parties against democracy" and, shortly afterwards, was appointed Professor of Criminal Law at the University of Pisa. On 15 October 1947 he became a member of the Constituent and of the Committee on the Constitution of Italy. The same year he became Professor of Criminal Law at the University of Genoa.

A leading member of the Italian Democratic Socialist Party, he was elected as Member of Parliament in the first four legislatures, and took, in two of them, the vice-presidency of the Chamber of Deputies in addition to the presidency of some inquiry commissions. He was Minister of Education from 6 July 1955 to 19 May 1957 during the first Government of Antonio Segni. In 1958 he was appointed Vice-President of the Chamber of Deputies (Italy), and in 1961 President of the Commission on the problems of Alto-Adige.

He was the first president of the Antimafia Commission (in the third Legislature from 14 February to 15 May 1963) which was then called the Parliamentary Commission of Inquiry on the Mafia in Sicily.

On 2 May 1969 he was named Judge of the Constitutional Court of the Italian Republic by the President of the Italian Republic, Giuseppe Saragat, was sworn in on 9 May 1969 and was elected president of the Court on 18 December 1975. He ceased to hold office as President on 9 May 1978 but stayed on as judge until 2 August 1979).

He was the author of many texts, both in the legal and in the political field. From 1970 to 1973 he published a collection of four volumes on the history of Italy, entitled "History of Italy from 476 to the present day".

He was also president of the general National Corps of Italian Boy Scouts (CNGEI).

He died in Lucca on 24 May 1985 and was buried in the cemetery of Gattaiola.

== Honours ==
Cordone di gran Croce OMRI BAR

On 6 August 1970 he was named "Knight Grand Cross of Order of Merit of the Italian Republic” by the president of the Italian Republic, Giuseppe Saragat.

== Bibliography ==
- P. Rossi, La pena di morte e la sua critica, Genova, Bozzi Succ. Lattes, 1932.
- P. Rossi, Scetticismo e dogmatica nel diritto penale, Messina-Milano, 1937.
- P. Rossi, Lineamenti di diritto penale costituzionale, Palermo, Priulla, 1953.
- P. Rossi, I partiti contro la democrazia, 1945. ASIN : B0017VJ10M
- P. Rossi, Storia d'Italia dal 476 ai giorni nostri, Moderne Canesi 1970–1973. ASIN : B00LJ1FI6K
