= Ennio Zelioli-Lanzini =

Italian politician (1899–1976)

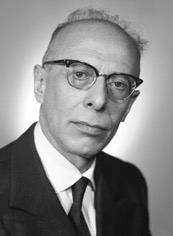
Ennio Zelioli-Lanzini

Ennio Zelioli Lanzini (8 February 1899 – 8 February 1976) was an Italian politician that become President of the Senate in 1967.

== Life and career ==
Born in San Giovanni in Croce, son of a schoolteacher, he participated in World War I as an officer of the Regio Esercito. In 1921, he graduated in law from Pavia and then began his political activities, but he was forced to stop his activities by the fascist regime. In 1943, he joined the partigiani and in 1948 he was elected into the Senate for the first time. In 1960, he was elected vice president of the Senate for the first time, and in 1964, he acted as president of the Senate because Cesare Merzagora was an interim president of the Republic.

In 1967, he was elected president of the Senate, but after new elections he was not reelected as president of the Senate. In 1968, he was, for a brief time, the Minister of Health. In 1972, Zilioli-Lanzini decided not to seek re-election. Zelioli-Lanzini died in 1976.

Political offices
Preceded by Cesare Merzagora	President of the Senate; 1967–1968	Succeeded by Amintore Fanfani
