= Brunetto Bucciarelli-Ducci =

Italian politician (1914–1994)

Brunetto Bucciarelli-Ducci OMRI
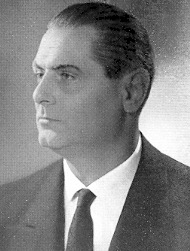

Judge of the Constitutional Court of Italy
- In office 31 January 1977 – 31 January 1986
- Appointed by: Italian Parliament

President of the Chamber of Deputies
- In office 26 June 1963 – 4 June 1968
- Preceded by: Giovanni Leone
- Succeeded by: Alessandro Pertini

Member of the Chamber of Deputies
- In office 8 May 1948 – 4 July 1976
- Constituency: Siena

Personal details
- Born: 18 June 1914 Terranuova Bracciolini, Tuscany, Italy
- Died: 4 February 1994 (aged 79) Arezzo, Tuscany, Italy
- Party: Christian Democracy
- Education: University of Florence
- Profession: Politician, magistrate

Brunetto Bucciarelli-Ducci (18 June 1914 – 4 February 1994) was an Italian politician and magistrate.

His name appears in the list of members of the P2 lodge found in Castiglion Fibocchi on 17 March 1981.

== Biography ==
Bucciarelli-Ducci was born in Terranuova Bracciolini, Province of Arezzo. He graduated in law at the University of Florence in 1937. Subsequently, he passed the competition for judicial auditor in 1940 and entered the judiciary.

During the Second World War he was called to arms as an artillery officer and subsequently served at the military tribunal of Bari, where he met Aldo Moro, then an airman assigned to the same tribunal, to whom he was always bound by a deep friendship. At the end of the war period he resumed his career as a magistrate as investigating judge at the Arezzo court.

In 1948 he was elected deputy in the Siena-Arezzo-Grosseto constituency and reconfirmed continuously until the 6th parliamentary term, among the ranks of the Christian Democracy. In 1953 he became vice-chairman of the Christian Democratic group in the Chamber, led by Attilio Piccioni. On 12 June 1958, he was elected vice-president of the Chamber of Deputies and was also confirmed in the subsequent parliamentary term. Following the appointment of President of Chamber Giovanni Leone as Prime Minister, in the session of 26 June 1963 Bucciarelli-Ducci was elected president of the assembly with a wide parliamentary consensus.

On 27 January 1977, he was elected judge of the Constitutional Court by Parliament in a joint session, together with Alberto Malagugini and Oronzo Reale. He held the position until 31 January 1986.

He died in Arezzo on 4 February 1994 of a myocardial infarction

== Electoral history ==
Election	House	Constituency	Party	Votes	Result
1948	Chamber of Deputies	Siena–Arezzo–Grosseto	DC	14,149	Elected
1953	Chamber of Deputies	Siena–Arezzo–Grosseto	DC	21,854	Elected
1958	Chamber of Deputies	Siena–Arezzo–Grosseto	DC	33,930	Elected
1963	Chamber of Deputies	Siena–Arezzo–Grosseto	DC	44,346	Elected
1968	Chamber of Deputies	Siena–Arezzo–Grosseto	DC	38,133	Elected
1972	Chamber of Deputies	Siena–Arezzo–Grosseto	DC	43,049	Elected

== Honours and awards ==
- Italy: Knight of the Grand Cross of the Order of Merit of the Italian Republic (5 July 1976)
