= Cesare Merzagora =

Italian politician from Milan (1898–1991)

Senator for Life Cesare Merzagora
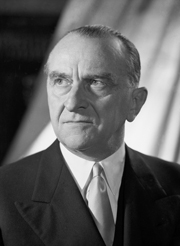

President of the Italian Senate
- In office 25 June 1953 – 7 November 1967
- Preceded by: Meuccio Ruini
- Succeeded by: Ennio Zelioli-Lanzini

Acting President of Italy
- In office 6 December 1964 – 29 December 1964
- Prime Minister: Aldo Moro
- Preceded by: Antonio Segni
- Succeeded by: Giuseppe Saragat

Minister of Foreign Trade
- In office 1 June 1947 – 1 April 1949
- Prime Minister: Alcide De Gasperi
- Preceded by: Ezio Vanoni
- Succeeded by: Giovanni Battista Bertone

Personal details
- Born: 9 November 1898 Milan, Kingdom of Italy
- Died: 1 May 1991 (aged 92) Rome, Italian Republic
- Party: Christian Democracy (1948–1963); Independent (1963–1972; 1976–1991); Italian Liberal Party (1972–1976)
- Occupation: Banker, manager, politician

Cesare Merzagora (Italian pronunciation: [ˈtʃeːzare merˈdzaːɡora, ˈtʃɛː-]; 9 November 1898 – 1 May 1991) was an Italian politician from Milan.

== Biography ==
Merzagora was born in Milan on 9 November 1898.

Between 1947 and 1949, Merzagora served as Italy's Minister of Foreign Trade. He was President of Banca Popolare di Milano from 1950 to 1952, President of the Italian Senate from 1953 to 1967, and was also temporarily acting head of state in the period between the resignation of Antonio Segni and the election of Giuseppe Saragat in 1964. Merzagora was named senator for life in March of 1963.

He ran as a candidate of the Italian Christian Democracy Party, and was affiliated with this party for most of his whole political career and then as an independent politician.

He died in Rome on 1 May 1991.

Political offices
Preceded by Ezio Vanoni	Minister of Foreign Trade; 1947–1949	Succeeded by Giovanni Battista Bertone
Preceded by Meuccio Ruini	President of the Italian Senate; 1953–1967	Succeeded by Ennio Zelioli-Lanzini
Preceded by Antonio Segni	President of Italy; Acting; 1964	Succeeded by Giuseppe Saragat
Business positions
Preceded by Mario Cunietti	Chairman of the Banca Popolare di Milano; 1950–1952	Succeeded by Giovanni Battista Colombo
