= Giuseppe Saragat =

President of Italy from 1964 to 1971

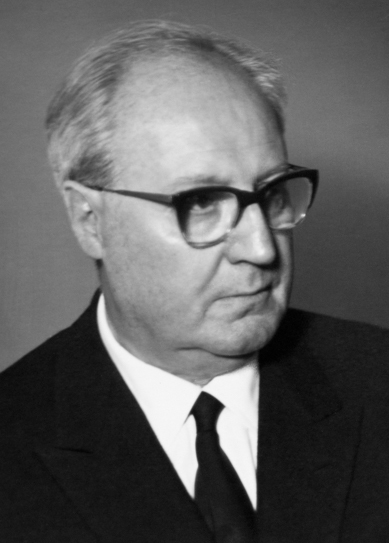
- Official portrait, 1971

President of Italy
- In office 29 December 1964 – 29 December 1971
- Prime Minister: Aldo Moro; Giovanni Leone; Mariano Rumor; Emilio Colombo
- Preceded by: Antonio Segni
- Succeeded by: Giovanni Leone

President of the Constituent Assembly
- In office 25 June 1946 – 6 February 1947
- Preceded by: Office established
- Succeeded by: Umberto Terracini
Ministerial offices
Minister of Foreign Affairs
In office 4 December 1963 – 22 July 1964
Prime Minister	Aldo Moro
Preceded by	Attilio Piccioni
Succeeded by	Aldo Moro
Deputy Prime Minister of Italy
In office 10 February 1954 – 19 May 1957
Prime Minister	Mario Scelba; Antonio Segni
Preceded by	Attilio Piccioni
Succeeded by	Giuseppe Pella
In office 1 June 1947 – 27 January 1950
Prime Minister	Alcide De Gasperi
Preceded by	Office established
Succeeded by	Attilio Piccioni
Parliamentary offices
Member of the Senate of the Republic
Ex officio
Life tenure 29 December 1971 – 11 June 1988
Member of the Chamber of Deputies
In office 8 May 1948 – 29 December 1964
Constituency	Turin–Novara–Vercelli
Member of the Constituent Assembly
In office 25 June 1946 – 31 January 1948
Constituency	Rome

Personal details
- Born: 19 September 1898 Turin, Piedmont, Kingdom of Italy
- Died: 11 June 1988 (aged 89) Rome, Lazio, Italy
- Resting place: Campo Verano, Rome
- Party: PSU (1922–1930); PSI (1930–1947); PSDI (1947–1988)
- Spouse: Giuseppina Bollani (m. 1926; died 1961)
- Children: 2
- Education: University of Turin

Giuseppe Saragat (Italian: [dʒuˈzɛppe ˈsaːraɡat]; 19 September 1898 – 11 June 1988) was an Italian politician and statesman who served as President of Italy from 1964 to 1971.

== Early and personal life ==
Saragat was born on 19 September 1898 in Turin, in the region of Piedmont, to Sardinian parents Giovanni Saragat (1855–1938), of Catalan descent, and Ernestina Stratta (1872–1965). He had an older brother, Eugenio "Ennio" (1897–1929), and a younger brother, Pietro (1899–1938). His grandfather's surname was originally Saragattu-Mulinas, but was later shortened.

Graduating in accountancy in 1915, Saragat took part in World War I as an artillery lieutenant of the Royal Italian Army on the Karst Plateau. After the war, he graduated in Economy and Commerce from the University of Turin in 1920, and became employed in banking.

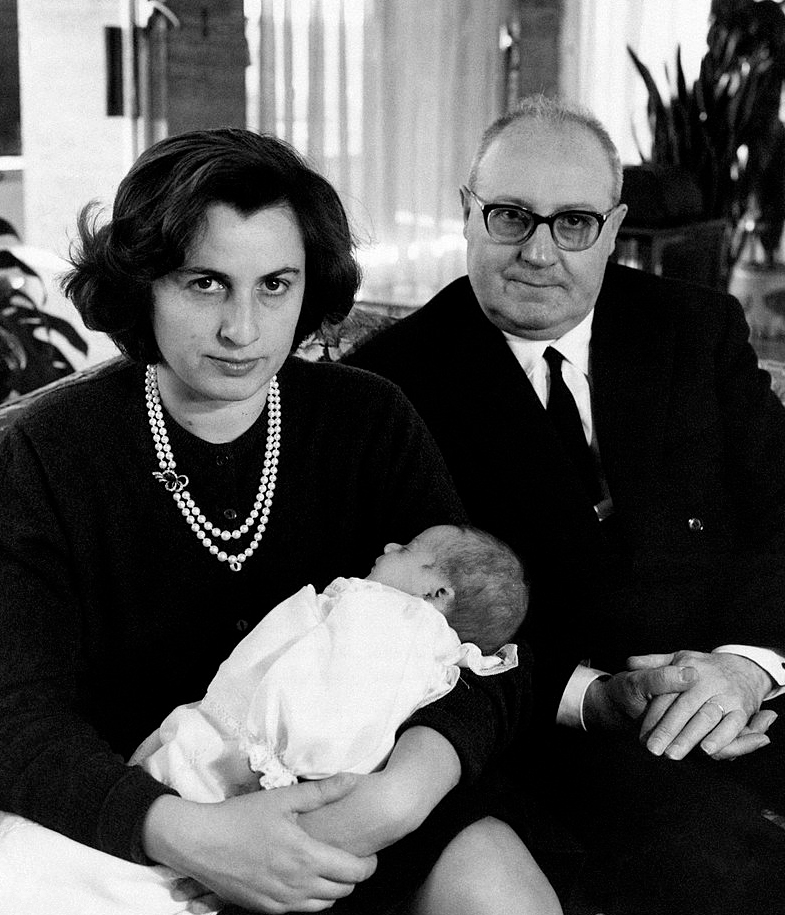
Saragat with his daughter Ernestina and her newborn son in 1963. Ernestina would assume the role of her father's official companion during his presidency as Saragat was widowered in 1961

In January 1926, Saragat married Milanese seamstress Giuseppina Bollani (1898–1961), with whom he had two children: Giovanni (1926–2007) and Ernestina "Tina" (b. 1928). Due to political persecution, he fled to Vienna in 1926 (joined by his wife in 1927) and then to France in 1929.

== Political career ==
In 1922, Saragat joined the Unitary Socialist Party (Partito Socialista Unitario; PSU) under the influence of Piero Gobetti, and began collaborating with Claudio Treves' journal La Giustizia. He was arrested twice in 1923 and 1924, and after Fascist Italy outlawed the Socialist Party in 1925, Saragat secretly co-founded the Socialist Party of Italian Workers (Partito Socialista dei Lavoratori Italiani; PSLI) alongside Treves and Carlo Rosselli.

Following the final dissolution of the PSU in 1930, Saragat joined the Italian Socialist Party (Partito Socialista Italiano, PSI). A reformist, he was a democratic socialist who left the PSI in 1947 out of concern over its then-close alliance with the Italian Communist Party. He subsequently refounded the PSLI, which in 1952 became the Italian Democratic Socialist Party (Partito Socialista Democratico Italiano; PSDI). He was to be the paramount leader of the PSDI for the rest of his life.

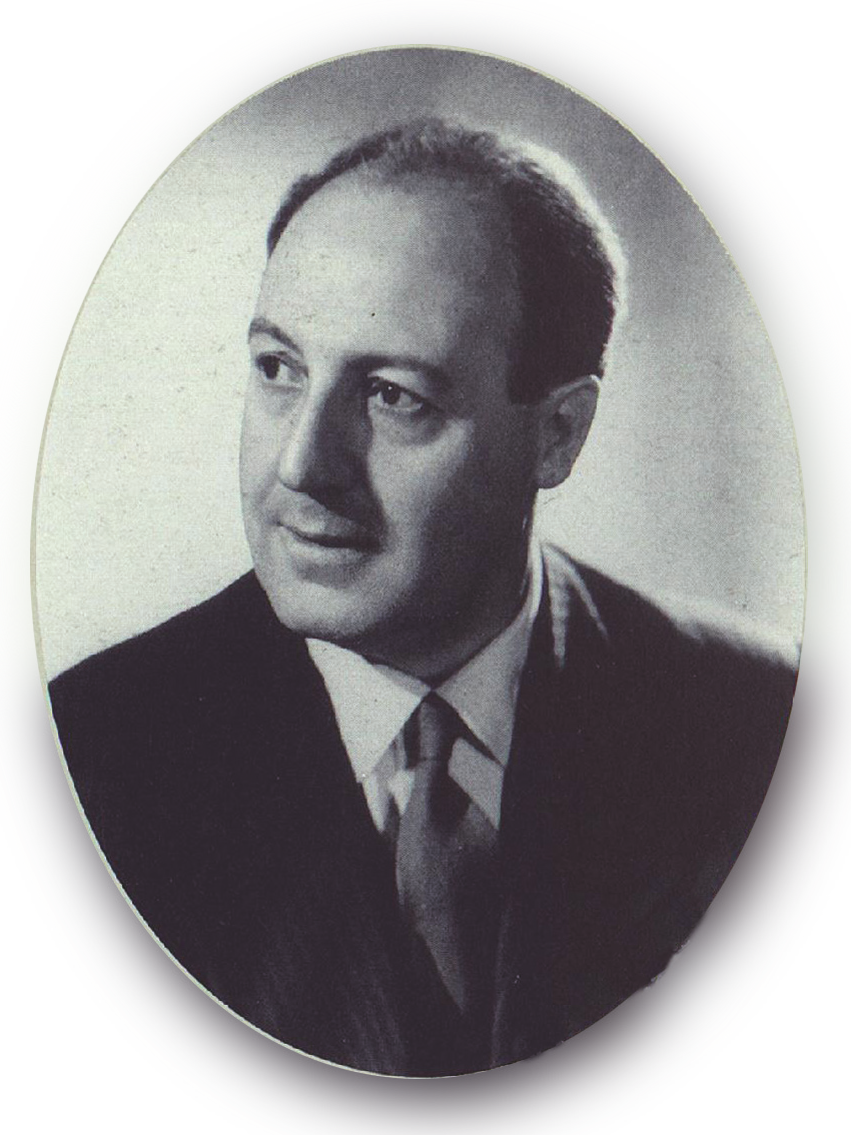
Saragat in the 1940s

In 1944, Saragat had been a minister without portfolio and ambassador in Paris from 1945 to 1946, before he was appointed president of the Constituent Assembly of Italy that same year upon the establishment of the Italian Republic. He was minister of foreign affairs in the Moro I Cabinet and Moro II Cabinet, headed by Christian Democracy leader Aldo Moro from 1963 to late 1964, when he was chosen as President of the Italian Republic. His election demonstrated a rare instance of unity among the Italian left and followed rumours of a possible neo-fascist coup, Piano Solo, during Antonio Segni's presidency.

Saragat died in Rome, Lazio, on 11 June 1988. An atheist, he is said to have become a Catholic in his later life, and had a religious funeral.

== Electoral history ==
Election	House	Constituency	Party	Votes	Result
1946	Constituent Assembly	Rome–Viterbo–Latina–Frosinone	PSIUP	29,981	Elected
1948	Chamber of Deputies	Turin–Novara–Vercelli	US	31,988	Elected
1953	Chamber of Deputies	Turin–Novara–Vercelli	PSDI	16,833	Elected
1958	Chamber of Deputies	Turin–Novara–Vercelli	PSDI	12,484	Elected
1963	Chamber of Deputies	Turin–Novara–Vercelli	PSDI	24,539	Elected

=== Presidential elections ===
1964 presidential election (21st ballot)
Candidate	Supported by	Votes	%
Giuseppe Saragat	PSDI, DC, PSI, PCI, PRI	646	67.1
Gaetano Martino	PLI	56	5.8
Augusto De Marsanich	MSI, PDIUM	40	4.1
Others / Invalid votes		185	19.2
Total		927	100.0

Political offices
Preceded by Carlo Sforza as President of the National Consult	President of the Constituent Assembly; 1946–1947	Succeeded by Umberto Terracini
Position established	Deputy Prime Minister of Italy; 1947–1950	Succeeded by Attilio Piccioni
Preceded by Attilio Piccioni	Deputy Prime Minister of Italy; 1954–1957	Succeeded by Giuseppe Pella
Preceded by Attilio Piccioni	Minister of Foreign Affairs; 1963–1964	Succeeded by Aldo Moro
Preceded by Antonio Segni	President of Italy; 1964–1971	Succeeded by Giovanni Leone
Party political offices
Position established	Secretary of the Italian Democratic Socialist Party; 1947–1948	Succeeded by Alberto Simonini
Preceded by Ludovico D'Aragona	Secretary of the Italian Democratic Socialist Party; 1949–1952	Succeeded by Ezio Vigorelli
Preceded by Giuseppe Romita	Secretary of the Italian Democratic Socialist Party; 1952–1954	Succeeded by Gianmatteo Matteotti
Preceded by Gianmatteo Matteotti	Secretary of the Italian Democratic Socialist Party; 1957–1964	Succeeded by Mario Tanassi
Preceded by Mario Tanassi	Secretary of the Italian Democratic Socialist Party; 1976	Succeeded by Pier Luigi Romita
