= Hans Klenk (businessman) =

German entrepreneur

Hans Klenk (born April 3, 1906, in Oßweil; died March 7, 1983, in Mainz) was a German entrepreneur, inventor, patron and benefactor. He was the founder of Hakle and an honorary citizen of the city of Ludwigsburg.

== Life ==
After attending high school and completing a banking apprenticeship, Klenk worked in the paper industry and other branches of industry. During the Second World War, he was commander of the anti-aircraft barracks on the present site of the University of Mainz.

Hans Klenk was married to Elly Thomas (1903-1994). Their son Hans-Dieter Klenk took over his father's company. Hans Klenk was buried in the Main Cemetery in Mainz.

== Company founder and entrepreneur ==
In 1928, Klenk founded the Hakle company, named after the first letters of his first and last name, in the former Provisions Office in his hometown of Ludwigsburg. Toilet paper was produced in the morning, with sales following in the afternoon.

Klenk was the first to offer a 1000-sheet roll of toilet paper and expanded his range to include other sanitary papers. He relocated his company in 1938 to Mainz and was considered the largest specialty paper manufacturer in the hygiene sector within the EEC in the 1960s.

A long-time employee from 1959 to 1983 was Herbert Bonewitz, who was responsible for the company's own magazine Die Rolle from 1960 onwards, and was ultimately an authorized signatory and head of corporate communications.

== Hakle ==
Hakle underwent numerous changes of ownership. It was acquired by Kimberly Clark in 1999, by Palero Capital on May 1, 2013 and by Cross Atlantic Capital in 2019.

== Philanthropy and public foundations ==
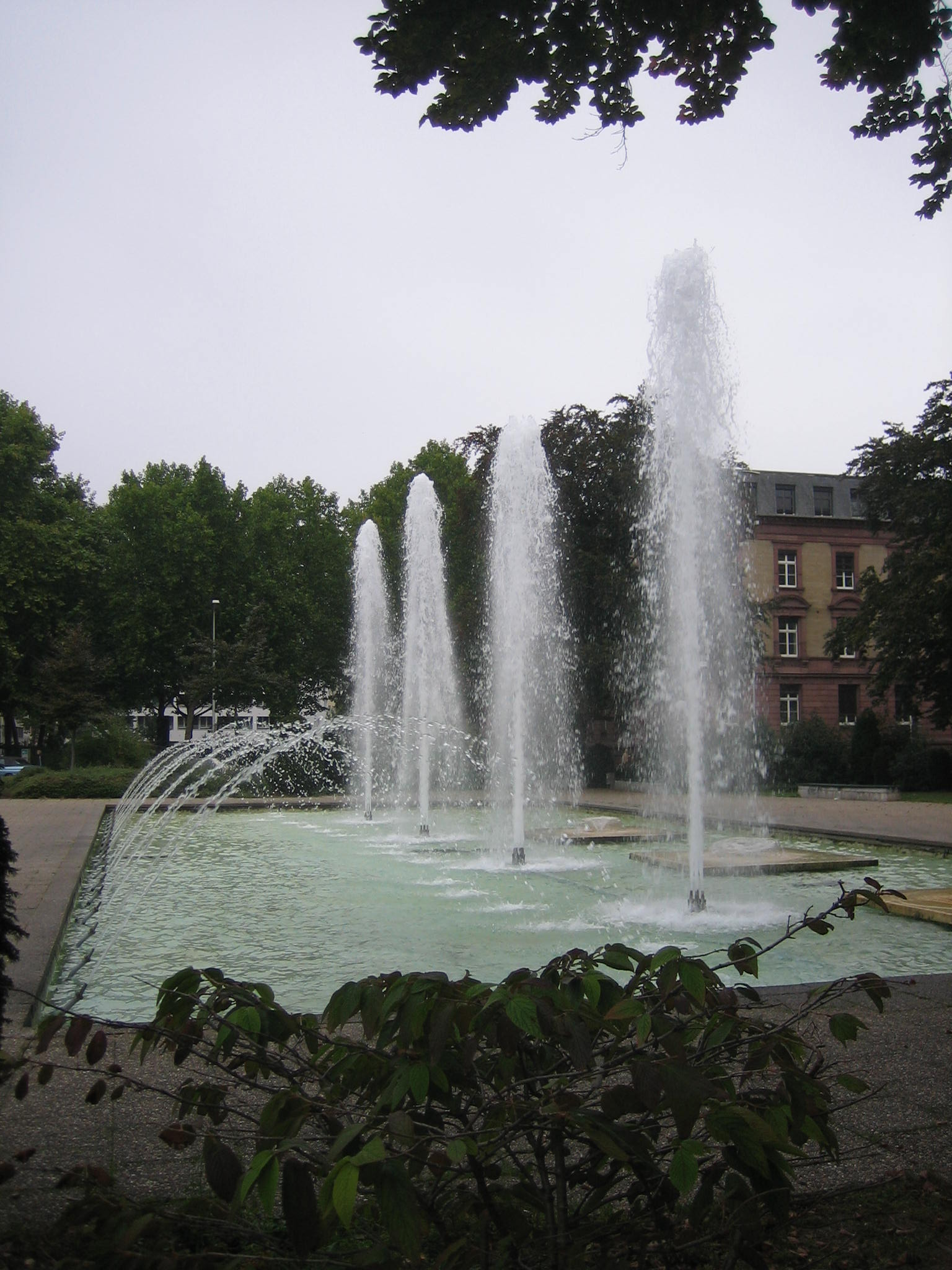
Hans-Klenk-Brunnen

- In 1952, he donated the redesign of the choir windows in the Christuskirche in Mainz, which had been badly damaged in 1945, by the glass designer Max Lüder, who came from Darmstadt..
- In 1962, he donated the Hans Klenk Fountain, designed by Rolf Ziffzer, on Kaiserstraße in front of the Christuskirche in Mainz.
- In 1963, Klenk donated the fountain that was erected in 1964 on the campus of Johannes Gutenberg University in Mainz, which is popularly known as the "Water Flush" and was modernized in 2005 with funds from his son Hans-Dieter Klenk.
- In 1967, he donated the war memorial on Breite Straße in Gonsenheim, designed and executed by the architect and sculptor Adalbert Ditt.
- In 1975, together with other people, he donated the "citizens' column" on Kirchstraße in Gonsenheim, which was created according to a design by Erwin Scheerer.

== Hans-Klenk-Stiftung ==
On June 3, 1966, the Hans Klenk Foundation was established to provide funds for the promotion of scientific work and to provide financial support for the Hans Klenk Prize. It was dissolved in 2017.

=== Laureate Hans Klenk Prize of the University of Mainz ===
- 1973: Martin Röllinghoff, Mikrobiologe
- 1975 und 1988: Joachim Otto Borneff, Bakteriologe

== Honors ==
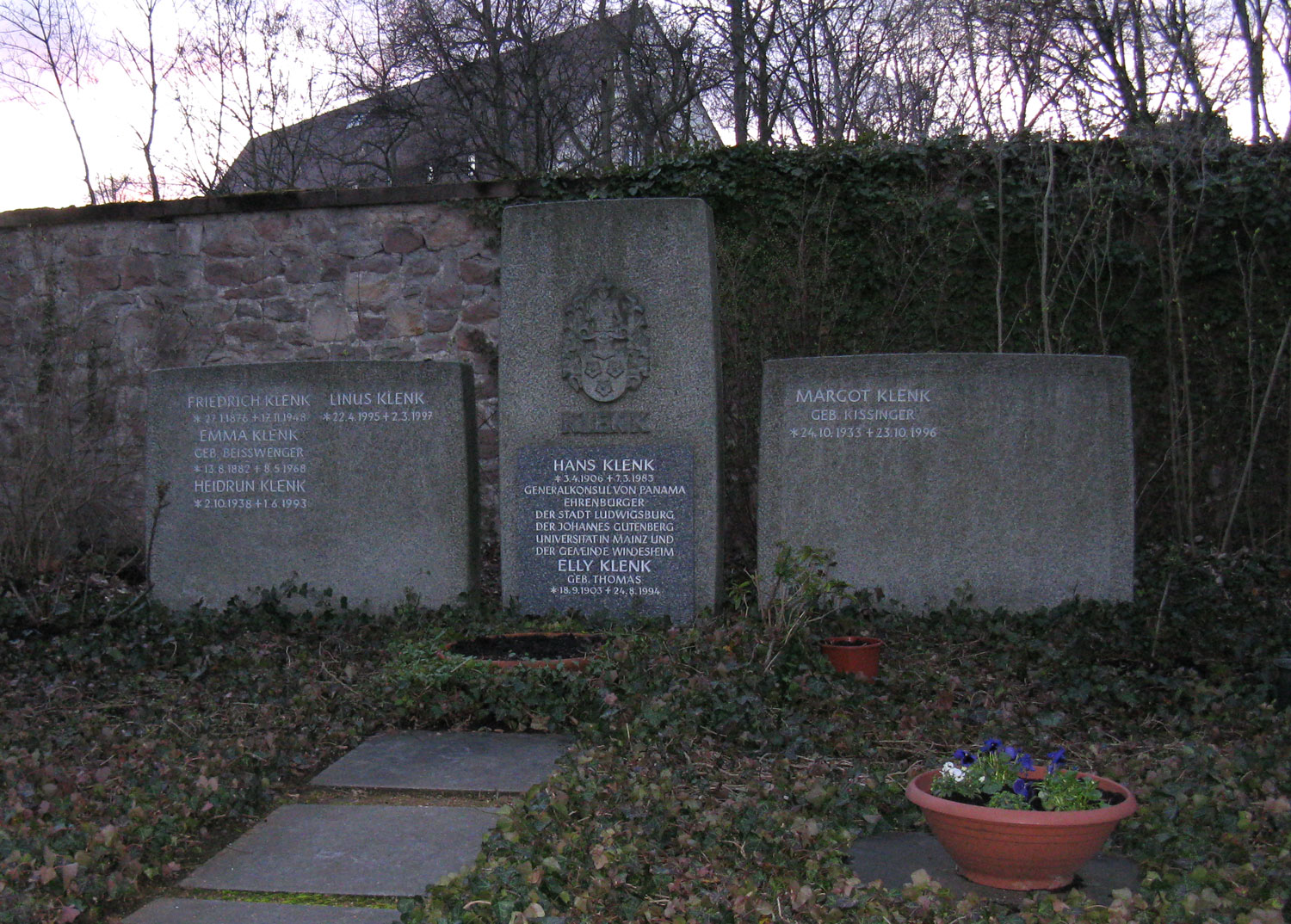
Tomb of Hans Klenk

- In 1964, Hans Klenk was made a Knight of the Order of Merit of the Italian Republic by the Italian President Antonio Segni for his exemplary support of guest workers.
- On April 3, 1966, he was awarded the Grand Cross of Merit of the Federal Republic of Germany by the Prime Minister of Rhineland-Palatinate, Peter Altmeier.
- In 1976, Klenk was made an honorary citizen of the city of Ludwigsburg.
- Hans-Klenk-Strasse in Mainz is named after him.

== Literature ==
- Huber, Wilhelm (2002). Das Mainz-Lexikon : 3600 Stichworte zu Stadt, Geschichte, Kultur, Persönlichkeiten. Mainz: H. Schmidt. ISBN 3-87439-600-2. OCLC 52645581.
- Die Gonsenheimer Jahrbücher. Die Gonsenheimer Jahrbücher des HGG, 2005, retrieved 23 August 2014
- Werke alter Meister aus Privatbesitz.: Sammlung Hans Klenk Mainz: Nachtrag
- Kritische Anmerkungen, Ergänzungen und Korrekturen. Gesellschaft für Bildende Kunst in Mainz, 1969, 32 Seiten
