= Franco Carraro =

Italian sports manager and politician (born 1939)

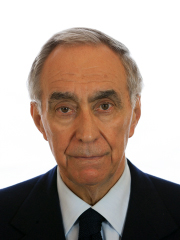
- Carraro in 2013

Member of the Senate of the Republic
- In office 15 March 2013 – 22 March 2018
- Constituency: Emilia-Romagna

Mayor of Rome
- In office 19 December 1989 – 19 April 1993
- Preceded by: Pietro Giubilo
- Succeeded by: Francesco Rutelli

Minister of Tourism and Entertainment
- In office 28 July 1987 – 6 February 1990
- Preceded by: Mario Di Lazzaro
- Succeeded by: Carlo Tognoli

President of CONI
- In office 8 March 1978 – 7 February 1987
- Preceded by: Giulio Onesti
- Succeeded by: Arrigo Gattai

President of FIGC
- In office 28 December 2001 – 8 May 2006
- Preceded by: Gianni Petrucci
- Succeeded by: Guido Rossi (as extraordinary commissioner of FIGC)
- In office 9 July 1986 – 29 July 1987
- Preceded by: Federico Sordillo
- Succeeded by: Andrea Manzella (as extraordinary vice-commissioner of FIGC)
- In office 14 April 1976 – 4 August 1978
- Preceded by: Artemio Franchi
- Succeeded by: Artemio Franchi

Personal details
- Born: 6 December 1939 (age 86) Padua, Italy
- Party: Forza Italia (since 2013)
- Other political affiliations: PSI (1980s–1994); PdL (2009–2013)
- Profession: Sports manager, politician

Franco Carraro (born 6 December 1939) is an Italian sports manager and politician with a career spanning over five decades. During his career, Carraro came to hold a series of positions and roles within sports and finance industries, and in both private and public sectors. For decades, he was also a member of the International Olympic Committee (IOC) and remains an honorary member after the approval of an age limit in 2019.

From 1966 and 1971, Carraro was associated with the Italian association football club Milan during a successful spell for the club. He began working for the Italian Football Federation (FIGC) and the Italian National Olympic Committee (CONI) during the 1970s, serving three terms as FIGC president between 1976 and 2006 when he resigned due to the 2006 Italian football scandal, and three terms as CONI president from 1978 to 1987. During the 1990s, he was also president of the National Professionals League (LNP), better known as Lega Calcio (equivalent of The Football Association in England), the governing body of Serie A and Serie B.

Carraro's political career began in the 1980s when he joined the Italian Socialist Party (PSI). From 1987 to 1990, he was Minister of Tourism and Entertainment. In 1989, he was elected mayor of Rome by the City Council of Rome, serving until 1993 with the establishment of the direct election of mayors. In the 2000s and 2010s, Carraro was associated with the political parties of Silvio Berlusconi. From 2013 to 2018, he was a member of the Senate of the Republic. Despite his later association with centre-right politics, Carraro continued to define himself as a socialist, dating back to his youth.

Carraro's legacy is complex as he left a significant mark on sports and achieved many successes and much influence through the FIGC, CONI, and IOC, presiding over the rise and fall of Italian football. On the other hand, his career was marred by a series of scandals and controversies, although most of the time he was not affected by them. His numerous roles earned him a series of nicknames and the identification with the status quo and the establishment.

== Early life ==
=== Family and education ===
Carraro was born in Padua, in the Italian region of Veneto, at the time Kingdom of Italy during the Fascist Italy era, on 6 December 1939. His father, Luigi Carraro, was the owner of a wholesale distribution company for fabrics and clothing and was president of Milan in 1966, and Carraro himself later discontinued his family businesses. His father often took him to watch the matches of the Milan-based Inter Milan and Milan football clubs. Carraro obtained a degree (laurea) in Economics and Commerce.

=== Sports champion ===
In his youth, Carraro participated in student competitions in foil and skiing, and successfully practiced water skiing, winning eleven individual Italian titles, three individual European titles, and three team titles. During his career, Carraro practiced a series of sports, including fencing (using foil), skiing, waterskiing, tennis, golf, and sailing. In the 1950s, Carraro was a champion of water skiing. He was the Italian junior champion (1953–1954), Italian Open champion (1955–1960), European champion in slalom and combined (1956 and 1961), European team champion (1958–1960), and bronze medalist at the World Championships (1957). At the age of 23, he was president of the Italian Waterski Federation (FISN).

== Career ==
=== From the 1960s to the 1970s ===
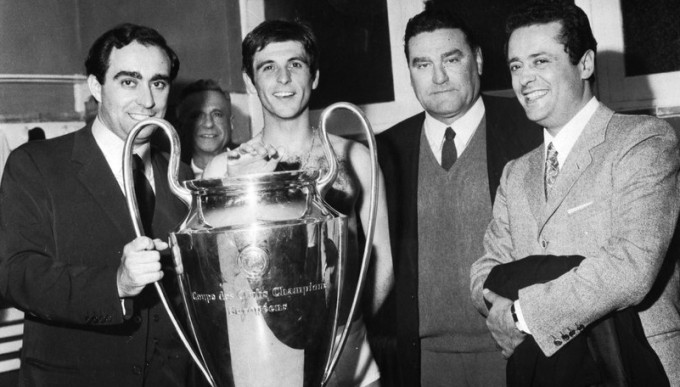
Carraro on the left holding the European Cup with Milan's Gianni Rivera, Nereo Rocco, and Jacopo Castelfranchi in 1969

Carraro worked in many high-profile roles in the public and private sectors. He was the president of the FISCNW from 1962 to 1976. From 1967 to 1973, he was also president of the International Waterski & Wakeboard Federation (IWWF). This period coincided with and was followed by senior roles at Milan, succeeding his father. More specifically, Carraro served as vice-chairman from 1966 to 1967 and then as chairman of Milan from 1967 to 1971. During this period under Carraro's chairmanship, Milan saw a series of domestic, continental, and international successes, including the 1967–68 Serie A league title, the 1967–68 European Cup Winners' Cup, the 1968–69 European Cup, and the 1969 Intercontinental Cup. As of November 2024, he was still the youngest club chairman to win the European Cup, later known as the UEFA Champions League, at 29 years and 143 days.

After his father's death in 1966, it was thought that Carraro would liquidate Milan, to which he later recalled: "That wasn't the case: we cut the squad around Rivera, Prati exploded, and we brought back Sormani, the first player in the world to undergo surgery for a herniated disc. We bought Cudicini by chance. We wanted Zoff from Mantua, but Italo Allodi, Inter manager, blocked us. Franco Evangelisti, Roma president, suggested Cudicini, explaining that he'd only sold him to Brescia because Oronzo Pugliese thought he was a trade unionist. Rocco agreed, on the condition that I take responsibility: 'They already criticize me for the veterans, I don't want anyone to say he's coming to Milan because he's from Trieste like me.'" Of the successes of Milan under him, he observed: "The credit goes to Nereo Rocco, the coach; Bruno Passalacqua, the general manager; and a team where young players blended with veterans. I asked Gino Palumbo to interview me in the Corriere della Sera to explain these things."

In the late 1960s and early 1970s, Carraro started his career in the FIGC, working in its technical sector. He was president of Italy's top two football leagues (Serie A and Serie B) from 1973 to 1976 and was president of the FIGC from 1976 to 1978. He began working with the FIGC as federal advisor from 1968 to 1972, then as vice-president from 1973 to 1976, and as president from 1976 to 1978 and from 2001 to 2006. On 19 May 1978, Carraro resigned from his FIGC roles to become president of CONI, a position he held until 1987, when he joined the Goria government. Before becoming president in 1978, he was also vice-president of CONI in 1977. As of October 2012, Carraro was still a member of CONI's Executive Committee and National Council.

=== From the 1980s to the 2000s ===
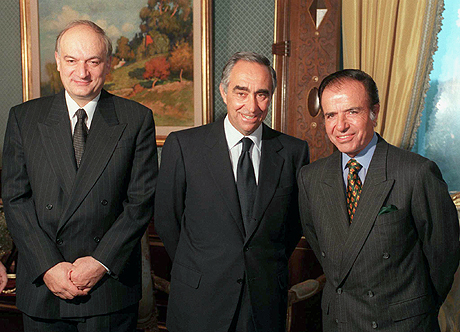
Carraro (centre) as a member of the IOC with the then Argentinian president Carlos Menem (right) in 1997

From 1982 to 2019, alongside Mario Pescante, Ottavio Cinquanta, and Manuela Di Centa, Carraro was a member of the IOC; per IOC policy, namely an age-limit fixed at 70 years old, except for members between 1966 and 1999, for whom the age limit is 80, Carraro retired in 2019 but was made an honorary member in 2020. In September 2000, he became part of the IOC's executive, a position he held until August 2004. In January 2002, he also became chairman of the Olympic Programme Commission. He was chairman of the Olympic Programme Working Group from 1998 to 2001. After acting as vice-chairman from 1983 to 1994, he became chairman of the Olympic Programme Commission in 2002. He was chairman of the Working Group of the IOC Commission 2000. He was also respectively member and vice-chairman of the IOC's Finance Commission from November 2000 to March 2004 and from 2001 to 2003. During his career at ICO, Carraro was member of many commissions, including those of Eligibility (1983–1989), Olympic Solidarity (1986–1987), and the IOC 2000 Reform Follow-Up (2002), and he was a member of the Reform Commission (January 2002–March 2003). He was also a coordinator of the Working Group Composition, Structure, and Organisation of the IOC 2000 Commission (1999).

The 1986 Italian football betting scandal, referred to as Totonero or Totonero bis, created a vacancy that Carraro would accept as the FIGC special commissioner from 1986 to 1987. The presidency would follow that of the Italia 90 Committee, the executive committee of the 1990 FIFA World Cup. In 1994, he became president of Impregilo, which was the biggest pole of Italian construction. He was president of Lega Calcio from 21 February 1997 to 28 December 2001. He was once again elected as president of the FIGC on 28 December 2001 and remained in this position until 8 May 2006. He was also a member of the UEFA executive board from 2004 to 2009. As of 2004–2005, Carraro led the FIGC as president, with Giancarlo Abete as deputy vice-president, Francesco Ghirelli, Giancarlo Gentile as secretary, Antonello Valentini, Gianni Petrucci as CONI president, Sergio Pagnozzi as CONI general secretary, Carlo Tavecchio as president of the National Amateur League (LND), and Gabriele Gravina as member of the FIGC's Federal Council.

Carraro began working with FIFA as a member of the Amateur Committee and the FIFA Board from 1978 to 1986. From 1980 to 1987, he was also president of the European Olympic Committees (EOC). He was president of the Organising Committees of the UEFA Euro 1980 and the 1990 FIFA World Cup. Around the same period, he was vice-president of the Association of National Olympic Committees (ANOC) from 1981 to 1987. In 1986, he became member of the FIFA World Cup Organising Committee, a position he held until 2009. From October 2002 to 2011, he was chairman of the FIFA Internal Audit. He was also a member of UEFA's European Union Matters Working Group from May 2003 to 2007, a Special Advisor to the UEFA Executive Committee from May 2003 to April 2004, and a member of the UEFA Executive Board from April 2004 to March 2009. From 2007 to 2009, he was vice-chairman of the UEFA Committee for National Team Competitions. Around the same timeframe, he was also chairman of the UEFA Marketing Advisory Committee and a member of the UEFA Finance Committee.

=== From the 2000s to the 2010s ===
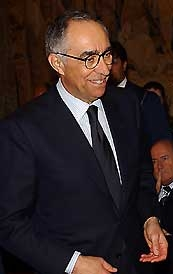
Carraro at the Quirinal Palace in 2003

In December 2001, Carraro was elected for a third term as president of the FIGC. Carraro's career was affected by conflict of interest allegations and accuses as he was chairman of Mediobanca, which was owned by Capitalia and was a major investor in Serie A clubs, particularly Lazio, Parma, and Roma. Lazio and Roma respectively went on to win the 1999–00 Serie A and 2000–01 Serie A league titles to Juventus' disadvantage, and he was accused of conflict of interest as he was co-owner of Lazio and Roma through his control of Capitalia, which he dismissed. The early 2000s under his presidency saw a series of scandals, most notably Passaportopoli, gifts to referees (notably Rolexes), (Note: Although the referee gifts affair involved other clubs, the most notable case of what became known as the Rolexes affair was that of Roma and its then chairman Franco Sensi, whose charges of sports fraud were dropped on the grounds that although the 1989 sports fraud law (enacted in the aftermath of Totonero bis) cited "other benefits" as examples of sports fraud, it was not considered fraud in 2000 and was cited in 2006 by the investigators of Calciopoli but as alleged evidence of Moggi's power.) and capital gains (plusvalenze) and false accounting; however, most of the clubs (among the top clubs involved were Inter, Lazio, Milan, and Roma) involved only received fines, in part because the involved clubs successfully lobbied to have the rules changed (in relation to Passaportopoli), despite also being investigated by ordinary justice or having received convictions by ordinary justice. (Note: Although it involved many clubs and football players, the most notable case was that of the then Inter football player Álvaro Recoba and technical director Gabriele Oriali. Around the same period of Calciopoli in 2006, Recoba and Oriali made a plea bargain for the crime of complicity in forgery relating to the procedures followed to make the player, who had no ancestors in Europe, become a European Union citizen and thus was registered by Inter as such (Inter had reached the limit for the number of non-European Union players and Recoba, without becoming a European Union citizen, could no longer be part of the club), and for the crime of receiving stolen goods relating to the Italian driving licence obtained by Recoba himself, which was part of a group of documents stolen from the Civil Motorization offices in Latina. Carraro himself was often being quoted as saying that he could not relegate Inter due to this violation (the rules stated that a club would receive an automatic loss plus one penalty point for every match in which an illegally registered player played) because the then Inter owner Massimo Moratti had spent a lot of money in football. Lawyer and sports law expert Eduardo Chiacchio said that Carraro was the main reason why Inter was not relegated, which could have instead saved one of the relegated clubs, citing Napoli, at the end of the 2000–01 Serie A league season. Of the scandal and Carraro's role, Chiacchio said: "In 2001 there was the scandal of false passports, above all that of Recoba. By the rules, Inter had to have a point-deduction for each match played with the Uruguayan player on the pitch. [The then Napoli chairman] Ferlaino asked me to take action because Moratti's Inter could be given 23 penalty points and so it was Inter and not Napoli which would be relegated." It was argued that as the season was over, the decision rested on Carraro, who decided to be lenient (as were the sentences of the sports proceedings after a rule change), and Chiacchio added that "Inter was saved because no one had the courage to appeal to justice. Calciopoli was just the tip of the iceberg.")

All Serie A and Serie B clubs, except for Juventus and Sampdoria, heavily benefitted from the Italian Law 91/1981, Article 18B (2003), best known as Decreto Salvacalcio ("Football Saving Decree") and signed by the second Berlusconi government and thus seen by critics and other observers as one of Berlusconi's many ad personam laws since he was chairman and owner of Milan, which was one of the clubs to benefit the most from the law, alongside Inter, Lazio, Parma, and Roma. In relation to the failure of Parma as a result of Parmalat's bankruptcy in 2003, Carraro later recalled: "Calciopoli has little to do with that either. I was the one who introduced very strict rules for league registration in the early 2000s: you had to be in good standing with taxes, salaries, and contributions, you couldn't have any debts, and you needed a healthy debt-to-equity ratio. Registration for Napoli and Fiorentina cost money; there were cities I couldn't go to for safety reasons. Then the FIGC relaxed everything in the summer of 2007."

On 14 February 2005, Carraro was re-elected as president of the FIGC after a deal with Fiorentina owners that would see his deputy Abete replacing him in two years and the appointment of then Palermo chairman Maurizio Zamparini as a counter-power to then Milan vice-president Adriano Galliani who was also president of Lega Calcio; Carraro supported the status quo and the re-election of Galliani. Although Juventus was simply one of the many clubs supporting his re-election (including Inter, with only Fiorentina at the opposition before a deal was made), and it was mainly other clubs that benefitted from sports justice leniency in the earlier 2000s scandals, the 2004–2005 FIGC elections became a significant part of the 2006 sports proceedings and Calciopoli criminal trials despite its contradictions (Abete, who benefitted from the alleged criminal deal, was not implicated or affected by the scandal, was not charged by sports and ordinary justice of any violation or crime, and regularly completed his term after Carraro's resignation, and Carraro himself was acquitted despite sports and ordinary justice sanctioning the Fiorentina and Juventus directors for it as part of the alleged operation to save Fiorentina from relegation), and the deal was seen as evidence that Fiorentina had joined the alleged criminal system. The elections confirmed the roles of two Milan men (Carraro and Galliani), and although Juventus during those years was close in sports politics with Milan, this was mainly due to TV rights and sponsors, and was not reflected on the pitch, where the Juventus–Milan rivalry was at its highest point.

In a July 2007 interview to the Corriere della Sera as a member of the IOC, Carraro described doping in sport as a "plague of society", and asked by Tommaso Pellizzari whether the fight against doping could ever be won, he responded: "Never. But we have to keep doing it." In 2009, Carraro became chairman of the Giulio Onesti Foundation. In November 2024, he said that Italian sports owed everything to Onesti (his predecessor as president of CONI), and compared him to Enrico Mattei with Agip, stating that he had "purged it of its fascist roots, understood its social value, and overturned the pyramid: now it's the base that chooses the top. Thanks to him, Italy, a few years after losing the war, hosted the Winter and Summer Games. He also described the Totocalcio as a "stroke of genius" for having convinced the staunch liberal Luigi Einaudi, at that time Italy's finance minister who Carraro said "wanted to keep all the proceeds for later redistribution", to leave "the bulk of the revenue to the CONI". Carraro recalled Onesti as saying to Einaudi: "'Would you trust the state?' Einaudi smiled: 'Okay, let's carry on like this.' And the CONI was able to finance itself."

=== From the 2010s to the 2020s ===
After Maurizio Beretta left the Lega Serie A presidency to work for UniCredit in 2011, Carraro was thought as a possible successor in what would be his first football role since Calciopoli. He was immediately opposed by smaller Serie A clubs. From 2011 to 2012, he was a member of the Extraordinary Commission of the Italian Winter Sports Federation (FISI). In July 2011, he became the special commissioner of the FISI, a position he held until 3 March 2012. In September 2013, Carraro said: "The fight against doping will be an ongoing one; it will never be won, but it must continue. The battles against racism and violence in stadiums can be won. Illegal betting is a global cancer, and sports authorities worldwide must collaborate with the judiciary and law enforcement." He also said that foreign investment is "a positive factor; it proves that our football has international appeal. In terms of global football TV rights, the Italian league is worth little, while the Premier League, England's top division, commands great prestige. Thohir, who purchased Inter, by showcasing the team to a TV audience of 140 million people, opens a bright window onto Italian Serie A football." Carraro's nomination at the head of the ultimately withdrawn project of the Rome bid for the 2020 Summer Olympics was rejected by the Monti government. During the tenure of Tavecchio as FIGC president, a return as chairman of the FIGC's Major Risks Commission was rumoured in 2015. In October 2016, Carraro took part to CONI's celebrations for the 50 years of the school of sports. On 23 April 2021, he was re-elected president of the board of directors of the Paralympic and Experimental Football Division, a position he held since 22 July 2020, with Gravina stating: "We will achieve all our goals."

In November 2024, Carraro again spoke about the status of Italian football, stating: "Italy had great companies, many of which have disappeared. The football 'business,' however, still exists, despite problems, vulgar fans, racism, and unsavory infiltration. Are the clubs in debt? Yes, but how many creditors boast of having money? Football deserves more respect: it attracts major interests and audiences are growing. On a technical level, however, it's a lean period for us." He quoted Sergio Mattarella as saying "if only all sectors of the country could do as well as sports..." Of his successors as presidents of CONI (Arrigo Gattai, Pescante, Petrucci, and Giovanni Malagò), he said: "Gattai wasn't up to the task; he didn't understand CONI. But I'm also to blame: I was prejudiced against Nebiolo and favoured Arrigo. Pescante is excellent and loves the international dimension of sport: passion, however, also involves a certain amount of emotion that's better not to have. Petrucci: a great manager. Malagò: he may have flaws, but his affection for the athletes is unique." As for the next president, he said: "I don't have a name. In 2026, we will host the Milan–Cortina Winter Games and the Mediterranean Games in Taranto, which are important for the government because of the Mattei Plan. I hope that, with respect to a reform that precludes Malagò from another renewal, there will be an exemption: it risks upsetting the balance." He described the public company Sport e Salute, which was pushed by Giancarlo Giorgetti, as the Meloni government's "operational arm", adding that "everything has changed, let's face it." As for who would succeed Thomas Bach as president of the IOC, he said that he was not sure and was too close as a friend of Juan Antonio Samaranch Salisachs, and feared that Bach had "a certain candidate in mind".

== Politics ==
=== Italian Socialist Party ===
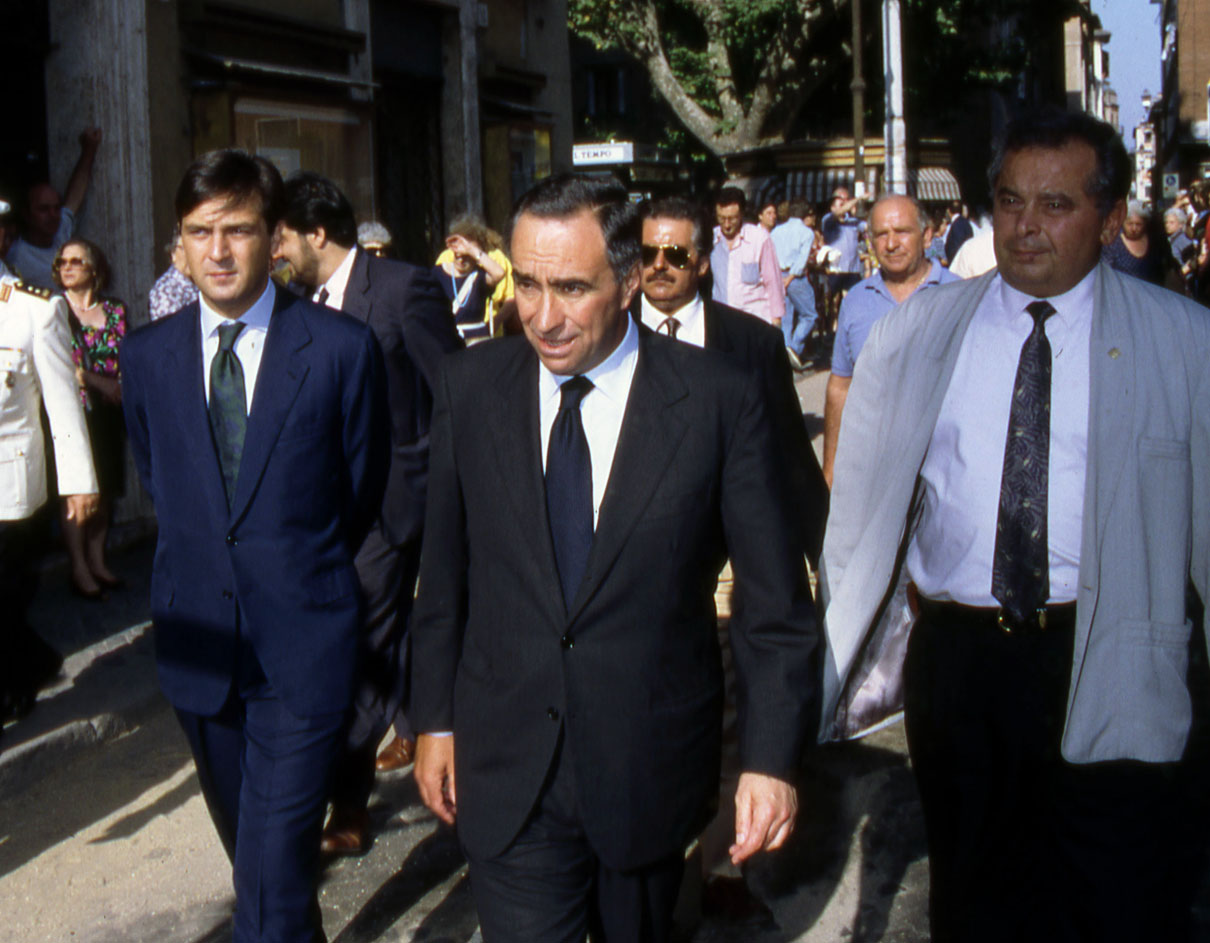
Carraro as the mayor of Rome in 1992

Carraro began his political career during the 1980s with the rise of Bettino Craxi. As a member of the PSI, Carraro was Minister of Tourism and Entertainment in the pentapartito governments led by Christian Democracy (DC) under three different prime ministers (Giovanni Goria, Ciriaco De Mita, and Giulio Andreotti) between 1987 and 1991, and he was the mayor of Rome from 18 December 1989 to 20 April 1993, after being elected by the city council. In his mayoral campaign, he was supported by actor Carlo Verdone and journalist Giuliano Ferrara.

Carraro was the mayor of Rome when the Tangentopoli scandal hit Italy. Although he was not personally involved, the phrase "Ah Franco, what do you need?" (A Fra', che te serve? in Romanesco dialect) became a catchphrase since the 1980s to describe the system of power and corruption of the First Italian Republic and later of Tangentopoli. The phrase was attributed to the building contractor Gaetano Caltagirone, who reportedly repeated it every time he received a phone call from Franco Evangelisti, a sports manager and DC politician who was very close to Andreotti. Evangelisti himself stated it in an interview on La Repubblica, and Caltagirone never denied it. In a 4 December 2014 interview with Umberto Croppi on La Stampa, Amedeo La Mattina spoke of Carraro and the "Ah Franco, what do you need?" mechanism, stating that it was "already in place during the time of Mayor Carraro, when they arrested his entire council." Since he was the mayor of Rome, the phrase also became associated with Carraro.

In October 2013, Carraro stated that Craxi was "a great statesman and a man of quality; history will repay a series of clichés that continue to unjustly haunt him." Of the Mani pulite pool of magistrates and Tangentopoli, as well as an alternative history of the Italian left, he said: "In hindsight, I would say he was the victim of a cruel fate, for he paid the price precisely when history proved the Socialists right and the Communists wrong. Perhaps, if he had considered an agreement with the PCI in the period following the fall of the Berlin Wall, perhaps foreseeing that it would be led by a figure like Giorgio Napolitano, a Communist who culturally represented a reformist movement, the history of the Italian left would have been different." Of the Goria government, Carraro recalled that it included "all the leading Christian Democrats of the time: Giulio Andreotti, Antonio Gava, Carlo Donat Cattin, Amintore Fanfani, and so on. Even to someone unfamiliar with the subtleties of politics like me, it was clear that everyone was talking 'to the mother-in-law so that the daughter-in-law will understand' and was preparing Goria's succession from the very beginning. The only one who supported him was Fanfani, probably aware that he was at the end of his career; he acted as Interior Minister with great rigor and seriousness, and it was clear that his views were not exploitative." Carraro later recalled that "Andreotti remains, even today, the government man with the best operational capabilities since the post-war period" and that the fall of De Mita, whom he described as a "person of great intellectual depth and excellent practical ability", explained "what Christian Democracy was, and why its most right-wing and left-wing members never loved Silvio Berlusconi."

=== Centre-right coalition ===
In the 2000s and 2010s, Carraro was part of The People of Freedom (PdL), and then joined the refounded Forza Italia (FI), the centre-right coalition political parties of Berlusconi, former Prime Minister of Italy and chairman of Milan, a club that he continues to sympathize with. A member of the Senate of the Republic first elected in the 2013 Italian general election for the PdL, Carraro was not among the party list's candidates of FI for the 2018 Italian general election. Having been proclaimed senator on 4 March 2013, he was a member of The People of Freedom Group from 19 March 2013 to 22 March 2018 (the group had changed its name to Forza Italia–The People of Freedom on 20 November 2013), and was a member of the 6th Standing Committee (Finance and Treasury), serving as its vice-president from 7 May 2013 to 20 January and again from 21 January 2016 to 22 March 2018, and the 14th Standing Committee (European Union Policies), serving as a member from 21 April 2015 to 10 March 2016.

In the early 2020s, Carraro remained politically close to Berlusconi, even as he continued to define himself as a socialist. Asked in November 2024 about his politics shifting from the PSI to the PdL and FI, and whether he was left-wing or right-wing, he replied: "I'm a socialist. I read Indro Montanelli and was struck by the reports from Hungary invaded by the Soviets: he explained that it wasn't true that Hungarian youth were against socialism and communism; if anything, they felt betrayed in their ideals. From there, I became a socialist, although I already had that idea and rejected the superiority that the communists believed they had over others." About Rome and whether it was unmanageable, he said: "It's a complicated city, with 2,777 years of history. It didn't have, like Paris, a Georges Haussmann who gutted and rebuilt everything. And the biggest mistake was not using EUR for offices. But EUR, as we know, was a fascist invention... Finally, I consider the Roman bourgeoisie less enlightened than the Milanese one." Asked about what the country needed in relation to tourism in Italy, owing to his experience as tourism minister, Carraro said: "You need to have functioning structures and ideas. Like Milan, which became a tourist destination by taking advantage of the collapse of the lira in 1992 and by developing its fashion district: within a few hundred meters are the most beautiful shops in the world." Of Berlusconi himself, Carraro recalled: "He offered me the job of senator, and I gladly accepted. But I accepted when I was retired: in politics, being a senator means relatively little. It's not true that he wanted to buy Inter. If anything, he already had a half-baked idea about Milan: we talked when I quit, but we couldn't reach an agreement."

== Business and other roles ==
Carraro was a member of the board of directors of the Italian Aircraft Registry from 1980 to 1987, served as vice-president of Alitalia from 1981 to 1987, was a member of the board of directors of the Independent Section for the Hotel and Tourism Business of the Banca Nazionale del Lavoro from 1982 to 1987, and was a member of the board of directors of the Istituto per il Credito Sportivo from 1983 to 1987. Carraro was chairman of the construction firm Impregilio from 1994 to 1999, chairman of Banca del Mezzogiorno – MedioCredito Centrale from 2000 to 2011, and member of the board of Mediocredito from 2011 to 2013. After acting as chairman of Impregilo from 2 March 1994 to 14 December 1999, he served on the company's board of directors from December 1999 to May 2002. Under his chairmanship, Impregilo incorporated Cogefar-Impresit, Lodigiani, and Girola in June 1994, becoming the leading Italian construction company and operating in 56 countries worldwide on every continent except Oceania. He was also chairman of the Venezia Nuova Consortium from 26 May 1995 to 25 February 2000 and chairman of the National Association of Environmental Protection Companies (ANIDA) from 19 April 1999 to 14 December 1999.

Carraro was vice-chairman of Mediocredito Centrale from 22 December 1999 to 27 April 2000 and was chairman of UniCredit from 27 April 2000 to 1 August 2011, later becoming a member of the board of directors. Carraro was also chairman of Sofipa from 28 January 2000 to 28 December 2001, chairman of Mediotrade from 13 April 2000 to 2 May 2001, chairman of IPSE 2000 from 28 November 2000 to 22 February 2001 and until April 2002 was a member of the board of directors, and was chairman of Fondi Immobiliari Italiani SGR from 24 April 2001 to 3 July 2008. He was a member of the board of directors of Capitalia from July 2002 to November 2003. In September 2003, he became chairman of Smeralda Holding, the company owning Sardegna Resorts (Hotel Cala di Volpe, Hotel Cervo, Hotel Pitrizza, and Hotel Romazzino) in Porto Cervo Marina, the Cantiere Porto Cervo shipyard, and Pevero Golf. That same month, he also became chairman of Shardana and Land Holding, two companies owning 2,500 hectares of land on the Costa Smeralda. On 29 July 2011, he became chairman of the Giulio Onesti Foundation. On 27 July 2011, he also became a member of the board of directors of the Teatro dell'Opera di Roma foundation.

== Calciopoli ==
=== Scandal and resignation ===
In 2006, it emerged that Carraro was involved in Calciopoli, which led to his resignation on 8 May 2006, as he was the president of FIGC, after the transcriptions of a series of wiretaps were made public, violating the law as they were part of an active investigation, in a climate reminiscent of a trial by media rather than a fair trial. (Note: The origins of Calciopoli date back to a 2004 investigation by the Turin's Public Prosecution Office led by Marcello Maddalena. A respected magistrate and public prosecutor, who was not known to be lenient or garantista, and in a book-length interview with the often pro-prosecution journalist Marco Travaglio said that "the moment immediately following the arrest was a 'magical moment'...", Maddalena requested the dismissal of all charges, ranging from criminal conspiracy to sports fraud and corruption, after his own investigation not only did not find anything penally relevant but found evidence in support of acquittal. Although many more wiretaps were made in subsequent years, critics and observers who supported in retrospect Maddalena's views said that they were not much different from the ones analysed from Maddalena, underling the circumstantial evidence and subjectivity of the Calciopoli affair. For example, Christian Rocca was a strong supporter of Maddalena's views and conclusions.) Despite his resignation, which came after widespread pressure from political and sports circles and the media, he remained on the UEFA's executive committee and as a FIFA official. His decision to resign was met with unanimous support. Carraro denied any wrongdoing and said he resigned in the interest of football. (Note: In his resignation letter, Carraro wrote: I remember that we have always respected the rules. There was only one exception in the summer of 2003 when we decided to expand the Serie B squad by forcing the regulatory procedures. It was a painful decision, "the lesser of two evils" given the climate that had arisen and of the indispensability of starting the championships on the scheduled dates. An extraordinary decision permitted by a state law and approved by CONI. Faced with a serious and painful affair such as the one that arises from the material sent to us by the Turin Public Prosecutor's Office and in the face of the developments that could arise from the ongoing investigations by the Rome and Naples Public Prosecutor's Offices, I do not think that the football world can afford that some insiders and some representatives of public opinion discuss the advisability of the Federal President continuing to exercise his functions. The commitments of the [Italian Football] Federation in the coming days and months are such and so many that a federal summit is needed in full capacity and concentrated on them.) Carraro later said that he resigned because "I made some sports policy mistakes. My presence would have weakened the institution, and so, even though no one asked me to, I resigned. However, I don't regret the calls."

Earlier on 4 May 2006, Petrucci intervened as the CONI president, asking the FIGC for an expedited investigation, and Carraro, who declared himself "dismayed, sad, and angry", accepted his request and said: "We will be swift and severe." To revitalize football, many were calling for a radical overhaul of the FIGC leadership, starting with Carraro, who was criticized by the press for failing to exercise adequate oversight. Calciopoli initially involved Fiorentina, Juventus, Lazio (of which future Calciopoli appeal judge Piero Sandulli was associated with and of which in the past Carraro had been accused of conflict of interest), and Milan (of which Carraro had been a long-time supporter and former chairman), although many other clubs were implicated in later years when all alleged violations were time-barred. Carraro was accused of favouring Fiorentina, Juventus, and Lazio. Critics and other commentators observed that Juventus was the only team that Carraro did not in fact favour, citing his wiretaps, and that he favoured Milan, the club of which he had been chairman and was a tifoso, as argued among others by Moggi.

In an August 2020 interview to Il Fatto Quotidiano, Carraro recalled: "In February 2006, Marcello Maddalena called me, asking to meet: he was in Rome, and we met at the anti-mafia office. The Turin Prosecutor's Office, he told me, had conducted a lengthy investigation involving Juventus: nothing criminally relevant had been found, the investigation had been closed, but the material was being handed over to the FIGC to assess whether the members' behavior had violated loyalty and sports integrity. Well, in compliance with the principle of separation of powers, I handed the documentation over to Prosecutor Palazzi that same day. It wasn't my job to examine it." In September 2025, he recalled all the sentences of the sports proceedings and ordinary justice, and reiterated: "I therefore believe it is necessary to remember that the GUP [preliminary-hearing judge] of Naples, the Court of Cassation, the Court of Auditors, the TAR [Regional Administrative Tribunal] of Lazio, the highest level of sports justice, have recognized my innocence, defining my behavior as 'institutionally correct'."

In several interviews, including his own memoirs in 2017, Carraro reiterated his views that Calciopoli came as a result of Paolo Bergamo and Pierluigi Pairetto (the then managers and designators of referees) finding out through Leonardo Meani (a former assistant referee as linesman who was at that time Milan's officer for public relations with referees) that the then still active referee Pierluigi Collina (with whom Galliani and Meani had relations) was going to replace them. As a result of this, he argued that Bergamo and Pairetto allegedly asked the help of the then Juventus general manager Luciano Moggi, with whom until then they had correct relations (according to Carraro), in order to keep their roles. Most notably, Carraro claimed that the alleged irregularities began in September 2004 when he thought that it was time to change them. Among others, Moggi denied this reconstruction, calling it "a hoax". (Note: Carraro's reconstruction was denied and rebutted by the referee designators themselves, with Bergamo stating that he had already decided to resign at the end of the season, and Carraro himself appeared to fire Bergamo, if not immediately, he let him known that this would have been his last year after the Roma–Juventus match in March 2005. Bergamo said that the dinners he and Pairetto had with the club directors, which became a central part of the sports proceedings and Calciopoli trials even though it was never known what they discussed, were not limited to Moggi and Giraudo. Bergamo and Pairetto also had dinners with Galliani of Milan and Moratti and Facchetti of Inter, among others, and rather than discuss illicits or fix matches, they were about FIGC politics and the future of the referee designators, as Bergamo wanted to tell the same clubs who had first decided to appoint him in 1999 during a dinner at Carraro's house that he was going to retire at the end of the season. For Bergamo's reconstruction, see Il calcio è uguale per tutti, 8 February 2020: "[Nannetti] What was your relationship with Moggi like? What was discussed at the dinners/lunches with him and Giraudo? [Bergamo] Actually, it was just one dinner, before Christmas, organized by Pairetto to exchange Christmas greetings. But it's true, I've always had a friendship with Moggi: every year I went to Siena to see the Palio, I'm a Torre supporter. Then I often stopped at Moggi's in Monticiano, and I even attended his father's funeral, whom I knew well. So, the dinner: Pairetto told me that Giraudo would also be there, which wasn't a problem for me. But it's just a dinner; between the three of them, I wasn't at the ones the following year. But I spoke to Pairetto afterwards: he was also a friend of Moggi and his father, and they even graduated together. Essentially, there were friendships that transcended professional and football. In any case, I've never hidden anything: I even had dinner with Facchetti. I later invited Galliani, too, but he couldn't come. You see, it was my last year, and I already knew I'd be resigning. In a way, I wanted to leave on good terms with these directors. I've never had anything to hide. Perhaps this friendship of mine is a casualty, but at the time, I didn't see it as casualty.") Carraro's historical reconstruction appeared self-exculpatory and as an attempt to exonerate himself and improve his image from criticism that he did not do anything about it. It was supported by Marco Bellinazzo in his 2018 book La fine del calcio (The End of Football) but was criticized as unreliable and questioned on the grounds that the alleged irregularities began in September 2004 because that was when the telephone of prominent football figures began to be wiretapped. In fact, an earlier investigation on the combriccola romana (an alleged gang of Roman referees that was a significant part of Calciopoli but that the same investigative team and prosecution later reached the conclusion that it never existed) dating back to the 2003–04 Serie A league season revealed the existence of telephone conversations similar to the ones that became the bulk of Calciopoli.

=== Sports proceedings ===
The sentence by the FIGC's Federal Appeals Commission, as the sports proceedings controversially started directly from the appeal rather than first-instance, issued him a ban of 4 years and 6 months that was later replaced by a fine of €80,000, which was controversial (the first-instance sentence was issued by judges, led by former Constitutional Court of Italy judge and president Cesare Ruperto, appointed by the FIGC special commissioner Guido Rossi, while the second-instance sentence was issued by judges, led by Sandulli, a former Lazio club lawyer who had been appointed by Carraro during his presidency), as was the dismissal of all charges against him by the preliminary hearing judge. In an interview to Il Romanista in July 2006, Sandulli said of Carraro's position: "We listened to his phone call several times. Carraro doesn't say a team should be favoured or another team should be deceived. He says that things should be done properly and avoid mistakes because there's a hot spot. It's not like he altered the outcome of a match."

Despite being acquitted of match-fixing and attempted match-fixing already in the first-instance sports proceeding, unlike all the other clubs found guilty of at least one direct Article 6 violation, Juventus was ultimately the only club to be relegated to Serie B through a sum of three Article 1 (a minor violation) violations that would have been equivalent to an Article 6 violation. It was the appeal sentence led by Sandulli, widely seen as a man of Carraro, that saved Fiorentina and Lazio from relegation and reduced Milan's penalty points enough that the club could still controversially take part to and win the 2006–07 UEFA Champions League. Mario Serio, one of the appeal judges who was in favour of a conviction for Carraro and stronger sanctions for Milan, later stated in a July 2006 interview to La Repubblica that there was disagreement among them and that their decisions (to condemn Juventus and save the other clubs) were ultimately affected by "the popular sentiment", which was widely against Juventus and for clemency for the other clubs.

=== Criminal trial ===
The main accusator and source of the allegations was Franco Baldini, who was described in the first-instance sentence as "the great prompter of the prosecution". At that time, Baldini had left Roma as sporting director and was rumoured to join Juventus to replace Moggi, with the then Juventus CEO Antonio Giraudo also rumoured to be replaced by the new club management after the deaths of the Agnelli brothers. In a lengthy interview on the TV programme Parla con me on Rai 3 with TV presenter and Roma supporter Serena Dandini in 2005, a year prior to the scandal, Baldini spoke about an alleged system that dominated the football world, making not-so-subtle criticisms of football figures, including Carraro. Calciopoli investigator Attilio Auricchio, at that time with the rank of major (later promoted to lieutenant) who in the past had been accused of evidence tampering related to wiretaps and became controversial in the history of Calciopoli due to the handling of the investigative team led by him, decided to invite him to collaborate in the investigation into the football world. In a telephone conversation with the then FIGC vice-president Innocenzo Mazzini, Baldini stated: "I'm preparing a 'turnaround' in the world of football because that's what I live for now. But if you behave, perhaps I'll save you. I was careful not to mention your name; I mentioned Galliani, Carraro, Giraudo, but not you."

Initially accused in the sports proceedings of being part of the alleged Cupola to steer the 2004–05 Serie A league season, his two criminal charges of sports fraud (ChievoVerona–Lazio and Lazio–Parma) were dropped on 3 October 2008. On 18 May 2009, Italy's Supreme Court of Cassation upheld the decision due to lack of evidence. As a result, the role Carraro had in the Calciopoli trials was no longer as defendant but as witness. Carraro himself had encouraged football directors and other football figures to talk to, and discuss any issue with, the referee designators, seeing this as a way to avoid polemics and improve relations rather than make public complaints, preaching a "let's love each other" (volemose bene in Romanesco dialect) attitude. That was why the Calciopoli wiretaps ultimately involved two thirds of the then Serie A clubs, as speaking to the referee designators was not against the rules, was done in other European leagues like England and Spain, and was officially prohibited across the major European leagues only after the scandal, and Bergamo (one of the referee designators involved in the scandal) had stated from the beginning that all clubs, not just Juventus, talked to them (as it was not against the rules and was encouraged by Carraro and the FIGC management) but was ignored and not believed in 2006. During an interview on 13 December 2019, Bergamo said: "I've always been independent: I asked Carraro for a full-time contract when I accepted the role and I had a business (I managed 11 agencies for a well-known insurance company) that was going full blast, so I had total independence." Despite the scandal, having been acquitted in the sports proceedings and of all criminal charges, Carraro was made an honorary member of the FIGC.

In December 2009, Carraro criticized the decision by the Juventus management under Andrea Agnelli to display at the upcoming Juventus Stadium the 29 league titles won on the pitch, stating that the club had no right to do so, at least until the end of the Calciopoli trials. In later years, with the end result of the Calciopoli trials being the statute of limitations and that the standings had not been altered (contradicting the controversial sports proceedings findings that Juventus had altered the standings even without altering a single match), he came to agree with the club's views that Juventus had legitimately won on the pitch the two revoked Serie A league titles, although he maintained that the club should not claim the two revoked scudetti, citing the sentences, and stated that they should be left unassigned, citing FIGC precedents. In November 2024, he recalled of his position, stating: "They acquitted me, on the grounds that 'he behaved in an institutionally correct manner.' The sports justice system didn't have the courage to do so; I had to go all the way to the TAR. In any case, in my sports life, I've chosen to hold only unpaid positions, with the exception of the presidency of the CONI." In a September 2025 interview to La Gazzetta dello Sport, Carraro reiterated his view that Calciopoli was born as a result of his political error for not replacing Bergamo and Pairetto, expressing his view that a referee designator should not be the same for more than 5 years. His justification for not doing so was the UEFA Euro 2004 elimination and Napoli's financial problems.

=== Wiretaps ===
In one intercepted phone call ahead of the 28 November 2004 Serie A match between Inter, which would benefit with the scudetto of the 2005–06 Serie A league title at the time of the scandal but was later charged of Article 6 warranting relegation when it was time-barred by the statute of limitations, and Juventus, the sole club to be controversially relegated to Serie B, (Note: The background context for the match goes back to three weeks before, when the Reggina–Juventus match saw two missed penalties and a regular goal annulled to Juventus' disadvantage. In response, Moggi, who was later charged by the prosecution as part of the Calciopoli scandal of forming a criminal conspiracy with Carraro, among others, told in an intercepted phone call that he had closed the match's referee, Gianluca Paparesta, in the locker room as punishment, something that was later revealed to be Moggi's bravado and boastfulness; the court ruled that the event did not happen and the charge of kidnapping was dismissed. Despite the Reggina–Juventus controversy, Paparesta was put in the match's referee grid (the referees in the grid were then randomly selected through a drawing lots, a form of sortition procedure that was judged to be regular by both sports proceedings and ordinary justice, in contrast to insistent claims by the prosecution that the procedure was rigged), along with Paolo Bertini, Collina, Stefano Farina, and Rodomonti. Heading into the match, Facchetti had phone conversations with members of the refereeing world. Facchetti called Gennaro Mazzei (the then designator of assistant referees) on 25 November, and expressed doubts about Bertini and his preference for Collina, appearing to suggest that the drawing lots procedure be rigged in order to select Collina by adding to the grid several referees that could not be put in due to preclusion rules. In a call with Bergamo on 26 November, two days before the match, he reiterated his preference for Collina and his doubts about Bertini, possibly influencing Carraro and Bergamo's decision to instruct Rodomonti, the selected referee for the match through the drawing lots, to not make any mistakes to the advantage of Juventus and instead to favour Inter if in doubt. In addition, there were Lega Calcio elections the day after the match, which significantly concerned Carraro, who wanted to avoid controversies and any polemic after the always important Derby d'Italia.) Carraro asked Bergamo to avoid any favour for Juventus if in doubt. (Note: Transcription of the phone call: Carraro: Who's there, at Juventus... Bergamo: Rodomonti... Inter–Juventus... Carraro: Please that he doesn't help Juventus, for God's sake, which is a very delicate match in a very delicate moment in Lega [Calcio], etc., for God's sake, that he doesn't help Juventus, that he lets them play an honest match for heaven's sake, but that he doesn't make mistakes in favour of Juventus please... [the investigators put "mistakes" in scare quotes even though Carraro did not do so or mean to do so, as he explained in his deposition] Bergamo: ... don't worry, I'll talk to him tomorrow morning when he trains so that his head stays fresh Carraro: He has to referee the match correctly but that he doesn't make mistakes for goodness sake in favour of Juventus because otherwise it would be a disaster, in short Bergamo: In any case, he hasn't refereed Juventus for a long time, dottore, we put him in precisely because it's been two-three years, so no, no... he was one of those who... Carraro: Look, I'm not interested, in the sense that... if Collina was there, even if he made a mistake, no one says shit but... Rodomonti, if he makes a mistake in favour of Juventus, God's wrath ensues, since then there's... since keep in mind that it is played on Sunday evening, on Monday there is the election of Lega [Calcio] etc ... it would be disastrous stuff, in short... Bergamo: It is my concern to talk to him tomorrow, dottore Carraro: All right, don't forget, thank you, goodbye About this phone call, the motivations of the first-instance sentence of the criminal trial in Naples read: "We have also already mentioned the lack of sense of responsibility shown [by Bergamo] ... as well as the submissive behavior shown by Bergamo by telephone on 26/11/04 with Carraro, who suggested him that he gives the absurd suggestion to the referee not to make a mistake in favour of one team, a suggestion which, if sent to the referee, could also have been interpreted as a message to favour the other team." Critics accused Carraro of favouring Milan, which benefitted from the draw result, with Moggi stating in 2025 that "obviously he didn't mean to help the Nerazzurri, but Milan in case of a misstep by Juve.") On the matchday, after pressures from Carraro, Bergamo told referee Pasquale Rodomonti to favour Inter when in doubt; (Note: Transcription of the phone call: Bergamo: Don't forget Pasquale because you struggled to get there, to return there, and therefore I expect, believe me, that you won't miss anything, nothing, for anyone... Rodomonti: I'm immensely pleased with what you said because it's the truth Bergamo: Above all, there's a difference between the teams of 15 points, understood, so also prepare well psychologically... you must not question the efforts you've endured... so referee your match, there is none for anyone, so... if I tell you mine right now if you have a doubt think more about who is behind rather than who is in front Rodomonti: All right, all right Bergamo: Listen to me, it's something that remains between you and me... Rodomonti: On my word, thank you, don't worry Bergamo: Because getting up there you know how tiring it is, going back down... it would be really stupid for you... Rodomonti: All right Bergamo: Be an intelligent person... it stays between you and me, I hope Rodomonti: Don't worry A few minutes later, Bergamo contacted the FIGC's secretary Maria Grazia Fazi to inform her that he had spoken to Rodomonti, telling her "the matter isn't clear, it's more than clear... more than clear." While the phone call involving Carraro was present in the investigative reports of the Carabinieri, the one involving Bergamo and Rodomonti was not contained in any report and was made public, among many others as part of the Calciopoli bis developments in the 2010s, by Moggi's defence. It was first listened in a Gold TV broadcast on 14 April 2010.) the match, which ended 2–2, was well refereed but saw a clear mistake favouring Inter, as also stated by two respected and non-implicated referees like Collina and Roberto Rosetti, with Collina in particularly held in high regard for his impartiality and reliability by both Carraro and the prosecution. (Note: Transcription of the phone call: Collina: Paolo, hello, I was calling you back on your home number. Bergamo: Ah, you called me, yes indeed... Collina: ... well it seems to me, apart from that, how does Toldo seem to you? In my opinion it was full red, really full red [card]... but you know I understand that it's not easy, but it seems to me good for the rest Bergamo: The other episode, that of Adriano is nothing because he pushed first... Collina: No, there's nothing, he was right to whistle like that too... now let's hope that whoever makes the comments later in the broadcasts... Bergamo: In fact, Gigi called me... because he immediately gets scared, however... let's wait for the comments, in short, because we'll talk to each other as best we believe, in conclusion... Collina: Yes, no it's red there, it's full red there, it's really full red In an interview to La Gazzetta dello Sport, Bergamo defended Rodomonti's choice of not having sent off the Inter goalkeeper; in private, he disagreed. In an intercepted phone call with his fellow referee designator Pairetto, he admitted that Toldo should have received a red card. In an intercepted phone call between Pairetto and referee Roberto Rosetti on 30 November, two days after the match, both agreed that Rodomonti had made a mistake. In February 2020, Bergamo gave his own view of the events, confirming Carraro's deposition that there was a media bias against Juventus in that a mistake in its favour would result in a controversy beyond its proportions and end a referee's career, stating: "That's why I tell him he worked so hard to get back to playing such an important match, because we knew how football was: if he'd made another mistake in favour of Juventus, he'd be 'dead.' Of course, I'm not telling him to award a penalty against Juventus, but in the event of a dubious incident, not to go in favour of Juventus.") In his deposition, (Note: Transcription of Carraro's deposition: Prosecutor Narducci: Mr. Carraro, would you comment on the phone call? This is my question. Carraro: The logic of my phone call is simple, Collina as referee was a referee considered by everyone above the parties, and considered among the best referees in the world, when Collina made a mistake everyone assumed good faith, when a referee like Rodomonti refereed, that he was certainly a good referee but not with the external "credibility" of a Collina, with the fame, with the reputation of Collina, every mistakes was considered almost as the result of something that was not accidental, or that could not be accidental, so I say "don't forget, it's a very delicate match." The following day there was the election of the president of Lega Calcio, which is an election that didn't concern me directly, but since all the clubs would have met the day after for this election, if the outcome of the Juventus–Inter match had it been an outcome in which a referee mistake had been decisive, according to public opinion, in the result of the match itself, the controversies would have multiplied by 6.28 because all the presidents would have been questioned, each one would have had his say, etc. etc. this was the spirit of my phone call. Prosecutor Narducci: So, according to your assessment, the one you express clearly in the conversation with Bergamo, instead you absolutely didn't take into consideration that Rodomonti could indeed make mistakes during the match but in favour of the other team, Inter? Carraro: A referee can always make mistakes, the more important a match is, the more delicate it is, the more it is followed by the public, the more the referee's mistake occurs, especially in Italy because abroad it is not like that, [so] emphasized. I repeat, Collina at that time had a national and international prestige which meant that, even if he was wrong, public opinion accepted the mistake. One is a very reputed chef, he makes a wrong dish, people say 'oh well, it means he just made a mistake.' Rodomonti is a lower-level chef, despite being an excellent chef, if he makes a mistake people say 'then this guy is incapable', or 'he wanted to cook not well', this is the meaning of my call. President Casoria: But the public prosecutor asked why you were worried that Rodomonti made mistakes in favour of Juventus and not Inter? Prosecutor Narducci: Why didn't you worry about him not making mistakes absolutely? Carraro: Because the media, in general, of the time, written press, radio, television... in general public opinion, Juventus was a "very powerful" club, [while] Inter was considered, at that time, less authoritative in terms of sport politics, for which a mistake in favour of Inter was considered a mistake, a mistake in favour of Juventus would have led to a reaction of public opinion. This is what it seemed to me to be, because I always talk about my personal feelings. At the time, this phone call involving Carraro was read and understood by the investigators in a colpevolisti ("guilty") stance, namely that even Carraro, as the FIGC president, was aware of a criminal conspiracy to fix matches, a charge by the prosecution that Carraro rejected in his deposition, and instead discussed of an unequal treatment in media reactions to Juventus' disadvantage.) Carraro testified he said those words because he was aware that any mistake, no matter if in good faith, favouring Juventus would cause controversy, whereas mistakes that disadvantaged or penalized Juventus would cause no controversy; he wanted to avoid controversy because the match came ahead of the Italian football elections.

In one intercepted phone call with Bergamo, Carraro spoke to Bergamo of the failure to report the then Reggina chairman Pasquale Foti's behavior in a match against Lazio, stating that "Foti was with [the referee] for ten minutes during half-time... making a fuss about this stuff... ... the referees there can't let anyone in during half-time, they have to refuse, because a club president can't go during half-time of matches there..." (Note: For an outburst after a controversial match against Reggina, Moggi was even charged of kidnapping for having allegedly closed in the locker room Paparesta, who was the match's referee. Although Moggi was acquitted and Paparesta denied that he was ever closed in the locker room, the myth persists and is seen as an example of unequal treatment as other directors not only had strong arguments with referees but they did so during half-time, which was against the rules, whereas it was allowed to do so after the match as Moggi did, and it was not uncommon for those incidents to not be reported by the referees, as also shown by Carraro's intercepted phone call with Bergamo.) Carraro was also implicated in the Roma–Juventus Serie A match on 5 March 2005, which saw several mistakes (not all of them being the fault of referee Salvatore Racalbuto) to the advantage or disadvantages of both teams, including to Juventus' disadvantage that were not shown in the highlights published in some newscasts but were in fact reported by La Gazzetta dello Sport (widely relied on by the prosecution and reputed to be an impartial and reliable source but not used for this charge), including a penalty kick disallowed in the 25th minute, a possible red card for Olivier Dacourt, a goal unfairly disallowed for Zlatan Ibrahimović (it was a mistake of the assistant referee Marco Ivaldi), and Landro Cufrè's punch to Alessandro Del Piero, which could have resulted in another red card.

In an intercepted phone call with Bergamo after the match, Carraro complained that Juventus received a penalty kick that was doubtful at normal speed as it was on the edge of the penalty kick area (it was later deemed to be regular thanks to the moviola), reiterating his view that referee decisions were seen as favouring Juventus, regardless on whether it was true or not. The Carabinieri led by Auricchio saw this as further evidence in support of Moggi's criminal conspiracy to favour Juventus. Bergamo responded to Carraro that "Racalbuto was prepared to do the opposite", implying (if true) that he either told him before the match to simply be careful due to being an important match in which any mistake could lead to controversy, or explicitly told him something along the lines of "think more about who is behind" (Roma) as he did for the Inter–Juventus match months earlier, and thus the argument goes that if anything, it was Carraro and Bergamo who may have committed the two sports frauds against Juventus. (Note: Transcription of the relevant part of the phone call: Bergamo: Hello? Carraro: Yes? Bergamo: It's Bergamo, dottore, tell me. Carraro: Ah, it's Carraro. Bergamo: Yes. Carraro: And, and, and... but you, I... I think... I don't know what to say. Bergamo, I, I really don't know what to say. I see you, you ask me to see, I see you, I tell you, please, if there's any doubt, for goodness sake, that, that, that the doubt isn't in Juventus' favour, after which it happens, will you [referring to the referee] give them that penalty kick? Bergamo: No, no, but it's not the penalty kick. Unfortunately, the assistant made a mistake, which... Carraro: No, the serious thing is the penalty kick! Look, the symptom, the symptom that... that I, evidently, am a person who doesn't count for shit, who doesn't count for shit. Bergamo: No Carraro: But, but, Bergamo, be careful. Bergamo: No Carraro: Be careful, because I'm fed up, I'm very fed up. The symptom that I don't count for shit is that a penalty kick is awarded that, in any case, is on the edge of the penalty kick area, it's on the edge of the penalty kick area! So, when a referee awards a penalty kick on the edge of the penalty kick area, it means that Juventus wants, needs to win the match. Bergamo: Well, this... Racalbuto was prepared to do the opposite... Carraro: Eh, well, evidently In 2020, Carraro recalled: "As I said, the situation got worse at a certain point. On the eve of an important match, Roma–Juve, I heard that the designated referee [Trefoloni] called in sick, and I was worried; also because someone who wasn't the best was sent in his place [Racalbuto]. And to Bergamo I said: 'At least in doubtful cases, please remember: don't favour Juve.' That time I was furious. There was no VAR, and the standard practice, for a foul on the edge of the penalty area, was to award a free kick: no one protested. On that occasion, however, the referee awarded the penalty, and I, who was on television, was furious: harsh words were exchanged with Bergamo.")

In relation to the Roma–Juventus match, critics observed that Carraro's statement was to the detriment of Juventus, as he implied that the club should be penalized if a decision is doubtful, even if later proven correct, and that while in the first case (Inter–Juventus of November 2004) the suggestion of Carraro was vague and general, in this case he had explicitily argued that a valid penalty kick should not have been awarded to Juventus only because it appeared doubtful and would have sparked controversy in the press and likely damaged Carraro's position. (Note: During the first-instance trial in Naples, the Juventus club lawyer Pino Vitiello made his arguments, which were summarized thusly: That said, Attorney Vitiello opened a parenthesis discussing the charges. These are the arguments, always based on law: • Some of the evidence gathered is invalid (e.g., the comments in sports newspapers, or some documents obtained without the required international rogatory). • The crime of conspiracy (criminal conspiracy) cannot exist. If, in these cases, the conspiracy is a crime against public order, where are these facts in the prosecution's allegations? When and on what occasion was public order disturbed? At best, one should have spoken of complicity in individual crimes of non-public interest, which is quite different from the existence of a conspiracy. And in any case, if public order is to be disturbed, actions aimed at disturbing it must be carried out. And where are these facts? • Even if there was a conspiracy, it should have influenced judges and referees. Carraro and Ghirelli were acquitted, no sports judge spoke of pressures, all the referees (except Nucini and Pirrone, who are a waste of time...) who were not charged denied ever having been pressured, there were always arguments between the referee designators and referees (the reference is to Nucini, and Mazzoleni is cited as speaking of a clash with Mattei, Bergamo and Pairetto's successor), sanctions were imposed by the referee designators against all [referees], especially those who made mistakes in favour of Juventus (Racalbuto was cited, having been suspended for a record time after Roma–Juventus), especially because Carraro wanted it that way (if Collina makes a mistake, who cares, but if someone else makes a mistake... woe betide anyone who makes a mistake favouring Juventus!). Finally, the definitive proof to the contrary: even Auricchio admitted that Juventus in the year under investigation scored more points with 'unfriendly' referees than with friendly ones: so where would the power to influence them be?) Instead Auricchio's investigative team considered this to be a sports fraud against Roma rather than Juventus, with further exculpatory evidence only becoming known in the appeal trial in Naples and still leading to the conviction of Racalbuto, despite the fact he suffered the longest suspension for a referee after a match, when one of the prosecution's key arguments was that the alleged co-conspirator referees were protected by the criminal conspiracy. In other intercepted phone calls, Carraro expressed concerns about Lazio and Fiorentina following real or perceived disadvantages, stating that the two clubs had to be helped in order to avoid their possible relegation to Serie B. In one intercepted phone call ahead of the Sampdoria–Fiorentina match, Carraro told Bergamo that "the important thing is that [the referee] doesn't damage them", referring to Fiorentina. Similar phone calls were done in relation to Lazio.

=== Views ===
In response to the controversies about his role in Calciopoli, Carraro said: "I want to be clear here. My call for Lazio–Brescia should be read alongside another call in which I explicitly stated: 'If Brescia is stronger, that they win.' Those were days when the newspapers were talking about the damage suffered by Lazio, and I wanted to defend the [Italian Football] Federation from suspicions... The same goes for Inter–Juve. My call was simply the gesture of a federation president who knows full well that, at that moment, he cannot allow a match in which favours are being done to Juve." He was still criticized on the grounds that "the only legitimate behavior for a federal president is to not intervene in any way" and that if he had suspicions, he should not have "called the referee but removed him and reported him". He defended the then Inter chairman Giacinto Facchetti, who had died in 2006 but was accused in the Palazzi Report (2011) of having violated Article 6 (a defamation claim against Moggi made by his son, Gianfelice Facchetti, was later rejected and the sentence acquitting Moggi, who had cited the Palazzi Report, became res judicata), stating that "Facchetti was a good person, extraordinarily honest. And I didn't like Palazzi's report on his actions at all."

In the 2010s, Carraro expressed his criticism of the scudetto awarded to Inter, especially because, as he recalled, "a month later Rossi goes to be president of Telecom for the second time, whose largest shareholder is Marco Tronchetti Provera, vice-president of Inter." He said that Moggi, who accused him of being the true head of the criminal conspiracy that culminated in Calciopoli, was a good football director despite his flaws, and that his downfall was being too pleased with appearing "ultra-powerful". He observed that the sentences said there was a criminal conspiracy but that his thoughts on Calciopoli "are much more complex". He agreed with Moggi that had the club owners Gianni and Umberto Agnelli not respectively died in 2003 and 2004, Juventus would have likely acted different in relation to the scandal and better defend the club rather than take what critics and Carraro himself claimed amounted to a plea bargain, which he said is also the reason why the club's damage claims against the FIGC for unequal treatment are inappropriate. Critics and Calciopoli defendants, having been told that Calciopoli would have fixed all football evils, that they were the rotten part of the system, and that Calciopoli represented the rebirth of a supposedly clean football, observed that Italian football continued to be affected by scandals and controversies. He responded: "Football has many problems, but I think it's wrong to exploit them. Let's talk about betting. They are the biggest threat to sport globally. Calciopoli has nothing to do with it."

Carraro maintained that Juventus was the best squad in the 2004–2006 years and had legitimately won on the pitch the two league seasons by 7 and 3 points, respectively, and not because of interferences; this is in line with both sports and ordinary justice sentences ruling there was no match-fixing and thus the 2004–05 Serie A league season (the 2005–06 Serie A league season was never an object of dispute or investigation) was regular. At the same time, Carraro alleged that the only time Juventus had been favoured was in the 1997–98 Serie A league season due to an alleged foul by Mark Iuliano (the Juventus defender) on Ronaldo (Inter's striker) worthy of a penalty kick, which was not given to Inter, and that continues to be controversial and debated; however, Carraro's claim is not supported by the ordinary justice trials, which found that "a tried-and-tested system that has been in operation since 1999/2000 between individuals who, under the guise of establishing 'friendly relationships', engaged in conduct aimed at distorting the true strength and potential of certain football teams." Additionally, Carraro himself was the highest-ranked official as president of Lega Calcio and it was the Ronaldo controversy in 1998 that resulted in the dismissal of referee designator Fabio Baldas in favour of Bergamo and Pairetto. (Note: The decision to appoint Bergamo and Pairetto was taken during a dinner at Carraro's house among the six most representative Italian football clubs. The Tuscanian Bergamo, politically left-wing and a historical member of the Italian Communist Party (PCI) from Livorno (Leghorn), was not supported by Juventus but by the other northern Italian clubs, and the Piedmontese Pairetto (closer to the centre-right coalition from Turin) was chosen by the Roman clubs for balance.)

In December 2020, Carraro stated that the only thing he blamed himself for Calciopoli was not having replaced Bergamo and Pairetto earlier with Collina as referee designator, (Note: Although unscathed by the scandal, Collina during the Calciopoli years was already rumoured as the new referee designator, as evidenced by wiretaps naming Carraro and involving Galliani, Meani, and Collina himself. Meani had phone conversations with Collina (at that time still an active referee), as well as with other referees like De Santis and Racalbuto, pushed for his role as referee designator as Collina appeared to dislike the role, and planned a secret meeting with Collina at his restaurant. In one intercepted phone call, Galliani referred to Bergamo and Pairetto as former referee designators, and Carraro himself essentially told Bergamo that he was fired after the Roma–Juventus match in March 2005. Although he was widely seen as the best referee in the world, as also recognized by Carraro, Collina was disliked by Juventus supporters due to his role in the club's loss of the 2000 scudetto, not stopping and postpone the club's final and decisive match in Perugia despite heavy rain, to Lazio's advantage, among other real and perceived mistakes to Juventus' disadvantage, and shared the same sponsor of Juventus rival's Milan (Opel). After retiring, Collina said that he was a supporter of Lazio. In one intercepted phone call, Meani stated that he called Carraro to complain vigorously about the state of Italian football, stating "there's too much shit".) and reiterated that Juventus would still have won had the scandal not happened because they were the best team. He also argued that Moggi did not really have the power that his critics claimed or that Moggi himself boasted, stating that while he was pleased when they called him "Lucky Luciano" and was "happy that victories were tied partly to his ability to select players and partly to his way of influencing referees", he "never managed to make Juve win a league in an illicit manner". He added: "Is Calciopoli based on nothing? There's not a cent involved. It's just a question of power, or perhaps just talk. Juve would have won those titles anyway. They had the best players and the best coaches: Lippi and Capello. In fact, in 2006 the national team based on Juve won the World Cup." Moggi responded to Carraro, criticizing for what he said about him (in reference to "Lucky Luciano"), stating that it was not true and that he did not wish "to hear people say 'well done': the gratification of the shareholder was enough for me", but shared his views about Calciopoli and spoke of a "Carraro redeemed".

== Personal life ==
=== Marriage and memoirs ===
Carraro is married, with two children, and resides in Rome, although he is considered to be a "Milanese by adoption". In 2017, the Milan-based Rizzoli Libri published Mai dopo le ventitré. Le molte vite di un riformista (Never After 11 PM: The Many Lives of a Reformist), Carraro's memoirs. In November 2024, Carraro said that he refused joining Freemasonry, elaborating: "Power manifests itself when decisions influence: positions, which are another matter entirely, have nothing to do with it. Am I a man of power? I don't think so, even though I've made decisions that have had an impact. But I've never had much influence, and I consider myself a good person. No one tried to tempt me. Once I was elected senator, they suggested Freemasonry. I replied: 'Now, at 73?...'" He also said that his maxim was thusly: "I don't tell lies, but sometimes the truth should be left unsaid. Otherwise, you're a suicide bomber."

=== Milan and Italy national football team ===
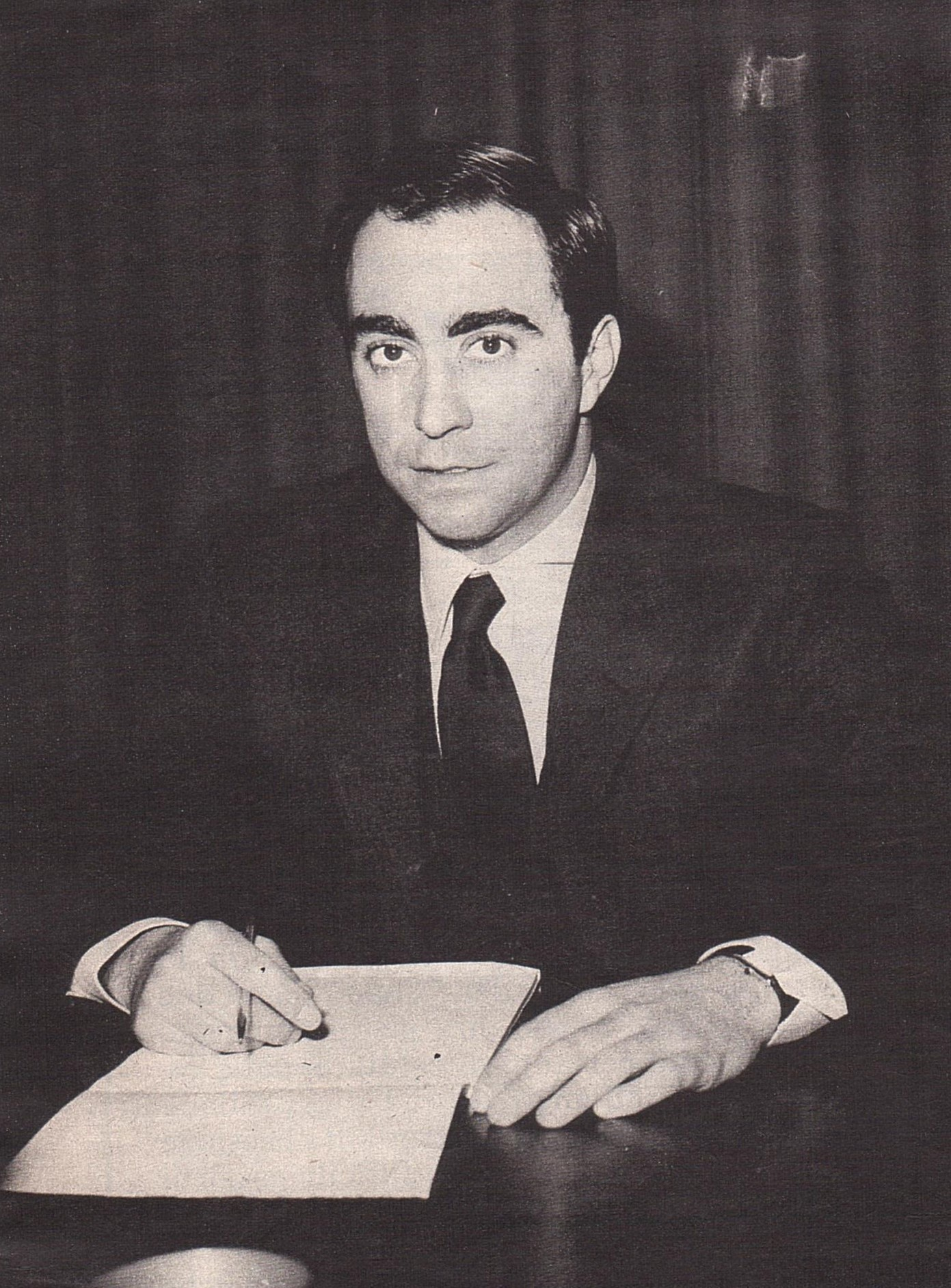
Carraro during his period as chairman of Milan from 1967 to 1971

In September 2013, Carraro cited Gianni Rivera, Gigi Riva, Pelé, and Diego Maradona as the football players who emotioned him the most, stating: "I've always been fascinated by Gianni Rivera's creativity and talent. In the national team, I'm most fond of Gigi Riva, the only one who transcends the role of a player and becomes a legend. Internationally, I'd mention Pelé, a natural phenomenon, and Maradona, who messed up in life but was a genius in football."

Carraro is a long-time supporter of the Milan football club, stating in March 2020: "I left the chairmanship [of Milan] in 1971. From then on, I've worked as a sports manager at various levels, and I've always had to be rational. I've always hidden my feelings, but it's clear that I'm a Milan supporter. And there's no doubt that since the departure of Berlusconi and Galliani, who in my opinion is the best sports manager around, the club has been going through a rough patch. However, we continue to hope that this will end and that a good period will return." Four years later, asked on whether he remained a supporter of Milan, Carraro reiterated: "They say you can change everything. But I change very little in everything: I've even been married for 49 years..."

In September 2025, Carraro said that after Milan, he was a supporter of Napoli, elaborating: "In 2004, I was dealing with two very serious problems: the unfortunate elimination from Euro 2004 and Napoli, which was in danger of disappearing, a situation that even President Ciampi was demanding an explanation for. We couldn't find anyone to sign him; it was a tragedy! Then De Laurentiis arrived, and since then, after Milan, I've been a Napoli fan." At the same time, he offered advices to Milan, stating: "Personally, I'd be very happy if Galliani returned, someone who knows everything about football and this club. Scaroni is a person of great quality, but Galliani is part of the club's history, and at Monza he proved he's top-notch. It would be an extraordinary boost of enthusiasm for the fans."

Also in September 2025, of the possibile absence of Italy from the 2026 FIFA World Cup, in what would be an unprecedented third consecutive missed FIFA World Cup qualification, Carraro said: "I don't even want to think about failing to qualify again. We'll make it. Gattuso? I remember him as a player in Italy, I often went to watch training: he's someone who was formal with the ball, not informally, but always gave 110%. The problem for me isn't so much the attachment to the shirt, but the fact that all football these days is structured around the national teams. They're always playing, and in those few days you have to create a chemistry that I can't say for what reasons it clicks or not. He was there at the 2021 European Championship, and in that case he could be called: Gianluca Vialli. About Gianluca Vialli, he said: "I have to reveal something about him: after the disastrous World Cup in Korea and Japan, Trap had a terrible start in the qualifiers for the European Championship in Portugal. Speaking with Giraudo, it came out that Vialli would be available to coach the national team. I went to meet him in Turin, but unfortunately the conditions weren't right."

== Legacy ==
During his 50-year long career, Carraro exerted significant influence across sports, politics, and business. He is considered among "the top football managers and experts in Italy", and was called the "Grand Old Man of Italian sport", to which he responded: "Old for sure, but I don't know if I'm great..." Of his own career, he said: "I only know how to be a president: I started at 22, elected to the top of water skiing. It was my sport, I was a European champion. Sometimes they call me a manager, but while on the one hand I know how to decide a strategy, on the other I don't know how to manage. I've never done that, and I don't even get involved in the ins and outs of management." He also said that he does not consider himself a man of power, as argued by critics and other commentators, saying that while he made impactful decisions, he never had that much influence attributed to him by his critics and that he considers himself to be a good person. As a result, he said that "people questioning my honesty hurt me. It's a thought that still hurts me today, even though I've been acquitted of everything."

Carraro's rise and fall at the head of the FIGC coincided with the rise and fall of the Italian football league (Serie A) as the top football European league between the 1980s and early 2000s (known as the "Golden Age of Italian Football", particularly the 1990s), coinciding with the fourth overall (after 1982) and last win (as of 2026) of Italy national football team at the 2006 FIFA World Cup, where numerous football players and other figures (from the head coach to the coach's technical staff) were from Juventus (or had been at Juventus) in the 2006 FIFA World Cup final won by Italy, as was also recognized by Carraro. Ultimately, the revolution of Calciopoli (often compared to the fall of the First Italian Republic, with critics describing it as a coup rather than a revolution) that reset the management of Juventus was followed by a counter-revolution, with Carraro's deputy Abete, Antonio Matarrese, Galliani, Della Valle, and Lotito all holding key positions of power. In October 2013, Carraro stated that "Italian football has fallen significantly in Europe in terms of attendance and club results [since 2006]. Italy once competed with England for the top league, but today we've fallen behind."

Nicknamed poltronissimo for the many positions held in his career, Carraro was referred to by La Stampa as "the man who always lands on his feet" due to his ability to leave scandals and controversies unscathed, and was seen as "omnipresent". Carraro was described by journalist Franco Rossi thusly: "In the whole world, after Fidel Castro, Carraro is the person who has been in power the longest." Carraro said that the poltronissimo nickname did not bother him but that the description of Rossi did, elaborating: "That journalist who said I had more power than Fidel Castro made me laugh. Nonsense: Castro stood up to the US, survived Communism, and went down in history." During his career, he was often accused of conflict of interest, including from the noted jurist Victor Uckmar who said that football had gotten worse under Carraro. Carraro himself later observed: "I don't agree, but I'll stop here: it's not right to talk about those who are no longer with us." In 2025, he also joked, stating: "At 85, I understand those who say, 'Is that guy still alive?'"

As an example of criticism, Carraro was the protagonist of Rome's ska-punk band Banda Bassotti in the 1992 song "Cararo [sic] sindaco" ("Cararo Mayor"), whose lyrics were used to criticize him for the way he handled the city of Rome as mayor and for the possession of several houses donated to what the lyrics referred to as his buoi ("cattle"). (Note: Che bravo sindaco, quanta civiltà. Con i manganelli amministra la città ... Cararo sindaco, non temere, non temere. Noi non vogliamo rubarti da mangiare. Vogliamo una casa per abitare con la luce e l'acqua come ce l'avete voi, cioè come ce l'hanno i segretari tuoi, i guardiaspalle tuoi, i poliziotti tuoi, i tuoi buoi! — Italian refrain What a good mayor, what a civilization. With batons he administers the city ... Mayor Cararo, fear not, fear not. We will not steal food. We want to live in a house with light and water as you have it, that is, as your secretaries, your bodyguards, your policemen, your cattle! — English refrain) Years later, Carraro himself responded about the song and its criticism, stating: "I was mayor thanks to the Craxi–Andreotti–Forlani agreement, so it was logical that they would say all sorts of things about me. But I had the respect of the opposition, both right and left: in 1991, we approved the Rome Capital projects, including the Auditorium and other works later built by Rutelli for the Jubilee of 2000."

== Bibliography ==
=== Articles ===
- "N/A". L'Espresso (in Italian). Vol. 26–30. 1998 – via Google Books.
- ""A Fra', che te serve?"". Il Post (in Italian). 4 December 2014.
- Buccheri, Guglielmo (24 September 2025). "Moggi: 'Calciopoli? Carraro voleva aiutare il Milan. Non ho ucciso nessuno. Punii Maradona: sotto la neve'". La Gazzetta dello Sport (in Italian).
- "Carraro Story". MicroMega (in Italian). Vol. 1–5. Editrice Periodici Culturali. 2006. p. 144 – via Google Books.
- "Affidata a Franco Carraro la presidenza di Impregilo". Italia Oggi (in Italian). No. 53. 4 March 1994. p. 12. Archived from the original on 29 January 2023.
- Amoruso, Alessandro (9 January 2020). "Franco Carraro premiato dal CIO: domani riceverà il collare dell'Ordine olimpico". SportFace (in Italian). Archived from the original on 30 January 2023.
- Arduini, Stefano (24 September 2003). "La commedia del calcio: attore per attore". Vita (in Italian). Archived from the original on 29 January 2023.
- Baldini, Daniele (18 June 2009). "Carraro assolto in Cassazione: 'La Lazio era danneggiata dagli arbitri'". TuttoMercatoWeb (in Italian). Archived from the original on 31 January 2023.
- Baldini, Daniele (7 November 2009). "Calciopoli, Carraro sentenziò: 'Salvate Fiorentina e Lazio dalla B'". Calciomercato.com (in Italian). Archived from the original on 24 January 2023.
- Burke, Jason (30 July 2006). "Paradiso to inferno (part two)". The Observer. Archived from the original on 29 January 2023.
- "Calcio, Carraro: nessun conflitto interessi con Capitalia". La Repubblica (in Italian). 2003. Archived from the original on 29 January 2023.
- "Calciopoli, Roberto Beccantini 'Un altro complotto? No Grazie'". Il Fatto Quotidiano. 10 November 2011. Archived from the original on 3 November 2012.
- Capasso, Stefano (15 April 2010). "Carraro parlava così con Bergamo: 'Non favorite la Juve'". Calcio Blog (in Italian). Archived from the original on 2 December 2022.
- Capuano, Giovanni (17 March 2015). "La memoria ritardata di Carraro: 'Campionato '98 falsato'. Quando era nº1 di Lega..." Panorama (in Italian). Archived from the original on 8 December 2022.
- Caracciolo, Nino (2 November 2017). "Calciopoli, verità clamorosa di Carraro: 'scudetto a tavolino all'Inter e Guido Rossi, dico questo'". Sport Fair (in Italian). Archived from the original on 10 December 2022.
- Caracciolo, Nino (4 September 2025). "Le verità di Carraro: 'Lo Scudetto del 2006 non andava assegnato all'Inter, Ciampi chiese spiegazioni sul Napoli'". Goal.com Italia (in Italian).
- "Carraro: Calciopoli colpa mia ma Juve avrebbe vinto uguale". Sport e Vai (in Italian). 12 December 2020. Archived from the original on 8 December 2022.
- "Carraro istruisce Bergamo prima di Inter-Juve: 'C'è Rodomonti? Mi raccomando, che non aiuti la Juventus'". TuttoMercatoWeb (in Italian). 15 April 2010. Archived from the original on 17 April 2021.
- "Carraro: 'Simpatizzo ancora Milan, ma da quando sono andati via Berlusconi e Galliani...'". La Gazzetta dello Sport (in Italian). 29 March 2020. Archived from the original on 15 June 2021.
- "Celebrati i 50 anni della Scuola dello Sport" (in Italian). Italian Rowing Federation. 6 October 2016.
- Cherchi, Francesco (18 June 2009). "Calciopoli, Carraro assolto per mancanza di prove". TuttoMercatoWeb (in Italian). Archived from the original on 31 January 2023.
- Cimini, Luca (7 August 2020). "Avvocato Chiacchio: 'Nel 2001 l'Inter sarebbe dovuta retrocedere per i passaporti falsi'". Blasting News (in Italian).
- "Cio, Carraro lascia dopo 38 anni mondo olimpico". La Repubblica (in Italian). 2020. Archived from the original on 30 January 2023.
- "Conflitto d'interessi da frugare". La Repubblica (in Italian). 22 January 1999. Archived from the original on 30 January 2023.
- Di Pietrantonio, Luciano (18 December 2019). "30 anni fa: Franco Carraro sindaco di Roma". Abitare a Roma (in Italian). Archived from the original on 29 January 2023.
- Esposito, Elisabetta (4 September 2025). "Carraro: 'Calciopoli nata da un mio errore. Dopo la Corea volevo Vialli ct, poi...'". La Gazzetta dello Sport (in Italian).
- "Ex Juve, Moggi attacca Carraro: 'Ricordi quando Collina e Galliani...'". Calciomercato.com (in Italian). 6 August 2020.
- "Ex pres. Figc Carraro: 'Chiamai Bergamo per non favorire troppo la Juve. Pairetto-Moggi, l'antimafia e le intercettazioni...'". Calciomercato.com (in Italian). 4 August 2020.
- "'Faccio questa scelta nell'interesse del calcio'". La Repubblica (in Italian). 8 May 2006. Archived from the original on 15 December 2022.
- Fantauzzi, Paolo (9 June 2014). "A Franco Carraro, senatore di Forza Italia, 200mila euro per il restauro della villa". L'Espresso (in Italian). Archived from the original on 13 June 2021.
- Fiorito, G. (9 December 2011). "Guido Rossi e Franco Carraro: senti chi parla". Giù le mani dalla Juve (in Italian).
- "Franco Carraro, 50 anni tra sport, imprenditoria e politica". Specchio Economico (in Italian). 31 October 2013.
- "Franco Carraro eletto Presidente del Consiglio Direttivo della Divisione Calcio Paralimpico e Sperimentale. Gravina: 'Raggiungeremo tutti gli obiettivi prefissati'" (in Italian). Italian Football Federation.
- "Franco Carraro rieletto Presidente del Consiglio Direttivo della DCPS" (in Italian). Italian Football Federation. 23 April 2021. Archived from the original on 26 October 2021.
- "Franco Carraro eletto presidente della Figc". La Repubblica (in Italian). 28 December 2001.
- "Franco Carraro svela: 'Calciopoli nata da un mio errore politico'". Sportmediaset (in Italian). 4 September 2025.
- Gaito, Antonio (19 April 2010). "Avv. Chiacchio: 'Nel 2001 l'Inter doveva retrocedere in B'". Calciomercato.com (in Italian).
- Galdi, Maurizio (26 September 2011). "Calciopoli, la telefonata, Moggi cala il suo asso". La Gazzetta dello Sport (in Italian). Archived from the original on 25 January 2023.
- Guerrera, Mario (4 August 2020). "Carraro: Calciopoli minò la credibilità del calcio, chiesi di non favorire troppo la Juve nei casi dubbi'". 100x100 Napoli (in Italian).
- "Intercettazioni, Carraro si dimette 'Mai violato regole, ma ora c'è emergenza'". La Repubblica (in Italian). 8 May 2006. Archived from the original on 15 December 2022.
- "Italian Graffiti / L'uomo che invento' l'atletica". Sport Olimpico (in Italian). 14 July 2022.
- "Italy's football chief resigns". World Soccer. 9 May 2006. Archived from the original on 29 January 2023.
- "Juve-Napoli, Beccantini: 'Sorpreso da durezza rispetto a Calciopoli quando, miracolò Franco Carraro da quattro anni e sei mesi di squalifica e 80mila euro di ammenda con diffida'". Stile Juve (in Italian). 14 November 2020. Archived from the original on 15 December 2022.
- Labate, Tommaso (28 January 2018). "Elezioni, nelle liste di Forza Italia esce Carraro, dentro Incocciati, Lella Golfo e Diaconale". Corriere della Sera (in Italian). Archived from the original on 27 November 2021.
- "L'addio al Pdl (in frantumi), rinasce Forza Italia". Corriere della Sera (in Italian). 16 November 2013. Archived from the original on 5 December 2022.
- "'L'Inter doveva retrocedere', Calciopoli e non solo: l'avvocato Chiacchio confessa un'altra malefatta di Carraro". Tribuna.com. 6 August 2020.
- Manzo, Carlo; Ronzoni, Dario (12 March 2011). "Il calcio pensa a un uomo nuovo: Franco Carraro". Linkiesta (in Italian). Archived from the original on 29 January 2023.
- Mensurati, Marco (26 March 2015). "Moggi: 'Cupola? Una presa in giro. Era Carraro a telefonare'". La Repubblica (in Italian). Archived from the original on 15 December 2022.
- Mensurati, Marco (27 March 2015). "La Cupola del calcio secondo Carraro: 'Lo scudetto del '98 falsato per la Juve'". La Repubblica (in Italian). Archived from the original on 23 January 2023.
- "Moggi, addio al calcio 'Mi hanno ucciso l'anima'". La Repubblica (in Italian). 14 May 2006. Archived from the original on 8 December 2022.
- "Moggi torna su Calciopoli e Carraro: Forse si è redento". Virgilio Sport (in Italian). 17 September 2020.
- Olivaro, Stefano (12 November 2009). "Perché non si parla di Carraro". Indiscreto (in Italian). Archived from the original on 10 December 2022.
- "Pdl, Carraro 'caccia' i consiglieri critici". La Nuova di Venezia e Mestre (in Italian). 4 March 2012. Archived from the original on 30 January 2023.
- Pellizzari, Tommaso (28 July 2007). "Doping «piaga della società»". Corriere della Sera (in Italian). p. 48.
- Pisapia, Luca (22 October 2015). "Franco Carraro verso il ritorno in Figc: per lui Tavecchio ha pronta la presidenza della Commissione Grandi Rischi". Il Fatto Quotidiano (in Italian). Archived from the original on 30 January 2023.
- "Presentazioni liste Pdl, Carraro: 'Io paracadutato? Verrò qui un giorno alla settimana'". BolognaToday (in Italian). 28 January 2013. Archived from the original on 8 December 2022.
- "Rome Mayor Quits as Probe Is Reported". Los Angeles Times. Associated Press. 11 June 1992. Archived from the original on 29 January 2023.
- "Sandulli: «Il campionato era regolare»". Corriere della Sera (in Italian). 28 July 2006.
- "'Salvi perchè la gente vuole così'". TGcom24 (in Italian). 27 July 2006.
- Spadafora, Carmine (14 October 2008). "Calciopoli, Carraro assolto Moggi e gli altri a giudizio". Il Giornale (in Italian). Archived from the original on 15 December 2022.
- Sparre, Kirsten (26 May 2006). "Disgraced Italian soccer president can still work for FIFA". Play the Game. Danish Institute for Sports Studies. Archived from the original on 29 January 2023.
- Spigno, Gregorio (25 September 2025). "Carraro risponde a Moggi: 'Tutti i tribunali mi hanno dato ragione. A lui, invece...'". La Gazzetta dello Sport (in Italian).
- "Un convincente Carraro". Giù le mani dalla Juve (in Italian). 21 December 2020.
- Vanetti, Flavio (24 November 2024). "Franco Carraro: «Dal Coni al Campidoglio la mia vita da poltronissimo. Berlusconi mi chiese il Milan. Ho rifiutato la massoneria»". Corriere della Sera (in Italian). Archived from the original on 14 November 2024.
- Zunnino, Corrado (27 July 2006). "Salvati perché la gente voleva così". La Repubblica (in Italian). Archived from the original on 10 December 2022.

=== Books ===
- Beha, Oliviero; Di Caro, Andrea (30 May 2012). Il calcio alla sbarra (in Italian). Bur. ISBN 978-88-586-2794-5 – via Google Books.
- Bellinazzo, Marco (7 June 2018). La fine del calcio italiano (in Italian). Milan: Feltrinelli Editore. ISBN 978-88-588-3262-2 – via Google Books.
- Bucchioni, Enzo; D'Ascoli, Mario; Moggi, Luciano (October 2007). Un calcio nel cuore (in Italian) (1st ed.). Milan: TEA. ISBN 978-88-502-1411-2 – via Google Books.
- Cambiaghi, Emilio; Dent, Arthur (July 2007). Il processo illecito (PDF) (in Italian) (1st ed.). Stampa Indipendente – via Ju29ro.com, 13 March 2008.
- Doidge, Mark (16 July 2015). "Scandal". Football Italia: Italian Football in an Age of Globalization (illustrated ed.). London: Bloomsbury Academic. ISBN 978-1-4725-1919-1 – via Google Books.
- Giangrande, Antonio (2019). Anno 2019. Lo spettacolo e lo sport. Terza parte (It contains several news articles about Carraro) (in Italian). Antonio Giangrande – via Google Books.
- Il libro marrone dell'accusa (PDF) (It covers the 2009 hearings of the Calciopoli trials in Naples.) (in Italian). Giù le mani dalla Juve. 22 December 2009.
- Grassia, Filippo; Lotito, Gianpiero (2010). Inter. Il calcio siamo noi (in Italian). Milan: Sperling & Kupfer. ISBN 978-88-200-4967-6 – via Google Books.
- Hamil, Sean; Hassan, David, eds. (2013). Who Owns Football?: Models of Football Governance and Management in International Sport. London: Routledge. ISBN 978-1-3179-9636-1. Archived from the original on 30 January 2023 – via Google Books.
- Maida, Enrico (2002). "Carraro, Franco". Enciclopedia dello Sport (in Italian). Archived from the original on 30 January 2023 – via Treccani.
- Moncalvo, Luigi (28 November 2023). Juventus segreta (in Italian). Vallecchi - Firenze. ISBN 978-88-252-0393-6 – via Google Books.
- Mughini, Giampiero (1 February 2008). Juve. Il sogno che continua (in Italian) (1st ed.). Milan: Mondadori. ISBN 978-88-04-57594-8 – via Google Books.
- Mungo, Domenico (19 March 2020). With love. Epifanie. Di Kurt Cobain e di me nella Torino sociale degli anni Novanta (in Italian). Monte San Pietro: Miraggi Edizioni. ISBN 978-88-3386-076-3 – via Google Books.
- Pennacchia, Mario (1999). Il calcio in Italia (in Italian). UTET. ISBN 978-88-02-05351-6 – via Google Books.
- Rossi, Stefano (17 September 2024). Guai ai vinti. L'imperativo del successo nell'epoca del fallimento (in Italian). Gruppo Albatros Il Filo. ISBN 979-12-236-0291-1 – via Google Books.
- Zampini, Massimo (12 December 2023). Juventus. Un'ossessione italiana (in Italian) (1st ed.). Milan: Baldini+Castoldi. ISBN 979-12-5494-086-0 – via Google Books.

=== Calciopoli ===
- Arpino, Felix (5 April 2015). "Il mistero di Calciopoli: le schede svizzere (parte terza)". Il calcio è uguale per tutti (in Italian).
- Arpino, Felix (5 August 2015). "La posizione processuale di Antonio Giraudo (parte prima)". Il calcio è uguale per tutti (in Italian).
- Arpino, Felix (27 February 2016). "Il capo A10: Lecce – Parma". Il calcio è uguale per tutti (in Italian).
- Arpino, Felix (22 September 2016). "La posizione processuale di Salvatore Racalbuto: il capo Z". Il calcio è uguale per tutti (in Italian).
- Arpino, Felix (4 December 2016). "Indagine statistica su Calciopoli". Il calcio è uguale per tutti (in Italian).
- Arpino, Felix (13 October 2017). "Il capo A5: Chievo – Fiorentina". Il calcio è uguale per tutti (in Italian).
- Arpino, Felix (27 November 2017). "Calciopoli: il filone laziale". Il calcio è uguale per tutti (in Italian).
- Arpino, Felix (7 December 2017). "Il capo U: Chievo – Lazio". Il calcio è uguale per tutti (in Italian).
- Arpino, Felix (23 December 2017). "Il capo V: Lazio – Parma". Il calcio è uguale per tutti (in Italian).
- Arpino, Felix (29 January 2018). "Calciopoli: l'imputazione che non c'è". Il calcio è uguale per tutti (in Italian).
- Arpino, Felix (29 May 2018). "Calciopoli: l'illecito sportivo della Juventus". Il calcio è uguale per tutti (in Italian).
- Arpino, Felix (9 March 2019). "La posizione processuale di Paolo Bergamo". Il calcio è uguale per tutti (in Italian).
- Carnevale, Matteo (18 March 2025). "Serie A's Golden Era: A Look Back at Italy's Football Dominance". The Cult of Calcio.
- Corsa, Antonio (12 April 2009). "Calciopoli. 'Non ci interessa l'Inter'". AntonioCorsa.it (in Italian). Archived from the original on 17 September 2024.
- Corsa, Antonio (25 January 2010). "Calciopoli. Franco Baldini e 'il ribaltone'". AntonioCorsa.it (in Italian). Archived from the original on 17 September 2024.
- Corsa, Antonio (31 October 2010). "Calciopoli. Le telefonate del Milan/1 – La nona di ritorno". AntonioCorsa.it (in Italian). Archived from the original on 28 November 2024.
- Corsa, Antonio (28 February 2011). "Calciopoli. Tutti gli uomini di Leonardo Meani". AntonioCorsa.it (in Italian). Archived from the original on 18 June 2024.
- Corsa, Antonio (21 June 2011). "Calciopoli. L'intervento dell'avv. Vitiello (difesa Juventus)". AntonioCorsa.it (in Italian). Archived from the original on 1 March 2024.
- Corsa, Antonio (27 September 2011). "Calciopoli. Con chi parlava Moggi nelle telefonate di rimbalzo?". AntonioCorsa.it (in Italian). Archived from the original on 20 May 2024.
- Corsa, Antonio (19 December 2013). "Cosa resta di Calciopoli". AntonioCorsa.it (in Italian). Archived from the original on 1 March 2024.
- Delaney, Miguel (26 March 2017). "Serie A in the 1990s or Premier League in the 2000s? What was the best league era of all time?". The Independent.
- Fitzpatrick, Peter (8 April 2022). "When Calcio Was King: Italian Football's Golden Age". Last Word on Football.
- Ingram, Sam (20 December 2021). "Calciopoli Scandal: Referee Designators As Desired Pawns". ZicoBall. Archived from the original on 10 December 2022.
- "La Cassazione mette fine a Calciopoli: 'Nessun risultato alterato', ma il calcio italiano riflette ancora". Ciociara Oggi (in Italian). 29 March 2025.
- "Le intercettazioni del 2006". Ju29ro.com (in Italian). 12 March 2008.
- Longhi, Lorenzo; Molinari, Alberto (December 2023). "I dieci giorni che sconvolsero il calcio. Il caso calciopoli nella rappresentazione della stampa". Bibliomanie. Letterature, Storiografie, Semiotiche (in Italian). 56 (4). doi:10.48276/issn.2280-8833.10949. ISSN 2280-8833.
- "MilanPhone/2 – Meani a Martino: Mandamelo ancora Ambrosino". Ju29ro.com (in Italian). 18 November 2010.
- "MilanPhone/3 – Meani-Galliani, l'energico richiamo e Collina". Ju29ro.com (in Italian). 19 November 2010.
- "MilanPhone/5 – Dopo Milan-Juve Galliani chiamò Collina". Ju29ro.com (in Italian). 21 November 2010.
- "MilanPhone/11 – E le minacce di Semeraro all'arbitro? Non allarmante!". Ju29ro.com (in Italian). 12 December 2010.
- "MilanPhone/16 – Meani: Cavasin se rompe lo cacci fuori!". Ju29ro.com (in Italian). 12 January 2011.
- Nannetti, Claudio (8 February 2020). "90 minuti + recupero con Paolo Bergamo – 1° parte – Niente da nascondere". Il calcio è uguale per tutti (in Italian).
- Nannetti, Claudio (15 February 2020). "90 minuti + recupero con Paolo Bergamo – 2° parte – Malato di calcio". Il calcio è uguale per tutti (in Italian).
- "Palazzi: 'Per l'Inter era illecito sportivo'". Corriere dello Sport (in Italian). 4 July 2011. Archived from the original on 5 March 2016.
- Santoro, Luca (29 March 2025). "Calciopoli, la Cassazione dà ragione alla Juventus: niente risarcimento al Bologna. Sui social nuovi attacchi all'Inter". Virgilio Sport (in Italian).
- Toscano, Francesco (4 February 2014). "Auricchio? Ci credo. L'incredibile storia di Calciopoli (parte seconda)". La vita e le opinioni (in Italian).
- Toscano, Francesco (4 April 2014). "Auricchio? Ci credo. L'incredibile storia di Calciopoli (parte quarta)". La vita e le opinioni (in Italian).
- Toscano, Francesco (26 July 2014). "Auricchio? Ci credo. L'incredibile storia di Calciopoli (parte sesta)". La vita e le opinioni (in Italian).
- Toscano, Francesco (27 September 2014). "Auricchio? Ci credo. L'incredibile storia di Calciopoli (parte ottava)". La vita e le opinioni (in Italian).
- Toscano, Francesco (31 January 2015). "Auricchio? Ci credo. L'incredibile storia di Calciopoli (parte dodicesima)". La vita e le opinioni (in Italian).
- Toscano, Francesco (30 June 2015). "Massimo De Santis: il condannato di Calciopoli (2)". Il calcio è uguale per tutti (in Italian).
- Toscano, Francesco (10 September 2015). "Auricchio? Ci credo. L'incredibile storia di Calciopoli (15). La grigliata delle beffe". Il calcio è uguale per tutti (in Italian).
- Toscano, Francesco (11 November 2015). "Trittico Paparesta (3). La competenza territoriale". Il calcio è uguale per tutti (in Italian).
- Toscano, Francesco (26 December 2017). "La Calciopoli di Guido Rossi ovvero: Calciopoli è interista?". Il calcio è uguale per tutti (in Italian).
- Toscano, Francesco (27 July 2018). "Il caso Chievo e il doping amministrativo". Il calcio è uguale per tutti (in Italian).
- Toscano, Francesco (14 August 2018). "Per una storia 'laica' di Calciopoli: Marco Bellinazzo in La fine del calcio italiano". Il calcio è uguale per tutti (in Italian).

=== Profile ===
- "Franco Carraro". World Soccer. 14 March 2005. Archived from the original on 29 January 2023.
- "Franco Carraro" (PDF). Direzione Generale Spettacolo (in Italian). October 2012. pp. 4–6.
- "Franco Carraro" (PDF) (in Italian). Italian National Olympic Committee. 2019.
- "Italian Water Ski and Wakeboarding Federation". Italian National Olympic Committee. 2017. Archived from the original on 2 July 2017.
- "Mr Franco Carraro". Olympics. International Olympic Committee. 2021. Archived from the original on 11 December 2022.
- "IOC Members List". International Olympic Committee. 20 February 2022. Archived from the original on 30 January 2023.
- "Scheda di attività di Franco Carraro – XVII Legislatura". Senato.it (in Italian). Archived from the original on 30 January 2023.

=== Songs ===
- "Banda Bassotti – Cararo Sindaco Lyrics" (in Italian). Genius. 2021.

=== Videos ===
- Moggi, Luciano (17 June 2008). Moggi contro Carraro. L'Eretico (in Italian). Interviewed by Sallusti, Alessandro. Telecupole Piemonte – via YouTube.
- Psi, Carraro e Verdone per Roma (in Italian). Craxi Foundation. Archived from the original on 16 January 2014 – via Archivi Spot Politici.
