= Mario Pennacchia =

Italian sports journalist (1928–2021)

Mario Pennacchia (10 May 1928 – 24 August 2021) was an Italian sports journalist who wrote for Corriere dello Sport, Il Corriere dello Sport, La Gazzetta dello Sport, Il Messaggerò, and Il Giorno.

== Biography ==
A sports journalist and chronicler, Pennacchia collaborated with various newspapers, including Corriere dello Sport, where he authored the column "Forza Ragazzi!" for several years. He also wrote for Il Giorno and La Gazzetta dello Sport, serving as the director of the latter's Rome editorial office. Additionally, he edited the monthly magazine L'Arbitro and contributed to the daily newspaper Il Messaggero.

A former pundit on the television programs Il processo del lunedì (directed by Aldo Biscardi) and La Domenica Sportiva, he published numerous books dedicated to the world of sport and its champions. These include Gli Agnelli e la Juventus (winner of the Premio Bancarella Sport in 1986), Il Calcio in Italia, Lazio Patria Nostra, and Football Force One.

Between the late 1980s and early 1990s, he served as a consultant to the president of the FIGC, Antonio Matarrese. Under the presidency of Sergio Cragnotti, he was the head of communications for S.S. Lazio, the club he supported.

In 2003, he published the book Anche i ragazzi hanno fatto la storia ("Children Have Also Made History"), in which he recounted his personal experiences living between his native Itri and Rome during World War II.

Pennacchia died in Rome at the age of 93 following a cardiac arrest.
