= Lega Pro =

Association football organization in Italy

- Lega Italiana Calcio Professionistico
- Abbreviation: LICP
- Predecessor: Lega IV Serie
- Founded: 1 August 1959; 67 years ago
- Headquarters: Florence
- Region served: Italy
- Products: Serie C Coppa Italia Serie C Campionato Primavera 3
- Members: 60 clubs
- President: Matteo Marani
- Parent organization: FIGC
- Website: www.seriec.com

Lega Italiano Calcio Professionistico (English: Professional Football Italian League), commonly known as Lega Pro (English: Pro League), is the league that runs the third tier of professional association football competitions in Italy, Serie C; the third division of Italian football. It used several names in the past, including Lega Professionisti Serie C. It is a full member of European Leagues.

== History ==
The league was founded on 1 August 1959 as Lega Nazionale Semiprofessionisti by the FIGC Commissioner Bruno Zauli on the base of the old Lega IV Serie. The League managed three Serie C and six Serie D groups with 162 clubs. The league was intermediate between professionals and amateurs. Former C clubs protested for their lost Lega Calcio membership, and they spent the following twenty years to regain a professional status. The league, led by Artemio Franchi, was expanded in 1967 to 222 clubs. A new reform in 1978 abolished the Serie D and divided the C into two fully professional championships, the Serie C1 and the Serie C2, with 108 members in six groups. The new name was Lega Nazionale Serie C, and its status became professional. After 2000 the Serie C2 was reduced and later abolished in 2014, to give way to a Serie C in three groups.
