= Tavecchio =

Tavecchio (pronounced [taˈvɛkkjo]) is an Italian surname from Lombardy. Notable people with the surname include:

- Carlo Tavecchio (1943–2023), Italian politician, sports executive and administrator
- Giorgio Tavecchio (born 1990), Italian player of American football
