= Gianni Petrucci =

Italian sports director (born 1945)

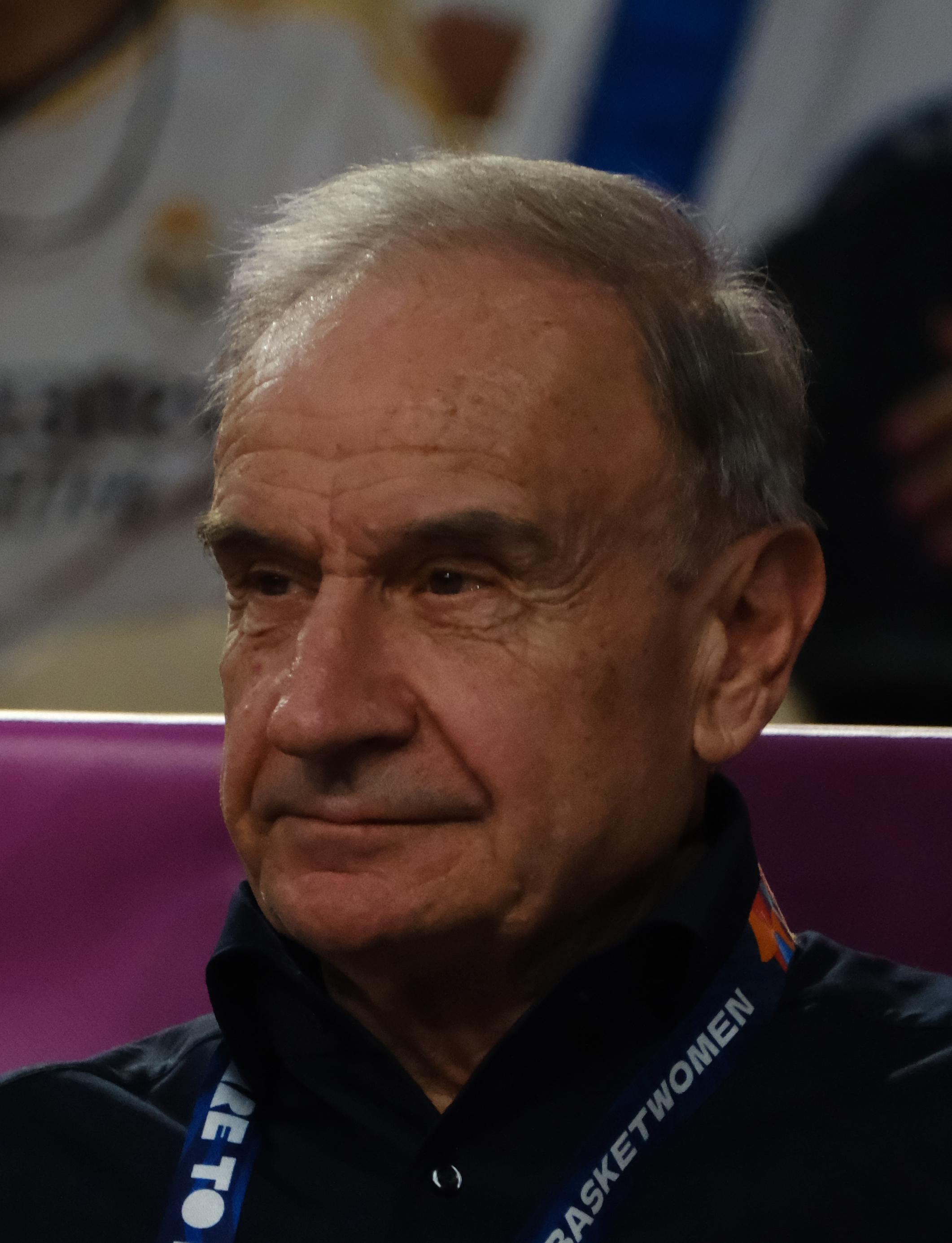
- Petrucci in 2025

President of Italian Basketball Federation
- Incumbent
- Assumed office 12 January 2013
- Preceded by: Dino Meneghin
- In office 14 March 1922 – 27 January 1999
- Preceded by: Enrico Vinci
- Succeeded by: Fausto Maifredi

Mayor of San Felice Circeo
- In office 6 May 2012 – 12 June 2017
- Preceded by: Vincenzo Cerasoli
- Succeeded by: Giuseppe Schiboni

President of FIGC
- In office 9 December 2000 – 31 October 2001
- Preceded by: Luciano Nizzola
- Succeeded by: Franco Carraro

President of CONI
- In office 28 January 1999 – 14 January 2013
- Preceded by: Bruno Grandi
- Succeeded by: Giovanni Malagò

Personal details
- Born: Giovanni Petrucci; 19 July 1945 Rome, Italy
- Occupation: Sport administrator

Giovanni "Gianni" Petrucci (born 19 July 1945) is an Italian sports director. Born in Rome, Petrucci was the president of the Italian National Olympic Committee (CONI) for the fourth consecutive term that ended after the Games of the XXX Olympiad of 2012.

His career took place primarily between the Italian Football Federation (where he was special commissioner of the Italian Referees Association) and the Italian Basketball Federation (of which he was elected president in two consecutive occasions), before becoming on 29 January 1999, President of CONI, succeeding Bruno Grandi in the position in 1999. On 6 May 2009, has been reelected for his fourth consecutive term: he got 55 votes against 24 of the challenger, Franco Chimenti, president of FederGolf.

He was Special Commissioner of the FIGC in 2000–2001. On 6 May 2012, he was elected mayor of San Felice Circeo.
