= Italian Football Federation =

Governing body of association football in Italy

UEFA
- Short name: FIGC
- Founded: 26 March 1898; 128 years ago
- Headquarters: Rome
- FIFA affiliation: 1905
- UEFA affiliation: 15 June 1954; 72 years ago
- President: Giovanni Malagò
- Website: figc.it

The Italian Football Federation (Italian: Federazione Italiana Gioco Calcio, pronounced [federatˈtsjoːne itaˈljaːna ˈdʒwɔːko ˈkaltʃo]; FIGC [fiddʒitˈtʃi]), known colloquially as Federcalcio (pronounced [ˌfederˈkaltʃo]), is the governing body of football in Italy. It is based in Rome and the technical department is in Coverciano, Florence.

It manages and coordinates the Italian football league system. It is also responsible for appointing the management of the Italy national football team (men's), women's, and youth national football teams. The Italy national futsal team also belongs to the federation.

== History ==
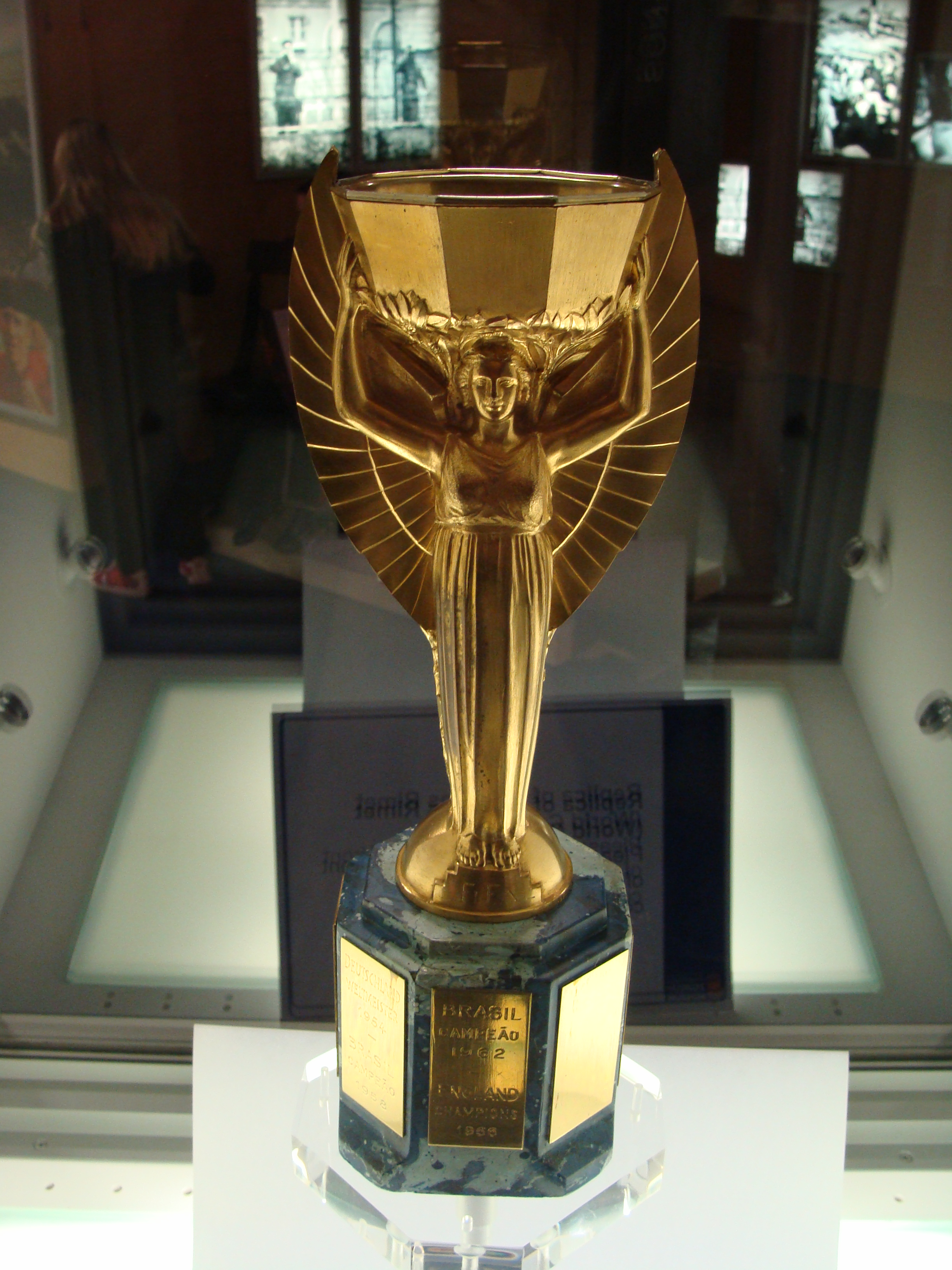
A replica of the Jules Rimet Trophy on display at the National Football Museum in England. The trophy was won by Italy during its back-to-back victories in 1934 FIFA World Cup and 1938 FIFA World Cup. The original was stolen from Brazil in 1983 and has never been recovered.

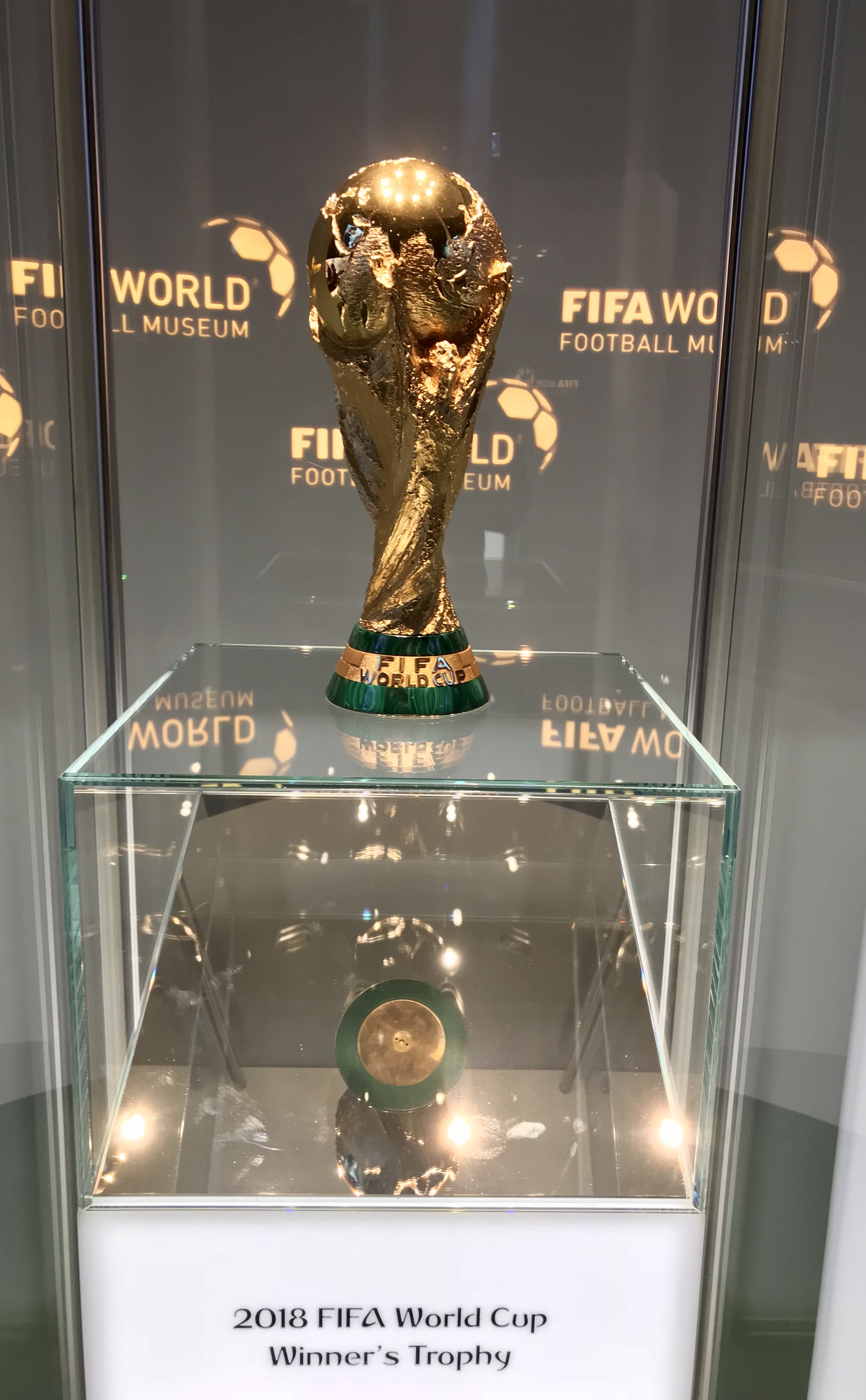
FIFA World Cup Trophy, displayed at the FIFA World Museum, Zurich, Switzerland, on 2 April 2018, won by the Italy in 1982 FIFA World Cup and 2006 FIFA World Cup.

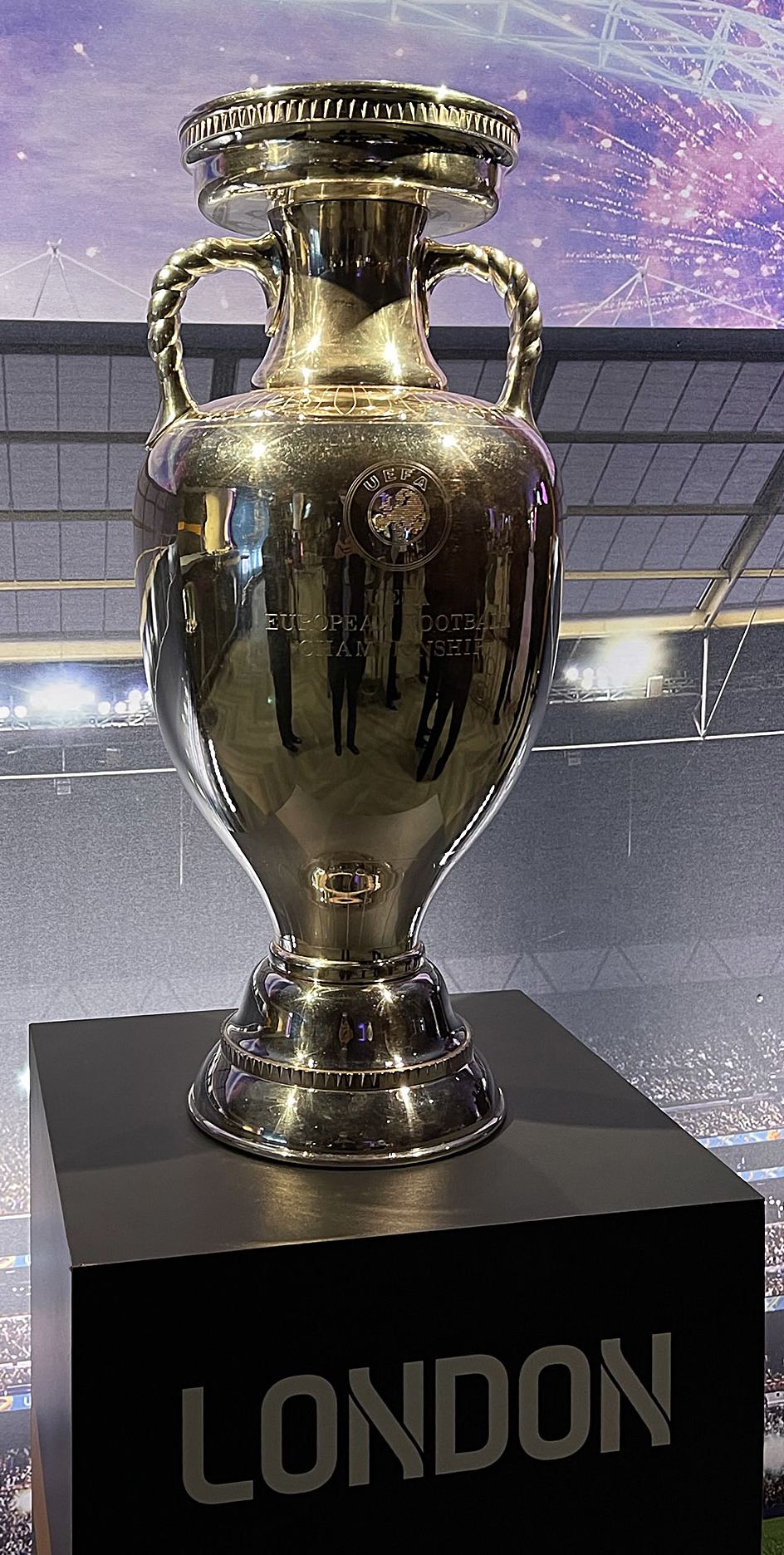
The trophy on display in London, won by Italy at 2020 UEFA Euro in 2021

The Federation was established in Turin on 26 March 1898 as the Federazione Italiana del Football (FIF), on the initiative of a Constituent Assembly established on 15 March by Enrico D'Ovidio. Mario Vicary was elected the first official president of the FIF on 26 March.

When, in 1909, it was suggested that the Federation's name be changed at the annual board elections held in Milan, the few teams attending, representing less than 50% of the active clubs, decided to send a postcard asking all teams to vote for the five new names discussed during the meeting. The new name approved was "Federazione Italiana Giuoco del Calcio" (FIGC), and it has since been the name of the Italian Football Federation. The debut of the Men's National Team was on 15 May 1910, at the Arena Civica, where Italy, wearing a white jersey, defeated France 6–2. The following year, the blue jersey was introduced on the occasion of the match against Hungary as a tribute to the colour of the House of Savoy.

This Italian Federation was an amateur federation respecting FIFA rules when it became a member in 1905. At the end of World War I, the federation had seen impressive development and several footballers were judged to be professional players and banned according to FIFA agreements. From 1922 to 1926, new and more severe rules were approved for keeping the "amateur" status real and effective, such as footballers' residence and transfer controls, but the best players were secretly paid and moved from other provinces illegally. Foreigners had to live in the country to get a residence visa and a players' card. When, in 1926, the Italian Federation Board resigned following a very difficult referees' strike, the fascist Lando Ferretti, president of the Italian Olympic Committee (C.O.N.I.), nominated a Commission to reform all Leagues and federal rules. The Commission signed a document called the Carta di Viareggio (Rules issued in Viareggio), in which football players were recognised as "non-amateurs" and able to apply for refunds for the money they had lost while playing for the football teams. They had to sign a declaration that they were not professional players, so that FIFA rules were respected; for the FIGC, they appeared as "amateurs" receiving just refunds. It was the beginning of professionalism in Italy. The Carta di Viareggio reduced the number of foreign players to just one per match, so the majority of Hungarians remained jobless and returned to their country.

Commissioner Bruno Zauli led the FIGC renovation process (1959), with the establishment of three Leagues (Professional, Semi-professional, Amateur) and the creation of the Technical and Youth Sectors.

Between 1964 and 1980, foreign players were banned from the Italian league, primarily to revive the national team.

In December 1998, the FIGC celebrated its centenary at the Stadio Olimpico in a match featuring Italy vs World XI, with Italy winning 6–2.

The FIGC was placed in administration in May 2006 as a result of the 2006 Italian football scandal and was put under the management of Guido Rossi. In May 2006, Rossi was chosen and accepted the role of president of Telecom Italia. This appointment caused angry reactions from club presidents in Italy. On 19 September, Rossi resigned as Commissioner of FIGC. On 21 September, Luca Pancalli, head of the Italian Paralympic Committee, was chosen to replace Rossi. On 2 April 2007, a new President was elected, with former Vice-President Giancarlo Abete being voted in by 264 grand electors out of 271.

Following the 2014 FIFA World Cup, Abete resigned and Carlo Tavecchio was elected president of the Federation, with Michele Uva as general manager. The new governance began many reforms on the main aspects of Italian football, particularly the use of young players trained in Italy, the economic and financial sustainability of professional clubs, and the reorganization of the operating structure of the FIGC. In support of the activity and with a view to maximum transparency, the FIGC published a series of documents: the Football Report, the Integrated Budget (evolution of the Social Report), the Management Report, and the Income Statement of Italian football. On 20 November 2017, Tavecchio resigned as Italian Football Federation president, seven days after Italy failed to qualify for the 2018 FIFA World Cup, the first time since 1958. The inability to elect a new federal president through elections made it necessary for the Italian Olympic Committee to appoint a special commissioner: the role was entrusted to Roberto Fabbricini.

On 22 October 2018, Gabriele Gravina was elected president with 97.2% of the vote, after the Federation had been led for just over eight months by extraordinary commissioner Roberto Fabbricini. Gravina had resigned as Lega Pro president on 16 October 2018. In the FIGC elections of 22 February 2021, Gabriele Gravina ran again for the presidency of the FIGC against his deputy Cosimo Sibilia, president of the Lega Nazionale Dilettanti (who supported him), with the support of most professional clubs, the Associazione Italiana Allenatori Calcio, and the Associazione Italiana Calciatori, and was re-elected with 73.45% of the vote. On 20 April 2021, Gabriele Gravina was also elected to the UEFA Executive Committee with 53 votes out of 55, becoming the first of eight elected.

During Gravina's presidency, on 11 July 2021, the Italian men's national football team became European champion by winning UEFA Euro 2020. They also finished third at the 2021 UEFA Nations League Finals. These successes were mainly due to the national team coach Roberto Mancini and the head of the delegation, his close friend Gianluca Vialli, and to the technical staff and experienced players Giorgio Chiellini (captain) and Leonardo Bonucci. Under his management, the team was unbeaten from October 2018 to October 2021, and holds the world record for most consecutive matches without defeat (37). It was Spain, in October 2021 during the 2021 UEFA Nations League Finals, that ended Italy's unbeaten run.

Gabriele Gravina's presidency was marked by inaction, failing to implement any reform of the Italian football movement from the grassroots, to the lower categories, and to the development of young Italian talent. No reform occurred; indeed, the presence of low-quality foreign players in the Italian league continued to grow. The success of the European Championship had masked these evident critical issues of the entire Italian football movement. The Federation has shown profound weakness towards FIFA, which has never considered the Italian national team as its FIFA Team of the Year, not even after 37 consecutive victories and the victory at the 2020 European Championship. In 2021, Belgium were rewarded, obtaining only a fourth place in the 2021 UEFA Nations League Finals, beaten by Italy.

The Federation made a successful bid for the 2032 UEFA European Football Championship on 23 March 2022. However, Turkey also joined the bid later, on 4 October 2023, and won; thus both countries were designated as co-hosts. The Italian-Turkish bid was the first joint bid for a European Championship by countries not in close geographic proximity.

On 24 March 2022, Italy lost 1–0 at home to North Macedonia during the semi-finals of the 2022 World Cup qualification play-offs, failing to qualify for the 2022 FIFA World Cup, missing out on the tournament for the second consecutive time in their history. This was a failure attributable partly to the coach Roberto Mancini and the players, and partly to the federation, which chose Stadio Renzo Barbera, Palermo, and not Stadio Olimpico, Rome, as the venue for the match. This underestimation in dealing with North Macedonia would have dire repercussions. Meanwhile, the Federation and the presidency remained immobile and inert on reforms. They focused solely on the national team coach, to whom they attributed sole responsibility. On 1 June 2022, Italy were defeated 3–0 at Wembley Stadium by reigning Copa América champions Argentina in the 2022 Finalissima. Argentina then became world champions at the 2022 FIFA World Cup. Gianluca Vialli died on 5 January 2023. Despite these two serious defeats, Roberto Mancini's Italian national team finished third in the 2023 UEFA Nations League Finals, and Spain defeated Italy again, as they had in the previous edition. Spain went on to win the 2022–23 UEFA Nations League.

On 13 August 2023, Roberto Mancini resigned as national team coach. As his replacement, Luciano Spalletti was appointed as coach of the Italy national team and led the team to qualify for UEFA Euro 2024. On 9 September 2023, Spalletti coached his first match for Italy, a 1–1 away draw in a UEFA Euro 2024 qualifying match against North Macedonia. On 20 November 2023, he secured his first success in the new position by coaching Italy to qualify for UEFA Euro 2024, after holding Ukraine to a goalless draw on neutral ground in Leverkusen; Italy advanced in their place by a superior head-to-head record after finishing second in their group behind England.

In their UEFA Euro 2024 Group B campaign, Italy won 2–1 against Albania, lost 1–0 to Spain on a Calafiori own goal, and drew with Croatia thanks to a last-minute goal in extra time in the 98th minute from Zaccagni. But the enthusiasm for advancing from the group was quickly dashed by a 2–0 defeat to Switzerland on 29 June 2024 in the Round of 16. The national team's performance was embarrassing due to their passive play. Spalletti took "responsibility" for Italy's early exit, commenting: "We failed because of my team selection, it is never down to the players." He also cited the limited time he had to prepare the team as a difficulty after taking over the role from Mancini in August 2023. Sports Minister Andrea Abodi called the Italian national team's participation in UEFA Euro 2024 a failure. Spalletti did not step down from his position following the tournament, and was later confirmed as Italy coach by the chief of the FIGC, Gabriele Gravina. The Federation has continued to be inactive and ineffective in reforming an increasingly declining Italian football movement. Spain won the UEFA Euro 2024 and became the new European champions.

In the 2024–25 UEFA Nations League, Italy earned a direct berth in Group A2, qualifying behind France but tied on 13 points. During qualifying, they secured a surprising 3–1 victory over France on 6 September 2024, at the Parc des Princes in Paris. France, meanwhile, won by the same scoreline, 3–1, at the San Siro in Milan on 17 November 2024. The final scoreline in Group A2 accurately reflected the strength of a team on par with France. However, in the quarter-finals, Italy lost 2–1 in the first leg against Germany and drew 3–3 in the second leg. Germany deservedly advanced to the semi-finals, where they, however, lost to Portugal. The Federation showed no signs of change, only inertia and maintenance of the status quo. In 2025, Gabriele Gravina was re-elected as president of the FIGC with 98.68% of the votes. In the 2026 FIFA World Cup qualification – UEFA Group I, Italy failed to qualify directly from its group after losing 3–0 to Norway on 6 June 2025, at Ullevaal Stadion, Oslo. The defeat inevitably brought consequences.

On 8 June 2025, Spalletti held a press conference to announce that he had been sacked from his role, but would remain in charge of Italy for the 9 June qualifier against Moldova. On 15 June 2025, Gennaro Gattuso, former 2006 World Cup winner and manager, was announced as Italy's coach, replacing Luciano Spalletti, who had been fired following the defeat to Norway but won his final match against Moldova 2–0. Gianluigi Buffon was appointed head of the delegation. Under his guidance, Italy deservedly won all their Group I matches, but also faced some uncertainty, especially in the 5–4 victory against Israel at the neutral venue of Nagyerdei Stadion, Debrecen, in Hungary. However, in their final group match, they faced Norway at the San Siro in Milan and lost 4–1. It was a stinging defeat that sealed their failure to qualify directly for the 2026 FIFA World Cup. Gattuso's Italy showed clear defensive vulnerability against a compact Norway with an extremely fast attack led by Erling Braut Haaland. Italy advanced to the play-offs. On 27 March 2026, Italy defeated Northern Ireland in the semi-final 2–0 to advance to the final. Days later, on 31 March 2026, Italy failed to qualify for the 2026 FIFA World Cup after losing to Bosnia and Herzegovina on penalties following a 1–1 draw, marking the third straight World Cup for which they failed to qualify. Gattuso would later apologize for the defeat. On 2 April 2026, Buffon resigned from his position. The disappointment was profound for all Italians. On 3 April 2026, Gattuso resigned as head coach of the Italy national team.

The failure to qualify for the FIFA World Cup for the third consecutive time has exploded in all its gravity, and this time the federation can no longer live by inertia. The Italian public is demanding radical change within the federation and the Italian football movement. Despite the gravity of the situation, Gabriele Gravina initially showed no signs of resigning. The Minister of Sport Andrea Abodi was ready to place the Federation under special administration, at this point to avoid further embitterment and conflict. Gabriele Gravina took responsibility for the repeated failures, the lack of reforms, and the inertia of his management, and resigned as federal president.

On 10 April, Silvio Baldini was named caretaker manager for Italy's friendlies in June. As a statement on the state of youth development in Italy, he announced that he intended to call up only U21 players for his first matches. The following call-up consisted of a single player above the age of 22, namely goalkeeper Gianluigi Donnarumma.

On 11 April 2026, the Federation intends to submit a bid to host the 2038 FIFA World Cup as soon as the bids for the 2038 edition open. The Federation also plans to modernize stadiums throughout Italy in preparation for the 2032 UEFA European Football Championship.

Italy's failure to qualify for the 2026 FIFA World Cup resulted in an estimated economic loss of between €300 million and €1 billion in earnings and revenue. The damage to its image and reputation following the three failed qualifications is significant, and this has impacted sponsors, who have reconsidered their support and investments. The Italian national team's consecutive failure to qualify for these editions of the FIFA World Cup has resulted in economic damages estimated at €5 billion. Before the start of the 2026 FIFA World Cup, some Italians, particularly Paolo Zampolli, aware that failure to qualify for the 2026 World Cup would have serious economic and reputational repercussions, urged FIFA to consider re-qualifying Italy instead of Iran, with which the United States was at war. However, the initiative was not considered by FIFA, the President of the United States Donald Trump did not support it, and Minister Andrea Abodi deemed it inappropriate and undeserved, and likely to further increase reputational damage. However, this further disappointed those Italians who had supported the initiative. Furthermore, during the 2026 FIFA World Cup held in North America, FIFA President Gianni Infantino, a Swiss of Italian origin, mocked the Italy national football team and the Federation for their failure to qualify, provoking indignation, frustration, and anger among the Italian public. So much so that the Federation intervened to demand respect, and the Minister of Sport, Andrea Abodi, had to intervene, asking people to refrain from making jokes about a situation that was causing strong discontent among the Italian public.

On 22 June 2026, Giovanni Malagò was elected the new president of the Federation.

== Honours ==
=== National teams ===
==== Men ====
- FIFA World Cup

- Winner (4): 1934, 1938, 1982, 2006
- Runner-up (2): 1970, 1994
- Third place (1): 1990
- Fourth place (1): 1978

- UEFA European Championship

- Winner (2): 1968, 2020
- Runner-up (2): 2000, 2012
- Semi-finals (1): 1988
- Fourth place (1): 1980

- UEFA Nations League

- Third place (2): 2020–21, 2022–23

- FIFA Confederations Cup

- Third place (1): 2013

- Finalissima

- Runner-up (1): 2022

- Olympic football tournament

- (gold) Gold Medal (1): 1936
- (bronze) Bronze Medal (2): 1928, 2004

- Central European International Cup

- Winner (2): 1927–30, 1933–35
- Runner-up (2): 1931–32, 1936–38 (Note: This edition of the tournament was interrupted due to the annexation of Austria to Germany on 12 March 1938.)

=== Awards ===
- FIFA Team of the Year

- Runner-up (2): 1993, 2006
- Third place (2): 1995, 2007

- Laureus World Sports Award for Team of the Year

- Winner (2): 2007, 2022

- World Soccer Team of the Year

- Winner (1): 2021

- Gazzetta Sports World Team of the Year

- Winner (2): 1982, 2006

==== Women ====
- FIFA Women's World Cup

- Quarter-finals (2): 1991, 2019
- Group stage (2): 1999, 2023

- UEFA Women's Championship

- Runner-up (2): 1993, 1997
- Semi-finals (1): 1984, 2025
- Third place (1): 1987
- Fourth place (2): 1989, 1991

- UEFA Women's Nations League

- Seventh place (2): 2023, 2025

=== National youth teams ===
==== Men ====
- FIFA U-20 World Cup

- Runner-up (1): 2023
- Third place (1): 2017
- Fourth place (1): 2019

- FIFA U-17 World Cup

- Third place (1): 2025
- Fourth place (1): 1987

- UEFA European Under-21 Championship

- Winner (5): 1992, 1994, 1996, 2000, 2004
- Runner-up (2): 1986, 2013

- UEFA European Under-19 Championship (U-19 since 2002)

- Winner (4): 1958, 1966, 2003, 2023
- Runner-up (7): 1959, 1986, 1995, 1999, 2008, 2016, 2018

- UEFA European Under-17 Championship (U-17 since 2002)

- Winner (3): 1982, 2024, 2026
- Runner-up (6): 1986, 1993, 1998, 2013, 2018, 2019

- Mediterranean Games
  - (gold) Gold medal (4): 1959, 1963, 1967, 1997
  - (silver) Silver medal (4): 2001, 2009, 2018, 2022
  - Fourth place (1): 1993

==== Women ====
- FIFA U-20 Women's World Cup

- Group stage (2): 2004, 2012

- FIFA U-17 Women's World Cup

- Third place (1): 2014
- Quarter-finals (1): 2025

- UEFA Women's Under-19 Championship

- Winner (1): 2008
- Third place (1): 1999
- Semi-finals (3): 2004, 2011, 2025

- UEFA Women's Under-17 Championship

- Third place (1): 2014
- Semi-finals (1): 2025

=== National futsal team ===
==== Men ====
- FIFA Futsal World Cup

- Runner-up (1): 2004
- Third place (2): 2008, 2012

- UEFA Futsal Championship

- Winner (2): 2003, 2014
- Runner-up (1): 2007
- Third place (3): 1999, 2005, 2012
- Fourth place (2): 1996, 2001

==== Women ====
- FIFA Futsal Women's World Cup

- Quarter-finals (1): 2025

- UEFA Women's Futsal Championship

- Group stage (3): 2019, 2022, 2023

== List of presidents ==
No.	Name	Tenure
1	Mario Vicarj	1898–1905
2	Giovanni Silvestri	1905–1907
3	Emilio Balbiano di Belgioioso	1907–1909
4	Luigi Bosisio	1909–1910
5	Felice Radice	1910–1911
6	Emilio Valvassori	1911
7	Alfonso Ferrero de Gubernatis Ventimiglia	1911–1912
8	Vittorio Rignon	1912–1913
9	Luigi De Rossi	1913–1914
10	Carlo Montù	1914–1915
11	Francesco Mauro	1915–1919
12	Carlo Montù	1919–1920
13	Francesco Mauro	1920
14	Luigi Bozino	1920–1921
15	Giovanni Lombardi	1922–1923
16	Luigi Bozino	1923–1924
	Directory	1924
17	Luigi Bozino	1924–1926
18	Leandro Arpinati	1926–1933
19	Giorgio Vaccaro	1933–1942
20	Luigi Ridolfi Vay da Verrazzano	1942–1943
20	Giovanni Mauro (Provisional administrator)	1943
	Directory	1943–1944
21	Fulvio Bernardini	1944
23	Ottorino Barassi	1944–1958
24	Bruno Zauli (Provisional administrator)	1958–1959
25	Umberto Agnelli	1959–1961
26	Giuseppe Pasquale	1961–1967
27	Artemio Franchi	1967–1976
28	Franco Carraro	1976–1978
29	Artemio Franchi	1978–1980
30	Federico Sordillo	1980–1986
31	Franco Carraro (Provisional administrator)	1986–1987
32	Antonio Matarrese	1987–1996
33	Raffaele Pagnozzi (Provisional administrator)	1996–1997
34	Luciano Nizzola	1997–2000
35	Gianni Petrucci (Provisional administrator)	2000–2001
36	Franco Carraro	2001–2006
37	Guido Rossi (Provisional administrator)	2006
38	Luca Pancalli (Provisional administrator)	2006–2007
39	Giancarlo Abete	2007–2014
40	Carlo Tavecchio	2014–2018
41	Roberto Fabbricini (Provisional administrator)	2018
42	Gabriele Gravina	2018–2026
43	Giovanni Malagò	2026
44	Giovanni Malagò (Provisional administrator)	2026–
