= Giancarlo Abete =

Italian politician and sport director

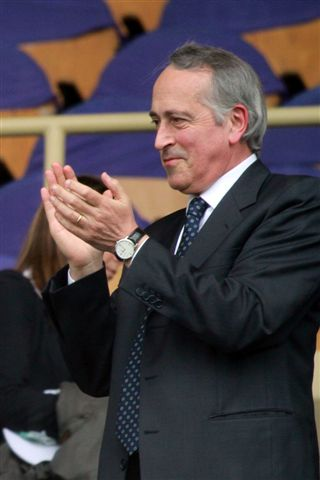

President of Lega Nazionale Dilettanti
- In office 16 November 2021 – 20 March 2022

Chairman of Lega Serie A
- In office 18 December 2019 – 8 January 2020
- Preceded by: Mario Cicala
- Succeeded by: Paolo Dal Pino

Third Vice President of UEFA
- Incumbent
- Assumed office 22 March 2011

President of FIGC
- In office 2 April 2007 – 11 August 2014
- Preceded by: Luca Pancalli
- Succeeded by: Carlo Tavecchio

Chamber of Deputies
- In office 20 June 1979 – 22 April 1992

Personal details
- Born: 26 August 1950 (age 76) Rome, Italy
- Party: Christian Democracy
- Occupation: Football administrator

Giancarlo Abete (born 26 August 1950) is an Italian politician and sport director. Formerly a member of the Italian parliament, Abete is now the third vice president of UEFA. Abete also served positions in the FIGC before being admitted to UEFA in 2009.

== Early life ==
Abete was born in Rome, Italy. As entrepreneur, he went to Sapienza University of Rome and earned a degree in Economics and Commerce.

== Career ==
=== In politics ===
He sat in the Italian Parliament from 1979 to 1992 among the ranks of Christian Democracy. He stayed there for 20 years before deciding to go elsewhere in 1992. In 1994, Abete was elected as the president of the Rome entrepreneurs association which he served as until 2000. Abete served as the head of Rome's tourist board from 1999 to 2003.

=== In football ===
Abete first became involved in the FIGC in 1989. He later became president of the Serie C and the association's vice president from 1996 to 2000 and again from 2001 to 2006. He was head of the Italian delegation when Italy won the 2006 FIFA World Cup. Abete was elected president of the FIGC in April 2007. In 2009, Abete was admitted to UEFA in 2009 and became a vice president in 2011. Abete stepped down from his position of president of the FIGC in 2014, but he still continues to be a vice president of UEFA.
