= Bruno Zauli =

Italian sports official

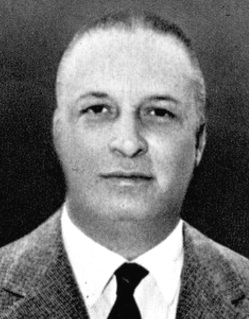

President of FIDAL
- In office 1946–1957
- Preceded by: Angelo Vigani
- Succeeded by: Luigi Ridolfi Vay da Verrazzano

Personal details
- Born: 18 December 1902 Ancona, Italy
- Died: 7 December 1963 (aged 60) Grosseto, Italy

Bruno Zauli (18 December 1902 – 7 December 1963) was an Italian sports official, best known as president of the Italian Athletics Federation from 1946 to 1957.

Bruno Zauli was the ideator of the European Cup (athletics).

== See also ==
- Italian Athletics Federation
- European Cup (athletics)
