= Carlo Tavecchio =

Italian politician, sports executive, and administrator (1943–2023)

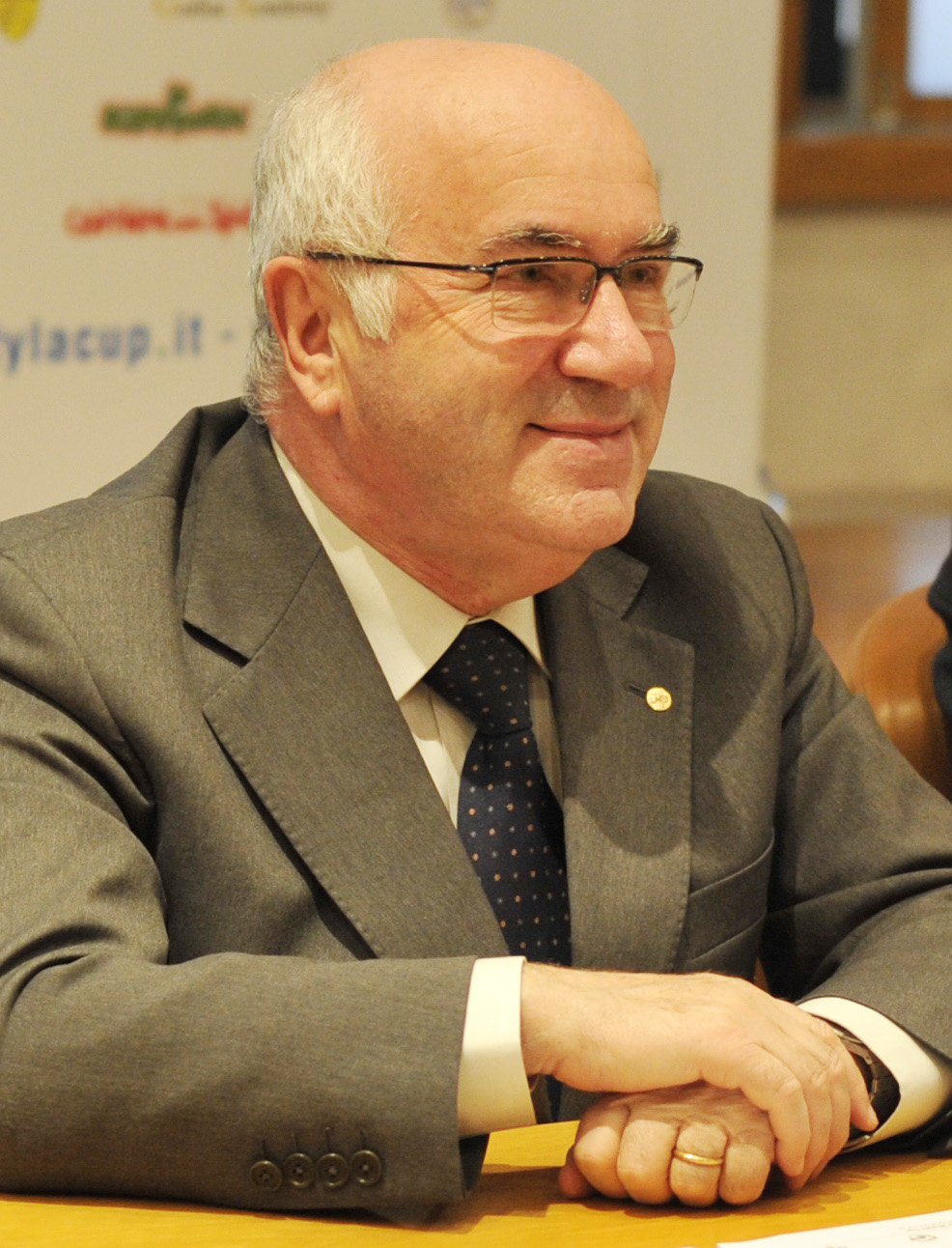
- Tavecchio in 2010

Chairman of Lega Serie A
- In office 21 April 2017 – 29 January 2018
- Preceded by: Maurizio Beretta
- Succeeded by: Giovanni Malagò

President of FIGC
- In office 11 August 2014 – 29 January 2018
- Preceded by: Giancarlo Abete
- Succeeded by: Roberto Fabbricini

President of Lega Nazionale Dilettanti
- In office 29 May 1999 – 11 August 2014
- Preceded by: Elio Giulivi
- Succeeded by: Felice Belloli

Mayor of Ponte Lambro
- In office 1976–1995
- Preceded by: Pierluigi Maggi
- Succeeded by: Romano Paiella

Personal details
- Born: 13 July 1943 Ponte Lambro, Lombardy, Kingdom of Italy
- Died: 28 January 2023 (aged 79) Erba, Lombardy, Italy
- Occupation: Football administrator

Carlo Tavecchio (Italian pronunciation: [ˈkarlo taˈvɛkkjo]; 13 July 1943 – 28 January 2023) was an Italian politician, sports executive, and administrator.

== Career ==
For four legislatures, he held the office of Mayor of Ponte Lambro. For 15 years, he was president of an amateur company. From 1987 to 1992, he was Director of the Regional Committee of Lombardy. From 1992 to 1996, he was Vice President of the Lega Nazionale Dilettanti. Since 1996, he was Chairman of the Regional Committee of Lombardy. From 1999 to 2014, he held the position of President of the Lega Nazionale Dilettanti.

On 11 August 2014, Tavecchio was appointed president of the Italian Football Federation. On 6 March 2017, Tavecchio was re elected as president of the Italian Football Federation for a second term.

On 21 April 2017, Tavecchio was nominated commissioner of the Lega Serie A.

On 20 November 2017, Tavecchio resigned as Italian Football Federation president, seven days after Italy failed to qualify for the 2018 FIFA World Cup, the first time they failed to qualify for the World Cup since 1958.

== Personal life and death ==
Tavecchio was married with a daughter. He died on 28 January 2023, at the age of 79.

== Controversies ==
On 7 October 2014, Tavecchio received a six-month ban by UEFA for when he stereotyped African footballers in Italy with a fictional character named "Opti Poba". He was also barred from the UEFA Congress of March 2015.

"England identifies the subjects coming in if they have the professionalism to get them to play, but we say that Opti Poba came here, that before he ate bananas, now has a starting role at Lazio and that's okay. In England, he must demonstrate its curriculum and its pedigree [...]"

On 1 November 2015, an audio tape of Tavecchio became public in which he disparaged Jews and homosexuals.

== Criminal record ==
Tavecchio was tried and convicted five times since 1970.

- In 1970, he was sentenced to four months for forgery of credit title
- In 1994, he was sentenced to twenty eight months two days for tax evasion and value-added tax
- In 1996, he was sentenced to three months for failure to pay social security deductions and insurance
- In 1998, he was sentenced to three months for omission or falsification of reports
- In 1998, he was sentenced to three months for abuse of office for violation of anti-pollution regulations
