= Antonio Matarrese =

Italian sports manager for football (born 1940)

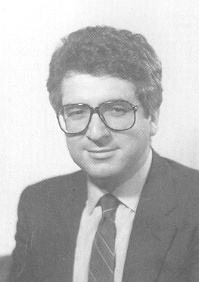
Matarrese in the 1980s

Antonio Matarrese (born 4 July 1940) is an Italian sports manager for football. He is known for having owned A.S. Bari for almost 20 years.

== Family ==
His brothers also worked in notable positions. Giuseppe Matarrese, was the Bishop of Frascati from 1989 to 2009. Vincenzo Matarrese, was president of A.S. Bari, succeeding Antonio Matarrese, from 1983 to 2011, and Michele Matarrese also ran S. Matarrese Plc Group.

== Career ==
Matarrese graduated with a degree in business administration and he is Certified Public Accountant. He is CEO of the S. Matarrese Plc Group. During his career in sport field he has held a number of positions that include:

- President of the Italian Football League from March 1982 to October 1987
- President of the Italian Football Federation from 1987 to 1996
- Member of the Organising Committee of the 1990 FIFA World Cup
- UEFA Vice President from 1992 to 2002
- FIFA Vice President from 1994 to 2002
- President of the Organising Committee for the 1997 Mediterranean Games
- Deputy Vice President of the Italian Football League during the presidency of Adriano Galliani from 2002 to 2004
- President of the TV-platform Gioco Calcio until January 2004
- President of UNIRE (National Horse Breeding Union) from September 2004 to May 2005

On 8 August 2006, he was elected President of the Italian Football League succeeding resigning president Adriano Galliani.

In May 2019, Matarrese was inducted into the Italian Football Hall of Fame for the 2018 edition of the ceremony under the category of football administrator.
