= Elections in Rome =

Italian election

All Rome residents who are at least 18 years old and hold an EU citizenship are eligible to vote for the Mayor and the 48 members of the Capitoline Assembly, as well as for the President and the 30 or 40 members of the Council of the Municipality where they reside.

Since 1993 Italian mayors are elected directly. In all the cities with a population higher than 15,000 the voters express a choice for a mayor-candidate and/or for a party or civic list, not necessarily linked to the same mayor-candidate (voto disgiunto). If no mayor-candidate receives an absolute majority, the top two candidates go to a runoff election (ballottaggio) after two weeks. The City Council and Municipalities Councils elections are based on a proportional system with preferences: for each list, the candidates with the most preferences are elected proportionally to the seats assigned to the list, with the lists supporting the elected mayor being granted around 60% of the total seats to guarantee governability.

Elections are scheduled every five years, usually between 15 April and 15 June. The last election was held in October 2021.

== Elections during the Italian Republic (since 1946) ==
=== City Council election, 1946 ===
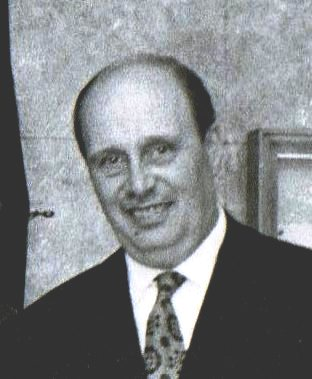
Salvatore Rebecchini, the first democratic Mayor (1946–1956)

The first democratic election after the fall of fascism took place on 10 November 1946.

After the Liberation of Rome on 4 June 1944, Independent nobleman Filippo Andrea VI Doria Pamphili had been appointed as Provisional Mayor by the National Liberation Committee under approval of the United Nations military government. When the authority of the Italian government was restored in 1946, local elections in the whole country were called.

Proportional representation and Westminster system were the principles chosen to restore municipal democracy in Italy.

No clear winner emerged from the election and no force was able to achieve the 41 seats needed for an overall majority. The unitary left-wing list formed by socialists and communists won the largest number of votes and seats but still fell 11 seats short from an absolute majority. The right-wing populist movement Common Man's Front, founded in February that year by the comedian Guglielmo Giannini, performed well and came second, surpassing for just a few votes the catholic Christian Democracy.

Coalition talks began immediately but the reaction of a stable alliance failed. On 10 December 1946 the City Council elected Salvatore Rebecchini (DC) as new Mayor of Rome, but after two weeks he resigned due to the impossibility to form a stable executive board, paving the way for a snap election.

Parties		Votes	%	Seats
Bloc of the People (Italian Socialist Party–Italian Communist Party)	PSI-PCI	190,183	36.2	30
Common Man's Front	FUQ	106,872	20.7	17
Christian Democracy	DC	104,633	20.3	17
Italian Republican Party	PRI	40,444	7.8	6
National Monarchist Party	PNM	36,148	7.0	5
Italian Liberal Party	PLI	25,911	5.0	4
Independents		12,369	2.4	1
Total		516,560	100.0	80

Sunday 10 November 1946. Sources: La Stampa , 1946–1955 Local Elections (Italian)

=== City Council election, 1947 ===
The snap election took place on 12 October 1947.

As for the previous municipal election, no clear winner emerged from the competition. The left-wing Bloc of the People list gained again the most seats. Differently from the 1946 election, the Common Man's Front did poorly and lost more than half of its votes, while Christian Democracy enforced its position making a net gain of 10 seats with more than 32% of votes.

As a result of the election, on 5 November 1947 the City Council re-elected Salvatore Rebecchini (DC) as Mayor. Rebecchini obtained 41 votes out of 80 and his election was made possible thanks to the support of the neo-fascist Italian Social Movement. He formed a centre-right municipal executive board composed by DC, FUQ and PLI.

Parties		Votes	%	+/-	Seats	+/-
Bloc of the People (Italian Socialist Party–Italian Communist Party)	PSI-PCI	208,566	33.4	▼3.4	28	▼2
Christian Democracy	DC	204,247	32.7	▲12.4	27	▲10
Common Man's Front	FUQ	63,462	10.2	▼10.5	8	▼9
Italian Republican Party	PRI	36,701	5.9	▼1.9	5	▼1
National Monarchist Party	PNM	32,691	5.2	▼1.8	4	▼1
Italian Social Movement	MSI	24,620	3.9	▲3.9	3	▲3
Socialist Party of Italian Workers	PSLI	24,967	4.0	▲4.0	3	▲3
Italian Liberal Party	PLI	11,683	1.9	▼3.1	1	▼3
Independents		16,223	2.6	▲0.2	1	Steady
Total		623,574	100.0		80	

Sunday 12 October 1947. Sources: La Stampa , 1946–1955 Local Elections (Italian)

=== City Council election, 1952 ===
The election took place on 25 May 1952.

National political situation had deeply changed during the previous five years. In 1951 Alcide De Gasperi's government changed the local electoral law to a block voting system, to ensure the leadership of its local administrations: two thirds of the seats would be ensured to the winning coalition, abolishing the proportional representation.

The election saw a considerable and unprecedented intervention from the Vatican to secretly influence the electoral outcome. Pope Pius XII was rather distrustful of De Gasperi and Christian Democracy, considering the party indecisive and fractious – reformist currents within it particularly, which tended to the moderate left. On the eve of the municipal election, in which again the Communist and Socialist parties threatened to win out, he used informal connections to make his views known. The pope stated that the war against communism was a holy war and excommunicated members of the Italian Communist Party. Having decided to encourage the Christian democrats to consider a political alliance with the right-wing parties as part of an anti-communist coalition, he asked the Jesuit Father Riccardo Lombardi to speak with De Gasperi and convince him to consider such an alliance – an electoral alliance with those even of monarchist and neo-fascist tendencies –including the neo-fascist Italian Social Movement. Adopting a domino theory he warned that, if "the Communists win in Rome, in Italy, it will cast a shadow on the entire world: France would become Communist, and then Spain and then all of Europe". De Gasperi instead rejected the idea as politically dangerous to the long term fortunes of his party and sustained a centrist electoral alliance.

In the election the centrist coalition obtained an absolute majority. The incumbent Mayor Salvatore Rebecchini was re-elected at the head of an executive formed by DC, PSDI, PRI and PLI.

Coalitions and parties	Votes	%	+/-	Seats	+/-	Seats by party — Seats by coalition
Centrist Coalition	374,998	40.9		53		Seats by party — Seats by coalition
Christian Democracy	285,036	31.1	▼1.6	39	▲9	Seats by party — Seats by coalition
Italian Liberal Party	39,879	4.3	▲2.4	6	▲5	Seats by party — Seats by coalition
Italian Democratic Socialist Party	29,895	3.3	▼0.7	4	▲1	Seats by party — Seats by coalition
Italian Republican Party	20,688	2.2	▼3.7	4	▼1	Seats by party — Seats by coalition
Leftist Coalition	314,045	34.3		16		Seats by party — Seats by coalition
List of the City (Italian Socialist Party–Italian Communist Party)	306,803	33.5	▲0.1	16	▼12	Seats by party — Seats by coalition
Lighthouse List (Leftist Independents)	5,624	0.6	▲0.6	0	Steady	Seats by party — Seats by coalition
Labour	1,618	0.2	▲0.2	0	Steady	Seats by party — Seats by coalition
Italian Social Movement	142,825	15.6	▲11.7	8	▲5	Seats by party — Seats by coalition
Monarchist National Party	53,842	5.9	▲0.7	3	▼1	Seats by party — Seats by coalition
Independents	18,987	2.1	▼0.5	0	▼1	Seats by party — Seats by coalition
Total	910,657	100.0		80		Seats by party — Seats by coalition

Sunday 25 May 1952. Sources: La Stampa , 1946–1955 Local Elections (Italian)

=== City Council election, 1956 ===
The election took place on 27 May 1956.

Again the electoral system for local elections had been changed: after Alcide De Gasperi's government had retired in 1953 the 1951-electoral law based on a block voting system, the previous electoral system based on a proportional representation was restored. This election was anticipated by the effect of a new disposition which ordered a new 4 years-term legislature.

For the first time communists and socialists run separately, undermining their possibilities to won the plurality of votes, as it happened in the previous municipal elections. The centrist coalition was confirmed again as the strongest political alliance in the City Council, despite the electoral campaign had been deeply influenced by the scandal of the building speculation denounced by the prominent magazine L'espresso.

On 2 July 1956 Umberto Tupini (DC) was elected Mayor at the head of a centrist executive composed by DC, PLI and PSDI.

Parties		Votes	%	+/-	Seats	+/-
Christian Democracy	DC	323,881	32.1	▲1.0	27	Steady
Italian Communist Party	PCI	244,082	24.2		20	
Italian Social Movement	MSI	122,185	12.3	▼3.3	10	▲2
Italian Socialist Party	PSI	108,809	10.6		9	
National Monarchist Party	PNM	56,421	5.6	▼0.3	4	▼1
Italian Democratic Socialist Party	PSDI	45,805	4.5	▲1.2	3	▼1
Italian Liberal Party	PLI	42,735	4.2	▼0.1	3	▼3
People's Monarchist Party	PMP	32,691	3.2	▲3.2	2	▲2
Italian Republican Party	PRI	16,436	1.6	▼0.6	1	▼3
Radical Party	PR	12,259	1.2	▲1.2	1	▲1
Independents		6,172	0.6	▼2.0	0	Steady
Total		1,011,123	100.0		80	

Sunday 27 May 1956. Source: La Stampa

=== City Council election, 1960 ===
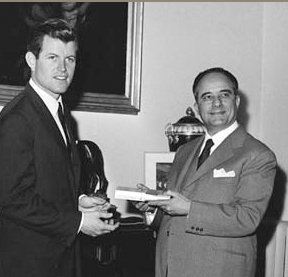
Ted Kennedy (left) and Urbano Ciocchetti (right), who served as Mayor during the 1960 Summer Olympics

The election took place on 6 November 1960.

The centrist coalition which had run the local administration during the 1960 Summer Olympics was confirmed again as the strongest political alliance in the City Council.

The incumbent mayor Urbano Ciocchetti (DC), who succeeded Tupini in 1958, was re-elected at the head of a minority centre-right executive formed by DC and PLI with the external support of PSDI and PRI. However, in July 1961 Ciocchetti resigned due to a political crisis, paving the way for another snap election.

Parties		Votes	%	+/-	Seats	+/-
Christian Democracy	DC	397,069	33.9	▲1.8	28	▲1
Italian Communist Party	PCI	269,838	23.0	▼1.2	19	▼1
Italian Social Movement	MSI	177,932	15.2	▲2.9	12	▲2
Italian Socialist Party	PSI	153,928	13.1	▲2.5	11	▲2
Italian Democratic Socialist Party	PSDI	55,680	4.8	▲0.3	3	Steady
Italian Liberal Party	PLI	47,775	4.1	▼0.1	3	Steady
Italian Democratic Party of Monarchist Unity	PDIUM	31,663	2.7	▲2.7	2	▲2
Italian Republican Party	PRI	17,741	1.5	▼0.1	1	Steady
People's Monarchist Party	PMP	15,420	1.3	▼1.9	1	▼1
Independents		3,395	0.3	▼0.4	0	Steady
Total		1,170,441	100.0		80	

Sunday 6 November 1960. Source: La Stampa

=== City Council election, 1962 ===
The snap election took place on 10 June 1962.

After one year of commissarial tenure resulted from the deep political crisis of the centrist coalition, the election led to the formation of the first centre-left executive in the history of the city, formed by DC, PSDI, PRI and PSI.

On 17 July 1962 Glauco Della Porta (DC) was elected Mayor by the City Council with 40 votes out of 80.

Parties		Votes	%	+/-	Seats	+/-
Christian Democracy	DC	365,940	29.2	▼4.7	24	▼4
Italian Communist Party	PCI	285,771	22.8	▼0.2	19	Steady
Italian Social Movement	MSI	198,248	15.8	▲0.6	13	▲1
Italian Socialist Party	PSI	158,199	12.6	▼0.5	10	▼1
Italian Liberal Party	PLI	103,606	8.3	▲4.2	6	▲3
Italian Democratic Socialist Party	PSDI	78,496	6.3	▲1.5	5	▲2
Italian Democratic Party of Monarchist Unity	PDIUM	35,498	2.8	▲0.1	2	Steady
Italian Republican Party	PRI	16,943	1.3	▼0.2	1	Steady
Radical Party	PR	1,608	0.1	▲0.1	0	Steady
Independents		8,413	0.7	▲0.5	0	Steady
Total		1,252,722	100.0		80	

Sunday 10 June 1962. Source: La Stampa

=== City Council election, 1966 ===
The election took place on 12 June 1966.

Despite considerable losses for the Italian Socialist Party, the centre-left coalition in its complex won the majority of seats in the City Council (41 out of 80). However the election saw the incredible surge of the centre-right Italian Liberal Party, which obtained more than 10% of votes and managed to become for the first time the third party in a Roman municipal election. This exceptional growth of the liberals – and the contemporary defeat of the Italian Socialist Party – can be explained by the poor economic results of the first centre-left national government and by the ability of the liberal leader Giovanni Malagodi to draw some votes from the Italian Social Movement and the Monarchist Party, whose electoral base was composed also by conservatives suspicious of the socialists.

Parties		Votes	%	+/-	Seats	+/-
Christian Democracy	DC	437,138	30.8	▲1.6	26	▲2
Italian Communist Party	PCI	359,454	25.3	▲2.5	21	▲2
Italian Liberal Party	PLI	151,829	10.7	▲2.4	9	▲3
Italian Democratic Socialist Party	PSDI	136,164	9.6	▲3.3	8	▲3
Italian Social Movement	MSI	131,971	9.3	▼6.5	7	▼6
Italian Socialist Party	PSI	108,239	7.6	▼5.0	6	▼4
Italian Democratic Party of Monarchist Unity	PDIUM	32,838	2.3	▼0.5	1	▼1
Italian Socialist Party of Proletarian Unity	PSIUP	29,637	2.1	▲2.1	1	▲1
Italian Republican Party	PRI	24,301	1.7	▲0.4	1	Steady
Independents		8,956	0.6	▼0.1	0	Steady
Total		1,420,507	100.0		80	

Sunday 12 June 1966. Source: La Stampa

=== City Council election, 1971 ===
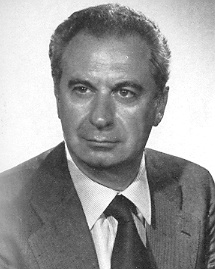
Clelio Darida served as Mayor for nearly seven years (1969–1976)

The election took place on 13 June 1971.

The centre-left coalition obtained again the majority of seats in the City Council. However the incumbent Mayor Clelio Darida (DC) decided to dismiss the alliance and form a minority executive composed only by members of the Christian Democracy with the external support of minor parties.

Parties		Votes	%	+/-	Seats	+/-
Christian Democracy	DC	449,286	28.3	▼2.5	24	▼2
Italian Communist Party	PCI	403,119	25.4	▲0.1	21	Steady
Italian Social Movement	MSI	257,481	16.2	▲6.9	13	▲6
Italian Democratic Socialist Party	PSDI	165,823	10.4	▲0.8	8	Steady
Italian Socialist Party	PSI	131,758	8.3	▲0.7	7	▲1
Italian Republican Party	PRI	66,608	4.2	▲2.5	3	▲2
Italian Liberal Party	PLI	61,738	3.9	▼6.8	3	▼6
Italian Socialist Party of Proletarian Unity	PSIUP	21,813	1.4	▼0.7	1	Steady
Italian Democratic Party of Monarchist Unity	PDIUM	17,849	1.1	▼1.2	0	▼1
Independents		11,132	0.7	▲0.1	0	Steady
Total		1,586,607	100.0		80	

Sunday 13 June 1971. Source: La Stampa

=== City Council election, 1976 ===
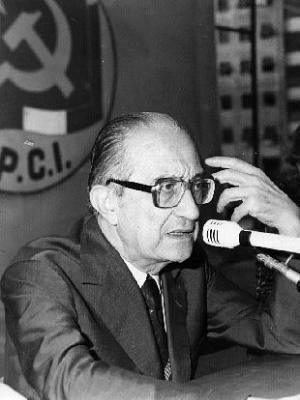
Giulio Carlo Argan led the first left-wing executive as Mayor (1976–1979)

The election took place on 20 June 1976.

Similarly to the previous year municipal elections which saw the unprecedented win of left-wing parties across the country, the Italian Communist Party became for the first time in history the first party with 35% of the votes. This extraordinary result led to the birth of the first red-giunta in the history of the city: the new coalition was formed by the leftist Socialist and Communist Party.

On 9 August 1976 the notorious left-wing independent art historian Giulio Carlo Argan was elected Mayor.

Parties		Votes	%	+/-	Seats	+/-
Italian Communist Party	PCI	676,207	35.5	▲10.1	30	▲9
Christian Democracy	DC	630,922	32.1	▲4.8	27	▲3
Italian Social Movement	MSI	201,344	10.6	▼5.6	8	▼5
Italian Socialist Party	PSI	145,793	7.6	▼0.7	6	▼1
Italian Republican Party	PRI	78,384	4.1	▼0.1	3	Steady
Italian Democratic Socialist Party	PSDI	70,211	3.7	▼6.7	3	▼5
Radical Party	PR	37,404	2.0	▲2.0	1	▲1
Italian Liberal Party	PLI	32,821	1.7	▼2.2	1	▼2
Proletarian Democracy	DP	31,395	1.6	▲1.6	1	▲1
Independents		1,795	0.1	▼0.6	0	Steady
Total		1,906,649	100.0		80	

Sunday 20 June 1976. Source: La Stampa

=== City Council election, 1981 ===
The election took place on 21 June 1981.

The left-wing coalition formed by communists and socialists won a decisive absolute majority of seats in the City Council.

Parties		Votes	%	+/-	Seats	+/-
Italian Communist Party	PCI	619,049	36.1	▲0.6	31	▲1
Christian Democracy	DC	508,144	29.6	▼2.5	25	▼2
Italian Socialist Party	PSI	173,555	10.1	▲2.5	8	▲2
Italian Social Movement	MSI	148,905	8.7	▼1.9	7	▼1
Italian Democratic Socialist Party	PSDI	79,213	4.6	▲0.9	4	▲1
Italian Republican Party	PRI	69,503	4.1	Steady	3	Steady
Italian Liberal Party	PLI	51,402	3.0	▲1.3	2	▲1
Proletarian Democracy	DP	19,069	1.1	▼0.5	0	▼1
Independents		48,145	2.8	▲2.7	0	Steady
Total		1,716,985	100.0		80	

Sunday 21 June 1981. Source: La Stampa

=== City Council election, 1985 ===
The election took place on 12 May 1985.

After the death of the incumbent communist Mayor Luigi Petroselli, his successor Ugo Vetere (PCI) was increasingly under the attack of Christian Democracy, which asked for his resignation in October 1984.

The election resulted in a defeat for the left-wing coalition. On 30 July 1985 Nicola Signorello (DC) was elected new Mayor at the head of a centre-left executive formed by the members of the Pentapartito coalition.

Parties		Votes	%	+/-	Seats	+/-
Christian Democracy	DC	629,952	33.1	▲3.5	28	▲3
Italian Communist Party	PCI	586,036	30.8	▼5.3	26	▼5
Italian Socialist Party	PSI	195,905	10.3	▲0.2	8	Steady
Italian Social Movement	MSI	177,198	9.3	▲0.6	7	Steady
Italian Republican Party	PRI	74,916	3.9	▼0.2	3	Steady
Italian Democratic Socialist Party	PSDI	67,775	3.6	▼1.0	3	▼1
Federation of Green Lists		51,291	2.7	▲2.7	2	▲2
Italian Liberal Party	PLI	48,423	2.5	▼0.5	2	Steady
Proletarian Democracy	DP	26,705	1.4	▲0.3	1	▲1
Independents		43,764	2.3	▼0.5	0	Steady
Total		1,901,965	100.0		80	

Sunday 12 May 1985. Source: La Stampa

=== City Council election, 1989 ===
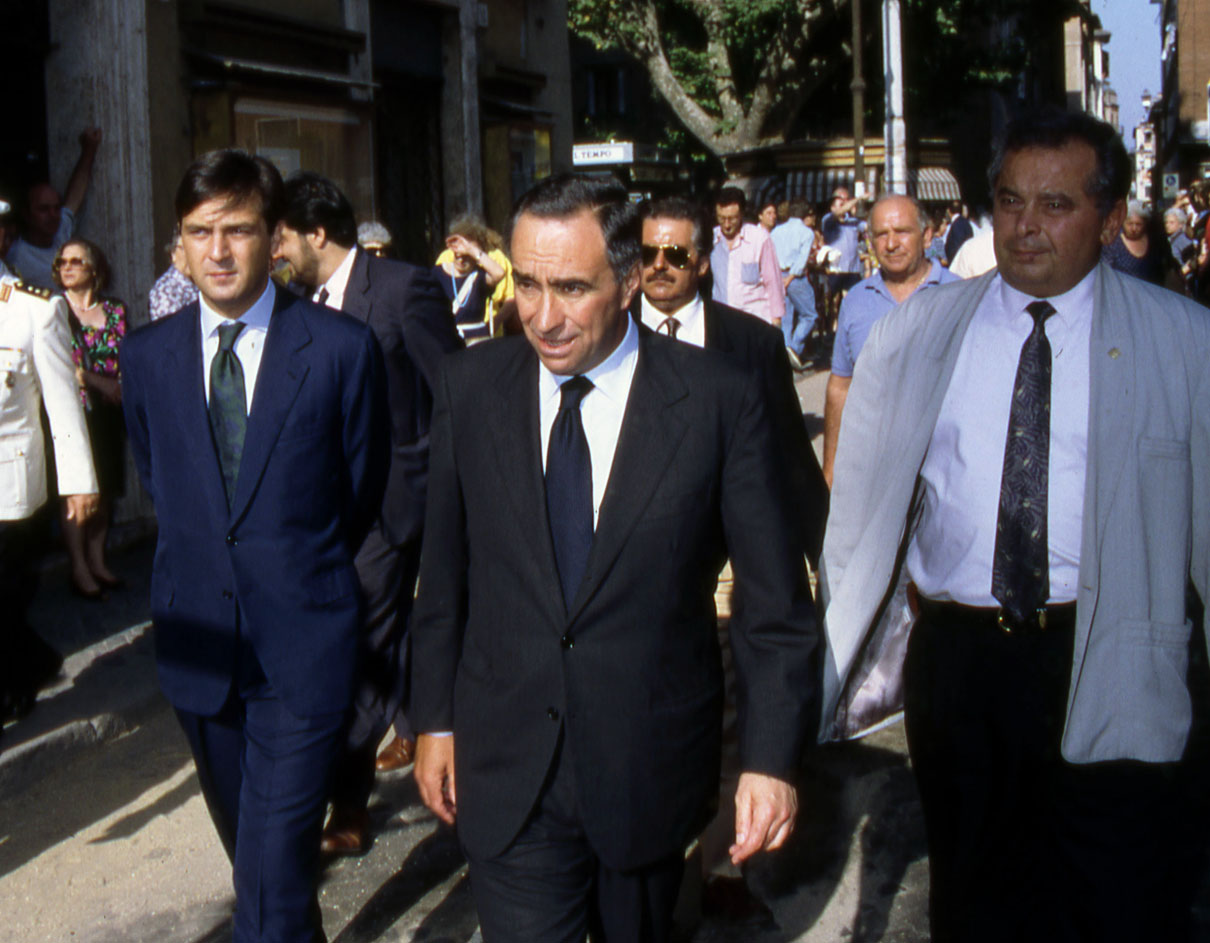
Franco Carraro (centre) in 1992. As first socialist Mayor, he led a centre-left executive formed by parties of Pentapartito coalition (1989–1993)

The snap election took place on 29 October 1989.

After a scandal related to the school canteens management, the incumbent Mayor Pietro Giubilo was forced to resign and, since the city Council failed to elected his successor, a snap election was called. Pentapartito alliance retained the majority of seats in the City Council and on 19 December 1989 elected the socialist sport manager Franco Carraro as new Mayor.

Parties		Votes	%	+/-	Seats	+/-
Christian Democracy	DC	570,890	33.0	▼0.1	29	▲1
Italian Communist Party	PCI	476,248	26.6	▼4.2	23	▼3
Italian Socialist Party	PSI	246,322	13.8	▲3.5	11	▲3
Federation of Green Lists		124,710	7.0	▲4.3	5	▲3
Italian Social Movement	MSI	122,628	6.7	▼2.6	5	▼2
Italian Republican Party	PRI	63,866	3.6	▼0.3	3	Steady
Italian Democratic Socialist Party	PSDI	53,942	3.0	▼0.6	2	▼1
Italian Liberal Party	PLI	33,750	1.9	▼0.6	1	▼1
Antiprohibitionists on Drugs		32,311	1.8	▲1.8	1	▲1
Proletarian Democracy	DP	10,121	0.6	▼0.8	0	▼0
Independents		55,637	2.9	▲0.3	0	Steady
Total		1,791,328	100.0		80	

Sunday 29 October 1989. Source: La Stampa
