= List of Italian Christian Democracy politicians =

A list of notable Christian Democracy politicians of Italy:

== Politicians ==
=== A ===
- Lucio Abis
- Lorenzo Acquarone
- Giovan Battista Adonnino
- Umberto Agnelli
- Angelino Alfano
- Beniamino Andreatta
- Tina Anselmi

=== B ===
- Mario Baccini
- Sergio Berlinguer
- Giovanni Bersani
- Giovanni Bianchi
- Rosy Bindi
- Carlo Bo
- Guido Bodrato
- Marcello Boldrini
- Bruno Boni
- Rocco Buttiglione

=== C ===
- Salvatore Cardinale
- Guido Carli
- Vincenzo Carollo
- Carlo Casini
- Angelo Cerica
- Vito Ciancimino
- Mario Cingolani
- Giuseppe Codacci Pisanelli
- Ludovico Corrao
- Alfredo Corrias
- Luigi Crespellani
- Salvatore Cuffaro

=== D ===
- Luciano Dal Falco
- Alcide De Gasperi
- Costante Degan
- Giovanni Del Rio

=== F ===
- Franca Falcucci
- Amintore Fanfani
- Publio Fiori
- Giuseppe Fioroni
- Marco Follini
- Dario Franceschini

=== G ===
- Remo Gaspari
- Pietro Giubilo
- Ermanno Gorrieri
- Giorgio Grigolli
- Giovanni Gronchi

=== I ===
- Rosa Russo Iervolino

=== J ===
- Angelo Raffaele Jervolino

=== L ===
- Giuseppe La Loggia
- Lodovico Ligato
- Salvo Lima
- Raffaele Lombardo

=== M ===
- Benedetto Majorana della Nicchiara
- Franco Maria Malfatti
- Piero Malvestiti
- Nicola Mancino
- Raimondo Manzini
- Giovanni Marcora
- Franco Marini
- Alberto Marvelli
- Piersanti Mattarella
- Giuseppe Medici
- Piero Mentasti
- Francesco Merloni
- Silvio Milazzo
- Tommaso Morlino
- Angelo Munzone

=== O ===
- Leoluca Orlando

=== P ===
- Filippo Maria Pandolfi
- Aldo Patriciello
- Lapo Pistelli
- Romano Prodi

=== R ===
- Gianni Rivera
- Virginio Rognoni
- Attilio Ruffini

=== S ===
- Adolfo Sarti
- Vittorio Sbardella
- Claudio Scajola
- Oscar Luigi Scalfaro
- Pietro Scoppola
- Vincenzo Scotti
- Antonio Segni
- Mariotto Segni
- Gustavo Selva
- Nicola Signorello
- Pietro Soddu
- Gian Mario Spacca
- Giovanni Spagnolli
- Giuseppe Spataro
- Gaetano Stammati
- Luigi Sturzo

=== T ===
- Bruno Tabacci
- Paolo Emilio Taviani
- Zefferino Tomè
- Umberto Tupini

=== V ===
- Riccardo Ventre
- Donato Veraldi

=== Z ===
- Giuseppe Zamberletti
- Franco Zeffirelli
- Ennio Zelioli-Lanzini

== Deputies ==
=== A ===
- Giancarlo Abete
- Salvatore Aldisio
- Giuseppe Alessi
- Giulio Andreotti
- Dario Antoniozzi

=== B ===
- Piero Bargellini
- Gerardo Bianco
- Antonio Bisaglia
- Guido Bodrato
- Vito Bonsignore

=== C ===
- Pier Ferdinando Casini
- Pierluigi Castagnetti
- Paolo Cirino Pomicino
- Francesco Cossiga
- Carlo Cremaschi

=== D ===
- Clelio Darida
- Ciriaco De Mita
- Augusto Del Noce

=== E ===
- Franco Evangelisti

=== F ===
- Mario Fasino
- Arnaldo Forlani
- Roberto Formigoni

=== G ===
- Antonio Gava
- Giovanni Gioia
- Carlo Giovanardi
- Giovanni Goria
- Achille Grandi
- Luigi Gui
- Angela Maria Guidi Cingolani

=== K ===
- Bruno Kessler

=== L ===
- Giorgio La Pira
- Giuseppe Lazzati
- Giovanni Leone
- Concetto Lo Bello

=== M ===
- Mino Martinazzoli
- Clemente Mastella
- Bernardo Mattarella
- Sergio Mattarella
- Giuseppe Micheli
- Aldo Moro

=== P ===
- Giuseppe Pella
- Attilio Piccioni
- Flaminio Piccoli
- Giuseppe Pisanu

=== R ===
- Franco Restivo
- Mariano Rumor

=== S ===
- Oscar Luigi Scalfaro

=== T ===
- Fernando Tambroni

=== V ===
- Athos Valsecchi

=== Z ===
- Benigno Zaccagnini
- Adone Zoli
