= Mayor of Rome =

Head of the government of the city of Rome

- Sindaco di Roma

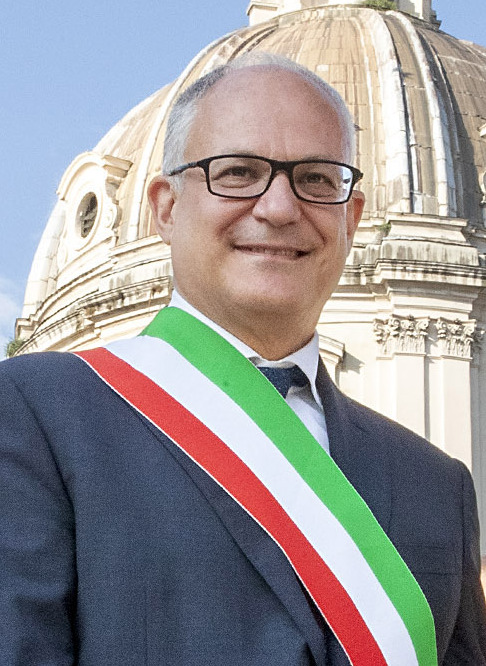
- Incumbent; Roberto Gualtieri since 21 October 2021
- Seat: Palazzo Senatorio
- Appointer: Electorate of Rome
- Term length: 5 years, renewable once
- Inaugural holder: Francesco Rospigliosi Pallavicini
- Formation: 23 September 1870
- Deputy: Silvia Scozzese
- Salary: €10,000 monthly

The mayor of Rome (Italian: sindaco di Roma) is an elected politician who, along with the Rome City Council (Italian: Assemblea Capitolina) of 48 members, is accountable for the strategic government of Rome. As Rome is a comune speciale since 2009, the office is different from the offices of the other Italian cities. The title is the equivalent of Lord Mayor in the meaning of an actual executive leader.

== Overview ==
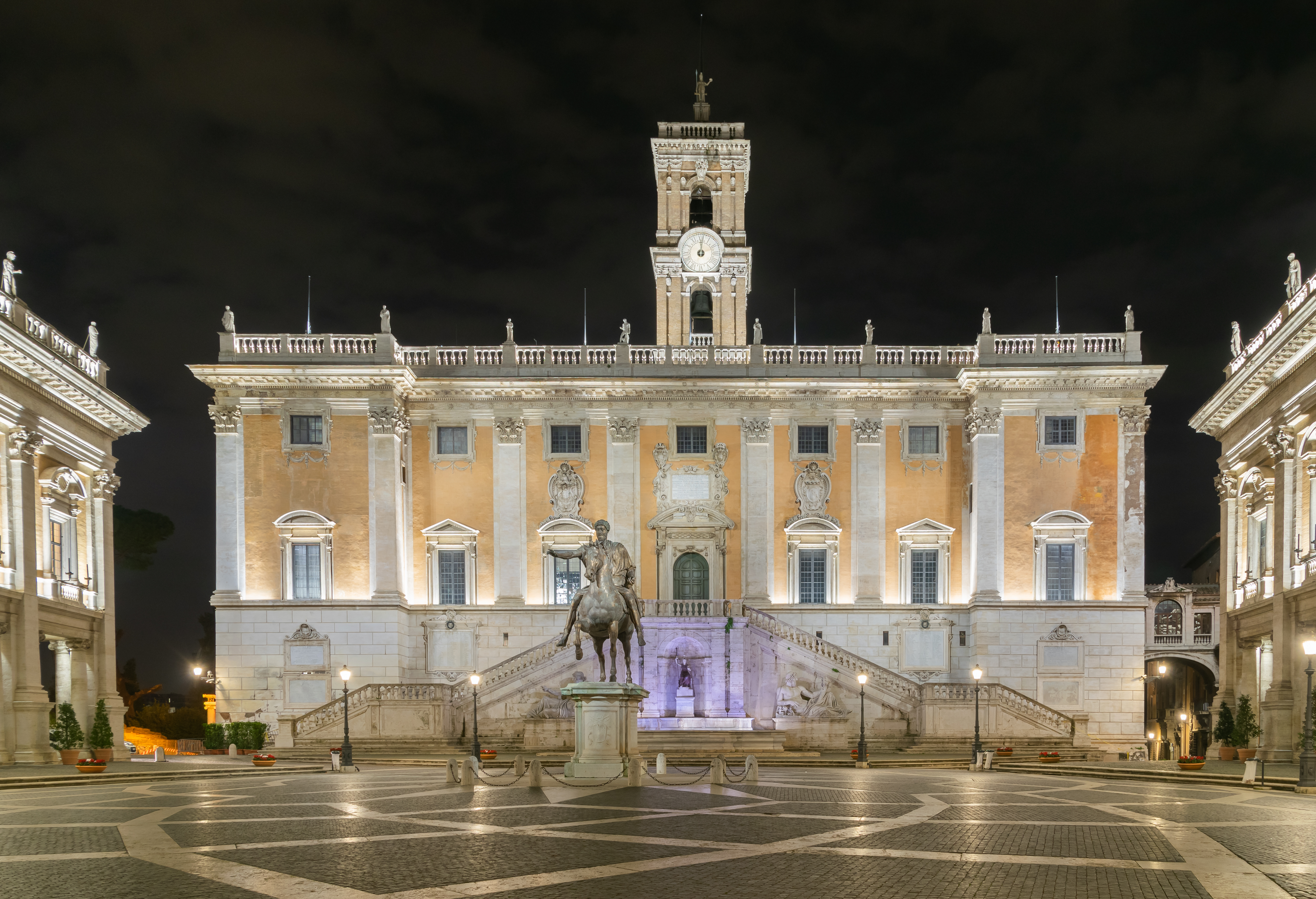
The seat of the mayor, Palazzo Senatorio on Capitoline Hill.

According to the City of Rome Statutes, the mayor of Rome is a member of the Rome City Council (Italian: Assemblea Capitolina) ex-oficio as its overall head. The mayor is elected by the population of Rome. Citizens elect also the members of the City Council, which also controls the mayor's policy guidelines and is able to enforce the mayor's resignation by a motion of no confidence. The mayor is entitled to appoint and release the members of his cabinet, which are twelve (Italian: Assessori delle Giunta Capitolina) according to the Italian Constitution. The seat of the City Council is the city hall Palazzo Senatorio on the Capitoline Hill.

== History ==
When the city of Rome was founded, it was initially ruled by Kings. After the last King was overthrown, it would be ruled by Consuls who were elected by the Assembly of the Centuries. The Assembly of the Centuries was an extremely oligarchic voting system, with voters organized into blocks based on wealth, and each block having but one vote to elect the Consuls.

During the time of the empire, Rome was ruled by its Emperors, although the Consuls continued to exist in a largely ceremonial role. The Assembly of the Centuries was abolished, and the power to elect Consuls was transferred to the Senate alone. Once the Western Roman Empire ended, Consuls retook charge of the city, even as Kings once again ruled larger territories that included Rome. By this time there were no longer two Consuls in Rome, but one, the position of Consul Posteriori having been ceded to the younger Eastern Roman Empire.

In 534, a man named Decius Paulinus served as the very last Consul of Rome; the last Consul was Byzantine Emperor Leo VI, but he did not rule from Rome. The Senate survived as a city council of sorts, until it passed its final acts and voted to disband in 603. All the while, law and order were largely kept by various foreign occupiers (and their appointed city-governors).

In 756, the Donation of Pepin made Rome the capital of a newly formed Federation of the Papal States. After this, the city would be directly ruled by the same Popes who also ruled the much larger Papal States territory. During the final third or so of its existence, the Papal States also had a Governor of Rome, appointed by the Pope to rule the city in his name, allowing the Pope himself to focus on national and ecclesial matters.

Having been the capital of the Papal States, Rome did not receive its modern Mayor until 1870, when it became the capital of the Kingdom of Italy. The new Mayor served as a member of the city council, and he was appointed every three years by the King of Italy. Then since 1889 the Mayor was elected every four years by the City Council; however, the Italian fascist dictatorship abolished mayors and City Councils in 1926, replacing them with a single authoritarian Rector (Podestà) chosen by the National Fascist Party. The rector of Rome was called Governor (Governatore).

After World War II, the Mayor was chosen by the City Council. In 1993, the election of the Mayor was transferred from the City Council to direct election by the people. In 2001, the schedule of such elections was changed from every 4 years to every 5 years.

== List of mayors of Rome ==
=== Papal States (1558–1870) ===
From 1558 to 1870, the Papal States created the office of Governatore (Governor), also called Vice Camerlengo, chosen by the Pope.

- 1558–1560 – Virgilio Rosario
- 1560–1588 – Giacomo Savelli
- 1588–1603 – Girolamo Rusticucci
- 1603–1605 – Camillo Borghese (future Pope Paul V)
- 1605–1610 – Girolamo Pamphili
- 1610–1629 – Giovanni Garzia Millini
- 1629–1671 – Marzio Ginetti
- Acting 1671 – Paluzzo Paluzzi Altieri degli Albertoni
- 1671–1714 – Gaspare Carpegna
- 1714–1721 – Giandomenico Paracciani
- 1721–1726 – Fabrizio Paolucci
- 1726–1732 – Prospero Marefoschi
- 1732–1759 – Giovanni Antonio Guadagni
- 1759–1762 – Antonio Maria Erba-Odescalchi
- 1762–1793 – Marcantonio Colonna
- 1793–1795 – Andrea Corsini
- 1795–1810 – Giulio Maria della Somaglia
- 1810–1813 – Antonio Despuig y Dameto
- 1813–1820 – Lorenzo Litta
- 1820–1823 – Annibale della Genga (future Pope Leo XII)
- Acting 1823–1824 – Giuseppe della Porta Rodiani
- 1824–1834 – Placido Zurla
- 1834–1838 – Carlo Odescalchi
- 1838–1841 – Giuseppe della Porta Rodiani
- 1841–1870 – Costantino Patrizi Naro

=== Kingdom of Italy (1870–1946) ===
From 1870, when Rome was annexed, the Kingdom of Italy created the office of the Mayor of Rome (Sindaco di Roma), chosen by the City council. In 1926, the Fascist dictatorship abolished mayors and City councils, replacing them with a single authoritarian Governor (Governatore) chosen by the National Fascist Party.

| | Mayor | Term start | Term end | Party |
|---|---|---|---|---|
| – | Michelangelo Caetani | 23 September 1870 | 30 September 1870 | Independent |
| – | Guido Orazio Falconieri | 1 October 1870 | 28 Novembren 1870 | Independent |
| – | Giuseppe Lunati | 29 November 1870 | 20 December 1870 | Independent |
| – | Filippo Doria Pamphili | 21 December 1870 | March 1871 | Independent |
| – | Giovanni Angelini | March 1871 | 16 April 1871 | Independent |
| 1 | Francesco Rospigliosi Pallavicini | 16 April 1871 | 21 October 1871 | Independent |
| 2 | Luigi Pianciani | 29 July 1873 | 5 August 1874 | Left |
| 3 | Pietro Venturi | 15 January 1875 | 7 November 1877 | Left |
| 4 | Emanuele Ruspoli | 18 July 1878 | 20 July 1880 | Right |
| (2) | Luigi Pianciani | October 1881 | May 1882 | Left |
| 5 | Leopoldo Torlonia | May 1882 | 31 December 1887 | Right |
| 6 | Alessandro Guiccioli | 24 October 1888 | 28 November 1889 | Left |
| 7 | Augusto Armellini | 28 November 1889 | 20 June 1890 | Left |
| 8 | Onorato Caetani | 29 December 1890 | 14 November 1892 | Right |
| (4) | Emanuele Ruspoli | 14 November 1892 | 29 November 1899 | Right |
| 9 | Prospero Colonna di Paliano | December 1899 | October 1904 | Right |
| 10 | Enrico Cruciani Alibrandi | 10 July 1905 | 10 July 1907 | Independent |
| 11 | Ernesto Nathan | 25 November 1907 | 8 December 1913 | Radical |
| (9) | Prospero Colonna di Paliano | 6 July 1914 | 8 June 1919 | Liberal |
| 12 | Adolfo Apolloni | 8 June 1919 | 25 November 1920 | Liberal |
| 13 | Luigi Rava | 25 November 1920 | 23 May 1921 | Liberal |
| 14 | Giannetto Valli | 23 May 1921 | 26 June 1922 | Liberal |
| 15 | Filippo Cremonesi | 26 June 1922 | 1 January 1926 | Independent |
Fascist Governor (1926–1944)
| 1 | Filippo Cremonesi | 1 January 1926 | 9 December 1926 | PNF |
| 2 | Ludovico Spada Veralli Potenziani | 9 December 1926 | 13 September 1928 | PNF |
| 3 | Francesco Boncompagni Ludovisi | 13 September 1928 | 23 January 1935 | PNF |
| 4 | Giuseppe Bottai | 23 January 1935 | 15 November 1936 | PNF |
| 5 | Piero Colonna | 15 November 1936 | 30 August 1939 | PNF |
| 6 | Giangiacomo Borghese | 30 August 1939 | 21 August 1943 | PNF |
| 7 | Riccardo Motta | 21 August 1943 | 6 January 1944 | PFR |
| 8 | Giovanni Orgera | 6 January 1944 | 4 June 1944 | PFR |
Allied occupation (1944–1946)
| 16 | Filippo Andrea VI Doria Pamphili | 10 June 1944 | 10 December 1946 | Independent |

=== Republic of Italy (1946–present) ===
==== City Council election (1946–1993) ====
From 1946 to 1993, the mayor of Rome was chosen by the City Council.

| | Mayor | Term start | Term end | Party | Coalition | Election |
|---|---|---|---|---|---|---|
| 17 | Salvatore Rebecchini (1891–1977) | 10 December 1946 | 5 November 1947 | DC | DC | 1946 |
| 17 | Salvatore Rebecchini (1891–1977) | 5 November 1947 | 4 July 1952 | DC | DC • PLI • UQ | 1947 |
| 17 | Salvatore Rebecchini (1891–1977) | 4 July 1952 | 2 July 1956 | DC | DC • PLI • PRI | 1952 |
| 18 | Umberto Tupini (1889–1973) | 2 July 1956 | 10 January 1958 | DC | Centrism (DC • PLI • PRI • PSDI) | 1956 |
| 19 | Urbano Cioccetti (1905–1978) | 10 January 1958 | 11 July 1961 | DC | Centrism (DC • PLI • PRI • PSDI) | 1956 |
| - | Special Prefectural Commissioner tenure (11 July 1961 – 17 July 1962) (Note: Nominated by the Prefect after the City Council failed to elect a Mayor.) | | | | | 1960 |
| 20 | Glauco Della Porta (1920–1976) | 17 July 1962 | 12 March 1964 | DC | Organic Centre-left (DC • PSI • PSDI • PRI) | 1962 |
| 21 | Amerigo Petrucci (1922–1983) | 12 March 1964 | 28 July 1966 | DC | Organic Centre-left (DC • PSI • PSDI • PRI) | 1962 |
| 21 | Amerigo Petrucci (1922–1983) | 28 July 1966 | 29 December 1967 | DC | Organic Centre-left (DC • PSI • PSDI • PRI) | 1966 |
| 22 | Rinaldo Santini (1914–2013) | 29 December 1967 | 30 July 1969 | DC | Organic Centre-left (DC • PSI • PSDI • PRI) | 1966 |
| 23 | Clelio Darida (1927–2017) | 30 July 1969 | 7 August 1971 | DC | DC • PSI • PSDI | 1966 |
| 23 | Clelio Darida (1927–2017) | 7 August 1971 | 9 August 1976 | DC | DC | 1971 |
| 24 | Giulio Carlo Argan (1909–1992) | 9 August 1976 | 29 September 1979 | SI | Red Executive (PCI • PSI • PSDI • PRI) | 1976 |
| 25 | Luigi Petroselli (1932–1981) | 29 September 1979 | 7 October 1981 (Note: Died in office.) | PCI | Red Executive (PCI • PSI • PSDI • PRI) | 1976 |
| 26 | Ugo Vetere (1924–2013) | 15 October 1981 | 30 July 1985 | PCI | Red Executive (PCI • PSI • PSDI • PRI) | 1981 |
| 27 | Nicola Signorello (1926–2022) | 30 July 1985 | 6 August 1988 | DC | Pentapartito (DC • PSI • PSDI • PRI • PLI) | 1985 |
| 28 | Pietro Giubilo (b. 1942) | 6 August 1988 | 19 July 1989 | DC | Pentapartito (DC • PSI • PSDI • PRI • PLI) | 1985 |
| - | Special Prefectural Commissioner tenure (19 July 1989 – 19 December 1989) (Note: Nominated by the Prefect after the Mayor lost the support of the majority of the City Council.) | | | | | |
| 29 | Franco Carraro (b. 1939) | 19 December 1989 | 19 April 1993 | PSI | Pentapartito (DC • PSI • PSDI • PRI • PLI) | 1989 |
| - | Special Prefectural Commissioner tenure (19 April 1993 – 6 December 1993) (Note: Nominated by the Prefect after the Mayor and the members of the City Council resigned in order to hold a new election under the provision of the new local electoral law.) | | | | | |

==== Direct election (since 1993) ====
Since 1993, under provisions of new local administration law, the mayor of Rome is chosen by direct election, originally every four, and since 2001 every five years.

| | Mayor of Rome | Took office | Left office | Party | Coalition | Election |
|---|---|---|---|---|---|---|
| 30 | Francesco Rutelli (b. 1954) | 6 December 1993 | 17 November 1997 | FdV | Alliance of Progressives (PDS-FdV-AD-LP) | 1993 |
| 30 | Francesco Rutelli (b. 1954) | 17 November 1997 | 8 January 2001 (Note: He left the office because he was candidate at the 2001 general election as Prime Minister.) | FdV | The Olive Tree (PDS-PRC-FdV-PPI-LP-SDI) | 1997 |
Enzo Mosino, Special Prefectural Commissioner (8 January 2001 – 1 June 2001)
| 31 | Walter Veltroni (b. 1955) | 1 June 2001 | 1 June 2006 | DS; PD | The Olive Tree (DS-FdV-DL-PRC) | 2001 |
| 31 | Walter Veltroni (b. 1955) | 1 June 2006 | 13 February 2008 (Note: He left the office because he was candidate at the 2008 general election as Prime Minister.) | DS; PD | The Olive Tree (DS-FdV-DL-PRC-IdV-PdCI) | 2006 |
Mario Morcone, Special Prefectural Commissioner (13 February 2008 – 28 April 2008)
| 32 | Gianni Alemanno (b. 1958) | 28 April 2008 | 12 June 2013 | PdL | PdL | 2008 |
| 33 | Ignazio Marino (b. 1955) | 12 June 2013 | 31 October 2015 (Note: Ousted from office after more than half the city's councillors stepped down.) | PD | PD • SEL | 2013 |
Francesco Paolo Tronca, Special Prefectural Commissioner (31 October 2015 – 22 June 2016)
| 34 | Virginia Raggi (b. 1978) | 22 June 2016 | 21 October 2021 | M5S | M5S | 2016 |
| 35 | Roberto Gualtieri (b. 1966) | 21 October 2021 (Note: Election originally scheduled for June 2021 and then postponed due to the COVID-19 pandemic in Italy.) | Incumbent | PD | PD • SI • EV • DemoS | 2021 |

=== By time in office ===
| Rank | Mayor | Political Party | Total time in office |
|---|---|---|---|
| 1 | Salvatore Rebecchini | DC | 9 years, 205 days |
| 2 | Francesco Rutelli | FdV | 7 years, 33 days |
| 3 | Clelio Darida | DC | 7 years, 10 days |
| 4 | Walter Veltroni | DS | 6 years, 257 days |
| 5 | Virginia Raggi | M5S | 5 years, 121 days |
| 6 | Gianni Alemanno | PdL | 5 years, 45 days |
| 7 | Roberto Gualtieri | PD | 5 years, 11 days |
| 8 | Amerigo Petrucci | DC | 3 years, 292 days |
| 9 | Ugo Vetere | PCI | 3 years, 288 days |
| 10 | Urbano Cioccetti | DC | 3 years, 182 days |
| 11 | Franco Carraro | PSI | 3 years, 121 days |
| 12 | Giulio Carlo Argan | SI | 3 years, 51 days |
| 13 | Nicola Signorello | DC | 3 years, 7 days |
| 14 | Ignazio Marino | PD | 2 years, 141 days |
| 15 | Luigi Petroselli | PCI | 2 years, 8 days |
| 16 | Glauco Della Porta | DC | 1 year, 239 days |
| 17 | Rinaldo Santini | DC | 1 year, 213 days |
| 18 | Umberto Tupini | DC | 1 year, 192 days |
| 19 | Pietro Giubilo | DC | 347 days |

== Deputy Mayor ==
The office of the Deputy Mayor of Rome was officially created in 1993 with the adoption of the new local administration law. The Deputy Mayor is nominated and eventually dismissed by the Mayor.

| # | Deputy | Term start | Term end | Party | Mayor |
|---|---|---|---|---|---|
| 1 | Walter Tocci | 8 December 1993 | 17 November 1997 | PDS; DS | Rutelli |
| 1 | Walter Tocci | 20 November 1997 | 8 January 2001 | PDS; DS | Rutelli |
| 2 | Enrico Gasbarra | 4 June 2001 | 17 June 2003 (Note: Resigned after being elected President of the Province of Rome.) | DL | Veltroni |
| 3 | Mariapia Garavaglia | 24 June 2003 | 1 June 2006 | DL | Veltroni |
| 3 | Mariapia Garavaglia | 8 June 2006 | 13 February 2008 | DL | Veltroni |
| 4 | Mario Cutrufo | 16 May 2008 | 15 July 2011 (Note: Resigned.) | PdL | Alemanno |
| 5 | Sveva Belviso | 19 July 2011 | 12 June 2013 | PdL | Alemanno |
| 6 | Luigi Nieri | 27 June 2013 | 27 July 2015 (Note: Resigned.) | SEL | Marino |
| 7 | Marco Causi | 28 July 2015 | 31 October 2015 | PD | Marino |
| 8 | Daniele Frongia | 26 June 2016 | 17 December 2016 (Note: Resigned.) | M5S | Raggi |
| 9 | Luca Bergamo | 22 December 2016 | 25 January 2021 (Note: Dismissed by the Mayor.) | M5S | Raggi |
| 10 | Pietro Calabrese | 27 January 2021 | 21 October 2021 | M5S | Raggi |
| 11 | Silvia Scozzese | 3 November 2021 | Incumbent | Ind | Gualtieri |
