= Alibrandi =

Alibrandi is a surname of Italian origin. Notable people with the surname include:

- Alessandro Alibrandi (1960–1981), Italian neofascist terrorist
- Enrico Cruciani Alibrandi (1839–1921), Italian politician
- Gaetano Alibrandi (1914–2003), Italian titular archbishop
- Girolamo Alibrandi (1470–1524), Italian painter

== See also ==
- Looking for Alibrandi (film), is an Australian film
- Looking for Alibrandi (novel), novel of Australian author Melina Marchetta
