= Cremaschi =

Cremaschi is an Italian surname. Notable people with the surname include:

- Atilio Cremaschi (1923–2007), Chilean footballer
- Carlo Cremaschi (born 1992), Italian footballer
- Benjamin Cremaschi (born 2005), American footballer
