= Franco Evangelisti =

Franco Evangelisti may refer to:

- Franco Evangelisti (composer) (1926–1980), Italian composer and sound theorist
- Franco Evangelisti (politician) (1923–1993), Italian politician
