= Giannetto =

Giannetto is a name. Notable people with the name include:

- Giannetto, a character in the Italian opera La gazza ladra
- Giannetto De Rossi (1942–2021), Italian makeup and special effects artist
- Giannetto Termanini, Italian Olympic gymnast
- Giannetto Valli (1869–1927), Italian politician
- Randal Giannetto (born 1956), American politician
