= Cruciani =

Cruciani is an Italian surname. Notable people with the surname include:

- Andrés Cruciani (born 1966), Argentine footballer and manager
- Enrico Cruciani Alibrandi (1839–1921), Italian politician
- Giuseppe Cruciani (born 1966), Italian radio presenter, television presenter and journalist
- Michele Cruciani (born 1986), Italian footballer
- Paola Tiziana Cruciani (born 1958), Italian actress, comedian and playwright
