= Cremonesi =

Cremonesi is an Italian surname. Notable people with the surname include:

- Carlo Cremonesi (1866–1943), Italian cardinal
- Filippo Cremonesi (1872–1942), Italian banker and politician
- Michele Cremonesi (born 1988), Italian footballer
