= Amerigo Petrucci =

Italian politician (1922–1983)

Amerigo Petrucci OMRI
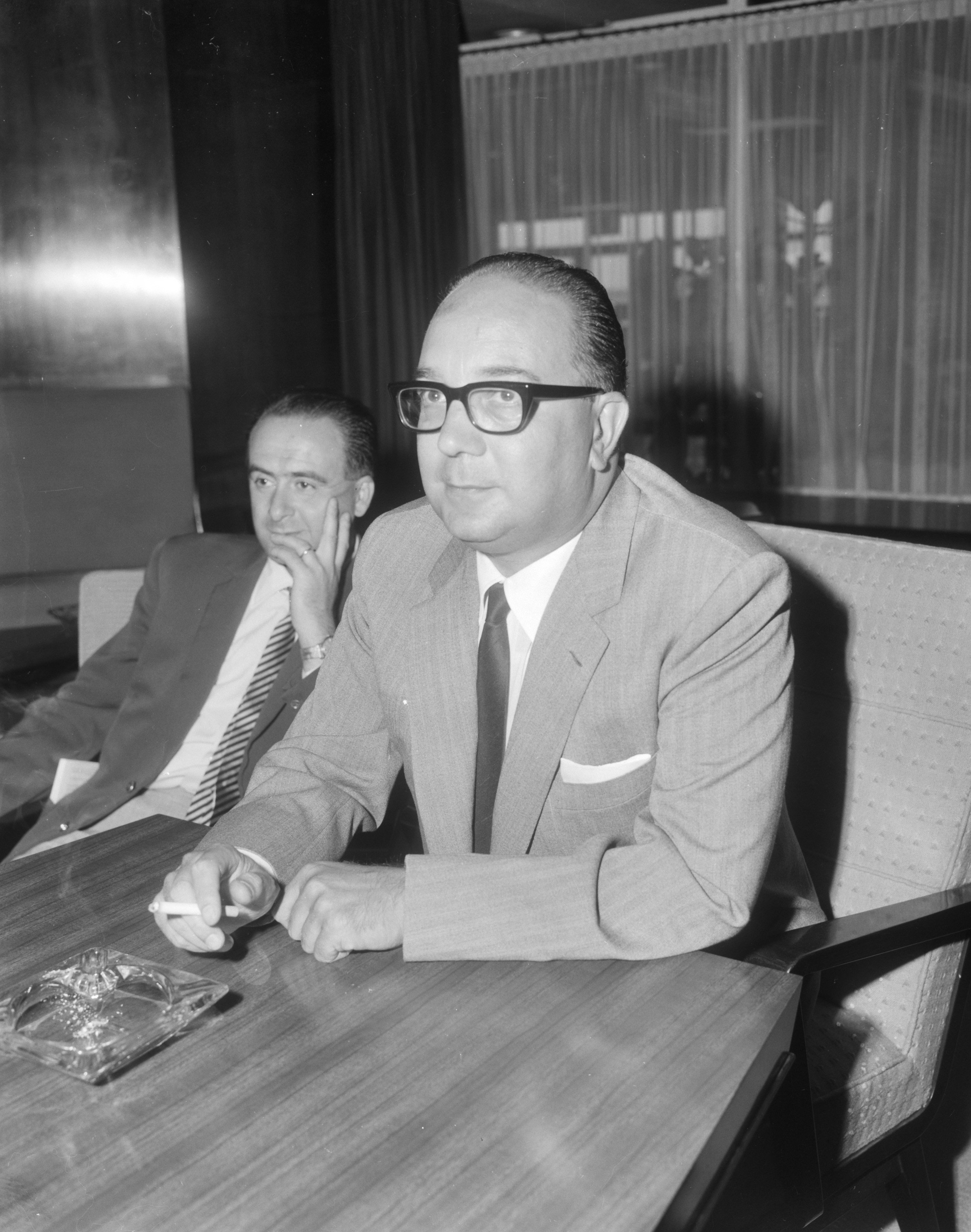

Mayor of Rome
- In office 12 March 1964 – 13 November 1967
- Preceded by: Glauco Della Porta
- Succeeded by: Rinaldo Santini

Member of the Chamber of Deputies
- In office 25 May 1972 – 31 July 1983
- Constituency: Rome

Personal details
- Born: 17 December 1922 Rome, Lazio, Italy
- Died: 31 July 1983 (aged 60) Anzio, Lazio, Italy
- Party: Christian Democracy

Amerigo Petrucci (17 December 1922 – 31 July 1983) was an Italian Christian Democrat politician. He was mayor of Rome from 1964 to 1967. He was appointed Knight Grand Cross of the Order of Merit of the Italian Republic in 1963.

== Biography ==
After graduating in philosophy, Petrucci joined the Christian Democracy in 1944. He was a provincial councilor of Rome from 1952 to 1960 and a municipal councilor from 1960 to 1972; by 1961 the Christian Democracy had become the number two party in Rome. From December 1960 to July 1961, Petrucci was assessor in charge of the "new town plan", in the minority municipal government led by Urbano Cioccetti. In 1962 Petrucci was re-confirmed as councillor in charge of planning in the city government, now headed by Glauco Della Porta.

Two years later, Della Porta resigned, and on 13 March 1964 Petrucci was elected mayor, at the head of a centre-left government. During his mandate, Rome experienced a notable phase of economic recovery. On 31 March 1966, a resolution began the city's administrative decentralization, with the creation of twelve municipal districts.

In the local elections of 12 June 1966, the centre-left obtained an absolute majority in the municipal council of Rome and Petrucci was re-elected mayor. However, he wished to stand as a candidate for the Chamber of Deputies in the 1968 general elections, and at that time, mayors of large cities were not permitted to do so. Petrucci therefore resigned as mayor on 13 November 1967, assuming the post of councillor for the budget in the new council led by Rinaldo Santini. On 20 January 1968 he was indicted and placed in preventive detention for a few months, due to an incident linked to the management of the National Maternity and Childhood Work (OMNI) agency of which he had previously been commissioner. Petrucci was acquitted by the Court of Rome on 28 April 1972.

Petrucci was elected as a deputy for the first time in 1972, then re-elected in 1976, 1979 and 1983. He was Undersecretary of Defense from 31 July 1976 to 1 December 1982; he held this office in all the governments of the VII and VIII Legislature, with the exception of the fifth Fanfani government.

He died in 1983 following a heart attack.
