= Pietro Venturi =

Italian lawyer and politician

Pietro Venturi was an Italian lawyer and politician. He was twice acting mayor of Rome, first from May to November 1872, and then from August 1874 to January 1875. He was mayor of Rome, Kingdom of Italy, from January 1875 to November 1877. He was also a member of the Chamber of Deputies in the XIII and XV legislatures (1876–1880, 1882–1886).

Preceded by Luigi Pianciani	Mayor of Rome; 1875–1877	Succeeded by Emanuele Ruspoli
