= Ernesto Nathan =

Mayor of Rome (1907–1913)

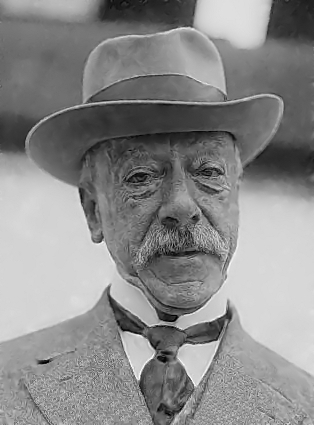

Mayor of Rome
- In office 25 November 1907 – 8 December 1913
- Preceded by: Enrico Cruciani Alibrandi
- Succeeded by: Prospero Colonna di Paliano

Personal details
- Born: 5 October 1845 London, United Kingdom
- Died: 9 April 1921 (aged 72) Rome, Italy
- Party: Historical Left (1870–1889); Radical Party (1889–1921)
- Profession: Politician

Ernesto Nathan (5 October 1848 – 9 April 1921) was an English-Italian politician who was the mayor of Rome from November 1907 to December 1913.

== Biography ==
Nathan was born in London in 1845 to Sara Levi, an Italian from Pesaro, and Mayer Moses Nathan, a naturalised Briton of German origin, both of Jewish heritage. His father died when Ernesto was a teenager.

He spent his youth in Florence, Lugano, Milan and Sardinia, where he administered a cotton mill. He was attracted by the revolutionary ideas of Giuseppe Mazzini, and in 1870, at 25, he moved to Rome as administrator of La Roma del Popolo. His house in Rome became a centre of literarian and political debate, with figures like Giosuè Carducci and Francesco Crispi Nine years later he was a member Parliament for Crispi's left-wing party. In 1888 he obtained Italian citizenship.

In 1887 he became a member of the Masonic Grande Oriente d'Italia, of which he was named Grand Master in 1899 and later in 1917.

In April 1889, Nathan was elected to the Town Council of Rome, and was elected mayor of the city in November 1907. He retained the charge until 1913, and was elected for a second time in November 1911.

The first mayor of Rome who did not belong to the land-owning elite which had controlled politics in the city until then, and motivated by a deep belief in the importance of secular, ethical politics, Nathan tried to regulate as much as possible the intense building programs that had erupted all around the city after it became the capital of Italy in 1871. He also strove to promote a secular education system, at a time when education in Rome was still dominated by Catholic institutions. He opened more than 150 kindergartens. The 40th anniversary commemoration of the Capture of Porta Pia in 1910 heightened tension between Nathan's anticlerical administration and the Holy See.

With respect to public works, Nathan inaugurated the Vittoriano, the Palace of Justice (Palazzo di Giustizia), the Archaeological Walk on the Aventine and Caelian Hills, and the National Stadium, the current Stadio Flaminio, Rome's first modern building for sports events. A public transport network (ATAC) was created in 1911, as well as a city energy company (ACEA), in 1912.

He died on 9 April 1921.

== Sources ==
- Claudio Rendina, Enciclopedia di Roma, Newton Compton, Rome, 2000.

Preceded by Enrico Cruciani Alibrandi	Mayor of Rome; 1907–1913	Succeeded by Prospero Colonna di Paliano
