= Adolfo Apolloni =

Italian sculptor (1855–1923)

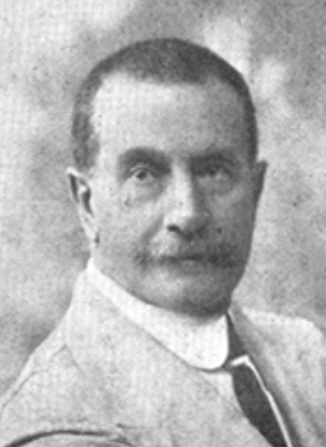
Adolfo Apolloni

Adolfo Apolloni (1 March 1855 – 19 October 1923) was an Italian sculptor. He was born in Rome, in what was then the Papal States. He attended the Accademia di San Luca. He participated in the World's Columbian Exposition in Chicago, IL USA in 1893. He participated in an international art exposition in Venice in 1899. He was mayor of Rome (1919–1920). He died in Rome, Kingdom of Italy.

Preceded by Prospero Colonna di Paliano	Mayor of Rome; 1919–1920	Succeeded by Luigi Rava
