= Luigi Pianciani =

Italian politician

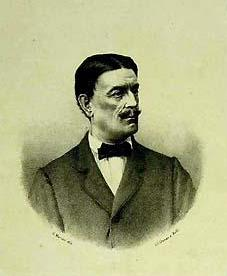
Luigi Pianciani

Luigi Pianciani (10 August 1810 – 17 October 1890) was an Italian politician and Freemason. He was born in and was twice mayor of Rome. He died in Spoleto.

== Biography ==
Count Luigi Pianciani was born in Rome in 1810 into a patrician family of Spoleto origin with ties to the Roman Curia. As a young man, he rebelled against the conservative traditions of his family home and soon became a sympathizer of Mazzini’s Giovine Italia. He was the eldest son of Count Vincenzo Pianciani (1789–1856) and Amalia Ruspoli (1790–1868), daughter of Prince Ruspoli family of Cerveteri. He had seven siblings: Laura (1812), Carlo (1815), Leopoldo (1817), Camillo (1819), who died in August 1829, Francesco (1821), Alessandro (1824), and Adolfo (1826). He married Rose Teresa Ducohorne, a woman of humble origins whom he met in Paris. He lived with her until her death (1871); they had no children. In his second marriage, he married Letizia Castellazzi, and they adopted a girl, Ines Pianciani.

Preceded by Francesco Rospigliosi Pallavicini	Mayor of Rome; 1873–1874	Succeeded by Pietro Venturi
Preceded by Emanuele Ruspoli	Mayor of Rome; 1881–1882	Succeeded by Leopoldo Torlonia

== Bibliography ==
- Stato Maggiore Esercito italiano, Corpo dei Volontari Italiani (Garibaldi), Fatti d'armi di Valsabbia e Tirolo, 1867.
- Gualtiero Castellini, Pagine garibaldine (1848-1866), Torino, Ed. Fratelli Bocca, 1909.
- Giuseppe Santorelli (1910). La presa di Spoleto (17 settembre 1860) e il rimpatrio del patriota proscritto Luigi Pianciani (21 aprile 1861): cenni storici. Spoleto: Tipografia dell'Umbria.
- U. Zaniboni Ferino, Bezzecca 1866. La campagna garibaldina dall'Adda al Garda, Trento 1966.
- Filippo Mazzonis (1988). L'attività politica di Luigi Pianciani in Umbria. Spoleto: Cassa di Risparmio di Spoleto.
- Filippo Mazzonis, Luigi Pianciani: frammenti, ipotesi e documenti per una biografia politica, Ateneo 1992.
- Gian Biagio Furiozzi (1992). Luigi Pianciani e l'Umbria dopo l'Unità. Perugia: Benucci.
- Aa.Vv. (1992). Romano Ugolini (ed.). Luigi Pianciani, tra riforme e rivoluzione. Napoli: Edizioni scientifiche italiane.
- Raffaele Villari, Da Messina al Tirolo, a cura di Achille Ragazzoni, "Passato Presente", Storo 1995.
- Livio Toschi, Luigi Pianciani Sindaco di Roma, Istituti editoriali e poligrafici internazionali, 1996.
- Atti del Convegno Luigi Pianciani e la democrazia moderna, Spoleto, novembre 2005.
