= Prince of Leonforte =

The Prince of Leonforte (Italian: Principe di Leonforte) is a noble title in Italy held by the House of Borghese, and previously by the families Branciforte and Lanza. The title derives its name from Leonforte, a town in Sicily. Indeed, the town gained its name from the coat of arms of the Branciforte, depicting a strong lion (Italian: Leone Forte). It was originally created in 1614, during Philip III of Spain's reign as King of Naples for Nicolò Placido Branciforte. The title remained in the family until 1812, when Stefania Branciforte married Giuseppe Lanza Prince of Trabia. The family was thereafter known as Lanza Branciforte. The title was recognized by the Kingdom of Italy after the unification of Italy. In 1927, Sofia Lanza-Branciforte, who was married to Don Giangiacomo Borghese, later Governor of Rome, was granted the title by Ministerial Decree. The title was thereafter used by her descendants, who are members of the House of Borghese.

== House of Branciforte, 1614–1812 ==
Prince	Image	Death
Nicolò Placido; 1st Prince of Leonforte; 1614–1661	Branciforte	1661
Giuseppe; 2nd Prince of Leonforte; 1661–1698	Branciforte	1698
Nicolò Placido; 3rd Prince of Leonforte; 1698–1728	Branciforte	1728
Ercole; 4th Prince of Leonforte; 1728–1780	Branciforte	1780
Giuseppe; 5th Prince of Leonforte; 1780–1806	Branciforte	1806
Nicolò Placido; 6th Prince of Leonforte; 1806–1807	Branciforte	1807
Emanuele; 7th Prince of Leonforte; 1807–1808	Branciforte	1808
Giuseppe; 8th Prince of Leonforte; 1808–1812	Branciforte	1812

== House of Lanza Branciforte, 1812–1927 ==
Prince	Image	Birth	Marriages	Death
Giuseppe; 9th Prince of Leonforte; 1812–1855	Coa fam ITA lanza	31 October 1780; Palermo, Kingdom of Naples son of Don Pietro, 7th Prince of Trabia and Anna Branciforte	Stefania Branciforte; 1805; 2 children	2 February 1855; Palermo, Kingdom of Naples aged 75
Pietro; 10th Prince of Leonforte; 1855–1855	Coa fam ITA lanza	4 August 1813; Palermo, Kingdom of Naples son of Giuseppe, 9th Prince of Leonforte, 8th Prince of Trabia and Stefania Branciforte	Sofia Galeotti; 29 June 1832; 5 children	27 June 1855; Paris, France aged 42
Giuseppe; 11th Prince of Leonforte; 1855–1868	Coa fam ITA lanza	20 June 1833; Palermo, Kingdom of Naples son of Pietro, 10th Prince of Leonforte, 9th Prince of Trabia and Sofia Galeotti	Eleonora Spinelli; 29 June 1832; 3children	27 April 1855; Munich, Kingdom of Bavaria aged 35
Pietro; 12th Prince of Leonforte; 1868–1927	Sen. Pietro Lanza, Principe di Trabia	18 August 1862; Florence, Kingdom of Italy son of Giuseppe, 11th Prince of Leonforte, 10th Prince of Trabia and Eleonora Spinelli	Giulia Florio; 6 December 1885; 5 children	16 October 1929; Palermo, Kingdom of Italy aged 96

== House of Borghese, 1927–present ==
Prince	Image	Birth	Marriages	Death
Sofia; 13th Princess of Leonforte; 1927–1984	Arms of Borghese	3 March 1896; Palermo, Kingdom of Italy daughter of Pietro, 12th Prince of Leonforte, 11th Prince of Trabia and Giulia Florio	Don Giangiacomo Borghese, Governor of Rome; 7 January 1922; 8 children	20 December 1984; Rome, Italy aged 88
Alessandro Romano; 14th Prince of Leonforte; 1984–1994	Alessandro Romano Borghese, Principe di Leonforte	9 February 1924; Palermo, Kingdom of Italy son of Don Giangiacomo and Sofia, 13th Princess of Leonforte	Fabrizia Citterio; 7 July 1962; 4 children	2 July 1994; Rome, Italy aged 70
Fabio; 15th Prince of Leonforte; 1994–	Arms of Borghese	7 June 1965; Rome, Italy son of Alessandro Romano 14th Prince of Leonforte and Fabrizia Citterio	Giacaranda Caracciolo di Melito Falck; 22 June 1996; 3 children	
