= Augusto Armellini =

Italian politician (c.1827–1912)

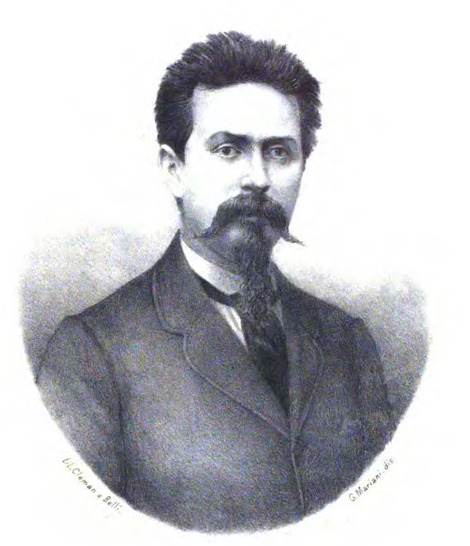
Augusto Armellini's portrait

Augusto Armellini (c. 1827 – 2 March 1912) was an Italian politician. He was the son of Carlo Armellini and his second wife, the artist Faustina Bracci. He was acting mayor of Rome from July 1880 to October 1881, and mayor of Rome, Kingdom of Italy, from 1889 to 1890. Shortly afterwards he was struck by blindness and paralysis. After a lifetime of fierce opposition to the Catholic church, he underwent a death-bed conversion before his death at the age of 86. He was buried in the Campo Verano.

Preceded by Alessandro Guiccioli	Mayor of Rome; 1889–1890	Succeeded by Onorato Caetani
