= Francesco Rospigliosi Pallavicini =

Italian politician

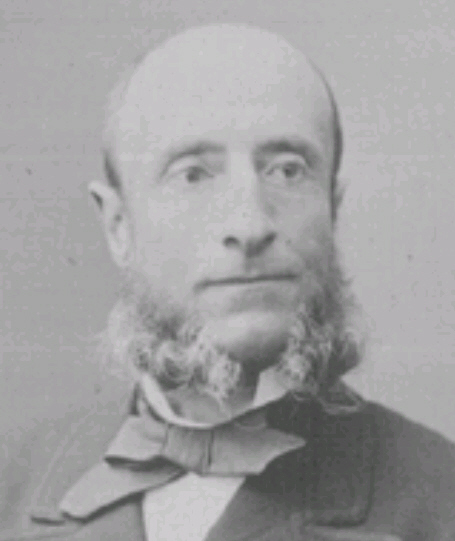

Francesco Rospigliosi Pallavicini (2 March 1828 – 14 January 1887) was an Italian politician.

== Career ==
He was born in Rome, in what was then the Papal States. He was the inaugural mayor of Rome from 1871 to 1873, after the city was annexed to the Kingdom of Italy. He served in the Senate of the Kingdom of Italy from 1870 until his death. He died in Rome.

Preceded by Giovanni Angelini (acting mayor)	Mayor of Rome; 1871–1873	Succeeded by Luigi Pianciani
