= Massimo Severo Giannini =

Italian politician and jurist

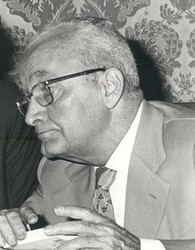

Minister for the Organization of Public Administration and for Regions
- In office 4 August 1979 – 28 September 1980
- Prime Minister: Francesco Cossiga
- Preceded by: Giovanni Del Rio (Public Administration); Tommaso Morlino (Regions)
- Succeeded by: Clelio Darida

Personal details
- Born: 8 March 1915 Rome, Italy
- Died: 24 January 2000 (aged 84) Rome, Italy
- Party: PSI
- Profession: Politician, professor

Massimo Severo Giannini (8 March 1915 – 24 January 2000) was an Italian politician and jurist. He was Minister from 1979 to 1980. He also was a member of the Accademia dei Lincei and vice president of the Higher Council for Cultural Heritage.

== Biography ==
Giannini became a professor of administrative law at the age of 24, in 1939. He taught at the universities of Sassari, Perugia, Pisa and the University of Rome La Sapienza.

During the German occupation of Rome, Giannini operated in the Matteotti Brigades, under the orders of fellow jurist Giuliano Vassalli. On 24 January 1944 he participated in the action of a group of socialist partisans who allowed the escape of Sandro Pertini and Giuseppe Saragat, together with five other socialist patriots, from the Regina Coeli prison. The action, with daring connotations, was conceived and directed by Vassalli, with the help of several partisans of the Matteotti Brigades, including Giannini, Giuseppe Gracceva, Filippo Lupis, Ugo Gala, Alfredo Monaco, and Marcella Ficca Monaco. Thus it was possible to first pass Saragat and Pertini from the German "arm" of the prison to the Italian one and therefore to produce false release orders, drawn up by Vassalli himself. The two leaders of the PSIUP were therefore released from prison along with the other socialist exponents Luigi Andreoni, Luigi Allori, Carlo Bracco, Ulisse Ducci, Torquato Lunedei.

After the War, he was Chief of Staff of the Minister for the Constituent Pietro Nenni from 12 August 1945 to 2 August 1946. From 1946 to 1948 he was head of the legislative office of the Ministry of Industry, appointed by Rodolfo Morandi. A member of the Italian Socialist Party, he moved away in 1953. He returned to the PSI a few years later, and until 1991 he was also member of the PSI National Assembly, established by Bettino Craxi in 1984.

He served as Minister of Public Administration from 1979 to 1980, in the two governments led by Francesco Cossiga.

He died on 24 January 2000 following a heart attack.
