= Giangiacomo Borghese =

Italian politician

Giangiacomo Borghese (25 July 1889 – 28 September 1954) was an Italian politician who at the height of his career served as the 6th fascist governor of Rome (1939–1944).

Giangiacomo Borghese was born in Lastra a Signa, Kingdom of Italy, the son of Prince Giuseppe Borghese, Duke of Poggio Nativo (1859–1942) and Marchioness Maria-Concetta Covoni Girolami (1865–1948), of whom the former belonged to the Roman nobility and the latter to the Florentine nobility. He graduated in engineering from the Sapienza University of Rome and later participated in the First World War as a lieutenant and later captain of the Engineers, receiving a medal for military valour. After the war, Borghese joined the Italian Nationalist Association. On 7 January 1922, he married Donna Sofia Lanza Branciforte dei principi di Trabia, from 1927 suo jure 13th Princess of Leonforte, with whom he had a son, Alessandro Romano Borghese, 14th Prince of Leonforte (1924–1994), whose own son Fabio Borghese (b. 1965) is the 15th and current Prince of Leonforte. At the end of the war, Giangiacomo Borghese retired to Palermo, Sicily, where he died in 1954.

Preceded by Piero Colonna	Governor of Rome; 1939–1944	Succeeded by Giovanni Orgera
