= Popular Rebirth =

Italian political party

Popular Rebirth (Italian: Rinascita Popolare, RP) is a minor Christian-democratic political party in Italy, led by Publio Fiori, a former right-wing Christian Democrat and, later, leading member of the National Alliance from 1994 to 2005.

It was founded in October 2006 as Christian Democratic Refoundation (Rifondazione DC, RDC) from a split of the Christian Democracy for the Autonomies.

In October 2008, along with the UDEUR, RDC launched Democratic Initiative which had the goal of uniting many centrist parties without representation in the Italian Parliament. In this they were soon joined, among others, by the Christian Democracy, the Christian Democratic Party, the Italian Democratic Socialist Party, the Italian Liberal Party and The Italian Socialists.

In 2009 Fiori promoted the constitution of the association "Popular Rebirth", with the aim of coordinating the initiatives of the Christian Democrat-inspired forces. On October 23, 2011, the national council of Popular Rebirth approved the transformation of the movement into a political party, with the intention of recomposing the Catholic archipelago into a unitary line.

In March 2010 the party joined Francesco Rutelli's Alliance for Italy.

== Leadership ==
- Secretary: Publio Fiori
- President: Clelio Darida
