= Giovanni Orgera =

Italian politician

Giovanni Orgera (14 December 1894 – 12 December 1967) was an Italian politician. He was born in Naples, Kingdom of Italy. He was podestà of Naples (1936–1943) as a member of the National Fascist Party. He was governor of Rome from January to June 1944 during the German occupation as a member of the Republican Fascist Party. He later went to Desenzano del Garda, Province of Brescia, Lombardy as a supporter of the Italian Social Republic. He died in Rome, Italy.

Preceded by Giovanni De Riseis	Podestà of Naples; 1936–1943	Succeeded by Gustavo Ingrosso
Preceded by Giangiacomo Borghese	Governor of Rome; 1944	Succeeded by Filippo Andrea VI Doria Pamphili (mayor)

== Biography ==
Born into a wealthy Neapolitan bourgeois family, he abandoned his university studies to participate in World War I, during which he rose to the rank of captain and was awarded a silver and bronze medal for military valor. In 1919, he graduated with a degree in Jurisprudence.

In January 1921, he joined the National Fascist Party and, thanks to this membership, began his administrative and party career in 1925.

In 1936, he volunteered to go to History of Ethiopia, when the Second Italo-Ethiopian War was coming to an end, and on July 11, 1936, he was appointed mayor of Naples, a position he held until August 5, 1943. In 1940, at the outbreak of war, he was called back into service on the French front with the rank of lieutenant colonel.

After the Fall of the Fascist regime in Italy, he took refuge in Abruzzo and then in Rome in December 1943. From January 6 to June 3, 1944, he was governor of Rome, appointed by the government of the Italian Social Republic.

He took refuge in Desenzano del Garda and was then appointed special commissioner of the Bank of Italy, with authority over the territory of the Italian Social Republic.

After the war, he was suspended from the bar and placed under house Lawyer pending trial. In early 1947, the bar revoked the suspension, and Orgera was able to resume his profession.
