= Onorato Caetani (1842–1917) =

Italian politician (1842–1917)

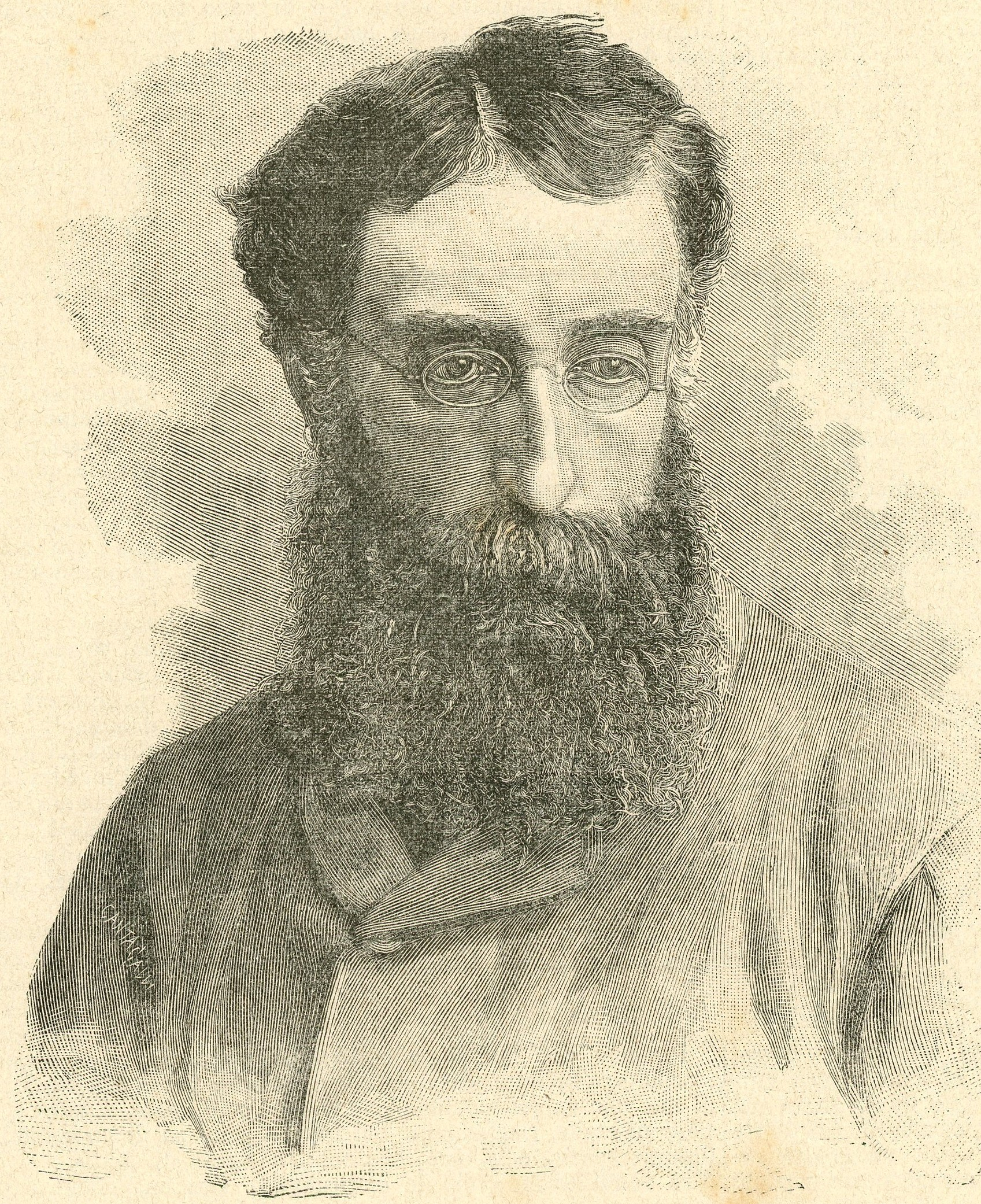
Onorato Caetani

Onorato Caetani, XIV Duke of Sermoneta and IV Prince of Teano (18 January 1842 – 2 September 1917) was an Italian politician from the noble Caetani family.

He was born in Rome, which was then part of the Papal States, to Michelangelo and Calixta Caetani (née Rzewuska). He graduated in law at the University of Rome in 1863 and lived for a long time in England.

== Political career ==
A supporter of the Historical Right party, he took a moderate position which gained the respect of both Catholics and non-Catholics.

He was elected for Velletri to the Chamber of Deputies in March 1872 and remained there uninterruptedly until 1911, when he was appointed to the Upper House as a Senator of the Kingdom of Italy. He also served as the 8th Mayor of Rome from December 1890 to November 1892, and from March to July 1896 as Minister of Foreign Affairs of the Kingdom of Italy in the Government of Rudini II.

== Italian Geographical Society ==
Caetani was elected president of the Italian Geographical Society in 1879 in succession to Cesare Correnti, the society's founder, who had been forced to resign for pursuing political objectives. He held the office until 1887, restoring the society's scientific objectives, promoting the teaching of geography in schools and organising the 3rd International Congress of Geography in Vienna in 1881.

== Honours and awards ==
- Knight Grand Cordon of the Order of Saints Maurice and Lazarus
- Commander of the Order of the Crown of Italy

== Private life ==
He died in Rome, Italy in 1917. In 1867, during his time in England, he had married Ada Constance Bootle-Wilbraham, daughter of Colonel the Hon Edward Bootle-Wilbraham (a son of Edward Bootle-Wilbraham, 1st Baron Skelmersdale). They had 6 children, 5 sons and 1 daughter:

- The Islamist Leone Caetani (1869–1935),
- The composer Roffredo Caetani (1871–1961)
- Livio Caetini (1873 -)
- Giovanella Caetini (1875 -)
- The diplomat Gelasio Caetani (1877–1934).
- Michelangelo (1890 -)

Preceded by Augusto Armellini	Mayor of Rome; 1890–1892	Succeeded by Emanuele Ruspoli
Preceded by Alberto Blanc	Minister of Foreign Affairs of the Kingdom of Italy; 1896	Succeeded by Emilio, marquis Visconti-Venosta
