= Piero Colonna =

Italian politician

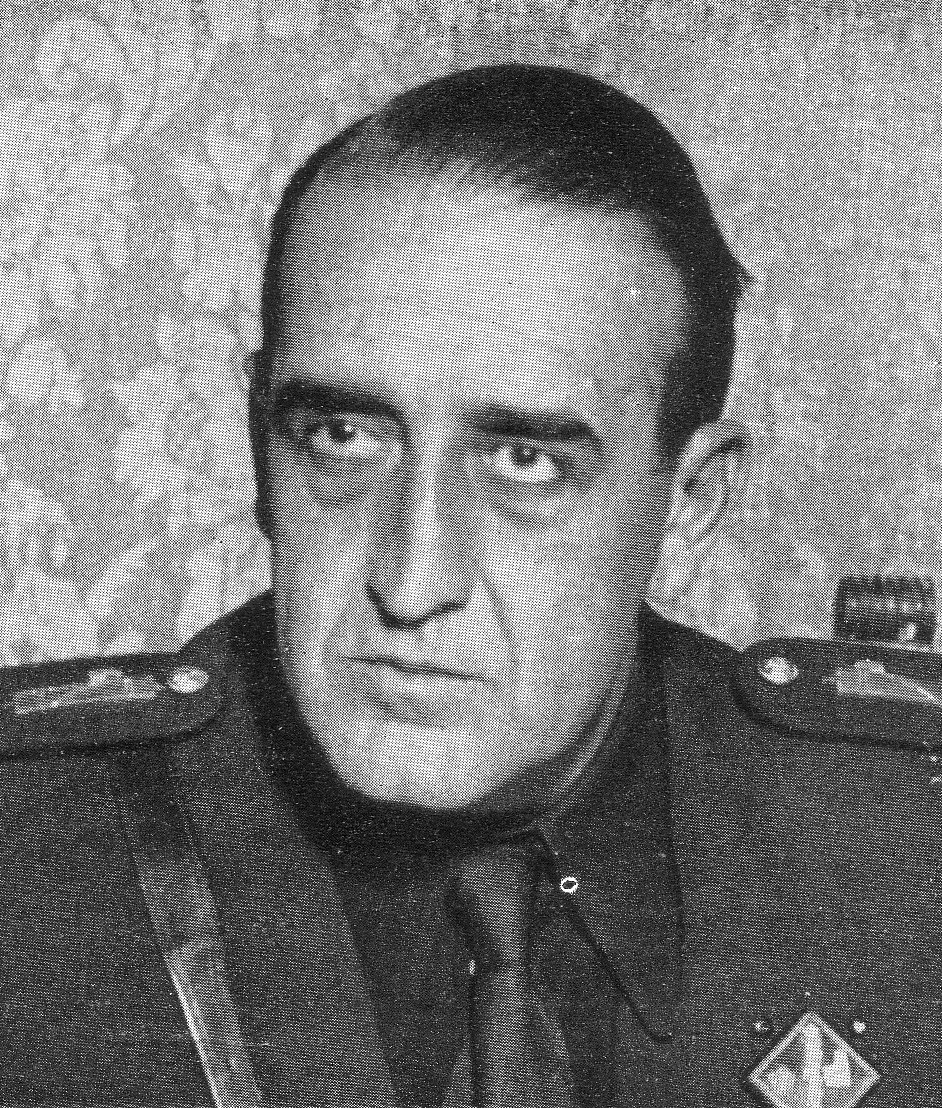
Piero Colonna

Piero Colonna (23 May 1891 – 24 August 1939) was an Italian politician. He was the son of Prospero Colonna di Paliano, who was twice mayor of Rome. He was born in Rome, Kingdom of Italy. He served as the 5th fascist governor of Rome from 16 November 1936 to 24 August 1939, dying in office.

Preceded by Giuseppe Bottai	Governor of Rome; 1936–1939	Succeeded by Giangiacomo Borghese
