= Ugo Vetere =

Italian politician (1924–2013)

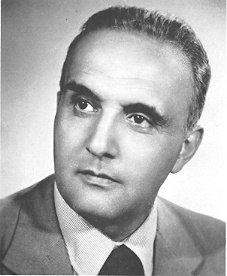
Portrait of Ugo Vetere

Ugo Vetere (23 April 1924 – 2 April 2013) was an Italian Communist Party politician. He was born in Reggio Calabria. He became mayor of Rome in 1981, after the death of his predecessor and served until 1985. He served in the Chamber of Deputies of Italy in Legislature VI, Legislature VII, Legislature VIII and in the Senate of the Republic in Legislature X.

As mayor of Rome, he signed a "peace treaty" with the mayor of modern Carthage, Chedli Klibi, in 1985 on the 2,131st anniversary of the end of the Punic Wars between ancient Rome and ancient Carthage.

Political offices
Preceded by Luigi Petroselli	Mayor of Rome; 1981–1985	Succeeded by Nicola Signorello
