= Prospero Colonna di Paliano =

Italian politician

The Honourable Prospero Colonna di Paliano SMOM
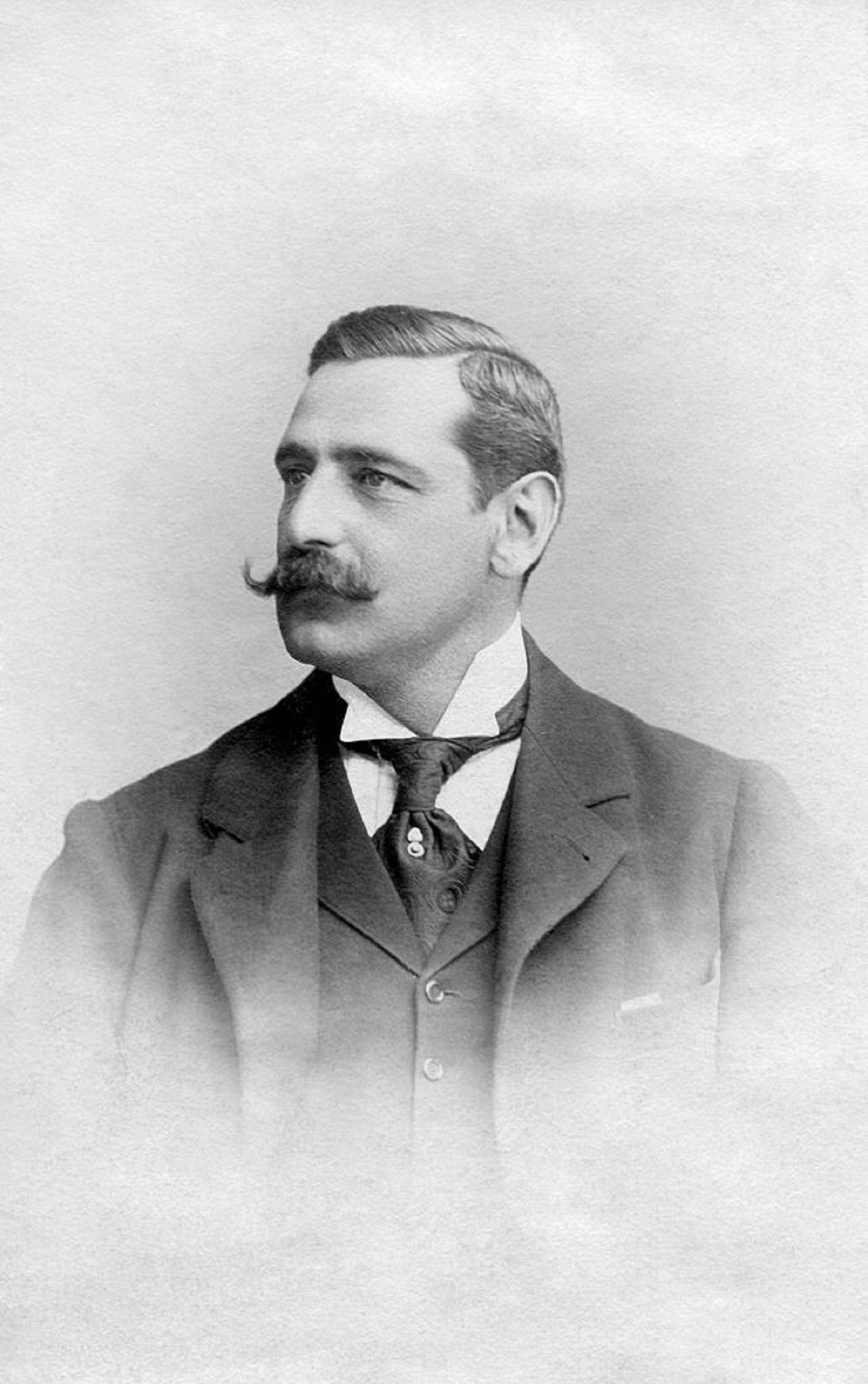
- Formal portrait, c. 1903

Mayor of Rome
- In office 6 July 1914 – 8 June 1919
- Preceded by: Ernesto Nathan
- Succeeded by: Adolfo Apolloni
- In office December 1899 – October 1904
- Preceded by: Emanuele Ruspoli
- Succeeded by: Enrico Cruciani Alibrandi

Senator of the Kingdom
- In office 16 June 1900 – 16 September 1937
- Monarch: Umberto I

Member of the Italian Chamber of Deputies
- In office 10 June 1895 – 17 May 1900
- Constituency: Anagni

Personal details
- Born: 18 July 1858 Naples, Two Sicilies
- Died: 16 September 1937 (aged 79) Rome, Italy
- Spouse: Maria Ignazia Massimo
- Children: Mario; Pietro; Fabrizio
- Profession: Landowner, military officer

Prospero Colonna, Duke of Rignano, Prince of Sonnino (18 July 1858 – 16 September 1937) was an Italian politician and aristocrat. He was twice mayor of Rome (1899–1904, 1914–1919). He served in the Chamber of Deputies and Senate of the Kingdom of Italy.

== Biography ==
Prospero was born in Naples, son of Giovanni Andrea I Colonna, a landowner, and Isabella Alvarez di Toledo. He was descended from the House of Colonna, an ancient aristocratic family.

In his youth, he married Maria Ignazia Massimo. They had 3 children: Mario, Piero (future Fascist politician) and Fabrizio.

In 1895, Colonna was elected to the Chamber of Deputies as the representative of Anagni. He supported the Historical Right. He resigned his charge in 1900. In the same year, Colonna became both a Senator and the Mayor of Rome.

During his term, Rome completed a streetcar line, including a passage under the Quirinal Hill.

In June 1904 the IOC's President Pierre de Coubertin chose Rome as the host for the IV Olympic Games, but Colonna refused due to the difficult status of the city treasury. Although he reached out to the government, the Prime Minister Giovanni Giolitti refused to help the city. Finally, Colonna resigned his office.

When the First World War started, Colonna joined in the Italian Royal Army as cavalry colonel. However, he never participated in battles, as he was appointed "military" mayor of Rome. In 1919, he resigned the office again and retired from politics. He died in 1937.

| Preceded by Emanuele Ruspoli, 1st Prince of Poggio Suasa | Mayor of Rome; 1899–1904 | Succeeded by Enrico Cruciani Alibrandi |
| Preceded by Ernesto Nathan | Mayor of Rome; 1914–1919 | Succeeded by Adolfo Apolloni |
