= Giovanni Angelini =

Italian politician

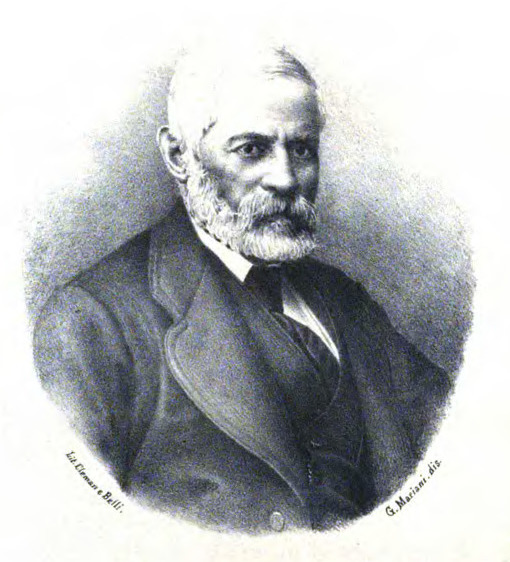

Interim Mayor of Rome
- In office March 1871 – 16 April 1871
- Monarch: Victor Emmanuel II
- Preceded by: Giuseppe Lunati
- Succeeded by: Francesco Pallavicini

Personal details
- Born: Italy
- Occupation: Politician

Giovanni Angelini was an Italian politician. He was interim Mayor of Rome from March to 16 April 1871. An architect by profession, Angelini was appointed to the provisional giunta or committee for setting up the Plebiscite, on 28 September 1870.

== Sources ==
- Alberto Caracciolo (1993). I sindaci di Roma. Rome: Donzelli Editore.
- Riccardo Fait (1873). "Giovanni Angelini". Biografie dei consiglieri comunali di Roma. Rome.

Preceded by Filippo Doria Pamphili	Acting Mayor of Rome; March – 16 April 1871	Succeeded by Francesco Rospigliosi Pallavicini
