= Sarina Nathan =

Italian patriot (1819–1882)

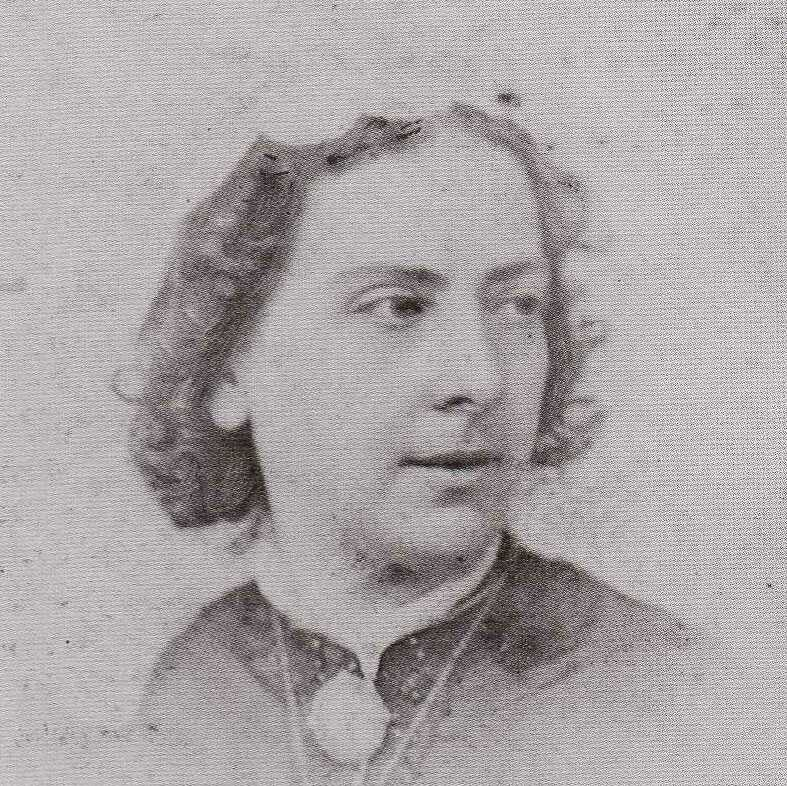
- Born: Sarina Levi; 7 December 1819; Pesaro
- Died: 19 February 1882 (aged 62); London
- Known for: support for Giuseppe Mazzini's Italy
- Spouse: Meyer Moses Nathan
- Children: 12

Sarina Nathan or Sara Levi Nathan born Sarina Levi (7 December 1819 – 19 February 1882). She was an Italian patriot, financier and confidant of Giuseppe Mazzini and a promulgator of Mazzini's ideas and works.

== Life ==
Nathan was born in Pesaro in 1819. Her parents were Ricca Rosselli and Angelo Levi. At the age of eleven, her mother died and she was entrusted to two ladies in Modena to complete her education.

To avoid her conversion to Catholicism, she was then sent by her father to her maternal relatives in Livorno, a city that allowed freedom of worship for Jews. There, she met Meyer Moses Nathan, a German-born Jewish stockbroker who lived in London. They fell in love, got married, moved to London, and became British citizens by 1837.

She met Giuseppe Mazzini in London in 1837 during his exile and was attracted by his revolutionary and anti-monarchist ideas. In 1848, she began exchanging letters with Mazzini and became his confidante. Her husband started a penny subscription scheme from his work contacts and attracted 200 subscribers. An intermediary between the two was Pellegrino Rosselli, cousin of Sara and friend of Mazzini. He would later marry her daughter.

The death of her husband in 1859 brought her a substantial inheritance which allowed her to finance Mazzini and his insurrectional activities. She returned to Italy with her daughter Janet as she needed a warmer climate.

Dissatisfied with the monarchical outcome of unification, she acted as intermediary between Mazzini and Garibaldi in the hope that the country could become a republic as Mazzini desired. In a letter written to Garibaldi on 19 August 1862, she said that "the homeland is safe if the two men whom Italy loves and esteems above all are united."

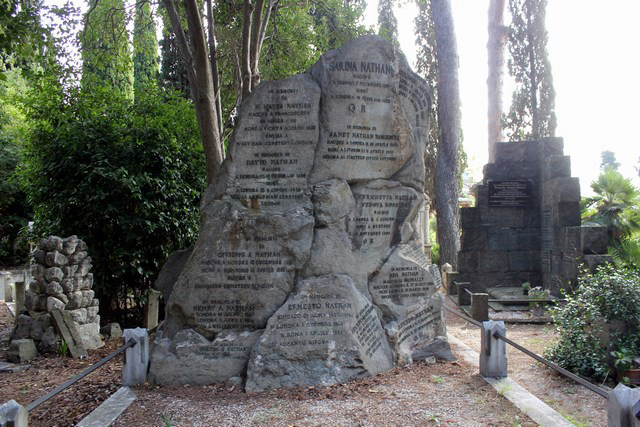
Memorial including Sarina Nathan

She was charged with conspiracy. To avoid arrest, she and her daughter fled to Lugano, where in August 1865 she bought the villa "La Tanzina" which hosted, in addition to Mazzini, other Italians such as Cattaneo, Bertani and Quadrio. Mazzini stayed in the villa until 1871, the year in which she returned to Italy under a pseudonym and moved to Pisa in the house of Janet/Giannetta Rosselli, Sara's daughter. In March 1872, Sara Levi Nathan went to the house of the Rossellis in Pisa, where Mazzini was dying. Mazzini died in the Roselli's house.

At Mazzini's funeral, Sara took care of the coffin together with Aurelio Saffi's wife. In the following months she dealt with the publication of the works and all the writings of the republican patriot, purchasing all the manuscripts and all the rights to writings and works.

In Rome, she founded the Unione Benefica, a shelter to prevent the spread of prostitution and a secular girls' school in Trastevere and for this reason the target of criticism from many Catholics.

== Life and legacy ==
Nathan died in London in 1882 after surgery. She was buried in the Cimitero del Verano in Rome where a memorial celebrates her and members of her family. In 1907, her son Ernesto Nathan was elected to be the mayor of Rome. It was noted that he was the first Jew to fulfil this role and he mentioned how his family had hosted Mazzini during his exile in London. Ernesto sued successfully when it was suggested that Mazzini was his father.

== Private life ==
She married Meyer Moses Nathan on 29 May 1836 and they had twelve children: David, Henry, Janet, Adolfo, Ernesto, Harriet, Giuseppe Nathan, Filippo, Walter, Alfredo, Ada and Beniamino. They were all born in London.
