= Alessandro Guiccioli =

Italian diplomat and politician

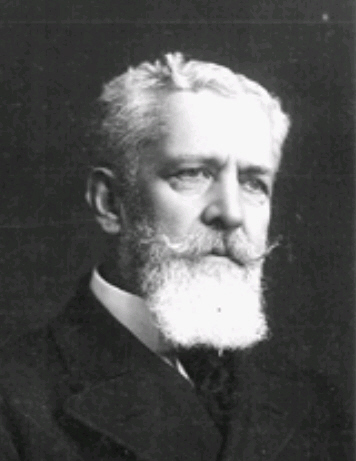
A portrait of Alessandro Guiccioli

Alessandro Guiccioli (5 March 1843 – 3 October 1922) was an Italian diplomat and politician. He was born in Venice. He was mayor of Rome from 1888 to 1889. He died in Rome, Kingdom of Italy.

Preceded by Leopoldo Torlonia	Mayor of Rome; 1888–1889	Succeeded by Augusto Armellini
