= Rinaldo Santini =

Italian politician

Rinaldo Santini (27 December 1914 – 6 July 2013) was an Italian Christian Democrat politician. He was born in Rome, Kingdom of Italy. He was mayor of Rome (1967–1969) and president of Lazio (1973–1975). He died in Rome, Italy.

Preceded by Amerigo Petrucci	Mayor of Rome; 1967–1969	Succeeded by Clelio Darida
Preceded by Luigi Cipriani	President of Lazio; 1973–1975	Succeeded by Roberto Palleschi
