= Riccardo Ventre =

Italian politician (born 1944)

Riccardo Ventre (born 20 June 1944 in Formicola) is an Italian politician and former Member of the European Parliament for Southern with the Forza Italia, part of the European People's Party who was vice-chair of the European Parliament's Committee on Constitutional Affairs.

He was a substitute for the Committee on Regional Development, a member of the Delegation for relations with the Mashreq countries and a substitute for the Delegation to the Euro-Mediterranean Parliamentary Assembly.

== See also ==
- 2004 European Parliament election in Italy
