= Salvatore Scoca =

Italian politician

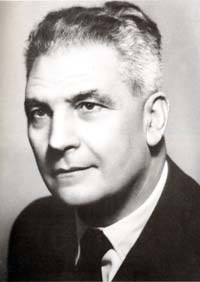
- Born: 15 June 1894; Calitri, Italy
- Died: 1 May 1962 (aged 67); Rome, Italy
- Occupation: Politician

Salvatore Scoca (15 June 1894 – 1 May 1962) was an Italian politician and academic.

Born in Calitri, he graduated in law at the Sapienza University of Rome and was professor of financial sciences, financial law and political economy in the University of Trieste and in his alma mater. In 1944 he served as Undersecretary of the Treasury in the Third Bonomi government, in 1946 he was named Undersecretary for Finance in the Second De Gasperi government, and between 1953 and 1954 he served as Minister for the Bureaucratic Reform in the Pella government.

He was Deputy for Christian Democracy from 1948 to 1958, before leaving politics due to incompatibility with his being a member of the Avvocatura dello Stato.
