= Umberto Tupini =

Italian politician (1889–1973)

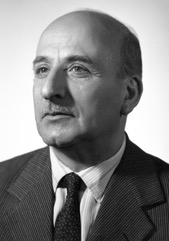

Minister of Grace and Justice
- In office 1944–1945
- Prime Minister: Ivanoe Bonomi
- Preceded by: Vincenzo Arangio-Ruiz
- Succeeded by: Palmiro Togliatti

Minister of Public Works
- In office 1947–1950
- Prime Minister: Alcide De Gasperi
- Preceded by: Emilio Sereni
- Succeeded by: Salvatore Aldisio

Minister for Public Administration Reform
- In office 1954–1955
- Prime Minister: Amintore Fanfani; Mario Scelba
- Preceded by: Salvatore Scoca
- Succeeded by: Guido Gonella

Mayor of Rome
- In office 1956–1958
- Preceded by: Salvatore Rebecchini
- Succeeded by: Urbano Cioccetti

Minister of Tourism and Entertainment
- In office 1959–1960
- Prime Minister: Antonio Segni; Fernando Tambroni
- Preceded by: Salvatore Scoca
- Succeeded by: Alberto Folchi

Personal details
- Born: May 27, 1889 Rome, Italy
- Died: January 7, 1973 (aged 83) Rome, Italy
- Party: Christian Democracy
- Profession: Politician, lawyer

Umberto Tupini (27 May 1889 – 7 January 1973) was an Italian politician. He was minister of public works (1947–1950) in the Government of Italy. He was the mayor of Rome (1956–1958). He served in the Senate of Italy in Legislature I (1948–1953), Legislature II (1953–1958), Legislature III (1958–1963) and Legislature IV (1963–1968). He was a knight grand cross of the Order of Merit of the Italian Republic.

== Biography ==
Born in Rome to parents from the Marche, Umberto Tupini was Minister of Grace and Justice in the Bonomi II Cabinet (1944) and in the Bonomi III Cabinet (1944–1945). He was elected to the Constituent Assembly in 1946 among the ranks of the Christian Democracy Within the party he joined the De Gasperi's faction, which then took the name of "Popular politics". Elected Senator for the first time in 1948, he was re-elected also in 1953, 1958 and 1963. He was Minister of Public Works in the De Gasperi IV Cabinet (1947–1948) and in the De Gasperi V Cabinet (1948–1950); He served also as Minister without portfolio for the reform of Public Administration in the Fanfani I Cabinet (1954) and in the Scelba Cabinet (1954–1955).

He was Mayor of Rome from 2 July 1956 to 10 January 1958, chairing a centrist junta made up of Christian Democrats, liberals and Social Democrats. He was on the Board of Directors of AS Roma football team between 1959 and 1962.

After the experience of municipal administrator, Tupini was Minister of Tourism, sport and entertainment in the Segni II Cabinet (1959–1960) and in the Tambroni Cabinet (1960). His appointment was preparatory to the organization of the Rome Olympics, set in August 1960. On 15 June 1960 he announced that the censorship against all films with "scandalous, negative subjects for the formation of Italian civil conscience" would be drastic, referring to La dolce vita by Federico Fellini.
