= Publio Fiori =

Italian politician (1938–2024)

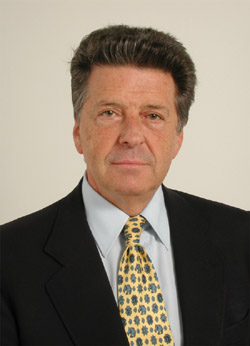
Publio Fiori

Publio Fiori (25 March 1938 – 16 July 2024) was an Italian politician. He was born in Rome and graduated in law. He became a member of Christian Democracy, to which he belonged for much of his political career.

In 1977, a commando of Brigate Rosse (communist terrorists) shot him in the legs and thorax. Fiori is often included in the list of those belonging to Propaganda Due (P2), a Masonic lodge operating illegally (in contravention of the Italian constitution banning secret lodges, and membership of government officials in secret membership organizations) from 1976 to 1981. In 2001, however, the Court of Rome ruled out his membership of P2.

On 1 July 1992, he became undersecretary at the Ministry of Post and Telecommunications in the Giuliano Amato cabinet, while on 6 May 1993, he was appointed undersecretary at the Ministry of Public Health. In 1993, the Christian Democracy, then being wiped out by the Tangentopoli corruption scandal, opened an alliance with the post-communist Democratic Party of the Left. Fiori, traditionally tied to the right wing of DC, abandoned the party.

In 1995, he was one of the founders of the National Alliance (AN), collecting most of the members of the former post-fascist Italian Social Movement. He was Minister of Transportation in the first Silvio Berlusconi cabinet. Fiori abandoned AN in 2005, dissenting with some lay-oriented moves of secretary Gianfranco Fini, and moved to Christian Democracy for Autonomies, of which he was named president. In July 2006, he was expelled from this movement with accusations of having organized an illegal national congress.

On 1 October 2006, Fiori founded with Clelio Darida the Christian Democratic Refoundation party, of which he was appointed national secretary. On 23 March 2010, Fiori formed an alliance with Francesco Rutelli's Alliance for Italy.

Fiori died in Rome on 16 July 2024, at the age of 86.
