= Filippo Doria Pamphili =

Italian politician (1813–1876)

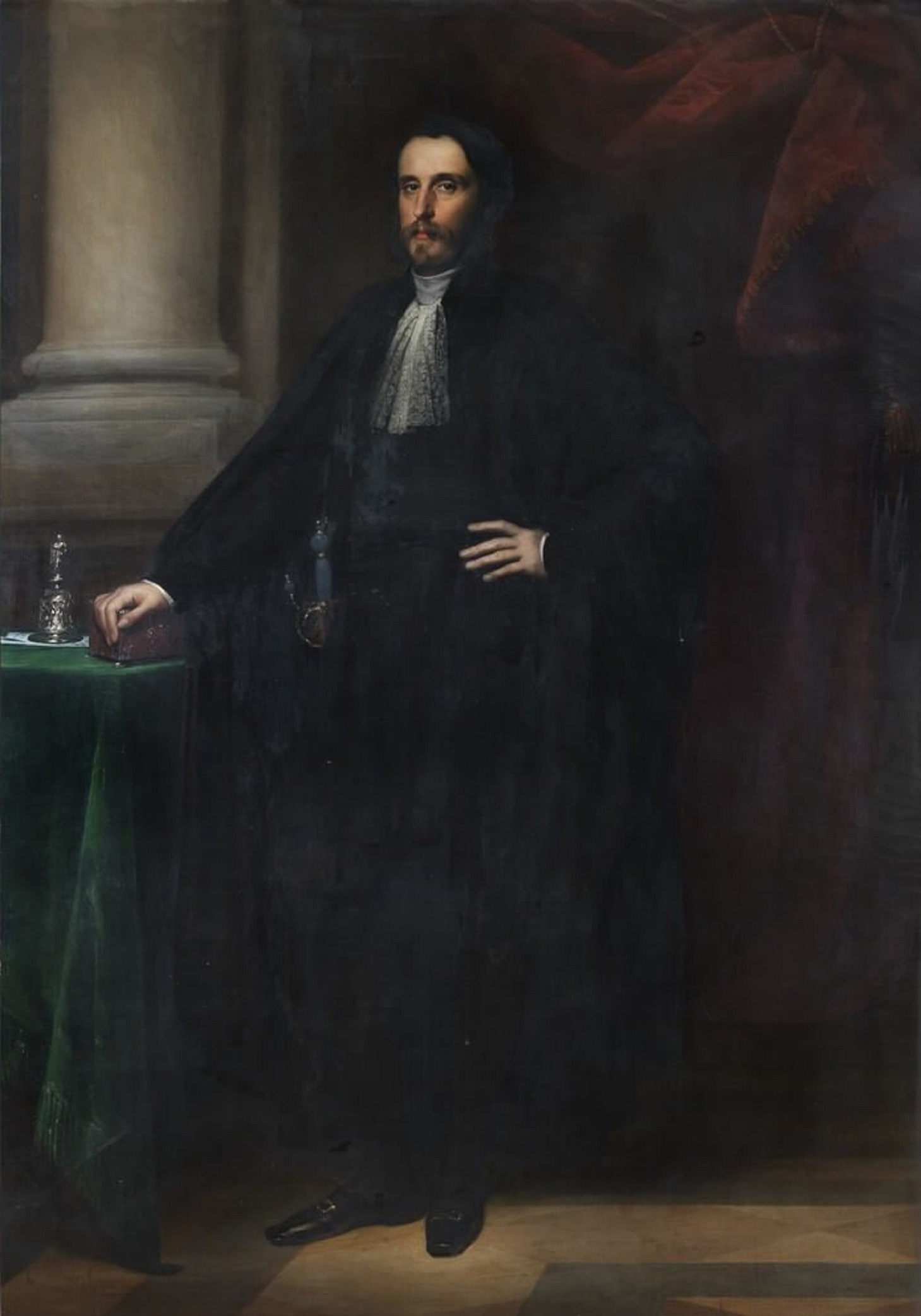
Filippo Doria Pamphili

Filippo Andrea V Doria Pamphili (29 September 1813 – 19 March 1876) was an Italian politician. He was born in Rome, the son of Luigi Giovanni Andrea Dorea Pamphili and Teresa Orsini di Gravina. He was a recipient of the Order of Saints Maurice and Lazarus and the Order of the Crown of Italy.

== Biography ==
=== Childhood and Rise ===
He was the son of Prince Luigi Giovanni Andrea (1779 - 1838) and Teresa Orsini di Gravina (1788 - 1829), founder of the religious order of the Sisters Hospitalers of Mercy, already declared "Servant of God" (the process for her beatification is currently ongoing). After his father's death, he became the "Prince of Melfi and of the Holy Roman Empire, Duke and Marquis."

=== Marriage ===
The Prince married Maria Alathea Talbot, with whom he had six children.

=== Political career ===
As Minister of Arms of the Pontifical State, between May 4 and July 22, 1848, he served as municipal assessor in Rome for "urban police, municipal guards, vigilantes, and the national guard". From December 1870 to March 1871, he led Rome as the acting Mayor.

In December 1870, he was appointed Senator of the Kingdom in category 21 of the Albertine Statute.

=== Death ===
The Prince of Melfi died in Rome on March 19, 1876.

== Descendants ==
Prince Filippo Andrea V and Maria Alathea Talbot had six children:

- Teresa, who married Duke Emilio Massimo;
- Giovanni Andrea
- Alfonso
- Guendalina, who married Count Gian Luca Cavazzi della Somaglia;
- Olimpia, who married Prince Fabrizio Colonna Avella.

== Ancestry ==
Andrea Doria Landi, Marquess of Torriglia
Giovanni Andrea Doria Landi, 8th Prince of Melfi
Livia Centurione
Andrea Doria Landi Pamphili, 9th Prince of Melfi
Ettore Carafa della Stadera, 11th Duke of Andria
Eleonora Carafa della Stadera
Francesca de Guevara
Luigi Doria Landi Pamphili, 10th Prince of Melfi
Vittorio Amedeo I of Savoy-Carignano, Prince of Carignano
Luigi Vittorio of Savoy-Carignano, Prince of Carignano
Maria Vittoria Francesca of Savoy
Leopoldina of Savoy-Carignano
Ernst Leopold of Hesse-Rheinfels-Rotenburg, Landgrave of Hesse-Rotenburg
Christina Henriette of Hesse-Rheinfels-Rotenburg
Eleonore Maria Anna of Löwenstein-Wertheim-Rochefort
Filippo Andrea Doria Landi Pamphili, 11th Prince of Melfi
Domenico Orsini, 6th Prince of Solofra
Filippo Bernualdo Orsini, 7th Prince of Solofra
Anna Paola Flaminia Odescalchi
Domenico Orsini
Marino Francesco Caracciolo, 7th Prince of Avellino
Maria Teresa Caracciolo
Maria Antonia Carafa
Teresa Orsini
Nicola Caracciolo, Duke of Lavello
Giuseppe Caracciolo, 6th Prince of Torella
Faustina de Cardenas
Faustina Caracciolo
Giuseppe Baccher Cartillar
Beatrice de Mendoza y Alarcon, 11th Marchioness of Valle Siciliana
Emanuela de Mendoza y Alarcon, 10th Marchioness of Valle Siciliana

Preceded by Giuseppe Lunati	Acting Mayor of Rome; 21 December 1870 – March 1871	Succeeded by Giovanni Angelini
