= Glauco Della Porta =

Italian politician (1920–1976)

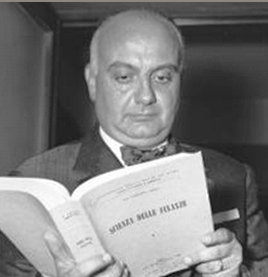
Glauco Della Porta

Glauco Della Porta (7 August 1920 – 6 May 1976) was an Italian politician and economist. He was born in Naples, Kingdom of Italy. He was mayor of Rome (1962–1964). He died in Rome, Italy.

== Honors ==
- Knight Grand Cross of the Order of Merit of the Italian Republic – Rome, 18 August 1964
- Grand Officer of the Order of Merit of the Italian Republic – Rome, 27 December 1962

Preceded by Urbano Cioccetti	Mayor of Rome; 1962–1964	Succeeded by Amerigo Petrucci
