= Luigi Petroselli =

Italian politician

Luigi Petroselli (1 March 1932 – 7 October 1981) was an Italian politician who served as mayor of Rome from 1979 until his death in 1981. He was born in Viterbo. He represented the Italian Communist Party.

Political offices
Preceded by Giulio Carlo Argan	Mayor of Rome; 1979–1981	Succeeded by Ugo Vetere
