= Giulio Carlo Argan =

Italian politician and art historian

Giulio Carlo Argan OMRI
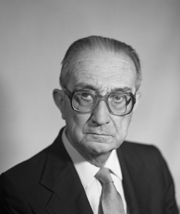

Member of the Senate of the Republic
- In office 12 July 1983 – 22 April 1992
- Constituency: Rome (1983–87); Tivoli (1987–92)

Mayor of Rome
- In office 9 August 1976 – 29 September 1979
- Preceded by: Clelio Darida
- Succeeded by: Luigi Petroselli

Personal details
- Born: 17 May 1909 Turin, Italy
- Died: 12 November 1992 (aged 83) Rome, Italy
- Party: Independent Left (1976–1992)
- Other political affiliations: National Fascist Party (1928–1943)
- Spouse: Anna Maria Mazzucchelli (m. 1939)
- Education: University of Turin
- Profession: Art historian, art critic, teacher

Giulio Carlo Argan (17 May 1909 – 12 November 1992) was an Italian art historian, critic and politician.

== Biography ==
Argan was born in Turin and studied in the University of Turin, graduating in 1931. In 1928 he entered the National Fascist Party. In the 1930 he worked for the National Antiquity and Arts Directorate, first in Turin and then in Modena and Rome, where he collaborated to the creation of the Istituto Superiore per la Conservazione ed il Restauro and directed the magazine Le Arti. His career was boosted by his friendship with the Fascist leader Cesare Maria De Vecchi, then national Minister of Education.

In 1938 he published a manual of art for high schools, while in the 1940s he collaborated to the magazine Primato, founded and directed by Giuseppe Bottai, another Fascist gerarca. After World War II, he taught in universities Palermo and, from 1959, in Rome. Argan co-founded the publishing house Il Saggiatore and he was a member of the Superior Council of Antiquities and Fine Arts (predecessor of the Ministry of Culture), in which he remained until 1974. In 1968 he published his most famous work, Storia dell'Arte Italiana (History of Italian Art). In 1973 he founded the Rome ISIA, Italy's oldest institution in the field of industrial design.

He was the first Communist mayor of Rome, between 1976 and 1979. He was elected a Foreign Honorary Member of the American Academy of Arts and Sciences in 1992. He died in Rome.

== Selected works ==
- Fra Angelico: Biographical and Critical Study, The Taste of Our Time Vol. 10 (1955) Editions d'Art Albert Skira, Geneva, 127 pp.
- Studi e note (1955)
- Botticelli: Biographical and Critical Study, The Taste of Our Time Vol. 19 (1957) Editions d'Art Albert Skira, Geneva, 147 pp.
- Salvezza e caduta nell’arte moderna (1964)
- Europe of the Capitals 1600–1700., Art, Ideas, History (1964) Editions d'Art Albert Skira, Geneva, 236 pp.
- Progetto e destino (1965)
- Storia dell'arte italiana (1968)
- Storia dell’arte come storia della città (1983)
- Da Hogarth a Picasso (1983)
- Forma Naturae (Archetipi & C.) for Antonio Papasso (1983)
- Classico Anticlassico (1984)
- Immagine e persuasione (1986)
- Progetto e oggetto (2003)
