= Filippo Andrea VI Doria Pamphili =

Italian politician and nobleman (1886–1958)

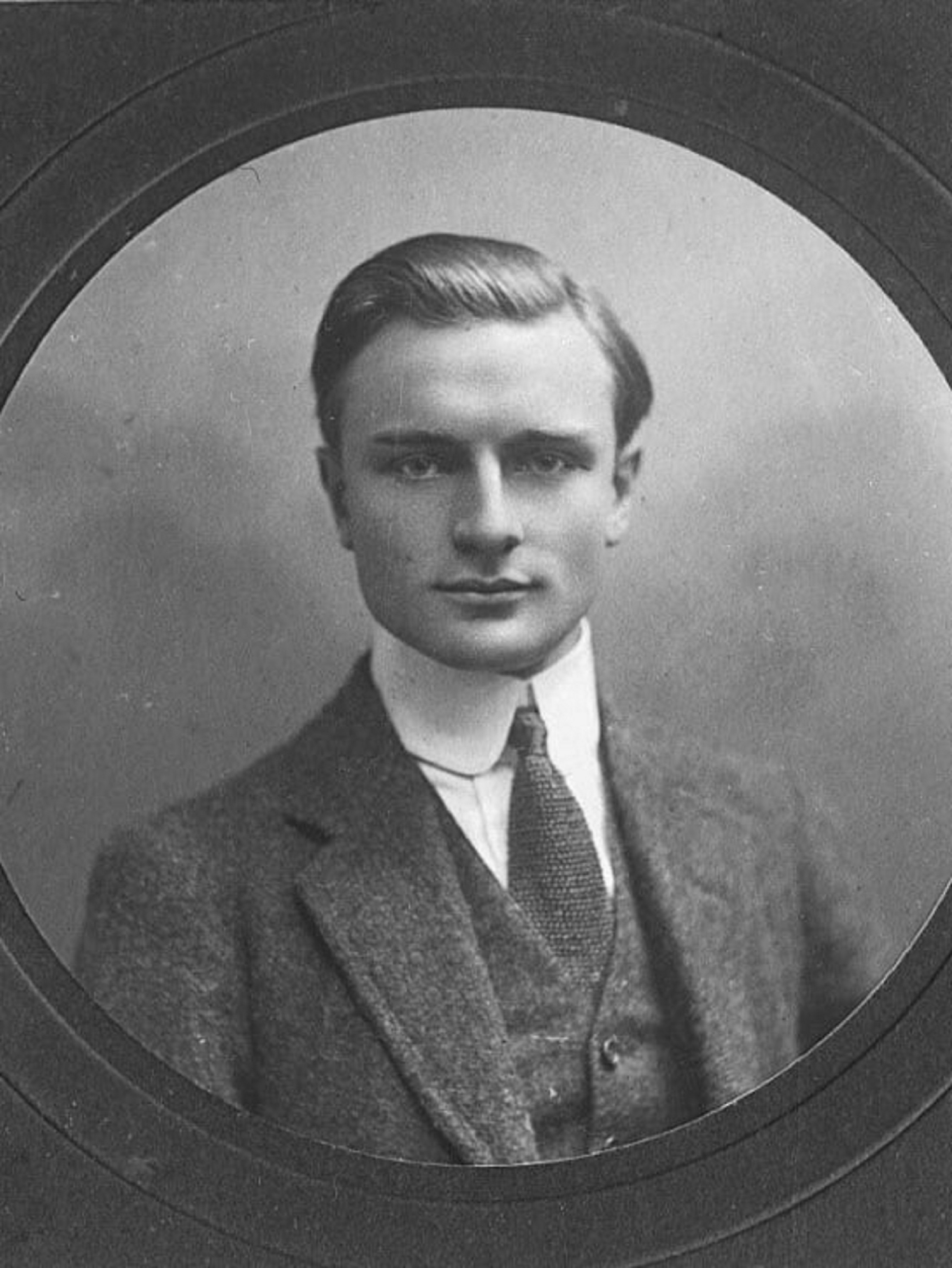
- Born: 1 March 1886
- Died: 3 February 1958 (aged 71)
- Spouse: Gesine Mary Dykes (m. 1921)

Prince Filippo Andrea Doria Pamphili Landi (1 March 1886 – 3 February 1958) was an Italian politician and nobleman, who succeeded his father as the 13th Prince of Melfi in 1914.

== Life ==
The only surviving son of Prince Alfonso Doria Pamphili, a Senator of Italy, and Lady Emily Pelham-Clinton, his grandfather also married an English aristocrat, Lady Mary Talbot, whom he met at Queen Victoria's coronation.

Prince Filippo was the first Mayor of Rome elected after World War II, and its last mayor under the Kingdom of Italy.

In 1921, he married Gesine Mary Dykes, OStJ, a Scottish nurse who had brought him back to health after he had been injured in a sculling accident while at Cambridge.

Known as an opposer of the Fascist regime, he became mayor of Rome in June 1944. During the German occupation of Rome in 1943-1944, Prince Filippo and his family had to go into hiding, because his opposition to the Nazis was well known and the Gestapo raided his homes in Rome and surveilled his associates. While in hiding, the half-English prince continued to donate large sums to the escape organization run by Hugh O'Flaherty, an Irish Catholic priest in the Vatican who found hiding places in Rome and the Italian countryside for over 6,000 escaped Allied POWs and Jews, saving their lives. He was imprisoned in the Pisticci concentration camp, being liberated in an SAS action on September 14, 1943.

His wife predeceased him in 1955 and Filippo died in Rome on 3 February 1958. Their child, Princess Orietta, succeeded him as the 14th and last holder of the family's princely title.

== See also ==
- Doria-Pamphili-Landi
- Princes of the Holy Roman Empire

Italian nobility
Preceded by Prince Alfonso Doria Pamphili Landi	Prince of Melfi; 1914–1958	Succeeded by Princess Orietta Doria Pamphili Landi
Government offices
Preceded by Giovanni Orgera (Governor)	Mayor of Rome; 1944–1946	Succeeded by Salvatore Rebecchini
