= Giovan Battista Adonnino =

Italian politician (1889–1973)

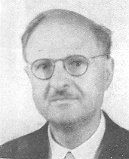
Giovan Battista Adonnino

Giovan Battista Adonnino (6 November 1889, Licata - 14 December 1973) was an Italian politician belonging to the Christian Democracy. He was elected member of the Constituent Assembly of Italy and of the Chamber of Deputies.
