= Filippo Cremonesi =

Italian banker and politician

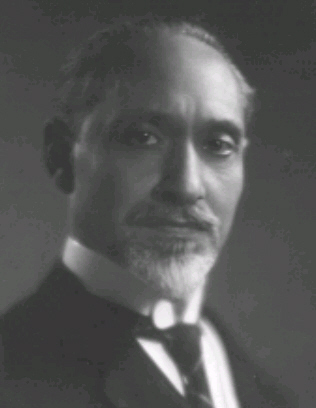
Mayor Filippo Cremonesi

Filippo Cremonesi (22 August 1872 – 19 May 1942) was an Italian banker and politician. He was born in Rome, Kingdom of Italy. He was mayor of Rome from 1922 to 1926 and the first Fascist Governor of Rome in 1926. He was a recipient of the Order of Saints Maurice and Lazarus.

In 1928 Cremonesi was appointed by Mussolini as the president of the Italian Red Cross, bringing the organization in line with fascism. He died in Rome, Italy.

== Biography ==
He was born in Rome in 1872 into a well-to-do middle-class family; his parents were Giovanni Battista Cremonesi and Maddalena Foglietti. He had two brothers, Luigi and Carlo, and a sister, Elvira. At a young age, he emigrated to South America and settled in Chile, where he was involved in various commercial and financial activities for about ten years. Even after returning to his homeland, he continued to work in the financial sector, serving as an advisor to several credit institutions and the Rome Camera di commercio, industria, artigianato e agricoltura. In 1916, he founded the banking firm Cavalsassi e Cremonesi.

| Preceded by Giannetto Valli | Mayor of Rome; 1922–1926 | Succeeded by Ludovico Spada Veralli Potenziani (Governor of Rome) |
