= Salvatore Rebecchini =

Italian Christian Democrat politician

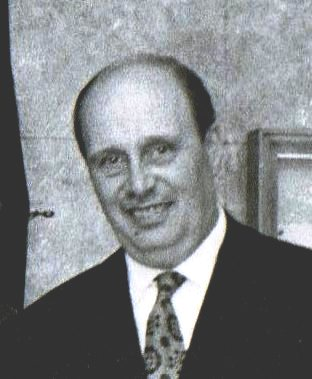
Salvatore Rebecchini, 1953

Salvatore Rebecchini (21 February 1891 – 22 November 1977) was an Italian politician who served as mayor of Rome from 1946 to 1956. He was born in Rome, Kingdom of Italy. He was the 1st mayor of Rome under the Republic. He died in Rome, Italy.

Government offices
Preceded by Filippo Andrea VI Doria Pamphili	Mayor of Rome; 1946–1956	Succeeded by Umberto Tupini
