= Giannetto Valli =

Italian politician

Giannetto Valli (1869–1927) was an Italian politician. He was mayor of Rome, Kingdom of Italy (1921–1922).

== See also ==
· · ·

Government offices
Preceded by Luigi Rava	Mayor of Rome; 1921–1922	Succeeded by Filippo Cremonesi
