= Carlo Cremaschi =

Italian footballer (born 1992)

Personal information
- Date of birth: 27 January 1992 (age 34)
- Place of birth: Bergamo, Italy
- Position: Defender

Team information
- Current team: S.S. Tritium 1908

Senior career*
| Years | Team | Apps | (Gls) |
| 2011– | S.S. Tritium 1908 | 17 | (0) |
- * Club domestic league appearances and goals as of 9 october 2012

Carlo Cremaschi (born 27 January 1992) is an Italian football defender who played for S.S. Tritium 1908

== Domestic League Records ==
| Year | Competition | Apps | Goal |
|---|---|---|---|
| 2011- | Serie C1 | 6 | 0 |
| Total | | 17 | 0 |
