= Clelio Darida =

Italian politician (1927–2017)

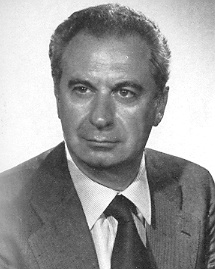

Mayor of Rome
- In office 30 July 1969 – 9 August 1976
- Preceded by: Rinaldo Santini
- Succeeded by: Giulio Carlo Argan
Ministerial offices
Minister of State Holdings
In office 4 August 1983 – 29 July 1987
Prime Minister	Bettino Craxi; Amintore Fanfani
Preceded by	Gianni De Michelis
Succeeded by	Luigi Granelli
Minister of Justice
In office 23 May 1981 – 4 August 1983
Prime Minister	Arnaldo Forlani; Giovanni Spadolini; Amintore Fanfani
Preceded by	Adolfo Sarti
Succeeded by	Mino Martinazzoli
Minister for Public Administration
In office 18 October 1980 – 23 May 1981
Prime Minister	Arnaldo Forlani
Preceded by	Massimo Severo Giannini
Succeeded by	Dante Schietroma
Minister of Post and Telecommunications
In office 4 August 1980 – 18 October 1980
Prime Minister	Francesco Cossiga
Preceded by	Vittorino Colombo
Succeeded by	Michele Di Giesi
Minister for Parliamentary Relations
In office 5 August 1979 – 4 April 1980
Prime Minister	Francesco Cossiga
Preceded by	Adolfo Sarti
Succeeded by	Remo Gaspari
Parliamentary offices
Member of the Chamber of Deputies
In office 5 July 1976 – 22 April 1992
In office 16 May 1963 – 21 October 1970
Constituency	Rome–Viterbo–Latina–Frosinone

Personal details
- Born: 3 May 1927 Rome, Kingdom of Italy
- Died: 11 May 2017 (aged 90) Rome, Italy
- Party: Christian Democracy

Clelio Darida (3 May 1927 – 11 May 2017) was an Italian politician. He was mayor of Rome and minister of the Italian Republic.

== Biography ==
Darida was born in Rome in 1927.

Starting from June 1960, he was member of Rome's municipal council for his party, Christian Democracy (DC). Within the DC, he was a member of the faction of Amintore Fanfani first, and Arnaldo Forlani later. He was elected mayor of Rome on 30 July 1969, being confirmed on 17 March 1972. In 1974 he formed a city council including only DC member, with indirect support by the councillors of the Italian Communist Party.

In 1976 he resigned as mayor to participate in the 1976 general elections. He was elected in the Chamber of Deputies, being confirmed until 1992, when he was not re-elected.

Darida served as Undersecretary at the Ministry of the Interior from 1976 to 1980, and, from 1980 to 1987, he served as Minister for the Parliamentary Relations, as Minister of Post and Telecommunications, as Minister of Public Function, as Minister of Justice and as Minister of State Holdings.

During the Tangentopoli corruption scandal in the early 1990s, he was accused of bribery and imprisoned for a short period in San Vittore Prison. Later he was acquitted of all accusations and obtained from the Ministry of the Treasury a compensation of ₤100 million.

In 2006 Darida participated with Publio Fiori in the constitution of a new political movement of Christian inspiration, the Christian Democratic Refoundation, of which he was appointed President of the National Council.

In 2012 Darida accepted the invitation of several former Christian Democrat national councilors in office in 1993 and convened the National Council of Christian Democracy, after the Court of Cassation acknowledged that this party had never been dissolved, since the National Council that sanctioned the birth of the Italian People's Party in 1994 also didn't have the power to deliberate dissolution of the DC. On 30 March 2012 Darida proceeded, together with 48 other members, the self-convocation of the DC National Council, electing the new National Directorate. Gianni Fontana was appointed secretary of the reborn Christian Democracy, Silvio Lega was appointed president of the National Council, while Clelio Darida was appointed honorary president of the party.

A few months after having contributed personally to the reconvening of the 1993 DC National Council, Darida abandoned the Christian Democracy led by Fontana to join the Christian Democracy led by Angelo Sandri, of which he became honorary president.

Darida died in Rome on 11 May 2017.

== Electoral history ==
Election	House	Constituency	Party	Votes	Result
1963	Chamber of Deputies	Rome–Viterbo–Latina–Frosinone	DC	46,391	Elected
1968	Chamber of Deputies	Rome–Viterbo–Latina–Frosinone	DC	57,446	Elected
1976	Chamber of Deputies	Rome–Viterbo–Latina–Frosinone	DC	74,855	Elected
1979	Chamber of Deputies	Rome–Viterbo–Latina–Frosinone	DC	59,468	Elected
1983	Chamber of Deputies	Rome–Viterbo–Latina–Frosinone	DC	106,377	Elected
1987	Chamber of Deputies	Rome–Viterbo–Latina–Frosinone	DC	118,292	Elected
1992	Chamber of Deputies	Rome–Viterbo–Latina–Frosinone	DC	10,983	Not elected
