= Franco Evangelisti (politician) =

Italian politician (1923–1993)

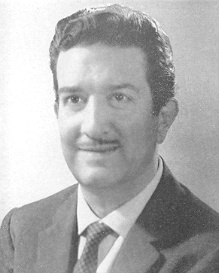

Member of the Senate of the Republic
- In office 11 July 1983 – 23 April 1992
- Constituency: Rome

Minister of the Merchant Marine
- In office 4 August 1979 – 4 March 1980
- Prime Minister: Giuseppe Cossiga
- Preceded by: Luigi Preti
- Succeeded by: Nicola Signorello

Member of the Chamber of Deputies
- In office 16 May 1963 – 11 July 1983
- Constituency: Rome

Personal details
- Born: 10 February 1923 Alatri, Lazio, Italy
- Died: 11 November 1993 (aged 70) Rome, Italy
- Party: Christian Democracy
- Education: Sapienza
- Profession: Manager

Franco Evangelisti (10 February 1923 – 11 November 1993) was an Italian politician, a member of Democrazia Cristiana (DC) and a long-standing follower of Giulio Andreotti.

== Career ==
A native of Alatri and a journalist by profession, Evangelisti was elected to the Italian Chamber of Deputies for Democrazia Cristiana from 1963 to 1987, and then to the Italian Senate until 1992. He was appointed as undersecretary for Tourism and Spectacles in the second cabinet led by Mariano Rumor (1968), keeping the position in the following ones, again under Rumor and then under Emilio Colombo (1970–1972). He was undersecretary for the Presidency under the cabinets led by Giulio Andreotti, with functions as secretary since 1976.

From 1979 to 1980 he was Minister for the Merchant Marine: on 4 March 1980 he resigned, after an interview to the newspaper La Repubblica in which he declared to have received money by the entrepreneur Gaetano Caltagirone.

Just before his death, caused by a cerebral hemorrhage in 1993, Evangelisti described to a journalist the alleged secret meeting between Andreotti and general Carlo Alberto Dalla Chiesa, who was assassinated in 1982. During the meeting, Dalla Chiesa showed Andreotti a memorial of Aldo Moro (the president of DC who was kidnapped and killed by communist terrorists in 1979) containing dangerous revelations against Andreotti.

Evangelisti, together with Andreotti, was involved in several scandals. During the Lockheed scandal, he was accused of receiving money by the former chairman of Finmeccanica, and his name (together with that of Andreotti) was connected to the assassination of Michele Sindona, a banker condemned for bankrupt and murder, who was linked to Licio Gelli's secret masonic lodge Propaganda 2.

Evangelisti was also president of the football team AS Roma from 1965, and the chairman of Italian Boxing Federation from 1969 to 1973.
