= Urbano Cioccetti =

Italian politician (1905–1978)

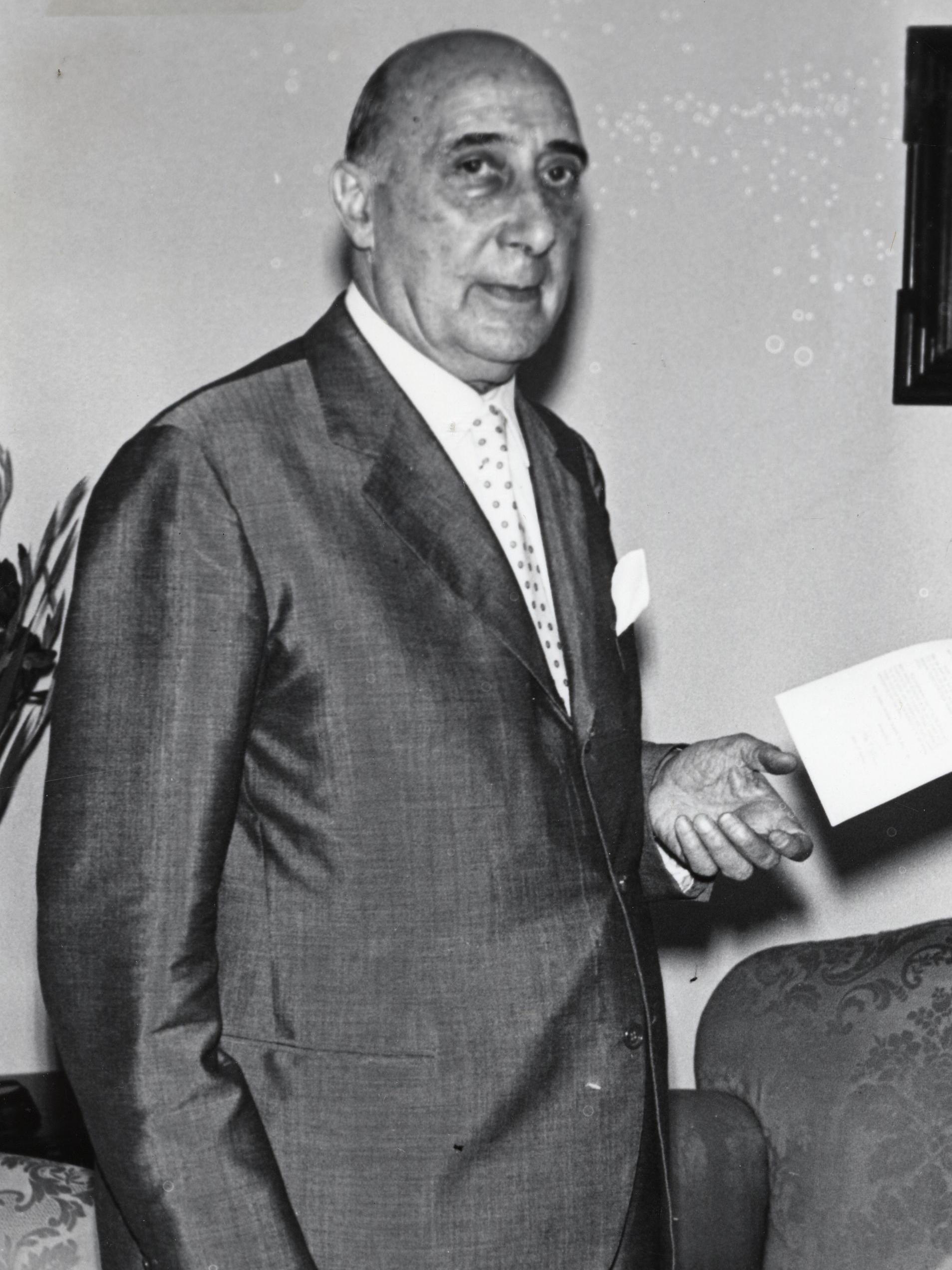
Urbano Cioccetti (1960)

Urbano Cioccetti (26 November 1905 – 9 May 1978) was an Italian Christian Democrat politician. He was mayor of Rome (1958–1961). He died in Rome, Italy.

Preceded by Umberto Tupini	Mayor of Rome; 1958–1962	Succeeded by Glauco Della Porta
