= Enrico Cruciani Alibrandi =

Italian politician and mayor

Enrico Cruciani Alibrandi (9 July 1839 – 8 November 1921) was an Italian politician who served as senator and mayor of Rome.

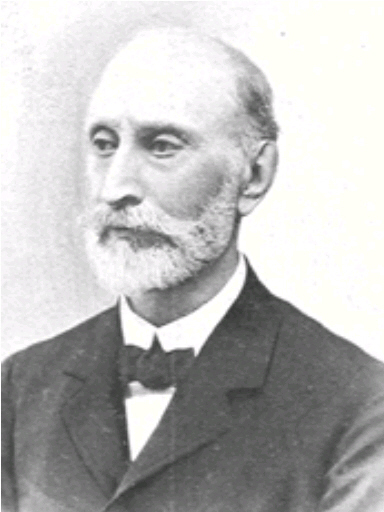

== Early life ==
Alibrandi was born in Rome, in what was then the Papal States. He obtained an Engineer degree from the Scuola d'applicazione per gli ingegneri, in his native city.

== Politics ==
After the 1870 capture of Rome by the Italian Army, commanded by Raffaele Cadorna, Alibrandi became a member of the provisional government council. Following Italy's unification, he served as Rome city councilor for public education and as acting mayor between December 1904 and 10 July 1905, whereupon he was appointed mayor of Rome. He served as mayor until 10 July 1907, remaining thereafter on the city council until 1914, while also serving on the Italian Senate where he was elected on 21 January 1906.

He died in 1921 in Rome.

Preceded by Prospero Colonna di Paliano	Mayor of Rome; 1905–1907	Succeeded by Ernesto Nathan
