= Pietro Giubilo =

Italian politician (born 1942)

Pietro Giubilo (born 29 August 1942) is an Italian Christian Democrat politician. On 27 February 2014 he was appointed Knight Grand Cross of the Order of Merit of the Italian Republic.

Political offices
Preceded by Nicola Signorello	Mayor of Rome; 1988–1989	Succeeded by Franco Carraro
