= Nicola Signorello =

Italian politician (1926–2022)

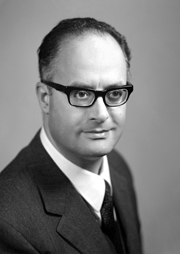
- Born: 18 June 1926; San Nicola da Crissa, Calabria, Italy
- Died: 26 December 2022 (aged 96); Rome, Italy
- Occupations: Politician; publicist
- Political party: Christian Democracy

Nicola Signorello (18 June 1926 – 26 December 2022) was an Italian Christian Democracy politician and publicist.

== Life and career ==
Signorello was born in San Nicola da Crissa, in Calabria, and graduated in Jurisprudence. A member of Christian Democracy (Democrazia Cristiana, DC), he was elected in the provincial council of Rome in 1952, remaining there until 1960 when he became president of the province (in charge until 1965).

Signorello was initially near to Mario Scelba's wing within DC, but later moved to Giulio Andreotti's faction, becoming one of the latter's frontmen in Rome alongside Amerigo Petrucci and Franco Evangelisti. In 1968, he was elected into the Italian Senate, and was confirmed until 1985. Signorello was Minister of Tourism, Sport, and Entertainment in 1973-1974, Minister of Merchant Navy in 1980 (replacing Evangelisti), and then again Minister of Tourism in three consecutive cabinets from 1980 to August 1983.

Signorello was elected as Mayor of Rome in May 1985, after years of Communist government of the city, remaining in charge until resigning in 1988.

In 1989, Signorello was not given a seat by Andreotti in the Italian Senate and was instead given a banking post in the Istituto per il Credito Sportivo.

Signorello died in Rome on 26 December 2022, at the age of 96.
