= 2016 Rome municipal election =

Snap local election in Rome, Italy

- 5 June 2016 (first round); 19 June 2016 (second round)
- Turnout: 57.0% ▲4.2 pp (first round); 50.1% ▼6.9 pp (second round)
- Mayoral election
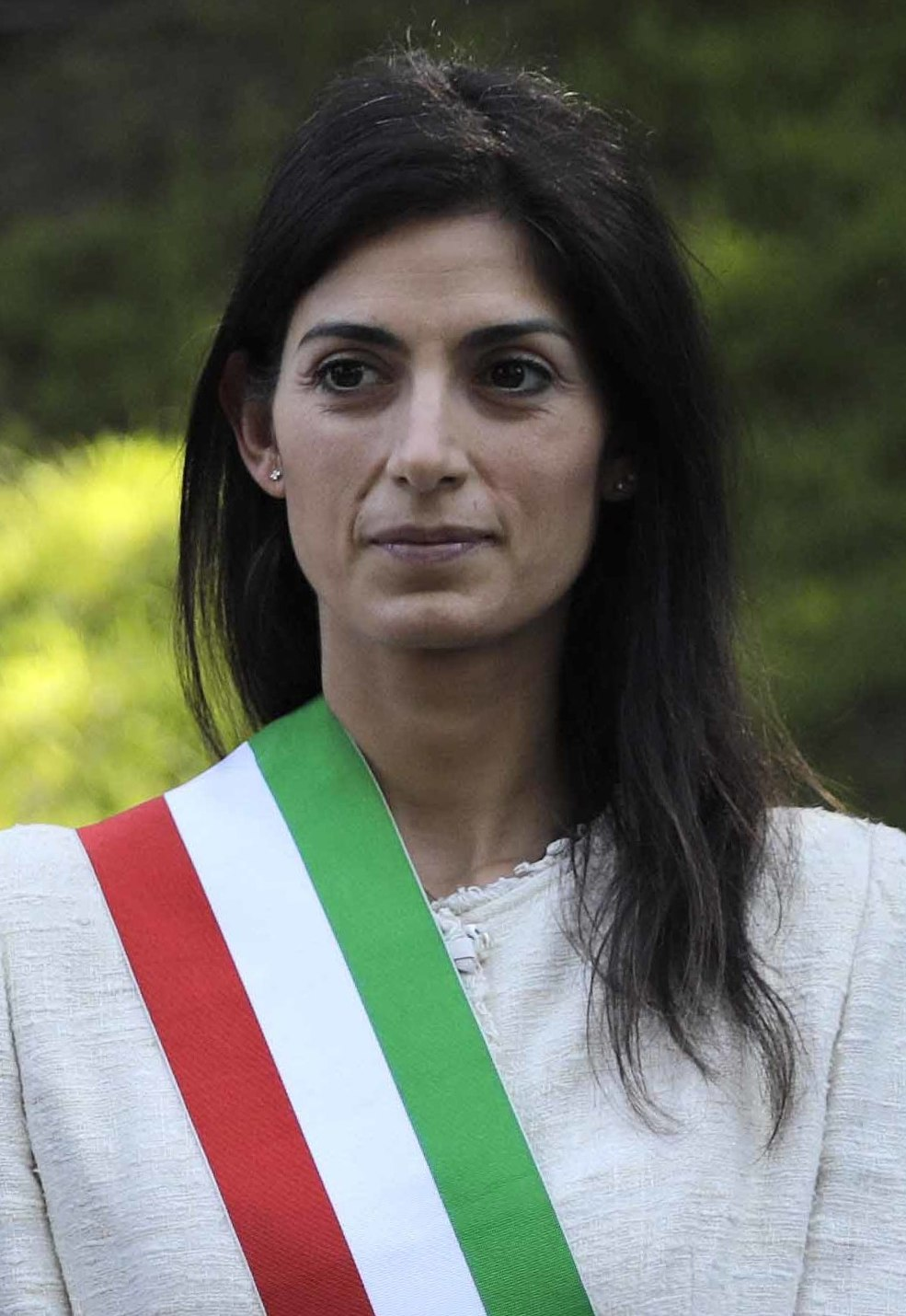

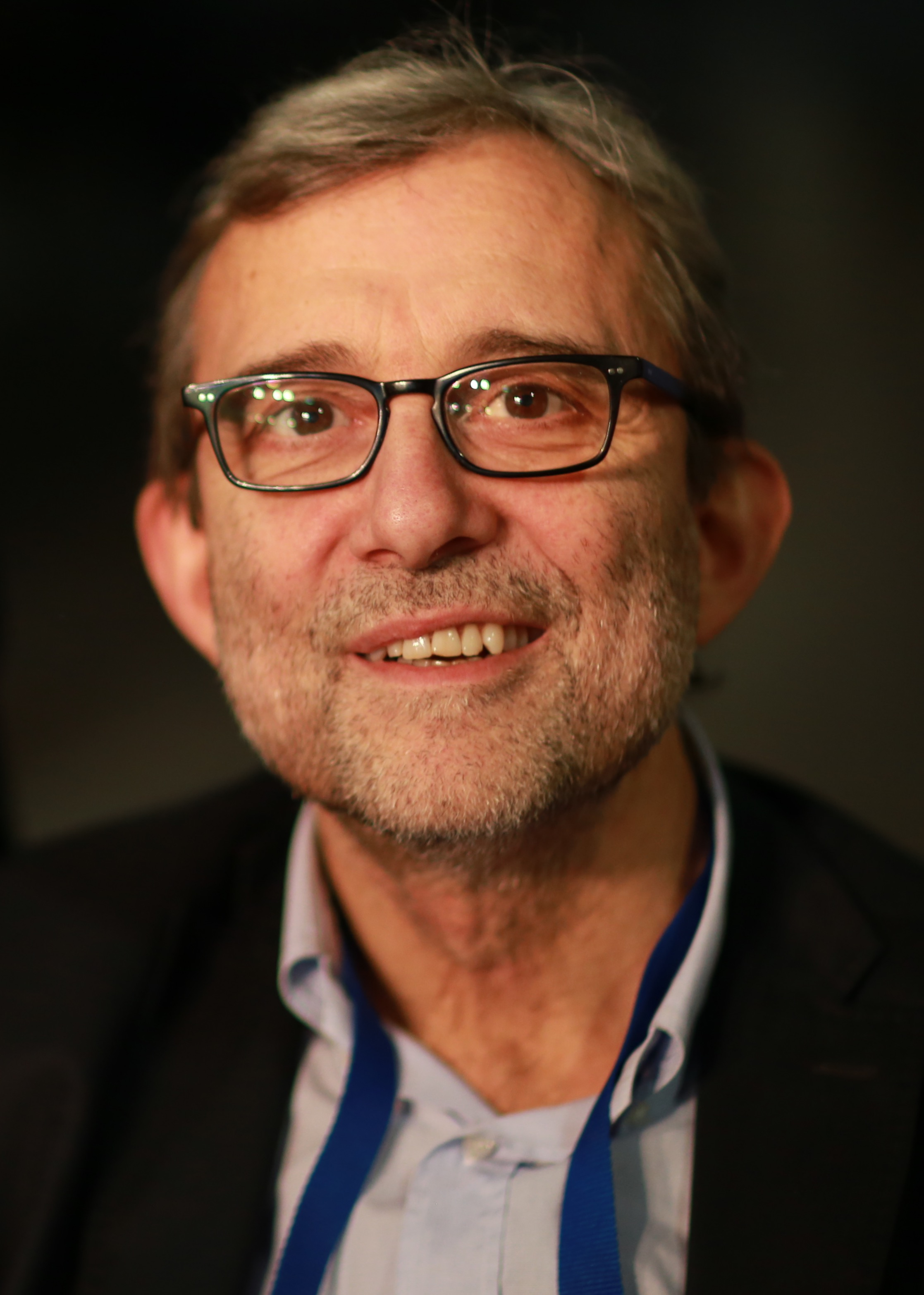
Candidate	Virginia Raggi	Roberto Giachetti
Party	M5S	PD
Alliance	–	Centre-left
1st round vote	453,806	320,170
Percentage	35.25%	24.87%
2nd round vote	770,564	376,935
Percentage	67.15%	32.85%
- First round results by municipi

- Second round results by municipi Red municipi are those with most votes for Giachetti and Yellow those for Raggi.
Mayor before election
Francesco Paolo Tronca
(Special Commissioner)
Elected mayor
Virginia Raggi
M5S
- City Council election
- All 48 seats in the Capitoline Assembly; 25 seats needed for a majority
Party	Leader	Vote %	Seats	+/–
M5S	Virginia Raggi	35.32	29	+25
Centre-left	Roberto Giachetti	25.40	8	−21
Right-wing	Giorgia Meloni	19.63	6	
Centre-right	Alfio Marchini	11.30	4	−8
Left-wing	Stefano Fassina	4.43	1	
This lists parties that won seats. See the complete results below.

Snap municipal elections were held in Rome on 5 and 19 June 2016 to elect the mayor of Rome and 48 members of the City Council of Rome, as well as the fifteen presidents and more than 400 councillors of the 15 municipi in which the municipality is divided. The elections were called following the fall of the former mayor of Rome Ignazio Marino, who was elected with the Democratic Party (PD) in 2013 but was ousted from office after more than half of the members of the City Council resigned in October 2015.

The first round of voting on 5 June produced no outright winner, resulting in a run-off election on 19 June between the Five Star Movement (M5S) candidate Virginia Raggi and the centre-left coalition and PD candidate Roberto Giachetti. Raggi won the mayoral election with two-thirds of the vote, and her party alone won a majority in the City Council, with 29 of the 48 seats. The results were widely reported as a major breakthrough for the M5S, which had previously been seen as a protest party rather than a significant political force. At the same round of elections, the M5S also won the mayoralty of Turin.

== Background ==
On 12 October 2015, the incumbent mayor Ignazio Marino announced his resignation amidst an accusation of expense scandal that had been made by some opposition parties (especially Five Star Movement and the right-wing Brothers of Italy). On 29 October, he retired the resignation. On 30 October, he was ousted from his position after 26 of the 48 members of the City Council resigned. The mayor was replaced by a government-appointed commissioner and snap municipal elections were called.

=== Centre-left coalition primary election ===
As in 2013, the centre-left coalition decided to hold a primary election on 6 March 2016 to decide its mayoral candidate. There were six main candidates, all from the Democratic Party since the left-wing parties decided to break the alliance and present their own mayoral candidate. Among the most popular candidates were deputies Roberto Giachetti and Roberto Morassut. More than 47,000 citizens took part to the primary election, which was won by Giachetti.

Candidate	Supported by	Votes (%)
Roberto Giachetti	PD	64%
Roberto Morassut	PD	28%
Others		8%
Total		100%

=== Five Star Movement primary election ===
As it previously did in different occasion, the Five Star Movement decided to hold a primary election to choose its mayoral candidate. Many candidates took part in the closed primary, which was held online on 23 February 2016. Virginia Raggi, one of the four members of the City Council elected for the M5S in 2013, won the primary with 45% of votes.

== Voting system ==
The voting system is used for all mayoral elections in Italy in the cities with a population higher than 15,000 inhabitants. Under this system, voters express a direct election for the mayor or an indirect election voting for the party of the candidate's coalition. If no candidate receives 50% of votes, the top two candidates go to a second round after two weeks. This gives a result whereby the winning candidate may be able to claim majority support, although it is not guaranteed. The election of the City Council is based on a direct choice for the candidate with a preference vote; the candidate with the majority of the preferences is elected. The number of the seats for each party is determined proportionally.

== Political parties and candidates ==
List of political parties and candidates
Political party or alliance	Constituent party or lists	Candidate
Left-wing coalition	Left for Rome (SEL, PRC, PCdI, AET, POS, FaS)	Stefano Fassina
Left-wing coalition	Fassina for Mayor	Stefano Fassina
Centre-left coalition	Democratic Party	Roberto Giachetti
Centre-left coalition	Democrats and Populars (UDC, CD, DemoS)	Roberto Giachetti
Centre-left coalition	Federation of the Greens	Roberto Giachetti
Centre-left coalition	Italy of Values	Roberto Giachetti
Centre-left coalition	Radicals Federalists Lay Ecologists	Roberto Giachetti
Centre-left coalition	Lay Civic Socialists	Roberto Giachetti
Five Star Movement		Virginia Raggi
Centre-right coalition	Forza Italia	Alfio Marchini
Centre-right coalition	Marchini List	Alfio Marchini
Centre-right coalition	Popular Rome	Alfio Marchini
Centre-right coalition	Storace List	Alfio Marchini
Right-wing coalition	Brothers of Italy	Giorgia Meloni
Right-wing coalition	League – Us with Salvini	Giorgia Meloni
Right-wing coalition	Italian Liberal Party	Giorgia Meloni
Right-wing coalition	Popular Federation for Freedom (PpI, NCDU)	Giorgia Meloni

== Opinion polling ==
=== First round ===
Date	Polling firm	Giachetti	Bertolaso	Raggi	Meloni	Marchini	Fassina	Storace	Others	Lead
19 May 2016	Tecnè	24.0	—N/a	29.9	19.0	17.4	5.1	—N/a	4.6	5.9
18–19 May 2016	IPR	24.0	—N/a	29.0	21.0	19.0	4.0	—N/a	4.0	5.0
17–19 May 2016	ScenariPolitici	25.0	—N/a	27.0	19.0	18.5	7.5	—N/a	3.0	2.0
17–18 May 2016	IZI SpA	24.3	—N/a	26.3	24.1	15.5	6.2	—N/a	3.6	2.0
9–18 May 2016	Demos&Pi	24.5	—N/a	30.5	23.1	11.4	8.1	—N/a	2.4	6.0
16–17 May 2016	IPR	24.0	—N/a	26.0	21.0	20.0	3.0	—N/a	6.0	2.0
12–13 May 2016	Quorum	24.7	—N/a	30.5	21.1	18.4	4.3	—N/a	1.0	5.8
7–12 May 2016	TermometroPolitico	30.5	—N/a	29.5	14.0	18.5	—N/a	—N/a	7.5	1.0
11 May 2016	Tecnè	27.1	—N/a	30.2	19.8	19.0	—N/a	—N/a	3.9	3.1
9 May 2016	Deligo	25.3	—N/a	31.2	24.1	16.9	—N/a	—N/a	2.5	5.9
6 May 2016	TermometroPolitico	29.5	—N/a	28.5	14.5	16.5	6.0	—N/a	5.0	1.0
4–6 May 2016	Index Research	22.0	—N/a	28.0	20.0	19.0	7.5	—N/a	3.5	6.0
3–5 May 2016	ScenariPolitici	23.5	—N/a	26.5	19.5	19.5	6.5	—N/a	4.5	3.0
2 May 2016	Tecnè	20.5	—N/a	28.5	20.0	19.5	7.0	—N/a	4.5	8.5
2 May 2016	Index Research	24.5	—N/a	26.7	19.5	19.5	7.0	—N/a	2.8	2.2
28 April 2016	Tecnè	21.5	—N/a	27.6	20.0	20.9	5.6	1.6	2.8	6.1
20–22 April 2016	IZI SpA	22.4	7.4	28.2	24.0	9.0	6.6	2.4	0.0	4.2
19 April 2016	Tecnè	20.0	—N/a	27.0	21.0	21.0	6.0	2.0	3.0	6.0
19 April 2016	Tecnè	21.0	11.0	26.0	20.0	10.0	7.0	3.0	2.0	5.0
4–8 April 2016	Index Research	24.5	8.1	27.4	17.6	10.4	6.8	3.2	2.0	1.9
22–24 March 2016	ScenariPolitici	26.6	10.5	25.0	17.7	8.9	6.4	4.0	0.9	1.6
14–15 March 2016	ScenariPolitici	24.0	15.0	25.0	14.0	10.0	8.0	2.0	2.0	1.0
14–15 March 2016	ScenariPolitici	24.0	25.0	25.0	—N/a	11.0	8.0	5.0	2.0	0.0
10–11 March 2016	Index Research	30.0	15.0	33.0	—N/a	10.0	5.0	7.0	0.0	3.0

=== Second round ===
Giachetti vs. Raggi

Date	Polling firm	Giachetti	Raggi	Lead
19 May 2016	Tecnè	42.8	57.2	14.4
17–19 May 2016	ScenariPolitici	40.0	60.0	20.0
9–18 May 2016	Demos&Pi	45.8	54.2	8.4
17 May 2016	Tecnè	43.0	57.0	14.0
16–17 May 2016	IPR	42.0	58.0	16.0
12–13 May 2016	Quorum	42.2	57.8	15.6
11 May 2016	Tecnè	40.6	59.4	18.8
3–5 May 2016	ScenariPolitici	40.0	60.0	20.0
2 May 2016	Tecnè	40.0	60.0	20.0
2 May 2016	Index Research	45.0	55.0	10.0
28 April 2016	Tecnè	39.9	60.1	20.2
20–23 April 2016	ScenariPolitici	39.0	61.0	22.0
19 April 2016	Tecnè	41.0	59.0	18.0
17–18 April 2016	Index Research	44.0	56.0	12.0

Meloni vs. Raggi

Date	Polling firm	Meloni	Raggi	Lead
19 May 2016	Tecnè	45.2	54.8	9.6
17–19 May 2016	ScenariPolitici	50.5	49.5	1.0
9–18 May 2016	Demos&Pi	43.3	56.7	13.4
17 May 2016	Tecnè	46.5	53.5	7.0
16–17 May 2016	IPR	48.0	52.0	4.0
12–13 May 2016	Quorum	42.2	57.8	15.6
11 May 2016	Tecnè	45.6	54.4	8.8
3–5 May 2016	ScenariPolitici	51.0	49.0	2.0
2 May 2016	Tecnè	47.0	53.0	6.0
2 May 2016	Index Research	49.0	51.0	2.0
28 April 2016	Tecnè	47.1	52.9	5.8
20–23 April 2016	ScenariPolitici	51.5	48.5	3.0
19 April 2016	Tecnè	48.0	52.0	4.0

Marchini vs. Raggi

Date	Polling firm	Marchini	Raggi	Lead
19 May 2016	Tecnè	45.9	54.1	8.2
17–19 May 2016	ScenariPolitici	48.0	52.0	4.0
17 May 2016	Tecnè	48.0	52.0	4.0
16–17 May 2016	IPR	51.0	49.0	2.0
12–13 May 2016	Quorum	34.5	65.5	31.0
11 May 2016	Tecnè	46.6	53.4	6.8
3–5 May 2016	ScenariPolitici	51.0	49.0	2.0
2 May 2016	Tecnè	48.5	51.5	3.0
2 May 2016	Index Research	51.0	49.0	2.0
28 April 2016	Tecnè	49.6	50.4	0.8
19 April 2016	Tecnè	50.0	50.0	0.0

=== Political parties ===
Date	Polling firm	PD	FI	M5S	LM	SI	FdI	LS	LcS	AP	Others	Lead
9–18 May 2016	Demos&Pi	22.3	7.4	32.2	5.4	3.7	8.5	—N/a	3.2	—N/a	4.3	9.9
7–12 May 2016	TermometroPolitico	24.5	6.5	28.5	10.5	—N/a	11.0	2.0	1.5	—N/a	15.5	4.0
6 May 2016	TermometroPolitico	27.0	6.5	28.0	9.0	6.0	11.0	2.0	2.5	0.5	7.5	1.0
1–3 Mar 2016	ScenariPolitici	28.9	7.9	24.3	6.5	4.7	10.7	5.6	4.9	1.9	4.6	4.6
9–11 Feb 2016	ScenariPolitici	28.6	7.7	27.6	7.2	4.4	12.3	3.1	4.1	1.0	2.5	1.0
18–24 Jan 2016	TermometroPolitico	26.3	6.9	29.1	8.2	3.9	8.5	—N/a	5.2	1.2	10.7	2.8
6 May 2013	Election results	26.3	19.2	12.8	7.5	6.3	5.9	1.3	—N/a	—N/a	20.7	7.1

== Results ==
Summary of the 2016 Rome City Council and Mayoral election results
Candidate	1st round		2nd round		Leader's seat	Political party or party list	Votes	%	Seats
Candidate	Votes	%	Votes	%	Leader's seat	Political party or party list	Votes	%	Seats
Virginia Raggi	461,190	35.26	770,564	67.15	–	Five Star Movement	420,435	35.32	29
Roberto Giachetti	325,835	24.91	376,935	32.85	check	Democratic Party	240,637	17.19	6
Roberto Giachetti	325,835	24.91	376,935	32.85	check	Giachetti for Mayor	49,457	4.15	1
Roberto Giachetti	325,835	24.91	376,935	32.85	check	Democrats and Populars	17,378	1.46	–
Roberto Giachetti	325,835	24.91	376,935	32.85	check	Radicals Federalists Lay Ecologists	14,165	1.19	–
Roberto Giachetti	325,835	24.91	376,935	32.85	check	Lay Civic Socialists	7,716	0.64	–
Roberto Giachetti	325,835	24.91	376,935	32.85	check	Federation of the Greens	5,827	0.49	–
Roberto Giachetti	325,835	24.91	376,935	32.85	check	Italy of Values	3,085	0.25	–
Roberto Giachetti	325,835	24.91	376,935	32.85	check	Total	302,265	25.40	7
Giorgia Meloni	269,760	20.62	–	–	check	Brothers of Italy	146,054	12.27	4
Giorgia Meloni	269,760	20.62	–	–	check	With Giorgia Meloni for Mayor	40,441	3.39	1
Giorgia Meloni	269,760	20.62	–	–	check	League – Us with Salvini	32,175	2.70	–
Giorgia Meloni	269,760	20.62	–	–	check	Italian Liberal Party	10,749	0.90	–
Giorgia Meloni	269,760	20.62	–	–	check	Popular Federation for Freedom	4,146	0.34	–
Giorgia Meloni	269,760	20.62	–	–	check	Total	233,565	19.63	5
Alfio Marchini	143,829	10.99	–	–	check	Alfio Marchini for Mayor	56,686	4.76	2
Alfio Marchini	143,829	10.99	–	–	check	Forza Italia	50,842	4.27	1
Alfio Marchini	143,829	10.99	–	–	check	Popular Rome	15,453	1.29	–
Alfio Marchini	143,829	10.99	–	–	check	Storace List	7,391	0.62	–
Alfio Marchini	143,829	10.99	–	–	check	Christian Revolution	1,747	0.14	–
Alfio Marchini	143,829	10.99	–	–	check	Liberal Network	1,225	0.10	–
Alfio Marchini	143,829	10.99	–	–	check	Italian Building Site Movement	1,124	0.09	–
Alfio Marchini	143,829	10.99	–	–	check	Total	134,468	11.30	3
Stefano Fassina	58,498	4.47	–	–	check	Left for Rome	46,774	3.93	–
Stefano Fassina	58,498	4.47	–	–	check	Fassina for Mayor	6,006	0.50	–
Stefano Fassina	58,498	4.47	–	–	check	Total	52,780	4.43	–
Simone Di Stefano	14,865	1.13	–	–	–	CasaPound	14,118	1.18	–
Alessandro Mustillo	10,371	0.79	–	–	–	Communist Party	9,917	0.83	–
Dario Di Francesco	8,021	0.61	–	–	–	Talking Cricket List – No Euro	4,772	0.39	–
Dario Di Francesco	8,021	0.61	–	–	–	Pensioners' Union	1,131	0.09	–
Dario Di Francesco	8,021	0.61	–	–	–	Movement for Rome	1,032	0.08	–
Dario Di Francesco	8,021	0.61	–	–	–	Centre League	719	0.06	–
Dario Di Francesco	8,021	0.61	–	–	–	With Joy! Long Live Italy	281	0.02	–
Dario Di Francesco	8,021	0.61	–	–	–	Total	7,885	0.66	–
Mario Adinolfi	7,992	0.61	–	–	–	The People of the Family	7,480	0.62	–
Carlo Rienzi	2,760	0.21	–	–	–	Codacons	2,578	0.21	–
Alfredo Iorio	2,641	0.20	–	–	–	Fatherland	2,576	0.21	–
Fabrizio Verduchi	1,310	0.10	–	–	–	Christian Italy	1,185	0.09	–
Michel Emi Maritato	873	0.06	–	–	–	Assotutela	878	0.07	–
Total	1,307,945	100.00	1,147,499	100.00	4		1,190,130	100.00	44
Eligible voters	2,363,776	100.00	2,363,776	100.00					
Did not vote	1,015,736	42.97	1,178,496	49.86					
Voted	1,348,040	57.03	1,185,280	50.14					
Blank or invalid ballots	40,095	2.97	37,781	3.18					
Total valid votes	1,307,945	97.03	1,147,499	96.82					
Source: Ministry of the Interior

== Municipi election ==
Result of municipi election

Results for each municipio with the percentage for each coalition on the second round
Municipio	M5S	Centre-left	Right-wing	Elected President	Party
I	49.2	50.8	–	Sabrina Alfonsi	PD
II	48.3	51.7	–	Francesca Del Bello	PD
III	62.9	37.1	–	Roberta Capoccioni	M5S
IV	68.2	31.8	–	Roberta Della Casa	M5S
V	67.8	32.2	–	Giovanni Boccuzzi	M5S
VI	72.9	–	27.1	Roberto Romanella	M5S
VII	64.8	35.2	–	Monica Lozzi	M5S
VIII	59.1	40.9	–	Paolo Pace	M5S
IX	65.0	35.0	–	Dario D'Innocenti	M5S
X	Municipal Council and President suspended				
XI	61.9	38.1	–	Mario Torelli	M5S
XII	56.9	43.1	–	Silvia Crescimanno	M5S
XIII	64.7	35.3	–	Giuseppina Castagnetta	M5S
XIV	61.9	38.1	–	Alfredo Campagna	M5S
XV	58.6	41.2	–	Stefano Simonelli	M5S

All the presidents were elected on the second round, since none obtained more than 50% of votes on the first round of voting. The president of Municipio X was not elected since the municipio was under the administration of a Special Commissioner nominated after the municipal council had been dissolved in 2015 due to mafia association. Source: Municipality of Rome – Electoral Service

== See also ==
- 2016 Italian local elections
- 2016 Turin municipal election
- Opinion polling for the 2016 Italian local elections
