= 2021 Rome municipal election =

Election in Rome

- 3–4 October 2021 (first round); 17–18 October 2021 (second round)
- Turnout: 48.5% ▼8.5 pp (first round); 40.7% ▼7.8 pp (second round)
- Mayoral election
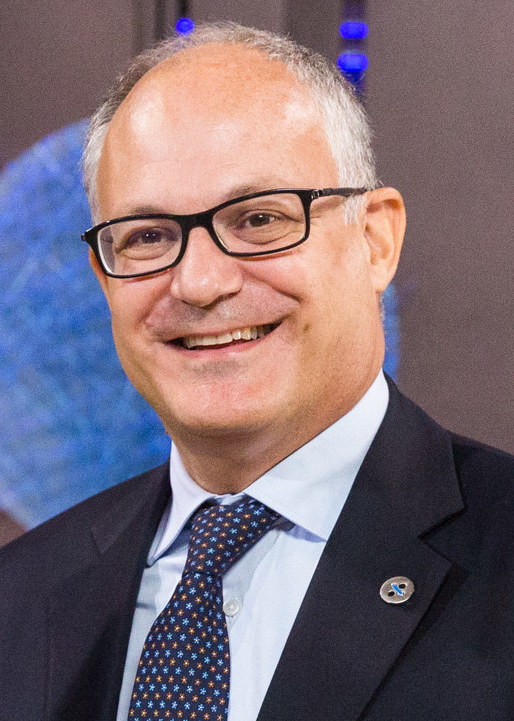

Candidate	Roberto Gualtieri	Enrico Michetti
Party	PD	Independent
Alliance	Centre-left	Centre-right
1st Round vote	299,976	334,548
Percentage	27.8%	30.1%
2nd Round vote	565,352	374,577
Percentage	60.2%	39.8%
Mayor before election
Virginia Raggi
M5S
Elected mayor
Roberto Gualtieri
PD
- City Council election
- All 48 seats in the Capitoline Assembly; 25 seats needed for a majority
Party	Leader	Vote %	Seats	+/–
Centre-left	Roberto Gualtieri	27.9	29	+21
Centre-right	Enrico Michetti	31.4	9	+5
Calenda List	Carlo Calenda	19.1	5	
Five Star Movement	Virginia Raggi	17.7	5	−24
This lists parties that won seats. See the complete results below.

Municipal elections took place in Rome on 3–4 October 2021 and 17–18 October 2021. Open for election were the office of Mayor of Rome and all the 48 seats of the City Council, as well as the presidents and councils of each of the fifteen municipi in which the city is divided.

Local elections in Italy are usually scheduled between 15 April and 15 June, however on 4 March 2021 the Italian government decided to postpone them to the autumn following a new spike of cases in the coronavirus pandemic.

Roberto Gualtieri, member of the Democratic Party (PD) and former minister, was elected mayor, winning in the runoff against centre-right independent Enrico Michetti with just over 60% of the vote. The incumbent mayor Virginia Raggi was defeated after failing to qualify for the runoff.

== Voting system ==
The voting system is used for all mayoral elections in Italy's cities with a population higher than 15,000 inhabitants. Under this system, voters express a direct choice for the mayor or an indirect choice voting for the party of the candidate's coalition. If no candidate receives 50% of votes during the first round, the top two candidates go to a second round after two weeks. The winning candidate obtains a majority bonus equal to 60% of seats. During the first round, if no candidate gets more than 50% of votes but a coalition of lists gets the majority of 50% of votes or if the mayor is elected in the first round but its coalition gets less than 40% of the valid votes, the majority bonus cannot be assigned to the coalition of the winning mayor candidate.

The election of the City Council is based on a direct choice for the candidate with a maximum of two preferential votes, each for a different gender, belonging to the same party list: the candidate with the majority of the preferences is elected. The number of the seats for each party is determined proportionally, using D'Hondt seat allocation. Only coalitions with more than 3% of votes are eligible to get any seats.

== Background ==
=== Centre-left primary election ===
The primary election took place on 20 June 2021:

Candidate	Party	Votes	%	Notes
Roberto Gualtieri	PD	28,561	60.6%	
Giovanni Caudo	Independent	7,388	15.7%	
Paolo Ciani	DemoS	3,372	7.2%	
Imma Battaglia	Free Rome	2,987	6.3%	
Stefano Fassina	SI	2,625	5.6%	
Tobia Zevi	Independent	1,663	3.5%	
Cristina Grancio	PSI	497	1.1%	
Total		48,624	100.0%	

==== Endorsements ====
===== Roberto Gualtieri =====
- Monica Cirinnà (PD), Senator (2013-present)
- Enrico Letta (PD), current Secretary of the Democratic Party (2021–2023) and former Prime Minister (2013–2014)
- Nicola Zingaretti (PD), former President of Lazio (2013–2023), former Secretary of the Democratic Party (2019–2021)

===== Giovanni Caudo =====
- Giuseppe Civati, leader of Possible (2016–2018)
- Ignazio Marino, former mayor of Rome (2013–2015)

== Parties and candidates ==
This is a list of the parties and their respective leaders which will participate in the election.

Political force or alliance	Constituent lists	Candidate
M5S coalition	Five Star Movement	Virginia Raggi
M5S coalition	Civic List for Virginia Raggi	Virginia Raggi
M5S coalition	Ecologist Rome	Virginia Raggi
M5S coalition	Sportsmen for Rome	Virginia Raggi
M5S coalition	With Women for Rome	Virginia Raggi
M5S coalition	Rome Decides	Virginia Raggi
Centre-left coalition	Democratic Party	Roberto Gualtieri
Centre-left coalition	Civic List Gualtieri for Mayor (incl. The Young Rome, MRE)	Roberto Gualtieri
Centre-left coalition	Civic Ecologist Left (incl. SI, Art.1, èViva, PAI, To Free Rome)	Roberto Gualtieri
Centre-left coalition	Future Rome (incl. Pos, Volt, GI, RI, POP)	Roberto Gualtieri
Centre-left coalition	Green Europe	Roberto Gualtieri
Centre-left coalition	Solidary Democracy	Roberto Gualtieri
Centre-left coalition	Italian Socialist Party	Roberto Gualtieri
Centre-right coalition	League	Enrico Michetti
Centre-right coalition	Brothers of Italy	Enrico Michetti
Centre-right coalition	Forza Italia – UDC (incl. NcI, PLI)	Enrico Michetti
Centre-right coalition	Civic List Michetti for Mayor	Enrico Michetti
Centre-right coalition	Renaissance – Cambiamo (incl. People's Democracy, Animalist Revolution, Italy Worksite)	Enrico Michetti
Centre-right coalition	European Liberal Party	Enrico Michetti
Calenda for Mayor (incl. Action, Italia Viva, More Europe, PRI, European Italy, Good Right)		Carlo Calenda
Civic rEvolution		Monica Lozzi
Rome concerns you (incl. PRC, PdS, Rome for integral ecology)		Paolo Berdini
Communist Party		Micaela Quintavalle
Italian Liberists		Andrea Bernaudo
Gay Party		Fabrizio Marrazzo
Italy of Values		Rosario Trefiletti
Reconquer Italy (incl. Italexit, Vox Italy)		Gilberto Trombetta
Power to the People		Elisabetta Canitano
The People of the Family		Fabiola Cenciotti
Italian Communist Party		Cristina Crillo
Social Idea Movement		Gianluca Gismondi
Children of Italy, children around the world		Carlo Priolo
3V Movement		Luca Teodori
Workers' Communist Party		Francesco Grisolia
Libertas Movement		Paolo Oronzo Mogli
Party of Good Manners		Giuseppe Cirillo
Active Rome		Margherita Corrado
Nero List - Roman Historical Movement		Sergio Iacomoni

== Opinion polls ==
Centre-left primary election

Date	Polling firm/ Client	Battaglia	Caudo	Ciani	Fassina	Grancio	Gualtieri	Zevi	Lead
20 June 2021	Primary results	6.3	15.7	7.2	5.6	1.1	60.6	3.5	44.9
11–16 Jun 2021	BiDiMedia	7.0	28.0	7.0	5.0	1.0	47.0	5.0	19.0

First round

Date	Polling firm/ Client	Sample size	Raggi	Gualtieri	Michetti	Calenda	Others	Undecided	Lead
4 October 2021	Election result	-	19.1	27.0	30.1	19.8	3.9	-	3.1
13–15 Sep 2021	BiDiMedia	1,540	18.8	28.0	31.1	15.5	6.6	20.0	3.1
12–15 Sep 2021	Noto	1,000	23.0	25.0	27.0	21.0	4.0	32.0	2.0
9–15 Sep 2021	SWG	1,500	17.0	28.0	31.0	20.0	4.0	—N/a	3.0
8–13 Sep 2021	Index	1,000	23.0	27.0	31.0	17.0	2.0	47.0	4.0
6–13 Sep 2021	Ipsos	1,000	15.5	28.5	36.0	14.0	6.0	32.8	7.5
6–11 Sep 2021	Tecnè	2,000	20.0	25.0	32.0	17.0	6.0	45.0	7.0
7–10 Sep 2021	Quorum	805	18.9	26.4	30.8	19.0	4.9	43.8	4.4
8–9 Sep 2021	IZI	1,088	20.7	25.0	25.9	18.4	10.0	—N/a	0.9
3–8 Sep 2021	YouTrend	802	19.1	27.0	31.0	18.9	4.0	44.1	4.0
31 Aug–7 Sep 2021	SWG	1,200	17.0	27.0	32.0	21.0	3.0	19.0	5.0
29–31 Aug 2021	BiDiMedia	1,439	19.6	26.9	31.3	15.7	6.5	—N/a	4.4
26–31 Aug 2021	GPF	2,523	22.7	28.6	34.7	13.5	0.5	—N/a	6.1
10 Aug 2021	Opinio Italia	—N/a	19.0	25.0	33.0	17.0	6.0	—N/a	8.0
28–30 Jul 2021	IZI	1,039	24.7	25.8	29.1	16.8	3.6	—N/a	3.3
23–26 Jul 2021	Demopolis	6,812	21.0	24.0	32.0	20.0	3.0	—N/a	8.0
16–19 Jul 2021	Tecnè	1,000	20.0	26.0	36.0	14.0	4.0	47.0	10.0
7–11 Jul 2021	Lab2101	924	21.6	22.4	31.1	17.2	7.7	—N/a	8.7
1 Jul 2021	Tecnè	800	18.8	27.2	34.6	15.3	4.1	47.6	7.4
25 Jun–1 Jul 2021	Termometro Politico	1,000	20.0	25.0	38.0	12.0	5.0	—N/a	13.0
21–23 Jun 2021	Winpoll	800	21.3	25.5	29.2	17.8	6.2	26.0	3.7
18–20 Jun 2021	Tecnè	800	16.0	30.0	35.0	15.0	4.0	48.0	5.0
16–18 Jun 2021	Noto	1,000	26.0	23.0	35.0	14.0	2.0	—N/a	9.0
11–12 Jun 2021	Demoskopica	673	15.0	33.0	35.0	13.0	4.0	—N/a	2.0
9–12 Jun 2021	BiDiMedia	3,878	21.4	27.0	28.5	14.9	8.2	25.0	1.5

Second round

Raggi vs. Calenda

Date	Polling firm/ Client	Sample size	Raggi	Calenda	Abstain	Lead
9–15 Sep 2021	SWG	1,500	32.0	68.0	—N/a	36.0
8–13 Sep 2021	Index	1,000	41.0	59.0	21.0	18.0
8–9 Sep 2021	IZI	1,088	37.3	62.7	40.7	25.4
31 Aug–7 Sep 2021	SWG	1,200	26.0	74.0	—N/a	48.0
28–30 Jul 2021	IZI	1,039	48.1	51.9	29.3	3.8
23–26 Jul 2021	Demopolis	6,812	44.3	55.7	30.0	11.4
7–11 Jul 2021	Lab2101	924	42.6	57.4	—N/a	14.8
25 Jun–1 Jul 2021	Termometro Politico	1,000	28.6	71.4	—N/a	42.8
28–30 Jun 2021	IZI	1,027	37.4	62.6	36.7	25.2
9–12 Jun 2021	BiDiMedia	3,878	34.0	66.0	—N/a	32.0
22–27 Mar 2021	BiDiMedia	1,761	40.0	60.0	—N/a	20.0
25 Mar 2021	Lab2101	—N/a	43.1	56.9	—N/a	13.8
15–17 Mar 2021	IZI	1,042	48.5	51.5	30.1	3.0
2–3 Mar 2021	IZI	1,055	44.9	55.1	31.0	10.1

Raggi vs. Gualtieri

Date	Polling firm/ Client	Sample size	Raggi	Gualtieri	Abstain	Lead
9–15 Sep 2021	SWG	1,500	32.0	68.0	—N/a	36.0
8–13 Sep 2021	Index	1,000	42.0	58.0	31.0	16.0
8–9 Sep 2021	IZI	1,088	35.1	64.9	45.0	29.8
31 Aug–7 Sep 2021	SWG	1,200	40.0	60.0	—N/a	20.0
29–31 Aug 2021	BiDiMedia	1,439	38.0	62.0	—N/a	24.0
26–31 Aug 2021	GPF	2,523	36.9	63.1	17.2	26.2
28–30 Jul 2021	IZI	1,039	43.1	56.9	30.7	13.7
23–26 Jul 2021	Demopolis	6,812	47.9	52.1	29.0	4.2
7–11 Jul 2021	Lab2101	924	49.1	50.9	—N/a	1.8
25 Jun–1 Jul 2021	Termometro Politico	1,000	33.0	66.7	—N/a	33.7
28–30 Jun 2021	IZI	1,027	37.6	62.4	39.1	24.8
9–12 Jun 2021	BiDiMedia	3,878	35.0	65.0	—N/a	30.0
22–27 Mar 2021	BiDiMedia	1,761	36.0	64.0	—N/a	28.0
25 Mar 2021	Lab2101	—N/a	51.8	48.2	—N/a	3.6
15–17 Mar 2021	IZI	1,042	47.5	52.5	34.1	5.0
2–3 Mar 2021	IZI	1,055	45.5	54.5	35.0	9.0

Raggi vs. Michetti

Date	Polling firm/ Client	Sample size	Raggi	Michetti	Abstain	Lead
9–15 Sep 2021	SWG	1,500	45.0	55.0	—N/a	10.0
8–13 Sep 2021	Index	1,000	41.0	59.0	35.0	10.0
8–9 Sep 2021	IZI	1,088	48.2	51.8	47.1	3.6
3–8 Sep 2021	YouTrend	802	46.1	53.9	47.5	7.8
31 Aug–7 Sep 2021	SWG	1,200	38.0	62.0	—N/a	24.0
29–31 Aug 2021	BiDiMedia	1,439	46.0	54.0	—N/a	8.0
26–31 Aug 2021	GPF	2,523	42.3	57.7	17.1	15.4
28–30 Jul 2021	IZI	1,039	48.1	51.9	28.7	3.8
23–26 Jul 2021	Demopolis	6,812	45.1	54.9	29.0	9.8
7–11 Jul 2021	Lab2101	924	47.7	52.3	—N/a	4.6
25 Jun–1 Jul 2021	Termometro Politico	1,000	38.7	61.3	—N/a	22.6
28–30 Jun 2021	IZI	1,027	42.1	57.9	37.6	15.8
21–23 Jun 2021	Winpoll	800	44.2	55.8	—N/a	11.6
9–12 Jun 2021	BiDiMedia	3,878	47.0	53.0	—N/a	6.0

Gualtieri vs. Calenda

Date	Polling firm/ Client	Sample size	Gualtieri	Calenda	Abstain	Lead
9–15 Sep 2021	SWG	1,500	50.0	50.0	—N/a	Tie
8–9 Sep 2021	IZI	1,088	53.6	46.4	45.7	7.2
31 Aug–7 Sep 2021	SWG	1,200	44.0	56.0	—N/a	12.0
28–30 Jul 2021	IZI	1,039	55.1	44.9	37.7	10.1
23–26 Jul 2021	Demopolis	6,812	43.7	56.3	29.0	12.6
7–11 Jul 2021	Lab2101	924	44.2	55.8	—N/a	11.6
25 Jun–1 Jul 2021	Termometro Politico	1,000	45.2	54.8	—N/a	9.6
28–30 Jun 2021	IZI	1,027	51.5	48.5	38.4	3.0
9–12 Jun 2021	BiDiMedia	3,878	51.0	49.0	—N/a	2.0
22–27 Mar 2021	BiDiMedia	1,761	54.0	46.0	—N/a	8.0
15–17 Mar 2021	IZI	1,042	53.0	47.0	44.1	5.9
2–3 Mar 2021	IZI	1,055	51.7	48.3	42.0	3.4

Gualtieri vs. Michetti

Date	Polling firm/ Client	Sample size	Gualtieri	Michetti	Abstain	Lead
13–15 Sep 2021	BiDiMedia	1,540	56.0	44.0	27.0	12.0
9–15 Sep 2021	SWG	1,500	58.0	42.0	—N/a	16.0
8–13 Sep 2021	Index	1,000	55.0	45.0	25.0	10.0
6–13 Sep 2021	Ipsos	1,000	53.0	47.0	45.0	6.0
7–10 Sep 2021	Quorum	805	59.0	41.0	48.4	18.0
8–9 Sep 2021	IZI	1,088	59.5	40.5	37.0	19.0
3–8 Sep 2021	YouTrend	802	58.5	41.5	47.8	17.0
31 Aug–7 Sep 2021	SWG	1,200	52.0	48.0	—N/a	4.0
29–31 Aug 2021	BiDiMedia	1,439	55.0	45.0	—N/a	10.0
26–31 Aug 2021	GPF	2,523	53.9	46.1	18.3	7.8
28–30 Jul 2021	IZI	1,039	54.5	45.5	23.1	9.0
23–26 Jul 2021	Demopolis	6,812	50.0	50.0	26.0	Tie
7–11 Jul 2021	Lab2101	924	48.9	51.1	—N/a	2.2
25 Jun–1 Jul 2021	Termometro Politico	1,000	45.7	54.3	—N/a	7.7
28–30 Jun 2021	IZI	1,027	54.3	45.7	30.2	8.6
21–23 Jun 2021	Winpoll	800	53.5	46.5	—N/a	7.0
9–12 Jun 2021	BiDiMedia	3,878	58.0	42.0	—N/a	16.0

Calenda vs. Michetti

Date	Polling firm/ Client	Sample size	Calenda	Michetti	Abstain	Lead
9–15 Sep 2021	SWG	1,500	58.0	42.0	—N/a	16.0
8–9 Sep 2021	IZI	1,088	57.1	42.9	45.7	14.2
3–8 Sep 2021	YouTrend	802	61.6	38.4	50.2	23.2
31 Aug–7 Sep 2021	SWG	1,200	56.0	44.0	—N/a	12.0
29–31 Aug 2021	BiDiMedia	1,439	56.0	44.0	—N/a	12.0
26–31 Aug 2021	GPF	2,523	41.4	58.6	20.1	17.2
28–30 Jul 2021	IZI	1,039	50.1	49.9	33.1	0.2
23–26 Jul 2021	Demopolis	6,812	52.8	47.2	28.0	5.6
7–11 Jul 2021	Lab2101	924	51.4	48.6	—N/a	2.8
25 Jun–1 Jul 2021	Termometro Politico	1,000	47.6	52.4	—N/a	4.8
28–30 Jun 2021	IZI	1,027	53.5	46.5	37.0	7.0
21–23 Jun 2021	Winpoll	800	54.8	45.2	—N/a	9.6
9–12 Jun 2021	BiDiMedia	3,878	57.0	43.0	—N/a	14.0

City Council election – Parties

Date	Polling firm	Sample size	M5S		Centre-left				Centre-right				Action – others	Others	Undecided	Lead
Date	Polling firm	Sample size	M5S	Other	PD	Art.1-SI	EV	Other	FdI	FI	Lega	Other	Action – others	Others	Undecided	Lead
4 October 2021	Election result	-	11.0	6.7	16.4	2.0	0.9	8.6	17.4	3.6	5.9	4.5	19.1	4.0	-	1.7
13–15 Sep 2021	BiDiMedia	1,540	14.2	4.1	16.1	3.4	1.0	7.9	18.5	4.3	6.9	3.1	13.8	6.7	20.0	2.4
9–15 Sep 2021	SWG	1,500	12.2	4.3	19.8	3.2	1.1	7.1	18.3	3.6	8.1	4.5	16.3	2.5	18.0	1.5
8–13 Sep 2021	Index	1,000	14.0	7.5	18.5	3.2	—N/a	8.0	17.5	3.5	6.0	5.0	14.5	2.3	—N/a	1.0
6–13 Sep 2021	Ipsos	1,000	10.9	3.4	22.8	2.2	1.4	5.2	18.2	4.8	14.0	2.4	10.1	4.6	—N/a	4.6
8–9 Sep 2021	IZI	1,088	17.2	—N/a	22.2	3.0	2.5	7.4	16.5	5.2	6.5	0.6	9.4	6.4	—N/a	5.0
3–8 Sep 2021	YouTrend	802	13.4	2.6	21.9	7.7			18.3	4.9	10.7	3.1	12.2	5.2	48.1	3.6
31 Aug–7 Sep 2021	SWG	1,200	12.2	5.1	18.5	3.9	1.2	5.1	17.7	2.8	9.1	5.4	17.6	1.4	—N/a	0.6
29–31 Aug 2021	BiDiMedia	1,439	14.0	5.1	16.1	3.4	0.7	6.3	19.2	4.1	6.1	3.0	14.4	6.8	23.0	3.1
1 Jul 2021	Tecné	800	13.7	4.1	22.4	6.0			21.8	4.0	9.1	1.2	13.4	4.3	47.6	0.6
16–18 Jun 2021	Noto	1,000	14.0	11.0	18.5	2.5	2.0	2.0	21.0	4.0	8.0	3.0	11.0	4.0	—N/a	2.5
9–12 Jun 2021	BiDiMedia	3,878	19.2	—N/a	18.4	3.6	0.9	6.3	19.0	4.0	7.5	0.7	12.3	8.1	25.0	0.2
5 June 2016	Election result	-	35.3	DNP	17.2	3.9	0.5	7.7	12.3	4.3	2.7	11.6	DNP	5.8	-	18.1

== Results ==
Summary of the 2021 Rome City Council and Mayoral election results
Mayoral candidate	1st round		2nd round		Leader's seat	Parties	Votes	%	Seats
Mayoral candidate	Votes	%	Votes	%	Leader's seat	Parties	Votes	%	Seats
Roberto Gualtieri	299,976	27.0	565,352	60.2	–	Democratic Party	166,194	16.4	18
Roberto Gualtieri	299,976	27.0	565,352	60.2	–	Gualtieri for Mayor	54,779	5.4	5
Roberto Gualtieri	299,976	27.0	565,352	60.2	–	Civic Ecologist Left	20,501	2.0	2
Roberto Gualtieri	299,976	27.0	565,352	60.2	–	Future Rome	20,028	2.0	2
Roberto Gualtieri	299,976	27.0	565,352	60.2	–	Solidary Democracy	9,610	1.0	1
Roberto Gualtieri	299,976	27.0	565,352	60.2	–	Green Europe	9,354	0.9	1
Roberto Gualtieri	299,976	27.0	565,352	60.2	–	Italian Socialist Party	2,841	0.3	0
Roberto Gualtieri	299,976	27.0	565,352	60.2	–	Total	283,307	27.9	29 (Note: Even if the coalition didn't receive the majority of votes, no other alliance was able to obtain overall more than 50% of votes. Once its mayoral candidate won the second round, the coalition was awarded the majority bonus granted by the electoral law to the alliance whose candidate is elected mayor.)
Enrico Michetti	334,548	30.1	374,577	39.9	check	Brothers of Italy	176,809	17.4	5
Enrico Michetti	334,548	30.1	374,577	39.9	check	League	60,183	5.9	2
Enrico Michetti	334,548	30.1	374,577	39.9	check	Forza Italia – Union of the Centre	36,444	3.6	1
Enrico Michetti	334,548	30.1	374,577	39.9	check	Michetti for Mayor	25,048	2.5	0
Enrico Michetti	334,548	30.1	374,577	39.9	check	Renaissance – Let's Change Rome	18,659	1.8	0
Enrico Michetti	334,548	30.1	374,577	39.9	check	European Liberal Party	1,371	0.1	0
Enrico Michetti	334,548	30.1	374,577	39.9	check	Total	318,514	31.4	8
Carlo Calenda	219,878	19.8	–	–	check	Calenda for Mayor	193,477	19.1	4
Virginia Raggi	211,936	19.1	–	–	check	Five Star Movement	111,668	11.0	3
Virginia Raggi	211,936	19.1	–	–	check	Raggi List	43,581	4.3	1
Virginia Raggi	211,936	19.1	–	–	check	Ecologist Rome	10.328	1.0	0
Virginia Raggi	211,936	19.1	–	–	check	Sportsmen for Rome	6,855	0.7	0
Virginia Raggi	211,936	19.1	–	–	check	With the Women for Rome	4,895	0.5	0
Virginia Raggi	211,936	19.1	–	–	check	Rome Decides	2,255	0.2	0
Virginia Raggi	211,936	19.1	–	–	check	Total	179,582	17.7	4
Luca Teodori	7,139	0.6	–	–	–	3V Movement	6,512	0.6	0
Elisabetta Canitano	6,615	0.6	–	–	–	Power to the People	6,090	0.6	0
Paolo Berdini	4,722	0.4	–	–	–	Rome Concerns You (PRC – PdS)	4,215	0.4	0
Monica Lozzi	4546	0.4	–	–	–	Civic rEvolution	4224	0.4	0
Micaela Quintavalle	3,781	0.3	–	–	–	Communist Party	3,583	0.4	0
Cristina Cirillo	3,781	0.3	–	–	–	Italian Communist Party	3,253	0.3	0
Fabrizio Marrazzo	2,735	0.3	–	–	–	Gay Party	2,599	0.3	0
Fabiola Cenciotti	2,056	0.2	–	–	–	The People of the Family	1,634	0.2	0
Gilberto Trombetta	1,704	0.2	–	–	–	Reconquer Italy	1,525	0.2	0
Rosario Trefiletti	1,598	0.1	–	–	–	Italy of Values	1,460	0.1	0
Gianluca Gismondi	1,573	0.1	–	–	–	Social Idea Movement	1,486	0.2	0
Andrea Bernaudo	1,046	0.1	–	–	–	Italian Liberists	944	0.1	0
Sergio Iacomoni	740	0.1	–	–	–	Nero List	695	0.1	0
Margherita Corrado	618	0.1	–	–	–	Civic Project Active Rome	593	0.1	0
Sergio Iacomoni	510	0.1	–	–	–	Workers' Communist Party	477	0.1	0
Paolo Oronzo Magli	408	0.0	–	–	–	Libertas Political Movement	395	0.0	0
Giuseppe Cirillo	340	0.0	–	–	–	Party of Good Manners	253	0.0	0
Carlo Priolo	190	0.0	–	–	–	Children of Italy, Children Around the World	166	0.0	0
Total	1,109,912	100	939,929	100	3	Total parties	1,014,838	100	45
Total valid votes	1,109,912	96.91	939,929	97.93					
Blank or invalid ballots	35,356	3.09	19,889	2.07					
Turnout	1,145,268	48.54	959,818	40.68					
Eligible voters	2,359,248	100.00	2,359,248	100.00					
Source: Ministry of the Interior (first round, second round)

== Results in the Municipi ==
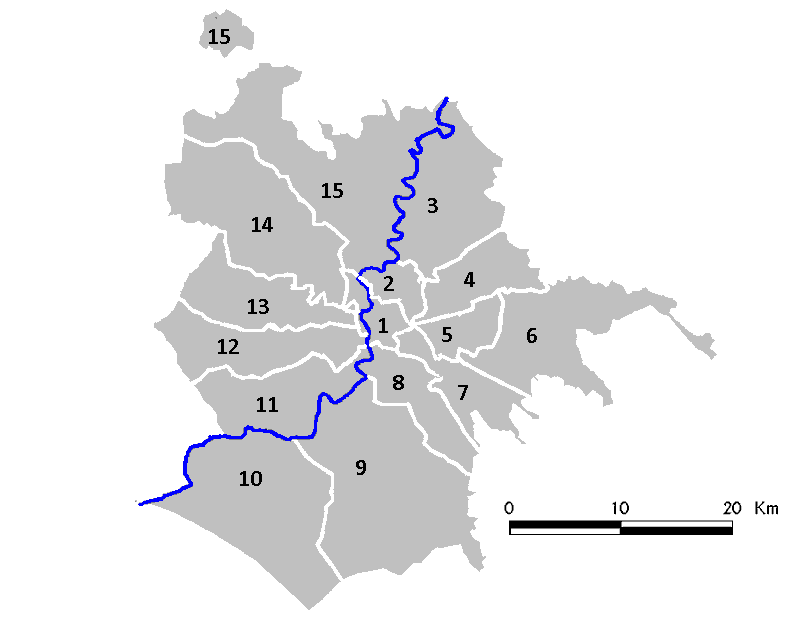

Municipi are governed by a president and a council of four members who are elected by its residents every five years. The municipi frequently cross the boundaries of the traditional, non-administrative divisions of the city.

All presidents of municipi were elected at the second round. The centre-left won 14 Municipi whereas the centre-right gained only Municipio VI. Table below shows the results for each municipio with the percentage for each coalition on the second round:

Municipio	Centre-left	Centre-right	M5S	Elected President	Party
I	65.9	34.1	—N/a	Lorenza Bonaccorsi	PD
II	64.0	36.0	—N/a	Francesca Del Bello	PD
III	62.4	37.6	—N/a	Paolo Emilio Marchionne	PD
IV	59.3	40.7	—N/a	Massimiliano Umberti	PD
V	59.5	40.5	—N/a	Mauro Caliste	PD
VI	—N/a	61.0	39.0	Nicola Franco	FdI
VII	63.7	36.3	—N/a	Francesco Laddaga	PD
VIII	70.1	29.9	—N/a	Amedeo Ciaccheri	SI
IX	58.8	41.2	—N/a	Teresa Maria Di Salvo	PD
X	53.3	46.7	—N/a	Mario Falconi	PD
XI	59.5	40.5	—N/a	Gianluca Lanzi	PD
XII	66.5	33.5	—N/a	Elio Tomassetti	PD
XIII	55.5	45.5	—N/a	Sabrina Giuseppetti	PD
XIV	59.1	40.9	—N/a	Marco Della Porta	PD
XV	51.5	48.5	—N/a	Daniele Torquati	PD

Source: Municipality of Rome - Electoral Service

== Declined candidates ==
=== Centre-left coalition ===
- Fabrizio Barca, former Minister of Regional Affairs and Territorial Cohesion (2011–2013)
- Federico Lobuono, The Young Rome (2021-present)
- Monica Cirinnà, Senator (2013-2022)
- Giuseppe Conte, former Prime Minister of Italy (2018–2021)
- Enrico Letta, former Prime Minister of Italy (2013–2014)
- David Sassoli, President of the European Parliament since 2019
- Nicola Zingaretti, President of Lazio since 2013

=== Centre-right coalition ===
- Andrea Abodi, businessman
- Guido Bertolaso, head of Civil Protection (2001–2010)
- Rita dalla Chiesa, journalist
- Massimo Giletti, journalist
- General Claudio Graziano, Chairman of the European Union Military Committee since 2018
- Giorgia Meloni, leader of Brothers of Italy
- Nicola Porro, journalist

== See also ==
- 2021 Italian local elections
