= Roberto Gualtieri =

Italian politician (born 1966)

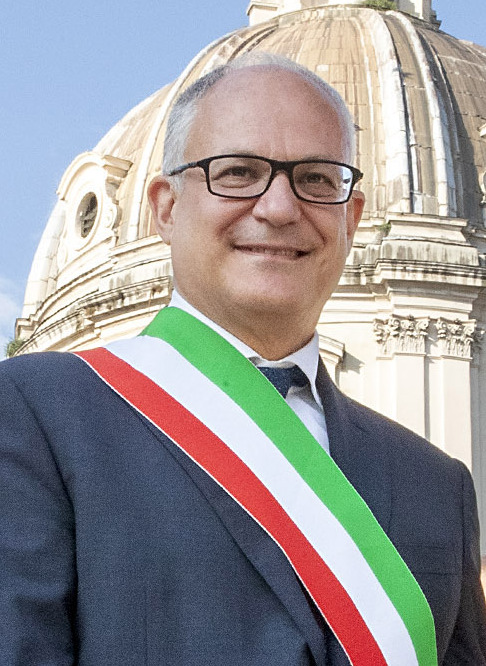

Mayor of Rome
- Incumbent
- Assumed office 21 October 2021
- Preceded by: Virginia Raggi

Minister of Economy and Finance
- In office 5 September 2019 – 13 February 2021
- Prime Minister: Giuseppe Conte
- Preceded by: Giovanni Tria
- Succeeded by: Daniele Franco

Member of the Chamber of Deputies
- In office 5 March 2020 – 4 November 2021
- Constituency: Rome – Trionfale

Member of the European Parliament
- In office 14 July 2009 – 5 September 2019
- Constituency: Central Italy

Personal details
- Born: 19 July 1966 (age 60) Rome, Italy
- Party: PCI (1985–1991); PDS (1991–1998); DS (1998–2007); PD (since 2007)
- Other political affiliations: S&D
- Spouse: Valentina Castaldi
- Children: 1
- Education: Sapienza University of Rome
- Profession: University professor

Roberto Gualtieri (born 19 July 1966) is an Italian historian and politician of the Democratic Party (PD), incumbent Mayor of Rome since 2021 and Minister of Economy and Finances in the second government of Giuseppe Conte from 2019 until 2021. He previously was a Member of the European Parliament from 2009 to 2019, where he chaired the influential Economic and Monetary Affairs Committee within the Parliament from 2014 until 2019.

== Early life and career ==
Gualtieri was born in Rome in 1966. In 1992 he graduated in Literature and Philology at Sapienza University of Rome. In 1997, he obtained a Ph.D. in history at the Scuola Superiore di Studi Storici di San Marino. Gualtieri later became associate professor of Contemporary history at Sapienza University of Rome, where he had authored several books and articles on twentieth century Italian history and on the history of European integration.

== Political career ==
Since 2001, Gualtieri has been deputy director of the Gramsci Institute Foundation. In the same year, he became a member of Democrats of the Left (DS), the main social-democratic political party in Italy, direct heir of the Italian Communist Party.

In 2006, Gualtieri was among the founders of the Democratic Party (Congress of Orvieto, October 2006) and he was among the "wise men" who wrote its Manifesto. In 2007 he was elected to the National Assembly of the party and since 2008 he has been a member of its National board, where he was confirmed in 2014. Gualtieri voted against party leader Matteo Renzi in favour of post-communists both in 2013 and 2014 (the year Renzi won the leadership ballot).

From 2008 to 2011, Gualtieri served as director (with José Luis Rhi-Sausi) of the "Annual Report on European Integration" (published by Il Mulino). Since 2009, he is a member of the editorial committee of the Foundation "Italianieuropei".

=== Member of the European Parliament ===
In 2009, Gualtieri was appointed S&D Group coordinator for the Subcommittee on Security and Defence (SEDE) and standing rapporteur for the Common Foreign and Security Policy (CFSP) budget in the Committee on Budgets (BUDG). He was also a full member of the Committee on Constitutional Affairs (AFCO) and substitute of the Committee on Foreign Affairs (AFET). In 2010, he was appointed S&D Group negotiator within the EP negotiating team (with Elmar Brok and Guy Verhofstadt) on the creation of the European External Action Service. In addition to his committee assignments, he was part of the parliament's delegation for relations with the NATO Parliamentary Assembly between 2009 and 2014.

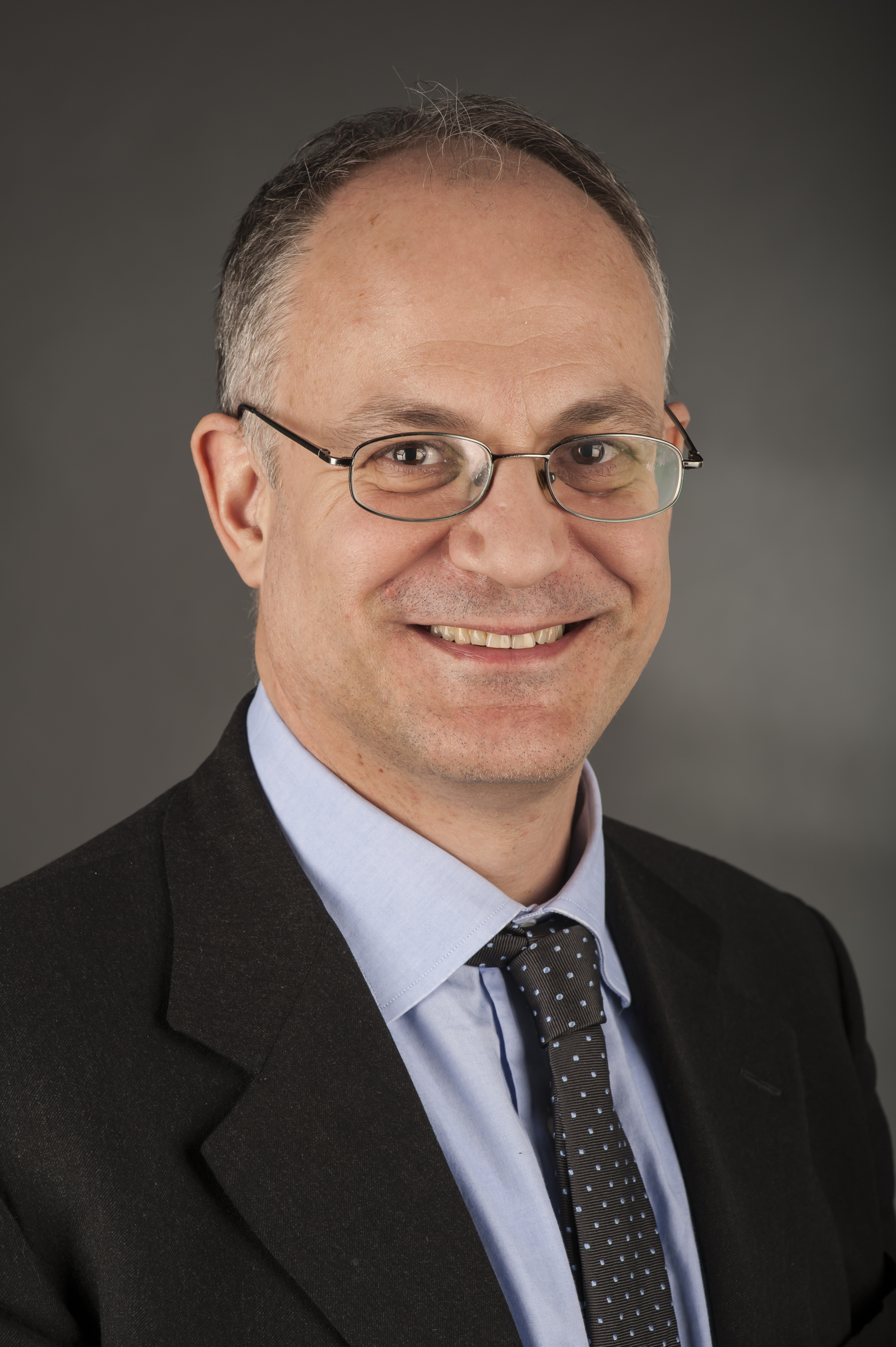
Gualtieri as a MEP in 2014

In December 2011, Gualtieri was part of the European Parliament negotiating team (with Brok, Verhofstadt and Daniel Cohn-Bendit) for the establishment of the "Fiscal Compact". In October 2012, he was designated "sherpa" negotiator for the European Parliament (with Brok, Verhofstadt and Cohn-Bendit) in the working group set up by Herman Van Rompuy on a Genuine Economic and Monetary Union. In 2013 he was co-rapporteur of the Report on constitutional problems of a multitier governance in the European Union with Rafał Trzaskowski. In 2013, he participated in the elaboration of the new Treaty for the European Union, with Brok, Verhofstaft, Cohn-Bendit, Andrew Duff and Jo Leinen, promoted by the "Spinelli Group", of which he is a member.

From 2013, Gualtieri was member of the Spinelli Group in the European Parliament, and he has been among the authors of the "Fundamental Law of the European Union" (with Elmar Brok, Guy Verhofstadt, Daniel Cohn-Bendit, Andrew Duff and Jo Leinen), published by the Bertelsmann Foundation.

Gualtieri led the EU-Election Observer Missions for the parliamentary election in Kosovo in 2014 and the 2013 municipal elections in Kosovo.

Following his re-election as an MEP in July 2014, Gualtieri was elected Chairman of the Committee on Economic and Monetary Affairs. On the committee, he served as rapporteur of several files, among which the Annual Banking Union report, statistical files, including the appointments of heads and board members of the European Central Bank, the Single Resolution Board, the European Banking Authority, the European Securities and Markets Authority, the European Insurance and Occupational Pensions Authority. He chaired the EP Financial Assistance Working Group, established in 2016 to monitor the implementation of third Greek financial assistance program, and the Committee's Banking Union Working Group.

From 2016, Gualtieri was also a member of the Committee of Inquiry to investigate alleged contraventions and maladministration in the application of Union law in relation to money laundering, tax avoidance and tax evasion. In addition, he was a member of the Transatlantic Legislators' Dialogue (TLD), the European Parliament Intergroup on Integrity (Transparency, Anti-Corruption and Organized Crime) and of the European Parliament Intergroup on LGBT Rights.

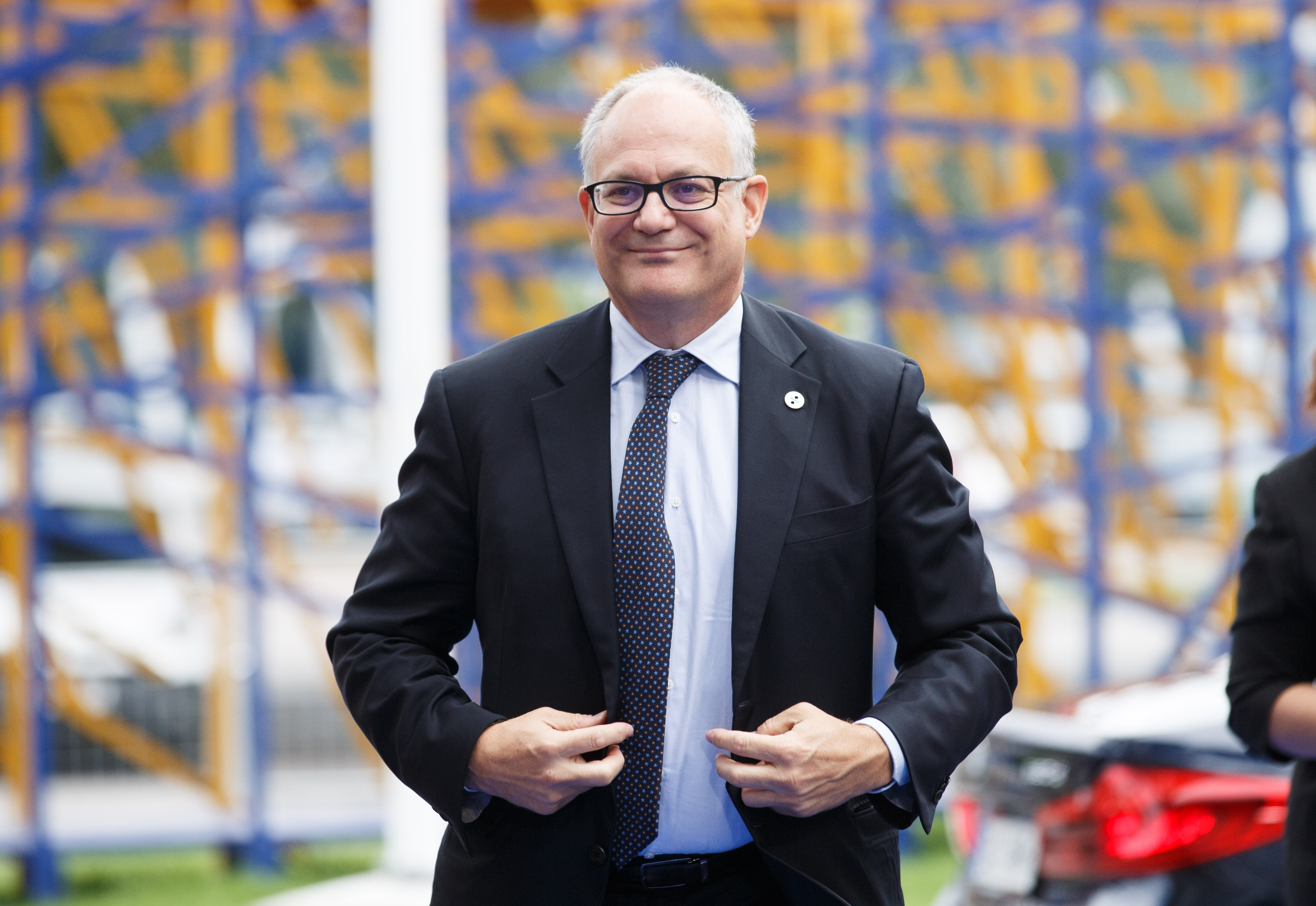
Roberto Gualtieri in Estonia, 2017

From 2017, Gualtieri served on the Parliament's so-called Brexit Steering Group, which works under the aegis of the Conference of Presidents and to coordinates Parliament's deliberations, considerations and resolutions on the UK's withdrawal from the EU. Within group, he was – together with Guy Verhofstadt and Elmar Brok – one of the Parliament's representatives at the European Council Sherpa meetings on Brexit.

Following the 2019 elections, Gualtieri was part of a cross-party working group in charge of drafting the European Parliament's five-year work program on economic and fiscal policies as well as trade.

Shortly after, Gualtieri was elected vice-chair of the S&D Group, under the leadership of chairwoman Iratxe García.

=== Minister of Economy and Finance ===
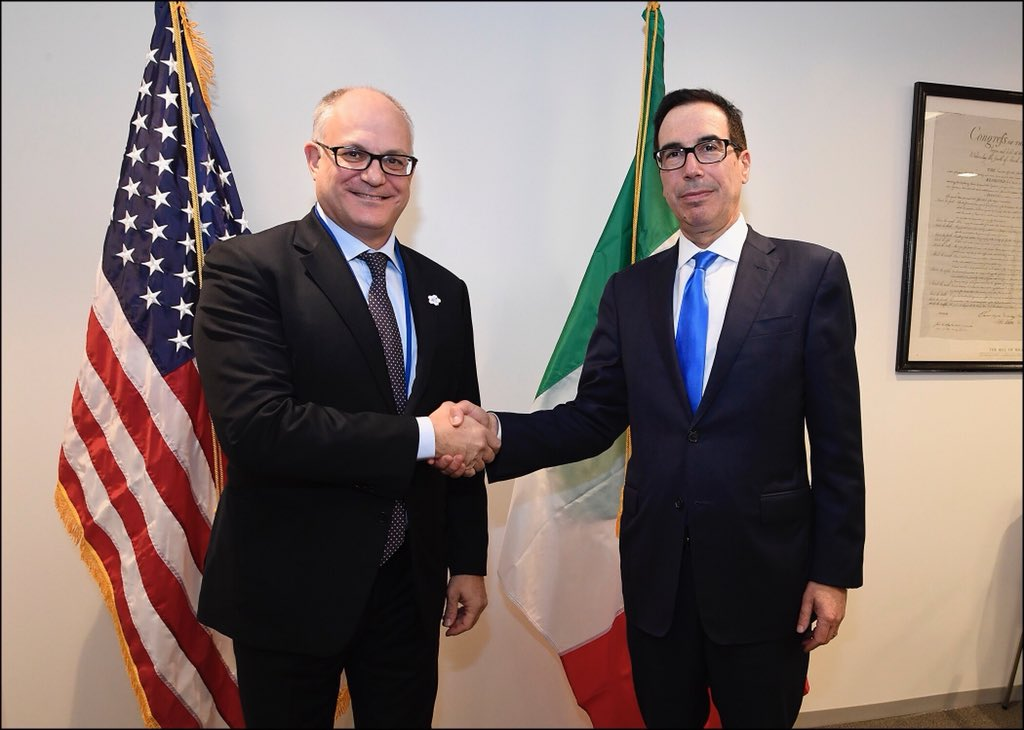
Gualtieri with U.S. Secretary of the Treasury, Steven Mnuchin

In August 2019 tensions grew within the populist government, leading to the issuing of a motion of no-confidence on Prime Minister Giuseppe Conte by the League. After Conte's resignation, the national board of the PD officially opened to the possibility of forming a new cabinet in a coalition with the M5S, based on pro-Europeanism, green economy, sustainable development, fight against economic inequality and a new immigration policy. The party also accepted that Conte may continue at the head of a new government, and on 29 August President Sergio Mattarella formally invested Conte to do so. On 5 September 2019 Gualtieri was appointed Minister of Economy and Finance.

On 26 January 2020, Gualtieri was picked by the centre-left coalition as its candidate at the incoming by-election in the constituency of Rome Quartiere Trionfale for the Chamber of Deputies. The by-election follows the resignation of Paolo Gentiloni from his seat in the Chamber after his appointment as European Commissioner for Economic and Financial Affairs in the von der Leyen Commission.

In July 2020, Gualtieri, along with Prime Minister Conte and Minister Vincenzo Amendola, played a key role in one of the longest European Councils in history. After days of harsh confrontations, the European leaders agreed on a new proposal by the President of the Council, Charles Michel, which provided a budget of €750 billion for the so-called Recovery Fund, composed of €390 billion in grants and €360 billion in loans. Italy would benefit from nearly €82 billion in grants and €127 billion in loans.

In January 2021, the centrist party Italia Viva withdrew its support for Conte's government. Although Conte was able to win confidence votes in the Parliament in the subsequent days, he chose to resign after failing to reach an absolute majority in the Senate. When negotiations to form Conte's third cabinet failed, the former President of the European Central Bank, Mario Draghi, formed a national unity government, in which Gualtieri was not confirmed as minister.

=== Mayor of Rome ===
On 9 May 2021, Gualtieri officially announced his candidacy as Mayor of Rome in the upcoming election. On 18 October, he defeated the centre-right candidate, Enrico Michetti, with 60.2% of votes. He took office on 21 October 2021.

== Political positions ==
Gualtieri is a social democrat and often describes himself as a Keynesian.

In 2016, the magazine Politico ranked Gualtieri as number 8 among 40 most influential MEPs.

== Personal life ==
Gualtieri is married and he has a son. He was once a semi-professional bossa nova musician who accompanied Brazilian singer Rosalia de Souza when she performed in Italy.

== Other activities ==
=== European Union institutions ===
- European Investment Bank (EIB), Ex-Officio Member of the Board of Governors (2019–2021)
- European Stability Mechanism (ESM), Member of the Board of Governors (2019–2021)

=== International organizations ===
- African Development Bank (AfDB), Ex-Officio Member of the Board of Governors (2019–2021)
- Asian Infrastructure Investment Bank (AIIB), Ex-Officio Member of the Board of Governors (2019–2021)
- European Bank for Reconstruction and Development (EBRD), Ex-Officio Member of the Board of Governors (2019–2021)
- International Monetary Fund (IMF), Ex-Officio Member of the Board of Governors (2019–2021)

=== Non-profit organizations ===
- New Pact for Europe, Member of the Advisory Group

== Electoral history ==
Election	House	Constituency	Party	Votes	Result
2009	European Parliament	Central Italy	PD	81,329	Elected
2014	European Parliament	Central Italy	PD	71,378	Elected
2019	European Parliament	Central Italy	PD	67,389	Elected
2020	Chamber of Deputies	Rome–Trionfale	PD	20,304	Elected

=== First-past-the-post elections ===
2020 Italian by-election (C): Rome — Trionfale
Candidate	Party	Votes	%
Roberto Gualtieri	Centre-left coalition	20,304	62.2
Maurizio Leo	Centre-right coalition	8,508	26.1
Rossella Rendina	Five Star Movement	1,422	4.4
Others		2,388	7.3
Total		32,622	100.0

Political offices
Preceded by Giovanni Tria	Italian Minister of Economy and Finance; 2019–2021	Succeeded by Daniele Franco
Preceded by Virginia Raggi	Mayor of Rome; 2021–present	Incumbent
