= Opinion polling for the 2016 Italian local elections =

In the run up to the Italian local elections of 2016, various organisations are carrying out opinion polling to gauge voting intention in Italy. Results of such polls are given in this article.

== Poll results ==
Poll results are listed in the tables below in reverse chronological order, showing the most recent first. The highest percentage figure in each polling survey is displayed in bold, and the background shaded in the leading party's or coalition's colour.

Under the Italian par condicio (equal conditions) law, publication of opinion polls is forbidden in the last two weeks of an electoral campaign.

== Bologna ==
=== Candidates ===
==== First round ====
Date	Polling firm	Merola	Borgonzoni	Bugani	Bernardini	Martelloni	Others	Lead
9–18 May 2016	Demos&Pi	**49.8**	17.7	16.5	10.3	4.7	1.0	32.1
2–5 May 2016	ScenariPolitici	**43.0**	28.5	16.0	—	7.0	5.5	14.5
27 April 2016	SWG	**47.0**	23.0	19.0	7.0	4.0	0.0	24.0
20–23 April 2016	ScenariPolitici	**43.0**	30.0	16.0	—	4.0	4.0	13.0
4–8 April 2016	Index Research	**42.0**	24.0	22.0	—	—	12.0	18.0

==== Second round ====
Merola vs. Borgonzoni

Date	Polling firm	Merola	Borgonzoni	Lead
9–18 May 2016	Demos&Pi	**67.6**	32.4	35.2
2–5 May 2016	ScenariPolitici	**55.5**	44.5	11.0
20–23 Apr 2016	ScenariPolitici	**55.0**	45.0	10.0

Merola vs. Bugani

Date	Polling firm	Merola	Bugani	Lead
9–18 May 2016	Demos&Pi	**65.7**	34.3	31.4
2–5 May 2016	ScenariPolitici	**56.0**	44.0	12.0
20–23 Apr 2016	ScenariPolitici	**57.0**	43.0	14.0

Merola vs. Bernardini

Date	Polling firm	Merola	Bernardini	Lead
9–18 May 2016	Demos&Pi	**67.2**	32.8	34.4

=== Parties ===
Date	Polling firm	PD	FI	LN	M5S	IB	CC	Others	Lead
9–18 May 2016	Demos&Pi	**40.2**	6.7	6.8	18.8	5.4	4.9	17.2	21.4
**15 May 2011**	**Election results**	**38.3**	**16.6**	**10.7**	**9.4**	—	—	**25.0**	**18.7**

== Milan ==
=== Candidates ===
==== First round ====
Date	Polling firm	Sala	Parisi	Corrado	Others	Lead
9–17 May 2016	Demos&Pi	39.2	35.8	13.3	11.7	2.4
11 May 2016	Tecnè	37.5	37.0	18.2	1.9	0.5
5–6 May 2016	Quorum	38.5	35.2	14.1	12.2	3.2
4–6 May 2016	Index Research	38.5	38.0	16.0	7.5	0.5
2–5 May 2016	ScenariPolitici	38.5	37.0	15.5	9.0	1.5
2 May 2016	Tecnè	38.0	37.5	16.5	8.0	0.5
27 Apr 2016	Tecnè	38.0	37.9	15.0	3.3	0.1
20–22 Apr 2016	ScenariPolitici	39.5	37.0	15.0	8.5	2.5
18 Apr 2016	Tecnè	38.0	**38.0**	16.0	8.0	0.0
16 Apr 2016	SWG	47.0	36.0	12.0	5.0	11.0
16 Apr 2016	Ipsos	38.8	37.1	16.5	7.6	1.7
4–8 Apr 2016	Index Research	37.0	36.0	14.0	13.0	1.0
12 Apr 2016	Eurometra	33.0	30.0	19.0	18.0	3.0
7 Apr 2016	Demopolis	40.0	37.0	14.0	9.0	3.0
1 Apr 2016	Termometropolitico	40.5	35.5	12.0	12.0	5.0
29 Mar 2016	Tecné	38.0	35.0	18.0	16.0	3.0
17 Mar 2016	Tecné	38.0	34.0	6.0	23.0	4.0
10–11 Mar 2016	Index Research	42.0	35.0	—	23.0	7.0
25 Feb 2016	Tecné	37.0	33.0	17.0	13.0	4.0

==== Second round ====
Date	Polling firm	Sala	Parisi	Lead
9–17 May 2016	Demos&Pi	**54.1**	45.9	8.2
11 May 2016	Tecnè	**50.2**	49.8	0.4
5–6 May 2016	Quorum	**52.4**	47.6	4.8
2–5 May 2016	ScenariPolitici	48.0	**52.0**	4.0
2 May 2016	Tecnè	**50.5**	49.5	1.0
16 Apr 2016	SWG	**57.0**	43.0	14.0
16 Apr 2016	Ipsos	**52.0**	48.0	4.0
4–8 Apr 2016	Index Research	**53.0**	47.0	6.0
17 Mar 2016	Tecné	**52.0**	48.0	4.0
10–11 Mar 2016	Index Research	**52.0**	48.0	4.0

=== Parties ===
Date	Polling firm	FI	PD	LN	SI	M5S	FdI	NCD	Others	Lead
9–17 May 2016	Demos&Pi	10.3	30.2	10.1	3.8	14.5	—	—	20.6	15.7
16 Apr 2016	SWG	12.0	32.0	11.5	5.5	15.0	2.5	2.5	19.0	17.0
16 Apr 2016	Ipsos	11.8	31.5	16.6	7.2	12.0	—	—	20.9	14.9
1 Apr 2016	TermometroPolitico	14.5	37.0	16.5	3.0	14.0	3.0	2.0	9.5	20.5
15 Feb 2016	TermometroPolitico	17.5	35.5	17.0	3.5	15.0	3.5	2.0	6.0	18.0
**15 May 2011**	**Election results**	**28.7**	28.6	**9.6**	**4.7**	**3.4**	—	—	**25.0**	**0.1**

== Naples ==
=== Candidates ===
==== First round ====
Date	Polling firm	De Magistris	Lettieri	Valente	Brambilla	Others	Lead
18–19 May 2016	IPR	38.0	23.0	20.0	13.0	5.0	15.0
17 May 2016	Tecnè	35.0	25.0	18.5	16.5	5.0	10.0
16–17 May 2016	IPR	37.0	24.0	21.0	13.0	5.0	13.0
9–17 May 2016	Demos&Pi	42.1	19.7	16.4	17.3	4.5	22.4
4–6 May 2016	Index Research	32.0	27.0	22.0	15.0	4.0	5.0
5 May 2016	ScenariPolitici	39.0	23.0	20.0	13.0	5.0	16.0
2 May 2016	Tecnè	32.0	27.0	19.5	16.5	5.0	5.0
28 April 2016	ScenariPolitici	38.0	23.0	21.0	14.0	4.0	15.0
27–28 April 2016	Euromedia	35.5	25.0	21.0	16.0	3.5	10.5
20–23 April 2016	ScenariPolitici	34.0	28.0	20.0	12.0	6.0	6.0
19 April 2016	Tecnè	31.0	28.0	21.0	16.0	4.0	6.0
14–15 March 2016	Tecnè	32.0	28.0	19.0	19.0	2.0	4.0

==== Second round ====
De Magistris vs. Lettieri

Date	Polling firm	De Magistris	Lettieri	Lead
17 May 2016	Tecnè	55.0	45.0	10.0
16–17 May 2016	IPR	55.0	45.0	10.0
9–17 May 2016	Demos&Pi	62.9	37.1	25.8
5 May 2016	ScenariPolitici	58.0	42.0	16.0
2 May 2016	Tecnè	52.5	47.5	5.0
28 April 2016	ScenariPolitici	63.0	37.0	26.0
20–23 April 2016	ScenariPolitici	59.0	41.0	18.0
19 April 2016	Tecnè	52.0	48.0	4.0

De Magistris vs. Valente

Date	Polling firm	De Magistris	Valente	Lead
9–17 May 2016	Demos&Pi	**63.5**	36.5	27.0
5 May 2016	ScenariPolitici	**60.0**	40.0	20.0
28 April 2016	ScenariPolitici	**58.0**	42.0	16.0
20–23 April 2016	ScenariPolitici	**56.0**	44.0	12.0

De Magistris vs. Brambilla

Date	Polling firm	De Magistris	Brambilla	Lead
9–17 May 2016	Demos&Pi	**64.9**	35.1	29.8
5 May 2016	ScenariPolitici	**63.0**	37.0	26.0
28 April 2016	ScenariPolitici	**60.0**	40.0	20.0
20–23 April 2016	ScenariPolitici	**58.0**	42.0	16.0

== Rome ==
=== Candidates ===
==== First round ====
Date	Polling firm	Giachetti	Bertolaso	Raggi	Meloni	Marchini	Fassina	Storace	Others	Lead
19 May 2016	Tecnè	24.0	—	**29.9**	19.0	17.4	5.1	—	4.6	5.9
18–19 May 2016	IPR	24.0	—	**29.0**	21.0	19.0	4.0	—	4.0	5.0
17–19 May 2016	ScenariPolitici	25.0	—	**27.0**	19.0	18.5	7.5	—	3.0	2.0
17–18 May 2016	IZI SpA	24.3	—	**26.3**	24.1	15.5	6.2	—	3.6	2.0
9–18 May 2016	Demos&Pi	24.5	—	**30.5**	23.1	11.4	8.1	—	2.4	6.0
16–17 May 2016	IPR	24.0	—	**26.0**	21.0	20.0	3.0	—	6.0	2.0
12–13 May 2016	Quorum	24.7	—	**30.5**	21.1	18.4	4.3	—	1.0	5.8
7–12 May 2016	TermometroPolitico	**30.5**	—	29.5	14.0	18.5	—	—	7.5	1.0
11 May 2016	Tecnè	27.1	—	**30.2**	19.8	19.0	—	—	3.9	3.1
9 May 2016	Deligo	25.3	—	**31.2**	24.1	16.9	—	—	2.5	5.9
6 May 2016	TermometroPolitico	**29.5**	—	28.5	14.5	16.5	6.0	—	5.0	1.0
4–6 May 2016	Index Research	22.0	—	**28.0**	20.0	19.0	7.5	—	3.5	6.0
3–5 May 2016	ScenariPolitici	23.5	—	**26.5**	19.5	19.5	6.5	—	4.5	3.0
2 May 2016	Tecnè	20.5	—	**28.5**	20.0	19.5	7.0	—	4.5	8.5
2 May 2016	Index Research	24.5	—	**26.7**	19.5	19.5	7.0	—	2.8	2.2
28 Apr 2016	Tecnè	21.5	—	**27.6**	20.0	20.9	5.6	1.6	2.8	6.1
20–22 Apr 2016	IZI SpA	22.4	7.4	**28.2**	24.0	9.0	6.6	2.4	0.0	4.2
19 Apr 2016	Tecnè	20.0	—	**27.0**	21.0	21.0	6.0	2.0	3.0	6.0
19 Apr 2016	Tecnè	21.0	11.0	**26.0**	20.0	10.0	7.0	3.0	2.0	5.0
4–8 Apr 2016	Index Research	24.5	8.1	**27.4**	17.6	10.4	6.8	3.2	2.0	1.9
22–24 Mar 2016	ScenariPolitici	**26.6**	10.5	25.0	17.7	8.9	6.4	4.0	0.9	1.6
14–15 Mar 2016	ScenariPolitici	24.0	15.0	**25.0**	14.0	10.0	8.0	2.0	2.0	1.0
14–15 Mar 2016	ScenariPolitici	24.0	**25.0**	**25.0**	—	11.0	8.0	5.0	2.0	0.0
10–11 Mar 2016	Index Research	30.0	15.0	**33.0**	—	10.0	5.0	7.0	0.0	3.0

==== Second round ====
Giachetti vs. Raggi

Date	Polling firm	Giachetti	Raggi	Lead
19 May 2016	Tecnè	42.8	57.2	14.4
17–19 May 2016	ScenariPolitici	40.0	60.0	20.0
9–18 May 2016	Demos&Pi	45.8	54.2	8.4
17 May 2016	Tecnè	43.0	57.0	14.0
16–17 May 2016	IPR	42.0	58.0	16.0
12–13 May 2016	Quorum	42.2	57.8	15.6
11 May 2016	Tecnè	40.6	59.4	18.8
3–5 May 2016	ScenariPolitici	40.0	60.0	20.0
2 May 2016	Tecnè	40.0	60.0	20.0
2 May 2016	Index Research	45.0	55.0	10.0
28 Apr 2016	Tecnè	39.9	60.1	20.2
20–23 Apr 2016	ScenariPolitici	39.0	61.0	22.0
19 Apr 2016	Tecnè	41.0	59.0	18.0
17–18 Apr 2016	Index Research	44.0	56.0	12.0

Meloni vs. Raggi

Date	Polling firm	Meloni	Raggi	Lead
19 May 2016	Tecnè	45.2	**54.8**	9.6
17–19 May 2016	ScenariPolitici	**50.5**	49.5	1.0
9–18 May 2016	Demos&Pi	43.3	**56.7**	13.4
17 May 2016	Tecnè	46.5	**53.5**	7.0
16–17 May 2016	IPR	48.0	**52.0**	4.0
12–13 May 2016	Quorum	42.2	**57.8**	15.6
11 May 2016	Tecnè	45.6	**54.4**	8.8
3–5 May 2016	ScenariPolitici	**51.0**	49.0	2.0
2 May 2016	Tecnè	47.0	**53.0**	6.0
2 May 2016	Index Research	49.0	**51.0**	2.0
28 Apr 2016	Tecnè	47.1	**52.9**	5.8
20–23 Apr 2016	ScenariPolitici	**51.5**	48.5	3.0
19 Apr 2016	Tecnè	48.0	**52.0**	4.0

Marchini vs. Raggi

Date	Polling firm	Marchini	Raggi	Lead
19 May 2016	Tecnè	45.9	**54.1**	8.2
17–19 May 2016	ScenariPolitici	48.0	**52.0**	4.0
17 May 2016	Tecnè	48.0	**52.0**	4.0
16–17 May 2016	IPR	**51.0**	49.0	2.0
12–13 May 2016	Quorum	34.5	**65.5**	31.0
11 May 2016	Tecnè	46.6	**53.4**	6.8
3–5 May 2016	ScenariPolitici	**51.0**	49.0	2.0
2 May 2016	Tecnè	48.5	**51.5**	3.0
2 May 2016	Index Research	**51.0**	49.0	2.0
28 Apr 2016	Tecnè	49.6	**50.4**	0.8
19 Apr 2016	Tecnè	**50.0**	**50.0**	0.0

=== Parties ===
Date	Polling firm	PD	FI	M5S	LM	SI	FdI	LS	LcS	AP	Others	Lead
9–18 May 2016	Demos&Pi	22.3	7.4	**32.2**	5.4	3.7	8.5	—	3.2	—	4.3	9.9
7–12 May 2016	TermometroPolitico	24.5	6.5	**28.5**	10.5	—	11.0	2.0	1.5	—	15.5	4.0
6 May 2016	TermometroPolitico	27.0	6.5	**28.0**	9.0	6.0	11.0	2.0	2.5	0.5	7.5	1.0
1–3 Mar 2016	ScenariPolitici	**28.9**	7.9	24.3	6.5	4.7	10.7	5.6	4.9	1.9	4.6	4.6
9–11 Feb 2016	ScenariPolitici	**28.6**	7.7	27.6	7.2	4.4	12.3	3.1	4.1	1.0	2.5	1.0
18–24 Jan 2016	TermometroPolitico	26.3	6.9	**29.1**	8.2	3.9	8.5	—	5.2	1.2	10.7	2.8
**6 May 2013**	**Election results**	**26.3**	**19.2**	**12.8**	**7.5**	**6.3**	**5.9**	**1.3**	—	—	**20.7**	**7.1**

== Turin ==
=== Candidates ===
==== First round ====
Date	Polling firm	Fassino	Appendino	Morano	Napoli	Airaudo	Rosso	Others	Lead
18–19 May 2016	IPR	41.0	29.0	9.0	8.0	7.0	3.0	3.0	12.0
17 May 2016	Tecnè	38.5	30.0	9.0	8.0	7.5	1.5	5.0	8.5
16–17 May 2016	IPR	40.0	29.0	9.0	8.0	6.0	2.0	6.0	11.0
9–17 May 2016	Demos&Pi	42.5	23.1	7.3	9.9	7.3	7.5	2.4	19.4
4–6 May 2016	Index Research	39.5	30.0	9.0	8.0	9.0	2.0	2.5	9.5
2–5 May 2016	ScenariPolitici	45.0	25.5	11.5	5.0	8.0	4.0	1.0	19.5
2 May 2016	Tencè	39.0	31.5	9.5	8.5	7.5	2.0	2.0	7.5
20–23 Apr 2016	ScenariPolitici	47.0	23.0	12.0	5.0	8.0	4.0	1.0	24.0
19 Apr 2016	Tencè	41.0	30.0	11.0	9.0	7.0	1.0	1.0	11.0

==== Second round ====
Fassino vs. Appendino

Date	Polling firm	Fassino	Appendino	Lead
17 May 2016	Tecnè	52.0	48.0	4.0
16–17 May 2016	IPR	51.5	48.5	3.0
9–17 May 2016	Demos&Pi	56.8	43.2	13.6
2–5 May 2016	ScenariPolitici	52.5	47.5	5.0
2 May 2016	Tecnè	51.5	48.5	3.0
20–23 Apr 2016	ScenariPolitici	54.0	46.0	8.0
19 Apr 2016	Tecnè	52.0	48.0	4.0

Fassino vs. Morano

Date	Polling firm	Fassino	Morano	Lead
2–5 May 2016	ScenariPolitici	**61.0**	39.0	22.0
20–23 Apr 2016	ScenariPolitici	**62.0**	38.0	24.0
