= Virginia Raggi =

Italian lawyer and politician (born 1978)

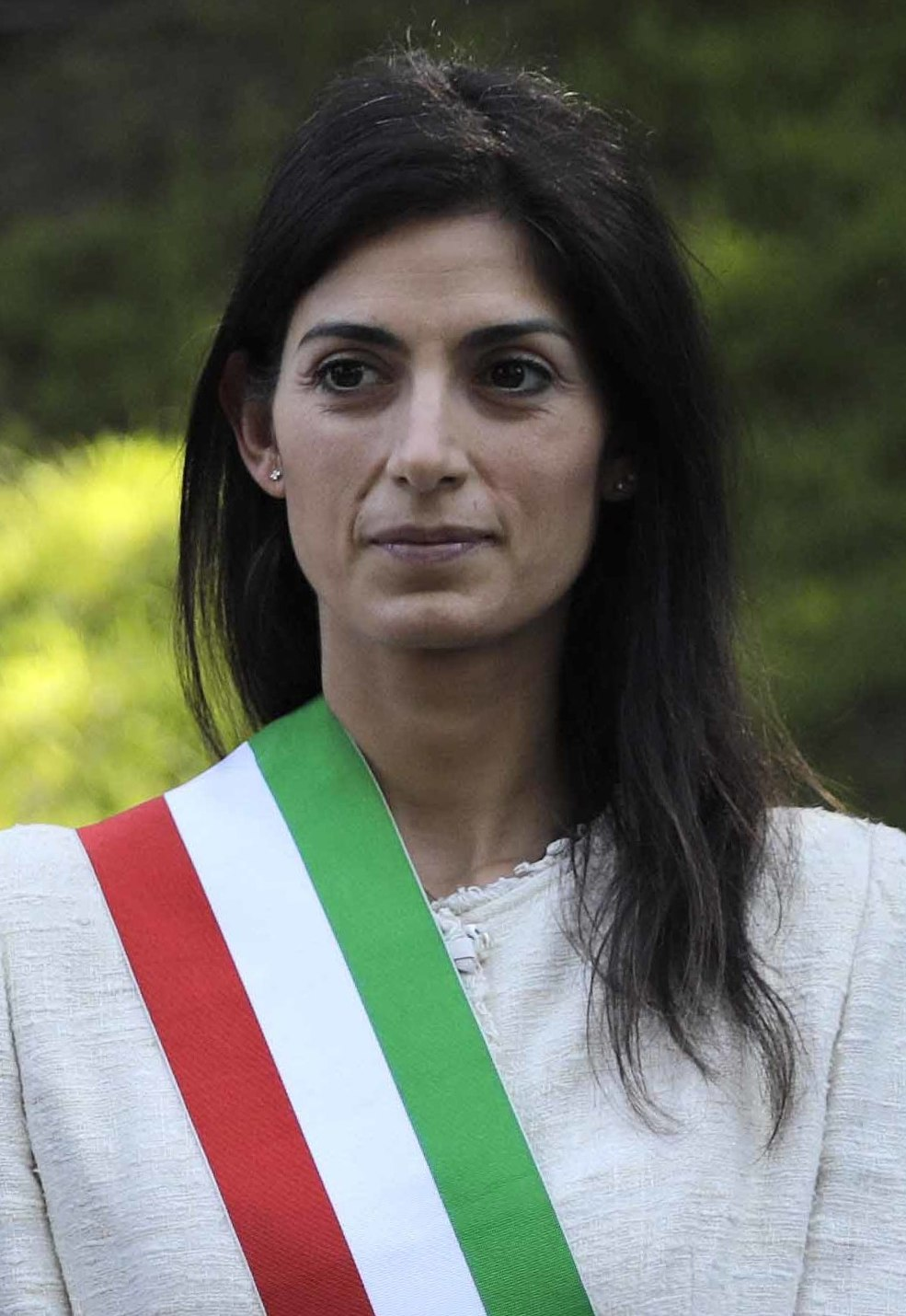

Mayor of Rome
- In office 22 June 2016 – 21 October 2021
- Preceded by: Ignazio Marino
- Succeeded by: Roberto Gualtieri

Personal details
- Born: Virginia Elena Raggi; 18 July 1978 (age 48) Rome, Italy
- Party: Five Star Movement
- Spouse: Andrea Severini (m. 2008)
- Children: 1
- Education: Roma Tre University
- Occupation: Lawyer

Virginia Elena Raggi (Italian pronunciation: [virˈdʒiːnja ˈraddʒi]; born 18 July 1978) is an Italian lawyer and politician who served as Mayor of Rome from 2016 to 2021. A member of the anti-establishment Five Star Movement (M5S), Raggi was first elected to the Rome city council in 2013. Raggi led her party to victory in the 2016 municipal election, becoming the first woman and first M5S member elected mayor of Rome. Following the defeat of the M5S in the 2021 Rome municipal election, Raggi left office as mayor.

== Background ==
Raggi was born and raised in the Appio-Latino quarter of Rome, and studied law at the Roma Tre University, specialising in judicial and extrajudicial civil law. Despite not having any prior political experience, she credits the birth of her son for sparking her involvement in politics. She was previously a member of local neighborhood boards before joining the Five Star Movement for Rome district XIV in 2011. At the time of her election Raggi lived with her family in Ottavia in Northern Rome. She is married to fellow M5S member Andrea Severini with whom she has one child, born in 2009.

== Rome City Council and the 2016 election ==
In the 2013 municipal election, Raggi was one of four members of the Five Star Movement elected to Rome city council. The maximum term of office lasts five years, but the resignation of mayor Ignazio Marino (a member of the Democratic Party) triggered early elections; Marino was ousted from office after more than half the city's councillors stepped down.

Raggi won the closed primary (against Marcello De Vito — the party's 2013 nominee to the office of mayor — and other minor candidates) in preparation for the upcoming June 2016 Rome municipal early election. Described by The Economist as "a talented debater", Raggi is the first female mayor of the city. She "promised to fight corruption and bring back Rome's splendor a year after a wide-reaching scandal exposed criminal infiltration in city bidding contracts". Raggi opposed the Rome bid for the 2024 Summer Olympics arguing that the city was in a "delicate moment" pointing out the spiralling deficits in Olympic cities.

Raggi and her party (Five Star Movement, M5S) came in first place in the first round of voting (5 June 2016) in the Rome mayoral election, garnering over 35 percent of the vote. In the second round of voting (19 June 2016), Raggi opposed Roberto Giachetti, a member of the Democratic Party (PD) and Vice President of the Chamber of Deputies in the XVII Legislature, who obtained over 24 percent of the vote in first round. Raggi won the second round with 67.2 percent of or slightly over 770,000 votes; she is the first woman and the first member of M5S to hold the office of Mayor of Rome.

== Mayor of Rome ==
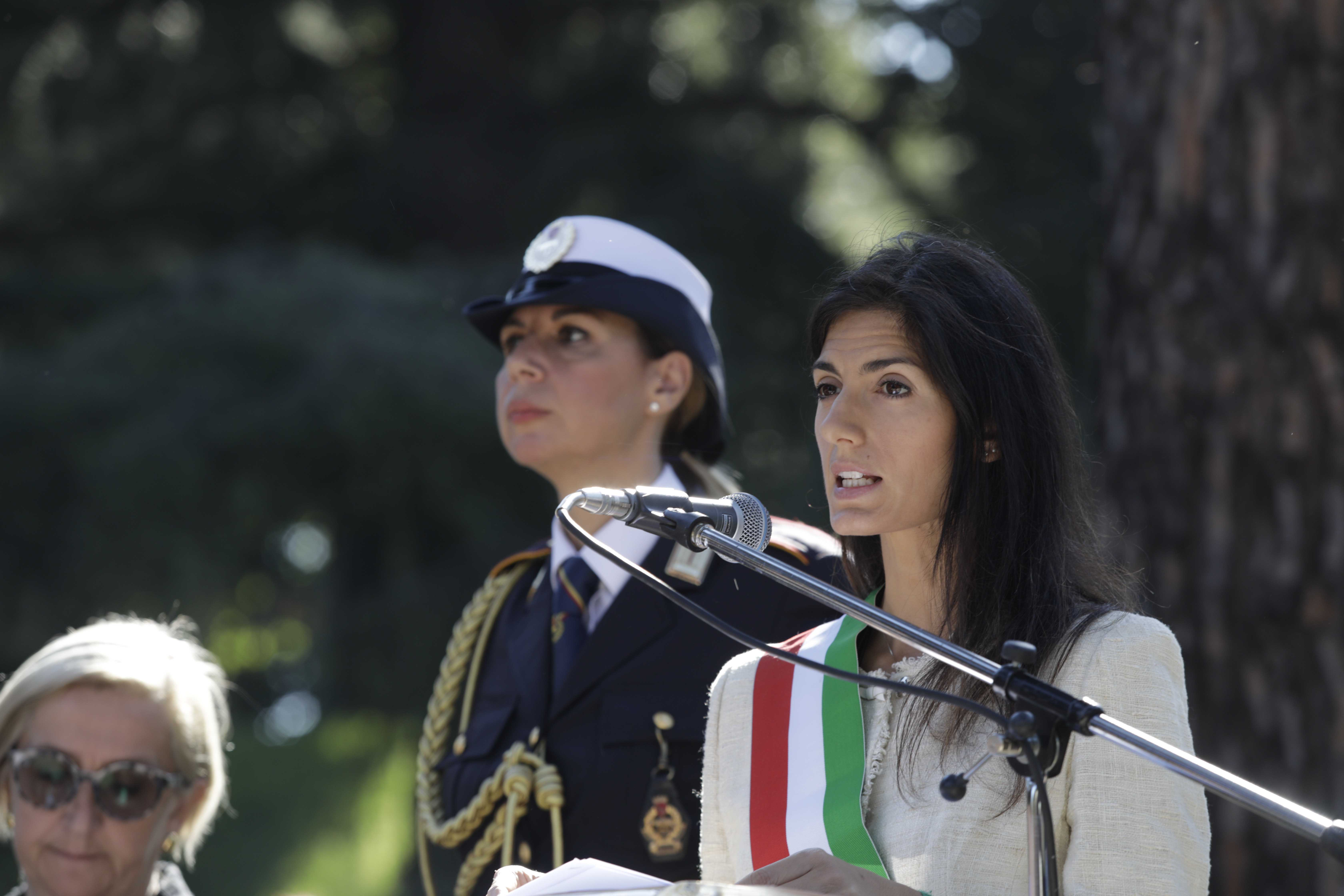
Virginia Raggi during a public speech as mayor of Rome

One of Raggi's first acts as mayor was the withdrawal of the 2024 Olympic bid stating that "with 13 billion euros in debt, Rome can't afford taking on more debt to make cathedrals in the desert". Raggi's decision also crippled the Italian bid to host the 2023 Rugby World Cup. FIR's (Italian rugby federation) bid, indeed, relied on IOC's financial contribution to the renewal of the venues which would have hosted the Olympics' football tournament and that would have been seat also of the Rugby World Cup (except for Verona, substituted by Padua). After Raggi's withdrawal of the bid, FIR president Alfredo Gavazzi announced that there were no longer the conditions to keep on supporting the Italian bid for the World Cup.

That position was heavily contested: critics argued that withdrawing the bid wasted the chance of renewing the 1960 Olympic infrastructures with little or no expense, as the funds would have been provided by the IOC (1.5 billion euros), private investors (910 million euros), and the Italian Government (3,2 billion); according to a study from the University Tor Vergata, not hosting the Olympics caused a loss of 7.1 billion gross revenue and also an estimated loss of 40,000 job opportunities. However, a 2021 paper by the US Council on Foreign Relations on the experience of host cities noted that "a growing number of economists argue that the benefits of hosting the games are at best exaggerated and at worst nonexistent . . . Impact studies carried out or commissioned by host governments before the games often argue that hosting the event will provide a major economic lift by creating jobs, drawing tourists, and boosting overall economic output. However, research carried out after the games shows that these purported benefits are dubious."

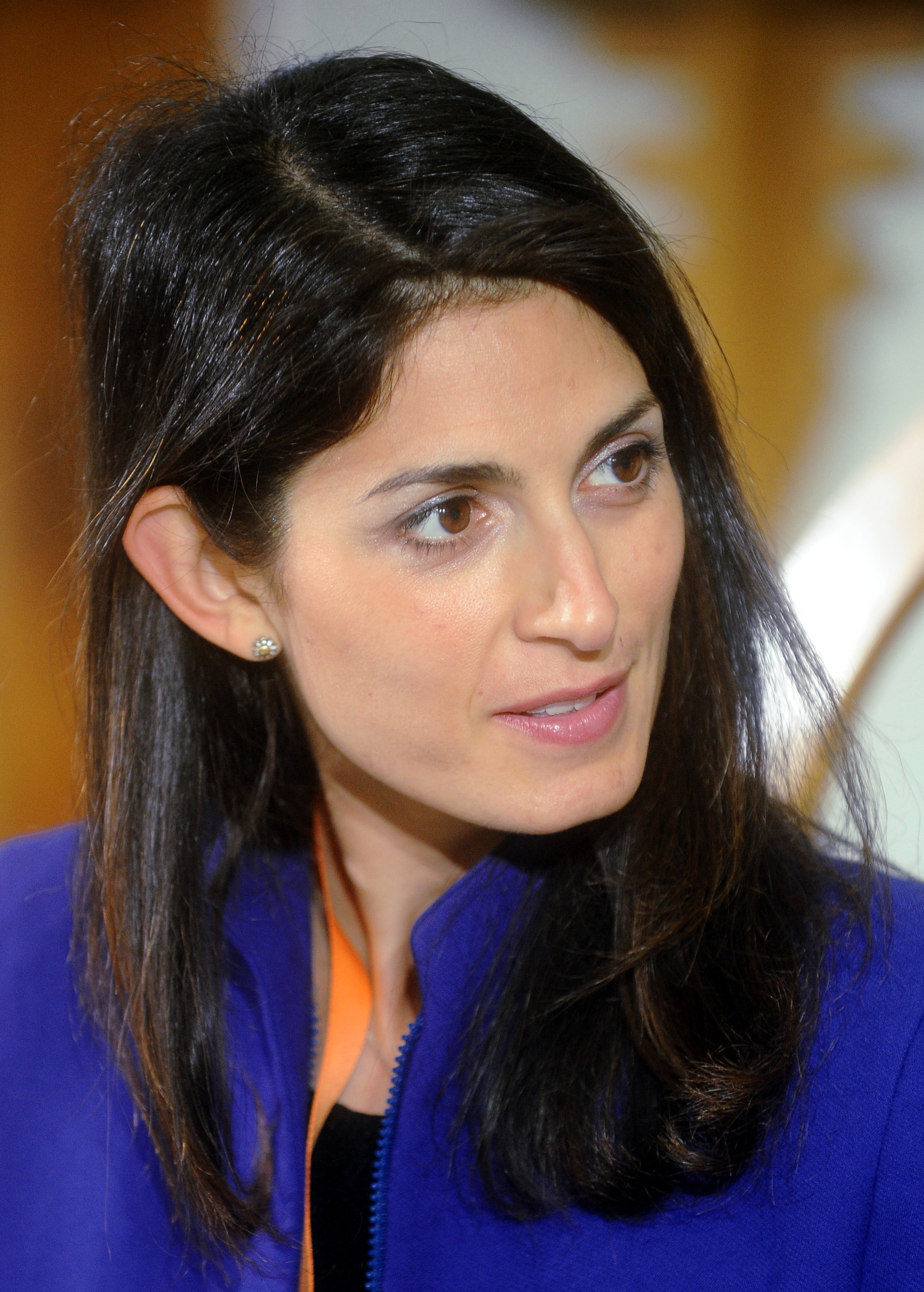
Raggi in 2016

In February 2017, Raggi was put under investigation for two cases of malfeasance in office with regard to decisions on staffing of her private office. However, despite the charges on 10 November 2018 the Court dropped all charges against her due to no motive on her behalf, but instead citing Raffaele Marra as responsible for the illegal hirings. In December 2017 she confirmed that she would not run for another term in 2021, according to an internal rule of her party that allows only two elected terms. On 11 August 2020, Raggi stated that she would stand for re-election. Three days later M5S members voted to remove the rule banning members from serving more than two terms. Under her tenure both public transport and waste management were criticed due to poor quality of passenger service and waste collection. As of July 2018 more than 30 buses had caught fire since January 2017 because of poor or no maintenance. The event has become so common that the press reports that every time a bus explodes in Rome the first thing people think of is a lack of maintenance by Atac—Rome's public transport company—rather than a terrorist attack.

A ballot was proposed by the Italian Radicals following the petition signed by 33,000 inhabitants of the city to assign via public tender the public transport service to private contractors in order to provide a more efficient service, but Raggi postponed it first to June 2018 from the initial date of 4 March that year, and then indefinitely in autumn 2018. Although many people in Rome were not happy with her handling of the ATAC bus situation in Rome and wanted change, only 16.3% voted in the 12 November 2018 ballot, failing to meet the minimum 33.3% needed for approval and leaving the bus service in public hands. From January 2019, tourist buses were banned from the centre of Rome.

In 2018, news media reported that the average wait time for waste collection had increased to 2–3 weeks, causing carrion crows, bugs, rats, seagulls and even wild boars to proliferate. The Casamonica clan, associated with racketeering, extortion and usury for decades, illegally built garishly decorated villas. Illegally built villas in the Quadraro district were demolished in 2018 during the mayoralty of Raggi. In March 2019, Raggi faced calls for her resignation after three of Rome's metro stations were closed due to concerns about malfunctioning escalators following an incident in October 2018.

In a September 2017 opinion poll on the approval rating of local administrators, Raggi was rated 88th, with 44.4% approval. From the 2018 Quality of Life in Italy survey jointly conducted by Italia Oggi, a financial newspaper, and Roma Tre University it emerged that since the previous survey in 2017 the perceived quality of life in Rome under the administration of Raggi had dropped 18 places, from 67th to 85th, making Rome the biggest faller in that ranking. In June 2019, Raggi stated that 12 million euros would be spent on improving the city's parks and gardens.

== Controversy ==
In 2017, Raggi proposed to collect the coins in the Trevi Fountain and use that money towards the funding of the city. After the backlash the Raggi administration faced she instead scrapped the idea and let the money continue going to charity. On 14 May 2024, Raggi was sent to trial on charges of slander in reference to some statements she made against the former CEO of AMA, the municipal waste company in Rome, Lorenzo Bagnacani. The trial will start on 11 September 2024.

Political offices
Preceded by Ignazio Marino	Mayor of Rome; 2016–2021	Succeeded by Roberto Gualtieri
Party political offices
Preceded by Marcello De Vito (2013)	Five Star Movement nominee for Mayor of Rome; 2016, 2021	Succeeded by TBD
