= 2013 Rome municipal election =

- 26–27 May 2013 (first round); 9–10 June 2013 (second round)
- Turnout: 52.8% ▼20.9 pp (first round); 45.0% ▼7.8 pp (second round)
- Mayoral election
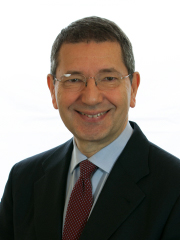

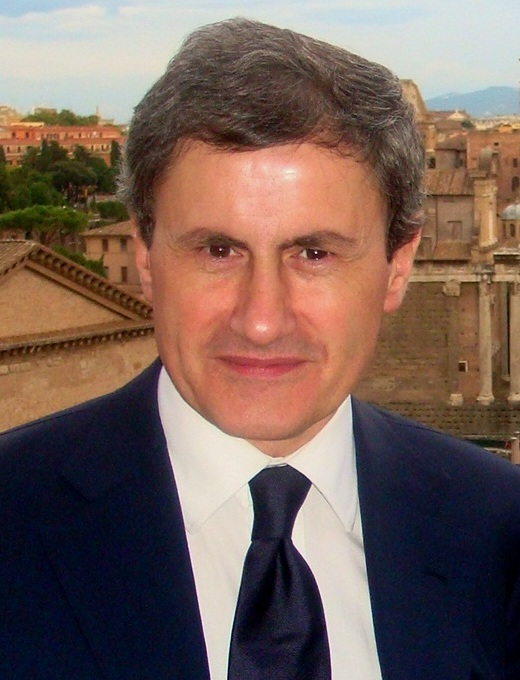
Candidate	Ignazio Marino	Gianni Alemanno
Party	PD	PdL
Alliance	Centre-left	Centre-right
1st Round vote	512,720	364,337
Percentage	42.6%	30.3%
2nd Round vote	664,490	374,883
Percentage	63.9%	36.1%
Mayor before election
Gianni Alemanno
PdL
Elected mayor
Ignazio Marino
PD
- City Council election
- All 48 seats in the Capitoline Assembly; 25 seats needed for a majority
Party	Leader	Vote %	Seats	+/–
Centre-left	Ignazio Marino	42.57	29	+7
Centre-right	Gianni Alemanno	31.73	12	−24
Five Star Movement	Marcello De Vito	12.82	4	
Others			3	
This lists parties that won seats. See the complete results below.

Municipal elections were held in Rome on 26–27 May and 9–10 June 2013 to elect the Mayor of Rome and 48 members of the City Council, as well as the fifteen presidents and more than 400 councillors of the 15 municipi in which the municipality is divided.

In March 2013 the City Council cut down the number of municipi of the city from 19 to 15, reorganizing the local administrative areas. Also the number of the members of the City Council was reduced from 60 to 48.

The outgoing Mayor Gianni Alemanno (PdL) stood in the election for a second term. The centre-left coalition candidate, heart surgeon Ignazio Marino (PD), was chosen by a multi-party primary election on 7 April 2013. Since none of the candidates obtained the majority of votes on the first round, a second round vote was held on 9–10 June 2013. As a result, Ignazio Marino was elected mayor by a landslide.

The elections saw about 400,000 votes less than the previous municipal elections with one of the lowest turnout ever registered in Rome.

== Background ==
Despite Alemanno had repeatedly stated its intention to hold primary elections to choose the candidate of the centre-right coalition, on 2 September 2012 he announced his intention to run for a second term as Mayor of Rome.

=== Centre-left primary election ===
The centre-left coalition decided to hold the primary election on 7 April 2013 to decide its mayoral candidate. There were 6 main candidates: five from Democratic Party and one from Left Ecology Freedom.

Among the most popular candidates there were Ignazio Marino, heart surgeon and senator, who was candidate in the 2009 Democratic Party leadership election; David Sassoli, journalist and MEP since 2009; and Paolo Gentiloni, former Minister of Communication in the Prodi II Cabinet. On 7 April Marino won the election and became the official candidate of the centre-left coalition.

Candidate	Supported by	Votes (%)
Ignazio Marino	PD	51%
David Sassoli	PD	28%
Paolo Gentiloni	PD	14%
Patrizia Prestipino	PD	2%
Gemma Azumi	SEL	2%
Mattia Di Tommaso	PD	2%
Total		100.00

== Voting System ==
The voting system is used for all mayoral elections in Italy, in the city with a population higher than 15,000 inhabitants. Under this system voters express a direct choice for the mayor or an indirect choice voting for the party of the candidate's coalition. If no candidate receives 50% of the votes, the top two candidates go to a second round after two weeks. This gives a result whereby the winning candidate may be able to claim majority support, although it is not guaranteed.

For municipi the voting system is the same, not referred to the mayor but to the president of the municipio.

The election of the City Council is based on a direct choice for the candidate with a preference vote: the candidate with the majority of the preferences is elected. The number of the seats for each party is determined proportionally.

== Parties and candidates ==
This is a list of the major parties (and their respective leaders) which participated in the election.

Political party or alliance	Constituent lists	Candidate
Left-wing coalition	Left for Rome	Sandro Medici
Left-wing coalition	Roman Republic	Sandro Medici
Left-wing coalition	Pirate Party	Sandro Medici
Centre-left coalition	Democratic Party	Ignazio Marino
Centre-left coalition	Left Ecology Freedom	Ignazio Marino
Centre-left coalition	Federation of the Greens	Ignazio Marino
Centre-left coalition	Democratic Centre	Ignazio Marino
Centre-left coalition	Italian Socialist Party	Ignazio Marino
Centre-left coalition	Marino for Mayor	Ignazio Marino
Five Star Movement		Marcello De Vito
Marchini coalition	Marchini for Mayor	Alfio Marchini
Marchini coalition	Let's Change with Rome	Alfio Marchini
Centre-right coalition	The People of Freedom	Gianni Alemanno
Centre-right coalition	Brothers of Italy	Gianni Alemanno
Centre-right coalition	The Right	Gianni Alemanno
Centre-right coalition	Others	Gianni Alemanno

== Results ==
Summary of the 2013 Rome City Council and Mayoral election results
Candidates	1st round		2nd round		Leader's seat	Parties	Votes	%	Seats
Candidates	Votes	%	Votes	%	Leader's seat	Parties	Votes	%	Seats
Ignazio Marino	512,720	42.61	664,490	63.93	–	Democratic Party	267,605	26.26	19
Ignazio Marino	512,720	42.61	664,490	63.93	–	Marino for Mayor	75,494	7.41	5
Ignazio Marino	512,720	42.61	664,490	63.93	–	Left Ecology Freedom	63,728	6.25	4
Ignazio Marino	512,720	42.61	664,490	63.93	–	Democratic Centre	14,735	1.45	1
Ignazio Marino	512,720	42.61	664,490	63.93	–	Federation of the Greens	6,299	0.62	–
Ignazio Marino	512,720	42.61	664,490	63.93	–	Italian Socialist Party	5,853	0.57	–
Ignazio Marino	512,720	42.61	664,490	63.93	–	Total	433,714	42.57	29
Gianni Alemanno	364,337	30.28	374,883	36.07	check	The People of Freedom	195,749	19.21	7
Gianni Alemanno	364,337	30.28	374,883	36.07	check	Brothers of Italy	60,375	5.93	2
Gianni Alemanno	364,337	30.28	374,883	36.07	check	Citizens for Rome	50,239	4.93	2
Gianni Alemanno	364,337	30.28	374,883	36.07	check	The Right	13,256	1.30	–
Gianni Alemanno	364,337	30.28	374,883	36.07	check	Italian Union Movement	2,036	0.20	–
Gianni Alemanno	364,337	30.28	374,883	36.07	check	Italian Blues	1,617	0.16	–
Gianni Alemanno	364,337	30.28	374,883	36.07	check	Total	323,272	31.73	11
Marcello De Vito	149,665	12.44	–	–	check	Five Star Movement	130,635	12.82	3
Alfio Marchini	114,169	9.49	–	–	check	Alfio Marchini for Mayor	76,203	7.48	2
Alfio Marchini	114,169	9.49	–	–	check	Let's Change with Rome	3,404	0.33	–
Alfio Marchini	114,169	9.49	–	–	check	Total	79,607	7.81	2
Sandro Medici	26,825	2.23	–	–	–	Left for Rome	11,629	1.14	–
Sandro Medici	26,825	2.23	–	–	–	Roman Republic	7,940	0.78	–
Sandro Medici	26,825	2.23	–	–	–	Pirate Rome	715	0.07	–
Sandro Medici	26,825	2.23	–	–	–	Total	20,284	1.99	–
Alfonso Luigi Marra	14,307	1.19	–	–	–	Talking Cricket List – No Euro	6,552	0.64	–
Alfonso Luigi Marra	14,307	1.19	–	–	–	Forza Roma	1,416	0.14	–
Alfonso Luigi Marra	14,307	1.19	–	–	–	No to the closure of hospitals	1,304	0.13	–
Alfonso Luigi Marra	14,307	1.19	–	–	–	Environmental Animalists	1,004	0.10	–
Alfonso Luigi Marra	14,307	1.19	–	–	–	Pensions and Dignity	995	0.10	–
Alfonso Luigi Marra	14,307	1.19	–	–	–	Let's halve the salary for politicians	901	0.09	–
Alfonso Luigi Marra	14,307	1.19	–	–	–	Long Live Italy	450	0.04	–
Alfonso Luigi Marra	14,307	1.19	–	–	–	Justicialist Front	134	0.01	–
Alfonso Luigi Marra	14,307	1.19	–	–	–	Italic League	129	0.01	–
Alfonso Luigi Marra	14,307	1.19	–	–	–	Total	12,885	1.26	–
Simone Di Stefano	7,166	0.60	–	–	–	CasaPound	6,295	0.62	–
Gianguido Saletnich	2,044	0.17	–	–	–	New Force	1,780	0.17	–
Alessandro Bianchi	2,006	0.17	–	–	–	Rome Project	1,831	0.18	–
Giovanni Palladino	1,800	0.15	–	–	–	Free and Strong Populars	1,593	0.16	–
Luca Romagnoli	1,795	0.15	–	–	–	Tricolour Flame	1,556	0.15	–
Fabrizio Verduchi	1,074	0.09	–	–	–	Christian Italy	855	0.08	–
Gerardo Valentini	996	0.08	–	–	–	Italian Building Site Movement	975	0.10	–
Edoardo De Blasio	974	0.08	–	–	–	Italian Liberal Party	837	0.08	–
Matteo Corsini	843	0.07	–	–	–	Rome Revives	624	0.06	–
Angelo Novellino	809	0.07	–	–	–	Royal Italy	618	0.06	–
Armando Mantuano	775	0.06	–	–	–	Militia Christi	632	0.06	–
Stefano Tersigni	624	0.05	–	–	–	Rome capital city is yours	571	0.06	–
Valerio De Masi	406	0.03	–	–	–	New Italy Party	347	0.03	–
Total	1,203,335	100.00	1,039,373	100.00	3		1,018,911	100.00	45
Eligible voters	2,359,119	100.00	2,359,119	100.00					
Did not vote	1,113,192	47.19	1,296,227	54.95					
Voted	1,245,927	52.81	1,062,892	45.05					
Blank or invalid ballots	42,592	3.54	23,519	2.26					
Total valid votes	1,203,335	96.46	1,039,373	97.74					
Source: Ministry of the Interior

== Municipi election ==
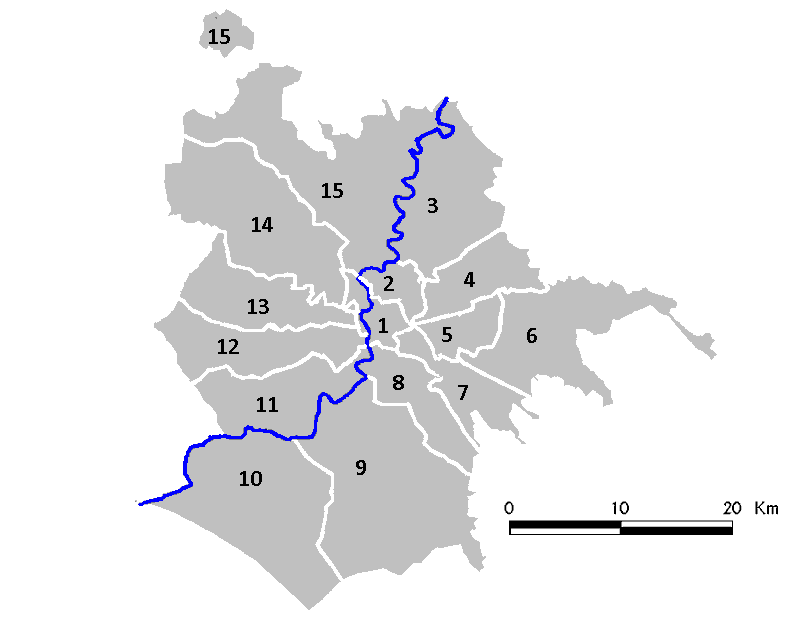

Reduced from 19 to 15 in March 2013, municipi are governed by a president and a council who are elected by its residents every five years. The municipi frequently cross the boundaries of the traditional, non-administrative divisions of the city.

In this election all 15 municipi were won by the centre-left coalition.

Table below shows the results for each municipio with the percentage for each coalition on the first round:

Municipio	Centre-left	Centre-right	Elected President	Party
XII	50.2	27.1	Cristina Maltese	PD

Table below shows the results for each municipio with the percentage for each coalition on the second round:

Municipio	Centre-left	Centre-right	Elected President	Party
I	65.8	34.2	Sabrina Alfonsi	PD
II	62.4	37.6	Giuseppe Gerace	PD
III	64.4	35.6	Paolo Emilio Marchionne	PD
IV	66.6	33.4	Emiliano Sciascia	PD
V	66.7	33.3	Gianmarco Palmieri	PD
VI	60.7	39.3	Marco Scipioni	PD
VII	67.7	32.3	Susana Ana Maria Fantino	SEL
VIII	69.7	30.3	Andrea Catarci	SEL
IX	61.2	38.8	Andrea Santoro	PD
X	64.6	35.4	Andrea Tassone	PD
XI	65.7	34.3	Maurizio Veloccia	PD
XIII	55.3	44.7	Valentino Mancinelli	PD
XIV	61.4	38.6	Valerio Barletta	PD
XV	50.8	49.2	Daniele Torquati	PD

Source: Municipality of Rome - Electoral Service
