= Roberto Morassut =

Italian politician (born 1963)

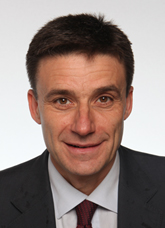

Member of the Chamber of Deputies
- Incumbent
- Assumed office 29 April 2008
- Constituency: Lazio 1 (2008-2022); Rome-Ciampino (since 2022)

Personal details
- Born: 16 November 1963 (age 62) Rome, Italy
- Party: Democratic Party (since 2007)
- Other political affiliations: PCI (till 1991); PDS (1991-1998); DS (1998-2007)
- Education: Sapienza University of Rome
- Occupation: Politician

Roberto Morassut (born 16 November 1963) is an Italian politician.

== Biography ==
Morassut graduated in Literature in 1987 with a contemporary history thesis on the administration of Rome from 1947 to 1952. Since the years of high school he became a member of the Italian Communist Party and then of the Democratic Party of the Left.

After being elected in 1997 a municipal councilor of Rome, in 2001 he is named Councilor for Urban Planning by mayor Walter Veltroni, coordinating, under the guidance of Veltroni himself, the implementation of numerous interventions and public works.

He is first elected deputy for the Democratic Party in 2008, and then re-elected in 2013, 2018 and 2022, dealing with the reform of urban planning legislation and the social security system.

In 2016, he announced his candidacy to the primaries of the Democratic Party for the candidate for Mayor of Rome, being supported mainly by the left-wing minority of the party, but is defeated at the primaries by the candidate of Matteo Renzi, Roberto Giachetti.
