= Alfio Marchini =

Italian entrepreneur and politician

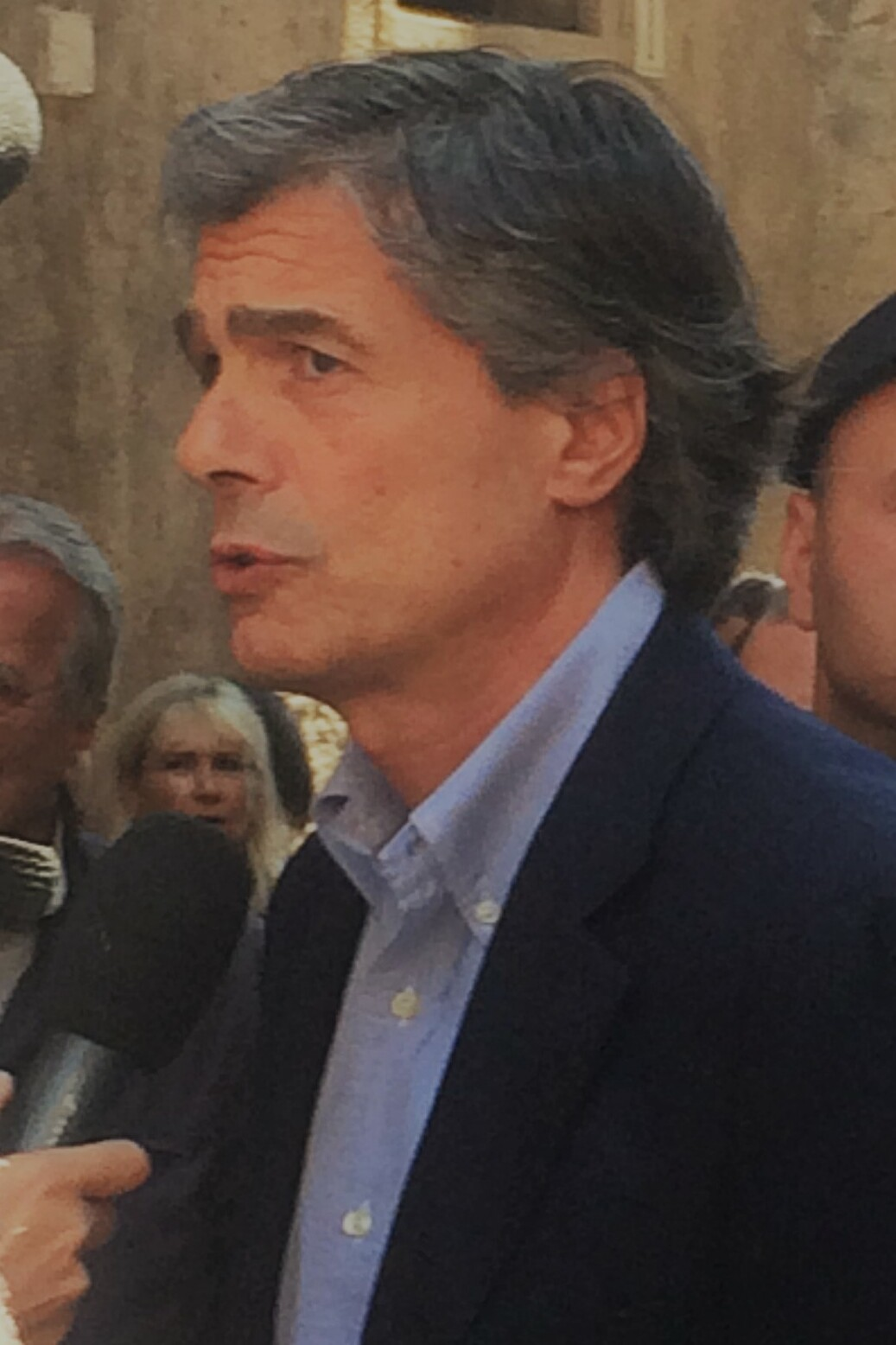
Alfio Marchini in 2016

Alfio Marchini (born 1 April 1965) is an Italian entrepreneur and politician.

== Biography ==
Alfio Marchini is son of Alessandro Marchini, who became rich in the building industry after the Second World War.

== Sports career ==
Alfio Marchini practiced various sports at a competitive level, including swimming, skiing and played in Roma 5-a-side football, winning two Italian Cups. However, his real passion is polo; he played in the Loro Piana Blue team with which he won the major world tournaments including the Queen's cup and the English and Spanish Open. Finally he becomes the captain of the Italian national team which for the first time wins the European championship.

== Political career ==
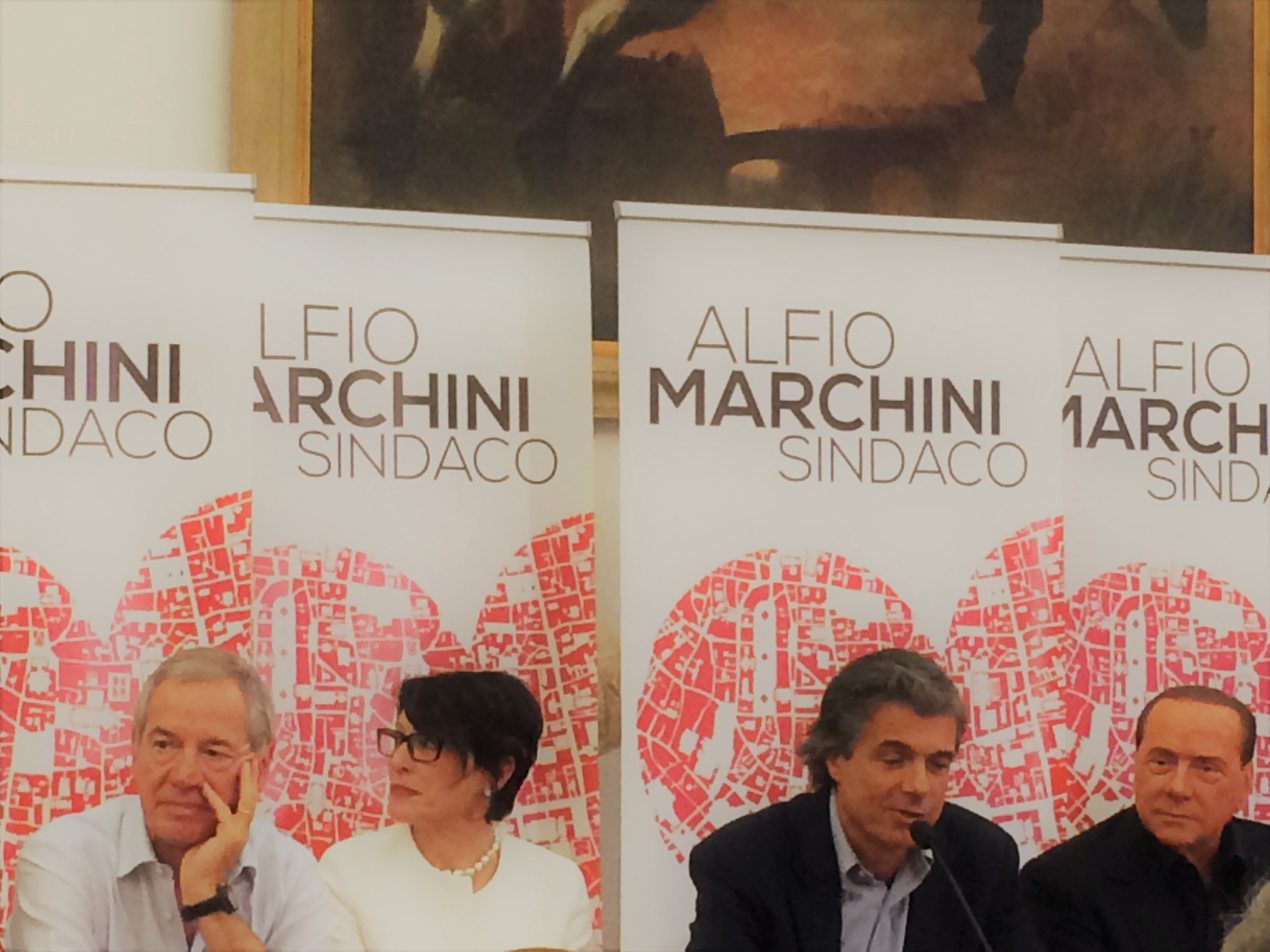
Guido Bertolaso, Alfio Marchini, and Silvio Berlusconi in 2016

In December 2012 he officially announced in an interview with Lucia Annunziata his candidacy for mayor of Rome for the 2013 municipal elections. He is backed by former prime minister Silvio Berlusconi. He then participated in the election of 27 May 2013 with two civic lists, the "Marchini List", and "Let's change with Rome", obtaining 114,169 preferences (9.5% of the vote), finishing fourth after Ignazio Marino (elected mayor for the centre-left coalition), Gianni Alemanno (centre-right) and Marcello De Vito (Five Star Movement). He was elected to the city council with two other representatives of the Marchini List, that scored 7.5% of the vote. He renewed his candidacy in 2016, obtaining the support of Forza Italia, Popular Area and the list promoted by Francesco Storace; Marchini scored 141,250 preferences (10.97%), behind Virginia Raggi, Roberto Giachetti and Giorgia Meloni, while his list scored again 7.5% of the vote. Following this new defeat, he abandoned the politics.
