= Roberto Giachetti =

Italian politician (born 1961)

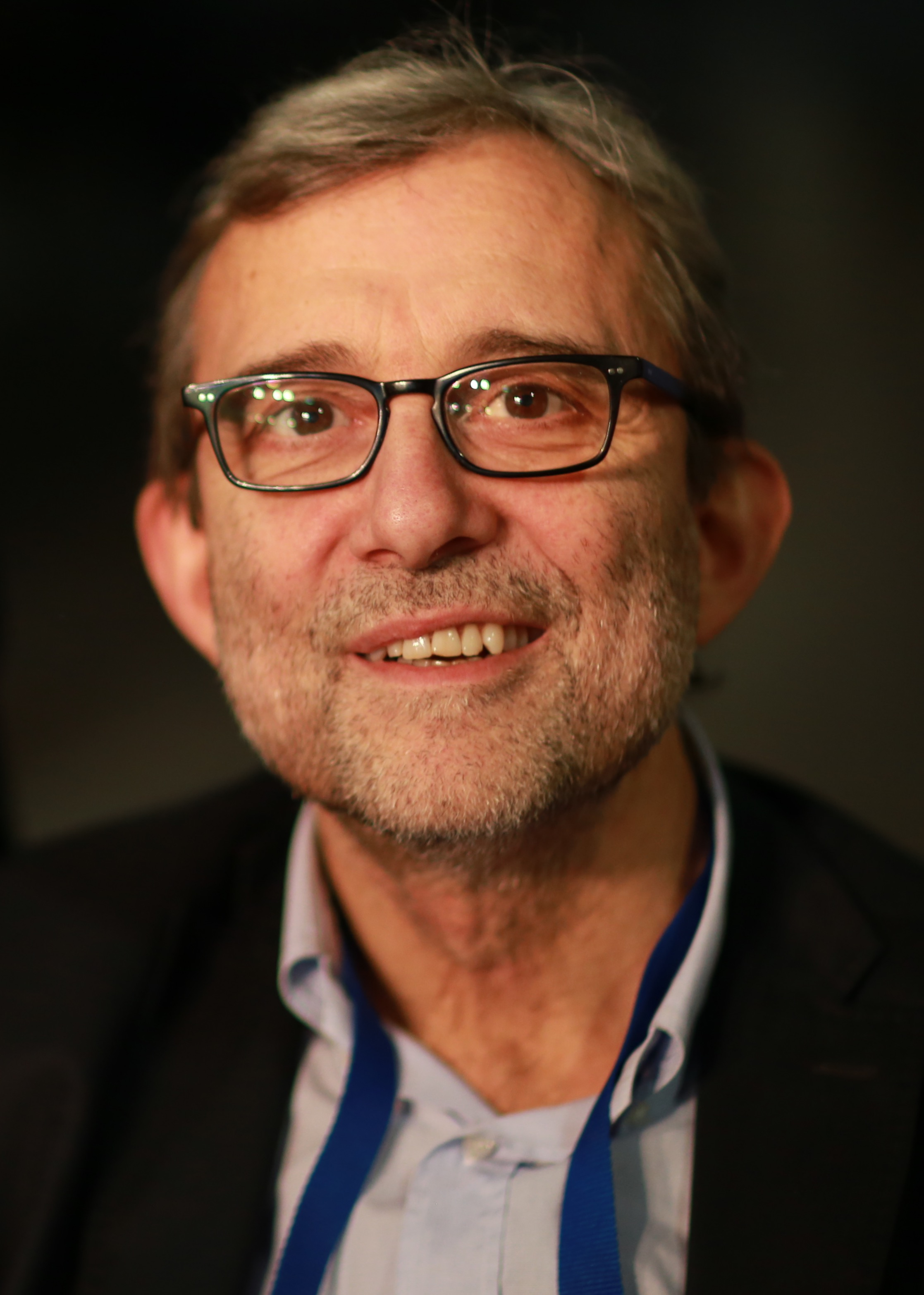

Vice-President of the Chamber of Deputies
- In office 21 March 2013 – 23 March 2018
- President: Laura Boldrini

Member of the Chamber of Deputies
- Incumbent
- Assumed office 30 May 2001

Personal details
- Born: 24 April 1961 (age 64) Rome, Italy
- Party: PR (1979–1989); FdV (1989–1999); Dem (1999–2002); DL (2002–2007); PD (2007–2019); Italia Viva (since 2019)
- Other political affiliations: Transnational Radical Party (since 1989)
- Profession: Politician, journalist

Roberto Giachetti (born 24 April 1961) is an Italian politician, member of Italia Viva and of the Transnational Radical Party. He has been a member of the Italian Chamber of Deputies since 2001.

== Biography ==
Roberto Giachetti was born in Rome in 1961. As a student, he was an activist of center-left libertarian Radical Party (PR), and worked with Radio Radicale. When the Radical Party was dissolved, Giachetti joined the Italian Greens and was elected a district councillor in Rome. In 1993, Mayor of Rome Francesco Rutelli appointed him director of his mayoral cabinet (Italian: capo di gabinetto).

Along with Rutelli, he left the Federation of the Greens (FdV) in 1999 to join the newly launched Democrats party; in 2002, he was one of the founders of The Daisy (La Margherita; DL), born from the merger of the Democrats and the PPI. During the same year, he became municipal secretary of The Daisy in Rome and was first elected to the Chamber of Deputies. In The Daisy, Giachetti was a member of the Rutelliani faction, pushing to model the party after the U.S. Democratic Party. He was confirmed for re-election in the 2006 Italian general election, backed from the centre-left coalition The Olive Tree, and in the 2008 general election, in the ranks of the just formed Democratic Party (PD).

Beginning after the 2013 general election, he became gradually affiliated with the Renziani, the economically market-liberal, socially progressive faction around party secretary Matteo Renzi. On 21 March 2013, Giachetti was elected vice-president of the Chamber of Deputies. In May 2013, he sponsored a motion to abolish the Porcellum electoral law and return to the previous Mattarellum law on an interim basis. Opposed by then–Prime Minister Enrico Letta and a majority of the PD, and supported by some 100 deputies of Left Ecology Freedom (SEL) and the Five Star Movement (M5S), the motion failed, but it prepared the field for the 2015 electoral law reform under Letta's successor Matteo Renzi.

In January 2016 Matteo Renzi asked Giachetti to present his candidacy to Mayor of Rome. He accepted and won the party primaries in March with a 64.1% result, beating Roberto Morassut, Stefano Pedica and others. Backed by the PD, Greens, IdV, Radicals and other minor parties, Giachetti secured 24.87% of the vote in the first round of the 2016 mayoral election; in the runoff vote, he gathered almost 33%, and lost to M5S candidate Virginia Raggi. In the 2017 party leadership election, incumbent secretary Renzi was re-elected; in March, Giachetti joined the second Renzi secretariat.

After being re-elected to the Chamber of Deputies in the 2018 general election, in December of the same year Giachetti announced his candidacy in the 2019 party leadership election on a ticket with fellow Deputy Anna Ascani. Their electoral platform focused on vindicating the accomplishments of the Renzi and Gentiloni Cabinet, and revive the moderate wing of the party, thus thwarting any attempts at an alliance with M5S or Free and Equal (LEU). On 3 March 2019 Giachetti placed third in the contest with a 12% result, after incumbent secretary Maurizio Martina (22%) and President of Lazio Nicola Zingaretti (66%).

In September 2019, Giachetti left the Democratic Party and joined Italia Viva, the liberal party founded by Matteo Renzi.

== Personal life ==
Giachetti was married to Radio Radicale journalist Giovanna Reanda. Now divorced, they have two children, Giulia and Stefano.
