= 1997 Rome municipal election =

← 1993	16 November 1997	2001 →
- Turnout: 74.1% ▼4.6 pp
- Mayoral election
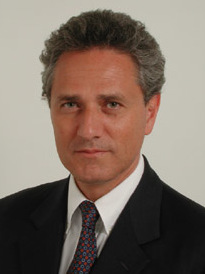

Candidate	Francesco Rutelli	Pierluigi Borghini
Party	Greens	AN
Alliance	Centre-left	Centre-right
Popular vote	985,361	586,083
Percentage	60.4%	35.9%
Mayor before election
Francesco Rutelli
FdV
Elected mayor
Francesco Rutelli
FdV
- City Council election
- All 60 seats in City Council; 31 seats needed for a majority
Party	Leader	Vote %	Seats	+/–
Centre-left	Francesco Rutelli	57.37	36	0
Centre-right	Pierluigi Borghini	38.62	23	
Tricolour Flame	Pino Rauti	1.82	1	
This lists parties that won seats. See the complete results below.

Municipal elections were held in Rome on 16 November 1997 to elect the Mayor of Rome and 60 members of the City Council, as well as the nineteen presidents and more than 400 councillors of the 19 circoscrizioni in which the municipality was divided.

As a result, incumbent mayor Francesco Rutelli was re-elected for a second four-year term by a landslide.

== Background ==
In the 1996 general elections the centre-left coalition led by Romano Prodi performed strongly in nearly all the urban centers across Italy and especially in the city of Rome. Since that moment the political support to leftist parties in Rome started to increase heavily, although the former-fascist National Alliance (AN) continued to maintain a huge number of supporters across the city.

During the previous years, the incumbent mayor Francesco Rutelli saw his personal popularity increase among Roman citizens. During his term in office he promoted some important architectural and urban projects to redevelop the city such as the approval of Parco della Musica concert hall designed by Renzo Piano in 1994 and the urban plan called "Cento piazze" (literally "One hundred squares") in 1995, a project to renovate different squares and creating new pedestrian zones in many parts of the city, from the historical city center to the suburbs. Thanks to this plan many historical and tourist landmarks of Rome were renovated and pedestrianized such as Piazza di Spagna (1995) and Piazza del Popolo (1997).

As a part of his plan to renovate the city, in March 1995 Rutelli submitted an unsuccessful bid to host the 2004 Summer Olympics, which were ultimately awarded to Athens in September 1997.

Against the mayor, the centre-right Pole for Freedoms coalition initially seemed intentioned to propose the candidacy of the right-wing deputy Francesco Storace, but ultimately chose Pierluigi Borghini, a famous conservative businessman, in an attempt to gain more votes from independent and centrist voters.

== Voting system ==
The voting system is used for all mayoral elections in Italy, in the city with a population higher than 15,000 inhabitants. Under this system voters express a direct choice for the mayor or an indirect choice voting for the party of the candidate's coalition. If no candidate receives 50% of votes, the top two candidates go to a second round after two weeks. This gives a result whereby the winning candidate may be able to claim majority support, although it is not guaranteed.

The election of the City Council is based on a direct choice for the candidate with a preference vote: the candidate with the majority of the preferences is elected. The number of the seats for each party is determined proportionally.

== Parties and candidates ==
This is a list of the major parties (and their respective leaders) which participated in the election.

Political party or alliance	Constituent lists	Candidate
Centre-left coalition (The Olive Tree)	Democratic Party of the Left	Francesco Rutelli
Centre-left coalition (The Olive Tree)	Italian People's Party	Francesco Rutelli
Centre-left coalition (The Olive Tree)	Federation of the Greens	Francesco Rutelli
Centre-left coalition (The Olive Tree)	Communist Refoundation Party	Francesco Rutelli
Centre-left coalition (The Olive Tree)	Pannella List	Francesco Rutelli
Centre-left coalition (The Olive Tree)	Italian Renewal	Francesco Rutelli
Centre-left coalition (The Olive Tree)	Rutelli List	Francesco Rutelli
Centre-left coalition (The Olive Tree)	Others	Francesco Rutelli
Centre-right coalition (Pole for Freedoms)	Forza Italia	Pierluigi Borghini
Centre-right coalition (Pole for Freedoms)	National Alliance	Pierluigi Borghini
Centre-right coalition (Pole for Freedoms)	Christian Democratic Centre	Pierluigi Borghini
Centre-right coalition (Pole for Freedoms)	Others	Pierluigi Borghini
Tricolour Flame		Pino Rauti

== Results ==
Summary of the 1997 Rome City Council and Mayoral election results
Candidates	Votes	%	Leader's seat	Parties	Votes	%	Seats
Francesco Rutelli	983,902	60.42	–	Democratic Party of the Left	281,832	21.98	15
Francesco Rutelli	983,902	60.42	–	Communist Refoundation Party	112,628	8.78	6
Francesco Rutelli	983,902	60.42	–	Rutelli List	89,790	7.00	5
Francesco Rutelli	983,902	60.42	–	Federation of the Greens	83,321	6.50	4
Francesco Rutelli	983,902	60.42	–	Italian People's Party	71,123	5.55	3
Francesco Rutelli	983,902	60.42	–	Italian Renewal	29,387	2.29	1
Francesco Rutelli	983,902	60.42	–	Pannella List	20,878	1.63	1
Francesco Rutelli	983,902	60.42	–	Democratic Socialists	20,859	1.63	1
Francesco Rutelli	983,902	60.42	–	Democratic Union	17,922	1.40	–
Francesco Rutelli	983,902	60.42	–	Italian Republican Party	7,946	0.62	–
Francesco Rutelli	983,902	60.42	–	Total	735,686	57.37	36
Pierluigi Borghini	585,367	35.94	check	National Alliance	308,745	24.08	14
Pierluigi Borghini	585,367	35.94	check	Forza Italia – United Christian Democrats	129,391	10.09	6
Pierluigi Borghini	585,367	35.94	check	Christian Democratic Centre – Pact for Rome	47,681	3.72	2
Pierluigi Borghini	585,367	35.94	check	Federalist Greens	5,846	0.46	–
Pierluigi Borghini	585,367	35.94	check	United Italy	3,528	0.28	–
Pierluigi Borghini	585,367	35.94	check	Total	495,191	38.62	22
Pino Rauti	26,389	1.62	check	Tricolour Flame	23,380	1.82	–
Tiziana Parenti	12,586	0.77	–	Liberal Socialists	10,218	0.80	
Raffaele D'Ambrosio	7,988	0.49	–	Humanitas	9,101	0.71	–
Sforza Ruspoli	5,965	0.37	–	Civic list	4,246	0.33	–
Marina Larena	4,091	0.25	–	Humanist Party	2,687	0.21	–
Giancarlo Cito	2,233	0.14	–	Southern Action League	1,751	0.14	–
Total	1,628,521	100.00	2		1,282,260	100.00	58
Eligible voters	2,301,277	100.00					
Did not vote	596,246	25.91					
Voted	1,705,031	74.09					
Blank or invalid ballots	76,510	4.48					
Total valid votes	1,628,521	95.52					
Source: Ministry of the Interior

== Circoscrizioni election ==
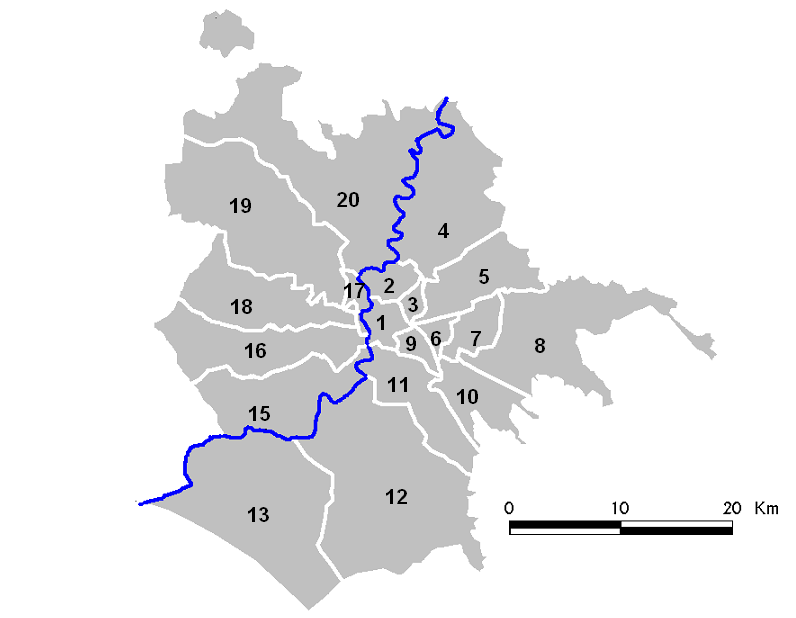

Since 1972 the city of Rome had been divided into 20 administrative areas, called circoscrizioni (reduced to 19 in 1992 after Fiumicino became an independent comune separated from Rome). In 1997 for the first time the presidents of each circoscrizione was directly elected by citizens. No second round was needed since the candidate who received the most votes was elected president.

Table below shows the results for each circoscrizione with the percentage for each coalition:

Circoscrizione	Centre-left	Centre-right	Elected President	Party
I	55.0	39.7	Attilio Bellucci	RI
II	48.2	46.1	Giuseppe Ignesti	PDS
III	53.4	41.0	Vittorio Sartogo	PRC
IV	53.8	32.3	Massimo Nardi	PPI
V	61.5	32.5	Loredana Mezzabotta	PDS
VI	59.0	32.6	Enzo Puro	PDS
VII	55.3	38.5	Pino Battaglia	PDS
VIII	54.2	36.7	Giuseppe Celli	PDS
IX	55.3	39.0	Fulvio Torreti	FdV
X	57.9	35.1	Giusto Trevisiol	PRC
XI	56.1	38.8	Rosario Mocciaro	PDS
XII	52.9	41.6	Antonio Gazzellone	PPI
XIII	53.1	36.3	Massimo Di Somma	PDS
XV	58.0	37.4	Giovanni Paris	PPI
XVI	58.0	37.5	Dario Marcucci	PPI
XVII	50.7	43.5	Marco Noccioli	PRC
XVIII	48.5	44.5	Nicola Palombi	RI
XIX	53.0	40.4	Emilia Allocca	PDS
XX	45.9	47.3	Marco Clarke	AN

Source: Municipality of Rome - Electoral Service
