= Giovanni Gugliotti =

Italian politician (born 1976)

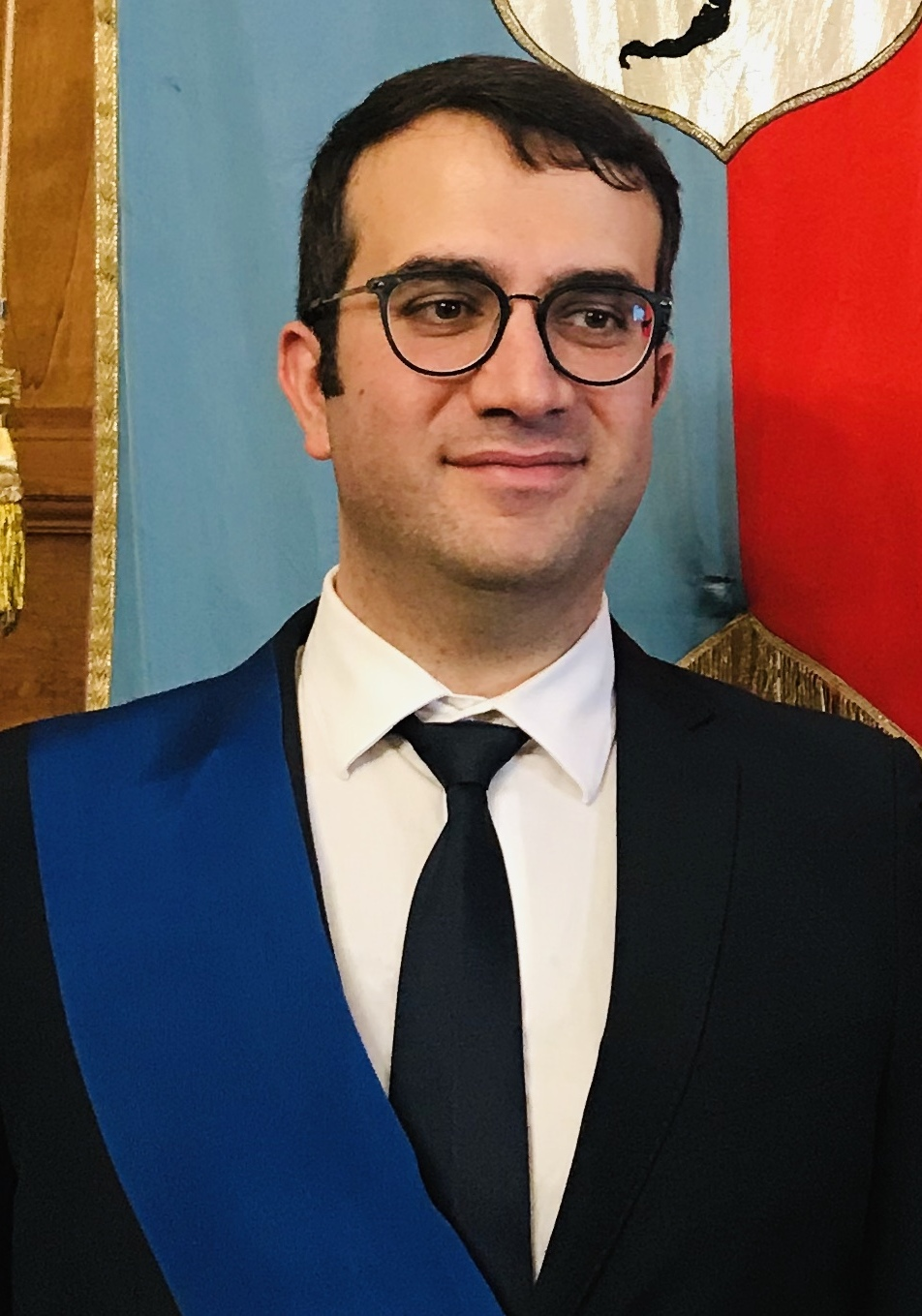

President of the Province of Taranto
- In office 2 November 2018 – 18 September 2022
- Preceded by: Martino Tamburrano
- Succeeded by: Rinaldo Melucci

Mayor of Castellaneta
- In office 23 May 2012 – 29 June 2022
- Preceded by: Italo D'Alessandro
- Succeeded by: Giambattista Di Pippa

Personal details
- Born: 19 May 1976 (age 50) Gioia del Colle, Apulia, Italy
- Party: Forza Italia; The People of Freedom; Forza Italia; Lega

Giovanni Gugliotti (born 19 May 1976) is an Italian politician who served as president of the Province of Taranto from 2018 to 2022 and as mayor of Castellaneta from 2012 to 2022.

== Life and career ==
Gugliotti was elected to the municipal council of Castellaneta in 2007 as a member of Forza Italia. He served as president of the municipal council until 2012. From 2009 to 2013, he was also a member of the Provincial Council of Taranto.

In the 2012 local elections, Gugliotti was elected mayor of Castellaneta, taking office on 23 May 2012. He remained mayor until June 2022.

In October 2018, Gugliotti was elected president of the Province of Taranto, supported by a transversal alliance known as the Patto dei sindaci (Pact of the Mayors), bringing together centre-right, centre-left and civic representatives. He defeated Rinaldo Melucci, the centre-left mayor of Taranto, receiving 54,845 weighted votes (61.8%) against Melucci's 33,888 (38.2%).

In June 2025, he was appointed extraordinary commissioner of the Port Authority of the Ionian Sea, which manages the port of Taranto, by minister of Infrastructure and Transport Matteo Salvini. On 12 November 2025, Gugliotti was formally appointed president of the Port Authority for a four-year term. His appointment was criticized because of his lack of previous professional experience in the port sector.

In 2025, Gugliotti became the subject of a criminal investigation for alleged calunnia in connection with eleven anonymous complaints submitted to the Taranto prosecutor's office concerning political opponents. In January 2026, he subsequently reached a plea agreement accepted by the judge for preliminary investigations of Taranto, resulting in a conviction for calunnia and false testimony in connection with the case.
