= 2001 Rome municipal election =

← 1997	13 May 2001 (first round); 27 May 2001 (second round)	2006 →
- Turnout: 79.4% ▲5.3 pp (first round); 74.2% ▼5.2 pp (second round)
- Mayoral election
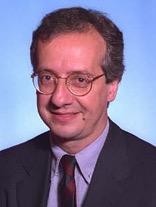

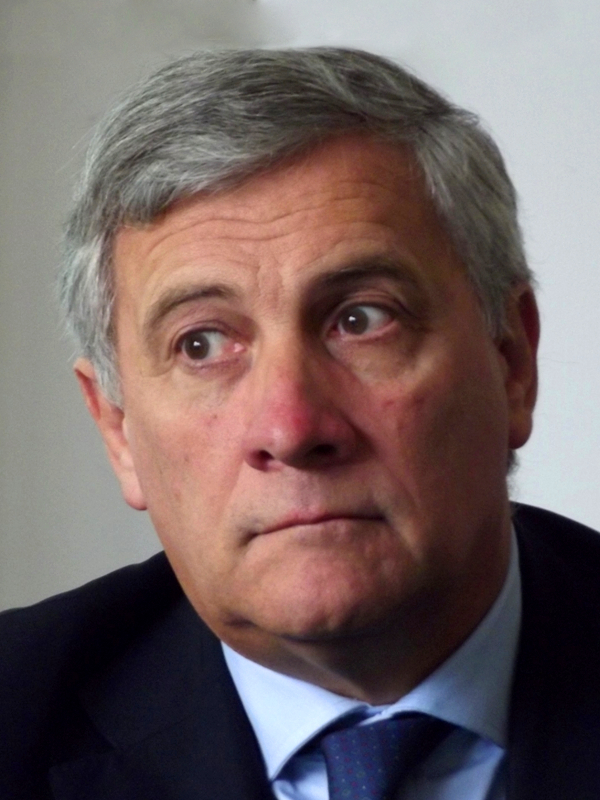
Candidate	Walter Veltroni	Antonio Tajani
Party	DS	FI
Alliance	Centre-left	Centre-right
1st Round vote	800,275	746,846
Percentage	48.3%	45.1%
2nd Round vote	871,930	799,363
Percentage	52.2%	47.8%
Mayor before election
Enzo Mosino
(Special commissioner)
Elected mayor
Walter Veltroni
DS
- City Council election
- All 60 seats in City Council; 31 seats needed for a majority
Party	Leader	Vote %	Seats	+/–
Centre-left	Walter Veltroni	45.49	36	0
Centre-right	Antonio Tajani	47.49	24	+1
This lists parties that won seats. See the complete results below.

Municipal elections were held in Rome on 13 and 27 May 2001 to elect the Mayor of Rome and 60 members of the City Council, as well as the nineteen presidents and more than 400 councillors of the 19 municipi in which the municipality was divided. The first round of the elections occurred on the same date of the national general election.

The outgoing Mayor Francesco Rutelli, term-limited by the Italian law on local government, had resigned from his position on 8 January that year to run as the main candidate of The Olive Tree in the national general election.

The two main candidates were the former Minister of Cultural Heritage, former Deputy Prime Minister and incumbent secretary of the Democrats of the Left (DS) Walter Veltroni and the liberal-conservative MEP Antonio Tajani, a prominent member of Silvio Berlusconi's Forza Italia (FI).

Since none of the candidates obtained the majority of votes on the first round, a second round vote was held on 27 May 2001. As a result of the election, Veltroni was elected mayor with 52% of votes and sworn in on 1 June 2001.

== Background ==
Following the end of the parliamentary legislature, Rutelli was chosen to lead the centre-left coalition in the 2001 general election and resigned as Mayor of Rome on 8 January 2001, just two days after the end of the Great Jubilee.

=== Mayoral election ===
The House of Freedoms had been heavily defeated in the previous municipal election. Tajani rejected a formal alliance with the far-right parties and preferred a liberal-conservative coalition, like the one which supported Silvio Berlusconi in the general election.

Thanks to the overlap with the general election, which saw a huge victor of the House of Freedoms alliance, the centre-right coalition unexpectedly succeeded to win a majority of votes across the city. Although a strong performance of his coalition, Tajani wasn't able to win the race and on the second round he had to concede to Veltroni, who showed to have a strong support in the city. Despite the lower number of votes, the centre-left coalition obtained the majority of seats in the City Council thanks to the electoral system's mechanisms.

== Voting System ==
The voting system is used for all mayoral elections in Italy, in the city with a population higher than 15,000 inhabitants. Under this system voters express a direct choice for the mayor or an indirect choice voting for the party of the candidate's coalition. If no candidate receives 50% of votes, the top two candidates go to a second round after two weeks. This gives a result whereby the winning candidate may be able to claim majority support, although it is not guaranteed.

The election of the city council is based on a direct choice for the candidate with a preference vote: the candidate with the majority of the preferences is elected. The number of the seats for each party is determined proportionally.

== Parties and candidates ==
This is a list of the major parties (and their respective leaders) which participated in the election.

Political party or alliance	Constituent lists	Candidate
Centre-left coalition (The Olive Tree)	Democrats of the Left	Walter Veltroni
Centre-left coalition (The Olive Tree)	The Daisy	Walter Veltroni
Centre-left coalition (The Olive Tree)	Federation of the Greens	Walter Veltroni
Centre-left coalition (The Olive Tree)	Party of Italian Communists	Walter Veltroni
Centre-left coalition (The Olive Tree)	Communist Refoundation Party	Walter Veltroni
Centre-left coalition (The Olive Tree)	Italian Democratic Socialists	Walter Veltroni
Centre-left coalition (The Olive Tree)	Veltroni List	Walter Veltroni
Centre-right coalition (House of Freedoms)	Forza Italia	Antonio Tajani
Centre-right coalition (House of Freedoms)	National Alliance	Antonio Tajani
Centre-right coalition (House of Freedoms)	Christian Democratic Centre	Antonio Tajani
Centre-right coalition (House of Freedoms)	United Christian Democrats	Antonio Tajani
Centre-right coalition (House of Freedoms)	Others	Antonio Tajani

== Results ==
Summary of the 2001 Rome City Council and Mayoral election results
Candidates	1st round		2nd round		Leader's seat	Parties	Votes	%	Seats
Candidates	Votes	%	Votes	%	Leader's seat	Parties	Votes	%	Seats
Walter Veltroni	800,275	48.35	871,930	52.17	–	Democrats of the Left	238,092	17.64	15
Walter Veltroni	800,275	48.35	871,930	52.17	–	Veltroni List	146,463	10.85	9
Walter Veltroni	800,275	48.35	871,930	52.17	–	The Daisy	111,315	8.25	7
Walter Veltroni	800,275	48.35	871,930	52.17	–	Communist Refoundation Party	61,728	4.57	3
Walter Veltroni	800,275	48.35	871,930	52.17	–	Federation of the Greens	31,698	2.35	2
Walter Veltroni	800,275	48.35	871,930	52.17	–	Party of Italian Communists	15,462	1.15	–
Walter Veltroni	800,275	48.35	871,930	52.17	–	Italian Democratic Socialists	9,244	0.68	–
Walter Veltroni	800,275	48.35	871,930	52.17	–	Total	614,002	45.49	36 (Note: Even if the coalition didn't receive the majority of votes, no other alliance was able to obtain overall more than 50% of votes. Once its mayoral candidate won the second round, the coalition was awarded the majority bonus granted by the electoral law to the alliance whose candidate is elected mayor.)
Antonio Tajani	746,846	45.12	799,363	47.83	check	National Alliance	283,922	21.04	11
Antonio Tajani	746,846	45.12	799,363	47.83	check	Forza Italia	259,514	19.23	10
Antonio Tajani	746,846	45.12	799,363	47.83	check	Christian Democratic Centre – United Christian Democrats	41,148	3.05	1
Antonio Tajani	746,846	45.12	799,363	47.83	check	Tajani List	37,393	2.77	1
Antonio Tajani	746,846	45.12	799,363	47.83	check	New Italian Socialist Party	8,268	0.61	–
Antonio Tajani	746,846	45.12	799,363	47.83	check	Italian Republican Party	3,136	0.23	–
Antonio Tajani	746,846	45.12	799,363	47.83	check	Liberal Party – Greens Greens	2,958	0.22	–
Antonio Tajani	746,846	45.12	799,363	47.83	check	Pensioners and Disabled	1,985	0.15	–
Antonio Tajani	746,846	45.12	799,363	47.83	check	Modern Democracy	1,584	0.12	–
Antonio Tajani	746,846	45.12	799,363	47.83	check	Active Democracy	1,025	0.08	–
Antonio Tajani	746,846	45.12	799,363	47.83	check	Total	640,933	47.49	23
Sergio D'Antoni	40,025	2.42	–	–	–	European Democracy	28,905	2.14	–
Sergio D'Antoni	40,025	2.42	–	–	–	United Pensioners	4,686	0.35	–
Sergio D'Antoni	40,025	2.42	–	–	–	Total	33,591	2.49	–
Giovanni Roma	19,064	1.15	–	–	–	Italy of Values	17,917	1.33	–
Angiolo Bandinelli	16,483	1.00	–	–	–	Bonino List	14,236	1.05	–
Isabella Rauti	9,551	0.58	–	–	–	Tricolour Flame	8,709	0.65	–
Adriano Tilgher	5,937	0.36	–	–	–	National Social Front	5,361	0.40	–
Guido Mussolini	3,497	0.21	–	–	–	New Force	2,732	0.20	–
Alessandro Cicero	3,294	0.20	–	–	–	Pole of the Centre	1,649	0.12	–
Dario Di Francesco	2,996	0.18	–	–	–	Avanti Lazio	2,738	0.20	–
Mario Adinolfi	1,587	0.10	–	–	–	Direct Democracy	1,543	0.11	–
Michele Capuano	1,539	0.09	–	–	–	Popular Democracy (United Left)	1,609	0.12	–
Giuseppe Conti	1,152	0.07	–	–	–	Independent Movement for Animal Rights	1,091	0.08	–
Antonio Licata	1,125	0.07	–	–	–	European Populars	1,984	0.15	–
Loredana Cici	1,010	0.06	–	–	–	Humanist Party	856	0.06	–
Maurizio Saracini	710	0.04	–	–	–	Italy of Citizens	739	0.05	–
Total	1,655,091	100.00	1,671,293	100.00	1		1,349,690	100.00	59
Eligible voters	2,290,787	100.00	2,290,787	100.00					
Did not vote	474,492	20.63	591,066	25.80					
Voted	1,818,295	79.37	1,699,721	74.20					
Blank or invalid ballots	163,204	8.97	28,428	1.67					
Total valid votes	1,655,091	91.03	1,671,293	98.33					
Source: Ministry of the Interior

== Municipi election ==
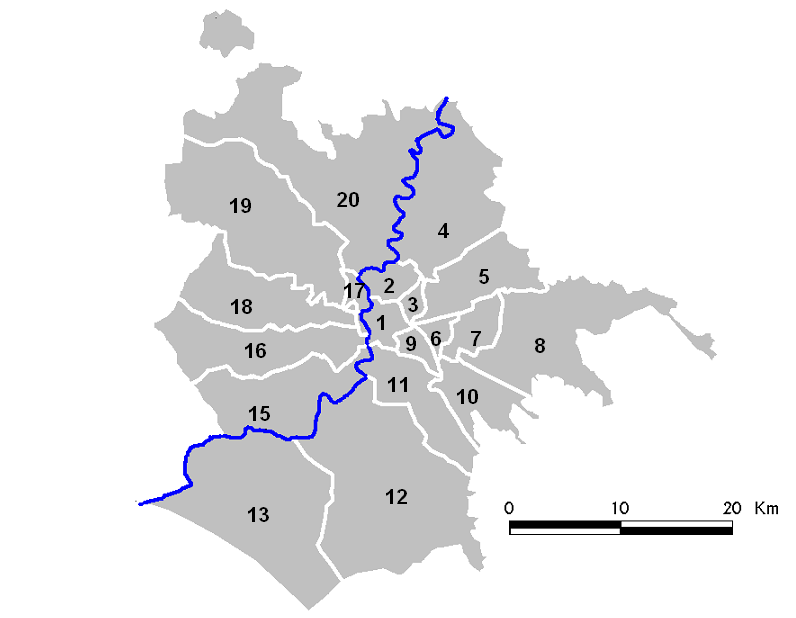

In January 2001 the City Council of Rome approved a new decentralization reform. The previous circoscrizioni were renamed municipi and the direct election in two different rounds of a president to head each municipio was established.

Table below shows the results for each municipio with the percentage for each coalition on the first round:

Municipio	The Olive Tree	House of Freedoms	Elected President	Party
II	42.5	51.1	Antonio Saccone	FI
V	52.4	40.5	Ivano Caradonna	DS
VI	50.9	41.8	Enzo Puro	DS
XVIII	41.3	51.6	Vincenzo Fratta	AN
XX	40.0	54.7	Massimiliano Fasoli	CCD

Table below shows the results for each municipio with the percentage for each coalition on the second round:

Municipio	The Olive Tree	House of Freedoms	Elected President	Party
I	52.6	47.4	Giuseppe Lobefaro	DL
III	53.7	46.3	Orlando Corsetti	DL
IV	51.2	48.8	Benvenuto Salducco	DL
VII	53.9	46.1	Stefano Tozzi	PRC
VIII	51.0	49.0	Giuseppe Celli	SDI
IX	52.9	47.1	Maurizio Oliva	FdV
X	53.7	46.3	Sandro Medici	PRC
XI	53.4	46.6	Massimiliano Smeriglio	PRC
XII	49.3	50.7	Paolo Pollak	FI
XIII	48.4	51.6	Davide Bordoni	FI
XV	51.5	48.5	Giovanni Paris	DL
XVI	54.1	45.9	Fabio Bellini	DS
XVII	49.8	50.2	Roberto Vernarelli	CCD
XIX	49.5	50.5	Marco Visconti	AN

Source: Municipality of Rome - Electoral Service
