= Melucci =

Melucci is an Italian surname, a derivative of the personal name Melo, which itself is a shortened form of names ending in –melo, such as Carmelo.

Notable people with the surname include:

- Giulia Melucci (born 1966), American writer
- Rinaldo Melucci (born 1977), Italian politician
