= List of mayors of Taranto =

Mayor of Taranto
- Sindaco di Taranto

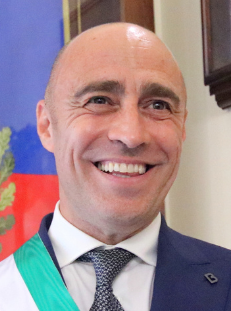
- Incumbent; Piero Bitetti since 17 June 2025
- Seat: Palazzo di Città
- Appointer: Popular election
- Term length: 5 years, renewable once
- Formation: September 1860
- Website: Official website

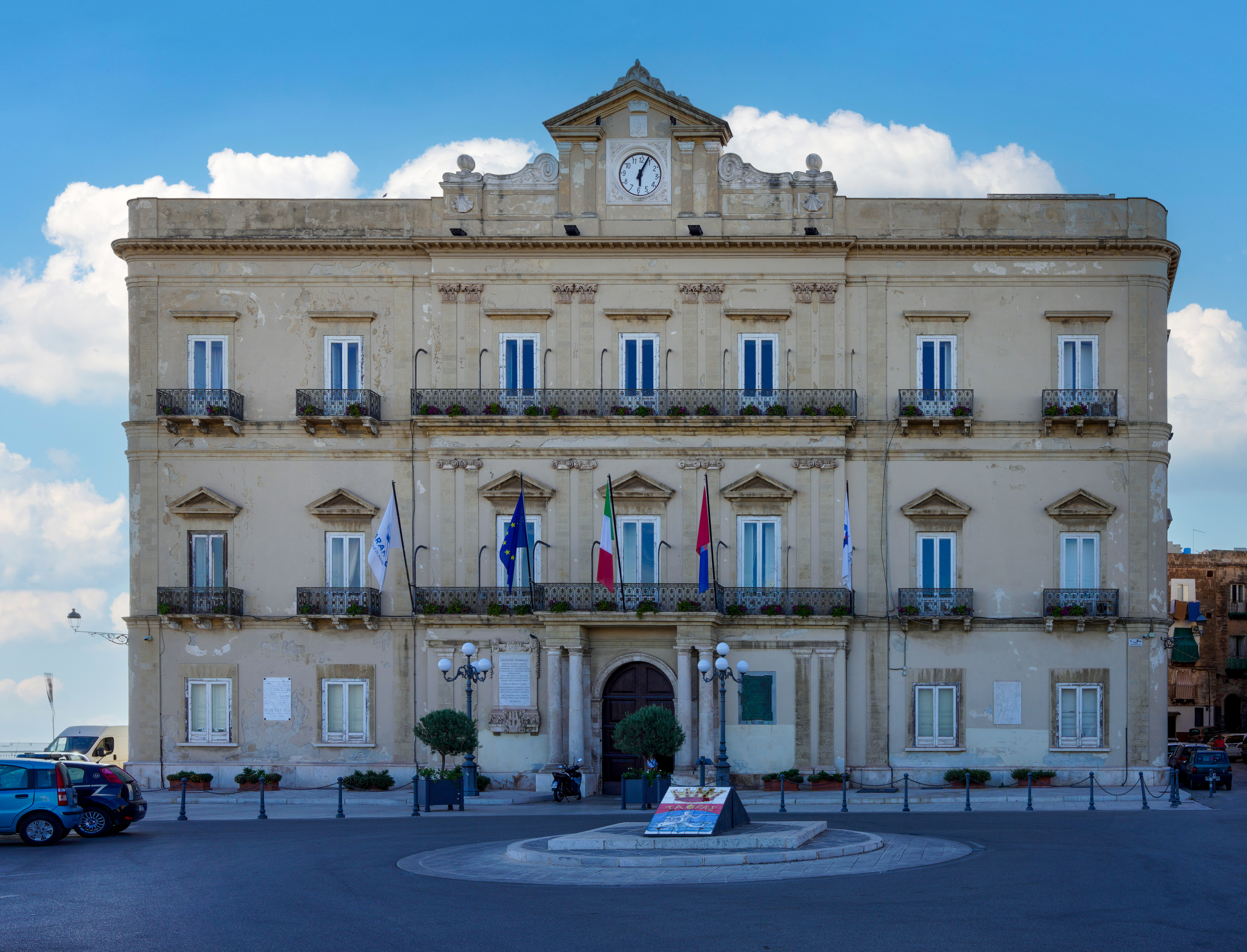
Palazzo di Città is the seat of the Mayor of Taranto.

The mayor of Taranto is an elected politician who, along with the Taranto's city council, is accountable for the strategic government of Taranto in Apulia, Italy, the second biggest city of the region.

Since 17 June 2025, the mayor is Piero Bitetti, supported by the centre-left coalition.

== Overview ==
According to the Italian Constitution, the mayor of Taranto is member of the city council.

The mayor is elected by the population of Taranto, who also elect the members of the city council, controlling the mayor's policy guidelines and is able to enforce his resignation by a motion of no confidence. The mayor is entitled to appoint and release the members of his government.

Since 1993 the mayor is elected directly by Taranto's electorate: in all mayoral elections in Italy in cities with a population higher than 15,000 the voters express a direct choice for the mayor or an indirect choice voting for the party of the candidate's coalition. If no candidate receives at least 50% of votes, the top two candidates go to a second round after two weeks. The election of the City Council is based on a direct choice for the candidate with a preference vote: the candidate with the majority of the preferences is elected. The number of the seats for each party is determined proportionally.

== Republic of Italy (since 1946) ==
=== City Council election (1946-1993) ===
From 1946 to 1993, the Mayor of Taranto was elected by the City Council.

	Mayor	Term start	Term end	Party
1	Odoardo Voccoli	14 December 1946	28 February 1948	PCI
2	Carlo Di Donna	5 February 1949	2 May 1950	PCI
3	Nicola De Falco	13 July 1951	25 July 1956	PCI
4	Raffaele Leone	25 July 1956	15 December 1957	DC
5	Angelo Monfredi	15 December 1957	23 April 1961	DC
6	Salvatore Spallitta	23 April 1961	26 July 1963	DC
7	Giuseppe Conte	26 July 1963	5 May 1965	DC
8	Angelo Vincenzo Curci	5 May 1965	27 September 1970	DC
9	Franco Lorusso	27 September 1970	15 September 1975	DC
10	Leonardo Paradiso	15 September 1975	9 July 1976	DC
11	Giuseppe Cannata	9 July 1976	1 May 1983	PCI
12	Augusto Intelligente	1 May 1983	1 July 1983	PCI
13	Giovanni Vittorio Battafarano	1 July 1983	14 October 1985	PCI
14	Mario Guadagnolo	14 October 1985	1 August 1990	PSI
15	Michele Armentani	1 August 1990	1 January 1991	PSI
16	Alfengo Carducci	1 January 1991	19 November 1991	DC
17	Roberto Della Torre	19 November 1991	5 December 1993	DC

=== Direct election (since 1993) ===
Since 1993, under provisions of new local administration law, the Mayor of Taranto is chosen by direct election, originally every four, than every five years.

	Mayor	Term start	Term end	Party	Coalition	Election
18	Giancarlo Cito	5 December 1993	24 February 1996 (Note: Resigned.)	LAM	LAM	1993
19	Gaetano De Cosmo	24 February 1996 (Note: As deputy Mayor.)	23 June 1996	LAM	LAM	1993
19	Gaetano De Cosmo	23 June 1996	1 May 2000	LAM	LAM • FI • AN	1996
20	Rossana Di Bello	1 May 2000	4 April 2005	FI	FI • AN • CCD	2000
20	Rossana Di Bello	4 April 2005	18 February 2006 (Note: Resigned.)	FI	FI • AN • UDC	2005
Special Prefectural Commissioner tenure (18 February 2006 – 14 June 2007)
21	Ippazio Stefano	14 June 2007	22 May 2012	PRC; SEL	PRC • PdCI • FdV	2007
21	Ippazio Stefano	22 May 2012	29 June 2017	PRC; SEL	PD • SEL • IdV • PSI	2012
22	Rinaldo Melucci	29 June 2017	16 November 2021 (Note: Ousted out of office after losing the majority in the City Council.)	PD	PD • PSI	2017
Special Prefectural Commissioner tenure (16 November 2021 – 17 June 2022)
(22)	Rinaldo Melucci	17 June 2022	21 February 2025 (Note: Ousted out of office after losing the majority in the City Council.)	PD; IV	PD • SI • M5S • EV	2022
Special Prefectural Commissioner tenure (21 February 2025 – 17 June 2025)
23	Piero Bitetti	17 June 2025	Incumbent	Ind	PD • DemoS • AVS	2025
