= Gianfranco Palmisano =

Italian politician (born 1987)

- Palmisano in 2022

President of the Province of Taranto
- Incumbent
- Assumed office 23 May 2025
- Preceded by: Rinaldo Melucci

Mayor of Martina Franca
- Incumbent
- Assumed office 15 June 2022
- Preceded by: Francesco Ancona

Personal details
- Born: 2 September 1987 (age 39) Bari, Apulia, Italy
- Party: Democratic Party

Gianfranco Palmisano (born 2 September 1987) is an Italian politician of the Democratic Party serving as president of the Province of Taranto since 2025. He has served as mayor of Martina Franca since 2022.

In the 2025 provincial election, Palmisano, supported by the centre-left coalition, was elected president of the Province of Taranto with 45.28% of the weighted vote, defeating civic candidate Ciro D'Alò, mayor of Grottaglie, and centre-right Alfredo Longo, mayor of Maruggio.
