= List of presidents of the Province of Taranto =

President of the Province of Taranto
- Presidente della Provincia di Taranto

- Incumbent; Gianfranco Palmisano since 23 May 2025
- Term length: 4 years
- Formation: 1923

The president of the Province of Taranto is the head of the provincial government in Taranto, Apulia, Italy. The president oversees the administration of the province, coordinates the activities of the municipalities, and represents the province in regional and national matters.

Since May 2025, the office has been held by Gianfranco Palmisano of the Democratic Party.

== List ==
=== Presidents of the Royal Commission (1923–1929) ===
No.	Portrait	Name	Term		Party
No.	Portrait	Name	Start	End	Party
		Nicola Maffei	28 November 1923	1 July 1924	Royal commissioner
1		Pietro Zanframundo	1 July 1924	25 May 1926	National Fascist Party
2		Ferdinando Natoli	25 May 1926	10 November 1926	National Fascist Party
3		Mario Rizzo	10 November 1926	25 January 1927	National Fascist Party
4		Osvaldo Adami	25 January 1927	9 May 1927	National Fascist Party
5		Giuseppe Meta	9 May 1927	28 April 1929	National Fascist Party

=== Presidents of the Provincial Rectorate (1929–1943) ===
No.	Portrait	Name	Term		Party
No.	Portrait	Name	Start	End	Party
1		Giuseppe Turi	28 April 1929	5 January 1939	National Fascist Party
–		Luigi Gardini	5 January 1939	12 August 1939	Prefectural commissioner
–		Raffaele Muscogiuri	13 August 1939	4 October 1939	Prefectural commissioner
2		Cesare Blandamura	4 October 1939	8 October 1943	National Fascist Party
–		Raffaele D'Alessandro	8 October 1943	2 December 1943	Prefectural commissioner
–		Alberto Rochira	3 December 1943	5 May 1944	Prefectural commissioner

=== Presidents of the Provincial Deputation (1944–1951) ===
No.	Portrait	Name	Term		Party
No.	Portrait	Name	Start	End	Party
1		Alfredo Fighera	6 May 1944	1951	Christian Democracy

=== Presidents of the Province (1951–present) ===
No.	Portrait	Name	Term		Party
No.	Portrait	Name	Start	End	Party
1		Alfredo Fighera	1951	28 March 1953	Christian Democracy
2		Pietro Diasparro	27 June 1953	28 September 1960	Christian Democracy
3		Giuseppe Conte	29 September 1960	26 July 1963	Christian Democracy
4		Nicola Lazzaro	26 July 1963	29 October 1969	Christian Democracy
5		Franco Muschio Schiavone	6 January 1970	16 December 1971	Christian Democracy
6		Paolo Tarantino	4 January 1972	4 January 1986	Christian Democracy
7		Giovanni Iacovelli	12 May 1986	31 October 1986	Christian Democracy
8		Giovanni De Cataldo	1 November 1986	8 August 1988	Italian Republican Party
9		Cosimo Fretta	9 August 1988	23 July 1990	Independent
10		Mario Luciano D'Alconzo	24 September 1990	14 July 1995	Italian Socialist Party
11		Marcello Cantore	31 May 1995	14 June 1999	Forza Italia
12		Domenico Rana	14 June 1999	14 June 2004	Independent (centre-right)
13		Giovanni Florido	14 June 2004	18 May 2013	Democratic Party
–		Mario Tafaro	18 May 2013	29 September 2014	Prefectural commissioner
14		Martino Tamburrano	29 September 2014	2 November 2018	Forza Italia
15		Giovanni Gugliotti	2 November 2018	18 September 2022	Forza Italia
16		Rinaldo Melucci	18 September 2022	21 February 2025	Democratic Party; Italia Viva
17		Gianfranco Palmisano	23 May 2025	Incumbent	Democratic Party

== Sources ==
- Fonseca, Cosimo Damiano (2007). La provincia di Taranto (in Italian). Taranto: Scorpione Editrice.
- "Storia amministrativa dell'ente". Ministero dell'Interno.
