= Ippazio Stefano =

Italian politician and physician

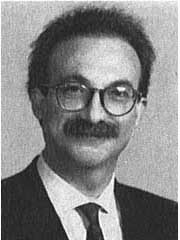

Mayor of Taranto
- In office 14 June 2007 – 29 June 2017
- Preceded by: Rossana Di Bello
- Succeeded by: Rinaldo Melucci

Member of the Senate
- In office 23 April 1992 – 8 May 1996
- Constituency: Taranto

Personal details
- Born: 25 August 1945 (age 81) Casarano, Italy
- Party: PCI (till 1991); PDS (1991-1996); PRC (2007-2010); SEL (2010-2017); SI (since 2017)
- Education: University of Bari
- Occupation: Physician

Ippazio Stefano (born 25 August 1945) is an Italian politician and physician.

Stefano was born in Casarano, Italy. He was a member of the Left Ecology Freedom party, and he joined the Italian Left in 2017.

Stefano was elected member of the Senate of Italy in 1992 and 1994. He served as mayor of Taranto from 14 June 2007 to 26 June 2017.

== See also ==
- List of mayors of Taranto
- 1992 Italian general election
- 1994 Italian general election
- 2007 Italian local elections
- 2012 Italian local elections
