= City Council of Rome =

Legislative council of the City of Rome

Capitoline Assembly Assemblea Capitolina

History
- Founded: 29 November 1870

Leadership
- President: Svetlana Celli, PD since 4 November 2021
- Mayor: Roberto Gualtieri, PD since 21 October 2021

Structure
- Seats: 48
- Political groups: Mayoral majority (29): PD (18); Gualtieri List (5); SCE (2); RF (2); DemoS (1); EV (1); Opposition (19): FdI (5); M5S (4); A (3); IV (2); Lega (2); Raggi List (1); NM (1)
- Length of term: 5 years

Elections
- Last election: 3–4 October 2021
- Next election: Between 15 April and 15 June 2027

Meeting place
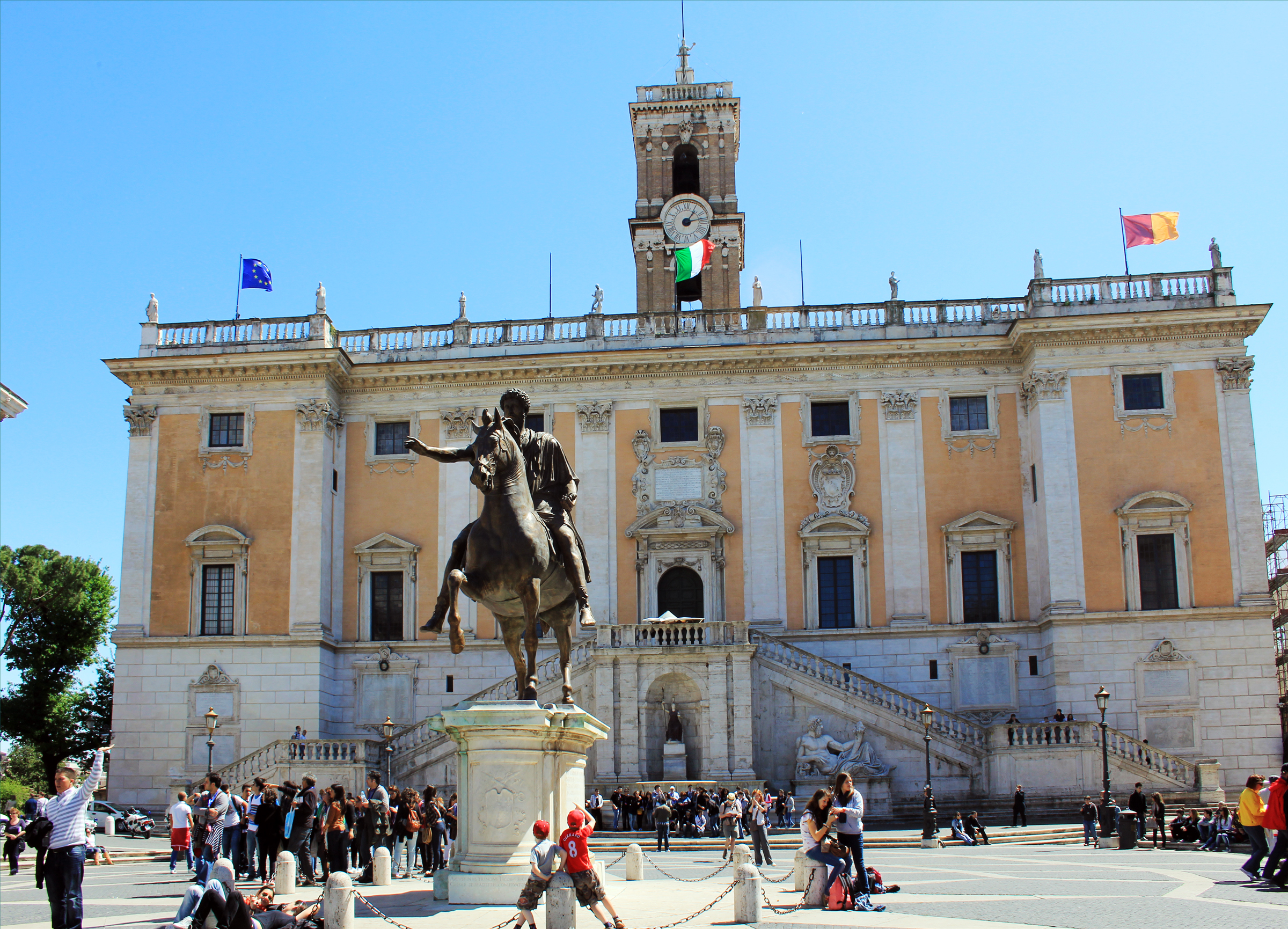
- Palazzo Senatorio, Piazza del Campidoglio – Rome

Website
- Roma Capitale – Assemblea Capitolina

The City Council of Rome or Capitoline Assembly (Italian: Assemblea Capitolina; Romanesco: Assembrea Capitorina, Er Comune/Campidojo) is the top tier legislative body of Rome, Italy. It consists of the directly elected mayor of Rome and of an elected 48-member assembly. It represents a legislative body which can also control the mayor's policy guidelines and be able to enforce their resignation by a motion of no confidence.

The city council is elected for a five-year term and is based on a direct choice for the candidate with a preference vote: the candidate with the majority of the preferences is elected. The number of seats for each party is determined by a mechanism of majority bonus.

The city council meets at Palazzo Senatorio, seated in Piazza del Campidoglio.

== Composition ==
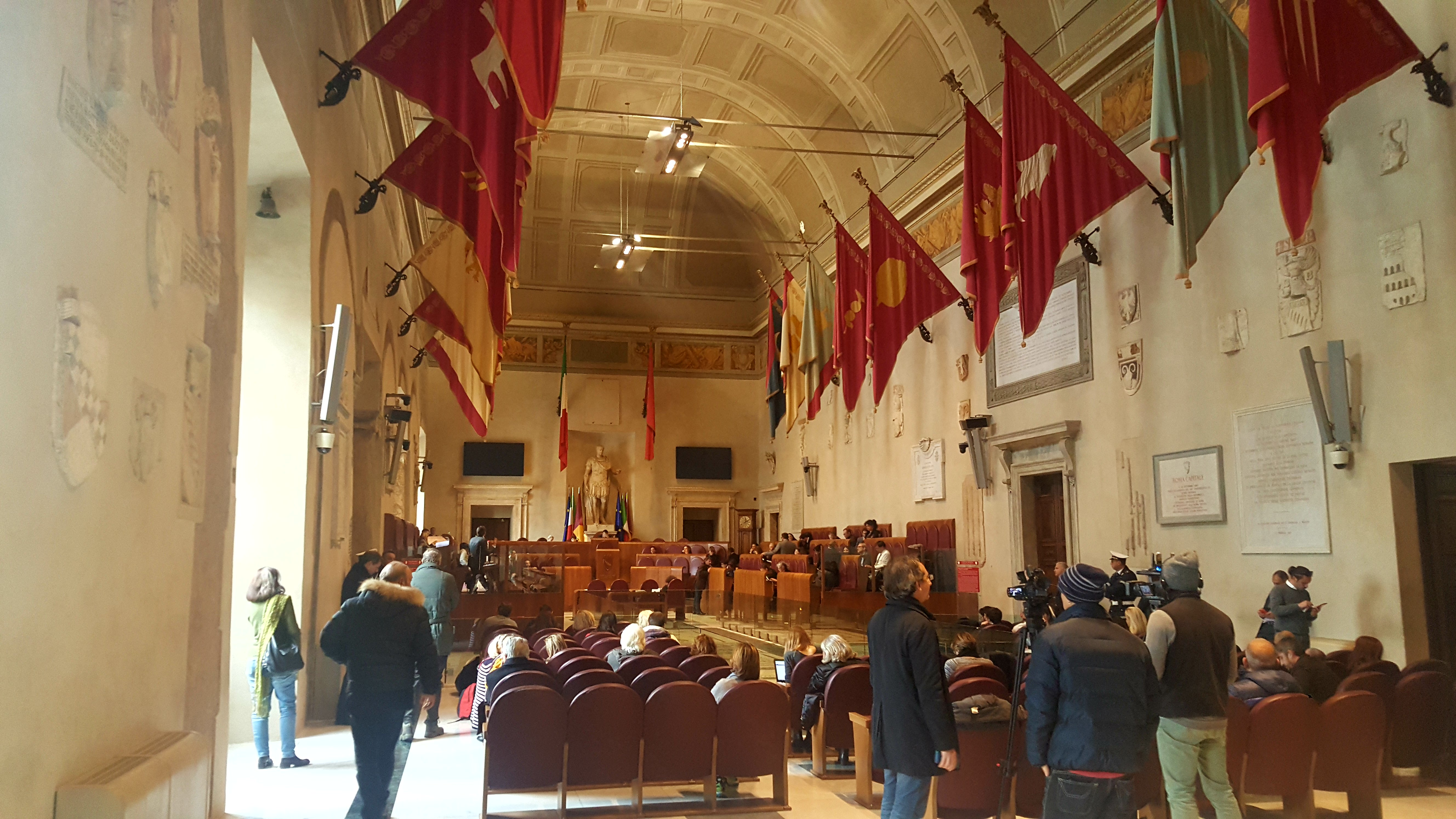
The Council meeting room.

The political system of the Comuni of Italy was changed in 1993, when a semi-presidential system for the mayoral election was introduced. If until that year the council was elected under a pure proportional system and the council had the power to elect and dismiss the mayor of Rome, since 1993 the mayor and the council are jointly elected by citizens, with an electoral law that assures to the elected mayor a political majority in the council.

Under this system, the election of the mayor is prior over the election of the council. Voters express a direct choice for the mayor or an indirect choice voting for the party of the candidate's coalition and this gives a result whereby the winning candidate is able to claim majority support in the new council. The candidate who is elected mayor has always a majority of 62% of seats (29 seats) in the city council, which will support him during his term. The seats for each party of the coalition which wins the majority is determined proportionally.

In this type of system, the council is generally elected for a five-year term, but, if the mayor suffers a vote of no confidence, resigns or dies, under the simul stabunt, simul cadent clause introduced in 1993 (literally they will stand together or they will fall together), also the Council is dissolved and a snap election is called.

The City Committee (Italian: giunta comunale), the executive body of the city, chosen and presided directly by the mayor, is generally composed by members of the city council, which lost their membership into the assembly.

=== Current composition (2021–2027) ===
The Capitoline Assembly is currently composed of the following political groups:

Party	Seats	Status
Democratic Party (PD)	18 / 48	In government
Brothers of Italy (FdI)	5 / 48	In opposition
Gualtieri for Mayor	5 / 48	In government
Five Star Movement (M5S)	4 / 48	In opposition
Action (A)	3 / 48	In opposition
Civic Ecologic Left (SCE)	2 / 48	In government
Future Rome (RF)	2 / 48	In government
Italia Viva (IV)	2 / 48	In opposition
League (Lega)	2 / 48	In opposition
Solidary Democracy (DemoS)	1 / 48	In government
Green Europe (EV)	1 / 48	In government
Raggi for Mayor	1 / 48	In opposition
Us Moderates (NM)	1 / 48	In opposition

By coalition:

Coalition	Seats	Status
Centre-left coalition	29 / 48	Mayoral majority
Centre-right coalition	9 / 48	Opposition
Action – Italia Viva	5 / 48	Opposition
Five Star Movement	5 / 48	Opposition

=== City Committee (2021–2027) ===
The current giunta is composed by 12 members and has been in office since 4 November 2021:

Portfolio	Officeholder	Party
Mayor	Roberto Gualtieri	PD
Deputy Mayor	Silvia Scozzese	Ind
Budget	Silvia Scozzese	Ind
Environment and Waste management	Sabrina Alfonsi	PD
Suburbs, Demographic services and Administrative decentralization	Giuseppe Battaglia	PD
Social policies and Social welfare	Barbara Funari	DemoS
Housing	Andrea Tobia Zevi	Ind
Equality and Attractiveness	Monica Lucarelli	Ind
Sport, Tourism and Events	Alessandro Onorato	Ind
Mobility	Eugenio Patanè	PD
Education	Claudia Pratelli	SCE
Public Works and Infrastructures	Ornella Segnalini	Ind
Culture	Massimiliano Smerigilio	SCE
Urban planning	Maurizio Veloccia	PD

== Functions ==
The council acts as the supreme legislative body of the city. It is convened and chaired by a speaker (president del consiglio comunale) appointed by the council itself.

The council can decide over programs and public works projects, institution and system of taxes, the general rules for the use of goods and services, forecasting and reporting financial statements. Resolution basic acts attributed by law to its competence are the municipal statute, the regulations, the general criteria on the structure of offices and services.

== Presidency ==
This is a list of the presidents (Italian: presidenti del consiglio comunale) of the city council since the 1993 electoral reform:

Name	Period		Legislature start date
Teodoro Buontempo (MSI)	7 December 1993	12 September 1994	5 December 1993
Enrico Gasbarra (PDS)	12 September 1994	25 March 1997	5 December 1993
Luisa Laurelli (PDS)	7 April 1997	17 November 1997	5 December 1993
Luisa Laurelli (PDS)	11 December 1997	8 January 2001	17 November 1997
Council suspended (8 January 2001 – 1 June 2001)
Giuseppe Mannino (Ind)	26 June 2001	1 June 2006	1 June 2001
Mirko Coratti (Ind)	3 July 2006	13 February 2008	1 June 2006
Council suspended (13 February 2008 – 28 April 2008)
Marco Pomarici (PdL)	26 May 2008	12 June 2013	28 April 2008
Mirko Coratti (PD)	1 July 2013	2 December 2014	12 June 2013
Valeria Baglio (PD)	2 December 2014	31 October 2015	12 June 2013
Council suspended (31 October 2015 – 22 June 2016)
Marcello De Vito (M5S)	7 July 2016	21 October 2021	22 June 2016
Svetlana Celli (PD)	4 November 2021	Incumbent	21 October 2021

== Political composition ==
=== Historical composition ===
Election	DC	PCI	PSI	PLI	PRI	PSDI	MSI	UQ	Monarchists	Others
10 November 1946	17	30		4	6	0	0	17	5	1
12 October 1947	27	28		1	5	0	3	8	4	4
25 May 1952	39	16		6	3	4	8	0	3	1
27 May 1956	27	20	9	3	1	3	10	0	2	1
6 November 1960	28	19	11	3	1	3	12	0	3	0
10 June 1962	24	19	10	6	1	5	13	0	2	0
12 June 1966	26	21	6	9	1	8	7	0	1	1
13 June 1971	24	21	7	3	3	8	13	0	0	1
20 June 1976	27	30	6	1	3	3	8	0	0	2
21 June 1981	25	31	8	2	3	4	7	0	0	0
12 May 1985	28	26	8	2	3	3	7	0	0	3
29 October 1989	27	23	11	1	3	2	6	0	0	6

Election	Majority	Opposition	Total	Mayor
21 November 1993	Centre-left (Progressives) 36 / 60	MSI 14 / 60 DC 6 / 60 PRC 3 / 60 PSI–PRI 1 / 60	60	Francesco Rutelli (1993–2001)
16 November 1997	Centre-left (The Olive Tree) 36 / 60	Centre-right (Pole for Freedoms) 23 / 60 MS–FT 1 / 60	60	Francesco Rutelli (1993–2001)
13 May 2001	Centre-left (The Olive Tree) 36 / 60	Centre-right (House of Freedoms) 24 / 60	60	Walter Veltroni (2001–2008)
28 May 2006	Centre-left (The Union) 38 / 60	Centre-right (House of Freedoms) 22 / 60	60	Walter Veltroni (2001–2008)
13 April 2008 (snap election)	Centre-right 36 / 60	Centre-left 22 / 60 UDC 1 / 60 LD 1 / 60	60	Gianni Alemanno (2008–2013)
26 May 2013	Centre-left 29 / 48	Centre-right 12 / 48 M5S 4 / 48 Marchini List 3 / 48	48	Ignazio Marino (2013–2015)
5 June 2016 (snap election)	M5S 29 / 48	Centre-left 9 / 48 FdI 6 / 48 FI 4 / 48	48	Virginia Raggi (2016–2021)

=== Current composition ===
Election	Majority	Opposition	Total	Mayor
3 October 2021	Centre-left 29 / 48	Centre-right 9 / 48 M5S 5 / 48 A–IV 5 / 48	48	Roberto Gualtieri (since 2021)

Summary of the 3–4 October 2021 Rome City Council election results
Parties and coalitions		Votes	%	Seats
Democratic Party (Partito Democratico)	PD	166,194	16.38	18
Gualtieri for Mayor (Gualtieri Sindaco)	GS	54,779	5.40	5
Civic Ecologic Left (Sinistra Civica Ecologista)	SCE	20,501	2.02	2
Future Rome (Roma Futura)	RF	20,028	1.97	2
Solidary Democracy (Democrazia Solidale)	DemoS	9,610	0.95	1
Green Europe (Europa Verde)	EV	9,354	0.92	1
Italian Socialist Party (Partito Socialista Italiano)	PSI	2,841	0.28	0
Gualtieri coalition (Centre-left)		283,307	27.92	29
Brothers of Italy (Fratelli d'Italia)	FdI	176,809	17.42	5
League (Lega)	Lega	60,183	5.93	2
Forza Italia–Union of the Centre (Forza Italia–Unione di Centro)	FI-UDC	36,444	3.59	2
Michetti for Mayor (Michetti Sindaco)	MS	25,048	2.47	0
Reinassance (Rinascimento)		18,659	1.84	0
European Liberal Party	PLE	1,371	0.14	0
Michetti coalition (Centre-right)		318,514	31.39	9 (Note: Even if the coalition received more votes, the candidate lost on the second round and was not able to win the majority bonus, which was given to the winner.)
Calenda for Mayor (Calenda Sindaco)	CS	193,477	19.06	5
Five Star Movement (Movimento Cinque Stelle)	M5S	111,668	11.0	4
Raggi for Mayor (Raggi Sindaco)	RS	43,581	4.29	1
Others		24,333	2.41	0
Raggi coalition		179,582	17.70	5
Others		39,958	3.93	0
Total		1,014,838	100.00	48
Votes cast / turnout		1,145,268	48.54	
Eligible voters		2,359,248		
Source: Ministry of the Interior

Notes

Popular vote
Calenda List	19.06%
FdI	17.42%
PD	16.38%
M5S	11.00%
Lega	5.93%
Gualtieri List	5.40%
Others	24.81%

Council Seats
PD	37.50%
Calenda List	10.41%
FdI	10.41%
Gualtieri List	10.41%
M5S	8.33%
Lega	4.16%
Others	18.75%

Popular vote (coalition)
Centre-right	31.39%
Centre-left	27.92%
Calenda's coalition	19.06%
Raggi's coalition	17.70%

Council Seats (coalition)
Centre-left	60.43%
Centre-right	18.75%
Calenda's coalition	10.41%
Raggi's coalition	10.41%
