= 2008 Rome municipal election =

Italian municipal election

- 13–14 April 2008 (first round); 27–28 April 2008 (second round)
- Turnout: 73.7% ▲7.7 pp (first round); 63.1% ▼10.6 pp (second round)
- Mayoral election
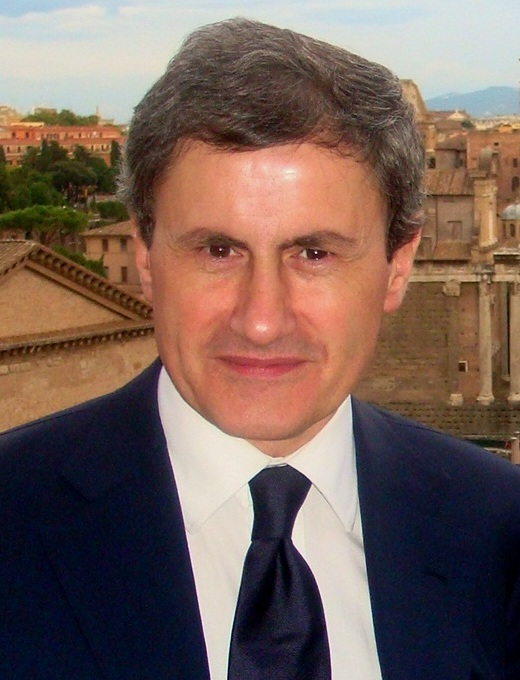

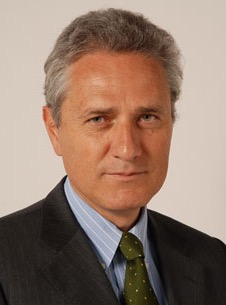
Candidate	Gianni Alemanno	Francesco Rutelli
Party	PdL	PD
Alliance	Centre-right	Centre-left
1st Round vote	675,111	759,252
Percentage	40.7%	45.8%
2nd Round vote	783,725	676,850
Percentage	53.7%	46.3%
Mayor before election
Mario Morcone
(Special commissioner)
Elected mayor
Gianni Alemanno
PdL
- City Council election
- All 60 seats in City Council; 31 seats needed for a majority
Party	Leader	Vote %	Seats	+/–
Centre-right	Gianni Alemanno	39.62	36	+14
Centre-left	Francesco Rutelli	46.70	22	−16
Tricolour Flame	Francesco Storace	3.37	1	
Union of the Centre	Luciano Ciocchetti	3.31	1	
This lists parties that won seats. See the complete results below.

Snap municipal elections were held in Rome on 13–14 and 27–28 April 2008 to elect the Mayor of Rome and 60 members of the City Council, as well as the nineteen presidents and more than 400 councillors of the 19 municipi in which the municipality was divided. The first round of the elections occurred on the same dates of the national general election.

The elections were called just two years after the previous ones since the incumbent mayor Walter Veltroni (PD) resigned on 13 February 2008 to run as the main candidate of the centre-left coalition in the general election.

The centre-right coalition candidate Gianni Alemanno, who was defeated by Veltroni in 2006, faced the incumbent Minister of Culture and Deputy Prime Minister Francesco Rutelli, who had previously hold the position of Mayor of Rome from 1993 to 2001.

Since none of the candidates obtained the majority of votes on the first round, a second round vote was held on 27–28 April 2008. As a result, Gianni Alemanno unexpectedly won nearly 54% of votes on the second round, becoming the first centre-right directly elected mayor of Rome.

== Background ==
Following the fall of Prodi's government in January 2008, Veltroni, as national secretary of the newborn Democratic Party (PD), was chosen to run as the main candidate for the centre-left coalition in the April snap general election and resigned to concentrate on the national campaign.

=== Mayoral election ===
The centre-right coalition was led by Gianni Alemanno (PdL). Alemanno rejected a formal alliance with the far-right parties, but his critics emphasized that his victory was greeted by crowds of supporters, among them far right skinheads.

The centre-left coalition was led by Francesco Rutelli, who continued to maintain a huge popularity across the city.

== Voting system ==
The voting system is used for all mayoral elections in Italy, in the city with a population higher than 15,000 inhabitants. Under this system voters express a direct choice for the mayor or an indirect choice voting for the party of the candidate's coalition. If no candidate receives 50% of votes, the top two candidates go to a second round after two weeks. This gives a result whereby the winning candidate may be able to claim majority support, although it is not guaranteed.

For municipi the voting system is the same, not referred to the mayor but to the president of the municipio.

The election of the city council is based on a direct choice for the candidate with a preference vote: the candidate with the majority of the preferences is elected. The number of the seats for each party is determined proportionally.

== Parties and candidates ==
This is a list of the major parties (and their respective leaders) which participated in the election.

Political party or alliance	Constituent lists	Candidate
Centre-left coalition	Democratic Party	Francesco Rutelli
Centre-left coalition	The Left – The Rainbow	Francesco Rutelli
Centre-left coalition	Bonino List	Francesco Rutelli
Centre-left coalition	Others	Francesco Rutelli
The Right – Tricolour Flame		Francesco Storace
Union of the Centre		Luciano Ciocchetti
Centre-right coalition	The People of Freedom	Gianni Alemanno
Centre-right coalition	Movement for Autonomy	Gianni Alemanno
Centre-right coalition	Others	Gianni Alemanno

== Results ==
Summary of the 2008 Rome City Council and Mayoral election results
Candidates	1st round		2nd round		Leader's seat	Parties	Votes	%	Seats
Candidates	Votes	%	Votes	%	Leader's seat	Parties	Votes	%	Seats
Gianni Alemanno	675,111	40.73	783,725	53.66	–	The People of Freedom	559,559	36.58	35
Gianni Alemanno	675,111	40.73	783,725	53.66	–	Alemanno for Mayor	18,734	1.22	1
Gianni Alemanno	675,111	40.73	783,725	53.66	–	The People of Life	10,194	0.67	–
Gianni Alemanno	675,111	40.73	783,725	53.66	–	Movement for Autonomy	9,185	0.60	–
Gianni Alemanno	675,111	40.73	783,725	53.66	–	The Voice of Consumers	5,196	0.34	–
Gianni Alemanno	675,111	40.73	783,725	53.66	–	Italian Republican Party	3,308	0.22	–
Gianni Alemanno	675,111	40.73	783,725	53.66	–	Total	606,176	39.62	36 (Note: Even if the coalition didn't receive the majority of votes, no other alliance was able to obtain overall more than 50% of votes. Once its mayoral candidate won the second round, the coalition was awarded the majority bonus granted by the electoral law to the alliance whose candidate is elected mayor.)
Francesco Rutelli	759,252	45.80	676,850	46.34	check	Democratic Party	520,723	34.04	17
Francesco Rutelli	759,252	45.80	676,850	46.34	check	The Left – The Rainbow	69,079	4.52	2
Francesco Rutelli	759,252	45.80	676,850	46.34	check	Italy of Values	50,704	3.31	1
Francesco Rutelli	759,252	45.80	676,850	46.34	check	Rutelli List	41,880	2.74	1
Francesco Rutelli	759,252	45.80	676,850	46.34	check	Under30 for Rutelli	11,486	0.75	–
Francesco Rutelli	759,252	45.80	676,850	46.34	check	Bonino List	10,427	0.68	–
Francesco Rutelli	759,252	45.80	676,850	46.34	check	Moderates for Rome	7,470	0.49	–
Francesco Rutelli	759,252	45.80	676,850	46.34	check	Democratic Union for Consumers	2,699	0.18	–
Francesco Rutelli	759,252	45.80	676,850	46.34	check	Total	714,468	46.70	21
Francesco Storace	55,041	3.32	–	–	–	The Right – Tricolour Flame	51,614	3.37	1
Luciano Ciocchetti	52,055	3.14	–	–	–	Union of the Centre	50,682	3.31	1
Serenetta Monti	43,966	2.65	–	–	–	Friends of Beppe Grillo	40,389	2.64	–
Franco Grillini	13,604	0.82	–	–	–	Socialist Party	11,413	0.75	–
Michele Baldi	13,002	0.78	–	–	–	Baldi List	11,913	0.78	–
Mario Baccini	12,179	0.73	–	–	–	The White Rose	11,659	0.76	–
Dario Di Francesco	12,041	0.73	–	–	–	Forza Roma	4,911	0.32	–
Dario Di Francesco	12,041	0.73	–	–	–	Talking Cricket List	4,895	0.32	–
Dario Di Francesco	12,041	0.73	–	–	–	Avanti Lazio	1,792	0.12	–
Dario Di Francesco	12,041	0.73	–	–	–	Total	11,598	0.76	–
Armando Morgia	8,724	0.53	–	–	–	Critical Left	8,207	0.54	–
Susanna Capristo	5,011	0.30	–	–	–	Workers' Communist Party	4,608	0.30	–
David Gramiccioli	3,556	0.21	–	–	–	Dolphin National Movement	3,309	0.22	–
Pietro De Stefani	2,699	0.16	–	–	–	Pensions and Work	1,883	0.12	–
Pietro De Stefani	2,699	0.16	–	–	–	The Green Thing	673	0.04	–
Pietro De Stefani	2,699	0.16	–	–	–	Total	2,556	0.17	–
Umberto Calabrese	1,342	0.08	–	–	–	My Italy	1,279	0.08	–
Total	1,657,583	100.00	1,460,575	100.00	1		1,529,871	100.00	59
Eligible voters	2,347,502	100.00	2,347,502	100.00					
Did not vote	618,215	26.34	865,707	36.88					
Voted	1,729,287	73.66	1,481,795	63.12					
Blank or invalid ballots	71,704	4.14	21,220	1.43					
Total valid votes	1,657,583	95.86	1,460,575	98.57					
Source: Ministry of the Interior

== Election in the municipi ==
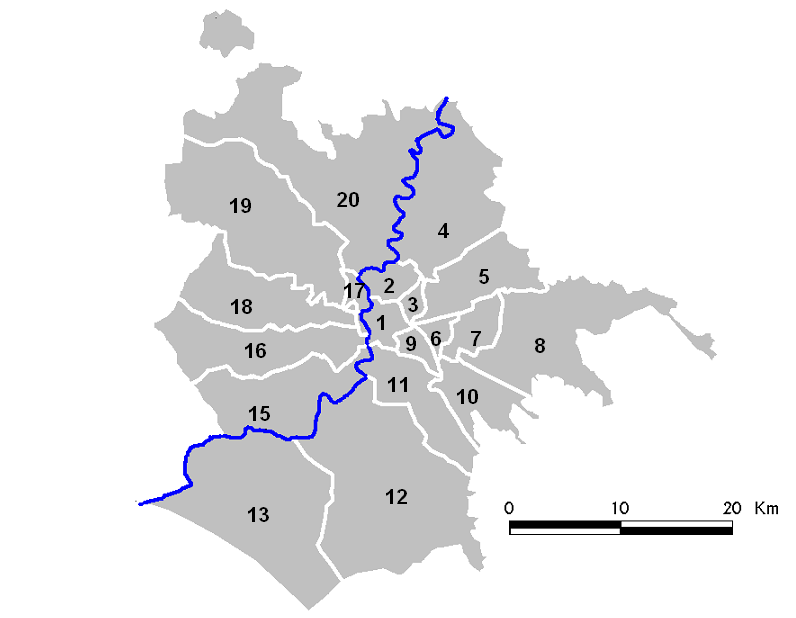

Table below shows the results for each municipio with the percentage for each coalition on the first round:

Municipio	Centre-left	Centre-right	Elected President	Party
I	50.8	34.1	Orlando Corsetti	PD
III	51.0	37.9	Dario Marcucci	PD
V	52.7	35.8	Ivano Caradonna	PD
VI	53.8	35.2	Gianmarco Palmieri	PD
IX	54.7	34.9	Susana Ana Maria Fantino	SA
X	51.8	36.2	Sandro Medici	SA
XI	53.1	32.7	Andrea Catarci	SA
XV	53.0	38.7	Giovanni Paris	PD
XVI	50.7	37.9	Fabio Bellini	PD
XVII	50.0	41.9	Antonella De Giusti	PD

Table below shows the results for each municipio with the percentage for each coalition on the second round:

Municipio	Centre-left	Centre-right	Elected President	Party
II	46.5	53.5	Sara De Angelis	PdL
IV	49.6	50.4	Cristiano Bonelli	PdL
VII	51.6	48.4	Roberto Mastrantonio	SA
VIII	47.5	52.5	Massimo Lorenzotti	PdL
XII	46.6	53.4	Pasquale Calzetta	PdL
XIII	48.7	51.3	Giacomo Vizzani	PdL
XVIII	44.6	55.4	Daniele Giannini	PdL
XIX	46.5	53.5	Alfredo Miloni	PdL
XX	38.6	61.4	Gianni Giacomini	PdL

Source: Municipality of Rome - Electoral Service
