= Giancarlo Cito =

Italian politician and businessman (1945–2025)

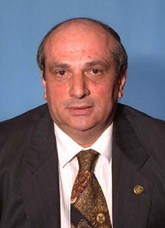
- Cito in 1996

Mayor of Taranto
- In office 5 December 1993 – 24 February 1996
- Preceded by: Roberto Della Torre
- Succeeded by: Gaetano De Cosmo

Member of the Chamber of Deputies
- In office 8 May 1996 – 29 May 2001
- Constituency: Taranto

Personal details
- Born: 12 August 1945 Taranto, Italy
- Died: 11 May 2025 (aged 79) Taranto, Italy
- Party: MSI (till 1979); LAM (1992–2025)
- Height: 1.73 m (5 ft 8 in)
- Education: University of Bari
- Occupation: Politician, businessman

Giancarlo Cito (12 August 1945 – 11 May 2025) was an Italian politician and businessman who served as the Mayor of Taranto.

== Life and career ==
In 1985, Cito founded the local television station Antenna Taranto 6 (AT6); his channel found great success and Cito became very popular in his city also because, intercepting the dissatisfaction with the bankruptcy management of the city administration led by the Christian Democracy and the Socialist Party in the early 1990s, he created a political column in which he denounced the offences committed by local administrators. In 1997 some of his family members bought the historic Lucanian broadcaster Tele Basilicata Matera, whose operational headquarters were soon transferred to Taranto. Between 2003 and 2007, during his detention to serve the sentence for external competition in association with organized crime, he graduated in Legal Sciences.

In the 1970s, Cito joined the Italian Social Movement, from which he was expelled because of his extremism. In 1992, Cito founded his own party: AT6 – Southern Action League, a far-right meridionalist party.

Cito was a candidate for mayor of Taranto in the municipal elections of 1993, winning the run-off against the progressive candidate Gaetano Minervini, who was often insulted by Cito during the electoral campaign through his television channel. In 1996, Cito left the office of mayor in order to be a candidate for the Chamber of Deputies during the 1996 general elections, managing to gain a seat in Parliament.

In 1997, he became a provocative candidate for the office of mayor of Milan, contrasting his unbridled meridionalism to the northern tendencies of the Lega Nord, while in 2000 he was a candidate for the role of president of Apulia during the 2000 regional elections.

In 1997, Cito was accused of collusion with the Sacra Corona Unita: he was found guilty in 2002 and imprisoned between 2003 and 2007. During the years in jail, Cito managed to graduate in Legal Sciences. In May 2004, he tried to commit suicide by cutting his wrist veins; however, he was rescued and saved in time.

In 2007, due to the accusation of collusion with organized crime, unable to be candidate again as mayor, he supported his son Mario, who became the party candidate for the role of mayor of Taranto during the elections of 2007, 2012 and 2017.

Cito died on 11 May 2025, after having been resident at a Taranto nursing home for some time. He was 79.
