= 2006 Rome municipal election =

Municipal election in Rome

- 28–29 May 2006
- Turnout: 66.0% ▼13.4 pp
- Mayoral election
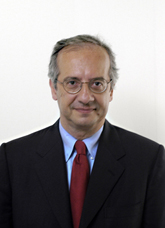

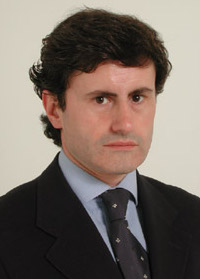
Candidate	Walter Veltroni	Gianni Alemanno
Party	DS	AN
Alliance	Centre-left	Centre-right
Popular vote	926,932	559,810
Percentage	61.4%	37.1%
Mayor before election
Walter Veltroni
DS
Elected mayor
Walter Veltroni
DS
- City Council election
- All 60 seats in City Council; 31 seats needed for a majority
Party	Leader	Vote %	Seats	+/–
Centre-left	Walter Veltroni	61.36	38	+2
Centre-right	Gianni Alemanno	37.03	22	−2
This lists parties that won seats. See the complete results below.

Municipal elections were held in Rome on 28–29 May 2006 to elect the Mayor of Rome and 60 members of the City Council, as well as the nineteen presidents and more than 400 councillors of the 19 municipi in which the municipality was divided.

The two main candidates were the incumbent left-wing Walter Veltroni and the national-conservative Minister of Agriculture Gianni Alemanno.

As a result, the incumbent mayor Walter Veltroni was re-elected for a second five-year term by a landslide.

== Background ==
In April 2006 national general election saw a narrow victory for the centre-left coalition led by Romano Prodi over the incumbent Prime Minister Silvio Berlusconi, leader of the centre-right coalition House of Freedoms. To prevent a possible political advantage for the centre-left coalition, Berlusconi had previously fixed the date of the general election in early April, avoiding the municipal elections (which interested Rome and many other big cities such as Milan, Naples and Turin) to take place on the same day, as it actually happened in 2001. Berlusconi stated this was due to his fear that good government by centre-left mayors could favour the centre-left coalition in the general election. The date for municipal elections was ultimately fixed by the Government for 28–29 May 2006.

=== Mayoral election ===
The incumbent mayor Walter Veltroni, whose popularity had hugely increased during his term in office, was then widely considered one of the most popular left-wing politicians in Italy. His candidacy was supported by the new centre-left platform, called The Union. His main opponent was the incumbent Minister of Agriculture Gianni Alemanno, supported by the centre-right House of Freedoms alliance.

During the campaign Alemanno was heavily criticized for the support, sought and obtained at the national level by Berlusconi, of a number of fascist movements and parties, notably the Social Alternative of Alessandra Mussolini, granddaughter of the former dictator of Italy. Alemanno himself sparked public outrage after appearing live with a celtic cross on his neck during a TV show just a week before the election.

== Voting system ==
The voting system is used for all mayoral elections in Italy, in the city with a population higher than 15,000 inhabitants. Under this system voters express a direct choice for the mayor or an indirect choice voting for the party of the candidate's coalition. If no candidate receives 50% of votes, the top two candidates go to a second round after two weeks. This gives a result whereby the winning candidate may be able to claim majority support, although it is not guaranteed.

The election of the City Council is based on a direct choice for the candidate with a preference vote: the candidate with the majority of the preferences is elected. The number of the seats for each party is determined proportionally.

== Parties and candidates ==
This is a list of the major parties (and their respective leaders) which participated in the election.

Political party or alliance	Constituent lists	Candidate
Centre-left coalition (The Union)	The Olive Tree	Walter Veltroni
Centre-left coalition (The Union)	Veltroni List	Walter Veltroni
Centre-left coalition (The Union)	Communist Refoundation Party	Walter Veltroni
Centre-left coalition (The Union)	Party of Italian Communists	Walter Veltroni
Centre-left coalition (The Union)	Rose in the Fist	Walter Veltroni
Centre-left coalition (The Union)	Federation of the Greens	Walter Veltroni
Centre-left coalition (The Union)	Italy of Values	Walter Veltroni
Centre-left coalition (The Union)	Others	Walter Veltroni
Centre-right coalition (House of Freedoms)	Forza Italia	Gianni Alemanno
Centre-right coalition (House of Freedoms)	National Alliance	Gianni Alemanno
Centre-right coalition (House of Freedoms)	Union of Christian and Centre Democrats	Gianni Alemanno
Centre-right coalition (House of Freedoms)	Christian Democracy for Autonomies	Gianni Alemanno
Centre-right coalition (House of Freedoms)	Social Action	Gianni Alemanno
Centre-right coalition (House of Freedoms)	Others	Gianni Alemanno

== Results ==
Summary of the 2006 Rome City Council and Mayoral election results
Candidates	Votes	%	Leader's seat	Parties	Votes	%	Seats
Walter Veltroni	926,932	61.42	–	The Olive Tree	441,914	33.82	23
Walter Veltroni	926,932	61.42	–	Veltroni List	80,328	6.15	4
Walter Veltroni	926,932	61.42	–	Communist Refoundation Party	70,918	5.43	3
Walter Veltroni	926,932	61.42	–	Federation of the Greens	62,262	4.76	3
Walter Veltroni	926,932	61.42	–	Moderates	57,339	4.39	2
Walter Veltroni	926,932	61.42	–	Italy of Values	29,822	2.28	1
Walter Veltroni	926,932	61.42	–	Rose in the Fist	25,695	1.97	1
Walter Veltroni	926,932	61.42	–	Party of Italian Communists	19,883	1.52	1
Walter Veltroni	926,932	61.42	–	Rainbow Rome	8,524	0.65	–
Walter Veltroni	926,932	61.42	–	Consumers' List	2,046	0.16	–
Walter Veltroni	926,932	61.42	–	United Consumers	1,943	0.15	–
Walter Veltroni	926,932	61.42	–	Italian Democratic Socialist Party	1,157	0.09	–
Walter Veltroni	926,932	61.42	–	Total	801,831	61.36	38
Gianni Alemanno	559,810	37.09	check	National Alliance	254,337	19.46	13
Gianni Alemanno	559,810	37.09	check	Forza Italia	132,869	10.17	6
Gianni Alemanno	559,810	37.09	check	Union of Christian and Centre Democrats	56,763	4.34	2
Gianni Alemanno	559,810	37.09	check	Love for Rome	10,150	0.78	–
Gianni Alemanno	559,810	37.09	check	Social Action	7,553	0.58	–
Gianni Alemanno	559,810	37.09	check	Christian Democracy for Autonomies	7,276	0.56	–
Gianni Alemanno	559,810	37.09	check	New Italian Socialist Party	5,333	0.41	–
Gianni Alemanno	559,810	37.09	check	Forza Roma	3,466	0.27	–
Gianni Alemanno	559,810	37.09	check	Italian Republican Party	2,057	0.16	–
Gianni Alemanno	559,810	37.09	check	Avanti Lazio	1,327	0.10	–
Gianni Alemanno	559,810	37.09	check	Independent Movement for Animal Rights	850	0.07	–
Gianni Alemanno	559,810	37.09	check	Pensions, Houses and Work	698	0.05	–
Gianni Alemanno	559,810	37.09	check	New Generation	661	0.05	–
Gianni Alemanno	559,810	37.09	check	Real Democratic Party	538	0.04	–
Gianni Alemanno	559,810	37.09	check	Total	483,878	37.03	21
Rita Casillo	5,816	0.39	–	Communist Initiative	5,334	0.41	
Luca Romagnoli	4,015	0.27	–	Tricolour Flame	3,848	0.29	–
David Gramiccioli	3,530	0.23	–	Dolphin National Movement	3,149	0.24	–
Alessandra Sarti Magi	2,655	0.18	–	New Force – National Social Front	2,603	0.20	–
Valentina Valenti	2,593	0.17	–	Third Pole	2,650	0.20	–
Roberto De Santis	1,091	0.07	–	Ecologists	943	0.07	–
Umberto Nardinocchi	1,076	0.07	–	Active Democracy	985	0.08	–
Marina Larena	707	0.05	–	Humanist Party	631	0.05	–
Stefano Fuccelli	618	0.04	–	European Animalist Party	562	0.04	–
Maurizio Giorgetti	351	0.02	–	Italian Dream	303	0.02	–
Total	1,509,194	100.00	1		1,306,717	100.00	59
Eligible voters	2,341,773	100.00					
Did not vote	796,688	34.02					
Voted	1,545,085	65.98					
Blank or invalid ballots	35,891	2.32					
Total valid votes	1,509,194	97.68					
Source: Ministry of the Interior

== Municipi election ==
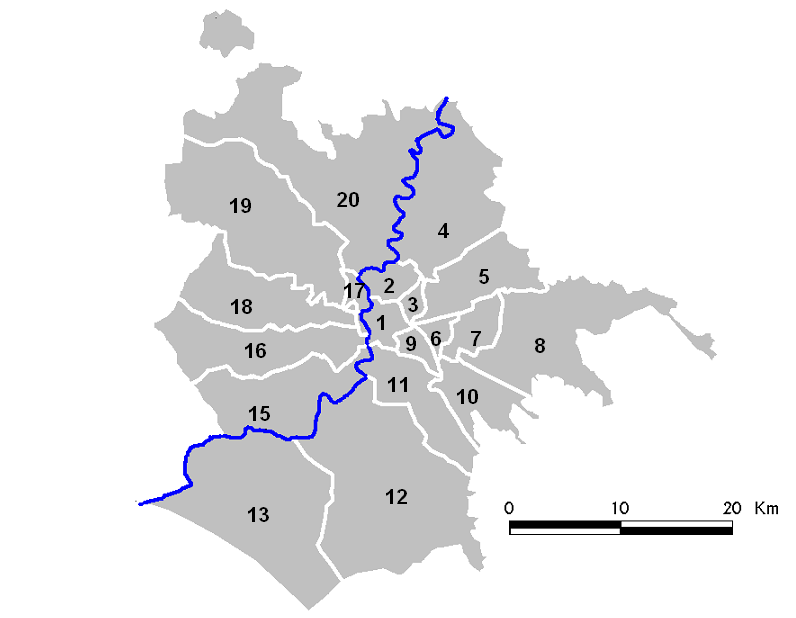

All the presidents of each municipio were elected on the first round. Table below shows the results for each municipio with the percentage for each coalition:

Municipio	The Olive Tree	House of Freedoms	Elected President	Party
I	61.8	37.3	Giuseppe Lobefaro	DL
II	53.9	44.7	Guido Bottini	DS
III	62.8	36.5	Orlando Corsetti	DL
IV	60.7	37.5	Alessandro Cardente	FdV
V	66.0	32.0	Ivano Caradonna	DS
VI	65.5	33.3	Teodoro Giannini	RnP
VII	64.1	34.2	Roberto Mastrantonio	IdV
VIII	62.2	35.9	Fabrizio Scorzoni	DS
IX	60.8	36.2	Susana Ana Maria Fantino	PRC
X	65.4	33.3	Sandro Medici	PRC
XI	64.1	34.3	Andrea Catarci	PRC
XII	57.7	41.8	Patrizia Prestipino	DL
XIII	59.3	39.3	Paolo Ornelli	DS
XV	61.6	37.2	Giovanni Paris	DL
XVI	61.2	37.4	Fabio Bellini	DS
XVII	54.5	44.3	Antonella De Giusti	DL
XVIII	52.1	46.9	Maria Giovanna Filardi	DS
XIX	57.8	40.2	Fabio Lazzara	DS
XX	48.1	50.0	Massimiliano Fasoli	UDC

Source: Municipality of Rome - Electoral Service
