= Rinaldo Melucci =

Italian politician

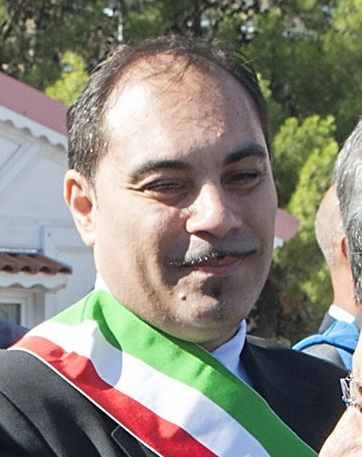

President of the Province of Taranto
- In office 18 September 2022 – 21 February 2025
- Preceded by: Giovanni Gugliotti
- Succeeded by: Gianfranco Palmisano

Mayor of Taranto
- In office 17 June 2022 – 21 February 2025
- Succeeded by: Piero Bitetti
- In office 29 June 2017 – 16 November 2021
- Preceded by: Ippazio Stefano

Personal details
- Born: 26 January 1977 (age 49) Taranto, Italy
- Party: PD (2017-2023); IV (2023; since 2024); Independent (2023-2024)
- Occupation: entrepreneur

Rinaldo Melucci (born 26 January 1977) is an Italian politician.

He was born in Taranto, Italy. Melucci was elected mayor of Taranto on 26 June 2017. He was re-elected for a second term on 13 June 2022.

In 2022, Melucci was elected president of the Province of Taranto.

== See also ==
- 2017 Italian local elections
- 2022 Italian local elections
- List of mayors of Taranto
