= Southern Action League =

Southern Action League Lega d'Azione Meridionale
- Leader: Mario Cito
- Founded: 1992
- Ideology: Meridionalism; National conservatism
- Political position: Far-right
- National affiliation: Italy for the Italians (2018)

The Southern Action League (Lega d'Azione Meridionale, LAM) is a regionalist far-right Italian political party active in Apulia, especially in Taranto.

Its founder Giancarlo Cito, former member of the post-fascist Italian Social Movement (MSI), from which he was expelled for his extreme views, and fierce anti-Lega Nord campaigner, was Mayor of Taranto from 1993 to 1997. The party was represented in the Chamber of Deputies from 1994 to 1996 by Pietro Cerullo, who was elected in the single-seat constituency of Taranto in a close three-horse race, and from 1996 to 2001 by Giancarlo Cito himself, who took 45.9% of the votes in Taranto, beating by a large margin a centre-left candidate and Cerullo, who had left the party to join the Federalists and Liberal Democrats (FLD) and later Forza Italia (FI). In that occasion the party came close to winning its second seat in the Chamber.

The party suffered several setbacks since 2001, when Cito won only 13.9% of the votes in his constituency and failed to be re-elected. Furthermore, between 2003 and 2007, Cito was convicted for Mafia crimes and the party seemed almost completely over. In 2007 the party experienced anyway a resurgence in the municipal election of Taranto, when Mario Cito, son of Giancarlo, won 20.2% of the votes as candidate for Mayor.

In the 2009 provincial election of Taranto, the party won 10.6% of the vote, while supporting the candidate for President of The People of Freedom (PdL).

In the 2012 municipal election of Taranto, Mario Cito won 18.9% in the first round and 30.3% in the run-off, losing to incumbent Mayor Ippazio Stefano.

In 2014 the party joined Forza Italia, but later re-gained its autonomy.

In the 2017 municipal election in Taranto the party won 10.8% of the vote and its candidate, Mario Cito (son of Giancarlo), 12.5%.
