= 1993 Rome municipal election =

First direct elections for Mayor of Rome

- 21 November 1993 (first round); 5 December 1993 (second round)
- Turnout: 78.7% ▼1.6 pp (first round); 79.9% ▲1.2 pp (second round)
- Mayoral election
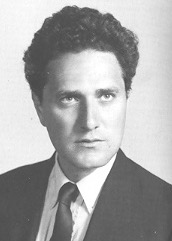

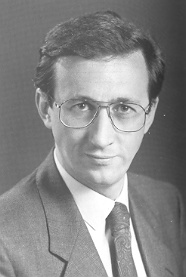
| Candidate | Francesco Rutelli | Gianfranco Fini |
| Party | Greens | MSI |
| Alliance | Progressives | – |
| 1st Round vote | 684,529 | 619,309 |
| Percentage | 39.6% | 35.8% |
| 2nd Round vote | 955,859 | 844,030 |
| Percentage | 53.1% | 46.9% |
Mayor before election
Aldo Camporota
(Special commissioner)
Elected mayor
Francesco Rutelli
FdV
- City Council election
- All 60 seats in City Council; 31 seats needed for a majority
| Party | Leader | Vote % | Seats | +/– |
|---|---|---|---|---|
| Progressives | Francesco Rutelli | 37.21 | 36 | |
| Social Movement | Gianfranco Fini | 33.42 | 14 | |
| Centrist coalition | Carmelo Caruso | 14.25 | 6 | |
| Communist Refoundation | Renato Nicolini | 8.02 | 3 | |
| Others | | | 1 | |
This lists parties that won seats. See the complete results below.

Municipal elections were held in Rome on 21 November and 5 December 1993 to elect the Mayor of Rome and 60 members of the City Council.

For the first time under a new local electoral law, enacted on 25 March 1993, citizens could vote to directly elect the Mayor.

As no candidate won a majority in the first round, a runoff was held between the top two candidates – Francesco Rutelli, a former radical deputy at that time one of the most prominent figure of the environmentalist Federation of the Greens (FdV) and Gianfranco Fini, Giorgio Almirante's pupil and national leader of the neo-fascist Italian Social Movement (MSI) – which Rutelli finally won.

== Background ==
With the Law of 25 March 1993, n. 81 was introduced the direct election of Mayor. In this way the form of government of the city, previously attributed to a parliamentary model, was neared at semi-presidential system. The same law fixed four years term of office for Mayor, later extended to five years.

The first direct-election of the Mayor of Rome took place in a period of changes for the Italian politics: the scandal called Tangentopoli, which highlighted pervasive corruption in the Italian political system, exposed in the 1992 Mani Pulite investigations, led to the collapse of the dominant Christian Democracy party and of its allies in the municipal politics.

=== Mayoral election ===
For the first time a leftist coalition, composed by the former-communist Democratic Party of the Left (PDS) and some other progressives party, took part in the election, presenting Francesco Rutelli as its mayoral candidate. Rutelli was a young politician who had been a member of the Italian Radicals then a member of the newborn Federation of the Greens.

The main opposition to Rutelli's coalition was represented by the neo-fascist candidate Gianfranco Fini. Fini was a young politician considered the inheritor of Giorgio Almirante's political knowledge in the Italian Social Movement (MSI). Fini and his party were quite popular in Rome: their popularity, originated from the Fascist regime, was increased by the political scandal which had invested the historical Christian Democracy (DC) and Italian Socialist Party (PSI). However Fini's popularity continued after the 1993 election, since all the candidates supported by the center-right coalition in the future elections would have been members of neo-fascist party National Alliance (AN).

Although the political crisis, Christian Democracy (DC) presented its candidate, Carmelo Caruso, who was supported also by the weak Italian Democratic Socialist Party (PSDI).

Many other candidates took part in the election, all of them from very small parties, civic lists or associations. The most famous of this small party was the so-called Love Party, which was in favor of sexuality in a libertarian sense and for this reason decided to present as candidate for Mayor the famous pornstars Moana Pozzi.

The election was distinguished by the active involvement of an unprecedented numbers of Italian nobles as either candidates or supporters, including members of the Barberini, Orsini, Chigi, and Borghese families.

== Voting System ==
The voting system is used for all mayoral elections in Italy, in the city with a population higher than 15,000 inhabitants. Under this system voters express a direct choice for the mayor or an indirect choice voting for the party of the candidate's coalition. If no candidate receives 50% of votes, the top two candidates go to a second round after two weeks. This gives a result whereby the winning candidate may be able to claim majority support, although it is not guaranteed.

The election of the City Council is based on a direct choice for the candidate with a preference vote: the candidate with the majority of the preferences is elected. The number of the seats for each party is determined proportionally.

== Parties and candidates ==
This is a list of the major parties (and their respective leaders) which participated in the election.

| Political party or alliance | Constituent lists | Candidate |
|---|---|---|
| Italian Social Movement | | Gianfranco Fini |
| Progressives | Democratic Party of the Left | Francesco Rutelli |
| Progressives | Federation of the Greens | Francesco Rutelli |
| Progressives | Democratic Alliance | Francesco Rutelli |
| Progressives | Pannella List | Francesco Rutelli |
| Centrist coalition | Christian Democracy | Carmelo Caruso |
| Centrist coalition | Union of the Centre | Carmelo Caruso |
| Centrist coalition | Italian Democratic Socialist Party | Carmelo Caruso |
| Communist Refoundation Party | | Renato Nicolini |
| Lay and Reformist Alliance | | Vittorio Ripa di Meana |

== Results ==
Summary of the 1993 Rome City Council and Mayoral election results
| Candidates | 1st round | | 2nd round | | Leader's seat | Parties | Votes | % | Seats |
| Candidates | Votes | % | Votes | % | Leader's seat | Parties | Votes | % | Seats |
|---|---|---|---|---|---|---|---|---|---|
| Francesco Rutelli | 684,529 | 39.55 | 955,859 | 53.11 | – | Democratic Party of the Left | 233,924 | 18.17 | 18 |
| Francesco Rutelli | 684,529 | 39.55 | 955,859 | 53.11 | – | Federation of the Greens | 136,753 | 10.62 | 10 |
| Francesco Rutelli | 684,529 | 39.55 | 955,859 | 53.11 | – | Alliance for Rome | 63,271 | 4.91 | 5 |
| Francesco Rutelli | 684,529 | 39.55 | 955,859 | 53.11 | – | Pannella List | 45,082 | 3.50 | 3 |
| Francesco Rutelli | 684,529 | 39.55 | 955,859 | 53.11 | – | Total | 479,030 | 37.21 | 36 |
| Gianfranco Fini | 619,309 | 35.78 | 844,030 | 46.89 | check | Italian Social Movement | 399,594 | 31.04 | 13 |
| Gianfranco Fini | 619,309 | 35.78 | 844,030 | 46.89 | check | Together for Rome | 30,684 | 2.38 | – |
| Gianfranco Fini | 619,309 | 35.78 | 844,030 | 46.89 | check | Total | 430,278 | 33.42 | 13 |
| Carmelo Caruso | 197,801 | 11.43 | – | – | check | Christian Democracy | 154,552 | 12.00 | 5 |
| Carmelo Caruso | 197,801 | 11.43 | – | – | check | Union of the Centre | 14,392 | 1.12 | – |
| Carmelo Caruso | 197,801 | 11.43 | – | – | check | Italian Democratic Socialist Party | 11,333 | 0.88 | – |
| Carmelo Caruso | 197,801 | 11.43 | – | – | check | Civilization and Progress | 3,160 | 0.25 | – |
| Carmelo Caruso | 197,801 | 11.43 | – | – | check | Total | 183,437 | 14.25 | 5 |
| Renato Nicolini | 143,364 | 8.28 | – | – | check | Communist Refoundation Party | 90,461 | 7.03 | 2 |
| Renato Nicolini | 143,364 | 8.28 | – | – | check | Freeing Rome | 12,798 | 0.99 | – |
| Renato Nicolini | 143,364 | 8.28 | – | – | check | Total | 103,259 | 8.02 | 2 |
| Vittorio Ripa di Meana | 26,064 | 1.51 | – | – | check | Reformist Lay Alliance (PSI–PRI) | 30,818 | 2.39 | – |
| Maria Ida Germontani | 11,770 | 0.68 | – | – | – | Federal Italy League | 13,726 | 1.07 | – |
| Antonio Pappalardo | 9,527 | 0.55 | – | – | – | Solidarity and Democracy | 9,557 | 0.74 | – |
| Laura Scalabrini | 9,164 | 0.53 | – | – | – | Federalist Greens | 10,531 | 0.82 | – |
| Moana Pozzi | 8,977 | 0.52 | – | – | – | Love Party | 7,228 | 0.56 | – |
| Giulio Savelli | 4,198 | 0.24 | – | – | – | Independent Movement for Rome | 3,373 | 0.26 | – |
| Federica Rossi Gasparrini | 4,075 | 0.24 | – | – | – | New Italy | 4,685 | 0.36 | – |
| Gabriella Carlizzi | 3,998 | 0.23 | – | – | – | Christian Party of Democracy | 3,409 | 0.26 | – |
| Mirella Cece | 2,002 | 0.12 | – | – | – | European Liberal Christian Movement | 2,096 | 0.16 | – |
| Rosario Caccamo | 1,948 | 0.11 | – | – | – | People's Movement for Man and the Environment | 1,861 | 0.14 | – |
| Carlo Olivieri | 1,590 | 0.09 | – | – | – | Humanist Alliance | 1,485 | 0.12 | – |
| Pier Vittorio Fiorelli | 1,519 | 0.09 | – | – | – | Rights and Duties | 1,859 | 0.14 | – |
| Rosanna Bartolomei | 882 | 0.05 | – | – | – | Corporatist Democracy | 896 | 0.07 | – |
| Total | 1,730,717 | 100.00 | 1,799,889 | 100.00 | 4 | | 1,287,528 | 100.00 | 56 |
| Eligible voters | 2,317,077 | 100.00 | 2,317,077 | 100.00 | | | | | |
| Did not vote | 492,536 | 21.26 | 466,787 | 20.15 | | | | | |
| Voted | 1,824,541 | 78.74 | 1,850,290 | 79.85 | | | | | |
| Blank or invalid ballots | 93,824 | 5.14 | 50,401 | 2.72 | | | | | |
| Total valid votes | 1,730,717 | 94.86 | 1,799,889 | 97.28 | | | | | |
Source: Ministry of the Interior
