= List of parliamentary groups in Italy =

This article contains a list of parliamentary groups in Italy.

== Parliamentary groups representing a political party ==
Parliamentary groups since 1946.

=== Active parliamentary groups ===
Party	Chamber of Deputies	Senate of the Republic
Democratic Party; Partito Democratico	2007–present	2007–present
Brothers of Italy; Fratelli d'Italia	2013–present	2012–2013, 2018–present
Five Star Movement; Movimento Cinque Stelle	2013–present	2013–present
Forward Italy; Forza Italia	2013–present	2013–present
Lega; Lega	2018–present	2018–present

=== Defunct parliamentary groups ===
Party	Chamber of Deputies (Note: 1946–1948: Constituent Assembly of Italy.)	Senate of the Republic
Christian Democracy; Democrazia Cristiana	1946–1994	1948–1994
Italian Communist Party; Partito Comunista Italiano	1946–1991	1948–1991
Italian Socialist Party; Partito Socialista Italiano	1946–1966, 1969–1994	1948–1966, 1969–1996
Common Man's Front; Fronte dell'Uomo Qualunque	1946–1948	—
Italian Republican Party; Partito Repubblicano Italiano	1946–1953, 1963–1994	1948–1953, 1979–1994
Labour Democratic Party; Partito Democratico del Lavoro	1946–1948	—
Italian Liberal Party; Partito Liberale Italiano	1947–1994	1948–1953, 1963–1976, 1992–1994
Italian Democratic Socialist Party (Note: The party was established as "Socialist Party of Italian Workers" in 1947, it was variously named and was ultimately named "Italian Democratic Socialist Party" in 1952.); Partito Socialista Democratico Italiano	1947–1966, 1969–1994	1948–1953, 1963–1966, 1969–1976, 1979–1992
Monarchist National Party; Partito Nazionale Monarchico	1948–1959	1953–1958
Italian Social Movement; Movimento Sociale Italiano	1953–1994	1953–1958, 1963–1994
People's Monarchist Party; Partito Monarchico Popolare	1954–1959	—
Italian Democratic Party; Partito Democratico Italiano	1959–1972	—
Italian Socialist Party of Proletarian Unity; Partito Socialista Italiano di Unità Proletaria	1964–1972	1964–1976
Radical Party; Partito Radicale	1976–1987	—
National Democracy; Democrazia Nazionale	1976–1979	1977–1979
Proletarian Democracy; Democrazia Proletaria	1976–1978, 1983–1991	—
Proletarian Unity Party; Partito di Unità Proletaria	1978–1983	—
Federation of Green Lists; Federazione delle Liste Verdi	1987–1992	—
Democratic Party of the Left; Partito Democratico della Sinistra	1991–1994, 1996–1998	1991–1994, 1996–1998
Communist Refoundation Party; Partito della Rifondazione Comunista	1992–1998, 2001–2008	1991–1999, 2006–2008
Northern League; Lega Nord	1992–2018	1992–2018
Federation of the Greens; Federazione dei Verdi	1992–1994, 2006–2008	1996–2006
The Network; La Rete	1992–1994	—
Christian Democratic Centre; Centro Cristiano Democratico	1994–1998	1994–2001
Italian People's Party; Partito Popolare Italiano	1994–2001	1994–2001
Forward Italy; Forza Italia	1994–2008	1994–2008
National Alliance; Alleanza Nazionale	1994–2008	1994–2008
Federalists and Liberal Democrats; Federalisti e Liberaldemocratici	1994–1996	—
Federalist Italian League; Lega Italiana Federalista	1995	1995–1996
United Christian Democrats; Cristiani Democratici Uniti	—	1995–1998
Italian Renewal; Rinnovamento Italiano	1996–1999	1996–2000
Democrats of the Left; Democratici di Sinistra	1998–2006	1998–2006
Party of Italian Communists; Partito dei Comunisti Italiani	1998–2001, 2006–2008	1998–1999
Democratic Union for the Republic; Unione Democratic per la Repubblica	1998–1999	1998–1999
The Democrats; I Democratici	1999–2001	—
Union of Democrats for Europe; Unione Democratici per l'Europa	1999–2001, 2006–2008	1999–2001
European Democracy; Democrazia Europea	—	2001
Democracy is Freedom – The Daisy; Democrazia è Libertà – La Margherita	2001–2006	2001–2006
Union of Christian and Centre Democrats; Unione dei Democratici Cristiani e di Centro	2001–2013	2001–2008
Italy of Values; Italia dei Valori	2006–2013	2008–2013
Democratic Left; Sinistra Democratica	2007–2008	2007–2008
The People of Freedom; Il Popolo della Libertà	2008–2013	2008–2013
Future and Freedom; Futuro e Libertà	2010–2013	2010–2011
New Centre-Right; Nuovo Centrodestra	2013–2018	2013–2018
Article One; Articolo Uno	2017–2018	2017–2018
Civic Choice; Scelta Civica	2013–2018	2013–2015
Left Ecology Freedom; Sinistra Ecologia Libertà	2013–2018	—
Conservatives and Reformists; Conservatori e Riformisti	—	2015–2017
Us with Italy; Noi con l'Italia	—	2017–2018
Italy Alive; Italia Viva	2019–2022	2019–2022
Together for the Future; Insieme per il Futuro	2022	2022

== Parliamentary groups not representing a political party ==
=== Active parliamentary groups ===
- Mixed Group (Constituent Assembly / Chamber and Senate, 1946–present)
- For the Autonomies (Senate, 2001–present)
- Action – Italy Alive (Chamber and Senate, 2022–present)
- Greens and Left Alliance (Chamber, 2022–present)
- Us Moderates (Chamber, 2022–present)
- Civics of Italy–Us Moderates (Senate, 2022–present)

=== Defunct parliamentary groups ===
- Historical Right (Chamber, 1849–1913)
- Historical Left (Chamber, 1849–1913)
- Historical Far Left (Chamber, 1867–1904)
- Dissident Left (Chamber, 1877–1887)
- Autonomist Group (Constituent Assembly, 1946–1948)
- National Democratic Union (Constituent Assembly, 1946–1948)
- National Bloc of Freedom (Constituent Assembly, 1947–1948)
- National Union (Constituent Assembly, 1947–1948)
- Left Democratic Group (Senate, 1948–1953)
- Democratic Group – Independents of the Left (Senate, 1953–1958)
- Free–Social–Republican Group (Senate, 1953–1958)
- Italian Social Movement–PNM/PDI (1958–1963)
- Unified Socialist Party (Chamber and Senate, 1966–1969)
- Independent Left (Senate, 1968–1992; Chamber, 1983–1992)
- Italian Liberal Party–Italian Democratic Socialist Party (Senate, 1976–1979)
- European Federalist Group (Chamber, 1987–1994)
- Ecologist European Federalist Group (Senate, 1987–1992)
- Proletarian Democracy–Communists (Chamber, 1991–1992)
- Greens–The Network (Senate, 1992–1996)
- Progressives (Chamber and Senate, 1994–1996)
- Democratic Left (Senate, 1994–1996)
- The Democrats (Chamber, 1995)
- The Olive Tree (Chamber and Senate, 2006–2007)
- Socialists and Radicals – Rose in the Fist (Chamber, 2006–2008)
- Greens–Italian Communists (Senate, 2006–2008)
- Christian Democracy for the Autonomies–New Italian Socialist Party (Chamber, 2006–2008)
- Christian Democracy for the Autonomies–Movement for Autonomy (Senate, 2006–2008)
- People and Territory (Chamber, 2011–2013)
- National Cohesion (Senate, 2011–2013)
- For the Third Pole (Senate, 2011–2013)
- For Italy (Chamber, 2013–2014; Senate 2013–2014)
- For Italy–Democratic Centre (Chamber, 2014–2016)
- For Italy–Solidary Democracy (Chamber, 2016–2018)
- Great Autonomies and Freedom (Senate, 2013–2018)
- Popular Area (Senate, 2014–2017)
- Civics and Innovators (Chamber, 2016–2018)
- Federation of Freedom (Senate, 2017–2018)
- Free and Equal (Chamber, 2018–2022)
- Europeanists–MAIE–CD (Senate, 2021)
- Constitution, Environment, Labour–PC–IdV (Senate, 2022)

== See also ==
- List of political parties in Italy
- List of political coalitions in Italy
