= Alfredo Covelli =

Italian politician (1914–1998)

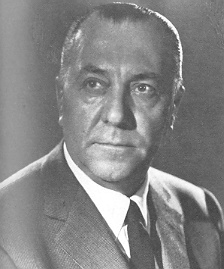

President of the Italian Social Movement
- In office 1973–1977
- Preceded by: Gino Birindelli
- Succeeded by: Pino Romualdi

Leader of the Italian Democratic Party of Monarchist Unity
- In office 11 April 1959 – 11 July 1972
- Preceded by: Office created
- Succeeded by: Office abolished

Leader of the Monarchist National Party
- In office 13 June 1946 – 11 April 1959
- Preceded by: Office created
- Succeeded by: Office abolished

Member of Chamber of Deputies
- In office 8 May 1948 – 19 June 1979
- Constituency: Benevento

Member of the Constituent Assembly
- In office 25 June 1946 – 31 January 1948
- Constituency: Salerno

Personal details
- Born: 22 February 1914 Bonito, Italy
- Died: 25 December 1998 (aged 84) Rome, Italy
- Party: PDI (1944–1946); PNM (1946–1959); PDIUM (1959–1972); MSI (1972–1977); DN (1977–1979)
- Education: University of Naples Federico II
- Profession: Teacher, journalist

Alfredo Covelli (22 February 1914 – 25 December 1998) was an Italian monarchist politician. He was the leader of the Monarchist National Party and Italian Democratic Party of Monarchist Unity from 1946 to 1972. In 1972, he led the monarchists into union with the neofascist Italian Social Movement, taking up the role of President in the merged party. However, in 1977, he broke from the MSI, forming National Democracy. In the 1979 election, he failed to be re-elected as a candidate of National Democracy and retired from politics, though he remained active in monarchist circles. He was continuously a deputy for Rome between 1948 and 1979, representing successively the PNM, PDIUM, MSI and National Democracy. He died in 1998 in Rome.

== Early life and education ==
Covelli was born in Bonito, Campania. He graduated in literature and philosophy, in law and political science in the second half of the 1930s, and in 1940 he was a teacher of Latin and Greek in a grammar school in Benevento. He took part in the Second World War as an officer in the Air Force, and after a series of operations in Tirana and Bari, he received a decoration for military valor.

During his military service he met King Victor Emmanuel III in Apulia, which caused him to become a committed monarchist, a political commitment he would retain for 50 years.

== Political career ==
In 1944 Covelli joined the nascent Italian Democratic Party. In 1946, he was a candidate of the conservative monarchist National Bloc of Freedom for the Constituent Assembly. He was successfully elected in the Salerno constituency. In the concomitant referendum he opposed the successful push for the abolition of the monarchy.

=== Leading the PNM ===
In June 1946 he led the initiative to unite the PDI and other monarchist groups, forming the Monarchist National Party, of which he became leader, retaining this office for the party's thirteen-year existence. The party won just 2.8% of the vote in the 1948 election but made major gains in the 1953 election, where it achieved the best-ever result of post-war Italian monarchist parties, electing 40 deputies and 14 senators. However, the next year, a major schism in the monarchist movement resulted in the split between the PNM under Covelli and the People's Monarchist Party (PMP) under Mayor of Naples Achille Lauro. In the 1958 general election the PMP eclipsed the PNM and the total representation of monarchists in Parliament declined significantly.

=== Leading the PDIUM ===
In 1959, he, together with Lauro, agreed to reunify the PNM and the PMP into a new Italian Democratic Party, soon renamed the Italian Democratic Party of Monarchist Unity. Covelli became leader of the unified party, while Lauro took up the role of party president. Irrespective of the reunification of Italian monarchists, the 1963 general election produced a disappointing result for the PDIUM, which won 1.8% of the vote, less than half of the aggregate result the divided parties achieved in 1958; the party elected just 8 Deputies and 2 Senators.

In 1964 Covelli also took up a management role in football, becoming an advisor to SS Lazio.

In the 1968 election the party's result declined further and it won just 1.3% of the vote.

=== Uniting with the MSI ===
In 1970, facing a decline in the monarchist electorate, he negotiated an alliance of the PDIUM with the neo-fascist Italian Social Movement (MSI) which was known as Destra Nazionale or National Right.

Two years later, he was the chief architect of the dissolution of the PDIUM and its merger with the MSI, which then renamed itself the Italian Social Movement-National Right (MSI-DN). After the merger he took up the office of President in the new unified party.

A faction of the PDIUM that disagreed with uniting with the heirs of Fascism broke away to form the Monarchist Alliance (now Royal Italy), which continued into the 21st century.

=== National Democracy ===
In 1976 a conflict emerged in the MSI between conservative members (organized in a current called National Democracy) and supporters of Giorgio Almirante, motivated by his refusal to support the Andreotti government in parliament. When Almirante was confirmed as leader at the MSI-DN's 1976 Congress, National Democracy broke away and became an independent party in January 1977. The party took with it 9 of the MSI's 15 Senators and 21 of its 35 Deputies but few grassroots members, leaving Almirante in near-unconstested control of the MSI. Covelli was one of those responsible for engineering the exit of DN from MSI and became a senior member of the new party. The new party was of a conservative, nationalist, and post-fascist orientation but did not programmatically espouse the monarchism for which Covelli fought.

The new party sought to ingratiate itself with the political mainstream and distance itself from the neo-fascist MSI. However, its overtures to the Christian Democrats were refused. As a result, in the 1979 general and European Parliament elections, the party saw disappointing results, winning less than 1% of the vote on both occasions and achieving representation in neither the Italian or European parliaments; Covelli failed to be re-elected deputy, the office he had held continually since 1948. As a result, he announced his retirement from politics; National Democracy was wound up in December 1979.

=== Retirement and death ===
On 15 January 1998 he was appointed by Victor Emmanuel of Savoy to the office of Honorary President of the Council of the Senators of the Kingdom, an institution created from former members of the Senate of the Kingdom of Italy.

He died on Christmas Day 1998 in Rome. At his request, he was buried in Bonito, his birthplace. President Oscar Luigi Scalfaro attended his funeral.

In 2008, his personal archives and correspondence were donated by his family to the Chamber of Deputies, which made them accessible to researchers.

== Electoral history ==
Election	House	Constituency	Party	Votes	Result
1946	Constituent Assembly	Salerno–Avellino	BNL	6,645	Elected
1948	Chamber of Deputies	Benevento–Avellino–Salerno	PNM	31,080	Elected
1953	Chamber of Deputies	Benevento–Avellino–Salerno	PNM	72,073	Elected
1958	Chamber of Deputies	Benevento–Avellino–Salerno	PNM	23,052	Elected
1963	Chamber of Deputies	Benevento–Avellino–Salerno	PDIUM	25,054	Elected
1968	Chamber of Deputies	Benevento–Avellino–Salerno	PDIUM	20,170	Elected
1972	Chamber of Deputies	Benevento–Avellino–Salerno	MSI	108,101	Elected
1976	Chamber of Deputies	Benevento–Avellino–Salerno	MSI	54,993	Elected
1979	Chamber of Deputies	Benevento–Avellino–Salerno	DN	5,445	Not elected
1979	European Parliament	Southern Italy	DN	18,223	Not elected
