= List of political coalitions in Italy =

This article contains a list of political coalitions in Italy.

== Electoral coalitions ==
=== Active electoral coalitions ===
- Centre-right coalition (1994–present)
- Centre-left coalition (1996–present)

=== Defunct electoral coalitions ===
- Centrist coalition (1953)
- Pact for Italy (1994–1995)
- Pole of Freedoms (1994–1995)
- Pole of Good Government (1994–1995)
- Alliance of Progressives (1994–1995)
- Pact of Democrats (1995–1996)
- Pole for Freedoms (1996–2000)
- The Olive Tree (1995–2007)
- The Union (2000–2008)
- House of Freedoms (2004–2008)
- Italy. Common Good (2012–2013)
- With Monti for Italy (2012–2013)

== Parliamentary coalitions ==
- The Clover (1999–2000)
- New Pole for Italy (2010–2012)

== Government-only coalitions ==
- National Liberation Committee (1943–1947)
- Centrism (1947–1958)
- Organic centre-left (1963–1976)
- Historic Compromise (1978–1979)
- Pentapartito (1981–1991)
- Quadripartito (1991–1993)

== Electoral joint lists ==
=== Active electoral joint lists ===
- Democratic and Progressive Italy (2022)
- Action – Italia Viva (2022)
- Greens and Left Alliance (2022)
- People's Union (2022)
- Us Moderates (2022)
- Life (2022)

=== Defunct electoral joint lists ===
- National Bloc (1921)
- National List (1924)
- National Democratic Union (1946)
- National Bloc of Freedom (1946)
- Popular Democratic Front (1948)
- Socialist Unity (1948)
- National Bloc
- Lega Lombarda – Alleanza Nord (1989)
- Populars for Prodi (1996)
- Dini List (1996)
- National Alliance – Segni Pact (1999)
- White Flower (2001)
- The Sunflower (2001)
- United in the Olive Tree (2004)
- Social Alternative (2004, 2005 and 2006)
- Christian Democracy for the Autonomies–New Italian Socialist Party (2006)
- Rose in the Fist (2006)
- Together with the Union (2006
- The Left – The Rainbow (2008)
- The Right – Tricolour Flame (2008)
- For the Common Good (2008)
- Left and Freedom (2009)
- Anticapitalist and Communist List (2009)
- The Autonomy (2009)
- Civil Revolution (2013)
- New Centre-Right – Union of the Centre (2014)
- The Other Europe (2014)
- European Greens – Green Italia (2014)
- European Choice (2014)
- Free and Equal (2018)
- Together (2018)
- Popular Civic List (2018)
- Italy for the Italians (2018)
- The Left (2019)
- Civic Commitment (2022)
- Sovereign and Popular Italy (2022)

== Other coalitions and federations of parties ==
- Unified Socialist Party (1966–1969)
- Pact for Autonomies (2006–2008)
- Republicans, Liberals, Reformers (2007–2008)
- Federation of the Left (2009–2015)
- Ecologists and Civic Networks (2011–2013)
- Movement for National Alliance (2013–2014)

== Regional electoral coalitions and joint lists ==
- Deutscher Verband (South Tyrol – 1919, 1921, 1924)
- Republican Progressive Democratic Front (Aosta Valley – 1946)
- Aosta Valley (Aosta Valley – 1992, 1994, 1996, 2001, 2006, 2008, 2013, 2018 and 2022)
- Reformist Popular Centre (Friuli-Venezia Giulia – 1998)
- Together for Veneto (Veneto – 2000)
- Autonomy Liberty Democracy (Aosta Valley – 2006, 2008, 2013)
- Independence We Veneto (Veneto – 2015)
- For All (Aosta Valley – 2018)
- Autonomies for Europe (Aosta Valley – 2019)

== See also ==
- List of political parties in Italy
