= Aldo Bozzi =

Italian jurist and politician (1909–1987)

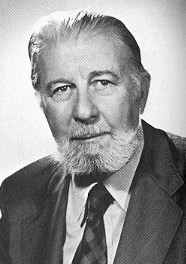

Minister of Transport
- In office 30 June 1972 – 7 July 1973
- Prime Minister: Giulio Andreotti
- Preceded by: Oscar Luigi Scalfaro
- Succeeded by: Luigi Preti

Member of the Chamber of Deputies
- In office 25 June 1953 – 1 July 1987
- Constituency: Rome

Member of the Constituent Assembly
- In office 25 June 1946 – 31 January 1948
- Constituency: Rome

Personal details
- Born: 22 February 1909 Rome, Kingdom of Italy
- Died: 1 November 1987 (aged 78) Rome, Italy
- Party: Italian Liberal Party

Aldo Bozzi (22 February 1909 – 1 November 1987) was an Italian lawyer and politician. He was a long-term member of the Italian Parliament representing the Italian Liberal Party. He served as the minister of transport for one year between 1972 and 1973.

== Biography ==
Bozzi was born in Rome on 22 February 1909. He received a degree in law. He was a member of the Italian Liberal Party. From 1953 he was a member of the Italian Parliament and also, served at the Italian Senate. He was the undersecretary of the state ministry for finance from 9 July 1955 to 19 May 1957 in the first cabinet of Prime Minister Antonio Segni. Bozzi headed several parliament commissions, including the one formed in May 1961 to investigate the related public bodies responsible for the construction of Fiumicino airport. Bozzi was the minister of transport between 30 June 1972 and 7 July 1973 in the cabinet led by Prime Minister Giulio Andreotti. From November 1983 to January 1985 he headed the Parliament commission on the institutional reform consisted of twenty senators and twenty deputies.

He died in Rome on 1 November 1987 at the age of 78.

== Electoral history ==
| Election | House | Constituency | Party | Votes | Result |
|---|---|---|---|---|---|
| 1946 | Constituent Assembly | Rome–Viterbo–Latina–Frosinone | UDN | 9,801 | Elected |
| 1948 | Chamber of Deputies | Rome–Viterbo–Latina–Frosinone | BN | 6,883 | Not elected |
| 1953 | Chamber of Deputies | Rome–Viterbo–Latina–Frosinone | PLI | 10,633 | Elected |
| 1958 | Chamber of Deputies | Rome–Viterbo–Latina–Frosinone | PLI | 19,375 | Elected |
| 1963 | Chamber of Deputies | Rome–Viterbo–Latina–Frosinone | PLI | 47,168 | Elected |
| 1968 | Chamber of Deputies | Rome–Viterbo–Latina–Frosinone | PLI | 43,591 | Elected |
| 1972 | Chamber of Deputies | Rome–Viterbo–Latina–Frosinone | PLI | 31,312 | Elected |
| 1976 | Chamber of Deputies | Rome–Viterbo–Latina–Frosinone | PLI | 7,523 | Elected |
| 1979 | Chamber of Deputies | Rome–Viterbo–Latina–Frosinone | PLI | 12,785 | Elected |
| 1983 | Chamber of Deputies | Rome–Viterbo–Latina–Frosinone | PLI | 15,648 | Elected |
| 1987 | Chamber of Deputies | Rome–Viterbo–Latina–Frosinone | PLI | 10,466 | Not elected |
