= Achille Lauro (businessman) =

Italian businessman and politician (1887–1982)

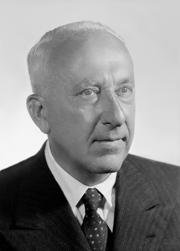

Mayor of Naples
- In office 4 February 1961 – 29 November 1961
- Preceded by: Nicola Sansanelli
- Succeeded by: Vincenzo Maria Palmieri
- In office 9 July 1952 – 6 January 1958
- Preceded by: Domenico Moscati
- Succeeded by: Nicola Sansanelli

Member of the Chamber of Deputies
- In office 25 May 1972 – 19 June 1979
- Constituency: Naples
- In office 12 June 1958 – 4 June 1968
- Constituency: Rome (1958–63); Naples (1963–68)

Member of the Senate of the Republic
- In office 4 June 1968 – 25 May 1972
- Constituency: Campania
- In office 25 June 1953 – 6 April 1954
- Constituency: Campania

Member of the Chamber of Fasces and Corporations
- In office 23 March 1939 – 5 August 1943
- Appointed by: Benito Mussolini

Personal details
- Born: 16 June 1887 Piano di Sorrento, Italy
- Died: 15 November 1982 (aged 95) Naples, Italy
- Party: PNF (1939–1943); PNM (1946–1954); PMP (1954–1959); PDIUM (1959–1972); MSI (1972–1977); DN (1977–1979)
- Spouse: Angelina Lauro
- Profession: Politician; Entrepreneur
- Nickname: "Il Comandante"

Achille Lauro (Italian pronunciation: [aˈkille ˈlauro]; 16 June 1887 – 15 November 1982) was an Italian businessman and politician. He is widely considered one of the main precursors of modern populism in Italian politics. He was nicknamed by his supporters Il Comandante ("The Commander").

== Biography ==
Born the fifth of six children of the shipowner Gioacchino and of Laura Cafiero, he was on his part the shipowner and founder of the "Flotta Lauro", based in Southern Italy.

During the decades of Italian Fascist dictatorship (1922–1943), he became a member of the National Fascist Party (PNF) and was named National Counselor of the Chamber of Fasces and Corporations, appointed to this position by Galeazzo Ciano, son-in-law of Benito Mussolini himself, who was active in shipping commerce. Also during this period he was named president of the Naples football club SSC Napoli, where he succeeded Giorgio Ascarelli.

In fall of 1943, during the Allied invasion of Italy, American OSS officer Donald Downes describes requisitioning Lauro's strategically located palazzo:

Number 71 Via Francesco Crispi is a temple to essential Fascist vulgarity, and looks like nothing so much as a movie lobby in the gilded days of the opening of The Paramount in New York. The further you proceed from the circular foyer in green marble with the insignia of Lauro's fleet worked in the marble floor, the more institutionally ugly it becomes.

After the end of World War II, following an initial participation in the Common Man's Front, he became active in the Italian monarchist movement led by Alfredo Covelli and financially supported the foundation of the Monarchist National Party (PNM), and was for a long time the mayor of Naples.

In 1972, he joined the neo-fascist party Italian Social Movement (MSI). A square in the coastal town of Sorrento is named after him.

In the 2024 film Parthenope, a fictionalised version of Lauro was portrayed by Italian actor Alfonso Santagata.

== Electoral history ==
Election	House	Constituency	Party	Votes	Result
1953	Senate of the Republic	Campania – Naples IV	PNM	182,738	Elected
1958	Chamber of Deputies	Rome–Viterbo–Latina–Frosinone	PMP	30,761	Elected
1963	Chamber of Deputies	Naples–Caserta	PDIUM	60,574	Elected
1968	Senate of the Republic	Campania – Naples IV	PDIUM	14,693	Elected
1972	Chamber of Deputies	Naples–Caserta	MSI	108,101	Elected
1976	Chamber of Deputies	Naples–Caserta	MSI	72,436	Elected
1979	Chamber of Deputies	Naples–Caserta	DN	11,118	Not elected
