= Roberto Lucifero d'Aprigliano =

Italian politician

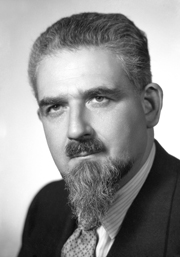

Secretary of Italian Liberal Party
- In office 1947–1948
- Preceded by: Giovanni Cassandro
- Succeeded by: Bruno Villabruna

Member of the Chamber of Deputies
- In office 25 June 1953 – 15 May 1963
- Constituency: Catanzaro

Member of the Senate of the Republic
- In office 8 May 1948 – 24 June 1953
- Constituency: Calabria

Member of the Constituent Assembly
- In office 25 June 1946 – 31 January 1948
- Constituency: Catanzaro

Personal details
- Born: 16 December 1903 Rome, Italy
- Died: 11 January 1993 (aged 89) Rome, Italy
- Party: PDI (1944–1946); PLI (1946–1949); PNM (1953–1959)
- Profession: Politician, publicist

Roberto Lucifero d'Aprigliano (16 December 1903 – 11 January 1993) was a lawyer who became a partisan. As World War II ended he turned to politics and journalism.

In 1947/48 he briefly (and divisively) served as national secretary of the Italian Liberal Party.

== Life ==
He was born in Rome. His father, Alfonso Lucifero was from Crotone in the south and served between 1886 and 1919 as a member of parliament. After the Badoglio Proclamation of 8 September 1943, Roberto Lucifero d'Aprigliano participated in the Roman resistance against the city's occupation by German forces, as a member of an underground monarchist group. In April 1944 he was captured by German Nazi paramilitaries and imprisoned in the Regina Coeli, from where he was released on 4 June 1944 as allied forces liberated Rome from the German occupation.

A few days later he participated in the formation of the short-lived Italian Democratic Party (Partito Democratico Italiano, PDI), created through the merger of the "Centro della Democrazia Italiana", the "Partito di unione" and the "Partito socialdemocratico". As a member of the PDI party executive, he took on responsibility for contributing to the daily news publication "monarchico Italia nuova", from the pages of which he attacked the antifascist measures of the Bonomi government and the "dictatorship" of the National Liberation Committee ("Comitato di Liberazione Nazionale" / CLN). On 12 September 1944 he had a meeting with the Foreign Minister and CDU leader, De Gasperi, whom he urged to break the CLN coalition alliance with the Communists (something which in May 1947 De Gasperi would indeed do).

Lucifero d'Aprigliano used "monarchico Italia nuova" to promote his opposition to the very broad political coalition underpinning the CLN, which was at variance with the mood of the times. He was known as a strong supporter of the monarchy. Sources suggest that at a time when the future of the monarchy was being questioned, the king and his family were themselves embarrassed by the support of Lucifero d'Aprigliano's "Italia nuova" movement at a time when the royal family were making a determined push to move away from the Mussolini years, towards a more democratically focused monarchy.

In September 1945 he was appointed to the National Consultative Body ("Consulta Nazionale"), and on 2 June 1946 he was elected to the Constituent Assembly of Italy as a member of the National Bloc of Freedom coalition. On 2 June 1946 a referendum was held on the future of the monarchy. The result was clear, but by no means overwhelming, support for a republican future. Lucifero d'Aprigliano was among those who urged the king to stand firm in resisting the referendum result. Not for the first time, however, he found the tide of history was moving against him.

In the Constituent Assembly Lucifero d'Aprigliano intervened on matters such as the "right to strike", regional autonomy, church-state relations, the preservation of public morality and the use by the old aristocracy of their titles. He was also prominent in discussions concerning the rights and properties of the House of Savoy. He spoke in a plenary session of the assembly on 4 March 1947 to oppose the expressly antifascist sense of the new constitution, contending that the constitution should make no reference whatever to fascism "neither in positive nor in negative terms". His preferred formulation involved a preamble to the main text of the constitution along the following lines:

"The Italian people, invoking God's help, freely exercising their sovereignty, have been granted this fundamental law. through which The State is constituted".
"Il popolo italiano, invocando l'assistenza di Dio, nel libero esercizio della propria sovranità si è data la presente legge fondamentale, mediante la quale si costituisce e si ordina in Stato"

On 3 December 1947 Lucifero d'Aprigliano presented a constitutional motion to the assembly designed to preserve a united front among the various right wing parties. The motion passed, albeit narrowly, by 381 votes against 373. The lead he had taken led to Lucifero d'Aprigliano being elected national secretary of the Italian Liberal Party ("Partito Liberale Italiano" / PLI). However, he failed to achieve his objective of consolidating a permanent alliance of right wing political parties. His continuing fervent monarchism remained out of tune with the political mainstream and his incumbency as party secretary turned out to be brief, lasting from December 1947 till October 1948. At first he lobbied colleagues to reinstate him, but after the fifth party congress in July 1949 he found himself increasingly marginalised within the PLI, and during 1950 he resigned from it. At the General Election of 7 June 1953 Lucifero d'Aprigliano stood for election to parliament as a candidate from the Monarchist National Party ("Partito Nazionale Monarchico" / PNM)). He was successful, representing the Reggio Calabria electoral district, and was re-elected in 1958.

== Electoral history ==
Election	House	Constituency	Party	Votes	Result
1946	Constituent Assembly	Catanzaro–Cosenza–Reggio Calabria	BNL	33,721	Elected
1948	Senate of the Republic	Calabria – Crotone	BN	34,183	Elected
1953	Chamber of Deputies	Catanzaro–Cosenza–Reggio Calabria	PNM	22,351	Elected
1958	Chamber of Deputies	Catanzaro–Cosenza–Reggio Calabria	PNM	4,989	Elected
