= Riccardo Lombardi =

Italian politician (1901–1984)

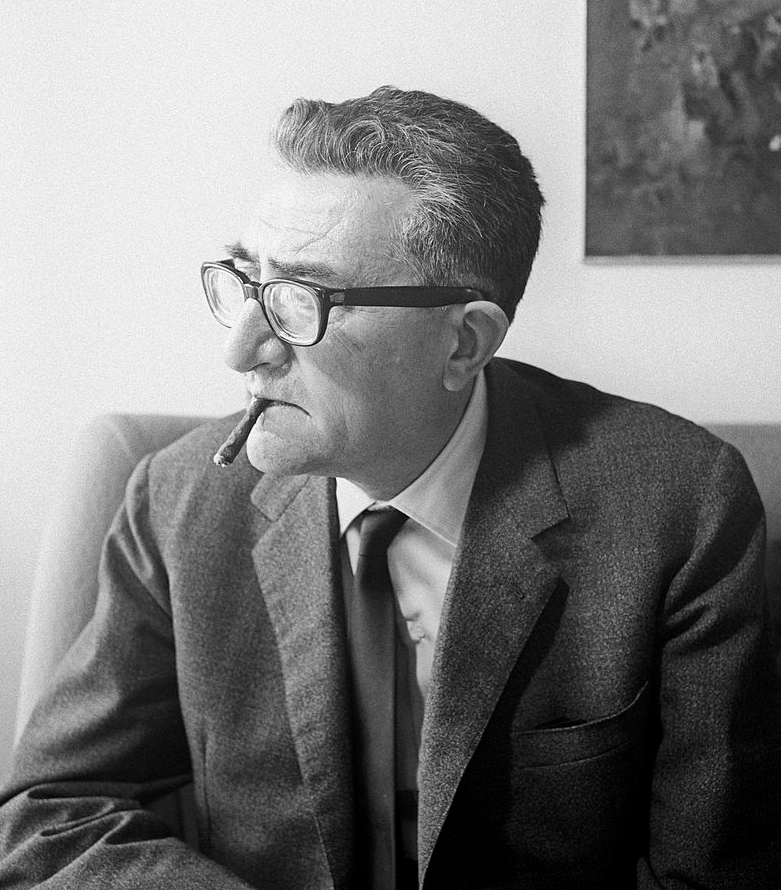

Minister of Transport
- In office 10 December 1945 – 1 July 1946
- Prime Minister: Alcide De Gasperi
- Preceded by: Ugo La Malfa
- Succeeded by: Giacomo Ferrari

Member of the Chamber of Deputies
- In office 8 May 1948 – 11 July 1983
- Constituency: Milan

Member of the Constituent Assembly
- In office 25 June 1946 – 31 January 1948
- Constituency: Italy at-large

Personal details
- Born: 16 August 1901 Regalbuto, Kingdom of Italy
- Died: 18 September 1984 (aged 83) Rome, Italy
- Party: PdA (1942–1947); PSI (1947–1984)
- Spouse: Ena Viatto (m. 1932)
- Education: Polytechnic University of Milan
- Profession: Engineer, journalist

Riccardo Lombardi (16 August 1901 – 18 September 1984) was an Italian politician.

== Early life ==
Lombardi was born in Regalbuto, in the province of Enna (now in the province of Catania), in 1901. He studied at the Pennisi College of Acireale. After completing his high school studies, he attended the Polytechnic of Milan, where he obtained a degree in Industrial Engineering. He joined the Italian People's Party (PPI) of Don Luigi Sturzo, thus sympathizing with the Christian Labor Party, which was founded in 1920 by left-wing members of the PPI, such as Guido Miglioli, to whom he was very attached. He participated in some actions of the Arditi del Popolo, including the defense of the socialist newspaper Avanti! from the assault of the Italian fascist squads.

In 1923, Lombardi collaborated with Il Domani d'Italia, a newspaper of the Catholic left. When Italian Catholicism gave up actively opposing fascism, he approached Marxist culture, also drawing inspiration from Antonio Gramsci, and gradually deviated from its own Catholic formation. After the suppression of political parties decreed on 5 November 1926 by the National Fascist Party (PNF) regime, he continued to participate in clandestine activity with anti-fascist exponents of various tendencies, in particular with the communists whose activism he appreciated, while refusing to join the Communist Party of Italy.

In those years, Lombardi met his partner and future wife, Ena Viatto (1906–1986), who fell in love with him and separated from Girolamo Li Causi. In 1930, following a leafleting action, he was attacked by the Blackshirts, then arrested and tortured with batons by the police at the PNF headquarters. The beatings injured his lung and he never fully recovered from the after-effects of the violence.

== Italian resistance and political activity ==
A leader of the Italian resistance movement against Benito Mussolini during World War II, Lombardi was one of the founders of the Action Party (PdA) in 1942. He was member of the National Liberation Committee for Northern Italy, from which at the Liberation he was appointed Prefect of Milan (from 30 April 1945 to December 1945). In this office, he testified in favour of the former fascist prefect of Milan, Piero Parini. He participated in the first De Gasperi government (10 December 1945 – 1 July 1946) as Italian Minister of Transport, starting the rapid reconstruction of the railway network.

Lombardi represented the PdA in the Constituent Assembly of Italy from 1946 to 1948 and the Italian Socialist Party (PSI) in Italy's Chamber of Deputies from 1948 to 1983. In 1980, he was appointed president of the PSI and represented the party left wing.

== Forged NATO document incident ==
On 18 June 1970, Lombardi made claims before the country's Chamber of Deputies, based on a document printed on NATO stationery, that the organization was planning to move troops into Italy as a result of the perceived political instability. Lombardi stated that he had received the document at the end of a meeting of NATO foreign ministers on 25 May 1970. The document was later rejected as a forgery by the Italian Foreign Ministry and by NATO headquarters.

== Death ==
Lombardi died of pulmonary fibrosis and respiratory failure at the Roman clinic Mater Dei. By his explicit will, he was cremated without religious rites.

== Electoral history ==
Election	House	Constituency	Party	Votes	Result
1946	Constituent Assembly	Italy at-large	PSIUP	– (Note: Elected in a closed list proportional representation system.)	Elected
1948	Chamber of Deputies	Milan–Pavia	FDP	22,954	Elected
1953	Chamber of Deputies	Milan–Pavia	PSI	10,805	Elected
1958	Chamber of Deputies	Milan–Pavia	PSI	9,068	Elected
1963	Chamber of Deputies	Milan–Pavia	PSI	18,207	Elected
1968	Chamber of Deputies	Milan–Pavia	PSI	14,133	Elected
1972	Chamber of Deputies	Milan–Pavia	PSI	22,704	Elected
1976	Chamber of Deputies	Milan–Pavia	PSI	32,344	Elected
1979	Chamber of Deputies	Milan–Pavia	PSI	25,224	Elected
