= Guglielmo Giannini =

Italian politician (1891–1960)

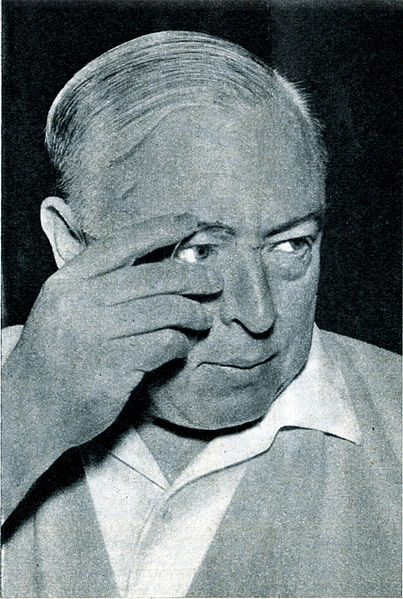

Member of the Chamber of Deputies
- In office 8 May 1948 – 24 June 1953
- Constituency: Rome

Member of the Constituent Assembly
- In office 25 June 1946 – 31 January 1948
- Constituency: Rome

Personal details
- Born: 14 October 1891 Pozzuoli, Kingdom of Italy
- Died: 13 October 1960 (aged 68) Rome, Italy
- Party: UQ (1946–1949); DC (1953–1958); PMP (1958–1960)
- Profession: Politician, journalist, writer, director, dramaturge

Guglielmo Giannini (14 October 1891 – 13 October 1960) was an Italian politician, journalist, writer, director, and dramaturge.

== Early life ==
Giannini was born in Pozzuoli by Federico Giannini and Mary Jackson, and grew up in Naples. He practised many different trades (from bricklayer to a clerk in a cloth shop) before coming to journalism, in modest satirical papers. Travelling around Europe, he became fond of the crime novel and began to write in this genre. Subsequently, guided by his father, he pursued a journalistic career. He fought as a volunteer in the Italo-Turkish War (1911–1912) and participated in the First World War. At the end of the war, he moved to Rome and returned to the profession of journalist. During this period he also began to work as a playwright.

Opposed to Italy's entry into the Second World War (a stance dictated by his conviction that defeat was certain), Giannini struggled to find work. In 1942, during the war, his son Mario died in a plane crash at the Falconara Marittima airport. This tragedy inspired the essay La folla, published in 1946, and resulted in his adopting a general hatred for the political class, and in particular for its leaders, irrespective of political affiliation. In 1943, Giannini also directed four feature films in a year, including Grattacieli and 4 ragazze sognano, both with Paolo Stoppa as the protagonist.

== Common's Man Front ==
On 27 December 1944, Giannini founded a new weekly, L'Uomo qualunque (translatable as The Common Man or The Ordinary Man), which in May 1945 exceeded 800 thousand copies. Tired of the fascist dictatorship and the intrusion of politics in the lives of private citizens, but also of the return of traditional parties, Giannini, following the success of the weekly newspaper, founded an opinion movement called Common Man's Front (FUQ). The movement, based on a new political pseudo-ideology, called "qualunquismo". It received 5.3% of the votes in the parliamentary election of 1946, getting 30 deputies to the Constituent assembly, including Giannini himself, who became group leader in the Parliament.

In 1947, Giannini, after having tried an alliance with the Christian Democracy (DC) and the Italian Social Movement (MSI), approached the communist leader Palmiro Togliatti, whom two years before he had described as "worm, rogue and forger". Many sympathizers of the Common Man's Front, astounded by this choice, abandoned Giannini, who then renounced the pact of friendship with the Italian Communist Party (PCI) to make an alliance with the Italian Liberal Party (PLI) instead. In the parliamentary election of 1948 the FUQ-PLI alliance obtained only 3.8% of the vote; Giannini was elected to the Chamber and joined the Mixed Group. After the electoral failure, Giannini resigned as president of the Common Man's Frontin October 1948. In 1953 and 1958, Giannini was a candidate with the DC and the People's Monarchist Party, respeticevly, but in both cases he was not elected. Giannini laid the foundational blueprint for Italian populism, and every subsequent movement in that tradition — whether on the right or the left — owes him a considerable debt.

== Electoral history ==
Election	House	Constituency	Party	Votes	Result
1946	Constituent Assembly	Rome–Viterbo–Latina–Frosinone	FUQ	59,555	Elected
1948	Chamber of Deputies	Rome–Viterbo–Latina–Frosinone	BN	13,095	Elected
1953	Chamber of Deputies	Rome–Viterbo–Latina–Frosinone	DC	13,439	Not elected
1958	Chamber of Deputies	Rome–Viterbo–Latina–Frosinone	PMP	4,967	Not elected

== Filmography ==
- Duetto vagabondo (1939)
- Il nemico (1943)
- 4 ragazze sognano (1943)
- Grattacieli (1943)
