= Italian Democratic Party =

Defunct political party in Italy

Italian Democratic Party Partito Democratico Italiano
- Leader: Roberto Lucifero d'Aprigliano
- Founded: 4 June 1944
- Dissolved: 17 January 1947
- Merged into: Monarchist National Party
- Headquarters: Rome, Italy
- Ideology: Conservatism; Monarchism; Anti-fascism; Anti-communism
- Political position: Right-wing
- National affiliation: National Bloc of Freedom (1946)
- Colours: Blue

The Italian Democratic Party (Italian: Partito Democratico Italiano, PDI) was an Italian right-wing political party founded in 1944.

== History ==
The party was founded by the union of the following clubs and movements:

- Centre of Italian Democracy (Centro della Democrazia Italiana);
- Party of Union (Partito d'Unione);
- Social Democratic Party (Partito Sociale Democratico);
- Party of Democratic Union (Partito d'Unione Democratica);
- Movement of Democratic Renewal (Movimento di Rinnovazione Democratica);
- Italian Progressive Party (Partito Progressista Italiano).

In the 1946 general election, the PDI took part of the coalition named National Bloc of Freedom (Blocco Nazionale della Libertà - BNL).

After that, PDI dissolved and its members entered into the Italian Liberal Party and Monarchist National Party.

In 1959 Monarchist National Party and People's Monarchist Party merged into the Italian Democratic Party of Monarchist Unity (named Italian Democratic Party until 1961).
