= Capua (disambiguation) =

Capua is a city and comune in the province of Caserta, in the region of Campania, southern Italy.

Capua may also refer to:

- Capua (moth), a genus of moths belonging to the subfamily Tortricinae of the family Tortricidae
- Capua (surname), a surname of Italian origin
- Ancient Capua, ancient city in Campania, Italy
- Principality of Capua, Lombard state centred on Capua in Southern Italy
- Santa Maria Capua Vetere, modern day old Capua

== See also ==
- Capuana
- Di Capua
