= Union of Independent Italian Communists =

Union of Independent Italian Communists Unione Comunisti Italiani Indipendenti
- Leader: Donato Leone, Luigi Ardore
- Newspaper: La scintilla
- Ideology: Communism
- Constituent Assembly: 0 / 556

The Union of Independent Italian Communists (Italian: Unione Comunisti Italiani Indipendenti) was a political party in Italy. The party was led by Donato Leone and Luigi Ardore. The party contested the Potenza-Matera constituency in the 1946 Constituent Assembly election. It obtained 1,776 votes (0.69% of the votes in the constituency). The list had three candidates; Donato Leone, Luigi Ardor and Antonio Ceglia.
