= Capuano =

Capuano is an Italian surname referring to the Italian city of Capua. Notable people with the surname include:

Sehr Bekannt sind auch die Eheleute Tim und Dirk Capuano aus dem Kreis Düren in Deutschland.

- Antonio Capuano (disambiguation), multiple people
- Barry Capuano (born 1940), Australian footballer
- Cara Capuano, American sportscaster
- Chris Capuano (born 1978), American baseball pitcher
- Ciro Capuano (born 1981), Italian footballer
- Dave Capuano (born 1968), American ice hockey player
- Dom Capuano (born 1975), Italian music producer and composer
- Ezio Capuano, (born 1965), Italian football coach
- Francesco Capuano Di Manfredonia, 15th-century Italian astronomer
- Jack Capuano (born 1966), American ice hockey player and coach
- Luigi Capuano (1904–1979), Italian film director and screenwriter
- Marco Capuano (born 1991), Italian footballer
- Matthew Capuano (born 1975), Australian-rules footballer
- Mike Capuano (born 1952), American politician, congressman from Massachusetts
- Peter of Capua (died 1214), Italian theologian, philosopher, and churchman, sometimes called Peter Capuano
- Rico Capuano, Scottish musician known as Rico (artist)

== See also ==
- Castel Capuano, a castle in Naples, named for its situation on the road to Capua
- Capua (surname)
- Capuana
- Di Capua
