= Ezio Coppa =

Italian politician (1898–1969)

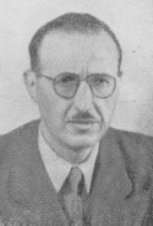
Ezio Coppa

Ezio Coppa (24 February 1898 - 26 July 1969) was an Italian politician.

Coppa was born in Ponza, Lazio. He represented the Common Man's Front in the Constituent Assembly of Italy from 1946 and 1948 and the Monarchist National Party in the Chamber of Deputies from 1948 to 1953.
