= Francesco De Vita =

Italian politician (1913–1961)

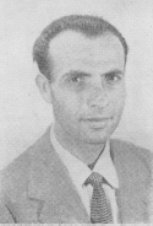
Francesco De Vita

Francesco De Vita (5 January 1913, in Trapani – 2 June 1961) was an Italian politician. He represented the Italian Republican Party in the Constituent Assembly of Italy from 1946 to 1948 and in the Chamber of Deputies from 1948 to 1963.
