= Francesco Colitto =

Italian politician (1897–1989)

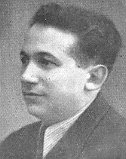
Francesco Colitto

Francesco Colitto (8 February 1897, Carovilli – 16 February 1989) was an Italian politician. He represented the Common Man's Front in the Constituent Assembly of Italy and the Italian Liberal Party in the Chamber of Deputies from 1948 to 1963.
