= People's Monarchist Party =

People's Monarchist Party may refer to:

- People's Monarchist Party (Italy)
- People's Monarchist Party (Portugal)
