= Giuseppe Ayroldi =

Italian politician

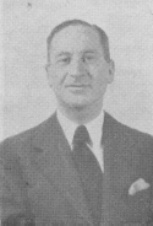
Giuseppe Ayroldi

Giuseppe Ayroldi (10 July 1895 – 15 October 1962) was an Italian politician.

Ayroldi was born in Ostuni. He represented the Common Man's Front in the Constituent Assembly of Italy from 1946 to 1948.
