= Capua (surname) =

Capua is a surname of Italian origin. Notable people with this surname include:

- Antonio Capua (1905–1966), Italian politician
- Ilaria Capua (born 1966), Italian virologist and former politician
- Joe Capua, American basketball player
- Roberta Capua (born 1968), Italian television host, actress and model

== See also ==
- Capua (disambiguation)
- Capuana
- Capuano
- Di Capua
