= Sicilian Independent Labour Party =

Sicilian Independent Labour Party Partito Indipendente Siciliano del Lavoro
- Leader: Ettore Lombardo Pellegrino
- Constituent Assembly: 0 / 556

The Sicilian Independent Labour Party (Italian: Partito Indipendente Siciliano del Lavoro) was a political party in Sicily, Italy. The party was led by Ettore Lombardo Pellegrino. The party contested the Catania–Messina–Siracusa–Ragusa–Enna constituency in the 1946 Constituent Assembly election. It obtained 10,246 votes (1.04% of the votes in the constituency). Around half of the votes, 4,426, came from the Messina province, where the party obtained 1.50% of the votes.
