= Ottavio Mastrojanni =

Italian politician (1896–1957)

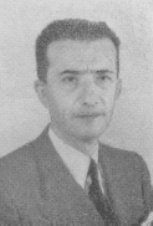
Ottavio Mastrojanni

Ottavio Mastrojanni (19 February 1896 - 31 January 1957) was an Italian politician.

Mastrojanni was born in Nicosia, Sicily. He represented the Common Man's Front in the Constituent Assembly of Italy from 1946 to 1948.
