= List of Italian constituencies (1946–1994) =

This is a list of Italian constituencies from 1946 to present. For the election of the Italian Chamber of Deputies, since 1993 Italy is divided in 27 districts called circoscrizioni. However, the distribution of seats being calculated at national level, districts serve only to choose the single candidates inside the party lists. During the election of the Italian Senate, according to the Constitution, each Region is a single district, without connections at national level.

During the Regional elections, the districts correspond to the Provinces, even if some seats are allocated at regional level. For the Provincial elections, a special system is used, based on localized lists: even if the competition is disputed on provincial level, candidates are presented in single-member districts, and their final position inside each party list depends by the percentage of votes they received in their own districts. Finally, for the Communal elections no districts are used.

== Electoral districts for the Chamber of Deputies from 1946 to 1994 ==
=== Aosta ===
Deputies for Aosta (1946–1994)
Key to parties PCI FDPR UV DC
Legislature	Election	Distribution
Constituent	1946	1
1st	1948	1
2nd	1953	1
3rd	1958	1
4th	1963	1
5th	1968	1
6th	1972	1
7th	1976	1
8th	1979	1
9th	1983	1
10th	1987	1
11th	1992	1

=== Turin–Novara–Vercelli ===
Deputies for Turin–Novara–Vercelli (1946–1994)
Key to parties PCI DP PDUP PRC PDS FDP PSIUP FdV PSI PSDI MC PR PRI LR DC PLI PNM LN MSI
Legislature	Election	Distribution
Constituent	1946	6 / 9 / 9 / 1
1st	1948	9 / 3 / 13
2nd	1953	7 / 4 / 2 / 11 / 1 / 1
3rd	1958	6 / 4 / 2 / 1 / 11 / 1 / 1
4th	1963	9 / 5 / 3 / 11 / 4 / 1
5th	1968	10 / 2 / 5 / 11 / 3 / 1
6th	1972	10 / 4 / 2 / 1 / 12 / 3 / 2
7th	1976	15 / 1 / 4 / 1 / 1 / 1 / 13 / 1 / 1
8th	1979	13 / 1 / 4 / 2 / 2 / 2 / 12 / 2 / 1
9th	1983	12 / 1 / 4 / 2 / 1 / 3 / 9 / 2 / 2
10th	1987	10 / 1 / 1 / 5 / 1 / 2 / 2 / 9 / 1 / 2
11th	1992	3 / 5 / 1 / 5 / 1 / 1 / 2 / 1 / 7 / 1 / 6 / 2

=== Cuneo–Alessandria–Asti ===
Deputies for Cuneo–Alessandria–Asti (1946–1994)
Key to parties PCI PRC PDS FDP PSI PSDI PRI PCdI DC PLI PNM LN
Legislature	Election	Distribution
Constituent	1946	3 / 4 / 1 / 7 / 1
1st	1948	4 / 2 / 1 / 9
2nd	1953	3 / 2 / 1 / 8 / 1 / 1
3rd	1958	2 / 2 / 1 / 8 / 1
4th	1963	3 / 2 / 1 / 7 / 1
5th	1968	3 / 1 / 3 / 7 / 1
6th	1972	3 / 2 / 1 / 7 / 1
7th	1976	5 / 1 / 1 / 1 / 7 / 1
8th	1979	4 / 1 / 1 / 1 / 7 / 1
9th	1983	4 / 1 / 1 / 1 / 6 / 1
10th	1987	3 / 2 / 1 / 1 / 6 / 1
11th	1992	1 / 1 / 2 / 4 / 1 / 3

=== Genoa–Imperia–La Spezia–Savona ===
Deputies for Genoa–Imperia–La Spezia–Savona (1946–1994)
Key to parties PCI PRC PDS FDP PSIUP FdV PSI PSDI PR PRI DC PLI LN MSI
Legislature	Election	Distribution
Constituent	1946	5 / 5 / 6
1st	1948	8 / 2 / 9
2nd	1953	5 / 3 / 1 / 8
3rd	1958	5 / 4 / 1 / 9 / 1 / 1
4th	1963	7 / 3 / 2 / 8 / 2 / 1
5th	1968	7 / 1 / 4 / 8 / 2
6th	1972	7 / 3 / 1 / 1 / 8 / 1 / 1
7th	1976	9 / 2 / 1 / 1 / 8 / 1
8th	1979	8 / 3 / 1 / 1 / 8 / 1 / 1
9th	1983	8 / 2 / 1 / 1 / 6 / 1 / 1
10th	1987	7 / 1 / 3 / 1 / 1 / 6 / 1 / 1
11th	1992	1 / 4 / 1 / 2 / 1 / 5 / 1 / 3 / 1

=== Milan–Pavia ===
Deputies for Milan–Pavia (1946–1994)
Key to parties PCI DP PRC PDS FDP PSIUP FdV PSI PSDI PR PRI LR DC PLI PNM PMP UQ LN MSI
Legislature	Election	Distribution
Constituent	1946	9 / 12 / 12 / 1
1st	1948	14 / 4 / 18
2nd	1953	8 / 7 / 2 / 16 / 1 / 1 / 1
3rd	1958	9 / 7 / 3 / 15 / 2 / 1 / 1 / 1
4th	1963	11 / 9 / 3 / 15 / 5 / 2
5th	1968	13 / 2 / 8 / 1 / 17 / 4 / 2
6th	1972	13 / 6 / 2 / 2 / 16 / 3 / 3
7th	1976	19 / 1 / 6 / 1 / 1 / 2 / 19 / 1 / 2
8th	1979	17 / 1 / 6 / 2 / 2 / 2 / 18 / 2 / 2
9th	1983	16 / 2 / 6 / 2 / 2 / 4 / 14 / 2 / 3
10th	1987	13 / 2 / 2 / 9 / 1 / 2 / 2 / 14 / 1 / 2
11th	1992	3 / 7 / 2 / 7 / 1 / 1 / 3 / 1 / 10 / 1 / 10 / 2

=== Como–Sondrio–Varese ===
Deputies for Como–Sondrio–Varese (1946–1994)
Key to parties PCI PRC PDS FDP PSIUP FdV PSI PSDI PR PRI DC PLI LN MSI
Legislature	Election	Distribution
Constituent	1946	1 / 5 / 6
1st	1948	4 / 1 / 9
2nd	1953	2 / 3 / 1 / 9
3rd	1958	2 / 3 / 1 / 8
4th	1963	2 / 4 / 1 / 9 / 1
5th	1968	3 / 1 / 3 / 9 / 1
6th	1972	3 / 2 / 1 / 9 / 1 / 1
7th	1976	5 / 1 / 2 / 1 / 9 / 1
8th	1979	5 / 2 / 1 / 1 / 1 / 9 / 1
9th	1983	5 / 2 / 1 / 1 / 1 / 8 / 1 / 1
10th	1987	4 / 1 / 4 / 1 / 7 / 1 / 1 / 1
11th	1992	1 / 2 / 1 / 3 / 5 / 6 / 1

=== Brescia–Bergamo ===
Deputies for Brescia–Bergamo (1946–1994)
Key to parties PCI DP PDUP PRC PDS FDP PSIUP FdV PSI PSDI PR PRI DC PLI LN MSI
Legislature	Election	Distribution
Constituent	1946	2 / 4 / 9
1st	1948	4 / 1 / 14
2nd	1953	2 / 3 / 1 / 13
3rd	1958	2 / 3 / 1 / 12 / 1
4th	1963	2 / 3 / 1 / 12 / 1
5th	1968	3 / 1 / 3 / 9 / 1
6th	1972	2 / 3 / 1 / 12 / 1 / 1
7th	1976	5 / 1 / 2 / 12 / 1
8th	1979	5 / 1 / 2 / 1 / 1 / 12 / 1
9th	1983	5 / 1 / 2 / 1 / 1 / 1 / 10 / 1 / 1
10th	1987	4 / 1 / 1 / 3 / 1 / 10 / 1
11th	1992	1 / 2 / 1 / 2 / 1 / 7 / 6 / 1

=== Mantova–Cremona ===
Deputies for Mantova–Cremona (1946–1994)
Key to parties PCI PRC PDS FDP PSI DC LN
Legislature	Election	Distribution
Constituent	1946	2 / 3 / 3
1st	1948	5 / 5
2nd	1953	2 / 3 / 5
3rd	1958	3 / 2 / 5
4th	1963	3 / 2 / 4
5th	1968	3 / 2 / 4
6th	1972	3 / 1 / 4
7th	1976	3 / 1 / 4
8th	1979	3 / 1 / 4
9th	1983	3 / 1 / 4
10th	1987	3 / 1 / 3
11th	1992	1 / 2 / 2 / 3 / 2

=== Trento–Bolzano ===
Deputies for Trento–Bolzano (1946–1994)
Key to parties PCI FDP FdV PSI PSDI LR SVP DC MSI LN
Legislature	Election	Distribution
Constituent	1946	1 / 3
1st	1948	1 / 3 / 5
2nd	1953	3 / 5
3rd	1958	1 / 1 / 3 / 5
4th	1963	1 / 1 / 3 / 5
5th	1968	1 / 1 / 3 / 4
6th	1972	1 / 1 / 3 / 5
7th	1976	1 / 1 / 3 / 4
8th	1979	1 / 1 / 4 / 4
9th	1983	1 / 1 / 3 / 3
10th	1987	1 / 1 / 1 / 3 / 3 / 1
11th	1992	1 / 1 / 1 / 3 / 3 / 1

=== Verona–Padova–Vicenza–Rovigo ===
Deputies for Verona–Padova–Vicenza–Rovigo (1946–1994)
Key to parties PCI DP PRC PDS FDP PSIUP FdV LAV PSI PSDI PR PRI LR DC PLI LN MSI
Legislature	Election	Distribution
Constituent	1946	4 / 8 / 15
1st	1948	7 / 2 / 19
2nd	1953	4 / 4 / 1 / 17 / 1 / 1
3rd	1958	4 / 4 / 1 / 18 / 1 / 1
4th	1963	4 / 4 / 1 / 17 / 2 / 1
5th	1968	4 / 1 / 4 / 17 / 1 / 1
6th	1972	5 / 2 / 1 / 1 / 17 / 1 / 1
7th	1976	6 / 3 / 1 / 1 / 16 / 1
8th	1979	6 / 2 / 1 / 1 / 1 / 16 / 1 / 1
9th	1983	6 / 1 / 3 / 1 / 1 / 1 / 14 / 1 / 1 / 1
10th	1987	5 / 1 / 1 / 4 / 1 / 1 / 1 / 14 / 1 / 1
11th	1992	1 / 3 / 1 / 1 / 3 / 1 / 1 / 10 / 1 / 5 / 1

=== Venezia–Treviso ===
Deputies for Venezia–Treviso (1946–1994)
Key to parties PCI PRC PDS FDP PSIUP FdV PSI PSDI PR PRI DC PLI LN MSI
Legislature	Election	Distribution
Constituent	1946	2 / 4 / 7
1st	1948	4 / 2 / 10
2nd	1953	3 / 2 / 1 / 10
3rd	1958	3 / 3 / 1 / 9
4th	1963	3 / 3 / 1 / 9 / 1
5th	1968	4 / 1 / 3 / 9 / 1
6th	1972	4 / 2 / 1 / 9 / 1 / 1
7th	1976	5 / 2 / 1 / 8
8th	1979	5 / 2 / 1 / 1 / 8
9th	1983	4 / 2 / 1 / 1 / 7 / 1
10th	1987	4 / 1 / 3 / 1 / 7
11th	1992	1 / 2 / 1 / 2 / 1 / 5 / 3

=== Udine–Belluno–Gorizia–Pordenone ===
Deputies for Udine–Belluno–Gorizia–Pordenone (1946–1994)
Key to parties PCI PRC PDS FDP PSIUP PSI PSDI PRI DC PLI LN MSI
Legislature	Election	Distribution
Constituent	1946	1 / 4 / 6
1st	1948	4 / 2 / 9
2nd	1953	2 / 2 / 1 / 9 / 1
3rd	1958	2 / 2 / 1 / 8 / 1
4th	1963	2 / 2 / 2 / 7 / 1
5th	1968	3 / 1 / 3 / 7 / 1
6th	1972	3 / 2 / 1 / 7 / 1
7th	1976	4 / 2 / 1 / 6
8th	1979	3 / 1 / 1 / 6
9th	1983	3 / 2 / 1 / 1 / 6 / 1
10th	1987	3 / 3 / 1 / 5 / 1
11th	1992	1 / 2 / 1 / 4 / 3 / 1

=== Trieste ===
Deputies for Trieste (1958–1994)
Key to parties PCI PDS PSI LpT DC MSI
Legislature	Election	Distribution
3rd	1958	1 / 2 / 1
4th	1963	1 / 2
5th	1968	1 / 2
6th	1972	1 / 2 / 1
7th	1976	1 / 2
8th	1979	1 / 1 / 1
9th	1983	1 / 2
10th	1987	1 / 1 / 1
11th	1992	1 / 1 / 1

=== Bologna–Ferrara–Ravenna–Forlì ===
Deputies for Bologna–Ferrara–Ravenna–Forlì (1946–1994)
Key to parties PCI PRC PDS FDP PSIUP FdV PSI PSDI PR PRI DC PLI LN MSI
Legislature	Election	Distribution
Constituent	1946	9 / 7 / 2 / 4
1st	1948	13 / 2 / 7
2nd	1953	10 / 3 / 1 / 1 / 7
3rd	1958	10 / 4 / 2 / 2 / 7 / 1 / 1
4th	1963	12 / 4 / 2 / 1 / 6 / 1 / 1
5th	1968	12 / 1 / 4 / 1 / 6 / 1
6th	1972	12 / 2 / 2 / 2 / 7 / 1 / 1
7th	1976	14 / 2 / 1 / 2 / 7 / 1
8th	1979	13 / 2 / 1 / 1 / 2 / 7 / 1
9th	1983	13 / 2 / 1 / 1 / 2 / 5 / 2 / 1
10th	1987	12 / 1 / 3 / 1 / 2 / 6 / 1
11th	1992	2 / 9 / 1 / 3 / 1 / 2 / 5 / 1 / 2 / 1

=== Parma–Modena–Piacenza–Reggio Emilia ===
Deputies for Parma–Modena–Piacenza–Reggio Emilia (1946–1994)
Key to parties PCI PRC PDS FDP PSIUP PSI PSDI PRI DC PLI LN MSI
Legislature	Election	Distribution
Constituent	1946	7 / 6 / 6
1st	1948	10 / 2 / 7
2nd	1953	8 / 3 / 1 / 7
3rd	1958	7 / 3 / 1 / 7 / 1
4th	1963	8 / 3 / 1 / 6 / 1
5th	1968	9 / 1 / 3 / 6 / 1
6th	1972	9 / 2 / 1 / 6 / 1 / 1
7th	1976	10 / 2 / 1 / 6
8th	1979	10 / 2 / 1 / 6
9th	1983	10 / 2 / 1 / 1 / 5 / 1
10th	1987	9 / 1 / 3 / 6 / 1
11th	1992	1 / 6 / 2 / 1 / 4 / 3 / 1

=== Florence–Pistoia ===
Deputies for Florence–Pistoia (1946–1994)
Key to parties PCI PRC PDS FDP PSI PSDI PRI DC PLI LN MSI
Legislature	Election	Distribution
Constituent	1946	5 / 3 / 4
1st	1948	7 / 6
2nd	1953	6 / 2 / 5
3rd	1958	6 / 2 / 5
4th	1963	7 / 2 / 1 / 5 / 1
5th	1968	8 / 2 / 5 / 1
6th	1972	8 / 1 / 1 / 5 / 1
7th	1976	9 / 1 / 5
8th	1979	9 / 1 / 5
9th	1983	9 / 2 / 1 / 4
10th	1987	8 / 2 / 4
11th	1992	2 / 6 / 2 / 1 / 4 / 1 / 1

=== Pisa–Livorno–Lucca–Massa Carrara ===
Deputies for Pisa–Livorno–Lucca–Massa Carrara (1946–1994)
Key to parties PCI PRC PDS FDP PSIUP FdV PSI PSDI PRI DC PLI LN MSI
Legislature	Election	Distribution
Constituent	1946	4 / 3 / 1 / 5
1st	1948	7 / 7
2nd	1953	5 / 2 / 6
3rd	1958	5 / 3 / 6
4th	1963	5 / 3 / 1 / 1 / 5
5th	1968	6 / 1 / 2 / 5 / 1
6th	1972	6 / 1 / 1 / 1 / 6 / 1
7th	1976	7 / 1 / 6
8th	1979	7 / 2 / 5
9th	1983	7 / 2 / 1 / 4 / 1
10th	1987	6 / 2 / 5 / 1
11th	1992	1 / 4 / 1 / 2 / 1 / 4 / 1 / 1 / 1

=== Siena–Arezzo–Grosseto ===
Deputies for Siena–Arezzo–Grosseto (1946–1994)
Key to parties PCI PRC PDS FDP PSI DC
Legislature	Election	Distribution
Constituent	1946	4 / 2 / 2
1st	1948	6 / 3
2nd	1953	5 / 2 / 3
3rd	1958	4 / 2 / 3
4th	1963	5 / 2 / 3
5th	1968	5 / 1 / 3
6th	1972	5 / 1 / 3
7th	1976	5 / 1 / 3
8th	1979	5 / 1 / 3
9th	1983	5 / 1 / 3
10th	1987	5 / 1 / 3
11th	1992	1 / 3 / 1 / 2

=== Ancona–Pesaro–Macerata–Ascoli Piceno ===
Deputies for Ancona–Pesaro–Macerata–Ascoli Piceno (1946–1994)
Key to parties PCI PRC PDS FDP PSIUP FdV PSI PSDI PRI DC PLI MSI
Legislature	Election	Distribution
Constituent	1946	3 / 3 / 2 / 5
1st	1948	6 / 1 / 1 / 9
2nd	1953	4 / 3 / 8
3rd	1958	5 / 3 / 1 / 1 / 8 / 1
4th	1963	6 / 2 / 1 / 1 / 7 / 1 / 1
5th	1968	6 / 1 / 2 / 1 / 7
6th	1972	6 / 1 / 1 / 1 / 7 / 1
7th	1976	7 / 1 / 7 / 1
8th	1979	7 / 1 / 1 / 7 / 1
9th	1983	7 / 2 / 1 / 6 / 1
10th	1987	6 / 2 / 1 / 6 / 1
11th	1992	1 / 4 / 1 / 2 / 1 / 6 / 1

=== Perugia–Terni–Rieti ===
Deputies for Perugia–Terni–Rieti (1946–1994)
Key to parties PCI PRC PDS FDP PSIUP PSI PSDI PRI DC MSI
Legislature	Election	Distribution
Constituent	1946	3 / 2 / 1 / 3
1st	1948	6 / 5
2nd	1953	3 / 3 / 4 / 1
3rd	1958	4 / 3 / 5 / 1
4th	1963	5 / 2 / 4 / 1
5th	1968	5 / 1 / 2 / 4 / 1
6th	1972	5 / 1 / 4 / 1
7th	1976	6 / 1 / 4 / 1
8th	1979	5 / 1 / 4
9th	1983	5 / 1 / 3 / 1
10th	1987	5 / 2 / 4 / 1
11th	1992	1 / 4 / 2 / 3 / 1

=== Rome–Viterbo–Latina–Frosinone ===
Deputies for Rome–Viterbo–Latina–Frosinone (1946–1994)
Key to parties PCI DP PDUP PRC PDS FDP PSIUP FdV PSI PSDI PR PRI LR DC PLI PNM/PDIUM PMP UQ MSI
Legislature	Election	Distribution
Constituent	1946	4 / 3 / 5 / 11 / 2 / 2 / 2
1st	1948	10 / 1 / 2 / 20 / 1
2nd	1953	10 / 3 / 1 / 1 / 15 / 1 / 3 / 4
3rd	1958	9 / 5 / 1 / 1 / 16 / 1 / 1 / 1 / 4
4th	1963	12 / 6 / 3 / 1 / 16 / 4 / 1 / 5
5th	1968	13 / 1 / 6 / 1 / 17 / 4 / 1 / 4
6th	1972	13 / 4 / 3 / 2 / 17 / 2 / 7
7th	1976	20 / 1 / 4 / 2 / 1 / 2 / 19 / 1 / 5
8th	1979	16 / 1 / 5 / 2 / 3 / 2 / 20 / 1 / 4
9th	1983	16 / 1 / 5 / 2 / 2 / 3 / 17 / 2 / 5
10th	1987	14 / 1 / 2 / 7 / 2 / 2 / 2 / 19 / 1 / 4
11th	1992	3 / 10 / 2 / 7 / 2 / 2 / 3 / 1 / 17 / 2 / 5

=== L'Aquila–Pescara–Chieti–Teramo ===
Deputies for L'Aquila–Pescara–Chieti–Teramo (1946–1994)
Key to parties PCI PRC PDS FDP PSI PSDI PR PRI DC PLI PNM PMP MSI
Legislature	Election	Distribution
Constituent	1946	1 / 2 / 1 / 7 / 1
1st	1948	5 / 1 / 10
2nd	1953	4 / 1 / 7 / 1 / 1
3rd	1958	4 / 2 / 8 / 1 / 1 / 1
4th	1963	4 / 2 / 1 / 7 / 1 / 1
5th	1968	4 / 2 / 8 / 1
6th	1972	4 / 1 / 1 / 8 / 1
7th	1976	5 / 1 / 7 / 1
8th	1979	5 / 1 / 7 / 1
9th	1983	5 / 1 / 7 / 1
10th	1987	4 / 2 / 1 / 7 / 1
11th	1992	1 / 3 / 2 / 1 / 1 / 6 / 1 / 1

=== Campobasso–Isernia ===
Deputies for Campobasso–Isernia (1946–1994)
Key to parties PCI PRC PDS PSI DC PLI UQ
Legislature	Election	Distribution
Constituent	1946	4 / 2 / 1
1st	1948	3 / 1
2nd	1953	1 / 3 / 1
3rd	1958	1 / 4 / 1
4th	1963	1 / 3
5th	1968	1 / 1 / 3
6th	1972	1 / 3
7th	1976	1 / 3
8th	1979	1 / 3
9th	1983	1 / 3
10th	1987	1 / 3
11th	1992	1 / 1 / 3

=== Naples–Caserta ===
Deputies for Naples–Caserta (1946–1994)
Key to parties PCI DP PDUP PRC PDS FDP PSIUP FdV PSI PSDI PR PRI LR DC PLI PNM/PDIUM PMP UQ MSI
Legislature	Election	Distribution
Constituent	1946	2 / 2 / 11 / 6 / 2 / 4
1st	1948	7 / 1 / 17 / 1 / 4 / 1
2nd	1953	7 / 2 / 12 / 1 / 7 / 2
3rd	1958	8 / 3 / 1 / 14 / 1 / 6 / 1
4th	1963	10 / 4 / 2 / 15 / 2 / 3 / 2
5th	1968	10 / 1 / 5 / 1 / 15 / 1 / 2 / 3
6th	1972	10 / 3 / 2 / 1 / 14 / 1 / 7
7th	1976	14 / 1 / 3 / 1 / 1 / 15 / 4
8th	1979	11 / 1 / 3 / 1 / 1 / 1 / 16 / 4
9th	1983	11 / 1 / 5 / 2 / 1 / 1 / 14 / 1 / 6
10th	1987	10 / 1 / 6 / 2 / 1 / 1 / 17 / 1 / 3
11th	1992	2 / 8 / 1 / 6 / 1 / 1 / 1 / 1 / 18 / 2 / 3

=== Benevento–Avellino–Salerno ===
Deputies for Benvento–Avellino–Salerno (1946–1994)
Key to parties PCI PDS FDP PSIUP PSI PSDI PDL PRI DC PLI PNM/PDIUM PMP UQ MSI
Legislature	Election	Distribution
Constituent	1946	1 / 1 / 1 / 4 / 3 / 1 / 1
1st	1948	3 / 11 / 2 / 2
2nd	1953	4 / 1 / 8 / 1 / 5 / 1
3rd	1958	4 / 2 / 1 / 10 / 1 / 1 / 1 / 1
4th	1963	4 / 2 / 2 / 10 / 1 / 1 / 1
5th	1968	4 / 1 / 3 / 10 / 1 / 1 / 1
6th	1972	4 / 2 / 1 / 1 / 11 / 1 / 3
7th	1976	5 / 1 / 1 / 9 / 2
8th	1979	4 / 2 / 1 / 10 / 1
9th	1983	4 / 3 / 1 / 9 / 1
10th	1987	4 / 3 / 1 / 1 / 9 / 1
11th	1992	2 / 5 / 1 / 1 / 9 / 1

=== Bari–Foggia ===
Deputies for Bari–Foggia (1946–1994)
Key to parties PCI PRC PDS FDP PSIUP FdV PSI PSDI PR PRI DC PLI PNM UQ MSI
Legislature	Election	Distribution
Constituent	1946	4 / 2 / 7 / 1 / 4
1st	1948	7 / 12 / 2 / 1
2nd	1953	6 / 2 / 9 / 4 / 1
3rd	1958	7 / 3 / 10 / 1 / 1
4th	1963	7 / 3 / 1 / 10 / 1 / 1
5th	1968	7 / 3 / 11 / 1 / 1
6th	1972	4 / 2 / 1 / 1 / 11 / 1 / 3
7th	1976	7 / 3 / 1 / 10 / 3
8th	1979	7 / 2 / 1 / 1 / 10 / 2
9th	1983	6 / 4 / 1 / 1 / 9 / 1 / 3
10th	1987	6 / 4 / 1 / 1 / 10 / 1 / 2
11th	1992	1 / 3 / 1 / 5 / 1 / 1 / 10 / 1 / 2

=== Lecce–Brindisi–Taranto ===
Deputies for Lecce–Brindisi–Taranto (1946–1994)
Key to parties PCI PRC PDS FDP PSI PSDI PRI DC PLI PNM MSI
Legislature	Election	Distribution
Constituent	1946	1 / 1 / 5 / 2 / 3
1st	1948	4 / 9 / 2 / 1
2nd	1953	6 / 2 / 9 / 4 / 1
3rd	1958	4 / 2 / 9 / 1 / 2
4th	1963	4 / 2 / 9 / 1 / 2
5th	1968	5 / 2 / 9 / 1 / 2
6th	1972	5 / 2 / 9 / 2
7th	1976	6 / 2 / 8 / 2
8th	1979	5 / 2 / 9 / 2
9th	1983	5 / 3 / 1 / 1 / 8 / 2
10th	1987	5 / 3 / 1 / 1 / 8 / 2
11th	1992	1 / 3 / 3 / 1 / 1 / 7 / 2

=== Potenza–Matera ===
Deputies for Potenza–Matera (1946–1994)
Key to parties PCI PDS FDP PSI DC PLI PNM
Legislature	Election	Distribution
Constituent	1946	1 / 1 / 2 / 1
1st	1948	2 / 4
2nd	1953	2 / 4 / 1
3rd	1958	2 / 1 / 4
4th	1963	3 / 1 / 4
5th	1968	2 / 1 / 5
6th	1972	2 / 1 / 5
7th	1976	3 / 1 / 4
8th	1979	2 / 1 / 4
9th	1983	2 / 1 / 4
10th	1987	2 / 1 / 4
11th	1992	1 / 1 / 4

=== Catanzaro–Cosenza–Reggio Calabria ===
Deputies for Catanzaro–Cosenza–Reggio Calabria (1946–1994)
Key to parties PCI PDUP PRC PDS FDP PSIUP PSI PSDI PRI DC PLI PNM PMP UQ MSI
Legislature	Election	Distribution
Constituent	1946	3 / 2 / 1 / 8 / 3 / 2 / 2
1st	1948	8 / 13 / 2 / 1
2nd	1953	6 / 3 / 11 / 1 / 2 / 2
3rd	1958	6 / 3 / 13 / 1 / 1 / 1 / 1
4th	1963	7 / 3 / 1 / 12 / 1 / 2
5th	1968	6 / 1 / 5 / 1 / 11 / 1 / 1
6th	1972	7 / 3 / 1 / 10 / 3
7th	1976	8 / 3 / 10 / 2
8th	1979	6 / 1 / 3 / 1 / 10 / 2
9th	1983	6 / 4 / 1 / 1 / 9 / 2
10th	1987	6 / 4 / 1 / 1 / 9 / 1
11th	1992	2 / 4 / 4 / 2 / 1 / 9 / 1 / 1

=== Catania–Messina–Siracusa–Ragusa–Enna ===
Deputies for Catania–Messina–Siracusa–Ragusa–Enna (1946–1994)
Key to parties PCI PRC PDS FDP PSIUP PSI PSDI MIS PR PRI LR DC PLI PNM/PDIUM PMP UQ MSI
Legislature	Election	Distribution
Constituent	1946	1 / 3 / 2 / 10 / 4 / 1 / 2
1st	1948	5 / 2 / 15 / 2 / 2
2nd	1953	6 / 2 / 10 / 1 / 3 / 3
3rd	1958	6 / 3 / 13 / 2 / 1 / 1 / 2
4th	1963	7 / 3 / 1 / 12 / 3 / 1 / 2
5th	1968	7 / 1 / 3 / 1 / 13 / 2 / 2
6th	1972	7 / 2 / 1 / 1 / 12 / 1 / 6
7th	1976	8 / 2 / 1 / 1 / 12 / 1 / 4
8th	1979	6 / 3 / 1 / 1 / 12 / 1 / 3
9th	1983	6 / 4 / 1 / 1 / 11 / 1 / 3
10th	1987	6 / 4 / 1 / 1 / 1 / 11 / 1 / 3
11th	1992	1 / 3 / 5 / 1 / 2 / 2 / 12 / 1 / 2

=== Palermo–Trapani–Agrigento–Caltanissetta ===
Deputies for Palermo–Trapani–Agrigento–Caltanissetta (1946–1994)
Key to parties PCI DP PRC PDS FDP PSIUP PSI PSDI MIS PR PRI LR DC PLI PNM/PDIUM PMP UQ MSI
Legislature	Election	Distribution
Constituent	1946	2 / 3 / 2 / 1 / 8 / 3 / 2
1st	1948	6 / 1 / 13 / 2 / 2 / 1
2nd	1953	6 / 2 / 11 / 3 / 3
3rd	1958	6 / 3 / 1 / 1 / 13 / 1 / 1 / 1 / 2
4th	1963	7 / 3 / 1 / 1 / 12 / 2 / 1 / 2
5th	1968	7 / 1 / 3 / 2 / 12 / 1 / 1 / 2
6th	1972	7 / 3 / 1 / 1 / 13 / 1 / 4
7th	1976	7 / 2 / 1 / 1 / 12 / 2
8th	1979	5 / 3 / 1 / 1 / 1 / 12 / 2
9th	1983	6 / 3 / 1 / 1 / 11 / 1 / 2
10th	1987	5 / 1 / 4 / 1 / 1 / 1 / 11 / 1 / 2
11th	1992	1 / 2 / 3 / 2 / 1 / 4 / 12 / 1 / 1

=== Cagliari–Sassari–Nuoro–Oristano ===
Deputies for Cagliari–Sassari–Nuoro–Oristano (1946–1994)
Key to parties PCI PRC PDS FDP PSdAZ PSIUP PSI PSDI PRI DC PLI PNM/PDIUM UQ MSI
Legislature	Election	Distribution
Constituent	1946	1 / 2 / 1 / 6 / 1
1st	1948	3 / 1 / 9 / 1
2nd	1953	4 / 1 / 7 / 1 / 1
3rd	1958	3 / 2 / 8 / 1 / 1
4th	1963	4 / 2 / 1 / 8 / 1 / 1 / 1
5th	1968	5 / 1 / 2 / 8 / 1 / 1 / 1
6th	1972	5 / 1 / 1 / 8 / 2
7th	1976	7 / 1 / 7 / 1
8th	1979	6 / 2 / 1 / 7 / 1
9th	1983	6 / 1 / 2 / 1 / 6 / 1
10th	1987	5 / 2 / 2 / 1 / 7 / 1
11th	1992	1 / 3 / 1 / 3 / 1 / 1 / 7 / 1 / 1
