= Antonio Capua =

Italian politician (1905–1996)

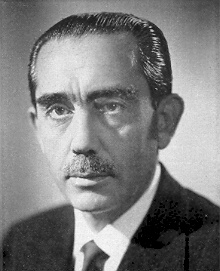
Antonio Capua

Antonio Capua (19 October 1905 - 12 April 1996) was an Italian politician.

Capua was born in Melicuccà. He represented the Common Man's Front in the Constituent Assembly of Italy from 1946 to 1948 and the Italian Liberal Party in the Chamber of Deputies from 1948 to 1972.
