= Republican Progressive Democratic Front =

Republican Progressive Democratic Front Fronte Democratico Progressista Repubblicano
- Leader: Giulio Bordon
- Political position: Left-wing

The Republican Progressive Democratic Front (Italian: Fronte Democratico Progressista Repubblicano) was a political coalition in the Aosta Valley, formed ahead of the 1946 Italian Constituent Assembly election. Aosta Valley had just been declared an autonomous province by the government of Italy to prevent a risk of annexation by De Gaulle's France, and a special FPTP electoral constituency was created. The Front obtained 21,853 votes (51.79%) of the votes in the Aosta Valley and won the sole seat of the constituency. Giulio Bordon was the FDPR parliamentarian. Bordon sat in the Autonomist group in the Constituent Assembly together with the Action Party.

== Composition ==
It was composed of the following leftist political parties:

Party	Ideology	Leader
Italian Socialist Party (PSI)	Socialism	Pietro Nenni
Italian Communist Party (PCI)	Communism	Palmiro Togliatti
Italian Republican Party (PRI)	Republicanism	Randolfo Pacciardi
Action Party (PdA)	Liberal socialism	Riccardo Lombardi

== Electoral results ==
Constituent Assembly
Election year	Votes	%	Seats	+/−	Leader
1946	21,853 (1st) (Note: Only in Aosta Valley.)	51.8	1 / 1	–	Giulio Bordon
