= National Bloc of Freedom =

National Bloc of Freedom Blocco Nazionale della Libertà
- Chairman: Alfredo Covelli; Roberto Lucifero d'Aprigliano
- Founded: 1946
- Dissolved: 1947; 79 years ago
- Merged into: National Monarchist Party
- Headquarters: Rome, Italy
- Ideology: Conservatism; Monarchism
- Political position: Right-wing
- Colours: Savoy blue

The National Bloc of Freedom (Blocco Nazionale della Libertà) was a short-lived Italian political coalition of monarchist parties, most of which participated to the foundation of the National Monarchist Party. Its symbol was a star. It was composed of Italian Democratic Party (PDI), National Democratic Liberal Concentration (CNDL) and Democratic Centre (CD).

It contested the Italian elections of 1946, where it received a 3% of votes and elected 16 deputies, and lost the contemporaneous referendum about between republic or monarchy.

Immediately after the election, the coalition collapsed between populist, monarchist and liberal approaches. Only 10 deputies joined the parliamentary group. In January 1947 the coalition definitely disappeared between the Common Man's Front (6 deputies), the Monarchist National Party (7 deputies) and the Italian Liberal Party (3 deputies).

== Electoral results ==
Election	Votes	%	Seats	Position	Status
1946	637,328	2.77	16 / 556	7th	Opposition
