= Social Christian Party (Italy) =

Social Christian Party Partito Cristiano Sociale
- Leader: Gerardo Bruni
- Founded: January 1, 1944
- Dissolved: April 19, 1948
- Split from: Christian Democracy
- Ideology: Christian socialism Christian left
- Political position: Left-wing

The Social Christian Party (Italian: Partito Cristiano Sociale) was a political party founded and led by the Italian philosopher and librarian of the Vatican Library Gerardo Bruni.

== History ==
Born at the beginning as a movement of Christians during the Resistance, partisans participated with other groups in their initial meetings to help form Christian Democracy. The founder, however, occurred an irremediable conflict between Bruni and other groups and Christian Democrats, who he felt were too moderate and supportive of capitalism, and they separated. The movement was transformed into a party for elections for the Constituent Assembly on June 2, 1946. The party supported the establishment of a Republic, used its own symbol (formed by a book and a shovel over a cross), collected 51,088 votes - the equivalent of 0.22% nationally - and elected a representative, Gerard Bruni.

The manifesto of 1946 outlined the party's politics as those of Christian socialism, putting stakes very clear and stressing their absolute autonomy, even in the context of the wider left:

We are not Christian Democrats because we do not accept any compromise with the unjust and oppressive capitalist world, in a party with rich and poor, capitalists and workers are always the poor to be worse. We are not Marxists or Communists, because we are not materialists, because we do not want dictatorship, nor a Member of our boss, why not admit foreign dependencies. We are not in the Socialist Party because despite new trends is not yet clearly free of the old materialistic mentality, because it has not yet found its way and independent living. We are for social teaching. Christian socialism does not mean socialism "right" means the primacy of spirit, respect for the person and his natural and eternal, it means absolute loyalty to a radical program of political renewal and economic development. The Constituent Assembly we will defend vigorously, along with other Catholics, our Christian principles and will support our socialist cause, which is the cause of all workers.

The choice of autonomy from the other left parties, particularly with respect to Italian Communist Party (PCI) distinguished the Social Christian Party from the Party of the Christian Left of Franco Rodano which merged in the PCI since 1945. Bruni at the Constituent Assembly, inter alia, like Nenni and unlike Togliatti, was against the inclusion of the Concordat in the Constitution and voted against. The party stood in the elections of 1948 siding with the left, but refusing to enter the lists of the Popular Democratic Front. With the little strength which was available and the ostracism of the Church (Bruni in 1947 lost his job in the Vatican Library for his political positions), the party picked up 72,854 votes, 0.28% of the total vote, but no seats in parliament. Following this defeat, the party broke up and the founder Bruni continued his activities in certain movements of the Christian Left and independent socialist groups (including the 1953-57 experience of the Independent Socialist).

== Election results ==
=== Chamber of Deputies ===
Election	Votes	%	Seats	+/−	Leader
1946	51,088 (#14)	0.22	1 / 556	–	Gerardo Bruni
1948	72,854 (#10)	0.28	0 / 574	▼1	Gerardo Bruni

Notes

- In 1948, for the Senate the PSC run under the Socialist Unity.
