= Antonio Capuano =

Antonio Capuano may refer to:

- Antonio Capuano (actor) (died 1963), Argentine actor
- Antonio Capuano (director) (born 1940), Italian film director
