= Capuana =

Capuana is an Italian surname. Notable people with the surname include:

- Franco Capuana, Italian conductor
- Luigi Capuana, Italian author and journalist
- Maria Capuana, Italian opera singer
- Mario Capuana, Italian composer of motets and a requiem

== See also ==
- Capua (surname)
- Di Capua
- Capuano
