= Di Capua =

Di Capua is an Italian surname. Notable people with the surname include:

- Eduardo Di Capua, a Neapolitan composer, singer and songwriter.
- Giuseppe Di Capua, an Italian competition rowing coxswain and Olympic champion

== See also ==
- Capua (surname)
- Capuana
