= Italian Democratic Party of Monarchist Unity =

Defunct political party in Italy

Italian Democratic Party of Monarchist Unity Partito Democratico Italiano di Unità Monarchica
- Secretary: Alfredo Covelli
- President: Achille Lauro
- Founded: 11 April 1959
- Dissolved: 11 July 1972; 54 years ago
- Merger of: People's Monarchist Party; National Monarchist Party
- Merged into: Italian Social Movement; Monarchist Alliance
- Newspaper: Italia Monarchica
- Membership (1961): 50,000
- Ideology: Monarchism
- Political position: Right-wing
- International affiliation: None
- Colours: Blue

The Italian Democratic Party of Monarchist Unity (Italian: Partito Democratico Italiano di Unità Monarchica, PDIUM) was an Italian monarchist political party.

== History ==
The PDIUM was founded in 1959 as the Italian Democratic Party (Partito Democratico Italiano), a merger of the People's Monarchist Party and the National Monarchist Party. It became the PDIUM in 1961.

The new party, like its predecessors, was hampered by provisions in the Italian Constitution of 1946 making it all but impossible to restore the monarchy short of adopting a new constitution. The document specifically forbade a referendum on changing the republican form of government, and (until 2002) barred male members of the House of Savoy from returning to Italy. It was never able to repeat the results of its predecessors: electoral support for its monarchist cause shrank in the 1963 general election (1.8%) and in those of 1968 (1.3%), due to the successes of the Italian Liberal Party (respectively 7.0 and 5.8%).

In 1970, the party formed an alliance with the neo-fascist Italian Social Movement (MSI) known as the National Right (Italian: Destra Nazionale). In 1972, PDIUM fully merged into the MSI. Alfredo Covelli, long-time monarchist leader, was elected president of MSI. In 1976 Covelli led a moderate split of MSI and established National Democracy.

A small part of the party, more tied to liberal and Risorgimento inspiration, however, refused the alliance with the political heirs of fascism and gave life to the Monarchist Alliance.

== Electoral results ==
=== Italian Parliament ===
Chamber of Deputies
Election year	Votes	%	Seats	+/–	Leader
1963	536,948 (7th)	1.75	8 / 630	▼3	Alfredo Covelli
1968	414,507 (8th)	1.30	6 / 630	▼2	Alfredo Covelli

Senate of the Republic
Election year	Votes	%	Seats	+/–	Leader
1963	689,708 (7th)	2.51	3 / 315	▲1	Alfredo Covelli
1968	605,051 (7th)	2.58	2 / 315	▼1	Alfredo Covelli
