= 1946 Italian general election =

- 2–3 June 1946

556 of the 573 seats in the Constituent Assembly (Note: A total of 573 seats were allocated, but polls were not held in the Julian March or South Tyrol, these areas being under Allied occupation at the time) 279 seats needed for a majority
- Registered: 28,005,449
- Turnout: 89.08%
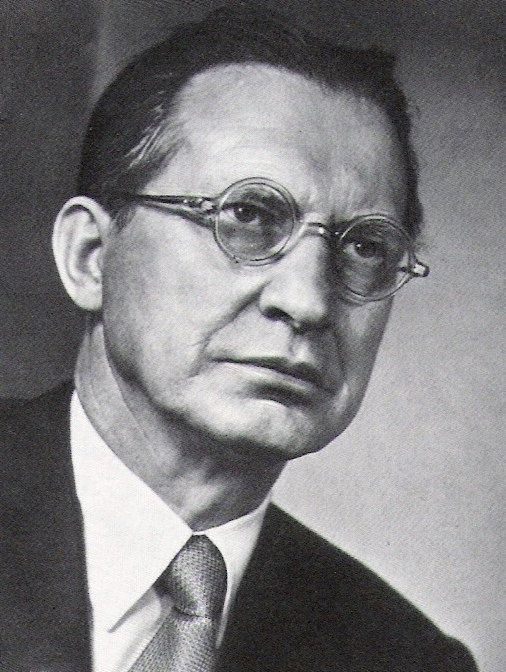

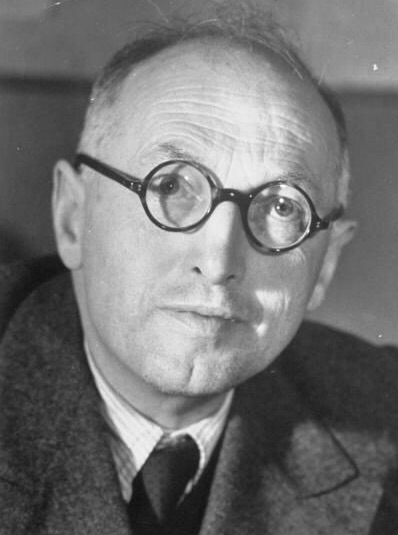

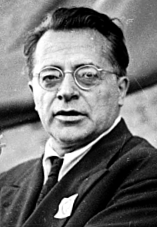

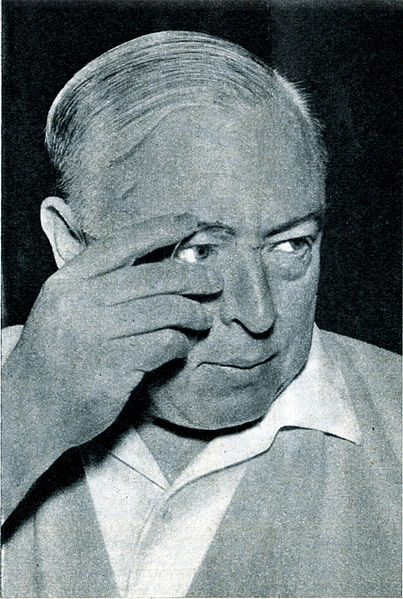

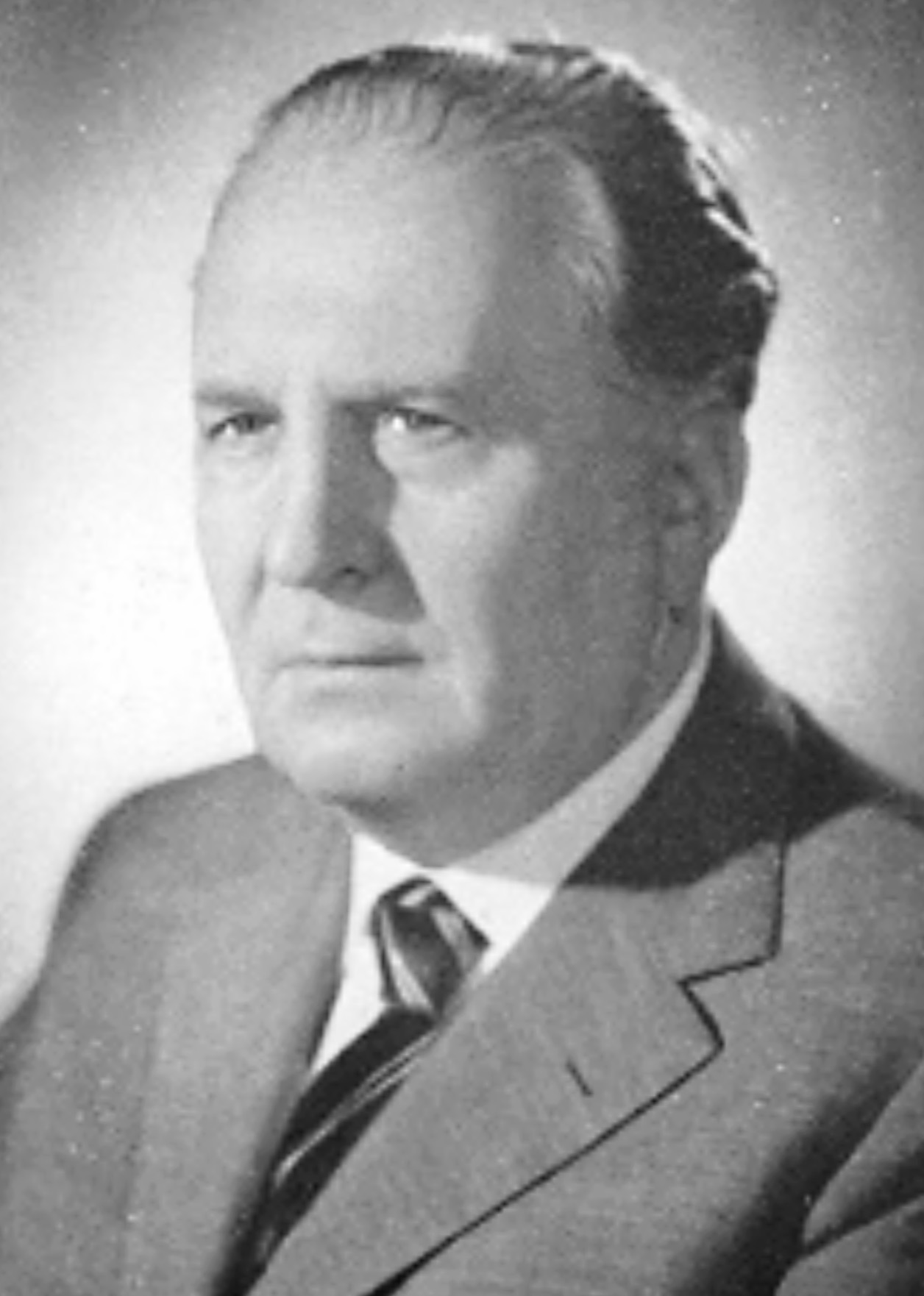
	Majority party	Minority party	Third party
Leader	Alcide De Gasperi	Pietro Nenni	Palmiro Togliatti
Party	DC	PSIUP	PCI
Leader's seat	Trento	Whole Italy	Whole Italy
Seats won	207	115	104
Popular vote	8,101,004	4,758,129	4,356,686
Percentage	35.21%	20.68%	18.93%
	Fourth party	Fifth party	Sixth party
Leader	Collective leadership	Guglielmo Giannini	Randolfo Pacciardi
Party	UDN	FUQ	PRI
Leader's seat	N/A	Rome	Pisa
Seats won	41	30	23
Popular vote	1,560,638	1,211,956	1,003,007
Percentage	6.78%	5.27%	4.36%
- On the left, results of the election by province. On the right, the seat distribution by constituency.
Prime Minister before election
Alcide De Gasperi
DC
Prime Minister after the election
Alcide De Gasperi
DC

General elections were held in Italy on Sunday 2 and also on Monday 3 June (but until noon) 1946. They were the first after World War II and elected 556 deputies to the Constituent Assembly. Theoretically, a total of 573 deputies were to be elected, but the election did not take place in the Julian March and in South Tyrol, which were under military occupation by the United Nations.

For the first time, Italian women were allowed to vote in a national election and run for a seat in the Constituent Assembly.

This election was held concurrently with the 1946 Italian institutional referendum on the abolition of the monarchy.

== Electoral system ==
To emphasise the restoration of democracy after the fascist era, a pure party-list proportional representation was chosen. Italian provinces were united in 31 constituencies, each electing a group of candidates. At constituency level, seats were divided between open lists using the largest remainder method with the Imperiali quota. Remaining votes and seats were transferred at national level, where special closed lists of national leaders received the last seats using the Hare quota.

== Campaign ==
At the end of World War II, Italy was governed under transitional laws as a result of agreements between the National Liberation Committee (CLN) and the royal Lieutenant General of the Realm Umberto II of Italy. As no democratic elections had taken place for more than 20 years, legislative power was given to the government but, after the first election, the Italian Council of Ministers would have to receive a vote of confidence by the new Constituent Assembly.

The three main contestants were Christian Democracy and the Italian Socialist Party, which had both received popular support before the fascist era, and the Italian Communist Party, which had strengthened itself with the armed struggle against Nazism and fascism during the war. The Italian Liberal Party, heir of the pre-fascist and conservative ruling class, proposed an alliance called National Democratic Union. Monarchists groups created the National Bloc of Freedom, while the liberal socialist Action Party and Labour Democratic Party hoped to maximize the positive image of the governments that they ruled in the National Liberation Committee.

== Parties and leaders ==
Party	Ideology	Leader
Christian Democracy (DC)	Christian democracy	Alcide De Gasperi
Italian Socialist Party of Proletarian Unity (PSIUP)	Socialism	Pietro Nenni
Italian Communist Party (PCI)	Communism	Palmiro Togliatti
National Democratic Union (UDN)	Liberalism	Collective leadership
Common Man's Front (FUQ)	Populism	Guglielmo Giannini
Italian Republican Party (PRI)	Republicanism	Randolfo Pacciardi
National Bloc of Freedom (BNL)	Monarchism	Alfredo Covelli, Roberto Lucifero d'Aprigliano
Action Party (PdA)	Liberal socialism	Riccardo Lombardi

== Results ==
The election gave a large majority to the government formed by the three leaders of the CLN, which was briefly joined by the Republican Party after the exile of Umberto II. The alliance lasted for a year.

Party	Votes	%	Seats
Christian Democracy	8,101,004	35.21	207
Italian Socialist Party of Proletarian Unity	4,758,129	20.68	115
Italian Communist Party	4,356,686	18.93	104
National Democratic Union	1,560,638	6.78	41
Common Man's Front	1,211,956	5.27	30
Italian Republican Party	1,003,007	4.36	23
National Bloc of Freedom	637,328	2.77	16
Action Party	334,748	1.45	7
Movement for the Independence of Sicily	171,201	0.74	4
Peasants' Party of Italy	102,393	0.44	1
Republican Democratic Concentration	97,690	0.42	2
Sardinian Action Party	78,554	0.34	2
Italian Unionist Movement	71,021	0.31	1
Social Christian Party	51,088	0.22	1
Labour Democratic Party	40,633	0.18	1
National Reconstruction Movement	39,748	0.17	0
Independent Democratic Union of Labour	36,398	0.16	0
Italian Republican Alliance	34,363	0.15	0
Italian Monarchical Alliance	30,505	0.13	0
Italian Monarchical Democratic Movement	30,017	0.13	0
Party of the Italian Veteran	24,764	0.11	0
Internationalist Communist Party	22,644	0.10	0
Republican Progressive Democratic Front (Note: Alliance between PSIUP, PCI, PRI and Action Party in Aosta Valley. The election happened in a single-member constituency with the first-past-the-post method, with candidate Giulio Bordon winning 51.79% of valid votes.)	21,853	0.09	1
National Concentration of Combatants and Veterans	21,570	0.09	0
Union of Combatants, Partisans, Veterans and Prisoner Families	14,383	0.06	0
National Union Party	12,746	0.06	0
Fighters and Independents Group	12,165	0.05	0
Patriotic Monarchist Renewing Party	11,098	0.05	0
Sardinian League	10,499	0.05	0
Sicilian Independent Labour Party	10,246	0.04	0
National War Victims Union	10,236	0.04	0
Veterans Partisans	8,690	0.04	0
Independent Workers Movement	8,596	0.04	0
Italian Pacifist League	6,333	0.03	0
Independent Sicilians of the Left	5,706	0.02	0
Union for the Renaissance of the South	5,373	0.02	0
Italian Political Centre	5,063	0.02	0
Italian Centre	4,516	0.02	0
UDLLIDIM	4,207	0.02	0
Italian Liberal Party	4,052	0.02	0
Italian Labour Party	3,891	0.02	0
Socialist Republican Party	3,611	0.02	0
National Deployment	2,781	0.01	0
Socialist Reformist Party	2,234	0.01	0
Political Group of Italians from Sicily, Africa and the Mediterranean	1,995	0.01	0
Garibaldian Antifascist Partisan Movement of Italy	1,922	0.01	0
Independent Internationalist Communist Union	1,776	0.01	0
Young Italy	985	0.00	0
Italian Progressive Party	780	0.00	0
Autonomous Republican Party	683	0.00	0
General Confederation of Italian Feminists for Work	662	0.00	0
Independents	17,312	0.08	0
Total	23,010,479	100.00	556
Valid votes	23,010,479	92.24	
Invalid/blank votes	1,936,708	7.76	
Total votes	24,947,187	100.00	
Registered voters/turnout	28,005,449	89.08	
Source: Ministry of Interior

Popular vote
DC	35.21%
PSIUP	20.68%
PCI	18.93%
UDN	6.78%
FUQ	5.27%
PRI	4.36%
BNL	2.77%
PdA	1.45%
Others	4.53%

Parliamentary seats
DC	37.23%
PSIUP	20.68%
PCI	18.71%
UDN	7.37%
FUQ	5.40%
PRI	4.14%
BNL	2.88%
PdA	1.26%
Others	2.34%

=== By constituency ===
Constituency	Total seats	Seats won								
Constituency	Total seats	DC	PSIUP	PCI	UDN	FUQ	PRI	BNL	PdA	Others
Turin	25	9	9	6	1					
Cuneo	16	7	4	3	1					1
Genoa	16	6	5	5						
Milan	34	12	12	9		1				
Como	12	6	5	1						
Brescia	15	9	4	2						
Mantua	8	3	3	2						
Trentino	4	3	1							
Verona	27	15	8	4						
Venice	13	7	4	2						
Udine	11	6	4	1						
Bologna	22	4	7	9			2			
Parma	19	6	6	7						
Florence	12	4	3	5						
Pisa	13	5	3	4			1			
Siena	8	2	2	4						
Ancona	13	5	3	3			2			
Perugia	9	3	2	3			1			
Rome	29	11	3	4	2	2	5	2		
L'Aquila	12	7	2	1	1		1			
Benevento	7	4			2	1				
Naples	27	11	2	2	6	4		2		
Avellino	12	4	1	1	3	1		1		1
Bari	18	7	2	4	1	4				
Lecce	12	5	1	1	2			3		
Potenza	5	2	1	1	1					
Catanzaro	21	8	2	3	3	2	1	2		
Catania	23	10	3	1	4	2		1		2
Palermo	21	8	3	2	3	2	1			2
Cagliari	11	6	1	1		1				2
Aosta Valley	1									1
National	80	12	9	13	11	10	9	5	7	4
Total	556	207	115	104	41	30	23	16	7	13

== Referendum ==
Together with the election, a constitutional referendum took place. Italian electors chose whether to continue the reign of Umberto II of Italy or turn Italy into a republic. While all regions of northern Italy as far as Tuscany and Marches gave a majority to the republic, all regions of southern Italy to Lazio and Abruzzo voted to maintain the monarchy.

Choice	Votes	%
Republic	12,717,923	54.26
Against	10,719,284	45.74
Total	23,437,207	100.00
Valid votes	23,437,207	93.99
Invalid/blank votes	1,498,136	6.01
Total votes	24,935,343	100.00
Registered voters/turnout	28,005,449	89.04
Source: Official Gazette
