= 1963 Italian general election =

- 28 April 1963

All 630 seats in the Chamber of Deputies 316 seats needed for a majority All 315 elective seats in the Senate 161 seats needed for a majority (Note: taking into account the Senators for life, which accounted for 6 seats at the time the election took place)
- Registered: 34,199,184 (C) · 31,019,23 (S)
- Turnout: 31,766,009 (C) · 92.9% (▼0.9 pp); 28,872,052 (S) · 93.1% (▼0.9 pp)
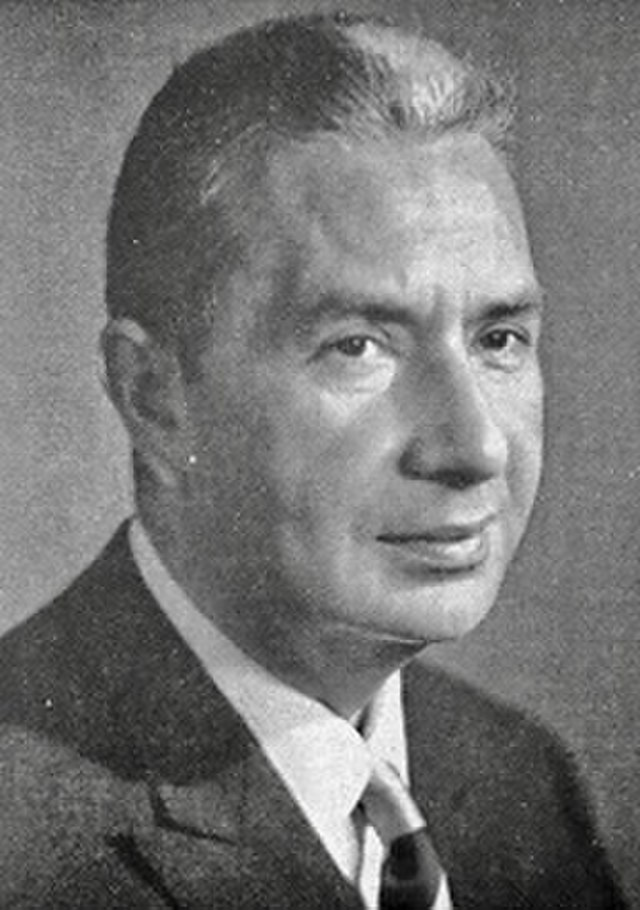

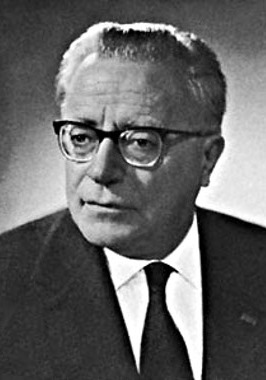

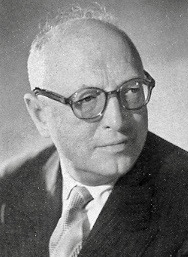

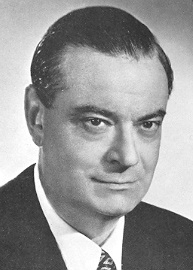

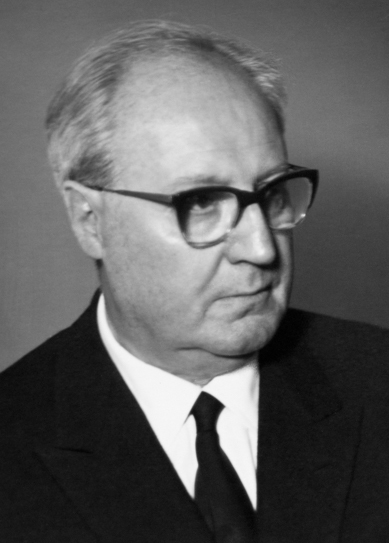

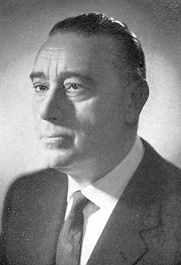
	Majority party	Minority party	Third party
Leader	Aldo Moro	Palmiro Togliatti	Pietro Nenni
Party	DC	PCI	PSI
Leader since	16 March 1959	15 May 1943 (Note: Togliatti also served as secretary of the Communist Party of Italy from 1926 to 1934 and from 1938 to 1943.)	16 May 1949 (Note: Nenni also served as secretary from 1933 to 1939 and from 1943 to 1945.)
Leader's seat	Bari (C)	Rome (S)	Milan (C)
Seats won	260 (C) / 129 (S)	166 (C) / 84 (S)	87 (C) / 44 (S)
Seat change	▼13 (C) / ▲6 (S)	▲26 (C) / ▲25 (S)	▲3 (C) / ▲9 (S)
Popular vote	11,773,182 (C); 10,017,975 (S)	7,767,601 (C); 6,461,616 (S)	4,255,836 (C); 3,849,440 (S)
Percentage	38.3% (C); 36.5% (S)	25.3% (C); 23.5% (S)	13.8% (C); 14.0% (S)
Swing	▼4.1 pp (C) ▼4.7 pp (S)	▲2.6 pp (C) ▲1.7 pp (S)	▼0.4 pp (C) ▼0.1 pp (S)
	Fourth party	Fifth party	Sixth party
Leader	Giovanni Malagodi	Giuseppe Saragat	Arturo Michelini
Party	PLI	PSDI	MSI
Leader since	4 April 1954	11 April 1957 (Note: Saragat also served as secretary from 1949 to 1952 and from 1952 to 1954.)	10 October 1954
Leader's seat	Milan (C)	Turin (C)	Rome (C)
Seats won	39 (C) / 18 (S)	33 (C) / 14 (S)	27 (C) / 14 (S)
Seat change	▲22 (C) / ▲14 (S)	▲11 (C) / ▲9 (S)	▲3 (C) / ▲6 (S)
Popular vote	2,144,270 (C); 2,043,323 (S)	1,876,271 (C); 1,743,870 (S)	1,570,282 (C); 1,458,917 (S)
Percentage	7.0% (C); 7.4% (S)	6.1% (C); 6.4% (S)	5.1% (C); 5.3% (S)
Swing	▲3.5 pp (C) ▲3.5 pp (S)	▲1.5 pp (C) ▲1.9 pp (S)	▲0.3 pp (C) ▲0.9 pp (S)
Prime Minister before election
Amintore Fanfani
DC
Prime Minister after the election
Giovanni Leone
DC

The 1963 Italian general election was held in Italy on 28 April 1963. It was the first election with a fixed number of MPs to be elected, as decided by the second Constitutional Reform in February 1963. It was also the first election which saw the Secretary of Christian Democracy to refuse the office of Prime Minister after the vote, at least for six months, preferring to provisionally maintain his more influent post at the head of the party: this fact confirmed the transformation of Italian political system into a particracy, the secretaries of the parties having become more powerful than the Parliament and the Government.

== Electoral system ==
The pure party-list proportional representation had traditionally become the electoral system for the Chamber of Deputies. Italian provinces were united in 32 constituencies, each electing a group of candidates. At constituency level, seats were divided between open lists using the largest remainder method with Imperiali quota. Remaining votes and seats were transferred at a national level, where they were divided using the Hare quota, and automatically distributed to best losers into the local lists.

For the Senate, 237 single-seat constituencies were established, even if the assembly had risen to 315 members. The candidates needed a landslide victory of two-thirds of votes to be elected, a goal which could be reached only by the German minorities in South Tirol. All remained votes and seats were grouped in party lists and regional constituencies, where a D'Hondt method was used: inside the lists, candidates with the best percentages were elected.

== Historical background ==
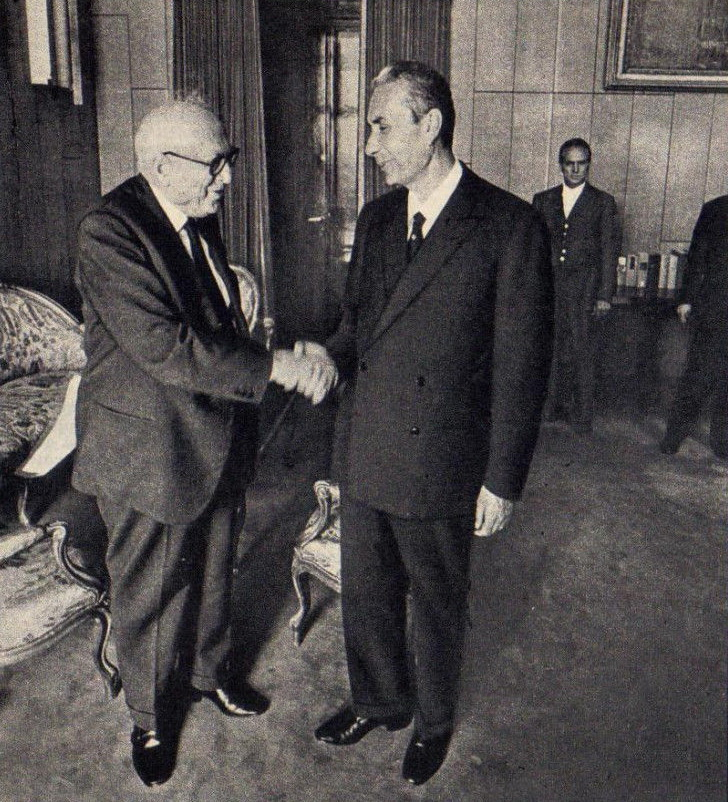
The DC's leader Aldo Moro with the PSI's one Pietro Nenni.

During the First Republic, the Christian Democracy slowly but steadily lost support, as society modernised and the traditional values at its ideological core became less appealing to the population. Various options of extending the parliamentary majority were considered, mainly an opening to the left (apertura a sinistra), i.e. to the Socialist party (PSI), which after the 1956 events in Hungary had moved from a position of total subordination to the Communists, to an independent position. Proponents of such a coalition proposed a series much-needed "structural reforms" that would modernize the country and create a modern social-democracy. In 1960, an attempt by the right wing of the Christian Democrats to incorporate the neo-fascist Italian Social Movement (MSI) in the Tambroni government led to violent and bloody riots (Genoa, Reggio Emilia), and was defeated.

Up until the Nineties, two types of governmental coalitions characterised the politics of post-war Italy. The first were “centrist” coalitions led by the Christian Democracy party together with smaller parties: the Social Democratic Party, the Republican Party, and the Liberal Party. The first democratic government (1947) excluded both communists and the socialists, which brought about the political period known as “centrist government,” which ruled over Italian politics from 1948 to 1963. The centre-left coalition (DC-PRI-PSDI-PSI) was the second type of coalition that characterised Italian politics, coming about in 1963 when the PSI (formerly the opposition party) went into government with the DC. This coalition lasted in parliament first for 12 years (from 1964 to 1976) and then with a revival in the Eighties that lasted until the start of the Nineties.

The Socialist Party entered government in 1963. During the first year of the new centre-left government, a wide range of measures were carried out which went some way towards the Socialist Party's requirements for governing in coalition with the Christian Democrats. These included taxation of real estate profits and of share dividends (designed to curb speculation), increases in pensions for various categories of workers, a law on school organisation (to provide for a unified secondary school with compulsory attendance up to the age of 14), the nationalisation of the electric-power industry, and significant wage rises for workers (including those in the newly nationalised electric-power industry), which led to a rise in consumer demand. Urged on by the PSI, the government also made brave attempts to tackle issues relating to welfare services, hospitals, the agrarian structure, urban development, education, and overall planning. For instance, during the Centre-Left Government's time in office, social security was extended to previously uncovered categories of the population. In addition, entrance to university by examination was abolished in 1965. Despite these important reforms, however, the reformist drive was soon lost, and the most important problems (including the mafia, social inequalities, inefficient state/social services, North/South imbalance) remained largely untackled.

== Parties and leaders ==
Party	Ideology	Leader	Seats in 1958		
Party	Ideology	Leader	C	S	Total
Christian Democracy (DC)	Christian democracy	Aldo Moro	273	123	396
Italian Communist Party (PCI)	Communism	Palmiro Togliatti	140	60	200
Italian Socialist Party (PSI)	Democratic socialism	Pietro Nenni	84	36	120
Italian Democratic Party of Monarchist Unity (PDIUM)	Monarchism	Alfredo Covelli	25	7	32
Italian Social Movement (MSI)	Neo-fascism	Arturo Michelini	24	8	32
Italian Democratic Socialist Party (PSDI)	Social democracy	Giuseppe Saragat	22	5	27
Italian Liberal Party (PLI)	Conservative liberalism	Giovanni Malagodi	17	4	21
Italian Republican Party (PRI)	Liberalism	Oronzo Reale	6	0	6

== Results ==
The election fell after the launch of the centre-left formula by the Christian Democracy, a coalition based upon the alliance with the Socialist Party which had left its alignment with the Soviet Union. Some rightist electors abandoned the DC for the Liberal Party, which was asking for a centre-right government and received votes also from the quarrelsome monarchist area. The majority party so decided to replace incumbent Premier Amintore Fanfani with a provisional administration led by impartial Speaker of the House, Giovanni Leone; however, when the congress of the PSI in autumn authorized a full engagement of the party into the government, Leone resigned and Aldo Moro, secretary of the DC and leader of the more leftist wing of the party, became the new Prime Minister and ruled Italy for more than four years, ever passing through two resolved political crisis caused even by the detachment of the left wing of the PSI, which created the PSIUP and returned to the alliance with the Communists, and by disagreements into the governmental coalition.

=== Chamber of Deputies ===
Party	Votes	%	Seats	+/–
Christian Democracy	11,773,182	38.28	260	−13
Italian Communist Party	7,767,601	25.26	166	+16
Italian Socialist Party	4,255,836	13.84	87	+3
Italian Liberal Party	2,144,270	6.97	39	+22
Italian Democratic Socialist Party	1,876,271	6.10	33	+11
Italian Social Movement	1,570,282	5.11	27	+3
Italian Democratic Party of Monarchist Unity	536,948	1.75	8	−17
Italian Republican Party	420,213	1.37	6	0
South Tyrolean People's Party	135,457	0.44	3	0
Concentration of Rural Unity	92,209	0.30	0	0
Autonomous Party of Italy's Pensioners	87,655	0.29	0	New
Valdostan Union	31,844	0.10	1	0
Italian Combatant Movement–National Rebirth Front	19,902	0.06	0	New
Italian Catholic Political Movement	7,220	0.02	0	New
Christian Social Party	6,873	0.02	0	New
National Monarchist Party	6,472	0.02	0	New
Slovene Unified List	5,679	0.02	0	New
Movement for the Independence of the Free Territory of Trieste	4,261	0.01	0	New
National Union of Public Health	2,926	0.01	0	New
Farmers and Employees Movement	2,685	0.01	0	New
Social Renewal	1,750	0.01	0	New
Italian Popular Movement	1,621	0.01	0	New
National Vanguard	959	0.00	0	New
Italian Labour Party	755	0.00	0	New
Total	30,752,871	100.00	630	+34
Valid votes	30,752,871	96.81		
Invalid/blank votes	1,013,138	3.19		
Total votes	31,766,009	100.00		
Registered voters/turnout	34,199,184	92.89		
Source: Ministry of the Interior

Popular vote
DC	38.28%
PCI	25.26%
PSI	13.84%
PLI	6.97%
PSDI	6.10%
MSI	5.11%
PDIUM	1.75%
PRI	1.37%
Others	1.33%

Seats
DC	41.27%
PCI	26.35%
PSI	13.81%
PLI	6.19%
PSDI	5.24%
MSI	4.29%
PDIUM	1.27%
PRI	0.95%
Others	0.63%

==== Results by constituency ====
Constituency	Total seats	Seats won								
Constituency	Total seats	DC	PCI	PSI	PLI	PSDI	MSI	PDIUM	PRI	Others
Turin	33	11	9	5	4	3	1			
Cuneo	14	7	3	2	1	1				
Genoa	23	8	7	3	2	2	1			
Milan	45	15	11	9	5	3	2			
Como	17	9	2	4	1	1				
Brescia	19	12	2	3	1	1				
Mantua	9	4	3	2						
Trentino	10	5	1	1						3
Verona	29	17	4	4	2	1	1			
Venice	17	9	3	3	1	1				
Udine	14	7	2	2	1	2				
Bologna	27	6	12	4	1	2	1		1	
Parma	19	6	8	3	1	1				
Florence	16	5	7	2	1	1				
Pisa	15	5	5	3		1			1	
Siena	10	3	5	2						
Ancona	19	7	6	2	1	1	1		1	
Perugia	12	4	5	2			1			
Rome	48	16	12	6	4	3	5	1	1	
L'Aquila	16	7	4	2	1	1	1			
Campobasso	4	3	1							
Naples	38	15	10	4	2	2	2	3		
Benevento	21	10	4	2	1	2	1	1		
Bari	23	10	7	3	1	1	1			
Lecce	18	9	4	2	1		2			
Potenza	8	4	3	1						
Catanzaro	26	12	7	3	1	1	2			
Catania	29	12	7	3	3	1	2	1		
Palermo	29	12	7	3	2	1	2	1	1	
Cagliari	18	8	4	2	1		1	1	1	
Aosta Valley	1									1
Trieste	3	2	1							
Total	630	260	166	87	39	33	27	8	6	4

=== Senate of the Republic ===
Party	Votes	%	Seats	+/–
Christian Democracy	10,017,975	36.47	129	+6
Italian Communist Party	6,933,310	25.24	84	+25
Italian Socialist Party	3,849,495	14.01	44	+9
Italian Liberal Party	2,043,323	7.44	18	+14
Italian Democratic Socialist Party	1,743,870	6.35	14	+9
Italian Social Movement	1,458,917	5.31	14	+6
Italian Democratic Party of Monarchist Unity	429,412	1.56	2	−5
Italian Republican Party	223,350	0.81	0	0
MSI – PDIUM	212,381	0.77	1	+1
DC – PRI	199,805	0.73	4	0
South Tyrolean People's Party	112,023	0.41	2	0
Concentration of Rural Unity	58,064	0.21	0	New
Social Christian Autonomist Party	43,355	0.16	1	New
Sardinian Action Party	34,954	0.13	0	0
Valdostan Union	29,510	0.11	1	+1
Right-wing independents	24,772	0.09	0	New
Catholic independents	22,578	0.08	1	+1
Left-wing independents	15,224	0.06	0	–1
Social Christian Sicilian Union	13,187	0.05	0	New
Combatant Peasants	3,797	0.01	0	New
Total	27,469,302	100.00	315	+69
Valid votes	27,469,302	92.36		
Invalid/blank votes	2,273,406	7.64		
Total votes	29,742,708	100.00		
Registered voters/turnout	31,019,233	95.88		
Source: Ministry of the Interior

Popular vote
DC	36.47%
PCI	25.24%
PSI	14.01%
PLI	7.44%
PSDI	6.35%
MSI	5.31%
PDIUM	1.56%
Others	3.62%

Seats
DC	40.95%
PCI	26.67%
PSI	13.97%
PLI	5.71%
PSDI	4.44%
MSI	4.44%
PDIUM	0.63%
Others	3.17%

==== Results by constituency ====
Constituency	Total seats	Seats won							
Constituency	Total seats	DC	PCI	PSI	PLI	PSDI	MSI	PDIUM	Others
Piedmont	24	9	6	4	3	2			
Aosta Valley	1								1
Lombardy	45	19	10	8	4	3	1		
Trentino-Alto Adige	7	4		1					2
Veneto	23	14	3	4	1	1			
Friuli-Venezia Giulia	7	4	1	1		1			
Liguria	11	4	3	2	1	1			
Emilia-Romagna	22	3	10	3	1	1			4
Tuscany	20	6	8	3	1	1	1		
Umbria	7	3	3	1					
Marche	8	4	3	1					
Lazio	24	8	7	3	2	1	3		
Abruzzo and Molise	9	5	2	1			1		
Campania	29	11	8	3	2	1	2	1	1
Apulia	21	10	6	2		1	2		
Basilicata	7	4	2	1					
Calabria	12	5	4	2			1		
Sicily	29	11	6	3	3	1	3	1	1
Sardinia	9	5	2	1					1
Total	315	129	84	44	18	14	14	2	10
