= Popular Democratic Front (Italy) =

Left-wing political coalition in Italy from 1947 to 1948

Popular Democratic Front Fronte Democratico Popolare
- Leaders: Palmiro Togliatti; Pietro Nenni
- Founded: 28 December 1947
- Dissolved: 18 April 1948
- Ideology: Frontism; Anti-fascism; Socialism; Factions: Communism; Marxism; Democratic socialism Catholic communism Republicanism
- Political position: Left-wing
- Colours: Red

The Popular Democratic Front (Italian: Fronte Democratico Popolare), shortened name of the Popular Democratic Front for Freedom, Peace, Labour (Italian: Fronte Democratico Popolare per la libertà, la pace, il lavoro), was a left-wing political coalition in Italy. Formed in December 1947 by the Italian Socialist Party (PSI) and the Italian Communist Party (PCI), it contested the 1948 Italian general election.

== History ==
The coalition was formed for the 1948 general election and consisted of the PSI and PCI. Its symbol was a green star surmounted by an image of Italian unification hero Giuseppe Garibaldi. The Social Christian Party (PCS) and Sardinian Action Party (PSd'Az) were not allied with the coalition and formed their own electoral lists. The right-wing of the PSI opposed the coalition, left the party, and organized a separate list as Socialist Unity; this group later became the Italian Democratic Socialist Party (PSDI).

The election of 1948 was perhaps the most important in the history of the Italian Republic, as the choice of future alliance with the United States or with the Soviet Union was at issue. The coalition got 31.0% of the vote for Italy's Chamber of Deputies and 30.8% of the country's Senate of the Republic vote.

Following the victory of Christian Democracy (DC) with 48.5%, Italy became a founding member of NATO in 1949. After the electoral defeat, while the PCI and PSI remained allies at the national level until 1956 and would govern together at the local level into the 1990s, the coalition was dissolved. Despite the loss, the PCI established itself as the main opposition to the DC and went on to become the largest Communist party in Western Europe.

== Composition ==
Party	Ideology	Leader
Italian Communist Party (PCI)	Communism	Palmiro Togliatti
Italian Socialist Party (PSI)	Socialism	Pietro Nenni
Christian Movement for Peace	Catholic communism	Guido Miglioli
Italian Social Republican Party (PRIS)	Republicanism	Guido Bergamo

== Election results ==
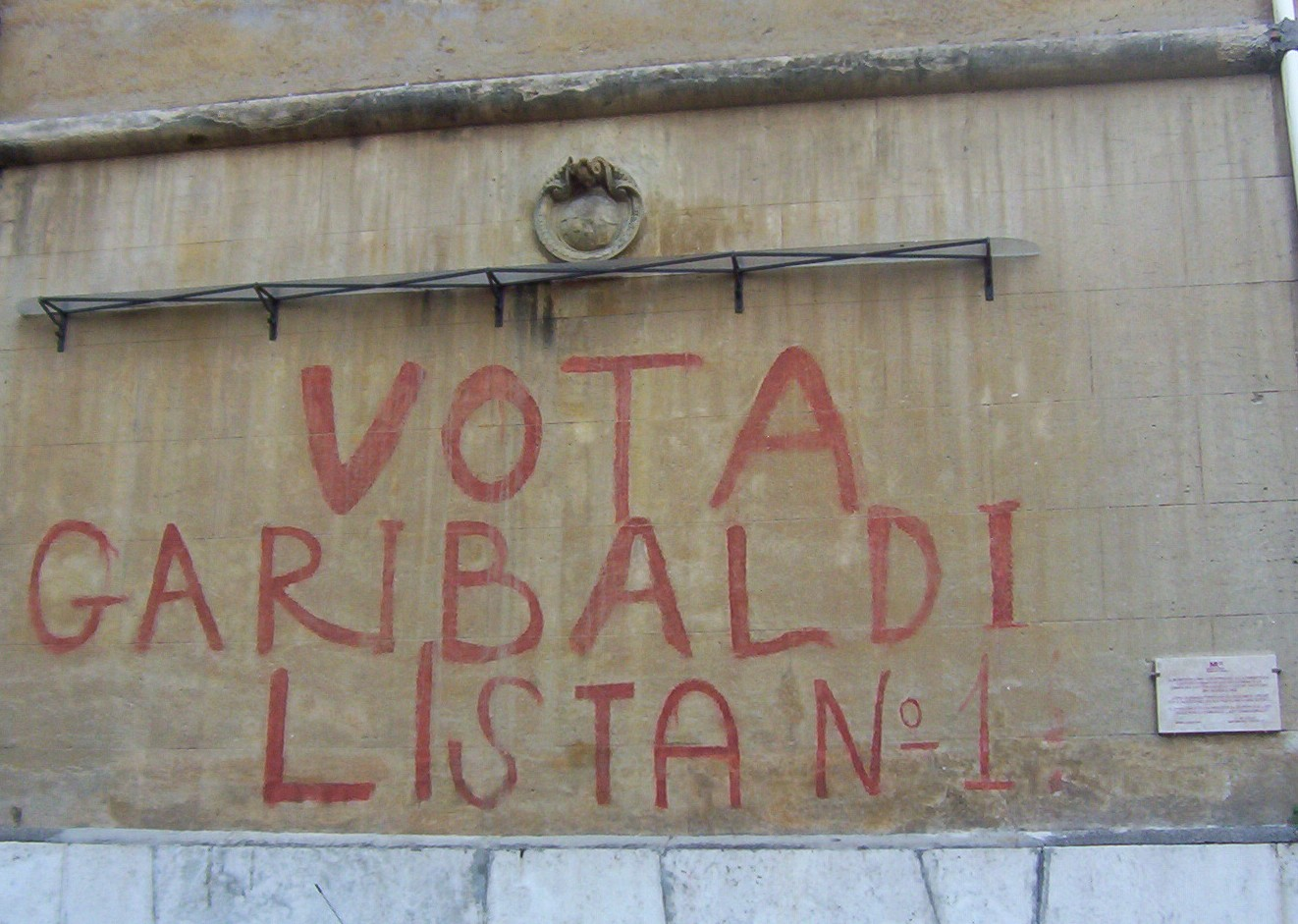
Restored 1948 graffito in Rome's Garbatella neighbourhood calling to vote for the Popular Democratic Front

Chamber of Deputies
Election year	Votes	%	Seats	+/−	Leader
1948	8,136,637 (2nd)	31.0	183 / 574	–	Palmiro Togliatti; Pietro Nenni

Senate of the Republic
Election year	Votes	%	Seats	+/−	Leader
1948	6,969,122 (2nd)	30.8	72 / 237	–	Palmiro Togliatti; Pietro Nenni
