= National Democracy (Italy) =

National Democracy Democrazia Nazionale
- Leader: Alfredo Covelli
- Founded: 20 January 1977
- Dissolved: 16 December 1979
- Split from: Italian Social Movement
- Ideology: National conservatism; Post-fascism
- Political position: Right-wing

The National Democracy (Democrazia Nazionale, DN) party was a spin-off of the Italian Social Movement, after the electoral defeat of 1976. It was born to pursue an agreement with the Christian Democracy, by moving from the neo-fascist ideology of the Italian Social Movement to a post-fascist moderate ideology.

The movement became a fully fledged party in February 1977 and ceased to exist in December 1979 after the very poor result of the 1979 election (0.6%).

== Leadership ==
- Secretary: Ernesto De Marzio (1976–1978), Raffaele Delfino (1978–1979), Pietro Cerullo (1979)
- President: Alfredo Covelli (1977–1979)

== Electoral results ==
Election	Leader	Votes	%	Seats	Position	Status	Ref
1979	Alfredo Covelli	229,205	0.63	0 / 630	11th	Extra-parliamentary	
