= National Democratic Union (Italy) =

National Democratic Union Unione Democratica Nazionale
- Leader: Benedetto Croce, Ivanoe Bonomi, Francesco Saverio Nitti, Vittorio Emanuele Orlando
- Founded: 1946
- Ideology: Liberalism; Monarchism
- Political position: Big tent

The National Democratic Union (Italian: Unione Democratica Nazionale, UDN) was a political alliance of parties for the 1946 Italian general election, formed by the Italian Liberal Party, the Labour Democratic Party, and some other liberal, conservative, and monarchist clubs. Its symbol was an Italian flag overcome by a shining star.

== History ==
The party scored 6.8%, placing itself at the fourth place in the election. This grouping, during the sessions of the Constituent Assembly, represented the continuation of the Liberal elite, which governed Italy from the years of Giovanni Giolitti until the rise of Benito Mussolini and the instauration of the Italian fascist regime. Important politicians elected on the UDN lists were Vittorio Emanuele Orlando, Francesco Saverio Nitti, Luigi Einaudi, Benedetto Croce, Enrico De Nicola, Gaetano Martino, Giuseppe Paratore, Ivanoe Bonomi, Raffaele De Caro, Meuccio Ruini, Enrico Molè, Bruno Villabruna, Epicarmo Corbino, and Aldo Bozzi. The alliance was succeeded in the 1948 Italian general election by the National Bloc.

== Composition ==
Party	Ideology	Leader	Deputies
Italian Liberal Party (PLI)	Conservative liberalism	Manlio Brosio	
Labour Democratic Party (DL)	Social democracy	Ivanoe Bonomi	8 out of 13

== Electoral results ==
Election	Leader	Votes	%	Seats	Position	Status
1946	Several leaders	1,560,638	6.78	41 / 556	4th	Opposition

== See also ==
- National Democratic Union (Brazil)
