= Common Man's Front =

Common Man's Front Fronte dell'Uomo Qualunque
- Leader: Guglielmo Giannini
- Founded: February 16, 1946
- Dissolved: 1949
- Newspaper: L'Uomo Qualunque
- Ideology: Populism; Anti-communism
- Political position: Right-wing
- National affiliation: National Bloc (1948–49)
- Colours: Blue

The Common Man's Front (Italian: Fronte dell'Uomo Qualunque, FUQ), also translated as Front of the Ordinary Man, was a short-lived right-wing populist, and anti-communist political party in Italy. It was formed shortly after the end of the Second World War and participated in the first post-war election for the constituent assembly in 1946. Its leader was the Roman writer Guglielmo Giannini, and its symbol was the banner of Giannini's newspaper L'Uomo qualunque ("The Common Man").

== Position and structure ==
The Common Man's front opposed the broad alliance of anti-fascist parties united in the National Liberation Committee (CLN) and ranging from the Communists to the Christian Democrats as well as the occupation by the Allies. Its leader, Guglielmo Giannini, found the difference between the disempowered fascists and the new rulers of the anti-fascist parties in the CLN to be negligible. For him, both camps were interested in abstract ideologies and social engineering, rather than the actual needs of the ordinary people. His newspaper attacked and ridiculed politicians of all democratic and anti-fascist parties.

After the fascist totalitarianism in which politics dominated all aspects of the society, the party promoted an apolitical position. It mainly attracted voters from the middle classes, especially in Southern Italy, who were tired of politics and ideologies. Moreover, it appealed to southern peasants.

In parts, it was a vehicle for its financial backers who were established southern dignitaries and ex-fascists who had not been admitted to the Italian Liberal Party. The party rejected the partial and ineffective cleansing of the public service of former fascists, which they perceived as unfair because important persons and institutions were spared though they had been compromised with the old regime. The success of the party reflected many Italians' refusal to think about the rise and resilience of fascism and to accept their responsibility. It could benefit from the southerners' long-established dislike of the central government and the twenty years of political disinformation by the Fascists. In the constitutional referendum of 1946, it advocated to maintain the monarchy, but the majority of voters opted for the establishment of a republic.

The party presented itself as an anti-party movement. It was characterised by a very loose structure based only on highly autonomous local committees, the Friends of the Common Man. Its political enemies accused the party to be a hiding place for former fascists. Although Giannini himself was not a fascist, the grassroots anti-hierarchical organization of the party allowed the infiltration of many former fascists into its structure.

== Establishment and development ==
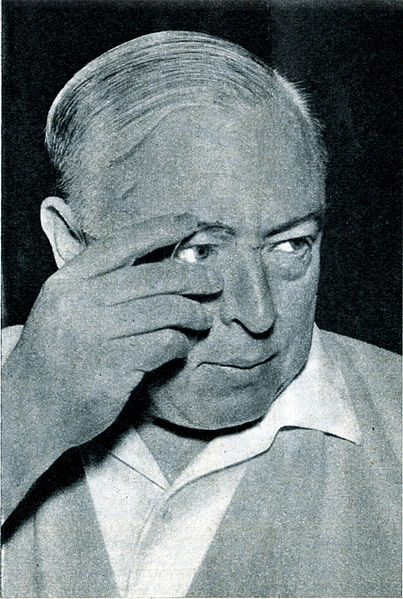
Guglielmo Giannini in 1955

Giannini founded his journal in late 1944, after the liberation of Rome by the Allies. By May 1945 it was sold in more than 850 thousands copies, a huge number for that time. The newspaper was directed against the political class in general, which was accused of oppressing the average man. One of the slogans of the journal was Abbasso tutti! or "Down with everyone!".

By 1946, many local committees were formed around the journal platform, mostly in central and northern Italy and in Sicily. Giannini organized those committees in a loose party structure and consciously differentiated itself from the rigid hierarchical system of the mass parties that dominated the Italian politics at the time. The party had a minimal program but left the strategic decision about party politics to be decided by the local committees themselves.

The party opposed both the professionalization of politics and ideological politics. It demanded a purely administrative type of politics, led by clerks who would be directly accountable to the voters. It demanded a minimal state and opposed state interventionism in social matters. It was characterized by anti-communism, anti-statism and populism.

In the 1946 general election, the party took 4.4% (more than a million votes) and 30 members of the Italian Constituent Assembly. It gained considerable support in southern Italy. In particular, it was the most voted party in the provincial capitals of Campobasso (38.59%), Matera (37.43%), Bari (36.86%) and Caltanissetta (32.40%). In Palermo, the party received 22.88% of the vote and in Naples 19.12%. It also did quite well in Sardinian major cities (although coming second after DC), getting 33.12% in Alghero, 28.4% in Sassari and 27.61% in Cagliari. In August 1946 a group of dissatisfied former partisans and auxiliary police revolted in Piedmont and demanded, amongst other things, the ban of the Common Man's Front. In the local elections of November 1946, the party was successful, particularly in Rome. The achievement was at the expense of the Christian Democracy (DC) and partly because of the endorsement by a number of Catholic priests, who were sceptical that the DC would sufficiently enforce the interests of the Church.

Afterwards, the party suffered for its light structure. After the Christian Democracy ejected the Communists from the government coalition in 1947 and the stabilisation of the economic situation, most of the party's supporters became voters of the Christian Democrats, which made them the dominant force in Italian politics. In 1947 ten MPs left the party founding the National Union group and slowly moved towards the Italian Liberal Party. Later, the whole party accepted to join forces with the Liberals in the National Bloc, and fell into decline. Some of its initial proponents became adherents of the post-fascist Italian Social Movement (MSI). The last remnants of the organisation merged into the MSI in 1972.

== Qualunquismo ==
Whereas the party's history was quite short, it left one long-lasting influence in the Italian political discourse; even today, qualunquismo is a common derogatory term for a non-committal attitude, cynical political disinterest, lack of social responsibility or anti-political populism.

Qualunquismo has been compared to the similar movement of Poujadism in France, named after Pierre Poujade, the leader of the middle-class populist and anti-establishment "Union for the Defence of Shopkeepers and Craftsmen" (UDCA) that had its peak in the mid-1950s.

== Electoral results ==
=== Italian Parliament ===
Chamber of Deputies
Election year	Votes	%	Seats	+/–	Leader
1946	1,211,956 (5th)	5.27	30 / 556		Guglielmo Giannini
1948	Into National Bloc	–	5 / 574	▼25	Guglielmo Giannini

Senate of the Republic
Election year	Votes	%	Seats	+/–	Leader
1948	Into National Bloc	–	1 / 237		Guglielmo Giannini

== Members ==
- Giuseppe Abozzi
- Giuseppe Ayroldi
- Antonio Capua
- Francesco Colitto
- Giuseppe De Falco
- Armando Fresa
- Guglielmo Giannini
- Ezio Coppa
- Ottavio Mastrojanni
- Ottavia Penna Buscemi
