= Monarchist National Party =

Monarchist National Party Partito Nazionale Monarchico
- Abbreviation: PNM
- Secretary: Alfredo Covelli
- Founded: 13 June 1946
- Dissolved: 11 April 1959; 67 years ago
- Preceded by: Italian Democratic Party
- Merged into: Democratic Party of Monarchist Unity
- Headquarters: Rome, Italy
- Ideology: Conservatism; Monarchism
- Political position: Right-wing
- Colours: Savoy blue

The Monarchist National Party (Italian: Partito Nazionale Monarchico, PNM) was a political party in Italy founded in 1946. It was a right-wing competitor to Christian Democracy and was especially strong in Southern Italy.

== History ==
The party's best electoral result was in the 1953 general election, when the party scored 6.9% and came fourth after Christian Democracy, the Italian Communist Party and the Italian Socialist Party.

In 1954 the party suffered a major split led by Achille Lauro, mayor of Naples from 1952 to 1957, who formed the People's Monarchist Party (PMP), which was closer to Christian Democracy. In the 1958 general election, the PNM won 2.2% of the vote, while the rival PMP 2.6%.

In 1959 the two monarchist parties joined the Italian Democratic Party (PDIUM).

== Electoral results ==
=== Italian Parliament ===
Chamber of Deputies
Election year	Votes	%	Seats	+/–	Leader
1948	729,078 (5th)	2.78	14 / 630	▼2	Alfredo Covelli
1953	1,854,850 (4th)	6.85	40 / 630	▲26	Alfredo Covelli
1958	659,997 (8th)	2.23	11 / 630	▼29	Alfredo Covelli

Senate of the Republic
Election year	Votes	%	Seats	+/–	Leader
1948	393,510 (5th)	1.74	3 / 315	–	Alfredo Covelli
1953	1,581,128 (4th)	6.51	14 / 315	▲11	Alfredo Covelli
1958	565,045 (8th)	2.16	2 / 315	▼12	Alfredo Covelli
