= People's Monarchist Party (Italy) =

People's Monarchist Party Partito Monarchico Popolare
- Secretary: Achille Lauro
- Founded: June 2, 1954
- Dissolved: March 7, 1959; 67 years ago
- Split from: National Monarchist Party
- Merged into: Italian Democratic Party
- Headquarters: Naples, Italy
- Ideology: Monarchism
- Colours: Blue

The People's Monarchist Party (Italian: Partito Monarchico Popolare, PMP) was an Italian conservative party founded in 1954 by a split from the National Monarchist Party. It was led by Achille Lauro, long-time Mayor of Naples. It took part in the 1958 election and won 14 seats to the Chamber of Deputies and 5 seats to the Senate.

In 1959, after this good result (2.6%, while the rival PNM scored just 2.2%), the party re-joined the National Monarchist Party to form the Italian Democratic Party, latterly named Italian Democratic Party of Monarchist Unity.

== Election results ==
=== Chamber of Deputies ===
Election	Votes	%	Seats	Leader
1958	776,919 (7th)	2.63	14 / 630	Achille Lauro

=== Senate ===
Election	Votes	%	Seats	Leader
1958	774,242 (7th)	2.16	5 / 315	Achille Lauro
