= Constituent Assembly of Italy =

Body that wrote the Italian constitution

Constituent Assembly Assemblea Costituente

Type
- Type: Unicameral

History
- Established: 25 June 1946
- Disbanded: 31 January 1948
- Preceded by: Parliament of the Kingdom of Italy
- Succeeded by: Parliament of the Italian Republic

Leadership
- President of the Assembly (1946–1947): Giuseppe Saragat, PSI
- President of the Assembly (1947–1948): Umberto Terracini, PCI

Structure
- Seats: 556
- Political groups: DC: 207; PSI: 115; PCI: 104; UDN: 41; UQ: 30; PRI: 23; BNL: 16; PdA: 7; MIS: 4; Others: 9 (Note: CDR: 2; PSd'Az: 2; PCd'I: 1; MUI: 1; PCS: 1; PDL: 1; FDPR: 1)

Elections
- Voting system: Proportional representation
- Last election: 2 and 3 June 1946

Meeting place
- Palazzo Montecitorio, Rome

The Italian Constituent Assembly (Italian: Assemblea Costituente della Repubblica Italiana) was a parliamentary chamber which existed in Italy from 25 June 1946 until 31 January 1948. It was tasked with writing a constitution for the Italian Republic, which had replaced the Kingdom of Italy after the 1946 Italian institutional referendum.

The assembly was formed by the representatives of all the anti-fascist forces that contributed to the defeat of Nazi and Fascist forces during the liberation of Italy.

== History ==
On 2 June 1946 the first free election since 1924, was held in Italy. The vote was allowed to all over 21, females being allowed to vote for the first time. Voters received both a ballot for the choice between Republic or Monarchy, and one for the election of the deputies of the new Constituent Assembly; the latter would have the task to write a new constitutional chart, as established by a decree of 16 March 1946.

The referendum was won by a move to a Republic with some 12.7 million votes, against 10.7 million favouring to continue being a monarchy. Umberto II, the last king of the country, left Italy on 13 June 1946. On 18 June 1946 the Corte di Cassazione proclaimed officially the victory of the Republic.

The election of the Constituent Assembly was based on a proportional system, based on 32 electoral regions. 573 deputies were to be elected, although the elections could not be held in South Tyrol, Trieste, Gorizia, Pola, Fiume and Zara, which were then under Allied or Yugoslav military control. Thus, 556 deputies were elected.

On 25 June 1946 the assembly was established, with Giuseppe Saragat (future president of the Republic) as president. Its first act, on 28 June, was the election of Enrico De Nicola as the Italian Republic's provisional president. On 504 voters, De Nicola (a member of the Italian Liberal Party) obtained 396 votes, followed by Cipriano Facchinetti (Italian Republican Party) with 40, Ottavia Penna Buscemi (Common Man's Front) with 32, Vittorio Emanuele Orlando (liberal) with 12, Carlo Sforza (PRI) with 2, Alcide De Gasperi and Alfredo Proja (both from Christian Democracy, or DC) with 2. Aside from the creation of the new constitution, the assembly was entrusted the approval of governments and of their budgets, and the ratification of the international treaties. The legislative function was formally assigned to the government, but, in virtue of the pre-Fascist tradition, the latter often assigned the emission of laws to the assembly.

The assembly elected among its members a Constitutional Commission of 75 deputies, with the task to write down the constitution's general layout. The commission was further divided into three sub-commissions:

- Rights and Obligations of the Citizens, chaired by Umberto Tupini (DC)
- Constitutional Organization of the State, chaired by Umberto Terracini (Italian Communist Party)
- Economical and Social Relationships, chaired by Gustavo Ghidini (Italian Socialist Party)

A more restricted committee (informally known as "Committee of the Eighteen") had the task to write the constitution in accordance with the work of the three sub-commissions. The Constitutional Commission ended its work on 12 January 1947 and on 4 March the assembly started its debate about the text. The final text of the Constitution of Italy was approved on 22 December 1947.

The Assembly was dissolved on 31 January 1948, replaced by the new Italian Parliament.

== Presidents ==
Portrait	Name (Birth–Death)	Term of office		Tenure (Years and days)	Political Party	Legislature
	Giuseppe Saragat (1898–1988)	25 June 1946	6 February 1947	226 days	Italian Socialist Party	Constituent Assembly (1946)
	Umberto Terracini (1895–1983)	8 February 1947	31 January 1948	357 days	Italian Communist Party	Constituent Assembly (1946)

== Last living members ==
After the death of Emilio Colombo on 24 June 2013 at the age of 93, there are no surviving members of the Constituent Assembly.

Teresa Mattei, the last surviving female member of the Constituent Assembly, died on 12 March 2013 at the age of 92.

== See also ==
- Trizone's Parlamentarischer Rat
