= 1968 Italian Senate election in Lombardy =

- May 19, 1968

All 45 Lombard seats to the Italian Senate
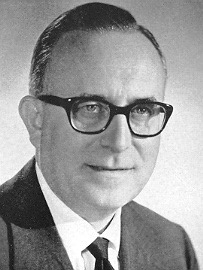

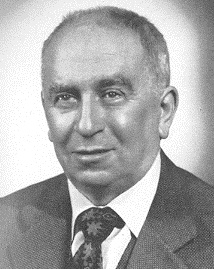

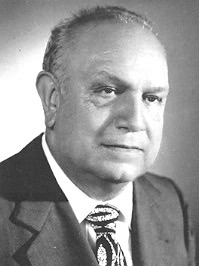
	Majority party	Minority party	Third party
Leader	Mariano Rumor	Luigi Longo	Francesco De Martino
Party	DC	PCI	Unified Socialist Party
Last election	39.9%, 19 seats	20.7%, 10 seats	24.5%, 11 seats as PSI+PSDI
Seats won	20	12	8
Seat change	▲1	▲2	▼3
Popular vote	1,984,072	1,238,087	836,918
Percentage	42.2%	26.3%	17.8%
Swing	▲2.3%	▲5.6%	▼6.7%
Old local plurality before election
DC
New local plurality
DC

Lombardy elected its fifth delegation to the Italian Senate on May 19, 1968. This election was a part of the national Italian general election of 1968 even if, according to the Italian Constitution, every senatorial challenge in each Region is a single and independent race.

The election was won by the centrist Christian Democracy, as it happened at a national level. Seven Lombard provinces gave a majority or at least a plurality to the winning party, while the agricultural Province of Pavia and Province of Mantua preferred the Italian Communist Party.

== Background ==
Following the alliance between Christian Democracy and the Italian Socialist Party (PSI), which entered into Aldo Moro's centre-left governments, the PSI created a federation with another member of the coalition, the Italian Democratic Socialist Party, but it paid its toll to the Italian Communist Party, which joined its forces with the newly established Italian Socialist Party of Proletarian Unity, the former Socialist leftist wing.

== Electoral system ==
The electoral system for the Senate was a strange hybrid which established a form of proportional representation into FPTP-like constituencies. A candidate needed a landslide victory of more than 65% of votes to obtain a direct mandate. All constituencies where this result was not reached entered into an at-large calculation based upon the D'Hondt method to distribute the seats between the parties, and candidates with the best percentages of suffrages inside their party list were elected.

== Results ==
Party	votes	votes (%)	seats	swing
Christian Democracy	1,984,071	42.2	20	▲1
Italian Communist Party & PSIUP	1,238,087	26.3	12	▲2
PSI & PSDI	836,918	17.8	8	▼3
Italian Liberal Party	397,273	8.4	4	=
Italian Social Movement	177,956	3.8	1	=
Others	70,545	1.5	-	=
Total parties	4,704,850	100.0	45	-

Sources: Italian Ministry of the Interior

=== Constituencies ===
N°	Constituency	Elected	Party	Votes %	Others
1	Bergamo	Giovanni Zonca	Christian Democracy	58.1%	
2	Clusone	Giuseppe Belotti	Christian Democracy	66.3%	
3	Treviglio	Aurelio Colleoni	Christian Democracy	62.1%	
4	Brescia	Annibale Fada; Dolores Abbiati	Christian Democracy; Italian Communist Party	44.6% 25.4%	
5	Breno	Giacomo Mazzoli	Christian Democracy	58.1%	
6	Chiari	Faustino Zugno	Christian Democracy	57.9%	
7	Salò	Fabiano De Zan	Christian Democracy	48.8%	
8	Como	Pasquale Valsecchi	Christian Democracy	44.0%	
9	Lecco	Tommaso Morlino	Christian Democracy	54.3%	
10	Cantù	Mario Martinelli	Christian Democracy	53.9%	
11	Cremona	Giovanni Lombardi; Arnaldo Bera	Christian Democracy; Italian Communist Party	40.1% 34.4%	
12	Crema	Ennio Zelioli	Christian Democracy	52.4%	
13	Mantua	Tullia Romagnoli	Italian Communist Party (Gsi)	34.3%	Leonello Zenti (DC) 35.6% Elena Gatti (PSU) 19.4%
14	Ostiglia	Teodosio Aimoni; Gastone Darè	Italian Communist Party; Italian Socialist Party (PSDI)	41.2% 21.0%	
15	Milan 1	Giorgio Bergamasco	Italian Liberal Party	25.7%	
16	Milan 2	Francantonio Biaggi; Gastone Nencioni	Italian Liberal Party; Italian Social Movement	22.6% 7.7%	
17	Milan 3	Italo Viglianesi; Arturo Robba	Italian Socialist Party; Italian Liberal Party	21.4% 18.6%	
18	Milan 4	Vincenzo Palumbo; Alessandro Morino	Italian Liberal Party; Italian Socialist Party (PSDI)	21.0% 19.5%	
19	Milan 5	Mario Venanzi; Pietro Caleffi	Italian Communist Party; Italian Socialist Party	25.7% 22.1%	
20	Milan 6	Arialdo Banfi	Italian Socialist Party	22.9%	
21	Abbiategrasso	Luigi Noè; Ada Valeria Ruhl	Christian Democracy; Italian Communist Party	40.9% 31.5%	
22	Rho	Mario Dosi; Gian Mario Albani	Christian Democracy; Italian Communist Party (Gsi)	39.7% 33.3%	
23	Monza	Vittorio Pozzar	Christian Democracy	43.2%	
24	Vimercate	Giovanni Marcora; Gianfranco Maris	Christian Democracy; Italian Communist Party	48.7% 27.1%	
25	Lodi	Camillo Ripamonti; Giovanni Brambilla	Christian Democracy; Italian Communist Party	43.1% 35.5%	
26	Pavia	Vittorio Naldini	Italian Communist Party (PSIUP)	36.3%	
27	Voghera	Giorgio Piovano	Italian Communist Party	32.8%	Giovanni Celasco (DC) 35.2%
28	Vigevano	Francesco Soliano	Italian Communist Party	44.3%	
29	Sondrio	Athos Valsecchi; Edoardo Catellani	Christian Democracy; Italian Socialist Party	53.9% 23.1%	
30	Varese	Pio Alessandrini; Paolo Cavezzali	Christian Democracy; Italian Socialist Party	43.4% 20.8%	
31	Busto Arsizio	Natale Santero; Michele Zuccalà	Christian Democracy; Italian Socialist Party	45.3% 19.2%	

- Senators with a direct mandate have bold percentages. The electoral system was, in the other cases, a form of proportional representation and not a FPTP race: so candidates winning with a simple plurality could have (and usually had) a candidate (usually a Christian democrat) with more votes in their constituency.

=== Substitutions ===
- Elena Gatti for Mantua (19.4%) replaced Alessandro Morino in 1969. Reason: death.
- Leonello Zenti for Mantua (35.6%) replaced Natale Santero in 1971. Reason: death.
- Giovanni Celasco for Voghera (35.2%) replaced Annibale Fada in 1971. Reason: death.
