= 1972 Italian Senate election in Lombardy =

- May 7, 1972

All 45 Lombard seats to the Italian Senate
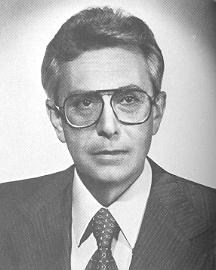

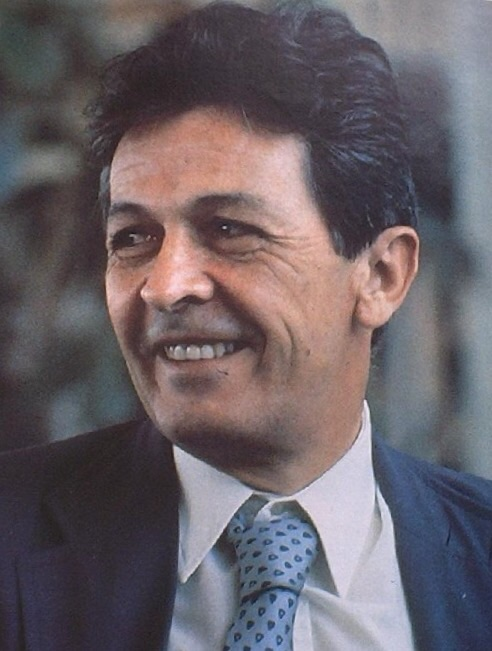

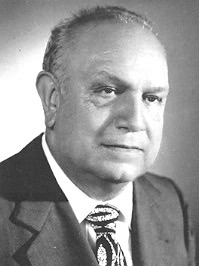
	Majority party	Minority party	Third party
Leader	Arnaldo Forlani	Enrico Berlinguer	Francesco De Martino
Party	DC	PCI	PSI
Last election	42.2%, 20 seats	26.3%, 12 seats	13.3%, 6 seats as ¾ of the PSU
Seats won	20	12	6
Seat change	=	=	=
Popular vote	2,072,472	1,219,259	644,694
Percentage	41.7%	24.5%	13.0%
Swing	▼0.5%	▼1.8%	▼0.3%
Old local plurality before election
DC
New local plurality
DC

Lombardy elected its sixth delegation to the Italian Senate on May 19, 1972. This election was a part of national Italian general election of 1972 even if, according to the Italian Constitution, every senatorial challenge in each Region is a single and independent race.

The election was won by the centrist Christian Democracy, as it happened at national level. Seven Lombard provinces gave a majority or at least a plurality to the winning party, while the agricultural Province of Pavia and Province of Mantua preferred the Italian Communist Party.

== Background ==
This election was quite a copy of the previous one. The Italian Liberal Party was the sole loser, to its left to the Italian Republican Party and to its right to the Italian Social Movement.

== Electoral system ==
The electoral system for the Senate was a strange hybrid which established a form of proportional representation into FPTP-like constituencies. A candidate needed a landslide victory of more than 65% of votes to obtain a direct mandate. All constituencies where this result was not reached entered into an at-large calculation based upon the D'Hondt method to distribute the seats between the parties, and candidates with the best percentages of suffrages inside their party list were elected.

== Results ==
Party	votes	votes (%)	seats	swing
Christian Democracy	2,072,474	41.7	20	=
Italian Communist Party & PSIUP	1,219,259	24.5	12	=
Italian Socialist Party	644,694	13.0	6	=
Italian Social Movement	303,850	6.1	2	▲1
Italian Liberal Party	279,887	5.6	2	▼2
Italian Democratic Socialist Party	265,518	5.3	2	=
Italian Republican Party	157,535	3.2	1	▲1
Others	27,876	0.6	-	=
Total parties	4,970,693	100.0	45	-

Sources: Italian Ministry of the Interior

=== Constituencies ===
N°	Constituency	Elected	Party	Votes %	Others
1	Bergamo	Gianbattista Scaglia	Christian Democracy	59.6%	
2	Clusone	Giuseppe Belotti	Christian Democracy	66.6%	
3	Treviglio	Nullo Biaggi	Christian Democracy	60.8%	
4	Brescia	Mino Martinazzoli	Christian Democracy	44.9%	
5	Breno	Giacomo Mazzoli	Christian Democracy	58.1%	
6	Chiari	Faustino Zugno	Christian Democracy	58.0%	
7	Salò	Fabiano De Zan; Egidio Ariosto	Christian Democracy; Italian Democratic Socialist Party	49.1% 8.3%	
8	Como	Ubaldo De Ponti; Virginio Bertinelli	Christian Democracy; Italian Democratic Socialist Party	44.0% 9.2%	
9	Lecco	Tommaso Morlino	Christian Democracy	52.7%	
10	Cantù	Mario Martinelli	Christian Democracy	51.7%	Carlo Porro (PSDI) 7.2%
11	Cremona	Vincenzo Vernaschi; Giuseppe Garoli; Giuseppe Grossi	Christian Democracy; Italian Communist Party; Italian Socialist Party	39.9% 32.0% 15.4%	
12	Crema	Narciso Patrini	Christian Democracy	51.2%	
13	Mantua	Tullia Romagnoli	Italian Communist Party (Gsi)	31.9%	Leonello Zenti (DC) 35.7%
14	Ostiglia	Agostino Zavattini; Renato Colombo	Italian Communist Party; Italian Socialist Party	39.3% 16.7%	
15	Milan 1	Giorgio Bergamasco; Giovanni Nencioni; Giovanni Spadolini	Italian Liberal Party; Italian Social Movement; Italian Republican Party	16.1% 14.8% 9.0%	
16	Milan 2	Arturo Robba	Italian Liberal Party	14.1%	
17	Milan 3	Giorgio Pisanò	Italian Social Movement	11.9%	
18	Milan 4	None elected			
19	Milan 5	Mario Venanzi	Italian Communist Party	27.2%	
20	Milan 6	Lelio Basso	Italian Communist Party (Gsi)	29.5%	
21	Abbiategrasso	Luigi Noè; Ada Valeria Ruhl; Agostino Viviani	Christian Democracy; Italian Communist Party; Italian Socialist Party	40.2% 29.9% 16.9%	
22	Rho	Ettore Calvi; Modesto Merzario	Christian Democracy; Italian Communist Party (PSIUP)	37.7% 31.5%	
23	Monza	Vittorio Pozzar	Christian Democracy	41.8%	
24	Vimercate	Giovanni Marcora; Guido Venegoni	Christian Democracy; Italian Communist Party	45.8% 25.8%	
25	Lodi	Camillo Ripamonti; Rodolfo Bollini	Christian Democracy; Italian Communist Party	41.6% 33.3%	
26	Pavia	Renato Cebrelli	Italian Communist Party	34.2%	
27	Voghera	Giorgio Piovano	Italian Communist Party	31.7%	
28	Vigevano	Armando Cossutta	Italian Communist Party	42.3%	
29	Sondrio	Athos Valsecchi; Edoardo Catellani	Christian Democracy; Italian Socialist Party	53.0% 18.6%	
30	Varese	Pio Alessandrini; Paolo Cavezzali	Christian Democracy; Italian Socialist Party	41.7% 15.5%	
31	Busto Arsizio	Pierino Azimonti; Michele Zuccalà	Christian Democracy; Italian Socialist Party	43.8% 15.4%	

- Senators with a direct mandate have bold percentages. The electoral system was, in the other cases, a form of proportional representation and not a FPTP race: so candidates winning with a simple plurality could have (and usually had) a candidate (usually a Christian democrat) with more votes in their constituency.

=== Substitutions ===
- Carlo Porro for Cantù (7.2%) replaced Virginio Bertinelli in 1973. Reason: death.
- Leonello Zenti for Mantua (35.7%) replaced Faustino Zugno in 1975. Reason: death.
