= Tullio Vecchietti =

Italian politician and journalist

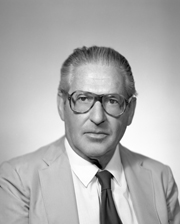

Member of the Senate of the Republic
- In office 20 June 1979 – 22 April 1992
- Constituency: Emilia-Romagna (1979–1987); Lazio (1987–1992)

Member of the Chamber of Deputies
- In office 5 July 1976 – 19 June 1979
- Constituency: Rome
- In office 25 June 1953 – 24 May 1972
- Constituency: Rome

Personal details
- Born: 29 July 1914 Rome, Italy
- Died: 15 January 1999 (aged 84) Rome, Italy
- Party: PSI (until 1964); PSIUP (1964–1972); PCI (1972–1991)

Tullio Vecchietti (29 July 1914 – 15 January 1999) was an Italian politician and journalist.

== Biography ==
During the Second World War Tullio Vecchietti participated in the Italian resistance movement. From 1951 to 1963 he directed Avanti!, the newspaper of the Italian Socialist Party. He was elected to the Chamber of Deputies for the first time with the PSI in 1953.

Contrary to participation in the government with the Christian Democracy, in 1963 he founded the Italian Socialist Party of Proletarian Unity, together with Lelio Basso, Vittorio Foa, Lucio Libertini and Emilio Lussu and Dario Valori. Vecchietti was secretary of the PSIUP from the foundation until September 1971, when he was replaced by Dario Valori.

After the electoral defeat of 1972, Tullio Vecchietti, together with numerous comrades, joined the Italian Communist Party. He was re-elected deputy in 1976 and senator in 1979, 1983 and 1987.

He died on 15 January 1999.

== Electoral history ==
Election	House	Constituency	Party	Votes	Result
1953	Chamber of Deputies	Rome–Viterbo–Latina–Frosinone	PSI	16,303	Elected
1958	Chamber of Deputies	Rome–Viterbo–Latina–Frosinone	PSI	16,488	Elected
1963	Chamber of Deputies	Rome–Viterbo–Latina–Frosinone	PSI	25,129	Elected
1968	Chamber of Deputies	Rome–Viterbo–Latina–Frosinone	PSIUP	14,933	Elected
1972	Chamber of Deputies	Rome–Viterbo–Latina–Frosinone	PSIUP	6,469	Not elected
1976	Chamber of Deputies	Rome–Viterbo–Latina–Frosinone	PCI	55,273	Elected
1979	Senate of the Republic	Emilia-Romagna – Carpi	PCI	79,231	Elected
1983	Senate of the Republic	Emilia-Romagna – Carpi	PCI	80,512	Elected
1987	Senate of the Republic	Lazio – Rome IV	PCI	113,239	Elected
