= Augusto De Marsanich =

Italian politician (1893–1973)

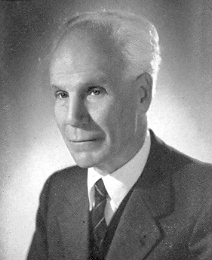

Member of the Senate of the Republic
- In office 5 June 1968 – 24 May 1972
- Constituency: Lazio

Member of the Chamber of Deputies
- In office 25 June 1953 – 4 June 1968
- Constituency: L'Aquila (1953–1958); Rome (1958–1968)

President of the Italian Social Movement
- In office 10 October 1954 – 24 May 1972
- Preceded by: Rodolfo Graziani
- Succeeded by: Gino Birindelli

Secretary of the Italian Social Movement
- In office 10 January 1950 – 10 October 1954
- Preceded by: Giorgio Almirante
- Succeeded by: Arturo Michelini

Member of the Chamber of Fasces and Corporations
- In office 23 March 1939 – 5 August 1943
- Appointed by: Benito Mussolini

Member of the Chamber of Deputies
- In office 20 April 1929 – 2 March 1939
- Constituency: Italy at-large

Personal details
- Born: 13 April 1893 Rome, Kingdom of Italy
- Died: 10 February 1973 (aged 79) Rome, Italy
- Party: PNF (1921–1943); PFR (1943–1945); MSI (1946–1973)
- Height: 1.66 m (5 ft 5 in)
- Profession: Journalist, manager

Augusto De Marsanich (13 April 1893 – 10 February 1973) was an Italian fascist politician and the second leader of the Italian Social Movement (MSI).

== Early years ==
De Marsanich was born in Rome. He enlisted in the Italian Army in 1916 and saw active service in the First World War. After leaving the army he became involved in politics and joined the National Fascist Party in 1920. He was a journalist by profession and worked for La Stampa most notably.

== Under the fascists ==
Although he did not achieve high office, De Marsanich held a number of positions within the fascist movement. He served as a director of the local party in Latium and Sabine from 1927 to 1929, briefly serving as a member of the Fascist Grand Council in the latter year. 1929 also saw him take a seat in the Chamber of Deputies, where he remained a member until 1943. Seen as something of a bureaucrat, he variously served with the Syndical Office, as head of the party's Legal Office, President of the Syndical Confederation of Commerce and Vice-President of the Corporation for the Building Trades.

He served as under-secretary of communications from 1935 to 1943 and also represented Italy at the League of Nations during the Ethiopia crisis. He also was a regular contributor to a number of fascist journals, notably Giuseppe Bottai's Critica Fascista and served as a director of the fascist monthly Il Lavoro Fascista. As the maternal uncle of novelist Alberto Moravia De Marsanich helped to ensure that he enjoyed the patronage of Benito Mussolini's government.

He continued to hold a number of positions in the Italian Social Republic, most notably acting as Assistant Postmaster-General, as well as serving as chairman of both the Banco di Roma and Alfa Romeo. Within the Salo Republic he largely belonged to the moderate tendency that cautioned against the growing atmosphere of violence and the pervading influence of Nazism.

== Post-war activity ==
De Marsanich joined the MSI after the Second World War and was part of the more moderate tendency with the party. He became leader in 1950 and under his leadership the MSI became more fully committed to the parliamentary route to government and he even sought alliances with other parties, including Christian Democracy, the Italian Liberal Party and the Monarchist National Party. In his attempts to form a united front of anti-communism he was frustrated by more hard-line fascist loyalists such as Giorgio Almirante. In his capacity as MSI leader De Marsanich also served as part of the four man leadership of the European Social Movement (ESM), along with Per Engdahl, Maurice Bardèche and Karl-Heinz Priester. His commitment to moderation in the MSI was frequently at odds with his enthusiastic support for the ESM, a group that contained several leading neo-Nazi activists.

He was succeeded as leader by fellow moderate Arturo Michelini in 1954, although he continued to be a leading MSI figure as national secretary. He was again elected to the Italian Chamber of Deputies in 1953 and the Italian Senate in 1968. He was also unsuccessful candidate for the President of Italy in 1964. In 1971 the veteran De Marsanich was appointed to President of the MSI, having previously been made honorary Vice-President in 1955.

== Electoral history ==
Election	House	Constituency	Party	Votes	Result
1929	Chamber of Deputies	Italy at-large	PNF	– (Note: Elected by plebiscite as a member of a closed list in a single-party system.)	Elected
1934	Chamber of Deputies	Italy at-large	PNF	–	Elected
1953	Chamber of Deputies	L'Aquila–Pescara–Chieti–Teramo	MSI	12,082	Elected
1958	Chamber of Deputies	Rome–Viterbo–Latina–Frosinone	MSI	21,215	Elected
1963	Chamber of Deputies	Rome–Viterbo–Latina–Frosinone	MSI	33,432	Elected
1968	Senate of the Republic	Lazio – Rome II	MSI	24,514	Elected
