= Mario Tanassi =

Italian politician (1916–2007)

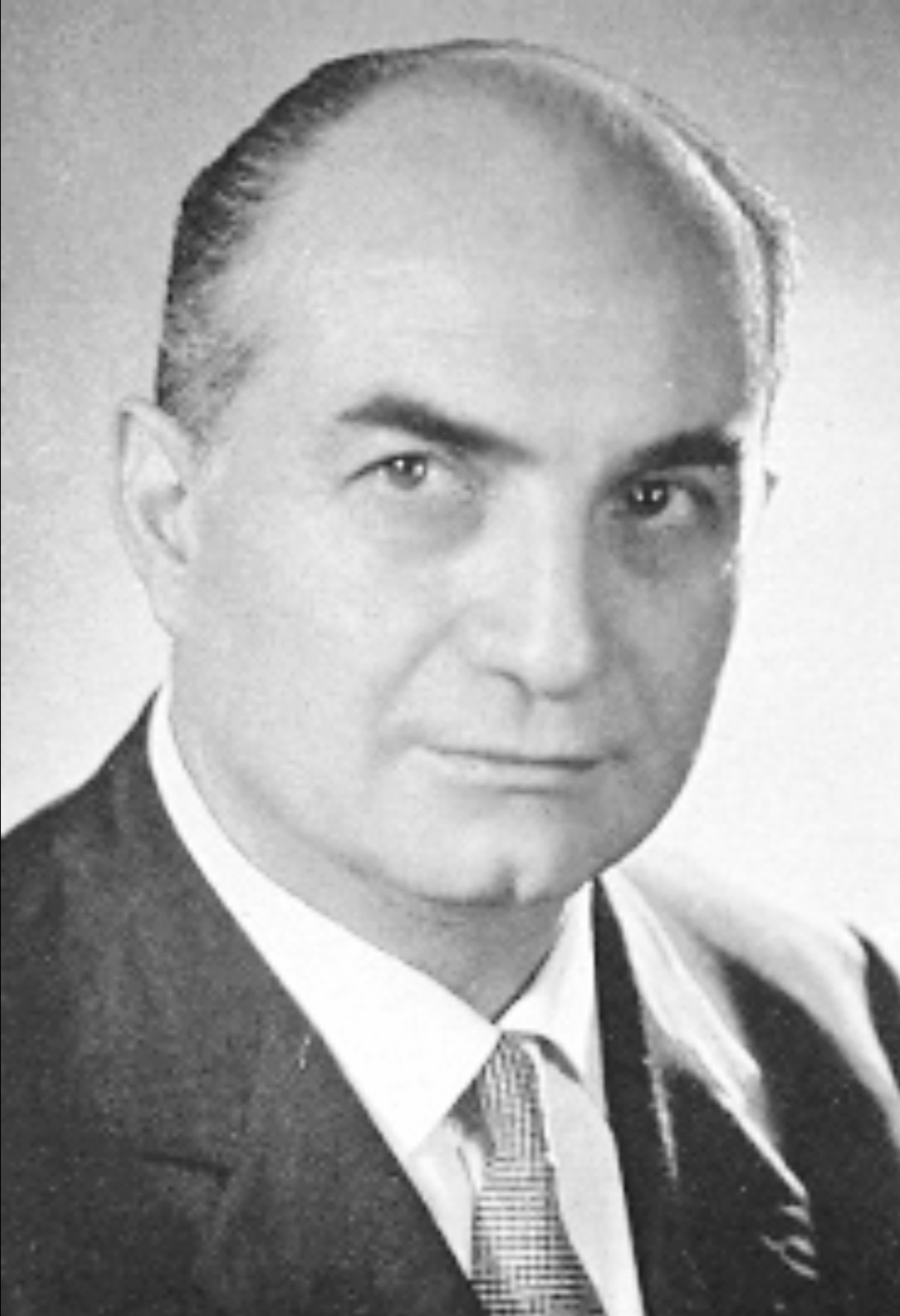

Deputy Prime Minister of Italy
- In office 26 June 1972 – 8 July 1973
- Prime Minister: Giulio Andreotti
- Preceded by: Francesco De Martino
- Succeeded by: Ugo La Malfa
Other Ministerial offices
Minister of Finance
In office 14 March 1974 – 23 November 1974
Prime Minister	Mariano Rumor
Preceded by	Emilio Colombo
Succeeded by	Bruno Visentini
Minister of Defence
In office 26 June 1972 – 14 March 1974
Prime Minister	Giulio Andreotti; Mariano Rumor
Preceded by	Franco Restivo
Succeeded by	Giulio Andreotti
In office 23 March 1970 – 18 February 1972
Prime Minister	Mariano Rumor; Emilio Colombo
Preceded by	Luigi Gui
Succeeded by	Franco Restivo
Minister of Industry, Commerce and Craftsmanship
In office 12 December 1968 – 5 August 1969
Prime Minister	Mariano Rumor
Preceded by	Giulio Andreotti
Succeeded by	Domenico Magrì
Parliamentary offices
Member of the Chamber of Deputies
In office 16 May 1963 – 13 March 1979
Constituency	Rome

Personal details
- Born: 17 March 1916 Ururi, Italy
- Died: 5 May 2007 (aged 91) Rome, Italy
- Party: PSIUP (until 1947); PSLI (1947–1951); PSDI (since 1951)
- Profession: Journalist, Politician

Mario Tanassi (17 March 1916 – 5 May 2007) was an Italian politician, who was several times Minister of the Italian Republic. In 1979 he was condemned by the Constitutional Court of Italy for his involvement in the Lockheed bribery scandal.

== Biography ==
Tanassi was born at Ururi, in the province of Campobasso. He joined the Italian Democratic Socialist Party (Partito Socialista Democratico Italiano; PSDI) and was later national co-secretary, alongside Francesco De Martino, of the unified PSI-PSDI, a short-lived reunion of the PSDI and the Italian Socialist Party. In 1963 he became a deputy in the Chamber of Deputies, a position he would hold until 1979.

He was minister of defence for the first time in the Rumor II Cabinet (1970), formed by an alliance between Christian Democracy (DC), PSI and PSDI. In 1972 he was again appointed as minister of defence, as well as vice-prime minister, in the Andreotti II Cabinet (in which the Italian Liberal Party had replaced the Socialists). Tanassi was minister of defence for the third time in the fourth Rumor Government (DC-PSI-PSDI-PRI).

After a short tenure in 1972, in June 1975 he again became national secretary of the PSDI, replacing Flavio Orlandi. Soon afterwards, he was involved in the Lockheed bribery scandal together with Mariano Rumor and Luigi Gui, causing him to lose his position as the party's secretary. In 1979 the Constitutional Court of Italy found him guilty of bribery and he spent four months in jail. He was the first Italian former minister to serve a prison sentence and the first politician convicted before the nationwide Clean Hands corruption scandals in the 1990s.

== Electoral history ==
Election	House	Constituency	Party	Votes	Result
1948	Chamber of Deputies	Campobasso	US	1,652	Not elected
1963	Chamber of Deputies	Rome–Viterbo–Latina–Frosinone	PSDI	26,103	Elected
1968	Chamber of Deputies	Rome–Viterbo–Latina–Frosinone	PSU	54,105	Elected
1972	Chamber of Deputies	Rome–Viterbo–Latina–Frosinone	PSDI	51,179	Elected
1976	Chamber of Deputies	Rome–Viterbo–Latina–Frosinone	PSDI	13,876	Elected

Political offices
Preceded by Giuseppe Saragat	Secretary of the Italian Democratic Socialist Party; 1964-1966	Succeeded by Unification with the Italian Socialist Party
Preceded by Mauro Ferri	Secretary of the Italian Democratic Socialist Party; 1972	Succeeded by Flavio Orlandi
Preceded by Flavio Orlandi	Secretary of the Italian Democratic Socialist Party; 1975-1976	Succeeded by Giuseppe Saragat
