= Giorgio Almirante =

Italian politician (1914–1988)

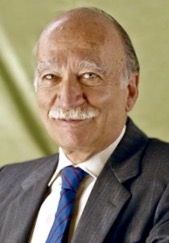
- Almirante in 1986

President of the Italian Social Movement
- In office 24 January 1988 – 22 May 1988
- Preceded by: Nino Tripodi
- Succeeded by: Alfredo Pazzaglia

Secretary of the Italian Social Movement
- In office 29 June 1969 – 13 December 1987
- Preceded by: Arturo Michelini
- Succeeded by: Gianfranco Fini
- In office 15 June 1947 – 15 January 1950
- Preceded by: Giacinto Trevisonno
- Succeeded by: Augusto De Marsanich

Member of the European Parliament for Southern Italy
- In office 17 July 1979 – 22 May 1988

Member of the Chamber of Deputies
- In office 8 May 1948 – 22 May 1988
- Constituency: Rome

Personal details
- Born: 27 June 1914 Salsomaggiore Terme, Italy
- Died: 22 May 1988 (aged 73) Rome, Italy
- Party: National Fascist Party (1930s–1943); Republican Fascist Party (1943–1945); Italian Social Movement (1946–1988)
- Spouses: Gabriella Magnatti (m. 1930s; div. 1969); Assunta Almirante (m. 1969)
- Children: 2
- Parent: Mario Almirante
- Occupation: Journalist; politician

Military service
- Allegiance: Italian Social Republic (1943–1945)
- Branch: National Republican Guard
- Service years: 1943–1945
- Rank: Capomanipolo
- Battles/wars: World War II; Italian Civil War

Giorgio Almirante (27 June 1914 – 22 May 1988) was an Italian politician who founded the neo-fascist Italian Social Movement, which he led until his retirement in 1987.

== Early life ==
Almirante was born at Salsomaggiore Terme, in Emilia Romagna, but his parents were Molisian with noble ancestry. His aunt was the actress Italia Almirante Manzini. He spent his childhood following his parents, who worked in the theatre, in Turin and Rome. He graduated in literature in 1937.

== Pre-war Fascism and role during World War II ==
Almirante trained as a schoolteacher, but went to work writing for the Rome-based fascist paper Il Tevere. He was influenced by the journalist Telesio Interlandi, who was his ideological mentor. A journalist by profession, Almirante wrote extensively for Interlandi's journal La Difesa della Razza (The defence of race). Almirante also helped to organise the Italian Social Republic (RSI), in which he was appointed Chief of Cabinet of the Minister of Culture in 1944.

== Italian Social Movement ==
=== Leadership ===
Following the defeat of fascism, Almirante was indicted on charges that he ordered the shooting of partisans in 1944, although a general amnesty saw this lifted. He fled Italy after the war but returned in 1946 to set up his own small fascist group. It was quickly absorbed into the Italian Social Movement (MSI), which was set up the same year. Almirante was chosen as leader of the new party in part because of his low profile, as the higher-ranking members of the fascist regime involved in the MSI opted instead to take on behind-the-scenes roles. Representing a radical faction within the party, Almirante's group lost ground as more moderate elements gained influence in the party; this tendency soon gained the upper hand, forcing Almirante to give way to Augusto De Marsanich as leader in 1950. He had intimated his support for the Europe a nation ideas prevalent at the time, but failed to convince the party to take a position against De Marsanich's pro-NATO policy.

=== Opposition ===
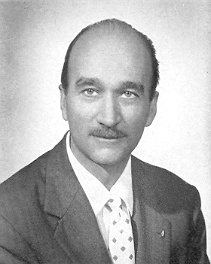
Almirante in 1963

During the mid-1950s, Almirante, disquieted by the drift towards conservatism under De Marsanich and his successor Arturo Michelini, resigned his position on the National Council to become a critic of the leadership. He emphasised the proletarian origins of fascism against the new conservatism and argued for 'quality' rather than 'quantity' in government, endorsing expert-driven elites instead of liberal democracy. However, he stopped short of the route taken by the other leading dissident Pino Rauti by remaining within the party. Like Rauti, however, he became increasingly influenced in his thought by Julius Evola, even hailing the philosopher as "our Marcuse – only better".

In his role as leader of the internal opposition, Almirante was not averse to employing the tactics of the Blackshirts, and indeed in 1968 he was one of three leaders of a 'punitive expedition' against student radicals at the Fine Arts Department at the University of Rome. However, Almirante and some 200 followers were routed and, in the end, were protected by the police.

=== Return to the leadership ===
Almirante regained the leadership of the party in 1969 following the death of Michelini. By now, his own opinions had shifted somewhat towards a more moderate position as he soon declared his own support for democracy. On this basis, he aimed to attract more conservative elements to the MSI, while simultaneously passing reforms that strengthened the power of the party secretary in order to pre-empt opposition from the radical tendency with which he had been associated. He also sought to 'historicise' fascism and dropped the more overt references to the ideology from MSI propaganda and rhetoric, notably shelving the black shirt and the Roman salute.

His new policy, known as the strategia del doppio binario (double track strategy), was not aimed at making the MSI more palatable to the Christian Democrats, as had been the plan of his predecessor, but rather to move the MSI into that party's ideological space and so challenge them directly for the leadership of the right. Almirante felt that by placing anti-communism at the heart of the MSI's appeal the party could attract both its existing followers and more moderate conservatives and could in time rival Christian Democrats as the main party of the right. As part of this policy he brought in a number of disparate rightist groups, merging the MSI with the Italian Democratic Party of Monarchist Unity, readmitting the hard-line splinter group Ordine Nuovo (New Order), and adding establishment figures such as Admiral Gino Birindelli and General Giovanni de Lorenzo as members. However, the policy floundered as the MSI made few inroads into Christian Democrat support and instead pushed the mainstream right towards an accommodation with the Italian Communist Party. As a consequence, some of the moderate faction split off to form the National Democracy in 1977.

On 18 June 1973 around noon, on his way back from a political rally, Almirante with three party comrades stopped at a Motta restaurant (now Autogrill) on A1 motorway Cantagallo rest area, in Casalecchio di Reno near Bologna, near where the Marzabotto massacre had occurred less than 29 years ago. When a waiter recognized him, the restaurant staff called their union, and declaring themselves anti-fascists, they went on a strike, refusing to serve Almirante or anyone else until he left, forcing him to leave. As many as 16 staff members went on trial for the incident (for which they were acquitted). A Bologna-based leftist musical group, "Canzoniere delle lame", released the single "All'armi... siam digiuni... (al Cantagallo)", the proceeds were used to pay the staff's legal fees.

In 1975 he travelled to the USA where he met with members of the National Security Council at the Eisenhower Executive Office Building.

Despite the policy's failure to deliver at the ballot box, under Almirante's leadership the MSI did emerge to an extent from the political ghetto, a shift demonstrated in 1984 when Almirante was allowed to enter the headquarters of the Communist Party in order to pay respects to their dead leader Enrico Berlinguer, a gesture that had been unimaginable for an MSI leader. However, his newly moderate approach brought him into conflict with Rauti and clashes between the two became a feature of the annual party conference.

Almirante also served the MSI in parliament, although he was stripped of parliamentary immunity three times: in 1979, he was charged with trying to revive the Fascist Party; and in 1981 and also in 1984, he was charged with aiding and abetting Carlo Cicuttini, who had fled Italy after a 1972 Peteano car bomb that killed three policemen. However, Almirante received amnesty under a 1987 law.

== Retirement ==
Dogged by poor health, Almirante stepped down as leader at the 1987 National Congress and saw the leadership pass to his protégé Gianfranco Fini. Fini had been close to Almirante since 1977, when the MSI leader had Fini appointed chief of the MSI youth movement even though he had only finished seventh in the members' vote. Fini largely followed in Almirante's footsteps in attempting to shift Italy from a parliamentary to a fully presidential system.

Almirante died in Rome on 22 May 1988, on the same weekend as his former colleagues and fellow Italian Fascist leaders Dino Grandi and Pino Romualdi. Grandi and Romualdi died on 21 May 1988, and Almirante died the following day.

== Electoral history ==
Election	House	Constituency	Party	Votes	Result
1948	Chamber of Deputies	Rome–Viterbo–Latina–Frosinone	MSI	15,501	Elected
1953	Chamber of Deputies	Rome–Viterbo–Latina–Frosinone	MSI	51,923	Elected
1958	Chamber of Deputies	Rome–Viterbo–Latina–Frosinone	MSI	49,828	Elected
1963	Chamber of Deputies	Rome–Viterbo–Latina–Frosinone	MSI	46,597	Elected
1968	Chamber of Deputies	Rome–Viterbo–Latina–Frosinone	MSI	54,200	Elected
1972	Chamber of Deputies	Rome–Viterbo–Latina–Frosinone	MSI	218,642	Elected
1976	Chamber of Deputies	Rome–Viterbo–Latina–Frosinone	MSI	123,331	Elected
1979	Chamber of Deputies	Rome–Viterbo–Latina–Frosinone	MSI	114,258	Elected
1979	European Parliament	Southern Italy	MSI	519,479	Elected
1983	Chamber of Deputies	Rome–Viterbo–Latina–Frosinone	MSI	129,375	Elected
1984	European Parliament	Southern Italy	MSI	503,881	Elected
1987	Chamber of Deputies	Rome–Viterbo–Latina–Frosinone	MSI	108,821	Elected

Party political offices
New political party	Secretary of the Italian Social Movement; 1946–1950	Succeeded by Augusto De Marsanich
Preceded by Arturo Michelini	Secretary of the Italian Social Movement; 1969–1987	Succeeded by Gianfranco Fini
European Parliament
New parliament	Member of the European Parliament for Southern Italy; 1979–1988	Succeeded by Title jointly held
Italian Chamber of Deputies
New parliament	Member of the Italian Chamber of Deputies; Legislatures: I, II, III, IV, V, VI, VII, VIII, IX, X 1948–1988	Succeeded by Title jointly held
