= Dolores Abbiati =

Italian politician, trade unionist and partisan (1927–2001)

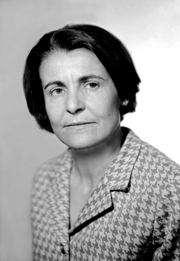
Dolores Abbiati Greco Casotti

Dolores Abbiati Greco Casotti (Brescia, March 17, 1927 — Brescia, June 11, 2001) was an Italian politician, trade unionist and partisan. She was elected to Parliament for three terms: first to the Senate and then twice to Chamber of Deputies.

== Biography ==
Her father, Luigi Abbiati, was among the founders of the Italian Communist Party. In 1927, he was arrested and exiled to Lipari, where he was later joined by his wife Antonia Oscar, nicknamed Ninì, their eldest son Franco, and their newborn Dolores.

The Abbiati family returned to Northern Italy in 1933. However, in 1937, they were arrested again and exiled first to Ponza and then to Tremiti. In 1943, Franco and Dolores Abbiati moved to Val d'Ossola to join the Resistance. During this period, Dolores served as a courier for the Garibaldi Brigades under the code name Lola, while Franco was awarded the bronze medal for Military Valor.

After the war, Dolores Abbiati joined communist youth organizations and from 1960 to 1966, she served as the secretary of the textile union of the CGIL. In the 1968 general elections, she was elected to the Senate, while in the subsequent elections of 1972 and 1976, she was elected to the Chamber of Deputies.
