= Ezio Maria Gray =

Italian fascist politician and journalist

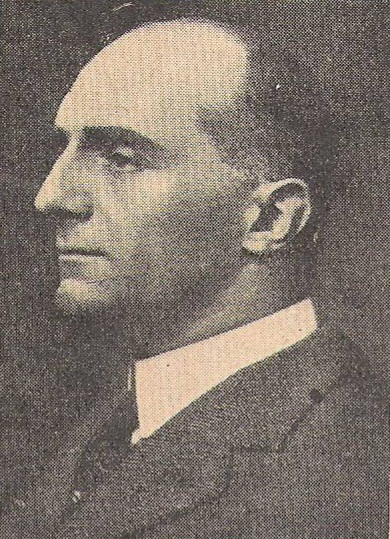
- Ezio Maria Gray
- Born: 9 October 1885; Novara, Kingdom of Italy
- Died: 8 February 1969 (aged 83); Rome, Italian Republic
- Occupations: politician; journalist; writer
- Political party: Italian Nationalist Association; Fasci Italiani di Combattimento; National Fascist Party; Italian Social Movement
- Parent(s): Luigi Gray and Licinia Gray (née Santini)
- Awards: Silver Medal of Military Valour; Bronze Medal of Military Valour

Ezio Maria Gray (born 9 October 1885 in Novara, Piedmont – died 8 February 1969 in Rome) was an Italian fascist politician and journalist. Gray was the architect of the Grand Design for a Mediterranean Confederation dominated by a Latin Alliance. His geopolitical ideas influenced the development of Mussolini's expansionist strategies.

== Early years ==
Gray, a staunch critic of socialism, was a founder member of the Italian Nationalist Association in 1910. A strong supporter of the Libyan war and an interventionist in World War I, he dropped out of politics to serve in the Italian Army during the First World War and afterwards in Dalmatia. He was decorated with the silver medal and the bronze medal for military valour for his exploits during the war.

== Fascism ==
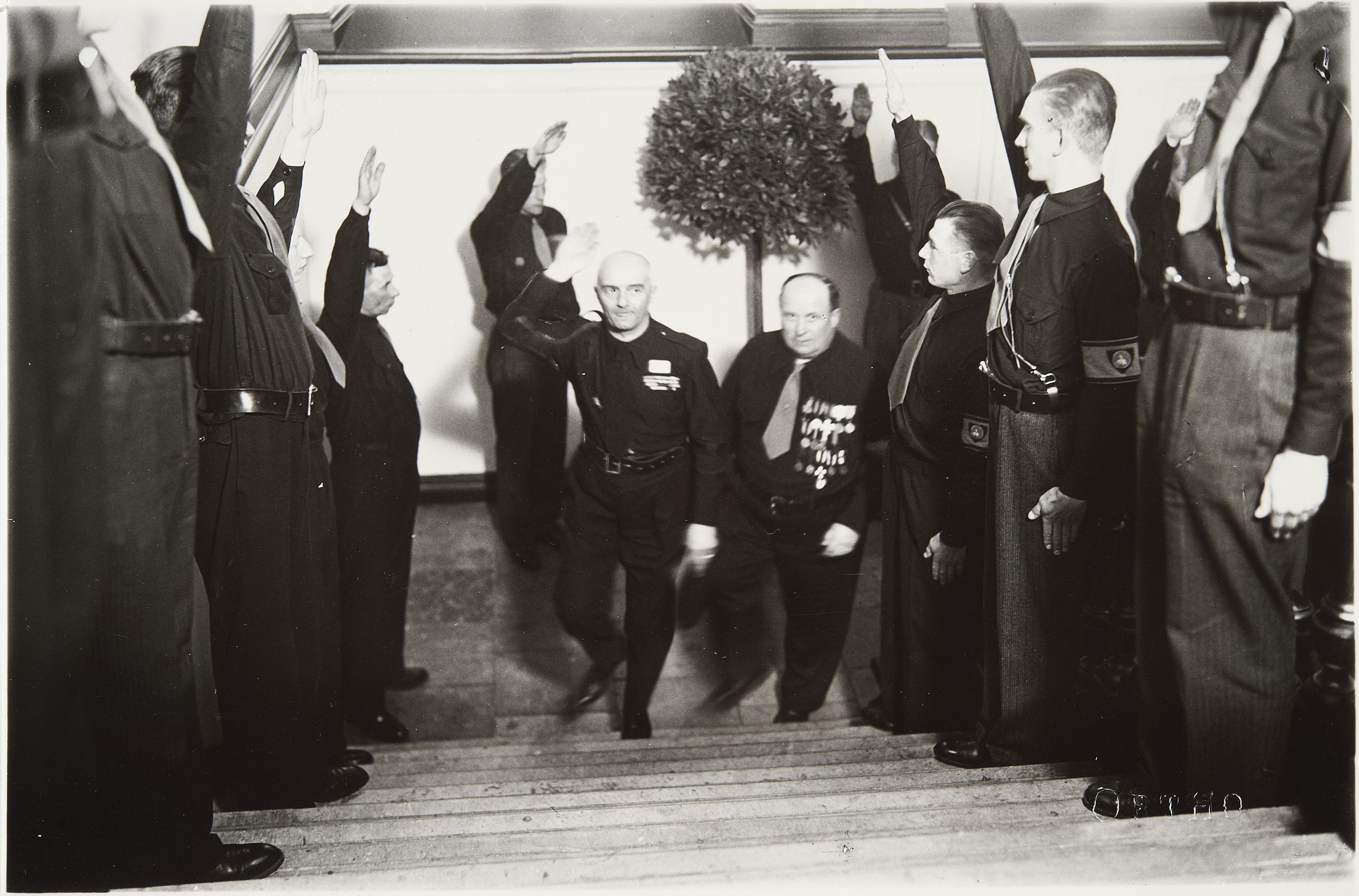
Ezio Maria Gray (left) and the Finnish fascist leader Vihtori Kosola in Helsinki 1935.

On his return to Italy he became a supporter of fascism and set up the Novara fascio in 1920. Gray was elected to parliament for the fascists in 1921 and was appointed to the National Directorate in 1924. The following year he was appointed to the Grand Council of Fascism and in 1927 he took over the editorship of the fascist journal Il Pensiero di Benito Mussolini. Away from his party duties he was a leading figure in the Società Dante Alighieri, President of the Ente Autonomo della Stampa and a businessman with a reputation for shady dealings.

Gray served in the army during the Second World War before returning to civilian life as a radio broadcaster. His broadcasts were especially noted for their anti-Semitic content. His position grew towards the end of the Italian fascists period and on 23 July 1943 he was appointed vice-president of the Chamber of Fasces and Corporations. Gray continued to be an important figure in the Italian Social Republic and was appointed head of the Ente Italiano per le Audizioni Radiofoniche during the republic's brief existence. Following the collapse of this regime he was sentenced to 20 years imprisonment for his leading role in the fascist government.

== Post-war ==
Soon after being sent to prison however Gray was amnestied and in 1947 he launched his own journal, La Rivolta Ideale, which pressed a neo-fascist line. He then edited Il Nazionale, the paper of the Italian Social Movement and became a leading figure on the hard-line tendency, supporting Giorgio Almirante in his struggles with the more moderate Arturo Michelini. In the MSI he became noted for his support for seeking an accommodation with political Catholicism, seeing this as a way to rehabilitate fascism, and to this end held a number of surreptitious meeting with Azione Cattolica leader Dr. Luigi Gedda. Gray returned to parliament, serving the MSI as a deputy from 1953 to 1958 and in the Senate from 1963 to 1968.

== Main works ==
- Lo smeraldo di Nerone, Forlì 1911;
- La bella guerra, Firenze 1912;
- Il Belgio sotto la spada tedesca, ibid. 1915;
- La guerra senza sangue, ibid. 1915;
- Disciplina civile, ibid. 1916;
- Venezia in armi, Milano 1917;
- The bloodless war. Translated by Bernard Miall. London: Hodder & Stoughton. 1917.
- Con le fanterie sarde. Giornate sull'Altipiano e sul Piave, Firenze 1918;
- Come Lenin conquistò la Russia, ibid. 1920;
- Il fronte antibolscevico, ibid. 1920;
- Il processo di Cadorna, ibid. 1920;
- Il pensiero di Mussolini, Milano 1927;
- Oriani maestro di vita e di potenza, Bologna 1930;
- Crescendo di certezze, Roma 1930;
- Credenti nella patria, Milano 1934;
- Antonio Cecchi, ibid. 1935;
- Silvio Pellico, ibid. 1936;
- Francesco Caracciolo e la Rivoluzione napoletana, ibid. 1936;
- L'Italia ha sempre ragione. Cronache del regime (aprile 1932 - giugno 1938), ibid. 1938;
- Ramazza. Cose dette e non dette (15 giugno 1939 - 22 sett. 1941), ibid. 1942.

== Bibliography ==
- Rees, Philip (1990). Biographical Dictionary of the Extreme Right Since 1890. Simon & Schuster. ISBN 0-13-089301-3.
- Sircana, Giuseppe (2002). "GRAY, Ezio Maria". Dizionario Biografico degli Italiani (in Italian). Vol. 58: Gonzales–Graziani. Rome: Istituto dell'Enciclopedia Italiana. ISBN 978-88-12-00032-6.
