= Lelio Basso =

Italian politician and journalist (1903–1978)

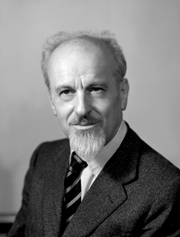

Member of the Senate of the Republic
- In office 25 May 1972 – 16 December 1978
- Constituency: Lombardy

Member of the Chamber of Deputies
- In office 8 May 1948 – 24 May 1972
- Constituency: Milan

Member of the Constituent Assembly
- In office 25 June 1946 – 31 January 1948
- Constituency: Como

Personal details
- Born: 25 December 1903 Varazze, Italy
- Died: 16 December 1978 (aged 74) Rome, Italy
- Party: PSI (1943–1964); PSIUP (1964–1972); SI (since 1972)
- Education: University of Pavia
- Profession: Lawyer, political scientist, journalist

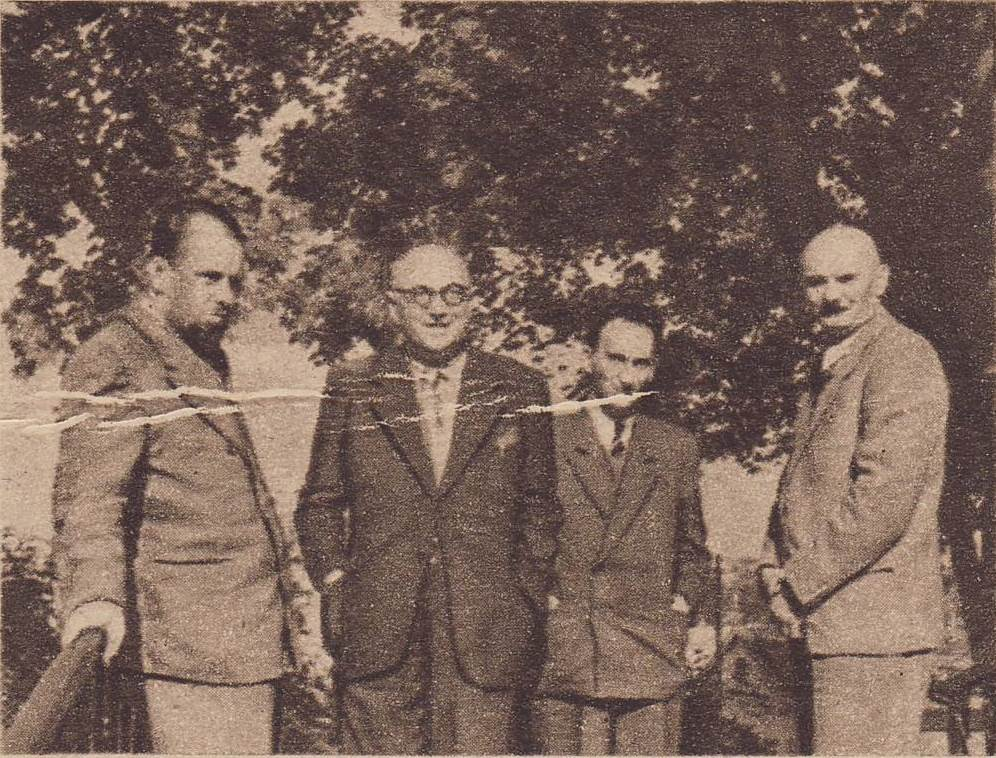
Pietro Nenni (second from the left) and Lelio Basso (on the left) in Warsaw, with them on the right Stanisław Szwalbe

Lelio Basso (25 December 1903 – 16 December 1978) was an Italian democratic socialist politician.

== Early life ==
Lelio Basso was born in Varazze (in the province of Savona) into a Liberal bourgeois family. In 1916, he and his family moved to Milan where he attended the liceo classico Berchet. He enrolled at the Faculty of Law at the University of Pavia in 1921, and joined the Italian Socialist Party (PSI). He studied Marxist doctrine, and was close to Piero Gobetti during his Liberal Revolution phase. In his youth, Basso worked on Critica sociale, Il Caffè, Avanti!, Coscientia, Quarto Stato, and Pietre - which he directed in 1928, initially from Genoa, then from Milan. In 1925, he graduated in law with a thesis on the concept of freedom in Marxist thought.

In April 1928, Basso was arrested by the Fascist authorities in Milan and interned on the island of Ponza, where he studied for his degree in philosophy. He returned to Milan in 1931 and, while practising as a lawyer, graduated with a thesis on Rudolf Otto. In 1934, he once more took up politics as director of the Centro Interno Socialista, with Rodolfo Morandi, Lucio Luzzatto and Eugenio Colorni. This work was interrupted by his imprisonment in the internment camp in Colfiorito (Province of Perugia) from 1939 to 1940.

== In the Resistance and the early Italian Republic ==
After lengthy, secret preparations, he was present at the founding of the Movimento di Unità Proletaria (MUP) on 10 January 1943. The leading group of the movement was formed by Basso, Luzzatto, Roberto Veratti, and Umberto Recalcati. After 25 July (when Benito Mussolini was ousted by a coup d'état inside his Grand Council of Fascism), the movement joined with the PSI to form the Italian Socialist Party of Proletarian Unity (PSIUP), with Basso as one of the leading figures. Later in 1943, Basso went against the party line to found the clandestine newspaper Bandiera Rossa. In the period leading up to the 1945 Liberation, Basso was an active member of the Italian resistance movement and, with Sandro Pertini and Rodolfo Morandi, he set up the covert executive body of the PSIUP in northern Italy (the territory of the Fascist Italian Social Republic), which he had the responsibility for running.

Post-1945, Lelio Basso was elected Vice-secretary of the PSIUP, and, in 1946, became a deputy to the Italian Constituent Assembly which consecrated the Republic. He was on the 75-member Commission that was to write the text of the Italian Constitution, and contributed to the formulation of articles 3 and 49 in particular. From 1946 to 1968, he was consistently elected deputy, and was elected senator in 1972 and 1976.

== PSI-PSIUP split ==
In 1946, he set up the review Quarto Stato, which remained in print until 1950. At the time of the Giuseppe Saragat schism (1947), Basso became Secretary of the PSI, a role he occupied until the Genoa Congress in 1949. In 1950, he was not re-elected to the leading ranks due to his opposing views on the Stalinist leanings of the party at the time. At the 1953 Milan Congress, he was not included in the central committee and was only readmitted in 1955. At the 1957 Venice Congress, he returned to the ruling body. The following year, Basso launched Problemi del Socialismo (still in print today with the new title Parolechiave).

Basso was an active member of the left-wing of the PSI from 1959. In December 1963, he made a voting statement to the Chamber, signed by 24 members of the minority of the Socialist parliamentary group against the first Centre-left government (led by Aldo Moro). This earned him suspension from the party, and, in January 1964, he participated in the constituent assembly of the PSIUP. Basso was one of the leaders of the new party and was its president from 1965 to 1968.

== As lawyer ==
Lelio Basso founded and wrote for a number of international publications. He was famous throughout Europe as a criminal lawyer, and sat in the Russell Tribunal, an international body presided by Bertrand Russell, established to judge American crimes in the Vietnam War. In 1973, he worked to establish a second Russell Tribunal to examine the repression being carried out in Latin America, and worked to set up the Permanent Peoples' Tribunal (established after his death, in 1979). In 1973, he also founded the Fondazione Lelio e Lisli Basso in Rome, and, in 1976, the Fondazione Internazionale and the Lega Internazionale per i Diritti e la Liberazione dei Popoli. He also initiated the Universal Declaration of the Rights of Peoples.

== Works ==
Lelio Basso's life was a medley of intellectual activity and research on the one hand and the search for an effective political instrument on the other, all on an international scale. As an expert and interpreter of the work of Karl Marx, he adopted an original approach in his re-elaboration of the view of Socialism, and drew upon different lines of thought from the sphere of democratic thought in the broadest possible sense (French democratic tradition, German "academic socialism", Italian socialist thought and the Austro-Marxists). During his internment, he read the works of Rosa Luxemburg, and worked tirelessly to promote a critical awareness of her thought in Italy.

Basso wrote a huge number of essays for periodicals and collections. His most important titles include:

- Due totalitarismi: fascismo e democrazia cristiana (1951);
- Il Partito socialista italiano (1956);
- Il principe senza scettro (1958, re-print 1998);
- Da Stalin a Krusciov (1962);
- Introduction and editorship of R. Luxemburg, Scritti politici (1967, re-print: 1970, 1976);
- Neocapitalismo e sinistra europea (1969);
- Introduction and editorship of R. Luxemburg, Lettere alla famiglia Kautsky (1971);
- Rosa Luxemburg: A Reappraisal (London 1975);
- Introduction and editorship of Stato e crisi delle istituzioni (1978);
- Socialismo e rivoluzione (1980);
- Scritti sul cristianesimo (1983).

== Electoral history ==
Election	House	Constituency	Party	Votes	Result
1946	Constituent Assembly	Como–Sondrio–Varese	PSIUP	14,331	Elected
1948	Chamber of Deputies	Milan–Pavia	FDP	43,549	Elected
1953	Chamber of Deputies	Milan–Pavia	PSI	10,102	Elected
1958	Chamber of Deputies	Milan–Pavia	PSI	7,857	Elected
1963	Chamber of Deputies	Milan–Pavia	PSI	6,746	Elected
1968	Chamber of Deputies	Milan–Pavia	PSIUP	6,029	Elected
1972	Senate of the Republic	Lombardy – Milan VI	PSIUP	102,502	Elected
1976	Senate of the Republic	Lombardy – Milan VI	PCI	133,042	Elected
