= Flavio Orlandi =

Italian politician (1921–2009)

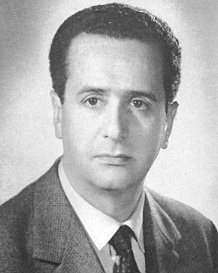

Secretary of the Italian Democratic Socialist Party
- In office June 1972 – June 1975
- Preceded by: Mario Tanassi
- Succeeded by: Mario Tanassi

Member of the Chamber of Deputies
- In office 12 June 1958 – 5 July 1976
- Constituency: Ancona

Member of the European Parliament
- In office 17 July 1979 – 23 July 1984
- Constituency: North-East Italy

Personal details
- Born: 12 April 1921 Canino, Kingdom of Italy
- Died: 8 January 2009 (aged 87) Rome, Italy
- Party: PSDI (1947–1989); UDS (1989); PSI (1989–1994)

Flavio Orlandi (12 April 1921 – 8 January 2009) was a social democrat Italian politician who served at the European Parliament. He was a member of the Italian Democratic Socialist Party (PSDI) and served as its secretary between 1972 and 1975.

== Biography ==
Orlandi was born in Canino on 12 April 1921. During the Second World War he fought for the Italian Resistance as a partisan in the Giustizia e Libertà brigades. After the war he joined the PSDI, a new social-democratic party founded by Giuseppe Saragat as a breakaway from the Italian Socialist Party (PSI), and was first elected to represent Ancona in the Chamber of Deputies in 1958.

In 1966, the PSDI merged with the PSI to form the Unified Socialist Party (PSU). As a result, Orlandi became joint political director of the socialist newspaper Avanti! alongside Gaetano Arfé of the PSI. This arrangement remained until the PSI and PSDI agreed to separate from one another in 1969. Thereafter, he edited the PSDI newspaper L'Umanita for a number of years.

Orlandi was elected national secretary of the PSDI from June 1972, remaining in post until he was replaced by Mario Tanassi three years later. Having left the Chamber of Deputies in 1976, from 1979 to 1984 he represented North-East Italy as a Member of the European Parliament (MEP), where he sat with the socialist group.

In 1989, Orlandi joined the Movement of Unity and Socialist Democracy (Movimento di Unità e Democrazia Socialista; UDS), a new force led by former PSDI leaders Pietro Longo and Pier Luigi Romita. The UDS was intended primarily as a device that would allow secessionists from the PSDI to adhere to the PSI electoral 'area', and in October 1989 its followers (including Orlandi) were absorbed into the PSI en masse.

Orlandi died in Rome on 8 January 2009.

Preceded by Mario Tanassi	Secretary of the Italian Democratic Socialist Party; 1972–1975	Succeeded by Mario Tanassi
