= Universal Declaration of the Rights of Peoples (1976) =

The Universal Declaration of the Rights of Peoples (also known as the Algiers Charter) was adopted in Algiers, July 4, 1976 on the initiative of Lelio Basso. This was at the conclusion of an international conference of jurists, politicians, sociologists, and economists, meeting from 1 July to 4 July at the Palais des Nations in Algiers. They prepared, discussed, and approved a declaration which "consecrates the rights of self-determination, of protection of the environment, of control of natural resources, and of the protection of minorities." It served as a foundational document for the Permanent Peoples' Tribunal.

== Content ==
It contains a preamble with seven sections: Right to Existence, Right to Political Self-determination, Economic Rights of Peoples, Right to Culture, Right to Environment and Common Resources, Rights of Minorities, and Guarantees and Sanctions.
