= Permanent Peoples' Tribunal =

International human rights organization

The Permanent Peoples' Tribunal (PPT) is an international human rights organization founded in Bologna, Italy, on June 24, 1979, at the initiative of Senator Lelio Basso. It was established during the final session of the Russell Tribunal with the aim of condemning Latin American dictatorships. The court is composed of a president, four vice-presidents, a secretary-general and 66 international members. Since its establishment, the Tribunal has conducted more than 50 sessions.

== History ==
The Permanent Peoples' Tribunal (PPT) began in Bologna in 1979, continuing the work of the Russell Tribunal II on Latin American dictatorships. It was founded by Lelio Basso to denounce the crimes committed by military regimes in the region. The PPT aims to encourage action in judicial courts based on intergovernmental treaties, such as the International Criminal Court and the International Court of Justice.

The PPT's work is based on the principles of the Universal Declaration of the Rights of Peoples, proclaimed in Algiers in 1976, and on the main international instruments protecting human rights. The historical and geographical context of the Declaration, known as the Charter of Algiers, links its general principles with liberation struggles, which Resolution 1514 (XV) of the United Nations General Assembly of December 14, 1960 had already placed under the protection of international law, as the right to self-determination remained unfulfilled, and it was not related to the process of decolonization.

== Structure ==
The court is composed of a president, four vice-presidents, a secretary general, a coordination officer, and 58 members from 26 countries, from different disciplines such as law, economy, sociology, arts, and literature.

Table of countries by number of members
Number of members	Countries
1	Australia, Belgium, Cambodia, Chile, Haiti, Ireland, Mexico, Nicaragua, Norway, Palestine, Peru, Portugal, Senegal, Thailand, United Kingdom
2	Ecuador, Germany, The Netherlands, Tunisia
3	Colombia, India
4	Spain
5	France
6	Argentina, United States
8	Italy

== Sessions ==
The Tribunal has held more than 50 sessions on numerous cases of human rights violations. The judgments of the Tribunale Permanente dei Popoli (TPP) rely on sources of existing international law.

=== List of sessions ===
1. Western Sahara (Brussels, 10–11 November 1979)
2. Argentina (Genève, 3–4 May 1980)
3. Eritrea (Milano, 24–26 May 1980)
4. The Philippines and the Bangsamoro people (Anvers, 30 October – 3 November 1980)
5. El Salvador (Mexico, 9–12 February 1981)
6. Afghanistan I (Stockholm, 1–3 May 1981)
7. Afghanistan Il (Paris, 16–20 December 1982)
8. Timor Orientale (Lisbon, 19–21 July 1981)
9. Zaire (Rotterdam, 18–20 September 1982)
10. Guatemala (Madrid, 27–31 January 1983)
11. Armenian Genocide (Paris, 13–16 April 1984)
12. The interventions of the United States in Nicaragua (Brussels, 5–8 October 1984)
13. The policies of the International Monetary Fund and the World Bank I (Berlin, 26–29 September 1988)
14. The policies of the International Monetary Fund and the World Bank II (Madrid, 1–3 October 1994)
15. Puerto Rico (Barcelona, 27–29 January 1989)
16. Brazilian Amazon (Paris, 12–16 October 1990)
17. Impunity for crimes against humanity in Latin America (Bogotá, 22–25 April 1991)
18. The conquest of and international law (Padua-Venice, 5–8 October 1992)
19. Tibet (Strasburg, 16–20 November 1992)
20. Industrial risks and human rights I (Bhopal, 19–23 October 1992)
21. Industrial risks and human rights II (London, 28 November – 2 December 1994)
22. Asylum right in Europe (Berlin, 8–12 December 1994)
23. Crimes against humanity in the former Yugoslavia I (Bern, 17–20 February 1995)
24. Crimes against humanity in the former Yugoslavia II (Barcelona, 7–11 December 1995)
25. Violations of the fundamental rights of children and minors (Trento, 27–29 March; Macerata, 30 March; Napoli 1–4 April 1995)
26. Chernobyl: environment, health and human rights (Vienna, 12–15 April 1996)
27. The rights of workers and consumers in the garment industry (Brussels, 30 April-5 May 1998)
28. Violations of the fundamental rights of children and adolescents in Brazil (São Paulo, 17–19 March 1999)
29. Elf-Aquitaine (Paris, 19–21 May 1999)
30. Global multinationals and "human distorted" (Warwick, 22–23 March 2000)
31. International Law and the new wars (Roma, 14–16 December 2002)
32. Human rights violations in Algeria, 1992–2004 (Paris, 5–8 November 2004)
33. The European Union and transnational corporations in Latin America: policies, instruments and actors complicity in the violation of peoples' rights (Madrid, 14–17 May 2010)
34. The Philippines II (The Hague, 21–25 March 2007)
35. Transnational corporations and the rights of peoples in Colombia (Colombia, 2006–2008)
36. Sri Lanka and the Tamil People I (Dublin, 14–16 January 2010)
37. Session on agrochemical transnational corporations (Bangalore, 3–6 December 2011)
38. Free trade, violence, impunity and people's rights in Mexico (Mexico, 2011–2014)
39. Sri Lanka and the Tamil People II (Bremen, 7–10 December 2013)
40. Session on the Canadian mining transnational corporations (on-going)
41. Fundamental rights, local community participation and infrastructure projects (Torino-Almese, 5–8 November 2015)
42. Living wage for Asian garment workers as fundamental human right (Sri Lanka 2011; Cambodia 2012; India 2012; Indonesia 2014; Sri Lanka 2015)
43. Myanmar's crimes against the Rohingya and Kachin Peoples I (London, 2017)
44. Permanent Peoples Tribunal on Human Rights of Migrant and Refugee Peoples (Launched Barcelona 2017, on-going Session)
45. Session on the violation of human rights of migrants and refugee people (2017–2018)
46. Session on Alleged violations of international law and international humanitarian law by the Turkish Republic and its officials against the Kurdish people and their organizations (Paris 2018)
47. Session on Human Rights, Fracking and Climate Change (May 2018)
48. Session on Political Genocide, Impunity and Crimes Against Peace in Colombia (2020–2021)
49. In defense of the Cerrado territories (2021–2022)
50. Pandemic and authoritarianism. The Bolsonaro government's responsibility for the systematic violations of the fundamental rights of Brazilian peoples perpetrated through the policies imposed in the COVID-19 pandemic (St. Paul, 24–25 May 2022)
51. Session on The Murder of Journalists (Mexico City - The Hague, 2021–2022)
52. Sri Lanka and Tamil People, Third Session (Berlin, 20–22 May 2023)
53. Session on State and Environmental Violence in West Papua (London, 27–29 June 2024)
54. Session on Rojava vs Turkey (Brussels, 5–6 February 2025)
55. Session on Women of Afghanistan (Madrid, October 8–10, 2025)
56. Human rights violations against migrants by the Maghreb States, the European Union and its member States (Palermo, October 23–25, 2025)

== See also ==
- Tibetan sovereignty debate
