= 1972 Italian general election =

- 7 May 1972

All 630 seats in the Chamber of Deputies 316 seats needed for a majority All 315 elective seats in the Senate 162 seats needed for a majority (Note: taking into account the Senators for life, which accounted for 8 seats at the time the election took place)
- Registered: 37,049,351 (C) · 33,739,592 (S)
- Turnout: 34,525,687 (C) · 93.2% (▲0.4 pp); 31,486,399 (S) · 93.3% (▲0.3 pp)
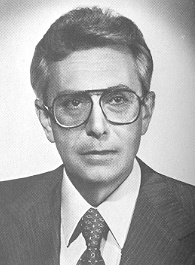

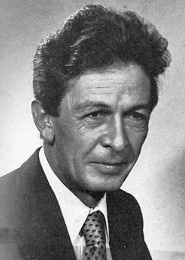

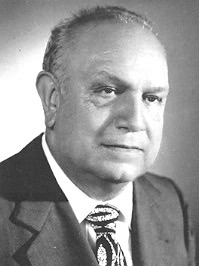

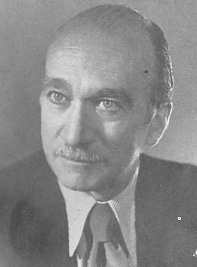

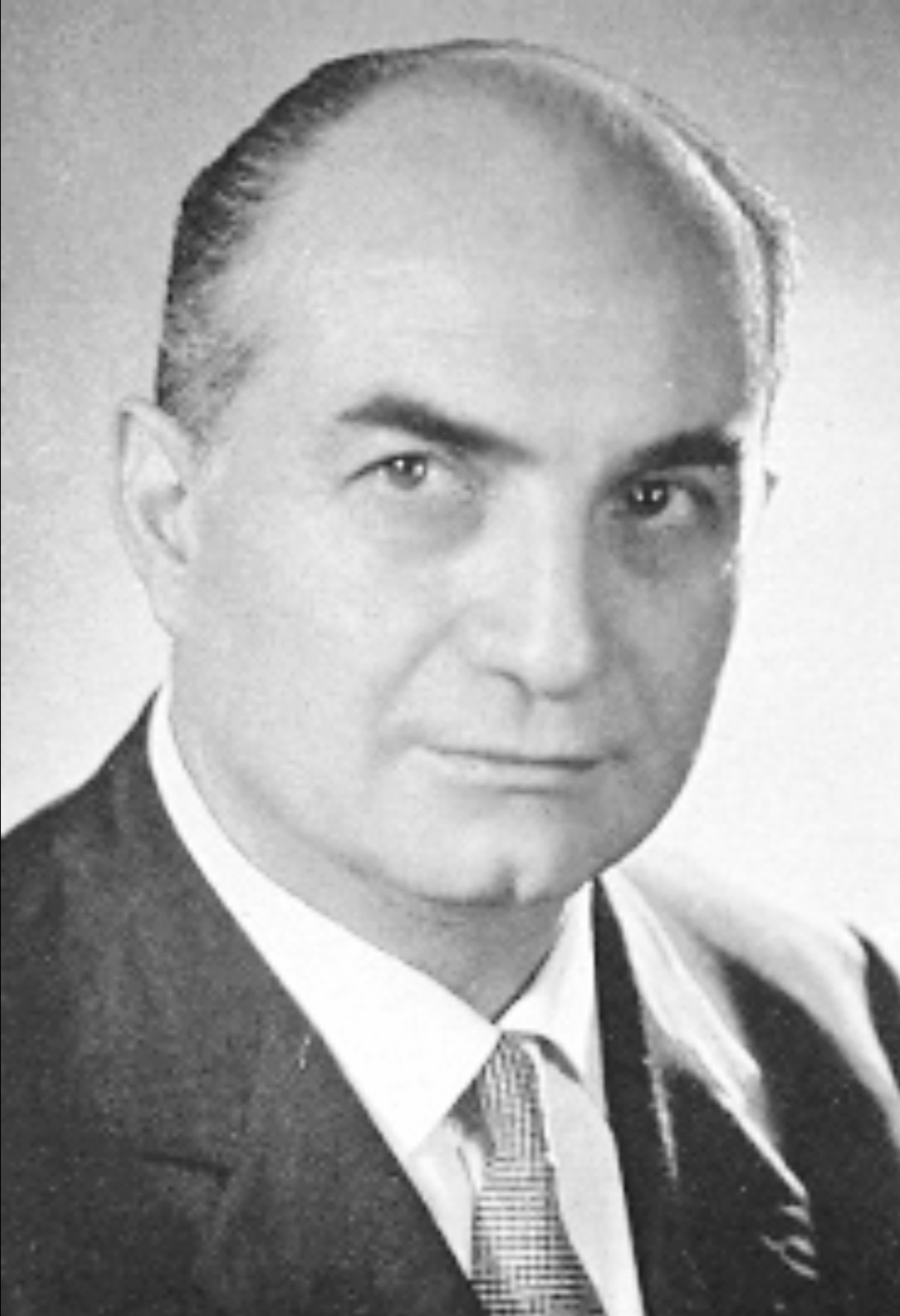

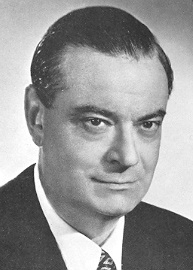
	Majority party	Minority party	Third party
Leader	Arnaldo Forlani	Enrico Berlinguer	Francesco De Martino
Party	DC	PCI	PSI
Leader since	9 November 1969	17 March 1972	13 March 1971 (Note: De Martino also served as secretary from 1963 to 1968 and from 1969 to 1970.)
Leader's seat	Ancona (C)	Rome (C)	Naples (C)
Seats won	266 (C) / 135 (S)	179 (C) / 94 (S) (Note: In a joint list with the PSIUP.)	61 (C) / 33 (S)
Seat change	0 (C) / 0 (S)	▲2 (C) / ▼7 (S)	— (Note: PSI and PSDI ran in a unified list in the 1968 Italian general election.)
Popular vote	12,919,270 (C); 11,465,529 (S)	9,072,454 (C); 8,312,828 (S)	3,210,427 (C); 3,225,707 (S)
Percentage	38.7% (C); 38.1% (S)	27.1% (C); 27.6% (S)	10.0% (C); 10.7% (S)
Swing	▼0.4 pp (C) ▼0.3 pp (S)	▲0.2 pp (C) ▼2.4 pp (S)	—
	Fourth party	Fifth party	Sixth party
Leader	Giorgio Almirante	Mario Tanassi	Giovanni Malagodi
Party	MSI	PSDI	PLI
Leader since	29 June 1969 (Note: Almirante also served as secretary from 1948 to 1950.)	24 February 1972 (Note: Tanassi also served as secretary from 1964 to 1966.)	4 April 1954
Leader's seat	Rome (C)	Rome (C)	Milan (C)
Seats won	56 (C) / 26 (S)	20 (C) / 11 (S)	20 (C) / 8 (S)
Seat change	▲32 (C) / ▲15 (S)	—	▼11 (C) / ▼8 (S)
Popular vote	2,894,722 (C); 2,766,986 (S)	1,718,142 (C); 1,613,810 (S)	1,300,439 (C); 1,319,175 (S)
Percentage	8.7% (C); 9.2% (S)	5.1% (C); 5.4% (S)	3.9% (C); 4.4% (S)
Swing	▲4.2 pp (C) ▲4.6 pp (S)	—	▼1.9 pp (C) ▼2.4 pp (S)
- Results of the election in the Chamber and Senate
Prime Minister before election
Giulio Andreotti
DC
Prime Minister after the election
Giulio Andreotti
DC

The 1972 Italian general election was held in Italy on 7 May 1972. The Christian Democracy (DC) remained stable with around 38% of the votes, as did the Communist Party (PCI) which obtained the same 27% it had in 1968. The Socialist Party (PSI) continued in its decline, reducing to less than 10%. The largest increase in vote share was that of the post-fascist Italian Social Movement, which nearly doubled its votes from 4.5% to about 9%, after its leader Giorgio Almirante launched the formula of the National Right, proposing his party as the sole group of the Italian right wing. After a disappointing result of less than 2%, against the 4.5% of 1968, the Italian Socialist Party of Proletarian Unity was disbanded; a majority of its members joined the PCI.

== Electoral system ==
The electoral system for the Chamber of Deputies was pure party-list proportional representation. Italian provinces were grouped into 32 constituencies, each electing a group of candidates. At constituency level, seats were divided between open lists using the largest remainder method with Imperiali quota. Remaining votes and seats were transferred at national level, where they were divided using the Hare quota, and automatically distributed to best losers into the local lists.

For the Senate, 237 single-seat constituencies were established, even if the assembly had risen to 315 members. The candidates needed a landslide victory of two-thirds of votes to be automatically elected, a goal which could be reached only by the German minorities in South Tirol. All remaining votes and seats were grouped in party lists and regional constituencies, where a D'Hondt method was used: inside the lists, candidates with the best percentages were elected.

== Historical background ==
The period of the late 1960s–1970s came to be known as the Opposti Estremismi, (from left-wing and right-wing extremists riots), later renamed anni di piombo ("years of lead") because of a wave of bombings and shootings — the first victim of this period was Antonio Annarumma, a policeman, killed on 12 November 1969 in Milan during a left-wing demonstration.

In December, four bombings struck the Monument of Vittorio Emanuele II in Rome (Altare della Patria), the Banca Nazionale del Lavoro, and in Milan the Banca Commerciale and the Banca Nazionale dell'Agricoltura. The latter bombing, known as the Piazza Fontana bombing of 12 December 1969, killed 17 and injured 88.

Communist Secretary Luigi Longo suffered a stroke in late 1968; although partially recovering in the following months, from February 1969 he was assisted in most decisions by Enrico Berlinguer acting as cive-secretary. Longo resigned the position of party secretary in 1972, supporting the choice of Berlinguer as his successor.

Berlinguer's unexpected stance made waves: he gave the strongest speech by a major Communist leader ever heard in Moscow. He refused to "excommunicate" the Chinese communists, and directly told Leonid Brezhnev that the invasion of Czechoslovakia by the Warsaw Pact countries (which he termed the "tragedy in Prague") had made clear the considerable differences within the Communist movement on fundamental questions such as national sovereignty, socialist democracy, and the freedom of culture.

Arturo Michelini, leader of the Italian Social Movement, died in 1969, and the party's first and charismatic leader Giorgio Almirante regained control. He attempted to revitalise the party by pursuing an aggressive policy against left-wing student uprisings; the 1968 student movement had been devastating for the party's youth organisation. Following Michelini's failed approach of inserimento, Almirante introduced a double strategy of hard anti-systemic discourse combined with the creation of a broader "National Right" (Destra Nazionale) coalition.

== Parties and leaders ==
Party	Ideology	Leader	Seats in 1968		
Party	Ideology	Leader	C	S	Total
Christian Democracy (DC)	Christian democracy	Arnaldo Forlani	266	135	401
Italian Communist Party (PCI)	Communism	Enrico Berlinguer	177	101	278
Italian Socialist Party (PSI)	Democratic socialism	Francesco De Martino	61	33	94
Italian Liberal Party (PLI)	Conservative liberalism	Giovanni Malagodi	31	16	47
Italian Social Movement (MSI)	Neo-fascism	Giorgio Almirante	30	13	43
Italian Democratic Socialist Party (PSDI)	Social democracy	Mauro Ferri	29	10	39
Italian Republican Party (PRI)	Liberalism	Ugo La Malfa	9	2	11

== Results ==
Mathematically, the election seemed to give the same results of four years before, the three major parties receiving quite the same preferences. However, the success of the operation of the National Right by MSI, gave a golden share to the PSI, because the Christian Democrats had no more possibilities to look at their right to build a democratic government, the alliance with the Socialists becoming quite obliged. Incumbent Prime Minister Giulio Andreotti tried to continue his centrist strategy, but his attempt only lasted a year. Former Premier Mariano Rumor so returned at the head of the government with his traditional centre-left alliance between DC, PSI, PSDI and PRI, but he was abandoned by the Republicans after eight months. He continued with a new squad, but he couldn't withstand the shocks deriving by the divorce referendum of 1974. After the consequent great controversies between Catholics and secularists, former Premier Aldo Moro persuaded the Socialists to accept a minority government composed only of the Christian Democrats and the Republicans. However, new problem arose from the regional elections of 1975, which marked a great success of the left, which consequently called for new national elections. When the Republicans too left Moro in 1976, no possibilities of a new government remained, and an early general election was found necessary.

=== Chamber of Deputies ===
← Summary of the 7 May 1972 Chamber of Deputies election results →
Party	Votes	%	Seats	+/−
Christian Democracy (DC)	12,912,466	38.66	266	±0
Italian Communist Party (PCI)	9,068,961	27.15	179	+2
Italian Socialist Party (PSI)	3,208,497	9.61	61	–
Italian Social Movement (MSI)	2,894,722	8.67	56	+32
Italian Democratic Socialist Party (PSDI)	1,718,142	5.14	29	–
Italian Liberal Party (PLI)	1,300,439	3.89	20	−11
Italian Republican Party (PRI)	954,357	2.86	15	+6
Italian Socialist Party of Proletarian Unity (PSIUP)	648,591	1.94	0	−23
The Manifesto (IM)	224,313	0.67	0	New
South Tyrolean People's Party (SVP)	153,674	0.46	3	±0
Workers' Political Movement (MPL)	120,251	0.36	0	New
Italian (Marxist–Leninist) Communist Party (PCM–LI)	86,038	0.26	0	New
DC – UV – RV – PSDI	34,083	0.10	1	+1
Others	79,014	0.26	0	±0
Invalid/blank votes	1,122,139	–	–	–
Total	34,525,687	100	630	±0
Registered voters/turnout	37,049,351	93.19	–	–
Source: Ministry of the Interior

Popular vote
DC	38.66%
PCI	27.15%
PSI	9.61%
MSI	8.67%
PSDI	5.14%
PLI	3.89%
PRI	2.86%
PSIUP	1.94%
Others	2.09%

Seats
DC	42.22%
PCI	28.41%
PSI	9.68%
MSI	8.89%
PSDI	4.60%
PLI	3.17%
PRI	2.38%
Others	0.63%

==== Results by constituency ====
Constituency	Total seats	Seats won							
Constituency	Total seats	DC	PCI	PSI	MSI	PSDI	PLI	PRI	Others
Turin	34	12	10	4	2	2	3	1	
Cuneo	14	7	3	2		1	1		
Genoa	22	8	7	3	1	1	1	1	
Milan	45	16	13	6	3	2	3	2	
Como	17	9	3	2	1	1	1		
Brescia	20	12	3	2	1	1	1		
Mantua	8	4	3	1					
Trentino	10	5	1	1					3
Verona	28	17	5	2	1	1	1	1	
Venice	18	9	4	2	1	1	1		
Udine	14	7	3	2	1	1			
Bologna	27	7	12	2	1	2	1	2	
Parma	20	6	9	2	1	1	1		
Florence	16	5	8	1	1	1			
Pisa	16	6	6	1	1	1		1	
Siena	9	3	5	1					
Ancona	17	7	6	1	1	1		1	
Perugia	11	4	5	1	1				
Rome	48	17	13	4	7	3	2	2	
L'Aquila	15	8	4	1	1	1			
Campobasso	4	3	1						
Naples	38	14	10	3	7	2	1	1	
Benevento	23	11	4	2	3	1	1	1	
Bari	24	10	7	3	3	1			
Lecce	18	9	5	2	2				
Potenza	8	5	2	1					
Catanzaro	24	10	7	3	3	1			
Catania	30	12	7	2	6	1	1	1	
Palermo	30	13	7	3	4	1	1	1	
Cagliari	17	8	5	1	2	1			
Aosta Valley	1								1
Trieste	4	2	1		1				
Total	630	266	179	61	56	29	20	15	4

=== Senate of the Republic ===
← Summary of the 7 May 1972 Senate of the Republic election results →
Party	Votes	%	Seats	+/−
Christian Democracy (DC)	11,465,529	38.07	135	±0
Italian Communist Party – PSIUP (PCI–PSIUP)	8,312,828	27.60	91	−10
Italian Socialist Party (PSI)	3,225,707	10.71	33	–
Italian Social Movement (MSI)	2,766,986	9.19	26	+15
Italian Democratic Socialist Party (PSDI)	1,613,810	5.36	11	–
Italian Liberal Party (PLI)	1,319,175	4.38	8	−8
Italian Republican Party (PRI)	918,440	3.05	5	+3
PCI – PSIUP – PSd'Az	189,534	0.63	3	±0
SVP – PPTT	113,452	0.38	2	±0
PCI – PSIUP – PSI	41,833	0.14	0	±0
PSDI – PRI	31,953	0.11	0	±0
DC – UV – RV – PSDI	28,735	0.10	1	+1
Tyrol	31,114	0.10	0	New
Others	56,961	0.19	0	±0
Invalid/blank votes	2,243,869	–	–	–
Total	31,486,399	100	315	±0
Registered voters/turnout	33,923,895	92.7	–	–
Source: Ministry of the Interior

Popular vote
DC	38.07%
PCI–PSIUP	27.60%
PSI	10.71%
MSI	9.19%
PSDI	5.36%
PLI	4.38%
PRI	3.05%
Others	1.64%

Seats
DC	42.86%
PCI–PSIUP	28.89%
PSI	10.48%
MSI	8.25%
PSDI	3.48%
PLI	2.54%
PRI	1.59%
Others	1.90%

==== Results by constituency ====
Constituency	Total seats	Seats won							
Constituency	Total seats	DC	PCI–PSIUP	PSI	MSI	PSDI	PLI	PRI	Others
Piedmont	24	9	7	3	1	2	2		
Aosta Valley	1								1
Lombardy	45	20	12	6	2	2	2	1	
Trentino-Alto Adige	7	5							2
Veneto	23	14	4	2	1	1	1		
Friuli-Venezia Giulia	7	4	2	1					
Liguria	11	5	5	1					
Emilia-Romagna	22	6	11	2	1	1		1	
Tuscany	20	7	9	2	1	1			
Umbria	7	3	3	1					
Marche	8	4	3	1					
Lazio	24	8	7	2	4	1	1	1	
Abruzzo	7	4	2	1					
Molise	2	2							
Campania	29	11	7	3	5	1	1	1	
Apulia	21	9	6	2	3	1			
Basilicata	7	4	2	1					
Calabria	12	5	4	1	2				
Sicily	29	11	7	3	5	1	1	1	
Sardinia	9	4		1	1				3
Total	315	135	91	33	26	11	8	5	6

== Maps ==

Seat distribution by constituency for the Chamber of Deputies (left) and Senate (right).
