= Edoardo Catellani =

Italian politician (1922–2019)

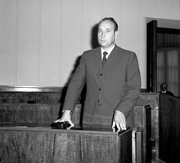
Edoardo Catellani

Edoardo Catellani (24 July 1922 – 10 July 2019) was an Italian politician who served in the Senate from 1968 to 1979, representing the Unified Socialist Party and the Italian Socialist Party. He died in 2019 from a heart problem.
