= Movement for Piedmontese Regional Autonomy =

Italian regionalist political party

The Movement for Piedmontese Regional Autonomy (Italian: Movimento per l'Autonomia Regionale Piemontese, MARP) was a regionalist political party active in Piedmont, Italy, in support of Piedmontese regional autonomy. Also known as the Marploni, it was one of the precursors of Lega Piemonte (Piedmont League) and Piemonte Autonomista (Autonomist Piedmont) and thus of Lega Nord (Northern League).

The MARP was founded in 1955 in Turin by a group of Piedmontese autonomists led by Enrico Villarboito. It was originally conceived as a transparty organisation aimed at fighting for Piedmontese regional autonomy within Italian unity according to the Constitution of Italy. As such, it was open to people from all political parties and backgrounds, and the MARP became soon a party among parties. In 1956, it was the fifth most voted party in Turin, electing four municipal councillors, and elected a councillor also to the council of the province of Turin. Although the party was soon disbanded, it was a model for many regionalist parties in Northern Italy.
