= Arturo Michelini =

Italian politician (1909–1969)

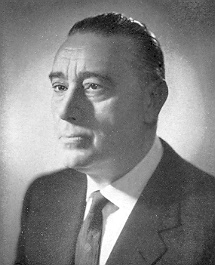

Secretary of the Italian Social Movement
- In office 10 October 1954 – 15 June 1969
- Preceded by: Augusto De Marsanich
- Succeeded by: Giorgio Almirante

Member of the Chamber of Deputies
- In office 8 May 1948 – 15 June 1969
- Constituency: Italy at-large (1948–1953); Rome (1953–1969)

Personal details
- Born: 17 February 1909 Florence, Kingdom of Italy
- Died: 15 June 1969 (aged 60) Rome, Italy
- Party: MSI (1954–1969)
- Other political affiliations: PNF (1935–1943); PFR (1943–1945)
- Height: 1.82 m (6 ft 0 in)
- Occupation: Accountant, politician
- Awards: Silver Medal of Military Valor

Arturo Michelini (17 February 1909 – 15 June 1969) was an Italian politician and secretary of the Italian Social Movement (MSI). A minor party official during the days of Italian fascism and a war veteran, Michelini emerged as one of the two leading figures in the MSI during the 1950s and 1960s, representing the moderate tendency of the party against the nostalgic fascist tendency.

== Early years ==
Michelini was born in Florence. An accountant by profession, he was a lower to middle-ranking figure in the National Fascist Party, rising to become secretary of the party in Rome. Michelini, a pro-Franco veteran of the Spanish Civil War, served with the army on the Eastern Front during the Second World War. He was twice wounded in action and decorated with the Silver Medal of Military Valor for his efforts. He did not hold office in the Italian Social Republic.

== Leadership of the MSI ==
Michelini emerged as a leading figure in the neo-fascism strain of Italian politics that emerged immediately after the war and was a prominent figure in the foundation of the MSI. He was elected to the Chamber of Deputies for Rome at the 1948 election as one of the new party's six representatives. He emerged as leader of the MSI in 1954 in succession to Augusto De Marsanich and sought to moderate the party's neo-fascism in an attempt to bring it more into the political mainstream, an endeavour in which he largely failed. He was linked to financial powers in Rome as well as the Vatican City who sought to move the MSI away from its Third Position rhetoric into more conservative ideals.

Michelini's policies helped to push some of the more radical elements out of the party and into such fringe groups as Avanguardia Nazionale and Ordine Nuovo. In general he disliked the unconstitutional methods of such minor groups and was the dominant figure in the "realist" tendency within the party, supporting co-operation with NATO and moves to build a pan-right alliance with the Christian Democrats and Monarchists. In this regard he faced regular internal opposition, notably from Giorgio Almirante as well as other radicals such as Ezio Maria Gray, Massimo Anderson and Pino Romualdi who all wanted the basis of the MSI to be the charter issued by the 1943 Congress of Verona. As political editor of Secolo d'Italia, Michelini was able to ensure that his position was that most widely disseminated.

Despite these attempts at moderation the MSI lost support under Michelini's leadership, dropping from 5.8% in the 1953 general election to 4.9% in the 1958 election. Michelini however was a skilled negotiator and adept at the internal politics of the MSI and at the 8th party congress in June 1965 when the pro-fascist wing formed a majority for the first time under his leadership he was able to remain in position by virtue of concluding a private deal with their leader Almirante. In this respect he was able to retain the leadership of the MSI until his death in 1969, at which point Almirante took over.

== Electoral history ==
Election	House	Constituency	Party	Votes	Result
1948	Chamber of Deputies	Italy at-large	MSI	– (Note: Elected in a closed list proportional representation system.)	Elected
1953	Chamber of Deputies	Rome–Viterbo–Latina–Frosinone	MSI	27,383	Elected
1958	Chamber of Deputies	Rome–Viterbo–Latina–Frosinone	MSI	40,499	Elected
1963	Chamber of Deputies	Rome–Viterbo–Latina–Frosinone	MSI	88,901	Elected
1968	Chamber of Deputies	Rome–Viterbo–Latina–Frosinone	MSI	77,832	Elected
