= Italian (Marxist–Leninist) Communist Party =

Union of Italian Communists (Marxist–Leninist) Unione dei Comunisti Italiani (marxisti-leninisti)
- Abbreviation: UCI(m-l)
- General Secretaries: Aldo Brandirali
- Founded: 1968 (as Union of Italian Communists (Marxist–Leninist)); 1972 (as Italian (Marxist–Leninist) Communist Party)
- Dissolved: 1978
- Newspaper: Servire il Popolo; La Voce Operaia
- Youth wing: Union of Communist Youth in Service of the People
- Ideology: Communism; Marxism–Leninism; Maoism
- Colours: Red

Union of Italian Communists (Marxist–Leninist) (Italian: Unione dei Comunisti Italiani (marxisti-leninisti)) was a pro-Chinese communist group in Italy. The UCI (m-l) was founded in Rome on 4 October 1968. Its main organ was Servire il popolo. The main leaders of UCI (m-l) were Aldo Brandirali, Enzo Todeschini, Angelo Arvati and Enzo Lo Giudice.

After a schism at the end of 1970, the main group of the leaders moved from Rome to Milan.

On 15 April 1972 the UCI (m-l) was transformed into Italian (Marxist–Leninist) Communist Party (Partito Comunista (marxista-leninista) Italiano). With the appearance of the Leninist poet Francesco Leonetti in the party, the theoretical organ of PC (m-l)I became known as Che fare.

The PC(m-l)I had a front organization amongst Italians in West Germany, the Federazione Italiani Lavoratori Emigrati, 'Union of Italian Migrant Workers'.

The PC(m-l)I was dissolved in 1978, and its remaining adherents largely became involved in Autonomia Operaia.

The youth wing of the organization was called: Union of Communist Youth in Service of the People.
