= Mauro Ferri =

Italian politician

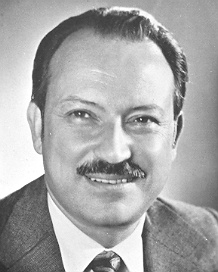
Mauro Ferri

Mauro Ferri (15 March 1920 – 29 September 2015) was an Italian politician and judge.

He was a member of the Italian Socialist Party (PSI) from 1944 to 1969, when he switched affiliations to the Italian Democratic Socialist Party (PSDI). He was the Italian Minister of Economic Development from 1972 to 1973 in Prime Minister Giulio Andreotti's second cabinet. Ferri was elected as a Member of European Parliament in 1979 and served until 1984. He then served as President of the Constitutional Court of Italy from 1995 to 1996. Ferri died in his hometown of Rome on 29 September 2015.

Preceded by Mario Tanassi	Secretary of the Italian Democratic Socialist Party; 1969–1972	Succeeded by Mario Tanassi
