= Unified Socialist Party (Italy) =

Italian political party

Unified Socialist Party Partito Socialista Unificato
- Leaders: Pietro Nenni; Giuseppe Saragat
- Secretaries: Francesco De Martino; Mario Tanassi; Mauro Ferri (from 1968)
- Deputy Secretaries: Giacomo Brodolini; Antonio Cariglia
- President: Pietro Nenni
- Founded: 30 October 1966
- Dissolved: 7 July 1969
- Newspaper: Avanti! L'Umanità
- Ideology: Democratic socialism Social democracy
- Political position: Centre-left
- International affiliation: Socialist International

The Unified Socialist Party (Italian: Partito Socialista Unificato), officially called Unified PSI–PSDI (PSI–PSDI Unificati), was the name of the federation of parties formed by the Italian Socialist Party (PSI) and the Italian Democratic Socialist Party (PSDI) from 1966 to 1969. The parties' membership was composed of 700,964 activists in 1966.

== Early history ==
The two parties joined forces in October 1966, after the PSI had entered the Italian government in 1963 for the first time in sixteen years as part of Aldo Moro's 'centre-left' (centrosinistra) cabinets, composed of Christian Democracy (DC), the Italian Republican Party (PRI), and the PSDI. The main focus of this new coalition was to empower the Italian centre-left to the extent that it would become the main alternative to the DC as a ruling force, and not just its minor partner in government; indeed, the PSI leader Pietro Nenni had spoken frequently of his ambition to turn a unified socialist party into the Italian version of the British Labour Party (while Labour, according to Ilaria Favretto, returned the compliment by vocally supporting unification). Nenni, seen as the "driving force" behind unification, was made co-leader of the new party along with the President of the Republic, Giuseppe Saragat of the PSDI. Both men were viewed by others in the party as seeking unity in order to embellish their own individual legacies.

Due to the difficulties inherent in marrying two parties with separate customs and organisational practices, it was agreed when merger talks commenced that the PSI and PSDI would maintain their own separate structures for a period of two years, to allow for a harmonious transfer of power from the old apparatus to the new and also to alleviate any suspicions from either side about possible domination by the other. This agreement also allowed for parity of representation between the PSI and PSDI throughout the two-year transitional period on all party bodies, such as the Central Committee, National Directorate and local executive committees; in practice, this not only ensured overrepresentation of the social democratic minority, but also benefitted those socialists – namely Nenni and his followers – who were most prepared to court them.

And yet matters still did not proceed smoothly. By creating this 'dyarchic' framework, the new party increased the scope for complexity and diffusion (or evasion) of responsibility. In particular, the practice of endowing every party office of any importance with two heads (one PSI, one PSDI) led, in the opinion of one foreign observer, "to friction and inefficiency and at worst to near paralysis". At a local level, the two components continued to uphold their existing positions whether in power or in opposition, remaining separate from each other regardless of the fact that they were now supposed to be unified, with campaign literature often favouring one candidate over another. Meanwhile, a small tranche of the PSDI core, who organised under the banner of "Social Democracy", agitated openly against unity and abandoned the party once it became apparent their efforts would prove futile; departees included Pietro Bucalossi, the powerful Mayor of Milan (who had already displayed his scepticism by abstaining when the socialist unification project was put to the vote at the PSDI congress in 1965).

== Electoral results ==
The united party achieved 14.5% of the vote in the 1968 Italian general election, which was considerably less than the sum total of 19.9% for its constituent parts (13.8% for the PSI and 6.1% for the PSDI) recorded at the 1963 general election – a decline, in fact, of over one and half million votes, or 25% of the 1963 total. This rather unexpected outcome destroyed the optimism of many in the party at a stroke: it was reported that Giuseppe Saragat kicked his television set in frustration as the results were coming in. The party's deterioration was due in part to the competition arising from the Italian Socialist Party of Proletarian Unity (PSIUP), a detachment from the left wing of the PSI that had emerged four years earlier. But even when the PSIUP's vote share was fully accounted for there was still a net loss of 113,735 votes, leading some to conclude that a prevailing factor in the unified party's disappointing performance was the unimpressive record of the outgoing centre-left government and the deflating experience of the PSI–PSDI inside it.

Only 91 PSI–PSDI candidates were elected to the Chamber of Deputies in 1968, three fewer than what the PSI alone still had when the previous parliament was dissolved (and 29 fewer than what the two parties achieved collectively in 1963). Of these, 33 deputies (36.2%) were PSDI in origin while the remaining 58 hailed from the PSI. This relative imbalance (in a party where only 26.5% of the membership had previously belonged to the PSDI) was attributed by Felice Rizzi to the social democrats' greater ability to harness preferential votes and also to the patronage afforded to their clientelistic vote base, which was maintained by "the many public offices [the PSDI] filled."

== Factionalism ==
Five months after the election, in October 1968, the party's leaders convened a joint congress at the Palazzo dei Congressi in Rome to establish its future direction, with discordant views emerging over whether or not to return to a governmental coalition with the DC and the lay centre-left or instead move towards embracing the Italian Communist Party (PCI). These contrasting viewpoints had already taken concrete form before the congress was held, with the emergence of five competing intra-party factions. These were, from left to right:

- Socialist Left (Sinistra Socialista). Led by Riccardo Lombardi, this was the most uncompromisingly left-wing element of the PSI–PSDI coalition. Many of its adherents were revolutionary socialists, who viewed the centrosinistra governments as a failed experiment that should not be repeated. Arguing that the objective of the PSI was to create a socialist society that would, by necessity, involve the entire Italian left, the lombardiani held a more positive view towards the PCI than any other faction, maintaining that its evolving, pluralist identity had separated it from the Soviet Union and could be put at the service of a broader 'New Left' arrangement, guided by the PSI and involving other 'progressive' parties such as the PRI and the PSIUP. The lombardiani were, however, antagonistic towards the ex-PSDI section of the party, whose leading figures they often characterised as scheming careerists.
- Socialist Commitment (Impegno Socialista). Also assertively left-wing and the smallest of the five tendencies, this faction was led by ex-communist Antonio Giolitti. As with the lombardiani, they favoured a united left that would accommodate the PCI. However, they also argued for a continuation of the centre-left governments but believed that they should first be radically reconfigured, with the socialists emerging in this scenario as a channel for grassroots activism and workers' power, thus moving beyond the focus on centralised piecemeal reform that had hitherto characterised centrosinistra governance.
- Recovery and Socialist Unity (Riscossa e Unità Socialista). This faction was the fiefdom of Francesco De Martino, one of the united party's two secretaries (representing the PSI element). Like the Impegno faction, the demartiniani believed that PSI participation in centre-left governments should only come after a rejuvenating spell in opposition, and that the party's key purpose should be to further socialist progress rather than to hold ministries in an unambitious government of "national stability" (an implicit criticism of the Autonomy and Renewal factions). This group was pluralistic in its attitude and thus opposed breaking relationships with communists in the trade unions, reflecting the fact that it derived a large element of its support from party activists affiliated to the Italian General Confederation of Labour (CGIL), which contained both socialists and communists.
- Socialist Autonomy (Autonomia Socialista). The autonomisti were a tendency on the right wing of the PSI that had existed prior to the creation of the unified party. Their champion was Pietro Nenni, veteran leader of the party, and they shared his apprehension of the communists – sustained, in Nenni's case, since the Soviet invasion of Hungary in 1956 – alongside a concomitant support for the PSI's turn to the moderate left. Socialist Autonomy was therefore the only faction to be outrightly supportive of immediate negotiations for a new centre-left government, which its leaders claimed was necessary in order to prevent the DC from allying with the reactionary right. Unlike the Riscossa, Impegno and Sinistra factions to their left, which were either wholly or predominantly PSI in their composition, the autonomisti included a noticeable minority of ex-PSDI cadres, who mostly derived from that party's left-wing and trade union flanks (among the latter category was Italo Viglianesi, general secretary of the Italian Labour Union). The autonomist group was led by Mauro Ferri, who was close to Nenni, while a sub-faction emerged that was headed by Giacomo Mancini.
- Socialist Renewal (Rinnovamento Socialista). The most conservative and managerialist current, it was composed of former PSDI members and thus sometimes appeared to outsiders as a party within a party. Its leader was Mario Tanassi, the unified party's joint secretary (alongside De Martino) and widely regarded as "the voice of President Saragat in party affairs". Like the Riscossa faction (but unlike the autonomisti), Socialist Renewal refused to advocate an immediate return to centre-left government, although they believed that such a government was the only way to ensure long-term stability and to demonstrate the responsibility of socialists when in office. There the mutual agreement ended, as unlike the Riscossa bloc (and the other leftist groups) this faction was hostile to any coalition involving communists, not just on the national stage but at a local level. The Renewal faction was also suspicious of the PSI left, and – despite its proclaimed support for socialist unity as a way of finally healing the age old-cleft in Italian socialism between maximalism and reformism – in private many adherents remained sceptical of the merits of unification.

At the congress, Ferri's autonomist faction prevailed narrowly over the others, receiving 35.5% of the votes cast by the membership when electing the party's Central Committee, ahead of De Martino's Riscossa group (at 32.2%), Tanassi's Socialist Renewal (17.3%), Lombardi's Socialist Left (9.1%) and Giolitti's Impegno faction (5.7%). In most respects, this result was unsurprising: Socialist Autonomy was the home of Nenni, the PSI's still popular figurehead, and was thus always likely to command a significant section of the vote; it was the only tendency unambiguously in favour of resuming participation in a new centrosinistra government, whereas those opposed found their support scattered across the other factions; and as the sole PSI-led faction to have recruited substantially from among the PSDI membership bloc it was also the embodiment of unity in practice. Yet the relatively strong showing achieved by the demartiniani demonstrates the limitations of the autonomista standpoint, indicating that there were a sizeable number of members who had held deep misgivings about the centre-left government and its lack of socialist initiative without feeling the need to opt for either the overtly radical-idealist lombardiani or obscure Impegno group.

The faction that was probably the most damaged by the Central Committee election was Socialist Renewal. Previously, the PSDI had taken 50% of the seats on the Central Committee as a consequence of the equal split of appointments during the "dyarchy"; now, with just 17.3% of the votes, its representative faction could not even lay claim to the loyalties of all social democrats. However, it still shared many similarities with Socialist Autonomy, most notably in its cautious pragmatism, anti-communism and unwillingness to work in government with any political formation to the left of the Catholics and Republicans. Realising this, the two groups quickly designed a joint platform of 'reunification', which commanded a fragile majority of 52.6% of the membership vote and 64 seats out of 121 on the Committee. On 10 November 1968 the Central Committee elected Mauro Ferri as secretary of the party, with the votes coming from the currents of Autonomy and Renewal. For the next six months this coalition controlled the party much as Nenni and the social democrats had done in the early days of merger, and given their approval of centrosinistra politics at a national level it was no surprise that the PSI–PSDI was soon back in alliance with the DC in government.

== Fragmentation ==
The PSI–PSDI adopted the name "Socialist Party - Italian Section of the Socialist International" at the 1968 congress, much to the chagrin of the ex-PSDI contingent. Of greater significance, however, was the split in the ruling Socialist Autonomy faction, following the defection in April 1969 of Giacomo Mancini and his followers to De Martino's Riscossa group. This weakened Autonomy to such an extent that it could no longer command the majority it had fashioned in tandem with Tanassi's Socialist Renewal current. Their fall from grace meant that control within the unified party was now exclusively wielded by those who had once belonged to the PSI, with no place for the ex-PSDI bloc that dwelt within the Autonomy and Renewal camps. Although Pietro Nenni – who had stayed with Autonomy – attempted to heal the resulting divisions, it soon became clear that a significant minority were so enflamed by what had happened that they were determined to leave the party, and on 7 July 1969 29 of the Unified PSI–PSDI's 91 deputies (and 11 senators) did just that. Almost all of the schismatics had previously belonged to the PSDI, aside from a few ex-PSI autonomisti – most notably the faction's leader Mauro Ferri and Nenni's secretary Pietro Longo – whose anger at Mancini's betrayal had prompted them to join the defectors. (Conversely, those syndicalist PSDI activists who had chosen Autonomy rather than Renewal, led by Italo Viglianesi, opted to remain in their new party.) The splitters christened their breakaway group the "United Socialist Party", before bowing to logic and embracing their old name of PSDI in 1971.

== Composition ==
Party	Main ideology	Leader/s
Italian Socialist Party	Democratic socialism	Pietro Nenni
Italian Democratic Socialist Party	Social democracy	Giuseppe Saragat

== Electoral results ==
=== Italian Parliament ===
Chamber of Deputies
Election year	Votes	%	Seats	+/–	Leader
1968	4,603,192 (3rd)	14.48	91 / 630	–	Pietro Nenni

Senate of the Republic
Election year	Votes	%	Seats	+/–	Leader
1968	4,354,906 (3rd)	15.22	46 / 315	–	Pietro Nenni
