= Mario Martinelli =

Italian politician (1906–2001)

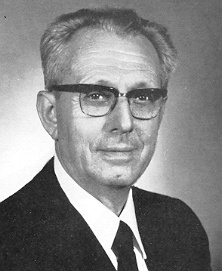
Mario Martinelli

Mario Martinelli (12 May 1906 – 21 May 2001) was an Italian resistance member during the Fascist Italy and a conservative politician who was a member of Christian Democracy. He was the undisputed leader of the party in the Como region. He held several government posts and was a long-term member of the Italian Parliament, Italian Senate and the European Parliament.

== Biography ==
Martinelli was born in Como on 12 May 1906. His father, Abbondio, was a dyer worker and trade unionist and was among the founders of Italian People's Party which was established in 1919. Mario Martinelli was an accountant by profession. He was a member of the resistance movement during the Fascist Italy. Martinelli was arrested by the political police at his home in Como in August 1944 due to his resistance activities and released in April 1945.

Following the end of World War II he joined the Christian Democrat Party and founded its Como branch. He served as the party secretary for the Como region between 1945 and 1946. Then he elected to the Italian parliament in 1946 and became a member of the national council of the Christian Democrat Party in 1948. His tenure at the parliament lasted for three consecutive terms, and the last and fourth one was at the end of the 1970s. After serving as undersecretary of state for treasury and for foreign trade and minister of finance he was appointed minister of foreign trade which he held from 1954 to 1955. He served in the same post between 1960 and 1962.

From 1958 Martinelli served in the European Parliament as part of the Christian Democrat group and was the head of the transport committee. He was also a member of the committee on the internal market of the community at the European Parliament. Martinelli also served at the Italian Senate from 1963 for three consecutive terms representing Lombardy.

Martinelli was married and had nine children. He died on 21 May 2001.

== Legacy ==
In Como a square was named after him, Mario Martinelli Square. In 2004 Giovanni Di Capua published a biography of Mario Martinelli entitled Mario Martinelli nel secolo delle contraddizioni (Italian: Mario Martinelli in the century of contradictions).
