= Italian Socialist Party of Proletarian Unity =

Defunct socialist party in Italy

Italian Socialist Party of Proletarian Unity Partito Socialista Italiano di Unità Proletaria
- Abbreviation: PSIUP
- President: Lelio Basso
- General Secretary: Tullio Vecchietti
- Spokesperson: Dario Valori
- Founded: 12 January 1964
- Dissolved: 13 July 1972
- Split from: Italian Socialist Party
- Merged into: Italian Communist Party
- Newspaper: Mondo nuovo
- Membership (1970): 200,000
- Ideology: Socialism; Marxism; Frontism; Factions; Pro-Soviet Union; Pro-Castro; Pro-China; Revolutionary socialism Libertarian socialism
- Political position: Far-left
- Colours: Red

Party flag

The Italian Socialist Party of Proletarian Unity (Partito Socialista Italiano di Unità Proletaria, PSIUP) was a political party in Italy, active from 1964 to 1972.

== History ==
The PSIUP was formed on 12 January 1964 by a leftist section of the Italian Socialist Party (PSI). PSIUP had been the PSI's name in 1943–1947. The new PSIUP was led by Tullio Vecchietti. Other leading members were Lelio Basso, Vittorio Foa, Lucio Libertini, Emilio Lussu, Francesco Cacciatore detto Cecchino and Dario Valori. The new party attracted PSI militants who were dissatisfied with the close cooperation between the PSI and the Christian Democracy. Instead, the founders of the PSIUP favoured cooperation with the Italian Communist Party (PCI).

On 13 July 1972, following a disappointing electoral result, the PSIUP split. The majority, led by Libertini, Valori and Vecchietti, joined the PCI. The rightist minority, led by Giuseppe Avolio, Nicola Corretto and Vincenzo Gatto, rejoined the PSI. The leftist minority, led by Foa and Silvano Miniati, continued to work under the name PSIUP, and in December 1972 they established the Proletarian Unity Party (PdUP). A Posadist faction within the PSIUP published the Bollettino della sinistra rivoluzionaria del PSIUP between 1965 and 1967.

The PSIUP included former young left-wing socialists who would later hold important positions in the PCI: Fausto Bertinotti, Alba Sasso, Roberto Speciale, Giacomo Princigalli, Peppino Trulli, Peppino Caldarola, Domenico Ceravolo, Giuseppe Pupillo. On the other hand, Giuliano Amato, Giuseppe Avolio, Nicola Corretto, Vincenzo Gatto, Biagio Marzo and Emanuele Ceglie joined the PSI.

== Electoral results ==
=== Italian Parliament ===
Chamber of Deputies
Election year	Votes	%	Seats	+/−	Leader
1968	1,414,697 (5th)	4.5	23 / 630	–	Tullio Vecchietti
1972	648,591 (8th)	1.9	0 / 630	▼23	Tullio Vecchietti

Senate of the Republic
Election year	Votes	%	Seats	+/−	Leader
1968	into PCI	–	13 / 315	–	Tullio Vecchietti
1972	into PCI	–	11 / 315	▼2	Tullio Vecchietti

== Secretaries ==
- Tullio Vecchietti (January 1964 – September 1971)
- Dario Valori (October 1971 – July 1972)

== See also ==
- Giuseppe Impastato, anti-mafia journalist member of the party, assassinated on 9 May 1978
