= 1958 Italian general election =

- 25 May 1958

All 596 seats in the Chamber of Deputies 299 seats needed for a majority All 246 elective seats in the Senate 127 seats needed for a majority (Note: taking into account the Senators for life, which accounted for 6 seats at the time the election took place)
- Registered: 32,434,852 (C) · 29,183,501 (S)
- Turnout: 30,434,681 (C) · 93.8% (0.0 pp); 27,425,843 (S) · 93.9% (▼0.1 pp)
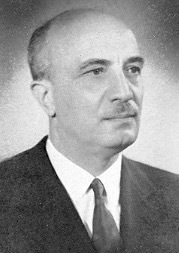

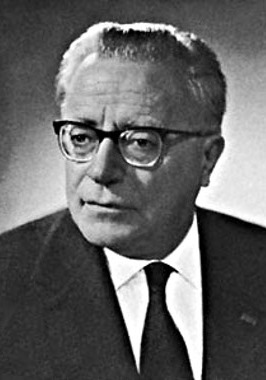

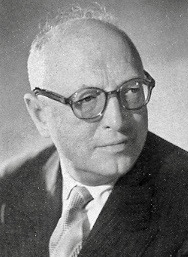

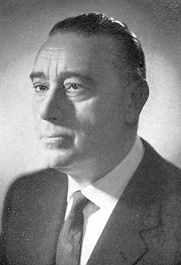

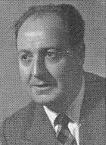

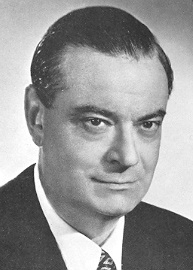
	Majority party	Minority party	Third party
Leader	Amintore Fanfani	Palmiro Togliatti	Pietro Nenni
Party	DC	PCI	PSI
Leader since	16 July 1954	15 May 1943 (Note: Togliatti also served as secretary of the Communist Party of Italy from 1926 to 1934 and from 1938 to 1943.)	16 May 1949 (Note: Nenni also served as secretary from 1933 to 1939 and from 1943 to 1945.)
Leader's seat	Arezzo (C)	Rome (C)	Milan (C)
Seats won	273 (C) / 123 (S)	140 (C) / 59 (S)	84 (C) / 35 (S)
Seat change	▲17 (C) / ▲7 (S)	▼3 (C) / ▲7 (S)	▲9 (C) / ▲9 (S)
Popular vote	12,520,207 (C); 10,780,954 (S)	6,704,454 (C); 5,700,952 (S)	4,206,726 (C); 3,682,945 (S)
Percentage	42.4% (C); 41.2% (S)	22.7% (C); 21.8% (S)	14.2% (C); 14.1% (S)
Swing	▲2.3 pp (C) ▲1.4 pp (S)	▲0.1 pp (C) ▲1.6 pp (S)	▲1.5 pp (C) ▲2.2 pp (S)
	Fourth party	Fifth party	Sixth party
Leader	Arturo Michelini	Giuseppe Saragat	Giovanni Malagodi
Party	MSI	PSDI	PLI
Leader since	10 October 1954	11 April 1957 (Note: Saragat also served as secretary from 1949 to 1952 and from 1952 to 1954.)	4 April 1954
Leader's seat	Rome (C)	Turin (C)	Milan (C)
Seats won	24 (C) / 8 (S)	22 (C) / 5 (S)	17 (C) / 4 (S)
Seat change	▼5 (C) / ▼1 (S)	▲3 (C) / ▲1 (S)	▲4 (C) / ▲1 (S)
Popular vote	1,407,718 (C); 1,150,051 (S)	1,345,447 (C); 1,164,280 (S)	1,047,081 (C); 1,012,610 (S)
Percentage	4.8% (C); 4.4% (S)	4.6% (C); 4.5% (S)	3.5% (C); 3.9% (S)
Swing	▼1.0 pp (C) ▼1.7 pp (S)	▲0.1 pp (C) ▲0.2 pp (S)	▲0.5 pp (C) ▲1.0 pp (S)
Prime Minister before election
Adone Zoli
DC
Prime Minister after the election
Amintore Fanfani
DC

The 1958 Italian general election was held in Italy on 25 May 1958. The number of MPs to be elected was calculated upon the population's size for the last time.

== Electoral system ==
Minor changes were made to the electoral law in 1958, creating a system which would remain unchanged until its abrogation in 1993.

The pure party-list proportional representation was definitely adopted for the Chamber of Deputies. Italian provinces were united in 32 constituencies, each electing a group of candidates. At constituency level, seats were divided between open lists using the largest remainder method with Imperiali quota. Remaining votes and seats were transferred at national level, where they were divided using the Hare quota, and automatically distributed to best losers into the local lists.

For the Senate, 237 single-seat constituencies were established, even if the assembly had 9 more members. The candidates needed a landslide victory of two thirds of votes to be elected: only 5 hoping senators reached this goal. All remained votes and seats were grouped in party lists and regional constituencies, where a D'Hondt method was used: inside the lists, candidates with the best percentages were elected.

== Historical background ==
After De Gasperi's retirement in 1953, Fanfani emerged as the anticipated successor, a role confirmed by his appointment as party secretary from 1954 to 1959. He reorganized and rejuvenated the national party organization of the Christian Democrats after the dependence on the church and the government which had typified the De Gasperi period.

Fanfani's activist and sometimes authoritarian style, as well as his reputation as an economic reformer, ensured that the moderates within the DC, who opposed the state's intrusion into the country's economic life, regarded him with distrust. His indefatigable energy and his passion for efficiency carried him far in politics, but he was rarely able to exploit fully the opportunities that he created. One politician once remarked: "Fanfani has colleagues, associates, acquaintances and subordinates. But I have never heard much about his friends."

== Parties and leaders ==
Party	Ideology	Leader	Seats in 1953		
Party	Ideology	Leader	C	S	Total
Christian Democracy (DC)	Christian democracy	Amintore Fanfani	263	112	375
Italian Communist Party (PCI)	Communism	Palmiro Togliatti	143	52	195
Italian Socialist Party (PSI)	Socialism	Pietro Nenni	75	26	101
Monarchist National Party (PNM)	Monarchism	Alfredo Covelli	40	14	54
Italian Social Movement (MSI)	Neo-fascism	Arturo Michelini	29	9	38
Italian Democratic Socialist Party (PSDI)	Social democracy	Giuseppe Saragat	19	4	23
Italian Liberal Party (PLI)	Conservative liberalism	Giovanni Malagodi	13	3	16
Italian Republican Party (PRI)	Liberalism	Oronzo Reale	5	0	5
People's Monarchist Party (PMP)	Monarchism	Achille Lauro	New		

== Results ==
The election gave similar results of five years before and, consequently, the same problems of political instability of the centrist formula. Christian Democracy was polarized by a fraction which liked more leftist politics, and another one which urged for a rightist route. Party's secretary Amintore Fanfani was in the first field, and called for a dialogue with the Italian Socialist Party, which had frozen its relationships with the Italian Communist Party after the Hungarian Revolution. Fanfani led a year-term government, but the reaction of the conservative fraction gave the power to Antonio Segni, followed by Fernando Tambroni who received a decisive vote of confidence by the neo-fascist Italian Social Movement. The MSI had been banned by any type of political power since its birth under the theory of the Constitutional Arch, which stated that any government or opposition party which had voted the Italian Constitution, had to refuse any relationship with fascist and monarchist forces, seen as anti-constitutional groups. Strikes and revolts causing some casualties erupted through the country, and Tambroni had to resign. Fanfani returned to the premiership, this time with an openly centre-left programme supported by the socialist abstention. The government created the middle school for workers' sons, and the ENEL after the electric energy nationalisation.

=== Chamber of Deputies ===
Party	Votes	%	Seats	+/–
Christian Democracy	12,520,207	42.35	273	+10
Italian Communist Party	6,704,454	22.68	140	−3
Italian Socialist Party	4,206,726	14.23	84	+9
Italian Social Movement	1,407,718	4.76	24	−5
Italian Democratic Socialist Party	1,345,447	4.55	22	+3
Italian Liberal Party	1,047,081	3.54	17	+4
People's Monarchist Party	776,919	2.63	14	New
Monarchist National Party	659,997	2.23	11	−29
Italian Republican Party–Radical Party	405,782	1.37	6	+1
Community Movement	173,227	0.59	1	New
South Tyrolean People's Party	135,491	0.46	3	0
Movement for Piedmontese Regional Autonomy	70,589	0.24	0	New
Valdostan Union	30,596	0.10	1	New
Catholic National Resurrection Party	15,929	0.05	0	New
Autonomous Federation of Italian Social Democrats	9,332	0.03	0	New
National Labour Party	7,183	0.02	0	New
Autonomy Piemont-Villarboito Movement	6,955	0.02	0	New
Union of Trieste	6,661	0.02	0	New
Independence Front	6,305	0.02	0	New
Pro-Pensioners Movement	4,987	0.02	0	New
Italian Soldiers' United Front	4,172	0.01	0	New
European Democratic Concentration	4,133	0.01	0	New
Independent Divorce Movement	3,955	0.01	0	New
Sicilian Social Party	3,136	0.01	0	New
Italian National Movement	1,499	0.01	0	0
Action-Renewal Movement	752	0.00	0	New
Italian Social Economic Movement	571	0.00	0	New
Italian Party of Borrowers and War Invalids	465	0.00	0	New
Total	29,560,269	100.00	596	+6
Valid votes	29,560,269	97.13		
Invalid/blank votes	874,412	2.87		
Total votes	30,434,681	100.00		
Registered voters/turnout	32,434,852	93.83		
Source: Ministry of the Interior

Popular vote
DC	42.35%
PCI	22.68%
PSI	14.23%
MSI	4.76%
PSDI	4.55%
PLI	3.54%
PMP	2.63%
PNM	2.23%
PRI–PR	1.37%
Others	1.64%

Seats
DC	45.81%
PCI	23.49%
PSI	14.09%
MSI	4.03%
PSDI	3.69%
PLI	2.85%
PMP	2.35%
PNM	1.85%
PRI–PR	1.01%
Others	0.84%

==== Results by constituency ====
Constituency	Total seats	Seats won									
Constituency	Total seats	DC	PCI	PSI	MSI	PSDI	PLI	PMP	PNM	PRI–PR	Others
Turin	26	11	6	4		2	1		1		1
Cuneo	14	8	2	2		1	1				
Genoa	21	9	5	4	1	1	1				
Milan	39	15	9	7	1	3	2	1	1		
Como	14	8	2	3		1					
Brescia	19	12	2	3		1	1				
Mantua	10	5	3	2							
Trentino	10	5		1		1					3
Verona	29	18	4	4	1	1	1				
Venice	16	9	3	3		1					
Udine	14	8	2	2	1	1					
Bologna	27	7	10	4	1	2	1			2	
Parma	19	7	7	3		1	1				
Florence	13	5	6	2							
Pisa	15	6	5	3						1	
Siena	9	3	4	2							
Ancona	19	8	5	3	1	1				1	
Perugia	13	5	4	3	1						
Rome	39	16	9	5	4	1	1	1	1	1	
L'Aquila	17	8	4	2	1			1	1		
Campobasso	6	4	1				1				
Naples	34	14	8	3	1	1	1	6			
Benevento	21	10	4	2	1	1	1	1	1		
Bari	22	10	7	3	1				1		
Lecce	18	9	4	2	2				1		
Potenza	8	4	2	1				1			
Catanzaro	26	13	6	3	1		1	1	1		
Catania	29	13	6	3	2	1	2	1	1		
Palermo	29	13	6	3	2	1	1	1	1	1	
Cagliari	15	8	3	2	1				1		
Aosta Valley	1										1
Trieste	4	2	1		1						
Total	596	273	140	84	24	22	17	14	11	6	4

=== Senate of the Republic ===
Party	Votes	%	Seats	+/–
Christian Democracy	10,780,954	41.23	123	+10
Italian Communist Party	5,700,952	21.80	59	+8
Italian Socialist Party	3,682,945	14.08	35	+9
Italian Democratic Socialist Party	1,164,280	4.45	5	+1
Italian Social Movement	1,150,051	4.40	8	−1
Italian Liberal Party	1,012,610	3.87	4	+1
People's Monarchist Party	774,242	2.96	5	New
Monarchist National Party	565,045	2.16	2	−14
Italian Republican Party – Radical Party	363,462	1.39	0	0
MSI – PNM	291,359	1.11	0	0
PCI – PSI	185,557	0.71	2	0
Community Movement	142,897	0.55	0	New
South Tyrolean People's Party	120,068	0.46	2	0
Movement for Piedmontese Regional Autonomy	61,088	0.23	0	New
PSI – PSDI	43,191	0.17	0	0
Left-wing independents	28,141	0.11	1	+1
Sardinian Action Party	25,923	0.10	0	0
Key	12,686	0.05	0	New
Bruno Buitoni	11,540	0.04	0	New
Three Peaks of Lavaredo	9,928	0.04	0	New
Tota Sabina Civitas	6,449	0.02	0	New
National Monarchist Party	4,729	0.02	0	New
National Labour Party	3,588	0.01	0	New
Socialist Unification	3,110	0.01	0	New
Four-Leaf Clover	2,818	0.01	0	New
Rural Movement	2,389	0.01	0	New
Total	26,150,002	100.00	246	+9
Valid votes	26,150,002	95.35		
Invalid/blank votes	1,275,841	4.65		
Total votes	27,425,843	100.00		
Registered voters/turnout	29,183,501	93.98		
Source: Ministry of the Interior

Popular vote
DC	41.23%
PCI	21.80%
PSI	14.08%
PSDI	4.45%
MSI	4.40%
PLI	3.87%
PMP	2.96%
PNM	2.16%
PRI–PR	1.39%
Others	3.66%

Seats
DC	50.00%
PCI	23.98%
PSI	14.23%
MSI	3.25%
PSDI	2.03%
PMP	2.03%
PLI	1.63%
PNM	0.81%
Others	2.03%

==== Results by constituency ====
Constituency	Total seats	Seats won								
Constituency	Total seats	DC	PCI	PSI	MSI	PSDI	PMP	PLI	PNM	Others
Piedmont	18	9	4	3		1		1		
Aosta Valley	1									1
Lombardy	33	16	6	7	1	2		1		
Trentino-Alto Adige	6	4								2
Veneto	20	13	3	3		1				
Friuli-Venezia Giulia	6	4	1	1						
Liguria	8	4	2	2						
Emilia-Romagna	18	6	8	3		1				
Tuscany	16	7	6	3						
Umbria	6	2	2	2						
Marche	7	4	2	1						
Lazio	17	8	4	2	2		1			
Abruzzo and Molise	8	5	2	1						
Campania	22	10	5	2	1		3	1		
Apulia	16	8	4	2	1				1	
Basilicata	6	4	2							
Calabria	10	5	3	1	1					
Sicily	22	10	5	2	2		1	1	1	
Sardinia	6	4								2
Total	246	123	59	35	8	5	5	4	2	5
