= 1968 Italian general election =

- 19 May 1968

All 630 seats in the Chamber of Deputies 316 seats needed for a majority All 315 elective seats in the Senate 162 seats needed for a majority (Note: taking into account the Senators for life, which accounted for 7 seats at the time the election took place)
- Registered: 35,566,493 (C) · 32,517,638 (S)
- Turnout: 33,001,644 (C) · 92.8% (▼0.1 pp); 30,252,921 (S) · 93.0% (▼0.1 pp)
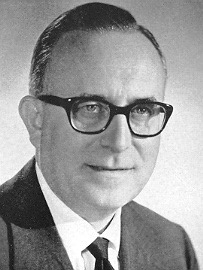

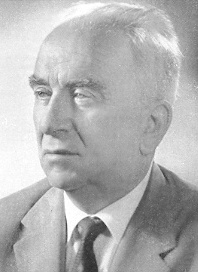

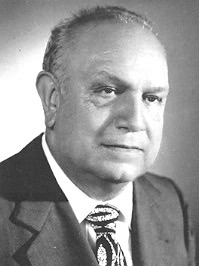

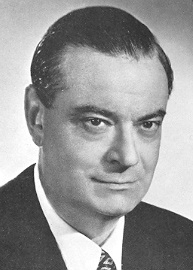

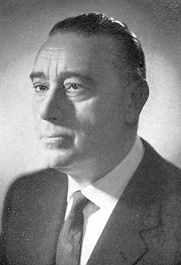

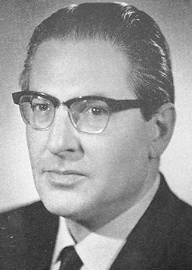
	Majority party	Minority party	Third party
Leader	Mariano Rumor	Luigi Longo	Francesco De Martino (Note: As secretary of the main party within the coalition, the Italian Socialist Party (PSI).)
Party	DC	PCI	PSU
Leader since	27 January 1964	22 August 1964	12 December 1963
Leader's seat	Verona (C)	Milan (C)	Naples (C)
Seats won	266 (C) / 135 (S)	177 (C) / 101 (S) (Note: In a joint list with the PSIUP.)	91 (C) / 46 (S)
Seat change	▲6 (C) / ▲6 (S)	▲11 (C) / ▲17 (S)	▼29 (C) / ▼12 (S)
Popular vote	12,441,553 (C); 10,972,114 (S)	8,557,404 (C); 8,585,601 (S)	4,605,832 (C); 4,354,906 (S)
Percentage	39.1% (C); 38.3% (S)	26.9% (C); 30.0% (S)	14.5% (C); 15.2% (S)
Swing	▲0.8 pp (C) ▲1.8 pp (S)	▲1.6 pp (C) ▲6.5 pp (S)	▼5.5 pp (C) (Note: Considering the votes of the PSI and of the PSDI.) ▼5.1 pp (S)
	Fourth party	Fifth party	Sixth party
Leader	Giovanni Malagodi	Arturo Michelini	Tullio Vecchietti
Party	PLI	MSI	PSIUP
Leader since	4 April 1954	10 October 1954	12 January 1964
Leader's seat	Milan (C)	Rome (C)	Rome (C)
Seats won	31 (C) / 16 (S)	24 (C) / 11 (S)	23 (C) / w. PCI (S)
Seat change	▼8 (C) / ▼2 (S)	▼3 (C) / ▼3 (S)	New party
Popular vote	1,850,650 (C); 1,943,795 (S)	1,414,036 (C); 1,304,847 (S)	1,414,697 (C) w. PCI (S)
Percentage	5.1% (C); 6.8% (S)	4.5% (C); 4.6% (S)	4.5% (C) w. PCI (S)
Swing	▼1.2 pp (C) ▼0.6 pp (S)	▼0.6 pp (C) ▼0.7 pp (S)	New party
- Results of the election in the Chamber and Senate
Prime Minister before election
Aldo Moro
DC
Prime Minister after the election
Giovanni Leone
DC

The 1968 Italian general election was held in Italy on 19 May 1968. The Christian Democracy (DC) remained stable around 38% of the votes. They were marked by a victory of the Communist Party (PCI) passing from 25% of 1963 to c. 30% at the Senate, where it presented jointly with the new Italian Socialist Party of Proletarian Unity (PSIUP), which included members of the Socialist Party (PSI) which disagreed the latter's alliance with DC. PSIUP gained c. 4.5% at the Chamber. The Socialist Party and the Democratic Socialist Party (PSDI) presented together as the Unified PSI–PSDI, but gained c. 15%, far less than the sum of what the two parties had obtained separately in 1963.

== Electoral system ==
The pure party-list proportional representation had traditionally become the electoral system for the Chamber of Deputies. Italian provinces were united in 32 constituencies, each electing a group of candidates. At constituency level, seats were divided between open lists using the largest remainder method with Imperiali quota. Remaining votes and seats were transferred at national level, where they was divided using the Hare quota, and automatically distributed to best losers into the local lists.

For the Senate, 237 single-seat constituencies were established, even if the assembly had risen to 315 members. The candidates needed a landslide victory of two thirds of votes to be elected, a goal which could be reached only by the German minorities in South Tirol. All remained votes and seats were grouped in party lists and regional constituencies, where a D'Hondt method was used: inside the lists, candidates with the best percentages were elected.

== Historical background ==
On 21 August 1964, the historic leader of the Italian Communist Party, Palmiro Togliatti died of cerebral haemorrhage while vacationing with his companion Nilde Iotti in Yalta, then in the Soviet Union. According to some of his collaborators, Togliatti was travelling to the Soviet Union in order to give his support to Leonid Brezhnev's election as Nikita Khrushchev's successor at the head of Communist Party of the Soviet Union. Togliatti was replaced by Luigi Longo, a long-time prominent PCI member; Longo continued Togliatti's line, known as the "Italian road to Socialism", playing down the alliance between the Italian Communist Party and the USSR. He reacted without hostility to the new left movements that sprang up in 1968 and, among the leaders of the PCI, was one of those most disposed to engage with the new activists, although he did not condone their excesses.

Moreover, Francesco De Martino, became the new Secretary of the Italian Socialist Party, after the resignation of Pietro Nenni, due to age.

In 1965, the SIFAR intelligence agency was transformed into the SID following an aborted coup d'état, Piano Solo, which was to give power to the Carabinieri, at that time headed by general De Lorenzo.

The difficult equilibrium of Italian society was challenged by a rising left-wing movement, in the wake of 1968 student unrest ("Sessantotto"). This movement was characterized by such heterogeneous events as revolts by jobless farm workers (Avola, Battipaglia 1969), occupations of Universities by students, social unrest in the large Northern factories (1969 autunno caldo, hot autumn). While conservative forces tried to roll back some of the social changes of the 1960s, and part of the military indulged in "sabre rattling" in order to intimidate progressive political forces, numerous left-wing activists became increasingly frustrated at social inequalities, while the myth of guerrilla (Che Guevara, the Uruguayan Tupamaros) and of the Chinese Maoist "cultural revolution" increasingly inspired extreme left-wing violent movements.

Social protests, in which the student movement was particularly active, shook Italy during the 1969 autunno caldo (Hot Autumn), leading to the occupation of the Fiat factory in Turin. In March 1968, clashes occurred at La Sapienza university in Rome, during the "Battle of Valle Giulia." Mario Capanna, associated with the New Left, was one of the figures of the student movement, along with the members of Potere Operaio and Autonomia Operaia such as (Antonio Negri, Oreste Scalzone, Franco Piperno and of Lotta Continua such as Adriano Sofri.

== Parties and leaders ==
Party	Ideology	Leader	Seats in 1963		
Party	Ideology	Leader	C	S	Total
Christian Democracy (DC)	Christian democracy	Mariano Rumor	260	132	392
Italian Communist Party (PCI)	Communism	Luigi Longo	166	84	250
Unified Socialist Party (PSU)	Democratic socialism	Francesco De Martino	120	58	178
Italian Liberal Party (PLI)	Conservative liberalism	Giovanni Malagodi	39	18	57
Italian Social Movement (MSI)	Neo-fascism	Arturo Michelini	27	15	42
Democratic Party of Monarchist Unity (PDIUM)	Monarchism	Alfredo Covelli	8	2	10
Italian Republican Party (PRI)	Liberalism	Ugo La Malfa	6	1	7
Italian Socialist Party of Proletarian Unity (PSIUP)	Socialism	Tullio Vecchietti	New		

== Results ==
The election was a test for the new organization of the socialist area, which was divided between the new revolutionary and Communist-allied Italian Socialist Party of Proletarian Unity and the governmental social-democratic federation between PSI and PSDI. The polls said that the split of the PSIUP in 1964 had not been a purely parliamentary operation, but the reflex of divisions into the leftist electorate. The result shocked the PSI's leadership, causing the sudden sinking of the social-democratic federation, and an alternance of provisional retirements by the government, firstly led by lifetime senator Giovanni Leone and then, through two political crisis, by DC's secretary Mariano Rumor. Unsuccessfully trying to recover its lost leftist electors, the PSI returned to the alliance with the PCI for the regional elections of 1970, so causing another crisis and a new change of premiership, then led by Emilio Colombo, but the government coalition had continuous problems of instability. Influent Giulio Andreotti tried to resurrect the centrist formula in 1972, but he failed, opening the way to the first early election of the republican history.

=== Chamber of Deputies ===
Party	Votes	%	Seats	+/–
Christian Democracy	12,437,848	39.12	266	+6
Italian Communist Party	8,551,347	26.90	177	+11
Unified Socialist Party	4,603,192	14.48	91	−29
Italian Liberal Party	1,850,650	5.82	31	−8
Italian Socialist Party of Proletarian Unity	1,414,697	4.45	23	New
Italian Social Movement	1,414,036	4.45	24	−3
Italian Republican Party	626,533	1.97	9	+3
Italian Democratic Party of Monarchist Unity	414,507	1.30	6	−2
South Tyrolean People's Party	152,991	0.48	3	0
Social Democracy	100,212	0.32	0	New
New Republic	63,402	0.20	0	New
Autonomous Party of Italy's Pensioners	41,716	0.13	0	0
Valdostan Union	31,557	0.10	0	−1
Sardinian Action Party	27,228	0.09	0	New
National Monarchist Party	18,883	0.06	0	0
Socialist Movement	6,551	0.02	0	New
Slovene Union	6,142	0.02	0	0
Socialist Workers' Party	5,740	0.02	0	New
National Union of Public Health	3,697	0.01	0	0
Technique	3,158	0.01	0	New
Party of Economic Order	3,013	0.01	0	New
Democratic Progressive Party	2,208	0.01	0	New
Farmers' Party	2,061	0.01	0	New
Italian Group	1,807	0.01	0	New
Revolutionary Communist Party	1,798	0.01	0	New
Radical Party	1,540	0.00	0	New
Popular Collection	1,196	0.00	0	New
Sacred Idealism World	1,126	0.00	0	New
Progressive Party U.N.S.I.P.O.	1,068	0.00	0	New
National Party of Italian Mutilated and Combatants	524	0.00	0	New
Total	31,790,428	100.00	630	0
Valid votes	31,790,428	96.33		
Invalid/blank votes	1,211,216	3.67		
Total votes	33,001,644	100.00		
Registered voters/turnout	35,566,493	92.79		
Source: Ministry of the Interior

Popular vote
DC	39.12%
PCI	26.90%
PSU	14.48%
PLI	5.82%
PSIUP	4.45%
MSI	4.45%
PRI	1.97%
PDIUM	1.30%
Others	1.50%

Seats
DC	42.22%
PCI	28.10%
PSU	14.44%
PLI	4.92%
MSI	3.81%
PSIUP	3.65%
PRI	1.43%
PDIUM	0.95%
Others	0.48%

==== Results by constituency ====
Constituency	Total seats	Seats won								
Constituency	Total seats	DC	PCI	PSU	PLI	MSI	PSIUP	PRI	PDIUM	Others
Turin	32	11	10	5	3	1	2			
Cuneo	15	7	3	3	1		1			
Genoa	22	8	7	4	2		1			
Milan	47	17	13	8	4	2	2	1		
Como	17	9	3	3	1		1			
Brescia	20	12	3	3	1		1			
Mantua	9	4	3	2						
Trentino	9	4	1	1						3
Verona	28	17	4	4	1	1	1			
Venice	18	9	4	3	1		1			
Udine	15	7	3	3	1		1			
Bologna	25	6	12	4	1		1	1		
Parma	20	6	9	3	1		1			
Florence	16	5	8	2	1					
Pisa	15	5	6	2		1	1			
Siena	9	3	5	1						
Ancona	17	7	6	2			1	1		
Perugia	13	4	5	2		1	1			
Rome	47	17	13	6	4	4	1	1	1	
L'Aquila	15	8	4	2		1				
Campobasso	5	3	1	1						
Naples	38	15	10	5	1	3	1	1	2	
Benevento	21	10	4	3	1	1	1		1	
Bari	23	11	7	3	1	1				
Lecce	19	9	5	2	1	2				
Potenza	8	5	2	1						
Catanzaro	26	11	6	5	1	1	1	1		
Catania	29	13	7	3	2	2	1	1		
Palermo	29	12	7	3	1	2	1	2	1	
Cagliari	19	8	5	2	1	1	1		1	
Aosta Valley	1	1								
Trieste	3	2	1							
Total	630	266	177	91	31	24	23	9	6	3

=== Senate of the Republic ===
Party	Votes	%	Seats	+/–
Christian Democracy	10,972,114	38.34	135	+6
Italian Communist Party–PSIUP	8,585,601	30.00	101	+17
Unified Socialist Party	4,354,906	15.22	46	−12
Italian Liberal Party	1,943,795	6.79	16	−2
Italian Social Movement	1,304,847	4.56	11	−3
Italian Republican Party	622,388	2.17	2	+2
Italian Democratic Party of Monarchist Unity	312,702	1.09	2	0
MSI–PDIUM	292,349	1.02	0	−1
South Tyrolean People's Party	131,071	0.46	2	0
Social Democracy	36,073	0.13	0	New
Valdostan Union	28,414	0.10	0	0
Sardinian Action Party	25,891	0.09	0	0
Socialist Workers' Party	5,870	0.02	0	New
Total	28,616,021	100.00	315	0
Valid votes	28,616,021	94.59		
Invalid/blank votes	1,636,900	5.41		
Total votes	30,252,921	100.00		
Registered voters/turnout	32,517,638	93.04		
Source: Ministry of the Interior

Popular vote
DC	38.34%
PCI–PSIUP	30.00%
PSU	15.22%
PLI	6.79%
MSI	4.56%
PRI	2.17%
PDIUM	1.09%
Others	1.83%

Seats
DC	42.86%
PCI–PSIUP	32.06%
PSU	14.60%
PLI	5.08%
MSI	3.49%
PRI	0.63%
PDIUM	0.63%
Others	0.63%

==== Results by constituency ====
Constituency	Total seats	Seats won							
Constituency	Total seats	DC	PCI–PSIUP	PSU	PLI	MSI	PRI	PDIUM	Others
Piedmont	24	10	7	4	3				
Aosta Valley	1	1							
Lombardy	45	20	12	8	4	1			
Trentino-Alto Adige	7	4		1					2
Veneto	23	13	5	4	1				
Friuli-Venezia Giulia	7	4	2	1					
Liguria	11	4	4	2	1				
Emilia-Romagna	22	6	12	3	1				
Tuscany	20	7	10	3					
Umbria	7	2	4	1					
Marche	8	4	3	1					
Lazio	24	9	8	3	2	2			
Abruzzo	7	4	2	1					
Molise	2	2							
Campania	29	11	8	4	1	2	1	2	
Apulia	21	9	6	3	1	2			
Basilicata	7	4	2	1					
Calabria	12	5	4	2		1			
Sicily	29	11	9	3	2	3	1		
Sardinia	9	5	3	1					
Total	315	135	101	46	16	11	2	2	2

== Maps ==

Seat distribution by constituency for the Chamber of Deputies (left) and Senate (right)
