= Brigate Garibaldi =

Partisan units aligned with the Italian Communist Party during WWII

- Flag of the Garibaldi Brigades
- Active: September 1943 - May 1945
- Country: Kingdom of Italy
- Type: Army
- Role: Partisan brigade
- Engagements: World War II

Insignia
- Breast badge

The Brigate Garibaldi or Garibaldi Brigades were partisan units aligned with the Italian Communist Party active in the armed resistance against both German and Italian fascist forces during World War II.

The Brigades were mostly made up of communists, but also included members of other parties of the National Liberation Committee (CLN), in particular the Italian Socialist Party. Led by Luigi Longo and Pietro Secchia, they were the largest of the partisan groups and suffered the highest number of losses. Members wore a red handkerchief around the neck with red stars on their hats.

== History ==
=== Operative design ===
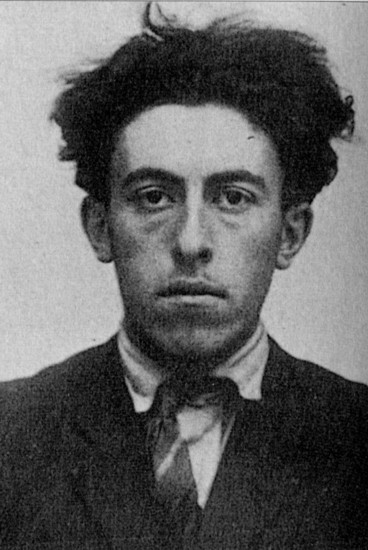
Pietro Secchia "Vineis", political commissar of the Garibaldi Brigades

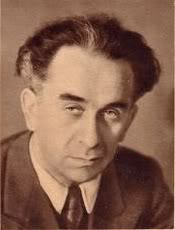
Luigi Longo "Italo", the general commander of the Garibaldi Brigades

On 20 September 1943 in Milano, the military committee of PCI was formed and in October it became in the general command of the Brigate d'assalto Garibaldi (Garibaldi Assault Brigades) under the leadership of Longo and Secchia. This early management structure, initially equipped with poor means, began immediately its activity in order to overcome every "wait and see" attitudes and constantly potentiate of the military activities against the occupying power (the Nazi Germany) and the fascist structures of the Italian Social Republic.

The general command of the brigades ordered the formation of a relay system from the communist cells already active in the cities, in order to link militant units among the various zones, the strengthen of connections and the actual carrying out of the partisan struggle. For this purpose, it was established that the 50% of militants had to be assigned to the military activity. A body of inspectors was assigned to the various regions with the task to control the partisan activity of brigades and to develop their political-military activity. Members of the general command were later decentralised, the main leadership was located in Milan and detached delegations were formed in each region under the guide by a command member with wide decisional powers.

After the war declaration to Germany by Badoglio I Cabinet on 13 October 1943, the general command of BG issued a document (Direttive d'attacco, "Attack Directives") in line with the political directives of PCI in favour of the organization and intensification of the partisan war, characterized by a claim for legality and a call to a resolute fight against Germans and militants of the fascist RSI. In November 1943, Pietro Secchia wrote an article on PCI journal La nostra lotta defining the political-military project adopted by BGs: he claimed the importance of the immediate military action in order to "shorten the war" and reduce the period of the German occupation, saving people and villages; in order to demonstrate to Allies the will of the Italian people to fight for their own freedom and democracy; to contrast the Nazi-fascist policy of terror, to make the occupation unstable and to stimulate, through the actual action, the development of the partisan organization and struggle.

=== Organization ===
The organization was structured by PCI direction. The use of the name "brigade" indicated the overcoming of the "band" and the traditional military-like organization. It was also a reference to the International Brigades of the Spanish Civil War. The partisan organization was named after general Giuseppe Garibaldi, one of the main contributors to the Italian unification.

Size of brigades was different for each operative context. The structure set by PCI provided, beside a military commander, a political commissar with equal military powers but involved also in propaganda and formation of partisans; this structure was replicated also within squads, battalions and other subgroups. The word assalto ("assault") was a political choice which aimed to remove uncertainties regarding the possibility of fight and to overcome doubts in the struggle against fascists. Therefore, it was also a reference to the "assault units" of World War I.

The establishment of brigades was based on the harshness conspiracy, discipline and motivation of communist cadres but mostly on the openness and availability in recruiting volunteers, including youth, former soldiers or members of organization dismantled by the regime. In autumn 1943, the general command defined the command structure of brigades with the political commissar and the officers for the military command and chief of staff.

While the 50% of PCI militants was directly involved in the military activity with the brigades, the other half was dedicated to conspiracy in the cities, organizing and developing the struggle of workers among factories, to the agitation of peasants in some zones and the infiltration among schools and universities, supporting also the recruitment and the flow of volunteers to combatant formations on mountains. During the Resistance, the separation between the two sides had never been irreversible and militants switched from an activity to another one, also if in some provinces a separation occurred between the "political work" of local leaders and the "military work" given to commanders of BGs on the field and to regional delegates with full powers.

== Garibaldi Brigades during the partisan war ==
=== Brigades ===
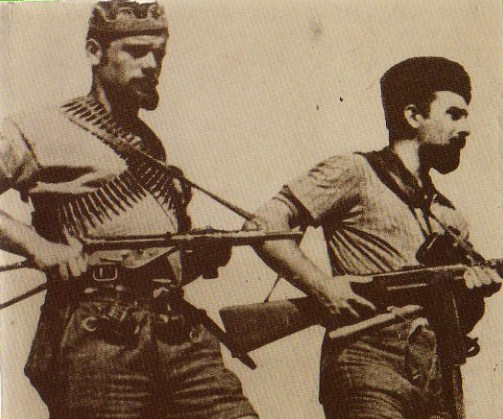
Two Garibaldian partisans armed with Sten and MAB38 submachine guns

Despite the direct link with PCI, the Garibaldi Brigades had notable leaders who were not communist militants, like the Catholic and apolitical Aldo Gastaldi (with the battle name "Bisagno", after the homonymous torrent stream), one of the most important partisan commanders in Genoa, the apolitical Mario Musolesi (battle name "Lupo"), leader of the Brigata Partigiana Stella Rossa killed by Germans during the roundup of Marzabotto, the anarchic Emilio Canzi, the sole commander of the 13th operative zone of Tuscan Emilian Apennines. Moreover, Aldo Aniasi remained at the command of the 2ª Divisione Garibaldi "Redi" in Ossola despite he had left the PCI in order to join the PSI, while Luigi Pierobon, one of the leaders of the Italian Catholic Federation of University Students of Veneto, had an important part in the creation of the Divisione Garibaldi "Ateo Garemi". Some monarchical officers also joined the BGs and obtained the command of detachments, battalions or even entire brigades, for their military preparation, like captain Ugo Ricci (among the first promoters of the resistance in the province of Como, killed in action during the battle of Lenno) and lieutenant count Luchino Dal Verme, who commanded as "Maino" the 88ª Brigata "Casotti" and later the entire "Antonio Gramsci" division in the Oltrepò Pavese.

Those situations led sometimes to diatribes and contrasts that did not reduced the common will of antifascist struggle and the related application in fight.

The most famous groups of Garibaldi Brigades were those of Vincenzo Moscatelli "Cino" and Eraldo Gastone "Ciro" in the Partisan Republic of Valsesia, Pompeo Colajanni "Barbato", Vincenzo Modica "Petralia" and Giovanni Latilla "Nanni" in Valle Po and Langhe, Francesco Moranino "Gemisto" in Biella, Mario Ricci "Armando" in Modena and Arrigo Boldrini "Bulow" in Romagna.

Together with BGs, there were the Gruppi di azione patriottica (GAP, "Groups of Patriotic Action"), specialised in sabotages and attempts against Nazi-fascist occupants. GAPs and BGs represented almost 50% of the forces of the partisan Resistance. At the final insurrection of April 1945, the active garibaldini combatants were about 51,000 divided in 23 "divisions" on a total of about 100,000 partisans. On 15 April 1945, the general command of Garibaldi Brigades was formed by nine divisions in Piedmont (15,000 members), three in Lombardy (4,000 members), four in Veneto (10,000), three in Emilia (12,000) and four divisions (10,000) in Liguria.

As a military force, the BGs were the most numerous group which was organized with 575 formations; they took part to most of fights and suffered the most number of losses, with over 42,000 killed in action or after a roundup. The Garibaldini distinguished by their political symbols of their uniforms: red handkerchiefs around the neck, red stars on hats, emblems with hammer and sickle. Despite the directives of CVL command aimed to unite all the combatant formations and to promote the use of national badges and the military salute, militants of the brigades continued to be indifferent towards those directives, remaining faithful to their traditions, and most of them continued to salute with the raised fist.

=== General command ===
Generally, Garibaldi Brigades received orders from the PCI representative among the Corpo Volontari della Libertà, who was Luigi Longo (battle name "Italo"), and from the National Liberation Committee. However, all the BGs depended directly on the general command, formed by general commander Longo, Pietro Secchia (battle name "Botte" or "Vineis"), who was also the political commissar of the brigades, Giancarlo Pajetta ("Luca", deputy commander); Giorgio Amendola ("Palmieri"), Antonio Carini ("Orsi", killed in March 1944), Francesco Leone, Umberto Massola, Antonio Roasio, Francesco Scotti and Eugenio Curiel (killed on 24 February 1945). Those leaders developed the Garibaldi resistance movements and spread the communist influence in northern Italy.

Along with Longo, Secchia and the other members of the general command, other important figures were active in the regional coordination like Antonio Roasio ("Paolo"), who controlled the brigades in Veneto and Emilia, Francesco Scotti ("Fausto" or "Grossi"), who led the formations in Piedmont and Liguria, and Pietro Vergani ("Fabio"), responsible in Lombardy. The Italian Communist Party had a decisive role in the strengthening and the organization; since the beginning, structures of the party had decided that at least the 10% of the cadres and the 15% of the subscribers had to be sent to the mountains in order to create the fundamental nucleus of aggregation and cohesion around which the units had to be developed.

Moreover, Brigate Garibaldi had their representatives in the regional commands of CVL, who were Giordano Pratolongo and then Francesco Scotti (Piedmont); Pietro Vergani (Lombardy), Liguria Luigi Pieragostini and Carlo Farini (Liguria) after his arrest on 27 December 1944, Ilio Barontini (Emilia-Romagna), Pratolongo and then Aldo Lampredi (Veneto), Luigi Gaiami and then Francesco Leone and Antonio Roasio (Tuscany), Alessandro Vaia (Marche) and Celso Ghini (Umbria). In Trieste there were Luigi Frausin and Vincenzo Gigante who, in connection with the general command, had relations with the Yugoslav partisans supporting the need to postpone the territorial revendications until the end of the war, in order to fight together against the common enemy. Frausin and Gigante were captured by the German Sicherheitsdienst on 28 August and 15 November 1944 respectively, interned and killed in the camp of Risiera di San Sabba.

A typical characteristic of the Garibaldi Brigades was the contrast attempt to transform the partisan formations into an avant-garde and constitutive element of the process of involving the populations in the active anti-fascism, with a continuous effort of integration between the armed fight and the civil mobilisation through their representatives. With a further organizational effort, communist leaders of Milan created in June 1944 the so-called "insurrection triumvirates" (triumvirati insurrezionali) at regional level, in order to coordinate the political struggle of the party among the occupied cities and in the workplaces through the concrete action of partisan mountain groups in view of a general insurrection.

== Insurrection and end of the war ==
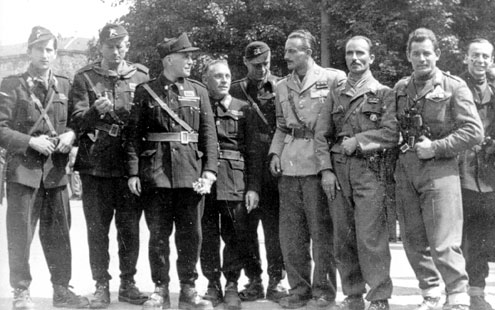
Commander of Garibaldi Brigades of Ossola (the first from the left is Aldo Aniasi)

On 10 April 1945, the general command of Brigate Garibaldi issued the "directive no. 16" which warned all the combatants to prepare themselves for the general insurrection in all of northern Italy in order to precede the Allied troops and cooperate for the defeat of Nazi-fascist forces. The general command of the brigades and the Communist Party emphasized the maximum importance of the insurrection which had to be done at any costs, without accepting any agreements, proposals, or truces with the enemy that could limit the action of partisans. Detailed plans were designed in order to enter into the cities, protect factories and plants and to prevent the run of Nazi-fascist forces. The insurrection began then on 24 and 25 April in the main cities of the north, after that the regional commands spread the codified message "Aldo dice 26x1" ("Aldo says 26x1").

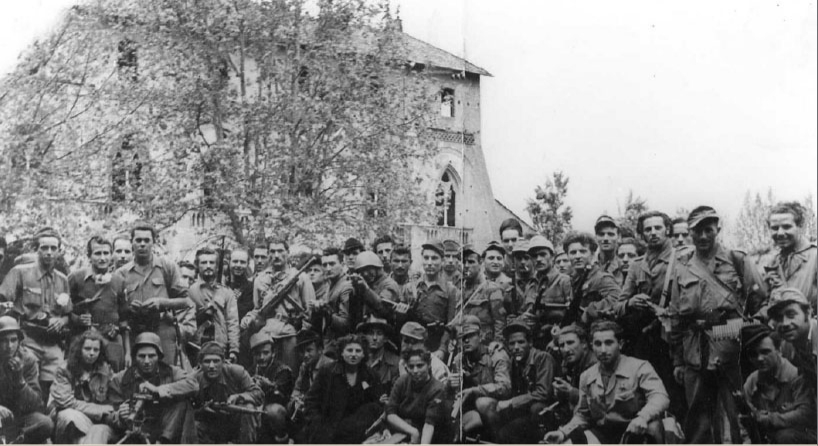
Garibaldini at the castle of Pavia, 25 April 1945

During this final phase, the Garibaldini formations, organized in "Divisions" and "Groups of Divisions" (like the grouping of Valsesia, Verbano and Ossola led by Moscatelli and Gastone), which had a central role in fights among the various cities of northern Italy. Mountain partisan brigades went to the plains and marched on the main centres, while the insurrection strike was proclaimed in the urban nuclei and GAP and SAP divisions began to fight. In Liguria, the Divisions of "Chichero" played an important role in the liberation of Genoa and impede the destruction of the harbour, accepting the surrender of German forces led by general Günther Meinhold. In Piedmont, Garibaldi Divisions of Pompeo Colajanni "Barbato", Vincenzo Modica and Giovanni Latilla "Nanni" entered in Turin together with the autonomous of "Mauri", while the Divisions "Pajetta" and "Fratelli Varalli" of Gastone and Moscatelli, after liberating Novara, entered in Milan on 28 April, already reached in the previous day by the Garibaldini of Oltrepò pavese led by Italo Pietra and Luchino Dal Verme. In Lombardy, the 2ª Divisione Garibaldi "Redi" (commanded by Aldo Aniasi "Comandante Iso") and the Divisioni "Lombardia", coordinated by Pietro Vergani ("Fabio", deputy commander of CVL) blocked the Alpine passes and occupied the Valtellina, preventing the run of fascist hierarchs. Benito Mussolini was captured by the 52ª Brigata Garibaldi "Luigi Clerici" of commander "Pedro" (Pier Luigi Bellini delle Stelle), subordinate to the 1ª Divisione Garibaldi Lombardia, and shot by envoys of the Garibaldi command of Milan, Walter Audisio and Aldo Lampredi; other hierarchs were instead captured and killed in Dongo by partisans of the 3ª Divisione Garibaldi Lombardia, under the orders of Alfredo Mordini "Riccardo".

In Veneto, the "Garemi", "Nannetti" and "Ortigara" Divisions stopped the German retreat and freed Padova, Valdagno and Belluno.

Severe problems of collaboration between the Italian partisans and the Slovenian formations of the People's Liberation Army of Yugoslavia arose on the eastern border, where the strong Slavic chauvinism, difficulties of Italian communist leaders and the contradictory aspects of their policy fostered divisions and anti-Slavic resentments within non-communist forces of the Resistance. On 20 September 1944, the general command of Slovenian PLA abolished unilaterally the agreements with the NLC done in April of the same year, which provided an Italian-Slovenian "equal command" on the formations. Consequently, most of the Italian units fell under the control of the Slovenian PLA and ceased to be formations of the Corpo Volontari della Libertà d'Italia. The commander and the political commissar adhered to the political and national solution of Yugoslavia and the political office of PCI supported that choice which involved only the communist militants. A the moment of the final insurrection, the "Trieste" formation, aggregated to the Divisione Garibaldi "Natisone" since 27 February 1945, participated to the fights and one group of it entered in Trieste on 7 May, while the biggest division was engaged in Ljubljana and entered into the city on 20 May, because an order of the Slovenian Communist Party hindered the participation of Italian partisan formations to the liberation of Trieste.

After the end of the military operations during the first days of May in 1945, Allies and NLC ordered the consignment of weapons and the dismantle of partisan units. Garibaldi Brigades, as other partisan formations, were formally disbanded and gave to Allies 215,000 rifles, 12,000 submachine guns, 5,000 machine guns, 5 000 handguns and 760 bazookas. However, among the Garibaldi partisans, there were distrust and fear of the return of reactionary forces, and only about 60% of the weapons were actually given, while communist partisans kept a conspicuous number of light weapons, caps, jackets, red handkerchiefs, backpacks and cartridge boxes. The hiding of weapons was partially allowed by some Garibaldi leaders of the north in sight of a possible reprise of the liberation war; during all the 50s, there were expectations of a return of war in mountains against the bourgeois state firmly placed in the capitalist field.

== Notable members ==
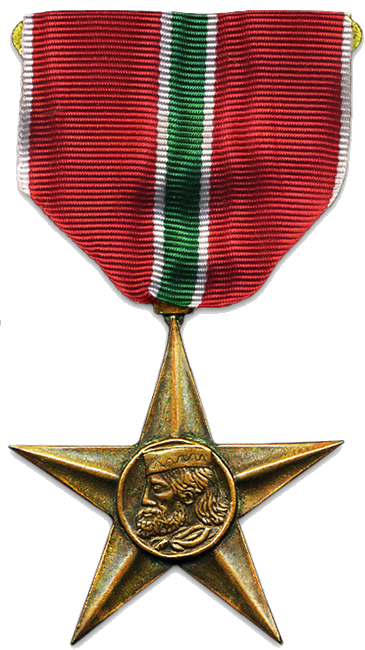
The Garibaldi Medal, awarded to members of the brigades

- Giorgio Amendola
- Aldo Aniasi
- Walter Audisio
- Arrigo Boldrini
- Italo Calvino
- Antonio Carini
- Pompeo Colajanni
- Anna Maria Princigalli
- Amilcare Debar
- Fernando Di Giulio
- Dante Di Nanni
- Riccardo Fedel
- Sergio Flamigni
- Aldo Gastaldi
- Antonio Giolitti
- Luigi Longo
- Marisa Diena
- Cino Moscatelli
- Giancarlo Pajetta
- Giovanni Pesce
- Claudia Ruggerini
- Francesco Scotti
- Pietro Secchia
- Emilio Sereni
- Walkiria Terradura
- Paolo Caccia Dominioni

== See also ==
- Brigate Fiamme Verdi
- Brigate Osoppo
- Gruppi di Azione Patriottica
- Spanish Civil War
- Garibaldi Battalion
- National Liberation Committee
- Italian resistance movement
- Vercelli psychiatric hospital massacre

== Bibliography ==
- Audisio, Walter (1975). In nome del popolo italiano. Milan: Teti.
- Battaglia, Roberto (1964). Storia della Resistenza italiana. Turin: Einaudi.
- Bermani, Cesare (1995–2000). Pagine di guerriglia. L'esperienza dei garibaldini della Valsesia. Istituto per la storia della Resistenza e della società contemporanea nelle province di Biella e Vercelli "Cino Moscatelli".
- Secchia, Pietro; Moscatelli, Cino (1958). Il Monte Rosa è sceso a Milano. Turin: Einaudi.
- Bocca, Giorgio (1996). Storia dell'Italia partigiana. Milan: Mondadori.
- Borgomaneri, Luigi (1985). Due inverni, un'estate e la rossa primavera: le Brigate Garibaldi a Milano e provincia (1943-1945). Milan: Franco Angeli.
- Carmagnola, Piero (2005). Vecchi partigiani miei. Milan: Angeli.
- Diena, Marisa (1970). Guerriglia e autogoverno: Brigate Garibaldi nel Piemonte occidentale 1943-1945. Parma: Guanda.
- Collotti, Enzo; Sessi, Frediano; Sandri, Renato (2000–2001). Dizionario della Resistenza (2 volumes ed.). Turin: Einaudi.
- Collotti, Enzo; Sessi, Frediano; Sandri, Renato (2006). Dizionario della Resistenza (single volume ed.). Turin: Einaudi.
- Enciclopedia dell'antifascismo e della Resistenza. Milan: La Pietra. 1968–1989.
- Fogliazza, Enrico (1985). Deo ed i cento cremonesi in Val Susa. Cremona.
- Gestro, Stefano (1981). La Divisione italiana partigiana "Garibaldi". Montenegro 1943-1945. Milan: Mursia.
- Jaksetich, Giorgio (1982). La brigata "Fratelli Fontanot". Partigiani italiani in Slovenia. Milan: La Pietra.
- Lazagna, Giambattista (1996). Ponte Rotto. Paderno Dugnano: Colibrì.
- Longo, Luigi (1973). I centri dirigenti del PCI nella Resistenza. Rome: Editori Riuniti.
- Maccagni, Leonardo (1945). Macao racconta. Memorie di un patriota. Fiorenzuola d'Arda.
- Mario Lizzero "Andrea". Il suo impegno civile, politico e sociale. Udine: Istituto friulano per la storia del movimento di liberazione. 1995.
- Istituto Gramsci, Istituto nazionale per la storia del movimento di liberazione in Italia (1979). Le Brigate Garibaldi nella Resistenza: documenti. Milan: Feltrinelli.
- Nozzoli, Guido (2005). Quelli di Bulow. Cronache della 28ª Brigata Garibaldi. Rome: Editori Riuniti.
- Parlato, Armando (1984). La Resistenza cremonese. Milan: La Pietra.
- Patat, Luciano (1999). Mario Fantini "Sasso" comandante della Divisione "Garibaldi Natisone". Udine: Istituto friulano per la storia del movimento di liberazione.
- Pavone, Claudio (1991). Una guerra civile. Saggio storico sulla moralità nella Resistenza. Turin: Bollati Boringhieri.
- Peli, Santo (2004). La Resistenza in Italia. Turin: Einaudi.
- Pesce, Giovanni (2007) [1967]. Senza tregua. La guerra dei GAP. Milan: Feltrinelli.
- Politica e organizzazione della Resistenza armata. Atti del Comando militare regionale veneto. Vicenza: Neri Pozza. 1992.
- Bera, Arnaldo "Luciano" (2002) [1986]. La Resistenza nel Cremonese. Appunti, ricordi, testimonianze dei protagonisti. Cremona: ANPI.
- Cerri, Carlo (1985). La Resistenza piacentina. Dall'avvento del fascismo alla Liberazione. Rome: Ediesse.
- Roggero, Roberto (2006). Oneri e onori: le verità militari e politiche della guerra di Liberazione in Italia. Milan: Greco e Greco.
- Ruzzenenti, Marino (1977). La 122ª brigata Garibaldi e la Resistenza nella Valle Trompia. Brescia: Nuova Ricerca.
- Scotti, Giacomo (1984). Juris, juris! All'attacco! La guerriglia partigiana ai confini orientali d'Italia 1943-1945. Milan: Mursia.
- Longo, Luigi; Secchia, Pietro. Storia del Partito comunista italiano. Turin: Einaudi.
- Sprega, Franco (2019). Il comandante che veniva dal mare. Giovanni lo Slavo nella 62ª brigata partigiana L. Evangelista. Fiorenzuola d'Arda: ANPI.
- Vaia, Alessandro (1977). Da galeotto a generale. Milan: Teti.
- Varese; Giulivo, Ricci (1997). La brigata garibaldina Cento Croci, 4ª zona operativa ligure. Storia e testimonianze. La Spezia: Giacché.
- Ginsborg, P. Storia d'Italia dal dopoguerra ad oggi.
