= Partisan Republic of Valsesia =

Italian partisan republic in 1944

Partisan Republic of Valsesia Repubblica partigiana della Valsesia
- 11 June 1944–10 July 1944
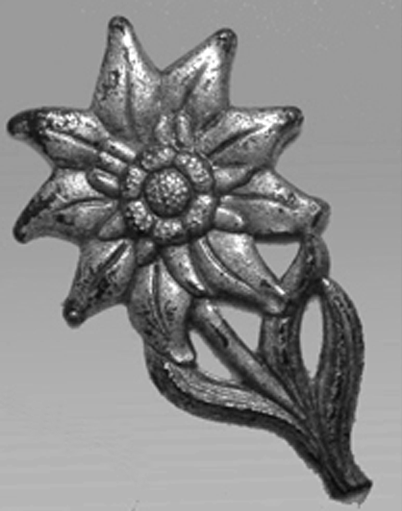
- Flag Coat of arms
- Capital: Varallo
- Official languages: Italian
- Government: Partisan republic
- History
  - Established: 11 June 1944
  - Disestablished: 10 July 1944
- Today part of: Italy

The Partisan Republic of Valsesia was the second partisan republic in northern Italy. It was proclaimed on June 11th, 1944, and lasted until July 10th, 1944, the day on which Nazi-Fascist reconquest operations in the area ended. However with due consideration, given the rapid development of the situation, some sources extend its duration to April 25, 1945.

Along with Montefiorino, Pietro Secchia considered it a precursor of the “schools of effective democracy that was born in the fire of struggle” that would later be the partisan free/republican zones.

== Territory ==
The liberated territory included all the valleys of the Sesia River, from Alagna Valsesia to the foot of Monte Rosa to Romagnano Sesia/Gattinara; the Val Grande from Alagna Valsesia to Varallo; the lower valley to Serravalle Sesia; the Morenica to Romagnano Sesia/Gattinara; and the three side valleys: Val Sermenza, Val Mastallone, and Val Sessera. It bordered Biellese, Lys Valley, Anzasca Valley, Novara, and Vercelli.

== History ==
=== Context ===
The Resistance in Valsesia began on the very evening of the armistice when, headed by the first citizen, Cav. Osella, the Valsesian Committee of Resistance had been formed in Varallo (lawyer Barbano, Peter Grober, Ezio Grassi, and lawyer Balossino were also members) [... ] on September 11, the Committee appointed Cino Moscatelli, a long-time member of the PCI's clandestine organization, and 'Ciro' (Eraldo Gastone) to command the military organization in Valsesia; charging them with overseeing the first collection centers immediately formed in some localities in the valley: at the Piane, Campertogno, Briasco, and Camasco.

=== Beginning ===
After more than six months of occupation of Valsesia, in June 1944 the 63rd Battalion (a Fascist unit specializing in anti-guerrilla warfare, later renamed the “Tagliamento” Legion) was assigned to the defense of the Gothic Line, in the belief that the partisan movement had been repressed. Fully disproving this belief, Resistance formations immediately descended into the major population centers of the valley floor, Varallo, and Borgosesia in particular, taking control of the territory from there. Despite the choice to resort to a non-democratic institutional form, the experience of the free zone brought the population considerably closer to the partisan movement.

In this context, a substantial group of carabinieri stationed in Varallo and the upper valley placed themselves at the service of the partisan forces.

=== Government ===
The “free zone” was born in a climate of great uncertainty and fear of enemy counterattack. Given the precariousness of the situation, the proposal of a CLNAI government, put forward by the committees themselves through the April 1944 directives, was discarded. Management was therefore entrusted to civilian commissioners, figures created on that specific occasion. In several localities the podestà themselves, if not invisible to the population or compromised with the newly fallen regime, were appointed commissioners. The civil commissioner had, among others, the delicate task of supervising all businesses and factories.

=== Economy and society ===
An agreement was reached with the industrialists to guarantee continuity of production: on the one hand they were prevented from working for the Germans and paying taxes to the Social Republic, and on the other hand they obtained assurances that they would not be subjected to acts of sabotage by the partisans.

Civil services (post, telephone, and communications) were not interrupted. Stockpiles imposed by the Social Republic were abolished, sales and price controls of quota items were introduced, and food rations and quantities of products periodically requisitioned by the Germans, such as wood, were increased. Company canteens were set up in factories and canteens for the unemployed and needy.

A Division “art office” was also active, making insignia (edelweiss on a red and blue field, distributed during August 1944, see sect. Insignia) and armbands for the various corps, stamps, postcards, and propaganda posters.

Numerous public initiatives are also recalled. By way of example, two events were held in Varallo: on June 23, 1944, a conference with a patriotic theme was organized; on July 25, a few days after the counterattack following the Nazi-Fascist roundups of July 2-19, the band held a concert.

=== Assistance ===
Several villas were requisitioned in Borgosesia and used as children's colonies and shelters for the elderly.

Health care was guaranteed thanks to the civilian clinic held by some partisan doctors, although the hospitals in Varallo and Borgosesia remained the reference points. Given the obvious distance from these centers, some quick courses for nurses were organized for the many young men who arrived at the Command but still lacked weapons and equipment.

=== Justice ===
On June 28, 1944, the leadership of the 1st Garibaldi Division, at the suggestion of Giuseppe Lacroix (Dr. “Red Primrose,” head of the inter-divisional health service of the Valsesia, Ossola, Cusio, Verbano and Biellese partisan formations) placed alongside the Varallo Sesia praetor a judicial commissioner, an expression of the National Liberation Committee itself, in charge of intervening in both civil and criminal cases: He received in view every trial file from the praetor, directed cases and ratified sentences, with the power to toughen or alleviate the penalties imposed. The praetor and commissioner, however, had equal decision-making weight; in case of disagreement, the military authority had the final say.

In contrast, the jurisdiction of military offenses remained with the divisional command. Spies and collaborationists were immediately sentenced to death by hanging. For juvenile offenders, parents were held responsible.

Dealing with the profile of justice in the territories liberated by the Resistance, historian Tullio Omezzoli does not fail to point out some of the negative aspects of what has just been outlined: although formally on the same level as the praetor, the figure of the commissar had substantially more weight; the power of the commissar to vary punishments according to “the social nature of the crimes and the social category of the perpetrators” was a clear principle of class justice; the final word that the military authority had in the sphere of ordinary justice took away any autonomy from the latter.

=== Defense ===
The 'Red Flying' Battalion was established to provide military coverage in the area. Equipped with vehicles and heavy weaponry, it could move swiftly and defend the valley effectively.

It should also be mentioned that the establishment of the free zone corresponded to numerous enlistments, which fed the ranks of the Resistance beyond measure: these were mainly the young conscripts recalled to arms, mostly from the plains. However, such a mass of recruits suffered from severe logistical management difficulties, lacking weapons, provisions, and time to train them for guerrilla warfare.

=== The End ===
As Nazi-Fascist units were about to return, the partisan commands opted to move their forces toward Alagna, in order thus to proceed with the disengagement through the side valleys, according to the tactic established during the April roundup. Given the volume of recently acquired recruits, however, more than a thousand people had to be mobilized in July, many of them unfamiliar with the mountains and without adequate footwear: the disengagement turned into a disorderly retreat, during which numerous fighters were arrested, abetted by a network of informers loyal to the regime. Nazi-Fascist operations lasted from July 2 to 10, 1944. On July 12, a team of ten carabinieri carrying explosives intended to blow up bridges over the Sesia River was finally intercepted and arrested, to delay the Nazi-Fascists' advance and gain valuable time for disengagement operations.

Among those arrested, eight Carabinieri and seven partisans were shot at the cemetery in Alagna by an Italian SS unit (Höchster SS und Polizeiführer Italien/SSPF Oberitalien-West) on the orders of Lieutenant Guido Pisoni on the following July 14.

== Historiography ==
The historiography has repeatedly reported the Valsesia experience, both in terms of a “free zone” and as a “republic”.

In 1947 it was referred to as a “free zone” by Luigi Longo (“liberated all of a sudden [...] by boldly chasing back and chasing after fascists who had come to rake them”) and by Italo Pietra and Remo Muratore, although both sources use the two expressions interchangeably, consistent with different treatments of those years.

The first distinction was introduced by Roberto Battaglia the following decade: in 1953 the Roman historian placed Valsesia in the first phase of the free zones, which arose in the summer of 1944 and focused on economic and administrative activities (to the second phase, in the autumn of 1944 and characterized by more purely political activities, belong instead the Ossola and Carnia).

In the late 1960s, historian Massimo Legnani delves into the experiences of the summer of 1944, noting how they were closely linked to the expected final Allied offensive, which, however, would not come. Another characterizing factor was the difficulty of communication and collaboration between military and political resistance: with each other, internally, and with the population. He therefore proposes two criteria for identifying “republics” in the broader set of “free zones”. On one hand, "republics" represent situations where prolonged and intense administrative and political interventions shaped the Resistance itself, foreshadowing the future structure of local life that the movement would eventually establish. On the other hand, Massimo Legnani reserves the definition of “republic” only for those territories that saw effective and balanced collaboration (“non-overlapping”) between partisan commands and political-administrative bodies.

At the turn of the century, opinions still differed: in 1995 Raimondo Luraghi defined it as a “republic”, while in 2000 Luca Baldissara counted it among “partisan settlement zones,” as distinct from “free zones with recognizable borders” (including Ossola).

A more precise distinction for classifying Piedmont's free zones was provided in 2013 by Gabriella Spigarelli: by placing the time limit at one month, the geographic limit at 1,000 km², and the demographic limit at 10,000 inhabitants, the definition is reduced to only eight realities, including Valsesia and Ossola.

In 2014, in ANPI's Patria magazine, Valsesia was defined as a “free zone”.

=== Dispute ===
The Historiology of the “republic” of Valsesia (so named by the CLNAI) suffered from the opposition it received within the partisan factions themselves, foremost among them Moscatelli, who rejected its political institution by relegating it to a mere “free zone.” Opposition materialized in practices tending to downplay its importance, carried on by both the ANPI and some local historians.

It is historically well-established that Moscatelli was opposed to any republican form (a position confirmed in the days of the Ossola Republic), which is why he inclined not to leave its memory.

In recent years, historians, writers, and researchers of the subject have shed light on the unclear aspects of the early postwar years, objectively rereading both the correspondence between CLNAI and the Valsesia Division and the publications of the clandestine press of the time. (La Stella Alpina).

== Garibaldi Brigades “2nd Valsesia Division” ==
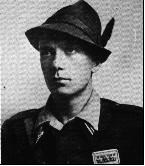
Cino Moscatelli, political commander of the Valsesia Division.

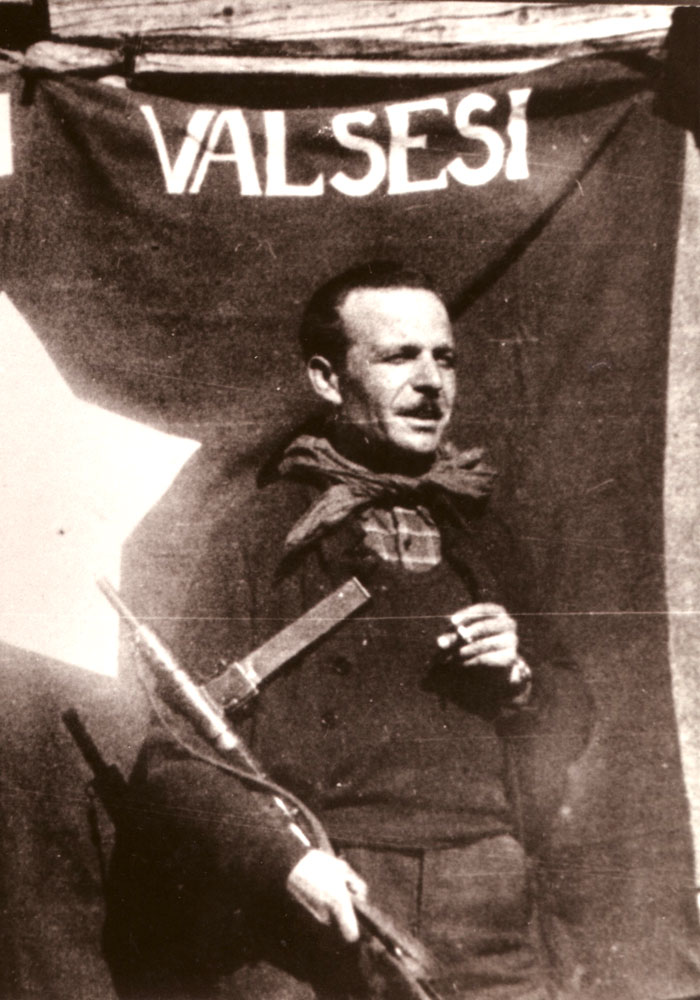
“Ciro” Eraldo Gastone, military commander of the Valsesia Division

The “Valsesia” operational zone of the volunteers of freedom corps, also having jurisdiction over Ossola and Cusio, was headed by an Area Command under whose dependencies operated the “Garibaldi” brigades (and their dependent units) framed in four divisions.

Garibaldi formations were structured as follows: squads consisted of ten to fifteen men; three squads formed a detachment, three detachments formed a battalion, three battalions formed a brigade, and three brigades formed a division.

The following is a list of the divisions and brigades and their commands:

- Military Zone Command “Valsesia”, Military Commander: Eraldo Gastone (Ciro) War Commissioner: Vincenzo Moscatelli (Cino) Chief of Staff: Aldo Benoni (Aldo);
- Garibaldi Division “Fratelli Varalli”, Military Commander: Albino Calletti (Bruno) War Commissioner: Mario Venanzi (Michele);
- 6th Garibaldi Brigade “Nello” (initially 6th B. G. “Rocco”), Military Commander: Attilio Sforza (Atti);
- 7th Garibaldi Brigade “Valsesia”, Military Commander: Dino Vicario (Barbis) (later commander of G. Division “Redi”);
- 81st Garibaldi Brigade “Volante Silvio Loss”, Military Commander: Corrado Moretti (Fulvio);
- 82nd Garibaldi Brigade “Giuseppe Osella”, Military Commander: Mario Vinzio (Pesgu) War Commissioner: Don Sisto Bighiani (Sisto);
- 84th Garibaldi Brigade “Strisciante Musati”, Military Commander: Pietro Rastelli (Pedar) War Commissioner: Giacomo Gray (Grano);
- Garibaldi Division “Gaspare Pajetta”, Military Commander: Arrigo Gruppi (Moro);
- 109th Garibaldi Brigade “Piero Tellaroli”, Military Commander: Attilio Bozzotti (Varesot) War Commissioner: Giovanni Barbone (Cori);
- 110th Garibaldi Brigade “Elio Fontanella”, Military commander: Franco Alliatta (Dich) War commissioner: Alessandro Rista (Alexander);
- 118th Garibaldi Brigade “Remo Servadei”, Military Commander: Aramando Caldara (Armando) Commissioner of War: Ubaldo Papa (Aldo Tuto);
- 124th Garibaldi Brigade “Pizio Greta”, Military Commander: Alessandro Boca (Andrei) Commissioner of War: Aldo Petacchi (Aldo);
- Garibaldi Youth Front “Eugenio Curiel”, Brigade, Military commander: Franco Penna (Franco) War commissioner: Diego Fortina (Walter).

Present in Valsesia but framed in the 1st Assault Division “Garibaldi”:

- Carabinieri Partisan Company, Military Commander: Marshal Major Tarcisio Ballarani.

In Ossola and Cusio:

- Garibaldi Division “Redi”;
- Garibaldi Division “Mario Flaim”.

=== Insignia ===
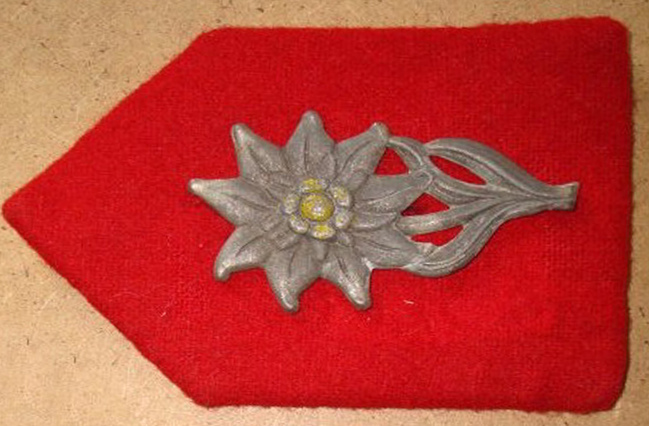
Valsesian partisan divisions' insignia.

Created in late August 1944, they were ordered in 15,000 pieces from a firm in Milan by Vincenzo Moscatelli through the brother of Eraldo Gastone, respectively political commissar and commander of the Valsesia, Ossola, Cusio and Verbano Divisions grouping. The company replied that it did not feel safe to produce them fearing for the safety of its workers, as the risk of Nazi retaliation was too high. It was therefore thought to circumvent the obstacle by making them similar to those of the German Gebirgsjäger: different only in having on the stem an extra leaflet and a shorter one, and the pollen, in the center, not golden. If a check had occurred, the company could have passed the order off as a Wehrmacht request. The Garibaldini of Valsesia and Ossola thus had their insignia.

=== The Hymn ===
The partisan hymn Valsesia Valsesia, whose melody is derived from Dalmazia, Dalmazia, is an old tune sung first by the Arditi and then by the Dannunziani. It was used and became the anthem of the San Marco Division of the 10th MAS. Later, the partisans of Valsesia reworked it so that it rose to the anthem of the “Valsesia Division” and one of the best-known songs in the area.

Italian lyrics	English translation
Quando si tratta di attaccare noi del Moscatelli siamo i primi tutti si fermano a guardare tutti si affacciano ai balcon Contro i tedeschi e repubblichini combatteremo siam partigiani ai nostri monti l'abbiam giurato dobbiamo vincere o morir Valsesia! Valsesia! cosa importa se si muore questo è il grido del valore partigiano vincerà Quando si tratta di attaccare Quelli del "Pedar" sono i primi tutti cominciano a sparare e dalla Valsesia vincerem A Moscatelli l'abbiam giurato Ai nostri morti gridiam così Ai nostri monti l'abbiam giurato Vogliamo vincere o morire Valsesia! Valsesia! cosa importa se si muore questo è il grido del valore partigiano vincerà Valsesia! Valsesia! cosa importa se si muore questo è il grido del valore partigiano vincerà	When it comes to attacking we at Moscatelli are the first everyone stops to watch all face the balconies Against the Germans and republicans we will fight we are partisans To our mountains we have sworn it we must win or die Valsesia! Valsesia! what does it matter if you die this is the cry of valor partisan will win When it comes to attack Those of the ''Pedar" (Note: Each Garibaldi Brigade used the battle name of its commander) are the first Everyone starts shooting and from Valsesia we will win To Moscatelli we have sworn it To our dead we cry thus To our mountains we have sworn it We want to win or die Valsesia! Valsesia! what does it matter if you die this is the cry of bravery partisan will win Valsesia! Valsesia! what does it matter if you die this is the cry of courage partisan will win

== Honors ==
Italian military bravery gold medal bar

On September 9, 1973, the city of Varallo gave rise to the honor based on the following facts:

Rebelling against Nazi-Fascist occupation, Valsesia fought for twenty months the hard partisan war for national liberation. Expertise of leaders, the value of thousands of partisans and patriots of aggressive, maneuvering formations, risky and passionate solidarity of the populations to the Resistance, engaged hard, with weapons and means taken from the enemy and insidious hostility of the environment, numerous garrisons and huge operational units of the occupier, inflicting on him, with combat and sabotage, significant human and material losses and excessive wear and tear of forces. Subjected to roundups, bloody repression, and destruction, irreducible, it did not bow to the oppressor, and hundreds of fallen in arms, dozens slaughtered in reprisal testify to the tribute of bravery and suffering, with which the combatants and the people of Valsesia by joint military and civilian virtues opposed the oppressor with the invincible force of love for the freedom and independence of the Fatherland.

== Bibliography ==
- Zandano, Giannii (1957). La Lotta di Liberazione nella Provincia di Vercelli [The Liberation Struggle in the Province of Vercelli] (in Italian). Vercelli: SETE.
- Bocca, Giorgio (1964). Una repubblica partigiana. Ossola, 10 settembre - 23 ottobre 1944 [A partisan republic. Ossola, September 10 - October 23, 1944] (in Italian). Il Saggiatore.
- Secchia, Pietro (1973). "Le zone libere - La zona libera della Valsesia". Istituto Giangiacomo Feltrinelli: 514–524 – via Google books.
- Giabardo, Marco (2011). Valsesia! Valsesia! - Storia di una repubblica assassinata [Valsesia! Valsesia! - History of a murdered republic] (in Italian). Storia Ribelle.

=== Further reading ===
- Pajetta, Giancarlo (Marra) (1945). Con i garibaldini in Valsesia [With the Garibaldini in Valsesia] (in Italian). Roma: L'Unità.
- Benoni, Aldo (1946). Con questa mostrina - Ai nostri caduti [With this insignia - To our fallen soldiers] (in Italian). Novara: ANPI Provinciale.
- Secchia and Moscatelli, Pietro and Cino (1958). "Il Monte Rosa è sceso a Milano: la Resistenza nel Biellese, nella Valsesia e nella Valdossola". PGreco. ISBN 978-88-6802-340-9 – via Google books.
- Bracco, Cesarina (1976). La staffetta garibaldina [Garibaldi's relay] (in Italian). Pollone: Leone & Griffa.
- Barbaglia, Ester (1979). La Spezia combatte in Valsesia [The Spice Fights in Valsesia] (in Italian). Borgosesia: Istituto per la storia della Resistenza in provincia di Vercelli.
- Ambrosio, Piero (1980). I notiziari della Gnr della provincia di Vercelli all'attenzione del duce [Gnr newsletters from the province of Vercelli to the attention of the leader.] (in Italian). Istituto per la storia della Resistenza e della società contemporanea in provincia di Vercelli.
- Barbano, Enzo (1982). Lo scontro a fuoco di Varallo del 2 dicembre 1943 [The Varallo firefight of December 2, 1943] (in Italian). Istituto per la storia della Resistenza in provincia di Vercelli.
- Barbano, Enzo (1985). Il paese in rosso e nero [The Villages in Red and Black] (in Italian). Varallo: Comune di Varallo.
- "Memory of Cino Moscatelli" (PDF). Istituto per la storia della Resistenza e della società contemporanea nelle province di Biella e Vercelli. 2. 1982 – via Fondazione CRT.
- Ambrosio and Motta, Pietro and Gadys (1986). Sui muri della Valsesia. Settembre 1943 - aprile 1945 [On the Walls of Valsesia. September 1943 - April 1945] (in Italian). Istituto per la storia della Resistenza e della società contemporanea in provincia di Vercelli.
- Bermani, Cesare (1995–2000). Pagine di guerriglia. L'esperienza dei garibaldini della Valsesia [Guerrilla Pages. The experience of the garibaldini of Valsesia.] (in Italian). Borgosesia: Istituto per la storia della Resistenza e della società contemporanea nelle province di Biella e Vercelli.
- Borgo, Alfredo (1995). Un abito celeste [A Heavenly Suit] (in Italian). Borgosesia: Corradini.
- Vallauri, Carlo (2014). Le Repubbliche partigiane: Esperienze di autogoverno democratico [Partisan Republics: Experiences of democratic self-government] (in Italian). Laterza.
