= Marisa Diena =

French-Jewish resistance fighter

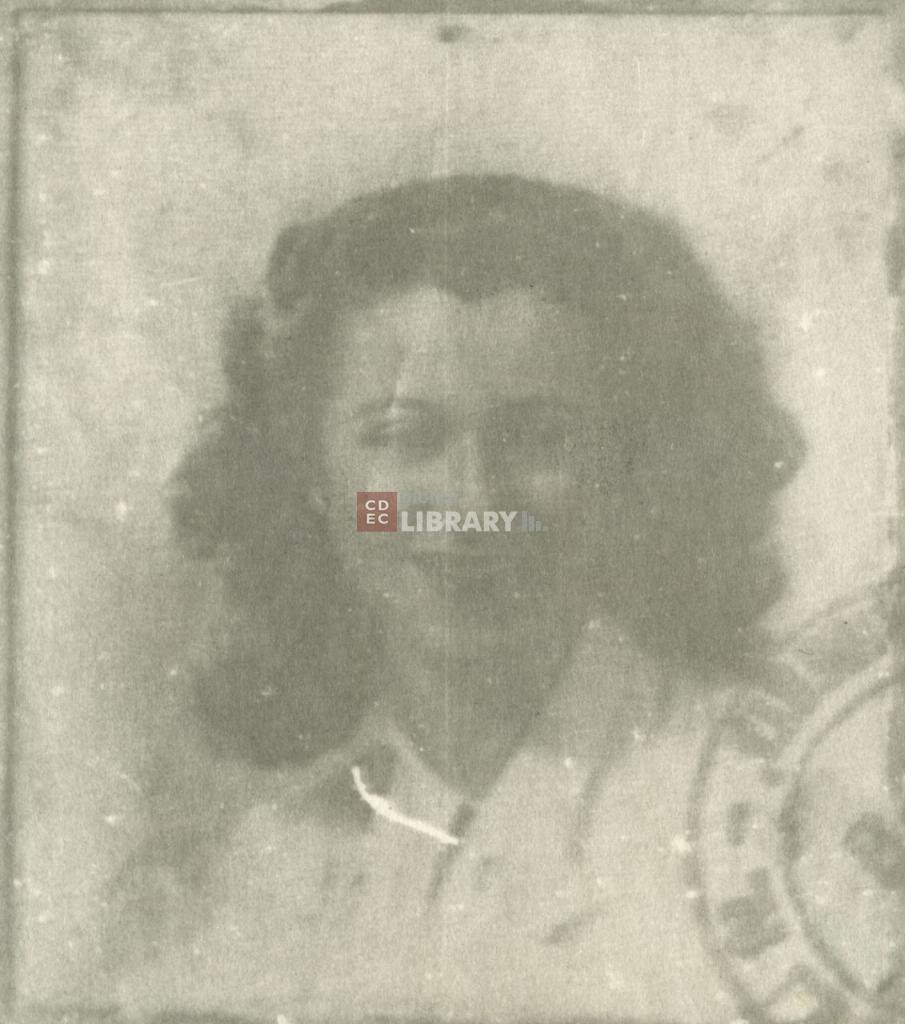
Marisa Diena

Marisa Diena (September 29, 1916 – May 8, 2013) was an Italian-Jewish resistance fighter active in World War II. She was a member of the Garibaldi Brigades, a communist partisan resistance group operating in the Torre Pellice mountains. Described as "small and pretty, with curly reddish hair" by fellow partisan Silvia Pons, Marisa was a vital member of Italian resistance efforts.

== Early life ==
Marisa Diena was born in Turin to Jewish parents Giorgina and Mario Diena in 1916, in the midst of post-WWI turmoil. They were a middle-class family, her father being a printer with a local factory in Turin, though financial irregularity caused him to spend some time in prison. She had two younger brothers, Giorgio and Franco. During her early childhood in Italy, fascism was on the rise, spearheaded by Benito Mussolini.

== Fascism in Italy ==
On March 23, 1919, when Marisa was three, Benito Mussolini officially launched his fascist movement, officially known as the Italian Combat Fascists. In 1921, the movement gained a seat in congress and was officially recognized as the National Fascist Party. Shortly after, in October 1922, the Fascist party marched on Rome and seized control of the Italian government, declaring Mussolini the new Prime Minister. Marisa was eight at the time. By 1928, all opposing political parties were abolished and democratic pretenses were discarded, cementing Mussolini as the effective dictator of Italy. As a child growing up in a fascist-run state, Marisa was encouraged to embrace fascism. However, sometime after June 1940, when Mussolini declared war on France and England, Marisa and her family moved to Rome. They moved back in 1943 after Mussolini fell from power. On September 8, 1943, Italy joined forces with Germany and was relabeled as the Italian Social Republic, conceding to Nazi control.

== Partisan fighting ==
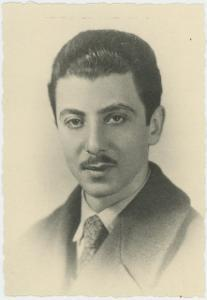
Giorgio Diena

Following the German invasion of 1943, the standing underground opposition to fascism emerged as direct, open, and armed resistance. A few days after Nazi occupation of Turin, Italy, Marisa left to join resistance fighting in the mountains of Torre Pellice. She joined the 4th Garibaldi Brigades, a communist partisan resistance group, headed by Pompeo Colajanni. Opposed to the growing Fascist power, the Garibaldi unit was responsible for establishing local committees in the nearby Torre Pollice region in order to further organize strikes and distribute rations. They were the largest umbrella organization of communist partisan groups from 1943 to 1945. Her brothers Franco and Giorgio Diena were also a part of the resistance fighting.

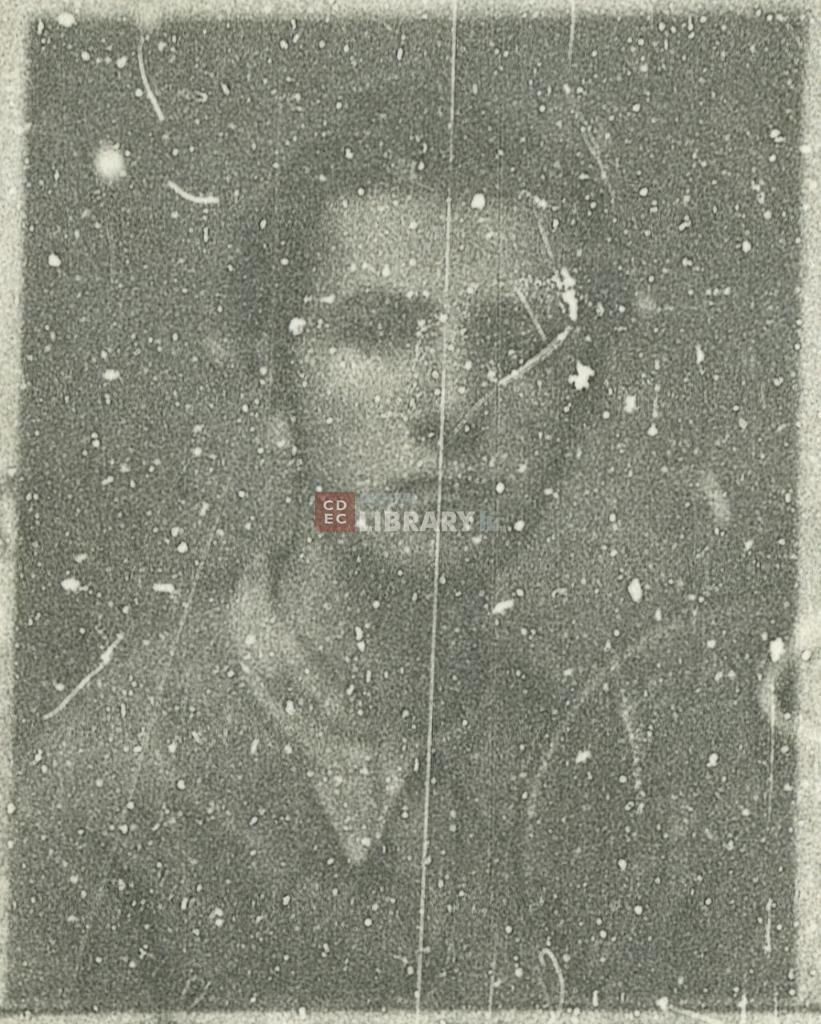
Franco Diena

As a woman who passed as Aryan, Marisa was able to use the inherent prejudice against women in her favor, traveling unnoticed and unscrutinized by Nazi forces. During this time she went by the name of Mara, her nom de guerre for her partisan actions, acquiring false identification papers for her activities. Due to her ability to move around in broad daylight, Marisa initially acted as a courier and message deliverer, riding her bicycle from home to home to spread news and intel. The information she collected was then relayed back to the brigade commander. She also took on the role of a trainer, instructing other local women and teaching them to be part of the resistance fighting. Marisa was promoted to the Vice-Commander of Information services for her brigade in 1944. That same year, on September 26, 1944, Marisa's 19-year-old brother Franco was gunned down in the mountains during a skirmish with fascist soldiers.

With over 300,000 partisan fighters in Northern Italy, a national liberation committee was created in the early months of 1945. Collectively they pushed forward to liberate Italy from fascist control, Marisa's brigade liberating Turin on April 25, 1945.

== Later life ==
Marisa continued to remain active in her country's politics after the end of World War II, remaining involved with the Italian Communist Party. In 1949, she joined the PCI national female school as a teacher, returning to Turin in 1953 and becoming the female leader of the communist Piedmontese regional committee. She ceased her official commitment to the party in 1957 and became a middle school teacher in 1958. She published an autobiography of her life in 1970, titled "Guerriglia e autogoverno: Brigate Garibaldi nel Piemonte occidentale 1943-1945", and continued to involve herself in the National Association of Italian Partisans throughout the remainder of her life. She died on May 8, 2013, in her home country of Italy.

== Bibliography ==
- United States Holocaust Memorial Museum. "Marisa Diena." Holocaust Encyclopedia. Accessed on 2/26/24.
- Penn, Shana. "Jewish Women Partisans." Shalvi/Hyman Encyclopedia of Jewish Women. June 23, 2021. Jewish Women's Archive. (Viewed on February 26, 2024).
- Moorehead, Caroline. A House in the Mountains: The Woman who Liberated Italy from Fascism, Penguin Books, 2019.
- Diena, Marisa. Interview 41822. Interview by Eleonora Bisotti. Visual History Archive, USC Shoah Foundation, April 30, 1998. Accessed March 4, 2024.
- Diena, Marisa (1970). Guerriglia e autogoverno: Brigate Garibaldi nel Piemonte occidentale 1943-1945 (in Italian). Guanda.
- Admin, Content (April 19, 2017). "Marisa Diena". Jewish Partisan Educational Foundation. Retrieved March 6, 2024.
- "Italy - Republic, Salo, Occupation | Britannica". www.britannica.com. Retrieved March 5, 2024.
- Gasco, Anna (January 7, 2016). "Biblioteca Nazionale Di Napoli". Retrieved March 21, 2024.
- "Mussolini: Speech of the 10 June 1940, Declaration of War on France and England « Historical Resources About The Second World War". Retrieved April 9, 2024.
- "The Rise of Benito Mussolini". May 9, 2008. Archived from the original on May 9, 2008. Retrieved April 9, 2024.
