= Cino Moscatelli =

Italian Resistance leader and politician

Vincenzo Moscatelli
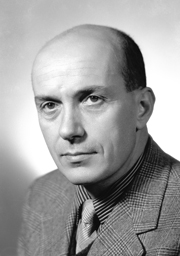
- Moscatelli in 1948, after becoming Senator
- Born: Vincenzo Moscatelli; 3 February 1908; Novara, Kingdom of Italy
- Died: 31 October 1981 (aged 73); Borgosesia, Italy
- Military career
- Commands: 6th Garibaldi Brigade
- Conflicts: Italian Civil War
- Awards: Silver Medal of Military Valor; Bronze Star Medal; Krzyż Partyzancki

Vincenzo Moscatelli, better known as Cino Moscatelli (3 February 1908 – 31 October 1981) was an Italian Resistance leader during World War II. After the war he became a politician in the Italian Communist Party, serving in the Italian Constituent Assembly, the Italian Senate and the Italian Chamber of Deputies.

== Biography ==
=== Early life and anti-fascist activity ===
Vincenzo Moscatelli was born in Novara on 3 February 1908, in the working-class district of Sant'Andrea, to railway worker Enrico Moscatelli and housewife Carmelita Usellini. He was the fourth of seven children; growing up in the suburbs of Novara, he began attending the Railway Worker's Circle, "den of 'reds' and revolutionaries", from an early age. In one instance he organized a strike to protest against the lack of wood for the heating of the school, also involving the high school boys, and in July 1922, during the so-called "battle of Novara" which saw fascists and anti-fascists confront each other, he participated in the defense of the local Chamber of Labor, by throwing stones on the attacking squadristi. At the end of the sixth grade he abandoned his studies and took up a job as an apprentice at the Rumi factory and then, later, after attending a professional course with evening classes, as a turner at the mechanical workshops of Novara. During a strike organized by him in 1925 he joined the Communist youth, and started participating in clandestine activity. In the meantime, he worked in factories in Novara and later moved to Milan, where he started working at Alfa Romeo and then at Cerutti.

In 1927 he was forced to leave the country and moved to Switzerland, where he attended a school of the Italian Communist Party (PCI) near Basel and became an official of the clandestine organization of the Communist Party of Italy. He then attended another party school in Berlin until October 1927, when he was sent to Moscow, where he remained until January 1930, when he moved to France, starting to work in the foreign center of the Party. Together with Pietro Secchia he wrote La lotta della gioventù proletaria contro il fascismo ("The Struggle of Proletarian Youth Against Fascism"), a booklet distributed clandestinely in Italy. Having returned to Italy under a false name, he carried out political activities as interregional secretary of the Communist Youth Federation of Italy (FGCd'I) for Emilia Romagna in the wake of the new policy inaugurated by the Italian Communists in the aftermath of the 'turning point', decided by the 6th World Congress of the Comintern (1928) and the 10th Plenum of its executive committee (1929), which included, among other things, the resumption of clandestine activity in Italy despite the harshness of the Fascist repression.

On 8 November of the same year he was arrested in Bologna after being discovered while organizing clandestine demonstrations to celebrate the anniversary of the October Revolution, and referred to the Special Court for the Defense of the State, which sentenced him to sixteen years and eight months in prison, perpetual ban from public offices, three years of special supervision and a 2,000 lire fine for having reconstituted the PCI, for communist propaganda, for use of false documents and clandestine expatriation. He was incarcerated in Volterra, where he remained in solitary confinement for three months after organizing a protest, then in Civitavecchia (together with Pietro Secchia, Umberto Terracini, Leo Valiani and Manlio Rossi-Doria), and finally in Alessandria. He was released in December 1935, due to an amnesty, and subjected to probation. On 8 March 1937, he was again arrested in Serravalle Sesia under charges of having written subversive sentences on the walls of the local paper mill. After six months in the Vercelli prison he was released after writing a letter in which he repudiated communism, but remained under strict police control. The letter caused his expulsion from the PCI, after which he set aside his political activity, returned to his native Borgosesia where he opened a commercial office and, in 1938, married Maria Leoni, who gave him two daughters, Carla and Nadia.

=== World War II ===
On 26 July 1943, the day after the fall of the Fascist regime, he staged a demonstration in Borgosesia and took direction of the anti-fascist movement in the Valsesia, restoring contacts with other anti-fascists and especially with Secchia. After the proclamation of Armistice of Cassibile on 8 September 1943, he was among the promoters of the Valsesian Committee of Resistance (which later became the local Committee for National Liberation), which started organizing disbanded soldiers and anti-fascists into armed partisan groups. Arrested on 29 October by the Carabinieri at the request of the German command of Vercelli, he was promptly freed by his comrades and by citizens who attacked the barracks. He then took refuge on Monte Briasco, where along with Eraldo Gastone (nom de guerre "Ciro", while Moscatelli became known as "Cino") he organized guerrilla actions with the "Gramsci" partisan group, which started its first clashes against the Germans and Fascists in December 1943. The number of followers of Ciro and Cino quickly grew, and the "Gramsci" group soon became the 6th Garibaldi Brigade, active in the Valsesia.

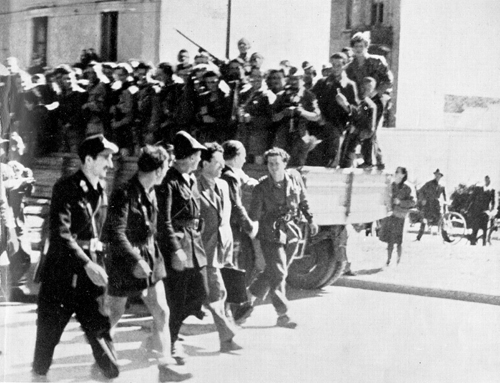
Moscatelli (third from left, with Alpini hat) in Milan with Pietro Secchia and Luigi Longo, on 28 April 1945

In the winter of 1943-1944 and the spring of 1944 the Garibaldi partisans in the Valsesia were repeatedly target by offensives carried out by the "Tagliamento" Legion of the National Republican Guard, but on 10 June 1944, they managed to force the German and Fascist garrison to withdraw from the valley, establishing a free zone of 763 square kilometres, in which some 60,000 people lived.

In this period Moscatelli and Gastone reorganized the partisan groups and formed a partisan division in Valsesia and, in the following months, another in Ossola. Moscatelli became political commissar, until the Liberation, of the Groupment of Garibaldi Divisions Valsesia-Ossola-Cusio-Verbano, while Gastone was appointed its military commander. By the end of the war, Moscatelli and Gastone had three thousand partisans under their command, divided into four divisions and twelve brigades, and were directly subordinated to the General Command of the Garibaldi Brigades and the General Command of the Corpo Volontari della Libertà.

In April 1945 the Garibaldi forces headed by Moscatelli participated in the liberation of Novara and then entered in Milan, where Moscatelli participated in the great partisan rally held in Piazza Duomo along with Luigi Longo and other leaders of the CLNAI. For his merits in the partisan struggle, Moscatelli received the rank of lieutenant colonel and a Silver Medal of Military Valor from Italy, the Bronze Star Medal from the United States, and the Krzyż Partyzancki from Poland.

=== Postwar political activity ===
After the end of the hostilities, he became mayor of Novara and deputy to the Italian Constituent Assembly for the PCI in the Turin-Novara-Vercelli district, gaining 45,282 votes. In the third De Gasperi cabinet he served as Undersecretary to the Presidency of the Council of Ministers for assistance to veterans and partisans. In 1948 he became a member of the Italian Senate, and in 1953 and 1958 he was elected to the Italian Chamber of Deputies. At the same time he carried out intense organizational activity in the PCI and in the National Association of Partisans of Italy (ANPI) with the aim of preserving the history of the Resistance, founding in Borgosesia in October 1974 the Institute for the history of the Resistance and of contemporary society in the provinces of Biella and Vercelli, which was named after him the year after his death, with occurred in Borgosesia in 1981.
