= Amilcare Debar =

Italian Sinto partisan

Amilcare Debar (1927–2010) was an Italian Sinto partisan who fought in the Italian resistance movement.

== Life ==
Amilcare Debar was born in Frossasco, Turin on 16 June 1927. Orphaned, he was sent with his sister to a home in Cuneo and known as Taro. During World War II, Debar was captured by the fascists and lined up with 18 other partisans to be shot. He was released at the last minute and fled into the mountains where he joined the resistance. He fought under Pompeo Colajanni in the Dante di Nanni battalion of the 48th Garibaldi Brigade, taking the name Corsaro. After being captured by the Nazis, he was sent to the Auschwitz and Mauthausen concentration camps.

After the war, he first worked as policeman in Racconigi then after a chance meeting with his half-brother on a police traffic stop, rejoined his family and lived nomadically. He later represented the Sinti people at the United Nations. He received the official recognition as partisan by president and former partisan Sandro Pertini.

Debar died on 12 December 2010.
