= Walkiria Terradura =

Italian anti-fascist partisan (1924–2023)

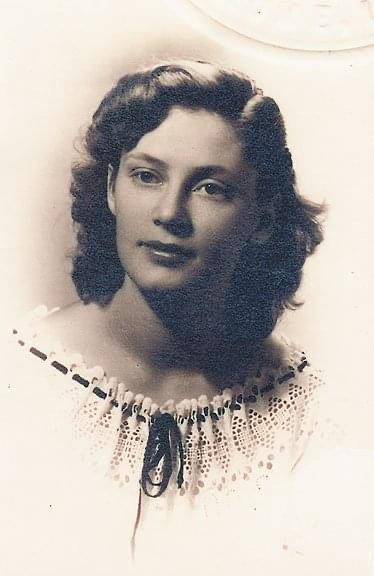
- Portrait of Terradura, 1930s
- Born: 9 January 1924; Gubbio, Italy
- Died: 5 July 2023 (aged 99); Rome, Italy
- Known for: Partisan
- Spouse: Alfonso Thiele
- Awards: Silver Medal of Military Valour

Walkiria Terradura (9 January 1924 – 5 July 2023) was an Italian anti-fascist partisan during the Second World War. She was awarded the Silver Medal of Military Valour.

== Biography ==
Terradura was born on 9 January 1924 in Gubbio, Perugia. As one of five children of committed antifascist lawyer Gustavo Terradura and his wife Laura, she witnessed her father's harassment and imprisonment several times during her youth. Her contemptuous attitude towards the fascist regime in Italy at the time earned her repeated admonishments at school and interrogations at the police headquarters.

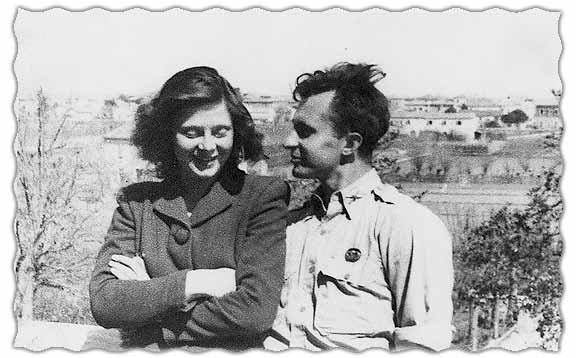
Terradura with Alfonso Thiele in 1945

Following school, Terradura studied law at the University of Perugia. In January 1944, when agents of the OVRA raided her home looking to arrest her father, she hid him and they subsequently fled to the Monti del Burano to join partisan formations in that area.

They joined the Garibaldi Brigades operating in the province of Pesaro Urbino, specifically the fifth battalion, under commander Samuele Panichi. Her sister Lionella joined the same group. The only woman in a squad of six that took the name Settebello, Terradura was voted squad leader. Terradura specialized in mines and explosives, undertaking operations to destroy bridges to hinder the movements of the German Nazi and Italian fascist armies. She became a symbol of women's commitment to the resistance movement during the war. There were eight different arrest warrants against her, but she was never captured.

During the war, Terradura met her future husband Alfonso Thiele, a captain of the Office of Strategic Services; they were married after the war and briefly lived in the United States. After returning to Italy, she remained active in politics and in the veterans' organisation, the National Association of Italian Partisans.

Terradura died on 5 July 2023, at age 99. Her funeral was held in Campidoglio, Rome, two days later, attended by partisan Iole Mancini, and her daughter Serenella, among others.

== Recognition ==
By presidential decree on 26 June 1970, Terradura's citation for military valour notes:

A woman with a strong and generous spirit, she joined the partisan formations in her region despite her young age, bringing enthusiasm and confidence. In many months of struggle she participated in numerous actions against the well-equipped adversary, showing uncommon skills of courage and initiative. After succeeding in blowing up a road bridge with the squad she commanded, noticing the arrival of an enemy unit, oblivious to the greater imbalance of forces, with a single supporter she attacked the enemy with hand grenades, inflicting heavy losses, causing them to flee and recovering abandoned vehicles and weapons. A compelling example of determination, courage and noble patriotic spirit.

— Marche, 4 October 1943 − 27 August 1944
