= Alfonso Thiele =

Italian-American racing driver (1920–1986)

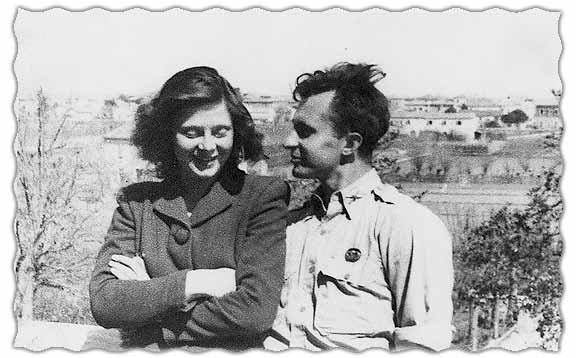
- Thiele with his wife Walkiria Terradura in 1945
- Born: 5 April 1920; Istanbul, Turkey
- Died: 15 July 1986 (aged 66); Novara, Piedmont, Italy

Formula One World Championship career
- Nationality: (United States) American or (Italy) Italian
- Active years: 1960
- Team: Scuderia Centro Sud
- Entries: 1
- Championships: 0
- Wins: 0
- Podiums: 0
- Career points: 0
- Pole positions: 0
- Fastest laps: 0
- First entry: 1960 Italian Grand Prix

Alfonso Thiele (5 April 1920 – 15 July 1986) was an Italian and American racing driver. He participated in one Formula One World Championship Grand Prix, on 4 September 1960. He scored no championship points. Most of his career was spent in sports car racing.

== World War II ==
During World War II, Thiele was a captain of the Office of Strategic Services of Italian anti-fascist partisans.

== Driving career ==
Working as a test driver for Abarth, Thiele participated in many events and races. In 1955 he was a member of the team that completed 3,743.642 km at an average speed of 155.985 km/h at the Monza track. One week later, with journalists present and participating, the team set the 500 km, 500-mile, 1,000 km, 48-hour and 72-hour records.

== Personal life ==
During World War II Thiele was a captain of the Office of Strategic Services of Italian anti-fascist partisans. There he met Walkiria Terradura, another partisan who was later awarded the Silver Medal of Military Valour. They married and briefly lived in the United States after the war, before returning to Italy.

== Complete Formula One Grand Prix results ==
(key)

Year	Entrant	Chassis	Engine	1	2	3	4	5	6	7	8	9	10	WDC	Points
1960	Scuderia Centro Sud	Cooper T51	Maserati Straight-4	ARG	MON	500	NED	BEL	FRA	GBR	POR	ITA; Ret	USA	NC	0
1961	Scuderia Sant Ambroeus	Cooper T45	Climax L4	MON	NED	BEL	FRA	GBR	GER	ITA; DNA	USA			NC	0

== Sports car results ==
Date	Race	Car	Result
1953	Mille Miglia	Fiat-1100/103	
1955	Mille Miglia	Alfa Romeo 1900	
1955	Targa Florio	Alfa Romeo 1900	
1956	Mille Miglia	Fiat Abarth 750	73rd
1956	Trofeo Sardo	Fiat-Abarth 750	32nd
1956	Coppa Lombardia	Fiat-Abarth 750	
1956	Circuito di Collemaggio	Fiat-Abarth 750	
1956	Coppa Inter-Europa	Fiat-Abarth 750	2nd
1956	GP Roma [GT750/T750]	Fiat-Abarth 750	
1957	Trofeo Vigorelli Monza	Fiat-Abarth 750	2nd
1957	Mille Miglia	Fiat-Abarth 750	63rd
1957	Coppa Inter-Europa	Fiat-Abarth 750	2nd
1957	Esso Vallelunga [GT]	Fiat-Abarth 750	9th
1958	12 Hours of Sebring	Fiat-Abarth 750	31st
1958	Targa Florio	Porsche 356A Carrera	
1958	Vallelunga [GT750]	Fiat-Abarth 750	2nd
1958	Coppa Inter-Europa	Fiat-Abarth 750	2nd
1958	Coppa Sant Ambroeus	Fiat-Abarth 750	?th
1959	12 Hours of Sebring	Fiat-Abarth 750	32nd
1959	1000km Daytona	Fiat-Abarth 750	10th
1959	Coppa Ascari	Fiat-Abarth 750	5th
1959	Coppa Sant Ambroeus	Ferrari 250 GT	4th
1959	GT GP Monza	Ferrari 250 GT	1st
1959	Linz	Ferrari 250 GT	
1959	Coppa Inter-Europa	Ferrari 250 GT	1st
1959	Coppa Inter-Europa	Fiat-Abarth 750	1st
1960	Targa Florio	Alfa Romeo Giulietta	
1960	1000 km Nürburgring	Ferrari 250 GT	
1960	6 hours Hockenheim	Fiat-Abarth 700	
1960	Coppa Inter-Europa	Alfa Romeo Giulietta	
1961	Coppa Ascari	Fiat-Abarth 1000	12th
1961	Coppa Inter-Europa	Fiat-Abarth 1000	1st
1961	Tour de France 150	Ferrari 250 GT	
1962	3 h Sebring	Fiat-Abarth 1000	4th
1962	12 h Sebring	Fiat-Abarth 850 S	10th
1962	Circuito del Garda	Fiat-Abarth 1000	
1962	Targa Florio	Alfa Romeo Giulietta	9th
1962	1000 km Nürburgring	Alfa Romeo Giulietta	
1962	1000 km Nürburgring	Alfa Romeo Giulietta	
1962	24 Hours of Le Mans	Abarth-Simca 1300	
1962	1000 km Paris	Alfa Romeo Giulietta	12th
1964	Targa Florio	Alfa Romeo Giulia TZ	4th
1964	1000 km Nürburgring	Alfa Romeo Giulia TZ	13th
