= Eugenio Curiel =

Italian physicist and resistance fighter (1912–1945)

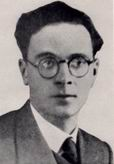
- Eugenio Curiel in 1930
- Born: 11 December 1912; Trieste, Italy
- Died: 24 February 1945 (aged 32); Milan, Italy
- Education: University of Florence and the Polytechnic University of Milan
- Known for: Physicists and famous resistance fighter

Eugenio Curiel (11 December 1912 – 24 February 1945) was an Italian physicist, a prominent figure of the Italian resistance movement. He was awarded a gold medal (posthumously) for military valour.

== Life ==
Eugenio Curiel was the first of four children of a Jewish family of comfortable circumstances. His father, Giulio Curiel, was an engineer in the San Marco workshops of Trieste, and his mother, Lucia (née Limentani), was the sister of the Florentine philosopher, Ludovico "Ludo" Limentani.

After graduation from high school in 1929, he studied engineering for two years at the University of Florence. In 1931, he enrolled at the Politecnico di Milano University, but after a few months he returned to Florence, where he took up theoretical physics and lodged with his uncle, Ludovico, who taught moral philosophy at that university. Careful to maintain his independence, he taught privately and obtained a diploma in December 1932 to teach in primary schools. In 1933, a friend, Bruno Rossi, who had obtained a chair in physics at University of Padua, invited him to finish his studies there, which he managed to do, taking his degree magna cum laude.

Curiel was, however, subject to neurasthenia, and for some time was attracted to the anthroposophy of Rudolf Steiner, whose system of thought and practical life appeared to offer, as he confided to Rossi in a letter, a stimulus towards self-discipline that might allow him to adjust his physical and psychological outlook to the intellectual and moral rigour he already displayed. His interests in this area drew him away from the scientific career which seemed to be the natural direction for him after his degree. In November 1933, he accepted a position as reserve teacher of literature at the gymnasium school of Montepulciano but returned to Padua in February 1934, where Bruno Rossi had obtained for him a position as university assistant in rational mechanics. In 1935, he joined a small clandestine communist cell at the university.

== Joining the Communist Party ==
Curiel's fascination with Steiner's philosophy diminished with time, as he gradually developed an interest in the dominant currents of idealist philosophy, in particular Kant, Fichte, Hegel, Benedetto Croce and Giovanni Gentile. At the same time, he was drawn into the study of more practical philosophical issues through a reading of the works of Georges Sorel and anarchic syndicalism. He pursued these studies at the Institute of the Philosophy of Law, where he became friends with Ettore Luccini and Enrico Opocher. But, during his sojourn in Padua at this period, a decisive event was his renewal of acquaintance with his childhood friend, Atto Braun, with whom he shared lodgings. Braun was a clandestine member of the Communist Party and through his influence, Curiel read Marx and Engels's Communist Manifesto, the Antidühring, and Lenin's What to do?. In 1935, Curiel became a member of the small communist cell at Padua University, which was led by Braun, Guido Goldschmied and Renato Mieli. He contributed articles on union issues from 1937 onwards for the magazine Il Bò, the university newspaper. It was edited both by young fascists who had begun to feel disaffected by the orthodoxy of the regime and by antifascists such as Braun.

The Communist party tried to infiltrate union and student organisations run by the fascists in order to subtly reorient them towards an attitude critical of Fascism. This was one reason behind Curiel's trip to Paris, the site of the party's foreign offices, in March 1937. He formed contacts with Emilio Sereni, Ambrogio Donini and Ruggero Grieco. To this period may be dated an article he wrote under the pseudonym of Giorgio Intelvi, entitled Our economic and union work with the masses and the struggle for democracy, which appeared in the review The Workers' State. Curiel maintained that it was necessary to pressure students, by means of university publications, to get them to abandon the still residually corporative ideology of 'left-wing fascism', and have them recognize the 'class struggle'. Persuasion of the elected representatives of factory workers was also important, in order to build among them 'clandestine groups' that would then be able to exercise a political influence on the shop floor workers. The article was subject to some criticism – Egidio Gennari took exception to its abstract character and economism – but Curiel won Gennari's confidence nonetheless, for his intelligence, culture and willpower. Encouraged, he returned to Padua to continue his work there, while maintaining his contacts in Paris.

In early 1938, Curiel was ordered by the president of the Confederation of Italian Unions, Tullio Cianetti to present himself there. Cianetti had no idea of Curiel's real political sympathies, but invited him to be more prudent, given that his articles were being cited in the antifascist press abroad. He was asked to pay attention to attempts by 'subversives' to infiltrate fascist organisations.

== Antisemitic legislation ==
Curiel's last article appeared in the August 20 edition of Il Bò. It was entitled, The union's reprisal, where he wrote that the union must 'examine closely the way collective contracts are applied' and must take into account the will of workers as that is expressed in union assemblies. To support the idea that in a corporative regime the interests of both employers and workers overlap is proof only of shows 'blindness'. In the same review, however, there was another article listing the names of Jewish teachers in Italian universities. Curiel's name naturally figured among them. The period was one that declared a turnaround in the regime's politics, which now embraced a naziphile position, In November of the same year laws for 'the defence of the (Italian) race were decreed, and, in consequence, Curiel, like so many others, was deprived of his rights to teach.

His expulsion from the university not only made earning one's way more difficult; it also made him automatically a suspect as a possible antifascist and rendered his illegal political activities more arduous. Curiel traveled to Switzerland, where, with the help of Sergio De Benedetti, he managed to make his way to the Parisian foreign office of the Communist party. There he encountered a climate of suspicion, and strong temptations to purge the group, since the Communist International had already denounced the presence of Italian agent provocateurs in the Italian branch. Eugenio Albo, who oversaw the newspaper 'The Voice of Italians' (La Voce degli Italiani) in fact would later be exposed as a spy of the OVRA. Even though no specific charges were laid against him – indeed, he was even considered as a potential editor for a newspaper that was to be published in Alexandria (the idea did not bear fruit) – Curiel passed months of great bitterness in Paris, an experience that led him, in January 1939, to take up contacts with other exponents of antifascism abroad, both socialists and members of the Justice and Liberty (Giustizia e Libertà) movement. In the homonymous newspaper of this group he wrote an article entitled Discussion of unionism and passed on to the socialist Giuseppe Faravelli a short essay he had written, The working masses and the fascist unions (Masse operaie e sindacato fascista) where he reaffirmed the necessity of using the fascist unions to undertake antifascist political work with union workers. Curiel's intention was to set up a unified front of action uniting communists, socialists, and activists of the Justice and Liberty movement, though the activists were decidedly opposed to the proposition. The socialists were divided over this prospect.

In February 1939, Curiel returned to Milan, where he lodged with his sister Grazia. In April he returned once more to Switzerland, where he discussed matters with Pietro Nenni, who was well-disposed to the idea of an accord with communists, and the possibility of organizing groups in Milan to pursue concerted action. He then attempted to enter France illegally but was stopped at the border and consigned to the Swiss police, who accompanied him back to the frontier with Italy. In Italy, in articles and letters, he continued to press for the necessity of establishing 'bonds' (with the communists' that would 'enlarge our contacts with the masses and exercise some influence on the bureaucratic tendencies of the PCI and its blind, passive discipline'. Curiel was in Trieste on the 24 June 1939 when the police identified and arrested him.

== Internment ==
Transferred to the Milanese prison of San Vittore, he revealed nothing that his interrogators did not already know. On January the 13th. 1940 a penal commission condemned him to a period of five years of internment on the island of Ventotene, where Curiel arrived on January the 26th.

Internment was less harsh than imprisonment, but those who had been interned were obliged to survive on the upkeep provided by monies their families sent them. In the difficult conditions of those years – soon after Italy entered into the war – one was often reduced to starvation rations. Several hundred detainees, mostly communists, were expedited to the island, among them Luigi Longo, Giovanni Roveda, Walter Audisio, Pietro Secchia, Umberto Terracini, Camilla Ravera, and Giuseppe Di Vittorio. Among the socialists and the actionist militants are to be counted figures like Sandro Pertini, Altiero Spinelli, Ernesto Rossi, Riccardo Bauer and Curiel's friend Eugenio Colorni, who had been arrested in September, 1938.

On 21 August 1943, following the collapse of the fascist regime, Curiel left the island to join the resistance in Milan. There he directed the daily underground newspapers L'Unità and Our Struggle (La nostra lotta), and he worked to promote the establishment of a unitary organization, the Youth Front for National Independence and Liberty (Fronte della gioventù per l'indipendenza nazionale e per la libertà) involving antifascist youths of all political orientations. It was during this phase that he sketched out his theory on 'progressive democracy', which is considered to be his most important theoretical contribution to antifascism.

On the 24 February 1945 he was recognized in the street by an informer and promptly assassinated by a squad of Black Brigades members, loyal to the Republic of Salò. In the document accompanying the posthumous award accorded to him, a gold medal for valour, he is described as an 'Ideal leader and splendid example for the youth of Italy'.

He was the cousin of Henri Curiel, a political activist in Egypt and France, and the KGB spy George Blake.

== Bibliography ==
- N. Briamonte, La vita e l'opera di Eugenio Curiel, Milano 1979
- P. de Lazzari, Eugenio Curiel, al confino e nella lotta di liberazione, Milano 1981
- Eugenio Garin, Intellettuali italiani del XX secolo, Roma 1996 ISBN 978-88-359-4151-4
