= Vintebbio =

- Frazione
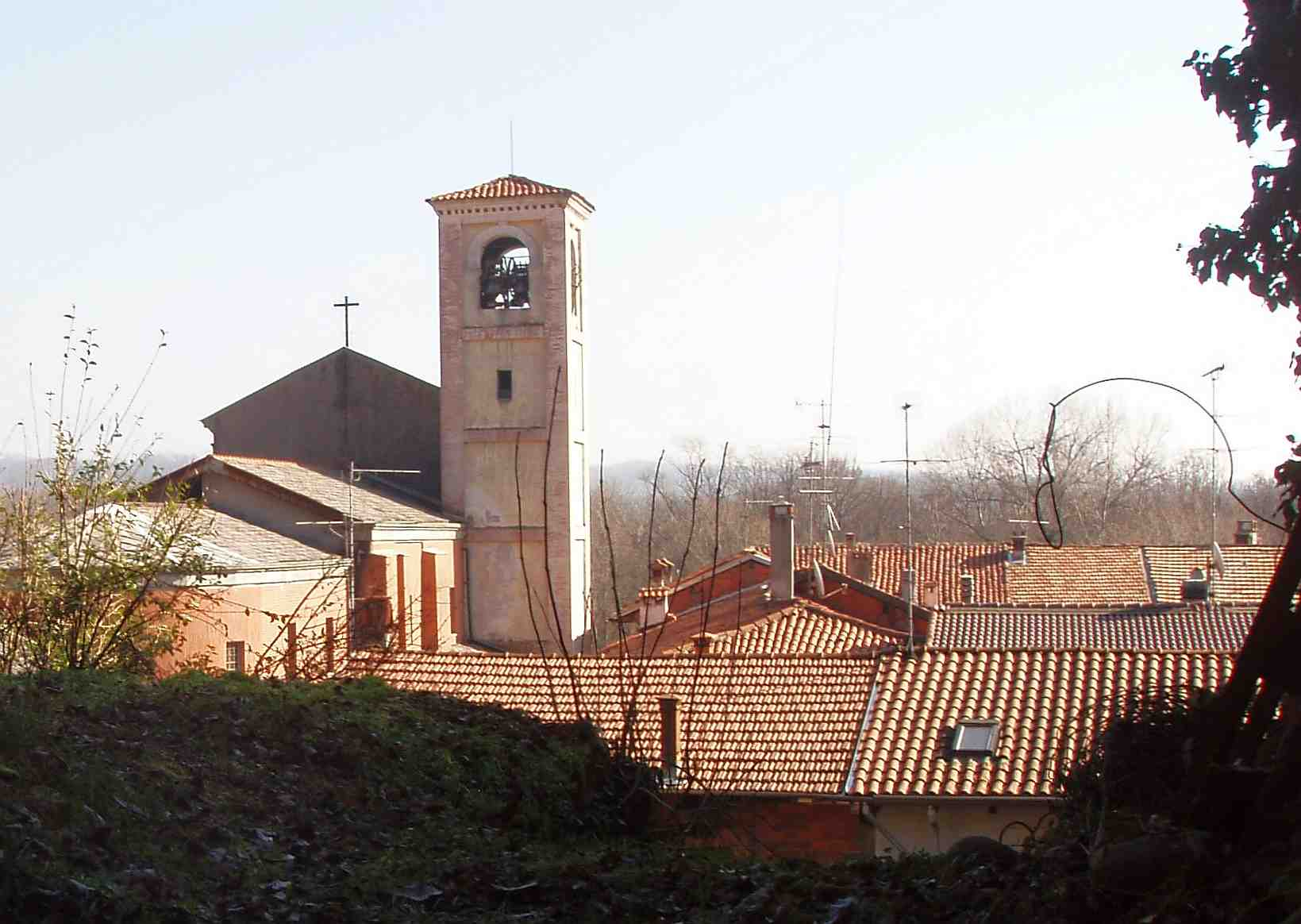

- Location of Vintebbio in Italy
- Coordinates: 45°39′59″N 8°19′55″E
- Country: Italy
- Region: Piedmont
- Province: Vercelli (VC)
- Comune: Serravalle Sesia
- Elevation: 297 m (974 ft)

Population (2001)
  - Total: 390
- Time zone: UTC+1 (CET)
  - Summer (DST): UTC+2 (CEST)
- Postal code: 13037
- Dialing code: (+39) 0163

Vintebbio is a frazione (and parish) of the municipality of Serravalle Sesia, in Piedmont, northern Italy.

== Overview ==
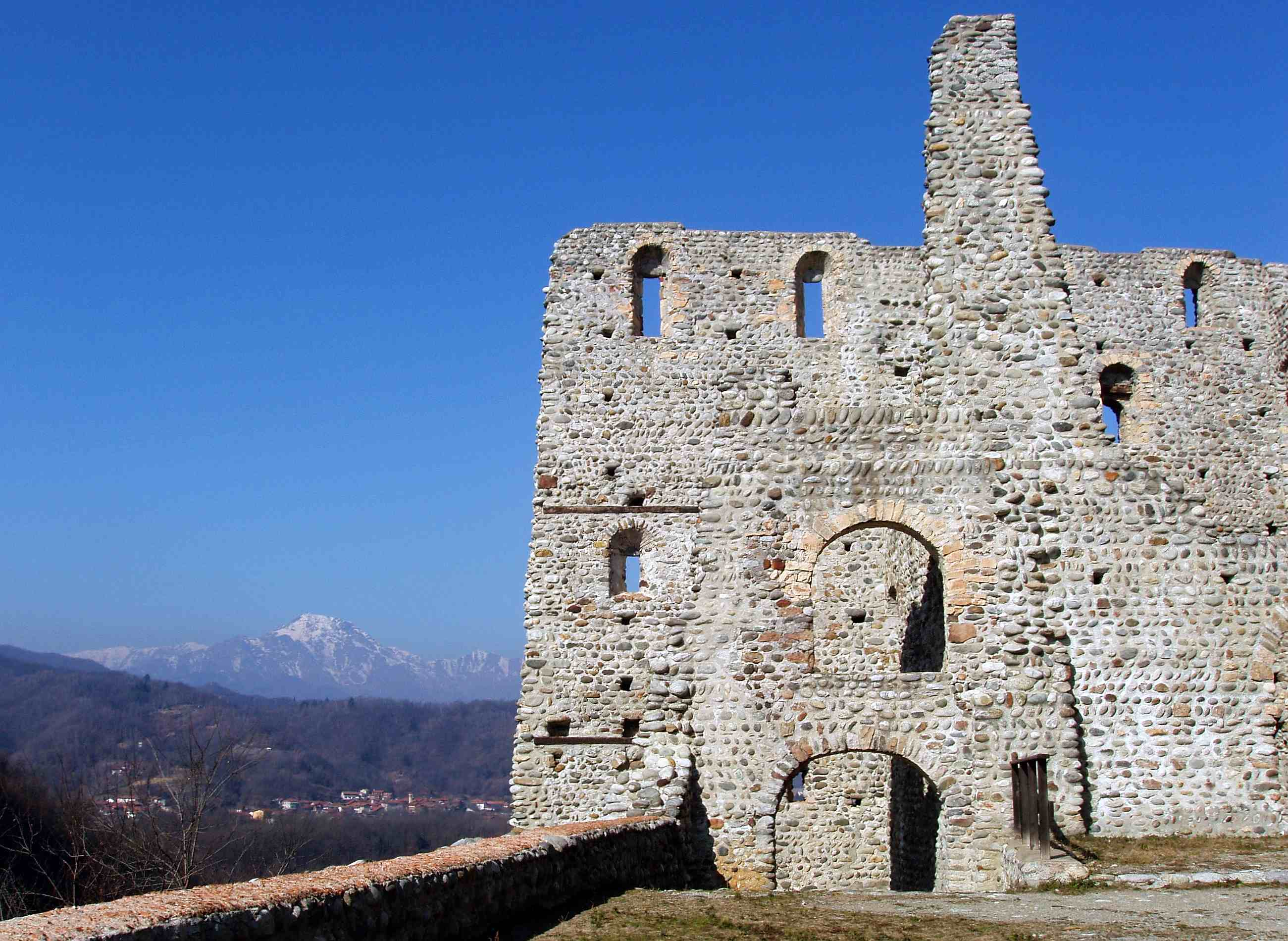
The castle with monte Barone in the background

It is a village located some km south from the centre of Serravalle, on the right side of Sesia river. Vintebbio is located at the foot of a hill where the impressive ruins of a Middle Ages castle, built by the bishops of Vercelli, overlook the village.

Until 1927 it has been a separate comune (municipality) and was then absorbed into the municipality of Serravalle Sesia.
