= Claudia Ruggerini =

Italian activist and neuropsychiatrist

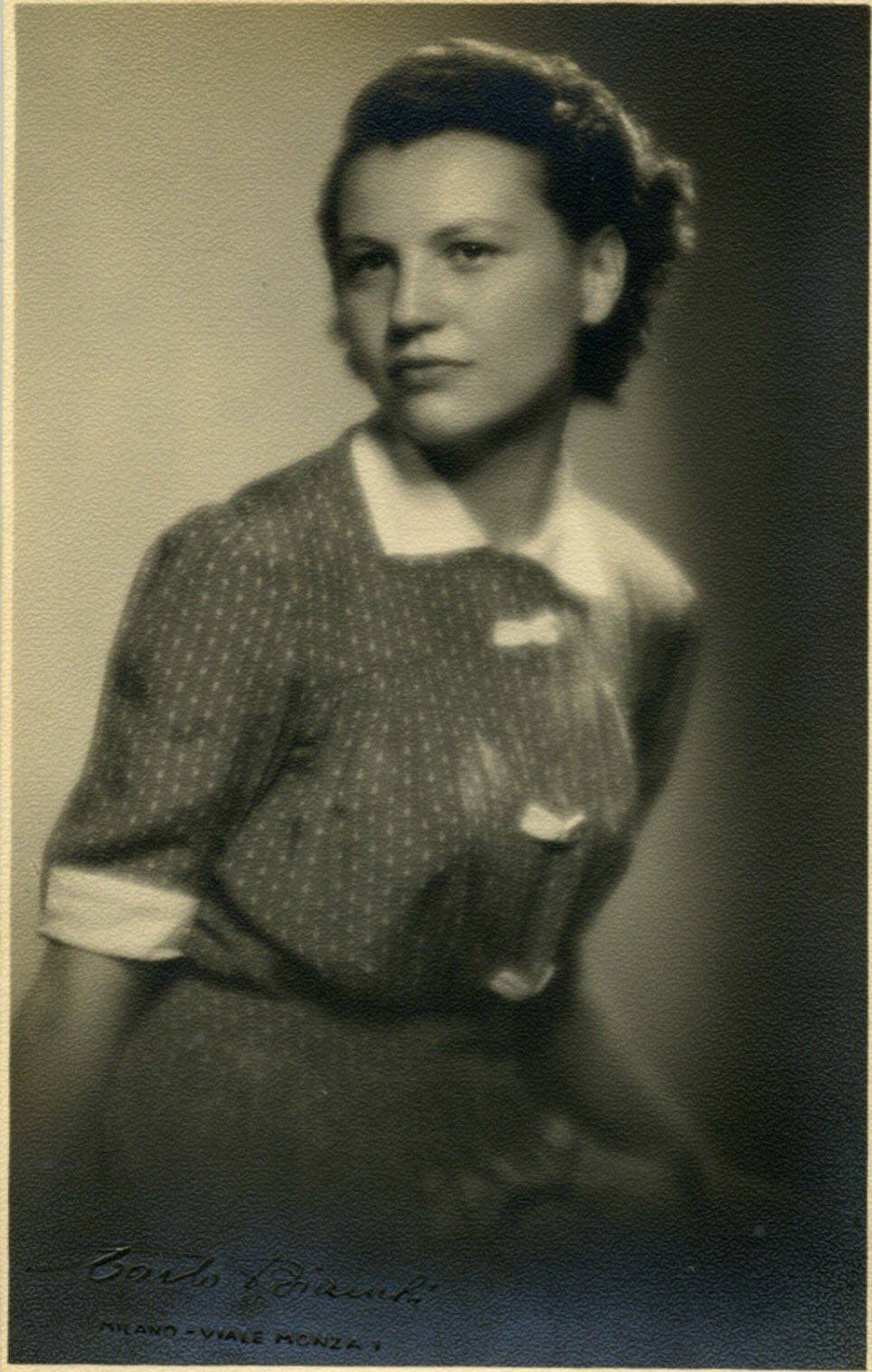
Claudia Ruggerini

Claudia Ruggerini (also known as Marisa; 1 February 1922, Milan - 4 July 2016, Rome) was an Italian partisan, activist, doctor, and neuropsychiatrist. During World War II, she joined the Italian Communist Party to overthrow the government of Benito Mussolini in July 1943.

== Early life and family ==
Claudia Ruggerini was born in 1922 in Milan, the former Kingdom of Italy. Her family was from Brianza. Her mother worked as a masseuse and later as a free trader. Her father was a part of the Italian Communist Party. He was beaten to death in 1934 by a fascist patrol in front of his house when Ruggerini was twelve years old.

Ruggerini referred to herself as "a nerd," as she was studious and had a love for the arts. In Venice, where her mother worked, Ruggerini went to churches, to the Biennale, and to see films that could not circulate in the fascist and provincial Italy.

== Education ==
Ruggerini obtained a teaching diploma in classical studies. Afterwards, Ruggerini began studying industrial chemistry at university, then switched to medicine in 1942. Upon studying medicine, Ruggerini met several anti-fascist students. When at the university, she met Hans, who was her "sweetheart" and had emigrated from Vienna because he was Jewish.

Ruggerini then joined the 107th Garibaldi Brigade, the fifth column on behalf of the Committee for National Liberation (CLN) inside San Vittore Prison, where Hans had been incarcerated. In July 1943, Ruggerini met the leader of the Neapolitan Communist Party Antonio D'Ambrosio, and alongside her peers, Ruggerini joined the anti-fascism movement. She was the only woman in the initiative committee.

== Communist Party activism ==
Ruggerini joined the clandestine Communist Party of Naples where she met artists, writers, and journalists who served as a source of training and cultural enrichment and who would later become her close friends.

Beginning in 1943, as part of the anti-fascist movement, Ruggerini distributed underground press materials, passed messages by bicycle, delivered weapons to the partisans of Valdossola, and stole anti-fascist intelligence from San Vittore Prison.

== Post-fascist regime ==
After the fascist regime ended in Italy on April 25, 1945, Ruggerini, along with journalists including Antonio D’Ambrosio, Alfonso Gatto, Elio Vittorini liberated the newspaper Il Corriere Della Sera.

"The last political mission," Ruggerini said, "I made it in '53. When we went to Picasso's Cote d'Azur with D'Ambrosio and Reale, to convince him to lend Guernica to Milan for the exhibition they were dedicating to him in the Palazzo Reale. At a certain moment, Jean Cocteau also arrived. It was a wonderful day."

Ruggerini continued her clinical schooling, concentrating on psychoanalytic treatment in children and neuropsychiatry. She completed her thesis entitled "The Technique of Psychoanalytic Treatment in Childhood" in 1949. Soon after, she met Professor Bruno Noll, who later became her husband. Afterwards, Ruggerini enrolled at the University of Pavia with a specialty in Neuropsychiatry, and she finished her course of study in 1952. She worked as a neurologist in Milan for 33 years, earning the title of Chief Neurologist at the hospital Passirana Rho in Milan.

== Later contributions and activism ==
Ruggerini believed that children with mental or neurological disorders could be integrated effectively into normal schools. In a 2016 interview, she reflected on her experiences with children during that time: "Often such children were sent to 'special schools', which only enrolled patients with neurological or mental disorders. These were not appropriate schools for children who had an educational or cultural problem!." Upon her retirement in 1987, Ruggerini was awarded the title of "Emeritus Chief of Neurology, and continued her work at the hospital as a volunteer for ten years.

In 1988, Ruggerini and Anna Mancini organized the Treviso Advar Foundation, a non-profit organization that provided at-home care for terminally ill cancer patients.

Ruggerini died from natural causes in Rome, Italy, on July 4, 2016.
