= Aldo Gastaldi =

Italian Resistance leader (1921–1945)

- Born: 17 September 1921; Genoa, Kingdom of Italy
- Died: 21 May 1945 (aged 23); Bardolino, Kingdom of Italy
- Military career
- Allegiance: Kingdom of Italy
- Branch: Royal Italian Army
- Rank: Second Lieutenant
- Nickname: Bisagno
- Conflicts: World War II; Italian Civil War
- Awards: Gold Medal of Military Valour (posthumous)

Aldo Gastaldi (17 September 1921 – 21 May 1945) was an Italian Resistance leader during World War II.

== Biography ==
Gastaldi was born in the Granarolo district of Genoa on September 17, 1921. A passionate hiker and hunter, at the age of 13 he hiked alone to the summit of Monte Antola with a 12-hour walk. In his youth he played in the rugby team of his high school and was a rower in the Società Canottieri Genovesi Elpis. After graduating from the Galileo Galilei Institute in Genoa, he worked at Ansaldo in Sestri Ponente and studied economics at the University of Genoa.

During World War II he was called up for military service at age twenty, assigned to the 15th Engineers Regiment with the rank of second lieutenant and stationed in Chiavari as a radio operator. On 25 July 1943, while on public order service with his platoon on the day of the fall of the Fascist regime, he destroyed the symbols of the Casa del Fascio in Chiavari. After the Armistice of Cassibile he hid his weapons from the Germans near the Chiavari Castle, and in the following weeks he was contacted by members of the Italian Communist Party (despite him being a Catholic), who proposed him to create a partisan group. Thus, in the winter of 1943 the first nucleus of what would become the "Cichero" Partisan Division was born in the mountains around Genoa; Gastaldi, with nom de guerre "Bisagno", became one of its leaders, leading successful raids on German and Fascist garrisons and sabotage actions on Axis fortifications. In November 1944 he managed to persuade an entire battalion of the 4th Alpine Division "Monterosa", the "Vestone", to defect to the Resistance.

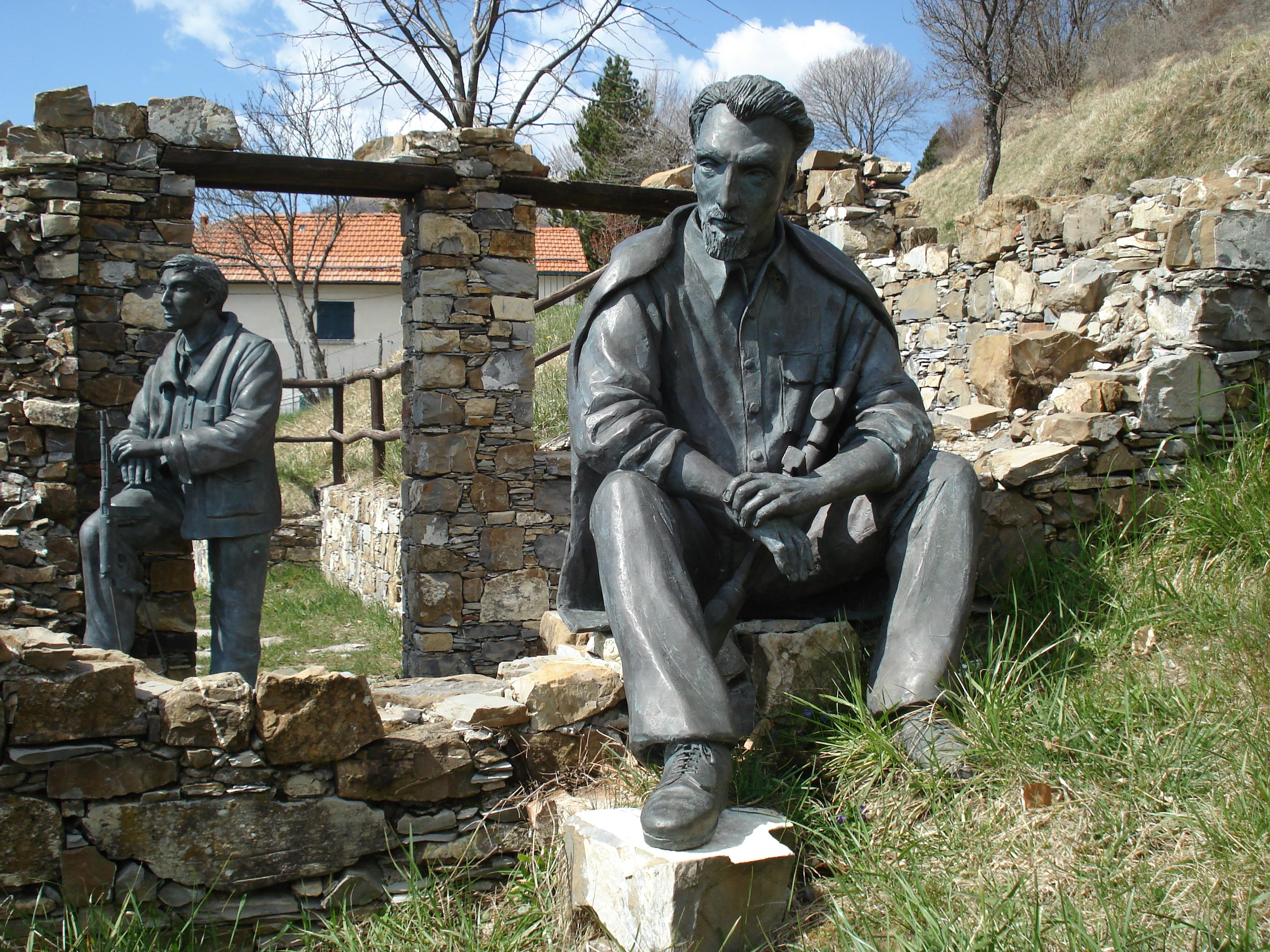
Statue of Gastaldi in Fascia, Liguria

A fervent Catholic and firmly nonpartisan, Gastaldi, together with the Communist Giovanni Serbandini, established strict rules of behavior for the men of the Division, known as the "Cichero Code", which all members swore to follow: "During actions and operations the orders of the commanders are to be followed, there will always be an assembly to discuss their conduct; the leader is elected by his companions, he is the first in the most dangerous actions, the last in receiving food and clothing, he has the most tiring guard shift; the peasant population is asked, not forced to give, and possibly paid or reciprocated for what is received; women are not bothered; no blasphemy is allowed". He always opposed the politicization of the Division and of partisan formations, which he saw as divisive and weakening the unity of the partisan struggle against the Germans and Fascists.

He died on May 21, 1945, falling from the roof of the cabin of a truck near Bardolino, on the Veronese shore of Lake Garda, while he was accompanying home some former Alpini of the "Vestone" Battalion, to keep the promise he had made to them in November 1944. He was posthumously awarded the Gold Medal of Military Valor.

In 2019 he was proclaimed a Servant of God.
