= Monte Briasco =

Mountain in Italy

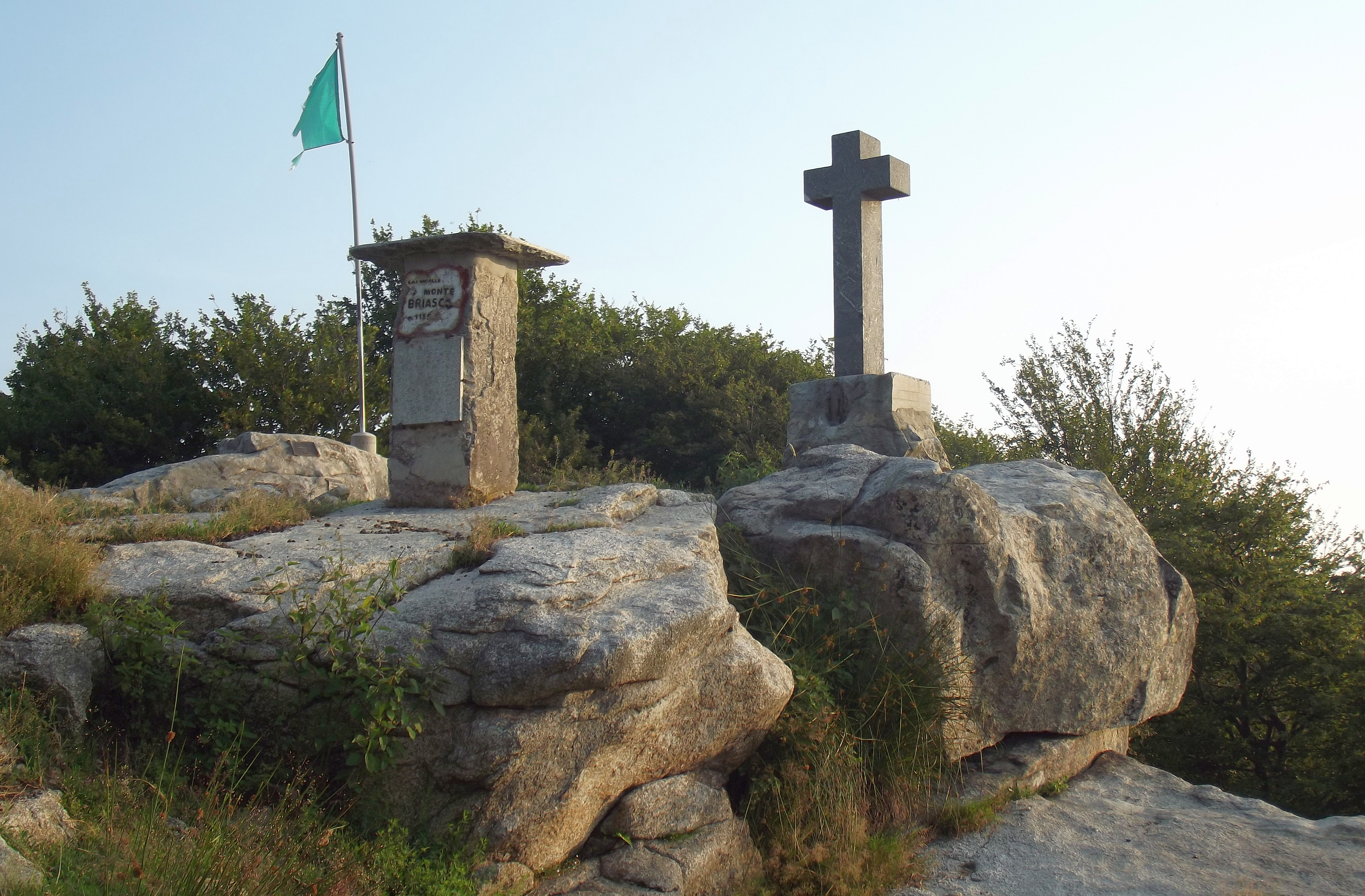
- The summit of Monte Briasco

Highest point
- Elevation: 1,185 m (3,888 ft)
- Prominence: 255 m (837 ft)
- Coordinates: 45°47′35″N 8°19′01″E

Geography
- Location within Piedmont
- Location: Piedmont, Italy
- Parent range: Alpi Cusiane

Monte Briasco is a mountain in the Alpi Cusiane, in Piedmont, northwestern Italy. It has an elevation of 1,185 metres and is located between the Valsesia and Lake Orta, at the border between the province of Vercelli and the province of Verbano-Cusio-Ossola and the municipalities of Civiasco, Varallo Sesia, Cellio con Breia and Madonna del Sasso. It is renowned for the sight on the nearby lakes and the Pennine Alps.

During the Second World War Monte Briasco was used as a base by Italian partisans.
