= Fernando Di Giulio =

Italian politician (1924–1981)

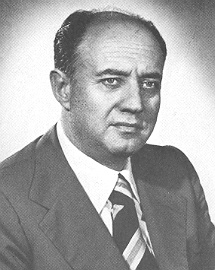

Member of the Chamber of Deputies
- In office 25 May 1972 – 28 August 1981
- Constituency: Siena–Arezzo–Grosseto

Personal details
- Born: 27 April 1924 Grosseto, Kingdom of Italy
- Died: 28 August 1981 (aged 57) Principina a Mare, Grosseto, Tuscany, Italy
- Party: Italian Communist Party
- Education: University of Pisa

Fernando Di Giulio (27 April 1924 – 28 August 1981) was an Italian politician who served as a Deputy for three legislatures from 1972 to 1981. He also served as the leader of the Italian Communist Party in the Chamber of Deputies (1979–1981).
