= Piane Sesia =

Piane
- Frazione
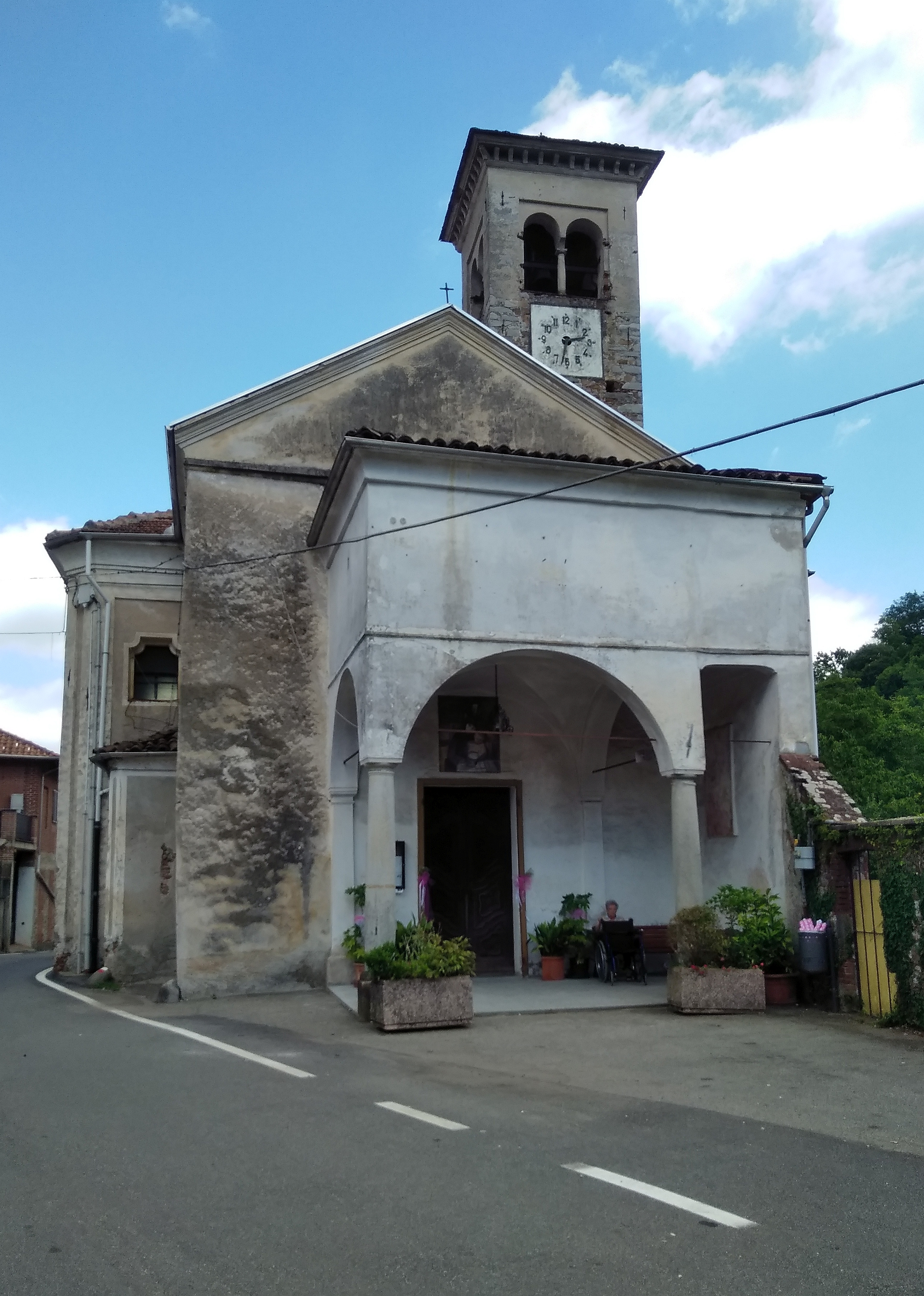

- Location of Piane in Italy
- Coordinates: 45°40′17″N 8°18′53″E
- Country: Italy
- Region: Piedmont
- Province: Vercelli (VC)
- Comune: Serravalle Sesia
- Elevation: 330 m (1,080 ft)

Population
  - Total: 400
- Time zone: UTC+1 (CET)
  - Summer (DST): UTC+2 (CEST)
- Postal code: 13037
- Dialing code: (+39) 0163

Piane is a frazione (and parish) of the municipality of Serravalle Sesia, in Piedmont, northern Italy.

== Overview ==
Piane is furthermore divided into 10 cantoni: Mazzone, Naula, Martellone, Imbricco, Quazzo, Bertola, San Giacomo, Castorino, Gattera and Sella.

Attractions include the St. Charles oratory (ca. 1650), the church of St. James (1624) the Pieve of Santa Maria di Naula, possibly built over an ancient pagan temple. The current structure was built in the 11th century and largely restored in the 19th century.

In the territory of Piane the highest point is the Pietra Groana (also spelled Croana), 699 m above the sea level. It hosts a maintained mountain refugee (now burnt in fire) and the 130-metre-tall rock wall is used a training ground by climbers.

Until 1927 it has been a separate comune (municipality) and was then absorbed into the municipality of Serravalle Sesia.
