= Pompeo Colajanni =

Italian politician (1906–1987)

Member of the Italian Chamber of Deputies
- In office 25 June 1975 – 4 July 1976
- State Undersecretary for Defense
- In office 21 June 1945 – 14 July 1946
- Member of the Sicilian Regional Assembly
- In office 20 April 1947 – 10 March 1969

Personal details
- Born: 6 January 1906 Caltanissetta, Kingdom of Italy
- Died: 8 December 1987 (aged 81) Palermo, Italy
- Party: Italian Communist Party

Military service
- Allegiance: Kingdom of Italy
- Branch/service: Royal Italian Army
- Rank: Lieutenant
- Battles/wars: World War II

Pompeo Colajanni (4 January 1906 – 8 December 1987) was an Italian politician and Resistance leader during World War II. After the war he held various political positions, including that of Undersecretary for Defense in the Parri and De Gasperi I cabinets and of member of the Italian Chamber of Deputies in 1975–1976.

== Biography ==
=== Early life ===
He was born in Caltanissetta, Sicily, in 1906, into a family of democratic and republican tradition since the Risorgimento; his grandfather Pompeo, his namesake, had founded the union against accidents for the miners of Sicily, and his great-uncle Napoleone Colajanni had been one of the founders of the Italian Republican Party. He graduated in law in the 1920s, and soon became a staunch anti-fascist and member of the then-banned Italian Communist Party; he was arrested for having worked for the establishment of an organization in which young republicans, socialists, communists and anarchists could meet and discuss their ideas. In 1940, during the Second World War, he was called up for military service and assigned to the "Cavalleggeri di Palermo" Cavalry Regiment, but was repeatedly transferred and finally sent to Piedmont for having promoted an organization of officers disappointed with the conduct of the war. When the Armistice of Cassibile was announced, on 8 September 1943, he was in Pinerolo, serving as lieutenant in the Regiment "Nizza Cavalleria" (1st), having been denied promotion to captain due to his anti-fascist past.

=== Resistance ===
Evading capture by the Germans, Colajanni, along with another fifteen men from his regiment, joined a fledgling Communist partisan group in Barge, from which the Piedmontese Garibaldi Brigades would be born; among its members were Ludovico Geymonat, Antonio Giolitti and Gian Carlo Pajetta. Colajanni's comrades who joined the partisans with him included lieutenants Carlo Cotti and Antonio Crua and second lieutenants Vincenzo Modica, Giovanni Latilla and Massimo Trani, all of whom would go on to take leading roles in the Garibaldi Brigades of Piedmont. Along with them, Colajanni founded the 1st Partisan Battalion "Carlo Pisacane"; he took the alias and nom de guerre of Nicola Barbato, after the Socialist doctor who had been a leader of the Sicilian fasci. He soon became one of the main leaders among the Communist partisans in Piedmont, becoming commander of the 4th Garibaldi Brigade of Cuneo on 14 March 1944 and of the 1st Garibaldi Division of Piedmont on 22 May 1944. After repelling a series of German and Fascist attacks in the Varaita Valley between March and July 1944, the Garibaldi groups under Colajanni maintained their combat efficiency and were partly broken into smaller groups that moved towards the plain, according to a strategy devised by "Barbato".

As the partisan ranks were swollen by new recruits, which allowed the establishment of a second Piedmontese Garibaldi division (the 11th Garibaldi Division of Piedmont), Colajanni left the command of the 1st Garibaldi Division of Piedmont to Vincenzo Modica and became the commander of the VIII Piedmontese Partisan Zone (Montferrat) and deputy commander of the Military Regional Command of Piedmont, the underground organization that coordinated all partisan groups in the region. In April 1945 "Barbato" organized the march of the partisan formations on Turin from multiple directions; the attack on the Axis-held city began on April 19, 1945, with the assault of the groups under Modica against the Fascist garrison of Chieri, which was defeated with the participation of the 11th Garibaldi Division and the Mobile Operational "Justice and Freedom" Group. On 28 April 1945 the Garibaldi partisans led by Modica and Latilla formations entered Turin, where, fighting alongside the "autonomous" partisans of Enrico Martini and the "Justice and Freedom" groups, they overcame the resistance of the Black Brigades and liberated the city. Colajanni was then appointed deputy questore of Turin.

=== Political career ===
A few months later Colajanni became Undersecretary for Defense in the Parri and, subsequently, in the first De Gasperi cabinet. He later returned to Sicily, where he became a member of the municipal council of Palermo. In 1947 he was elected regional deputy in Sicily for the People's Democratic Front; he remained in the Sicilian Regional Assembly for six terms, until he resigned in March 1969, at a time when he also held the position of vice president of the regional parliament. In 1975 he was elected to the Italian Chamber of Deputies until the following year. His political commitment lasted until his death; he was a member of the Central Committee of the Italian Communist Party, secretary of the Communist federations of Enna and Palermo, national councilor of the ANPI and of the National Peace Council. He died in Palermo in 1987, and was buried in the cemetery of Enna.
