= Serravalle Sesia =

- Comune
- Comune di Serravalle Sesia
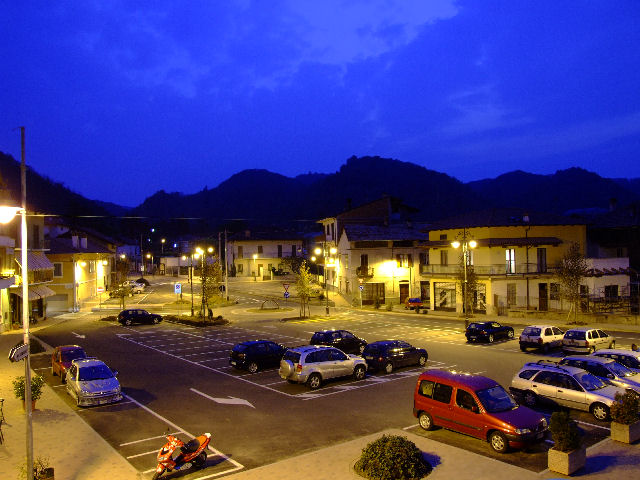
- Piazza della Libertà

- Coat of arms

- Location within Italy Location within Piedmont
- Coordinates: 45°41′N 8°19′E
- Country: Italy
- Region: Piedmont
- Province: Vercelli (VC)
- Frazioni: Bornate, Gattera, Piane Sesia, Vintebbio

Government
  - Mayor: Massimo Basso (Lega Nord)

Area
  - Total: 20.4 km^{2} (7.9 sq mi)

Population (31 December 2004)
  - Total: 5,124
  - Density: 251/km^{2} (651/sq mi)
- Demonym: Serravallesi
- Time zone: UTC+1 (CET)
  - Summer (DST): UTC+2 (CEST)
- Postal code: 13037
- Dialing code: 0163
- Website: Official website

Serravalle Sesia is a comune (municipality) in the Province of Vercelli in the Italian region Piedmont, located about 80 kilometres (50 mi) northeast of Turin and about 40 kilometres (25 mi) north of Vercelli.

The current comune was created in 1927 from the towns of Serravalle, Bornate, Piane Sesia and Vintebbio.
