= Pietro Secchia =

Italian politician (1903–1971)

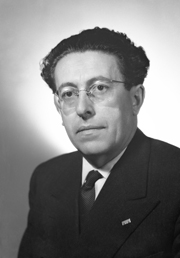
- Secchia in 1948

Member of the Senate of the Republic
- In office 8 May 1948 – 7 July 1971
- Constituency: At-large (1948–1953); Livorno (1953–1958); Biella (1958–1973)

Member of the Constituent Assembly
- In office 25 June 1946 – 31 January 1948
- Constituency: Cuneo

Personal details
- Born: 19 November 1903 Occhieppo Superiore, Kingdom of Italy
- Died: 7 July 1973 (aged 69) Rome, Italy
- Party: PSI (1919–1921); PCd'I (1921–1943); PCI (1943–1973)

Military service
- Commands: Brigate Garibaldi
- Battles/wars: Italian Civil War

Pietro Secchia (19 December 1903 – 7 July 1973) was an Italian politician, anti-fascist partisan leader and a prominent leader of the Italian Communist Party.

== Biography ==
=== Early life ===
Secchia was born into a working-class family. His father was a member of the Italian Socialist Party. In 1919, he joined the Socialist Youth Federation, where he quickly rose through its ranks after he participated in strikes and anti-fascist actions in the "Biennio Rosso". Being an active and well-known political activist, Secchia joined the Italian Communist Party (PCI) in 1921 at the time of its formation.

=== Anti-fascist resistance ===
In 1924, Secchia was elected to the Central Committee of the Communist Youth Federation, takes part in the work of the Vth Congress of the Communist International. From 1926, he was one of the leaders of the communist underground in fascist Italy. In 1928, he became a member of the Central Committee of the PCI, then a member of its Politburo. In April 1931, he was arrested and sentenced by the Special Tribunal to 18 years in prison. Until 1943, he was in prison and in exile, from where he was released by partisans. Secchia participated in the Italian resistance movement and became the general commissar of the Brigate Garibaldi brigades.

=== Post-World War II ===
In February 1948, following the VI National Congress of the PCI, he was elected Deputy Secretary General, a position he held until 1955. In 1946 he was elected as a deputy to the Constituent Assembly and in 1948 he was elected senator in the ranks of the Popular Democratic Front, remaining in the Senate until his death. Despite the party line, Secchia kept with him a group of loyal comrades from the former partisan groups who did not surrender their weapons, in case of an attempted coup d'état by the right.

Often not in line with Palmiro Togliatti's policy and sometimes considered as his possible alternative, in 1954 Secchia's position within the party began to weaken: in fact he was first joined and then replaced by Giorgio Amendola in the organizational direction. Secchia and other elements were thus progressively marginalized for their more radical stance and opposition to the "reformist" trend within the PCI. Furthermore, the death of Stalin and his denunciation of the 20th Congress of the CPSU had made the position of the components that were linked to a more organically Marxist-Leninist vision (of which Secchia was the leading exponent) particularly uncomfortable both in the party and within the broader electorate of the PCI.

Eventually, as a result of theft from the party's secret funds by one of Secchia's closest associates, he disappeared from positions of national importance. He was removed from his role in the national organization, and was instead appointed head, from 1955 to the beginning of 1957, of the Lombardy regional secretariat. He subsequently directed the party's publishing business until the end of 1962.

=== Later life ===
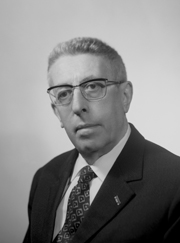
Secchia in 1968

For most of the early sixties, he was working on the study of the history of the PCI and the resistance movement, and published multiple books and memoirs.

From the end of the sixties he devoted himself to international politics. He advocated for the emancipation and independence of Africa, visiting Egypt and Syria in July–August 1967, North Africa in October–November of the same year; Jordan, and again Syria in December 1969; Sudan, Ethiopia and Somalia in October 1971. In January 1972, he traveled to Chile, where he supported the government of Salvador Allende, making him the last Western leader to visit the Latin American nation before the advent of the dictatorship of Augusto Pinochet. On his return to Italy, he suffered an illness that held him between life and death for a few months. The unusual nature of this illness led Secchia, despite having no proof, to believe that he had been poisoned by the CIA. Secchia died in July 1973.
