= Blocco Nazionale =

Blocco Nazionale is Italian for "National Bloc" and may refer to:

- National Bloc (Italy, 1921), an electoral alliance composed of Liberals, Fascists, Nationalists and Social Democrats
- National Bloc (Italy, 1948), an electoral alliance formed by the Italian Liberal Party and the Common Man's Front
- National Bloc of Freedom, an Italian political coalition of monarchist parties

== See also ==
- National Bloc (disambiguation)
