= Vercelli psychiatric hospital massacre =

Massacre in Vercelli, Italy

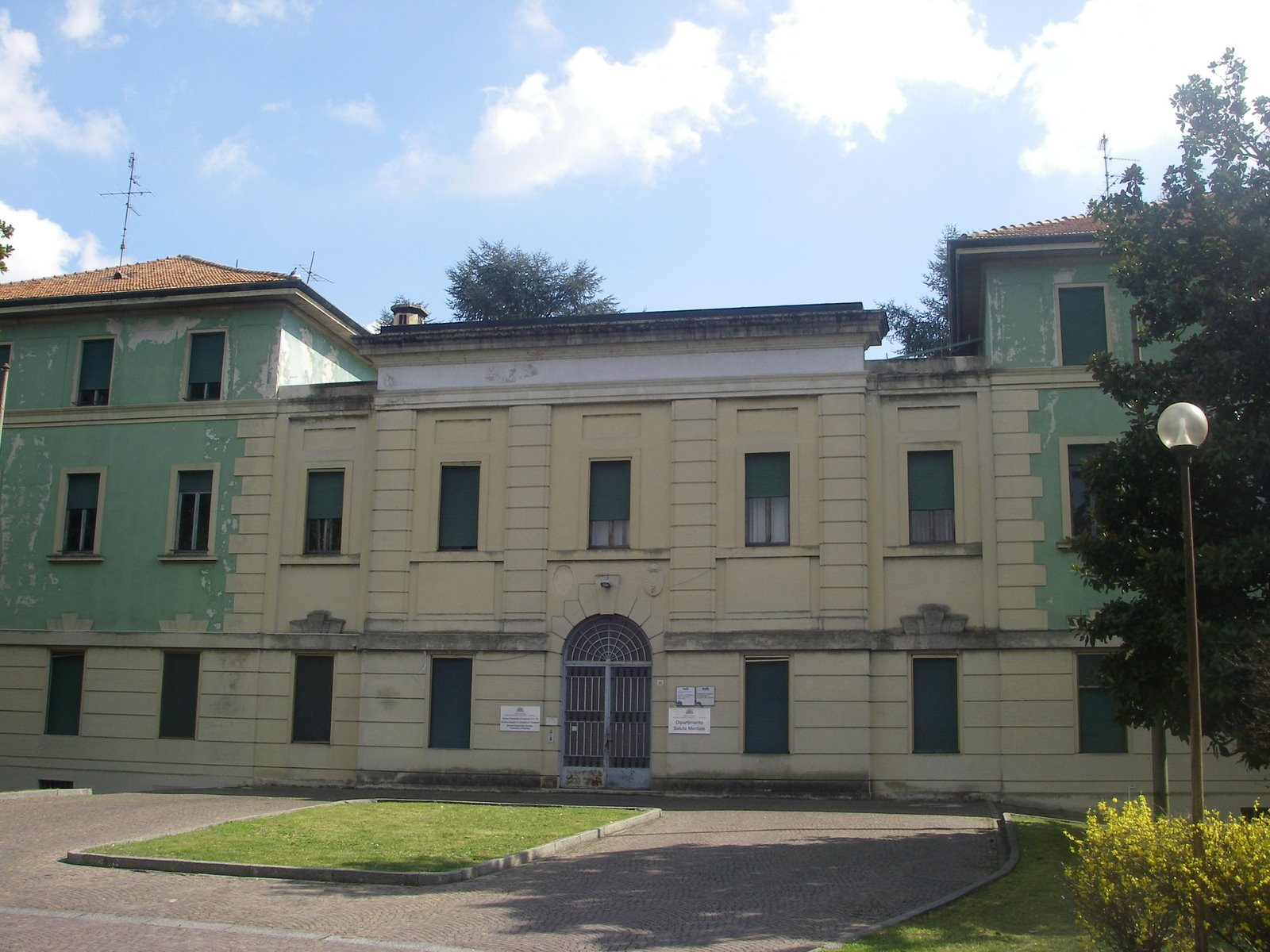
- Vercelli psychiatric hospital
- Location: 45°18′39.08″N 8°24′21.24″E; Vercelli and its province, Italy
- Date: 12–13 May 1945
- Attack type: Summary executions
- Victims: Fascist militia of the GNR and Black Brigades (51 to 65, depending on sources)
- Perpetrator: Partisans of the 182nd Garibaldi Brigade "Pietro Camana"
- Motive: Retaliation

The massacre at the Vercelli Psychiatric Hospital was the summary execution of a group of Italian Social Republic (RSI) militiamen by partisans of the 182nd Garibaldi Brigade "Pietro Camana". The massacre took place partly in the town of Vercelli and partly in the town of Greggio between 12 and 13 May 1945. The number of executed RSI members, who had been taken from a concentration camp at the Novara stadium, are estimated between 51 and 65.

The memory of the event was for decades handed down almost solely by veterans of the CSR: only in more recent years have some historians taken up the subject, which is now reconstructed sufficiently comprehensively in its general outlines, although differing in some details depending on the sources.

== Sources ==
The first historiographical treatment of the Vercelli massacre was provided by Domenico Roccia - a partisan and representative of the Action Party to the purge commission set up by the local CLN - who in his 1949 work Il Giellismo Vercellese published the names of the victims, as well as excerpts from the diary of a lieutenant of the Black Brigades "Bruno Ponzecchi" detained at the Novara Stadium.

Thereafter, for years, the subject was not covered by historians. Thus, news about the events remained reported in police, judicial and parliamentary sources, as well as in journalistic articles: some of them still dating back to the late 1940s, while others were written on the occasion of the various requests for authorization to proceed against the former partisan commanders accused of the massacre, who in the meantime had become deputies. They were also mentioned by the journalist and writer Giampaolo Pansa in his La Resistenza in Piemonte: guida bibliografica 1943-1963 published in 1965, and the journalist-historian Giorgio Pisanò, a veteran of the RSI, in Storia della guerra civile in Italia of 1972.

In 1991, historian and ex-partisan Claudio Pavone wrote about it in his A Civil War. In 1996, the Institute for the History of the Resistance and Contemporary Society of Vercelli "Cino Moscatelli" sent to print the third volume of a work by Cesare Bermani on the history of the Garibaldi Brigades in Valsesia, within which what is called "the incident of Vercelli" was reconstructed.

Giampaolo Pansa in 2003 reported the episode in a few pages of his Il sangue dei vinti, expressly citing as his sources the aforementioned Bermani and Pierangelo Pavesi, a journalist close to the reductive associations of the RSI who in 2002 had published the first edition of La Colonna Morsero. The following year, journalist and writer Raffaello Uboldi wrote about the Vercelli massacre in the essay 25 aprile 1945. I giorni dell'odio e della libertà, calling the episode the "massacre of the Vercelli Psychiatric Hospital."

== Historical context ==
=== The war of liberation in the province of Vercelli ===
In the province of Vercelli, the first partisan action in the liberation war was the attack launched on 2 December 1943 against a garrison of blackshirts in Varallo, following which the fascists reported their first casualty in the area. On 10 December a second fascist was killed, engaged with his unit in repressing a strike in Tollegno. The next day, however, the commissioner of the Republican Fascist Party in Ponzone di Trivero, Bruno Ponzecchi, was killed by partisans. These partisan actions preceded and were accompanied by general strikes by workers in the Biellese and Valsesia areas.

On 19 December, the Tagliamento Legion was flocked to Vercelli, which through the posting of notices threatened the shooting of ten hostages for every RSI soldier or German soldier killed. The threat was first implemented in Borgosesia on 22 December following the previous day's killing of two militiamen from the 63rd "M" Battalion. The Tagliamento was also guilty of massacres, fires and looting from its first days of activity in the province.

The partisan war in the Vercelli area was characterized by the presence of multiple partisan units in the area, which engaged not only in classic local guerrilla actions, but also in mountain and lowland open field combat operations, with some local successes alternating with defeats. In addition to this, the partisan forces attempted to liberate some areas of the province, coming to constitute real enclaves within the territory controlled by the republican fascists and the Germans: this is the case, for example, of the Republic of Valsesia and Valsessera, which were free between June and July 1944 and then - the latter - from March 1945. The last reprisal perpetrated by the fascists in the province took place on 9 March 1945 in Salussola with the shooting of twenty or twenty-one partisans, in response to a partisan ambush conducted on March 6 in the same locality and resulting in the death of four fascists.

==== The last month of the war in the Vercelli area ====
By mid-April 1945, the Germans and fascists had in the Biella and Vercelli areas about 4,500 men, whom the partisans were opposing in the area militarily called "Biellese" - also including Vercelli and its environs - six Garibaldi brigades, a Giustizia e Libertà brigade, a police brigade and two SAP brigades. On 18 April in Biella there were a few isolated strike actions: despite a prompt reaction from the fascist authorities in the area - led by the head of the province Michele Morsero - the next day the strike became widespread, expanding also to the Mosso Valley and Valsessera - already a free zone since the previous March - where a massive popular demonstration took place, during which partisan commanders Francesco Moranino and Cino Moscatelli spoke. The abstention from work lasted until 20 April eventually slowly resuming.

Meanwhile, on April 19, Germans and fascists had unleashed a final offensive against the partisan formations, with the aim of opening an escape route and blocking preparations for insurrection. The concentric attack, from Biella and Ivrea, involved the 75th "Maffei" Brigade, the 76th and 183rd Brigades of the 7th Garibaldi "Aosta" Division and a unit of the 182nd "Camana" Brigade. After fierce clashes, at dawn on 24 April the Germans left Biella, paralyzed by the insurrectionary strike, while the fascists remained in the city until, following lengthy negotiations with the partisan command, they were allowed to leave: a fascist column composed of the "Pontida" and "Montebello" battalions of the National Republican Guard and some units of the Black Brigades then moved in the direction of Vercelli between 2 p.m. and 4 p.m. On 25 April, Biella paid tribute to the partisans in the liberated city.

The partisan forces then decided to converge on Vercelli, passing mainly through the localities of Cavaglià and Santhià (liberated on the evening of the 25th): the first sporadic clashes on the outskirts of the capital took place that same evening. Meanwhile, in Vercelli were concentrated from various localities in the area, in addition to a garrison of 500 Germans, the remaining forces of the RSI: various divisions of the Black Brigades, soldiers of the "Monterosa" and "Littorio" divisions, grenadiers, militiamen of the "Muti" Legion and the Republican National Guard, as well as various survivors of various garrisons, for a total of about 2,500 men. Along with them, some had their own families.

On the morning of 26 April, negotiations took place between the partisan commands and Morsero: the latter proposed not to fight in the city, but the proposal was rejected to the sender with an ultimatum: capitulation of the fascists or departure from Vercelli by 3 p.m. In the afternoon, the Fascist column - comprising some 2,000 soldiers and 200 women as well as children - left the city and within the same timeframe, the German garrison in Vercelli surrendered: the city was liberated. Attacked repeatedly by partisans, the column stopped near the town of Castellazzo Novarese, surrendering on the morning of 28 April.

==== The massacre of Santhià ====
The province of Vercelli was later traversed by another strong column, consisting of German units retreating from Liguria, Turin and the Aosta Valley, which on 28 April occupied the towns of Cigliano and Tronzano Vercellese: on 29 April, it reached Borgo d'Ale, Cavaglià and Salussola, later entering Santhià in the evening. Between 29 and 30 April, the Germans attacked some farmsteads occupied by partisans, at the same time committing a series of atrocities against civilians. At the end of the fighting there were forty-eight dead: twenty-one partisans and twenty-seven civilians. The subsequent attack by the Allied air force against the German forces prompted the commander of the column, General Hans Schlemmer, to accept the proposed surrender into the hands of the Allies. The Santhià massacre is considered by some to be the trigger for the subsequent Vercelli massacre.

==== German surrender ====
The Allies arrived in Vercelli on 2 May. On the same day the German surrender in the area was signed, effective at 00:00 on 3 May. The signer of the surrender document was Colonel Hans-Georg Faulmüller, chief of staff of the German 75th Army Corps. For the Allies, Captain Patrick Amoore of the Allied mission to the partisan command in the area and U.S. Colonel John Breit were present. For the partisans, present were: Felice Mautino "Monti," Domenico Bricarello "Walter" and Primo Corbelletti "Timo," representing the Ivrea, Biella and Aosta commands; for the Ivrea CLN, engineer Giulio Borello. According to a 4 May report, 61,000 Germans and 12,000 fascists had surrendered.

== The "Morsero Column" ==
=== Establishment ===
Between 23 and 26 April 1945, the armed forces of the Italian Social Republic still in arms flocked to Vercelli from the various garrisons of the province, placing themselves under the command of provincial chief Michele Morsero. They were also joined by the "Pontida" assault battalion of the National Republican Guard (GNR) that arrived from Biella. The militiamen were also joined by civilians with their families, forming the so-called "Morsero Column" consisting of more than 2,000 people. The intention was to reach Novara and then head for the Valtellina redoubt.

The column consisted of the remnants of the following units:

- 604th GNR Provincial Command in Vercelli, commanded by Colonel Giovanni Fracassi;
- VII Black Brigade (BN) "Bruno Ponzecchi" from Vercelli;
- XXXVI BN "Mussolini" from Lucca;
- CXV "Montebello" battalion;
- I grenadier battalion "Ruggine";
- I assault battalion "Ruggine";
- I rock-climbing battalion "Ruggine";
- III assault battalion "Pontida."

The column set out around 3 p.m. on 26 April 1945, under the command of Morsero and GNR Colonel Fracassi. As it left the city, it was subjected to heavy rifle fire near the bridge over the Sesia River, which was answered in a disorderly manner. For the rest of the day the column moved smoothly in the direction of Novara to Biandrate, where it was engaged in a new exchange of rifle fire with partisans. Early in the morning, after spending the night on the march, the column reached Castellazzo Novarese.

=== The surrender ===
The column arrived in Castellazzo Novarese on the morning of 27 April and was quartered there in the local castle, which the partisans of the 82nd "Osella" Brigade surrounded and attacked several times, losing two men in the fighting. It was then decided to send some officers to meet with the partisans to discuss a free transit to Oleggio, where the Ticino would be crossed. Negotiations were set to begin at 12 p.m. Having established a truce at the suggestion of lawyer Leoni, frantic negotiations were then begun in the course of which the partisans demanded the surrender of the column.

In order to evaluate the partisan demand, at 4:00 p.m. the commands of the column convened a council of war, which met in the Sala della Consulta at the town hall, in which in addition to Prefect Morsero all the highest ranking officers participated. The partisan delegates were admitted to the council hall and proposed to escort a delegation of republican officers to Novara, so that they would verify the surrender of the city garrison and meet with representatives of the National Liberation Committee. They then went to Novara Captain Angelo Nessi (of the "Ruggine") and Captain Paolo Pasqualini (of the "Pontida"), who, having returned to Castellazzo Novarese, communicated the proposals of the CLN: surrender with the honor of arms, the right for officers to keep their service weapon, and safe-conducts for the troops authorizing their return to their families or to the desired location.

Morsero and Colonel Fracassi finally decided to accept the surrender conditions, challenged, however, by the officers, who did not trust the partisans and were convinced they could hold out until the Allies arrived. The same surrender conditions were accepted in the same hours by a nearby German garrison. On the following day, April 28, the surrender of the column to partisan forces and the handing over of weapons, many of which were previously rendered unserviceable, took place. Prefect Morsero was picked up by the partisans and transferred to Vercelli, where he was imprisoned. The prisoners, separated from the women and children, were instead taken to Novara and locked up by the partisans in the Viale Alcarotti stadium, in those days used as a concentration camp. During the transfer, despite the terms of the surrender even the officers were deprived of their weapons, which had been kept up to that point.

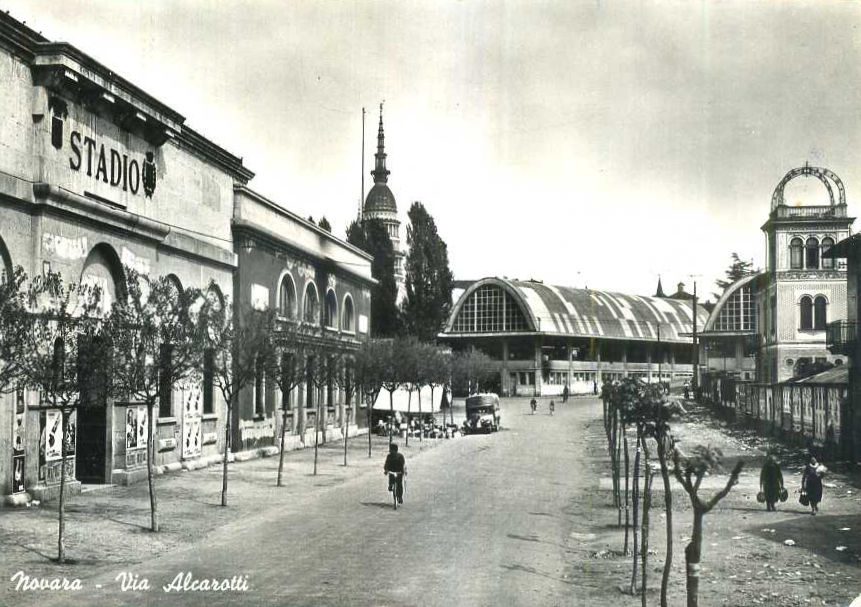
The entrance to the Novara Stadium on Alcarotti Street. In the center, the market.

A total of 1,500/1,800 prisoners were concentrated inside the Novara stadium, living under improvised tents within sight of the covered market on the opposite side, which had become a sort of gallery where citizens and onlookers gathered to make hostile comments. Hygienic conditions became increasingly precarious, and immediately the round-ups began: every day a few fascist officers were taken away for interrogation, and some of them were summarily tried and executed.

=== SAF women ===
That evening the women of the Female Auxiliary Service, about three hundred of them, were separated from the other soldiers and taken to the "Negroni" kindergarten and the "Ferrandi" school; later they were taken to the "Tamburini" barracks. Several sources say that Monsignor Leone Ossola, apostolic administrator of the Novara diocese, intervened in their defense. According to the reports of historian Anna Lisa Carlotti, Silvio Bertoldi, Luciano Garibaldi and Pavesi - who reports on the point the testimony of Ossola's assistant, Don Carlo Brugo - the partisans allegedly decided to make the auxiliaries parade naked through the streets of the city, but this did not happen because of the cleric's opposition. They were later transferred to the prison camp in Scandicci, on the outskirts of Florence.

== The massacre ==
=== The first withdrawals of prisoners from the Novara camp and first killings ===
From the Novara stadium, several groups of prisoners were on several occasions taken by partisans and transported to other facilities; the largest takeover ended with the massacre at the psychiatric hospital.

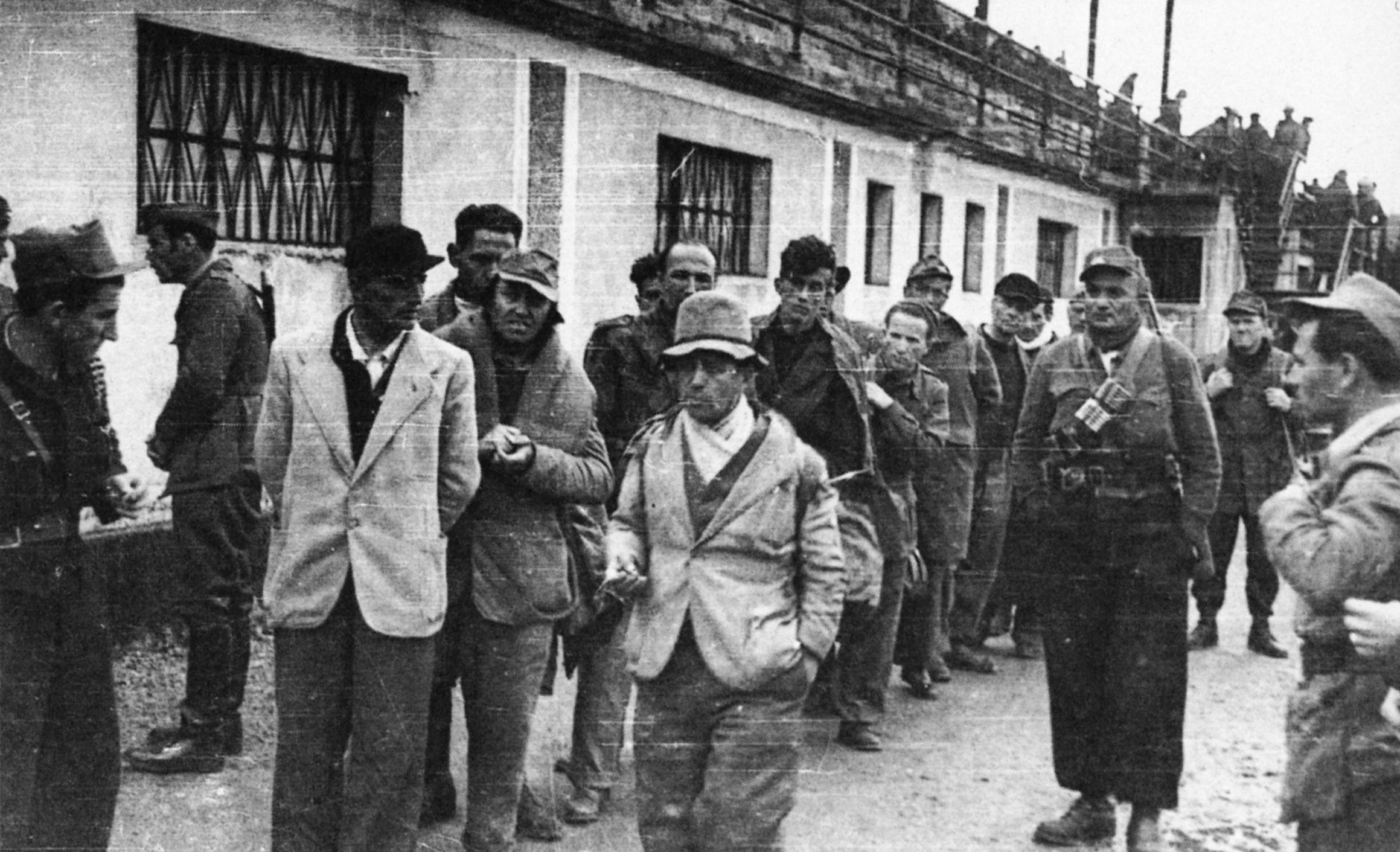
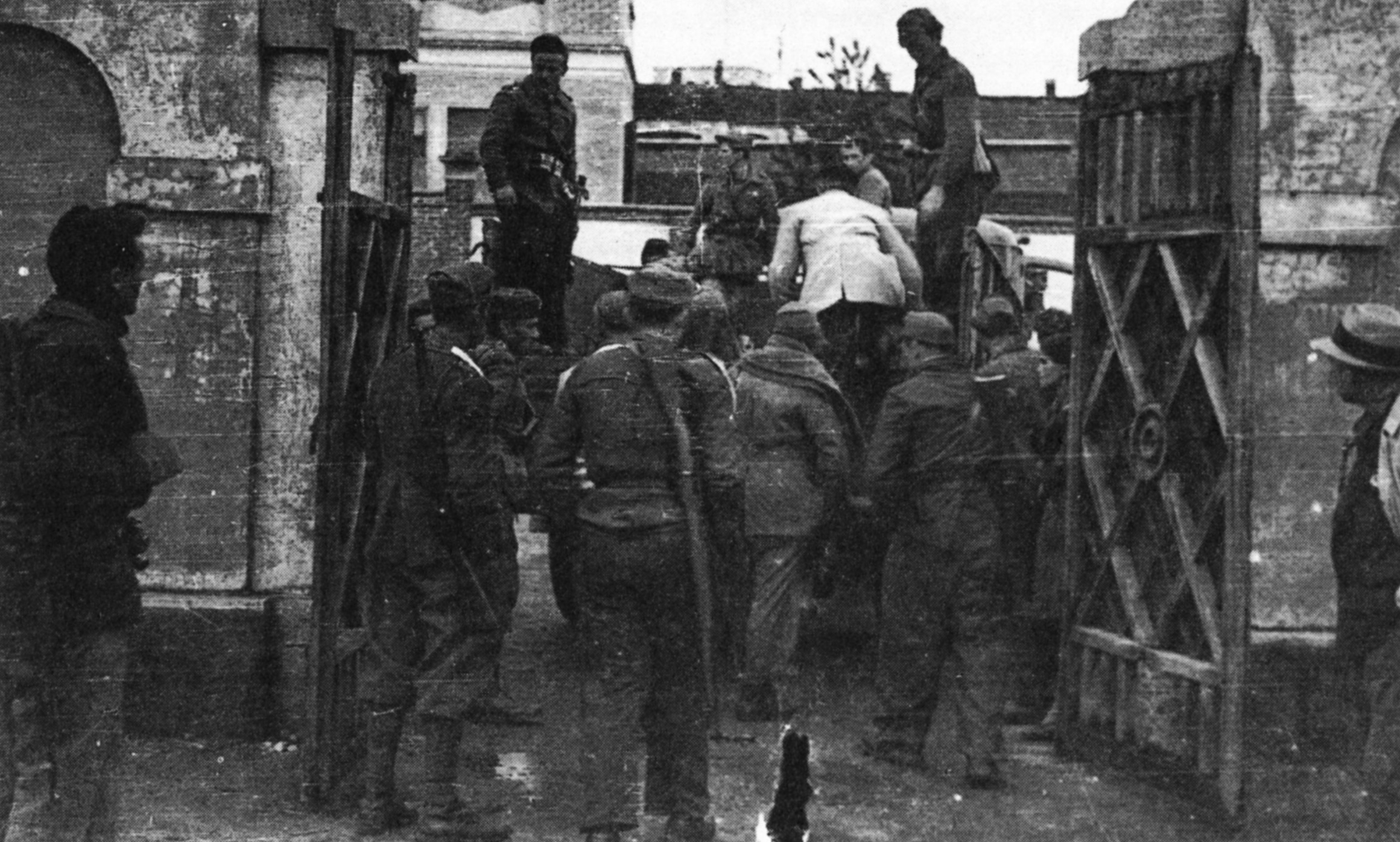
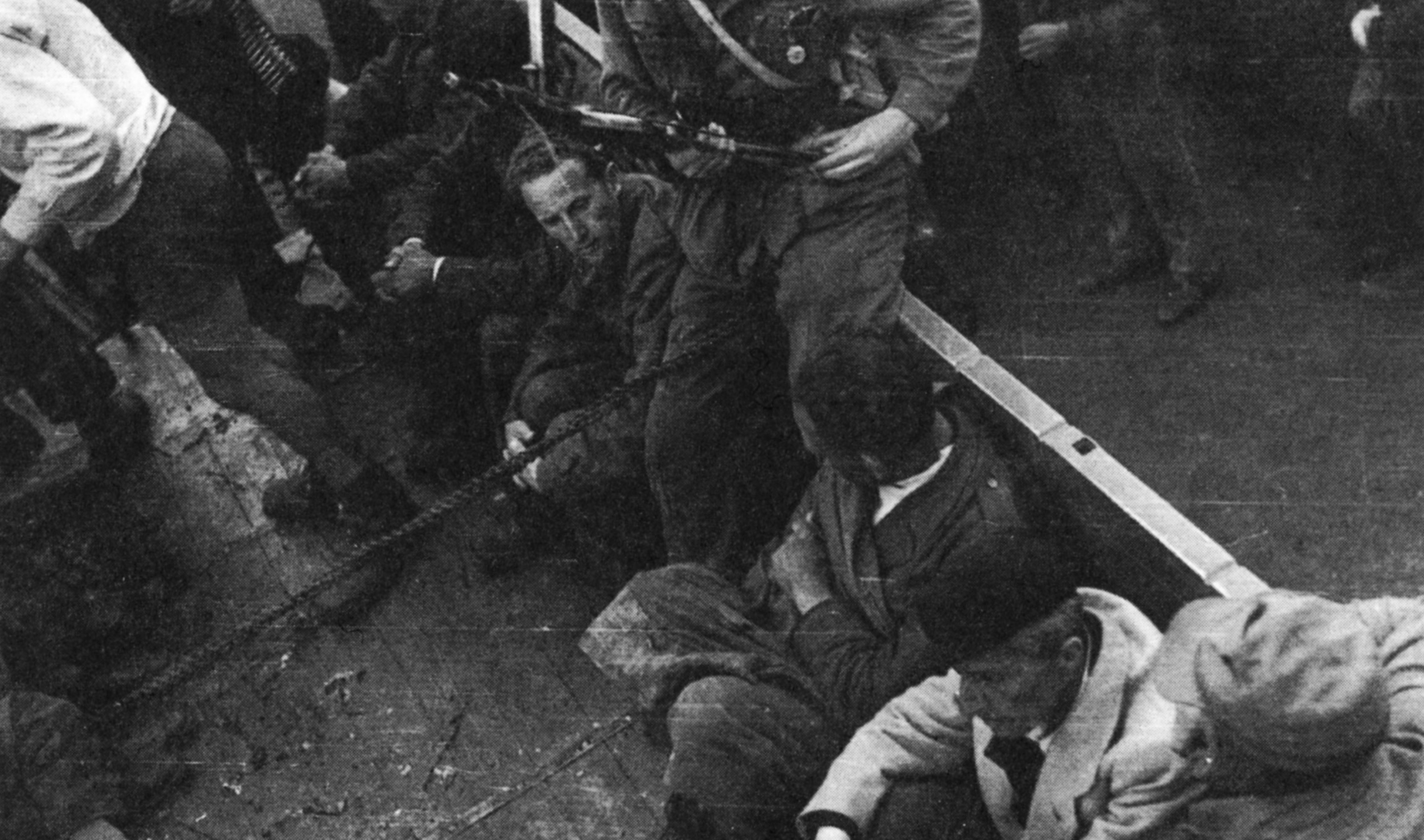
Taking of prisoners from the Novara camp. The pictures depict the 3 May 1945 round-ups: all those picked up were to be shot the same day. In a white jacket can be recognized the political secretary of the PFR of Biella Antonio Giraudi.

On 1 May, the most prominent figures of the fallen fascist regime, such as former Vercelli federal and commander of the "Bruno Ponzecchi" Black Brigade Gaspare Bertozzi, and Colonel Fracassi were taken: they were all beaten and wounded. The same evening Fracassi was picked up again, this time by American agents who transferred him to the Coltano concentration camp. Later - as reported in the diary of a lieutenant of the Black Brigade "Bruno Ponzecchi" edited by Domenico Roccia - about forty officers of the Vercelli Military Command were filed in, taken from the Novara camp and transported to Vercelli at the "Conte di Torino" barracks. Once inside they were beaten and locked up in the building's detention rooms, while the partisans confiscated all their property and belongings. Some were maimed or died as a result of the violence, others were transferred and later executed, while the survivors on 13 May were transported to Coltano.

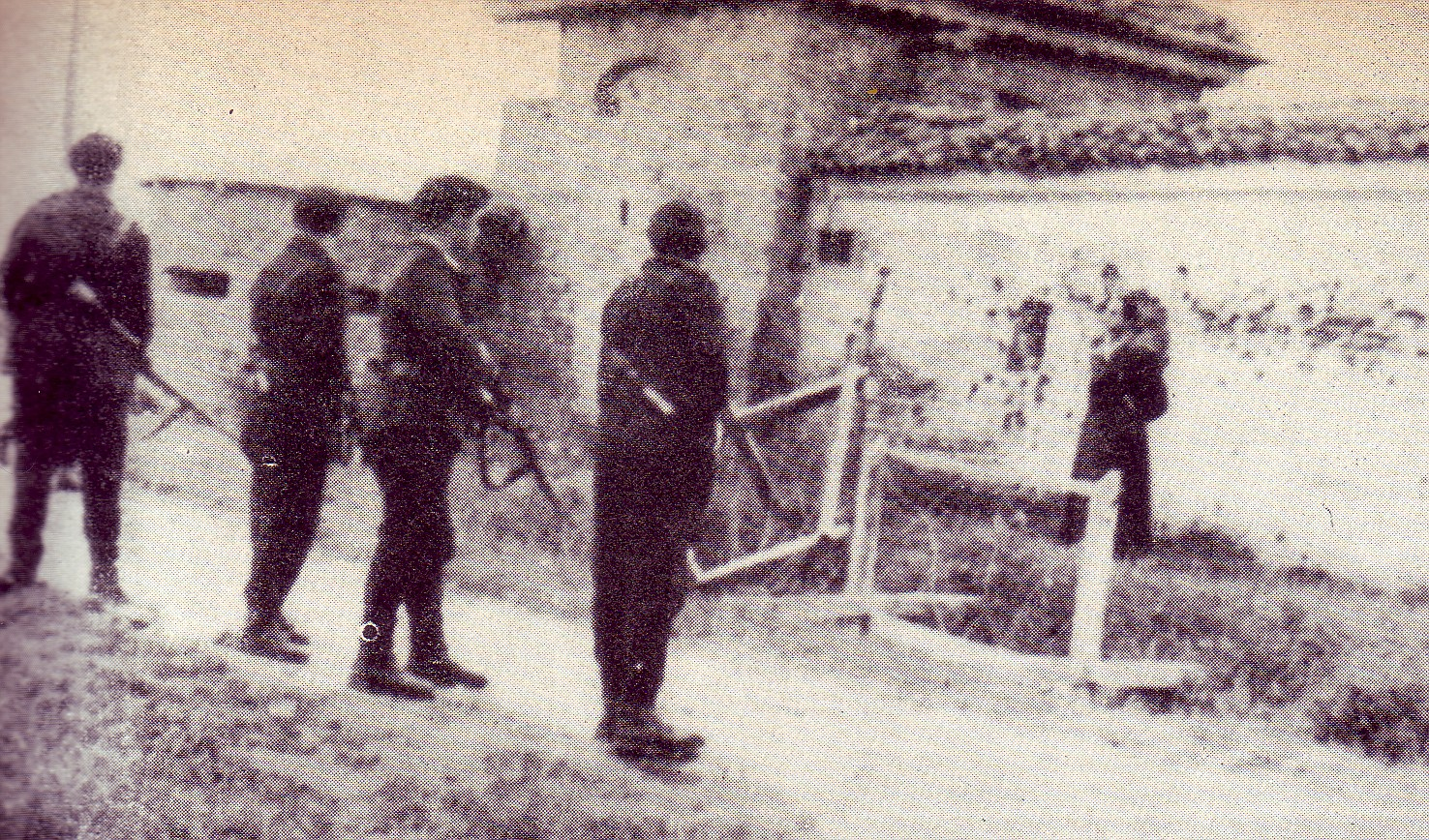
Head of the province of Vercelli Michele Morsero in front of the firing squad, 2 May 1945

Also on 1 May, Michele Morsero, who had previously been imprisoned in Vercelli, was taken to Novara to be tried by a war tribunal, which, however, declared itself incompetent and sent him back. He was then brought before the war tribunal in Vercelli on 2 May, where at about 12:30 p.m. he was sentenced to death, being shot shortly thereafter outside the city's Billiemme cemetery along with five other fascists including the city's podestà Angelo Mazzucco.

On 3 May, twelve fascist soldiers were taken from the Novara stadium with a forged order from the Partisan Grouping Command, then shot and thrown into the Cavour Canal. On the same day the Allied Military Government of Occupied Territories headed by U.S. Captain Fred De Angelis was installed in Novara. On 8 May, more bodies of fascist soldiers were fished out of the Quintino Sella Canal, a branch of the Cavour Canal.

Meanwhile, the first Allied troops began to flow into Novara, and on 13 May they also began to garrison the stadium, taking over from the partisans in the surveillance of prisoners. Between 16 and 18 May, the prisoners from Novara were picked up by the Allies, who used fourteen trucks for transport: nine left from the stadium, five from the Tamburini barracks. The men were transported mainly to Bologna and from there sorted to various places, including Coltano, while the women (loaded on two trucks) were taken to Milan, at the disposal of the Fifth Army for clearing rubble and other work.

=== The transfer to the psychiatric hospital and summary executions ===
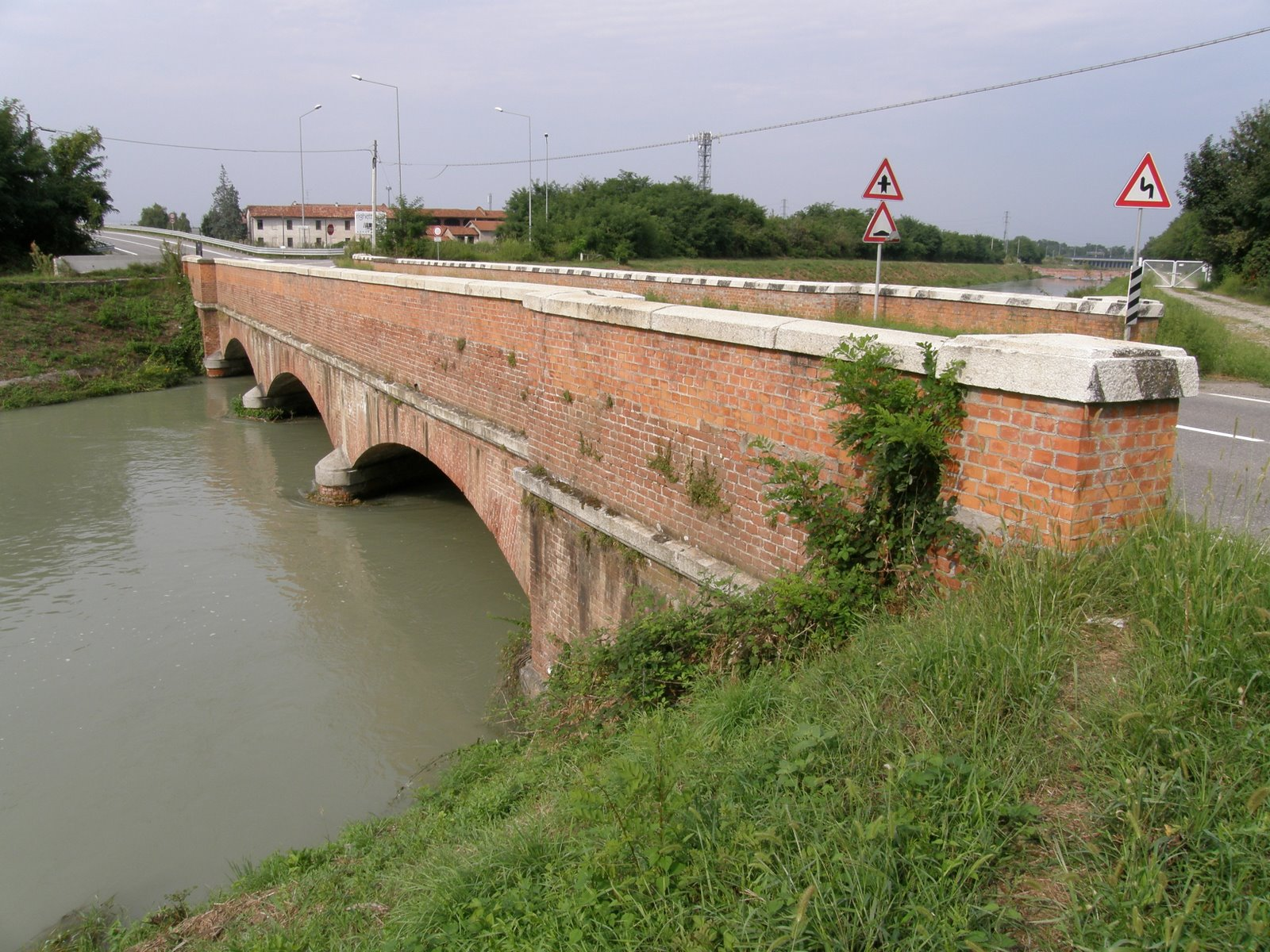
The bridge of Greggio

On 12 May, a group of partisans from the 182nd Garibaldi Brigade "Pietro Camana" left for Novara in a bus and a truck, equipped with a list of 170 names of fascist prisoners to be picked up. Arriving on the spot, they called by roll call the fascists on the list: they identified a total of 75, loaded them onto the vehicles and took them to Vercelli, locking them up inside the local psychiatric hospital after forcing the hospital staff out. There they were violently beaten and divided into groups. Between the afternoon of 12 May and the early hours of 13 May, the majority of the prisoners were executed, as follows:

- Eleven were transported to the nearby hamlet of Larizzate, shot and summarily buried in an anti-aircraft defense trench.
- According to the Turin prosecutor's reconstruction, close to ten prisoners were bound with wire, laid on the ground in the hospital square and crushed under the wheels of two trucks, used "like two steam rollers." Cesare Bermani reconstructs the specific episode dubiously: the prisoners "would have been tied with iron wire, laid on the ground and crushed under the wheels of two trucks." For Uboldi, on the other hand, twenty prisoners were "slaughtered" inside the psychiatric hospital and later "the bodies [were] brought to the square in front of the hospital and a truck [passed] over them repeatedly [...]." The bodies of these prisoners were never found.
- Other prisoners were reportedly defenestrated or killed at random, always on the premises or in the hospital garden.

The bulk of the prisoners were taken to Greggio, a town in the province of Vercelli, and were killed in the middle of the night on the Cavour Canal bridge at the headlights of two trucks. The number of victims reported by sources varied from a minimum of 20 to a maximum of 50. Their bodies were thrown into the water: some were found only after several days and in some cases several kilometers downstream from the place where they were killed.

According to the Turin Prosecutor's Office, a dozen prisoners were transported from the Vercelli psychiatric hospital to the local judicial prison, later contributing to the reconstruction of the events with their testimony.

=== The victims ===
The exact number of victims is unknown. The Vercelli Police Headquarters indicated fifty-one by name, but the Turin Public Prosecutor's Office in 1949 hypothesized that it was "legitimate" to believe that their number "considerably exceeds" this figure, taking into account "that in the waters of the Cavour canal, at the Veveri locks, about fifty corpses were fished out in the second half of 1945 [. ..]; that of the 75 picked up in Novara little more than a dozen had their lives saved; that other fascist soldiers captured outside the Novara concentration camp died on the same night of May 12." The issue has been addressed in recent times only by associations of veterans of the Italian Social Republic or by authors from related political areas: the number in such cases rises to about sixty-five victims.

The fifty-one names given by the Vercelli police headquarters are as follows:

Name	Surname	Place of birth	Date of birth	Unit	Rank
Antonino	Amodio	Taranto	7 June 1914	Black Brigades	Lieutenant
Pietro	Ballabio	Sant'Ambrogio Olona (VA)	6 November 1917	GNR	Brigadier
Casimiro	Battaglia	Montagnana (MO)	24 July 1906	GNR	Soldier
Alessandro	Biagioni	Castelnuovo di Garfagnana (LU)	ND	GNR	Brigadier
Luigi	Biagioni	Potenza	ND	GNR	Soldier
Giovanni	Cappio Barazzone	Croce Mosso (VC)	16 August 1901	GNR	Soldier
Costantino	Castaldi	Graglia (VC)	ND	GNR	Soldier (former traffic policeman)
Nicola	Cesare	ND	ND	ND	ND
Giuseppe	Coggiola	Trino (VC)	January 12, 1899	GNR	Soldier
Mario	Dagna	Rivarolo Ligure	1913	GNR	Major
Luigi	Del Vecchio	Terlizzi (BA)	23 September 1928	Black Brigades	Member of a Fascist squad
Giustino	Fangini	ND	1908	GNR	Soldier
Alberto	Ferrari	Biella	21 May 1921	Black Brigades	Member of a Fascist squad
Danilo	Ferro	Oderzo (TV)	1917	GNR	Lieutenant
Renato	Gallo	Valle San Nicolao (BI)	ND	GNR	Soldier
Giulio	Ghezzi	Ussita (MC)	28 April 1923	GNR	Second Lieutenant
Domenico	Giunta	PortoMajor (FE)	31 May 1912	Black Brigades	Marshal
Giuseppe	Goldin	Vercelli	1926	GNR	Soldier
Pietro	Graglietto	Salussola (BI)	23 March 1891	Black Brigades	Marshal
Bruno	Laione	Biella	5 May 1920	GNR	Brigadier
Domenico	Lorenzoni	Rieti	1909	GNR	Captain
Marcello	Maddetti	ND	ND	GNR	Soldier
Ennio	Marchi	Vezzano sul Crostolo (RE)	18 December 1897	Black Brigades	Captain
Raffaello	Morescalchi	Viareggio (LU)	ND	GNR	Major
Costanzo	Marola	Vercelli	10 August 1905	GNR	Adjutant
Gino	Mati	Castelnuovo Val di Cecina (PI)	24 April 1899	GNR	Major
Alfredo	Mazzocchi	ND	ND	ND	ND
Vittorio	Melkar	ND	ND	GNR	Soldier
Walter	Mezzedini	ND	ND	GNR	Soldier
Giovanni	Milano	ND	ND	GNR	Soldier
Alberto	Perfetti	Rovito (CS)	20 August 1901	GNR	Lieutenant Colonel
Emilio	Petrini (o Petrucci)	ND	ND	GNR	Soldier
Giovanni	Picco	ND	ND	GNR	Soldier
Pietro	Polisano	Napoli	August 30, 1898	GNR	Adjutant
Giovanni	Profumo	ND	ND	GNR	Soldier
Olimpio	Ramella	Biella	December 18, 1885	GNR	Soldier
Dario (detto Leo)	Raviglione	Zimone (VC)	27 January 1920	GNR	Lieutenant
Paolo	Rebucci	Modena	1 January 1925	GNR	Second Lieutenant
Antonio	Scarabello	ND	ND	ND	ND
Giuseppe	Scarantino	Caltanissetta	1929	GNR	Soldier
Aldo	Secchi	Induno Olona (VA)	13 November 1926	GNR	Second Lieutenant
Mario	Serralunga	Valdengo (BI)	1902	Black Brigades	Member of a Fascist squad
Luca	Signorelli	San Martino in Rio (RE)	March 28, 1892	GNR	Major
Livio	Stefanucci	Fabrica di Roma	15 August 1900	GNR	Captain
Giovanni Battista	Terrile	Genova	28 June 1907	GNR	Adjutant
Giovanni	Testa	Camagna Monferrato (AL)	1900	GNR	Captain
Adolfo	Valfrè	Mombercelli (AT)	ND	GNR	Lieutenant Colonel
Giovanni	Vicari	Langhirano (PR)	25 November 1899	GNR	Major
Fiorello	Vivi	ND	ND	GNR	Soldier
Alfredo	Zannoni	Greve in Chianti (FI)	24 July 1924	GNR	Second Lieutenant
Pietro	Zanotti	ND	ND	GNR	Soldier

== Alleged perpetrators, prosecution and political controversy ==
Despite the fact that investigations into the case had begun since 1946, the judicial proceedings for the killing of the Vercelli prisoners never reached the trial stage: as a result, there is no conviction for the 12–13 May massacre.

On 24 June 1949, Ciaccia, the prosecutor general of the Court of Turin, sent to the president of the Chamber of Deputies, Gronchi, through Minister of Grace and Justice Grassi, a request for authorization to proceed to trial against Deputies Moranino and Ortona, both from the Italian Communist Party, in connection with the massacre. The crime alleged was that of continued aggravated murder. The indictment made express reference to a "mass slaughter" carried out "with cruelty" of "51 Fascist militiamen" who "having surrendered to the forces of the Resistance [...] had definitively ceased to constitute an obstacle or hindrance to the conclusion of the struggle against fascism."

According to the prosecutor's accusatory hypothesis, the massacre was to be attributed to elements of the 182nd Garibaldi Brigade under the orders of Giulio Casolaro (commander) and Giovanni Baltaro (political commissar), while the instigators would have been two partisan leaders known by the conventional names of "Lungo" (Silvio Ortona) and "Gemisto" (Francesco Moranino), respectively in the Biella and Vercelli area commands. The total number of defendants amounted to twenty-seven in the state.

Silvio Ortona in a photo from 1947

Also according to the Turin Public Prosecutor's Office, Ortona in the course of the investigation allegedly "explicitly admitted to having given on behalf of the Biella zone command the order to take and kill the prisoners," while "Moranino is referred to by his chief of staff Attila (Colombo Remo), as the one who in his capacity as commander of the Vercelli square wrote and signed with the aforementioned Attila and the deputy commander "Spartano" the order to hand over the same prisoners to the forces of the 182nd Garibaldi Brigade."

Prior to the application for authorization to proceed, there had been discussion of the judicial proceedings opened against the perpetrators of the Vercelli massacre during the session of the Chamber of Deputies on 25 February 1949. The discussion focused almost exclusively on the very recent case of the mild conviction of Junio Valerio Borghese, which had allowed the former commander of the Tenth MAS to be immediately released from prison, triggering reactions from many deputies. On that occasion, Luigi Longo (PCI) asserted that the dead of Vercelli were allegedly "fascist raiders, torturers and bandits," and that their killing would be justified by "insurrectional directives," which provided for saving the lives only of those among the Nazi-fascists who surrendered "if they were not personally guilty of serious crimes against the national liberation movement."

In particular, Longo accused the Fascists killed in Vercelli of having "carried out massacres, destruction of farmsteads and monuments," specifically citing the murder of three people in Occhieppo having crushed "their victims against the wall with the bumper of their cars." the execution of the entire Command of the 76th Garibaldi Brigade; the killing of the priests of Torrazzo (mistakenly called "Porrazzo" by Longo) and Sala Biellese; participation in the massacre of Santhià on 29/30 April 1945; the massacre of several partisans in Salussola, Buronzo and Biella and along the Milan-Turin highway. "The execution of all of them," Longo concluded, "was in accordance with the directives of the General Command." However, subsequent historiographical studies brought to light that, among the crimes reported by Longo, the Santhià massacre, the killing of the command of the 76th Garibaldi Brigade, and the Buronzo (or Garella) massacre had been perpetrated by German troops. In addition to this, the 15 November 1944 murder of Don Francesco Cabrio in Torrazzo was the work of "Littorio" Division second lieutenant Gian Francesco del Corto, who was not included among the victims of the Vercelli massacre. Finally, the parish priest of Sala Biellese - Don Tabarolo - was reported to have died as a result of a grenade blast during a battle between Nazi-Fascists and partisans on 1 February 1945. On the other hand, the Salussola massacre (8 and 9 March 1945), in which twenty to twenty-one partisans were shot, was immediately attributed to the CXV "Montebello" battalion of the GNR, whose remains were actually part of the Morsero column.

On 16 May 1950, the Turin prosecutor, Andriano, sent to the presidency of the Chamber of Deputies, through the Minister of Grace and Justice, Piccioni, a supplement to the previous request for authorization to proceed, requesting the arrest of the deputies "to avoid any exceptions that could compromise and hinder the normal course of the investigation." The House, however, did not discuss the request for authorization to proceed, which consequently lapsed in 1953, at the end of the 1st legislature.

With the start of the 2nd legislature, on 17 August 1953, Turin Attorney General Nigro forwarded, through Minister of Grace and Justice Azara, a new application for authorization to proceed and for the arrest of the two deputies. Nigro supplemented the application on 12 November 1954, revoking the request for arrest as a result of the amnesty that had intervened in the meantime in December 1953. On 8 July 1957, the Trial Authorization Board expressed by a majority vote a favorable opinion on the authorization to proceed to trial, "no element having surfaced, on the basis of which one can speak of political persecution" against Ortona and Moranino. The request, however, was not discussed in the courtroom by the end of the legislature. For the same type of offenses and in relation to the same fact, on 11 July 1957, Trombi, the Prosecutor General of Turin, presented to the Chamber of Deputies, through Minister of Grace and Justice Gonella, a further request for authorization to proceed against Communist deputy Giovanni Baltaro, believed by the prosecution to be "a co-conspirator of Moranino and Ortona." This application does not appear to have been discussed either in the junta for authorization to proceed or in the courtroom.

Finally, on 9 May 1961, Judge Giuseppe Ottello, president of the Investigating Chamber of the Court of Appeals of Turin, acquitted the defendants involved "due to the political nature of the crime" and issued a ruling that Francesco Moranino, who was still a fugitive at the time, was not to be prosecuted, albeit only for insufficient evidence, thus revoking the arrest warrant issued against him. The court had occasion to emphasize how there were, highlighted by the trial results, "serious doubts about Moranino's responsibility from the point of view of a determination to the crime, which was certainly carried out by others."

According to press reports on the occasion of Silvio Ortona's death (March 6, 2005), the former partisan commander was "one of the rare persons capable of assuming political responsibility for an event, the Opn massacre of which, in truth, he was neither a direct nor indirect witness."

== Remembrance ==
Two monuments were erected in memory of the fallen: a memorial by the bridge over the Cavour Canal in Greggio, and a granite memorial stone on the clearing in front of the Vercelli Psychiatric Hospital. Both monuments bear the same epitaph; the Vercelli memorial stele also bears a dedication to the fallen soldiers.

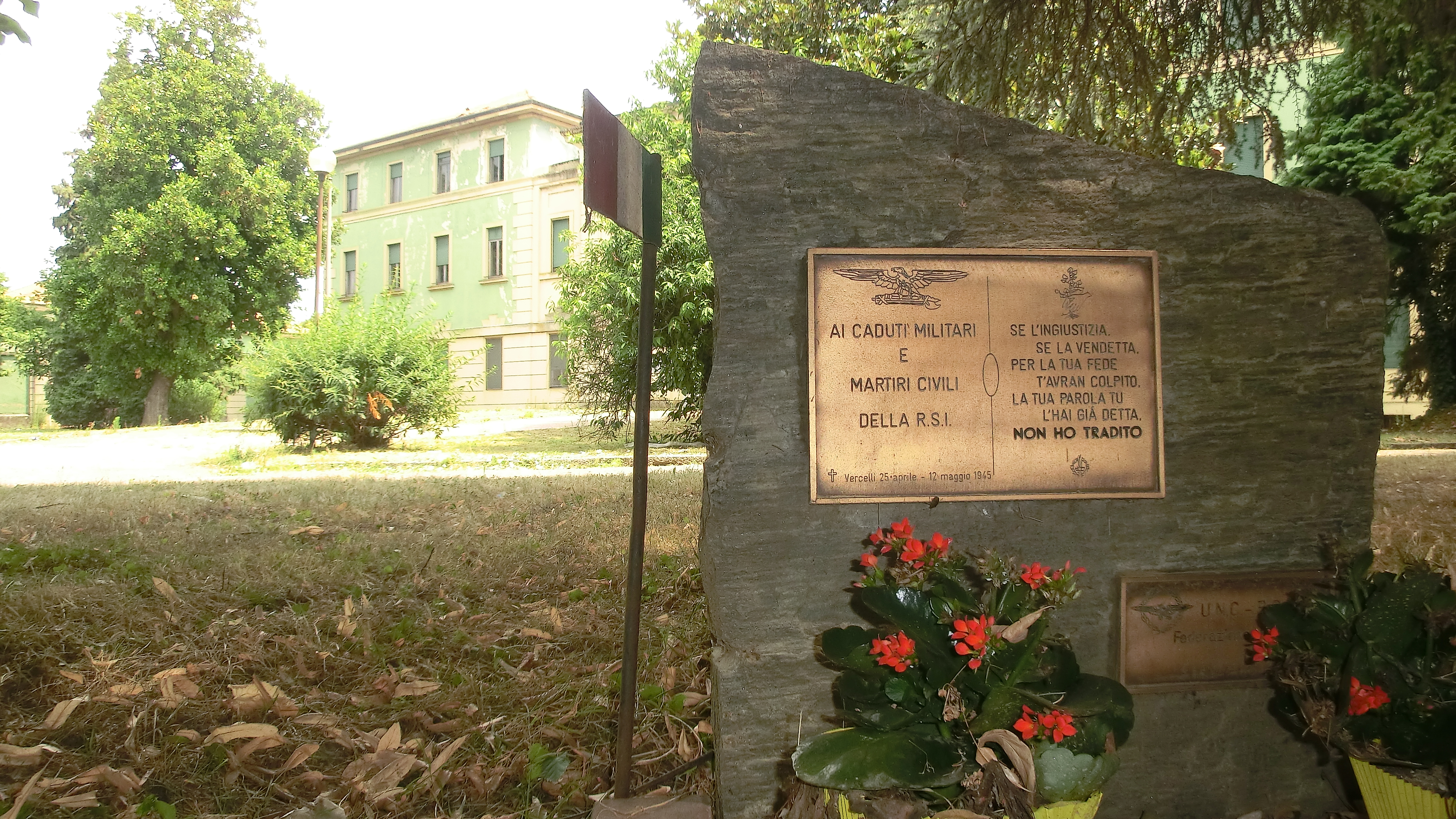
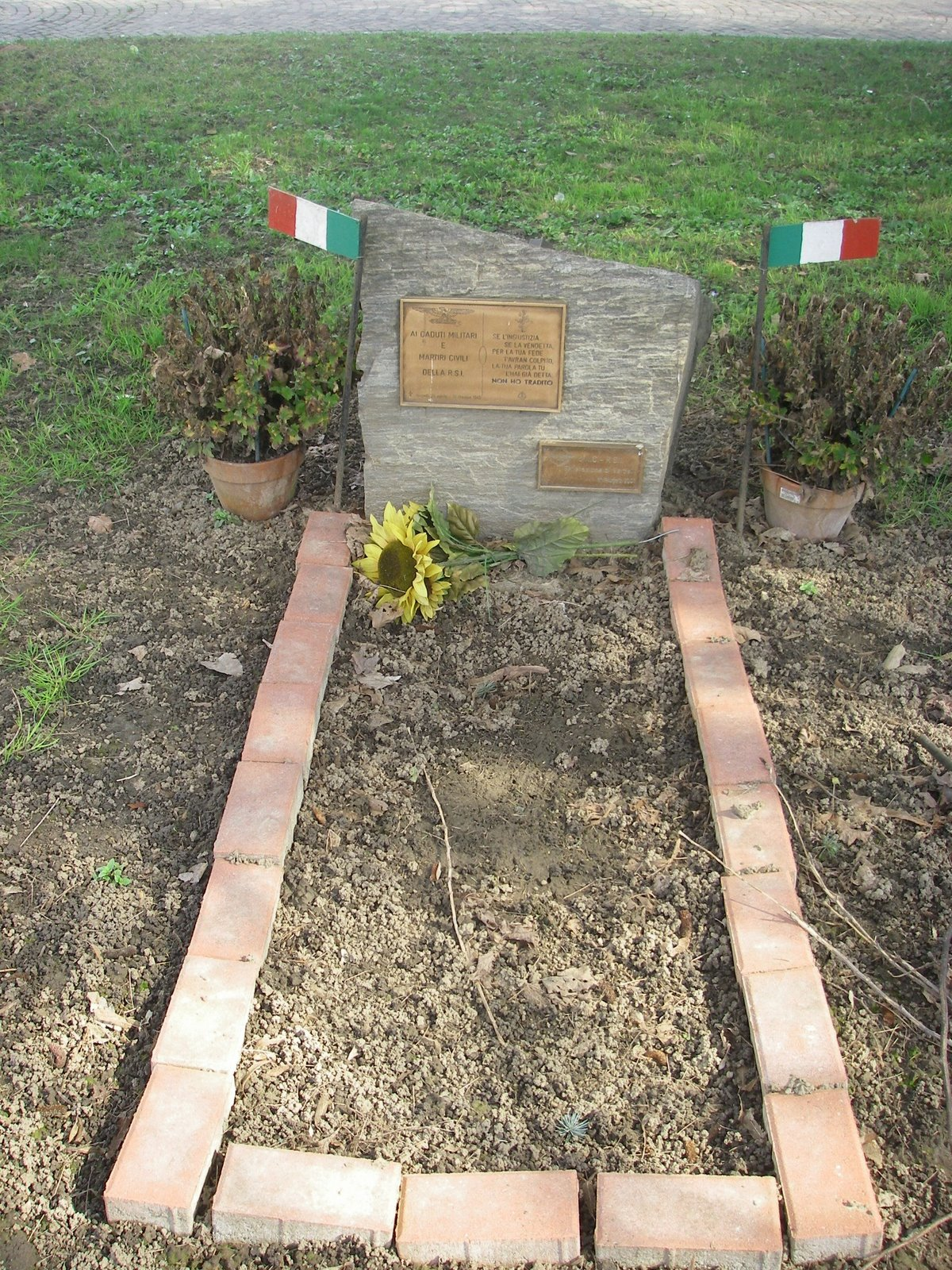
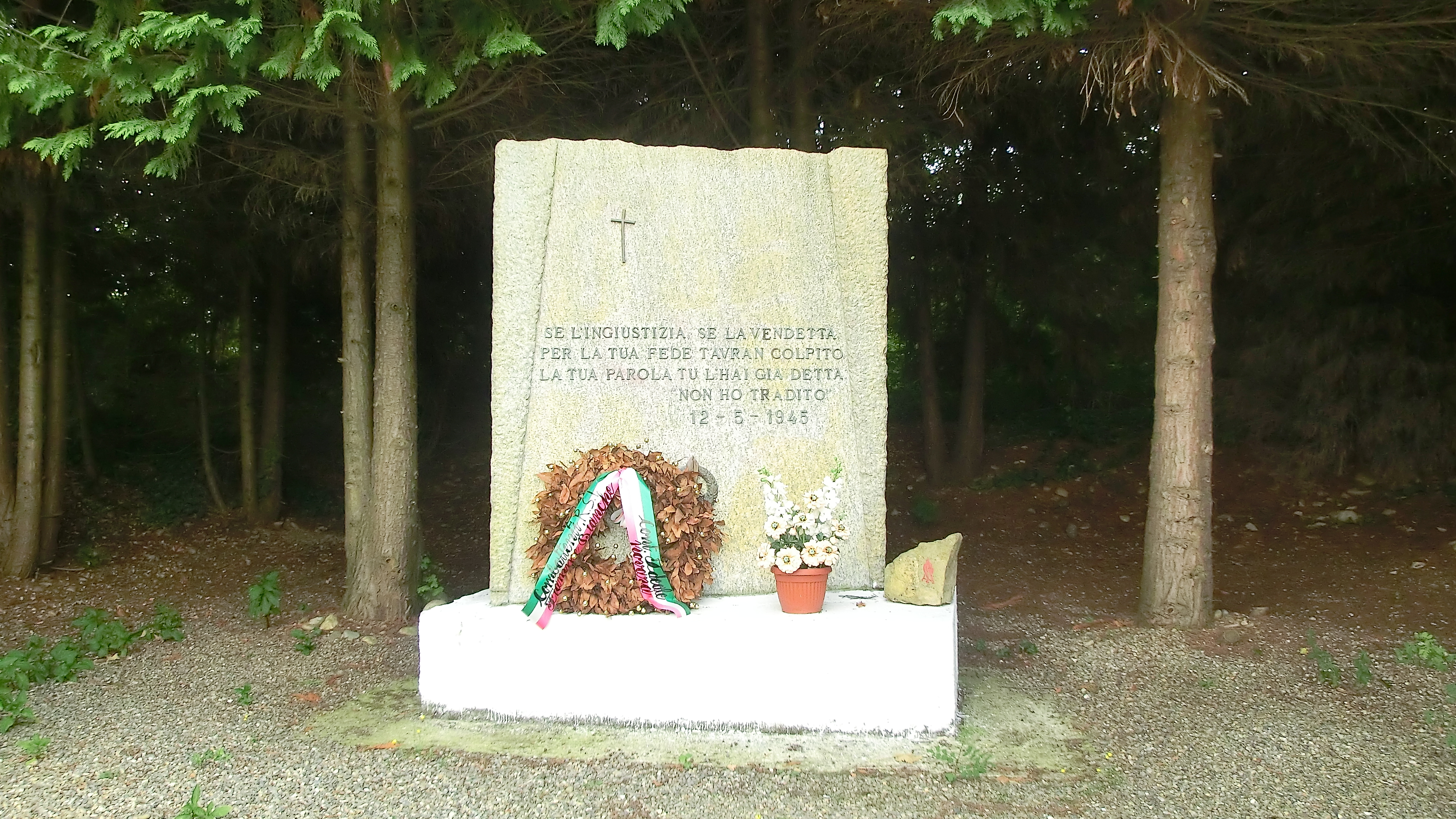
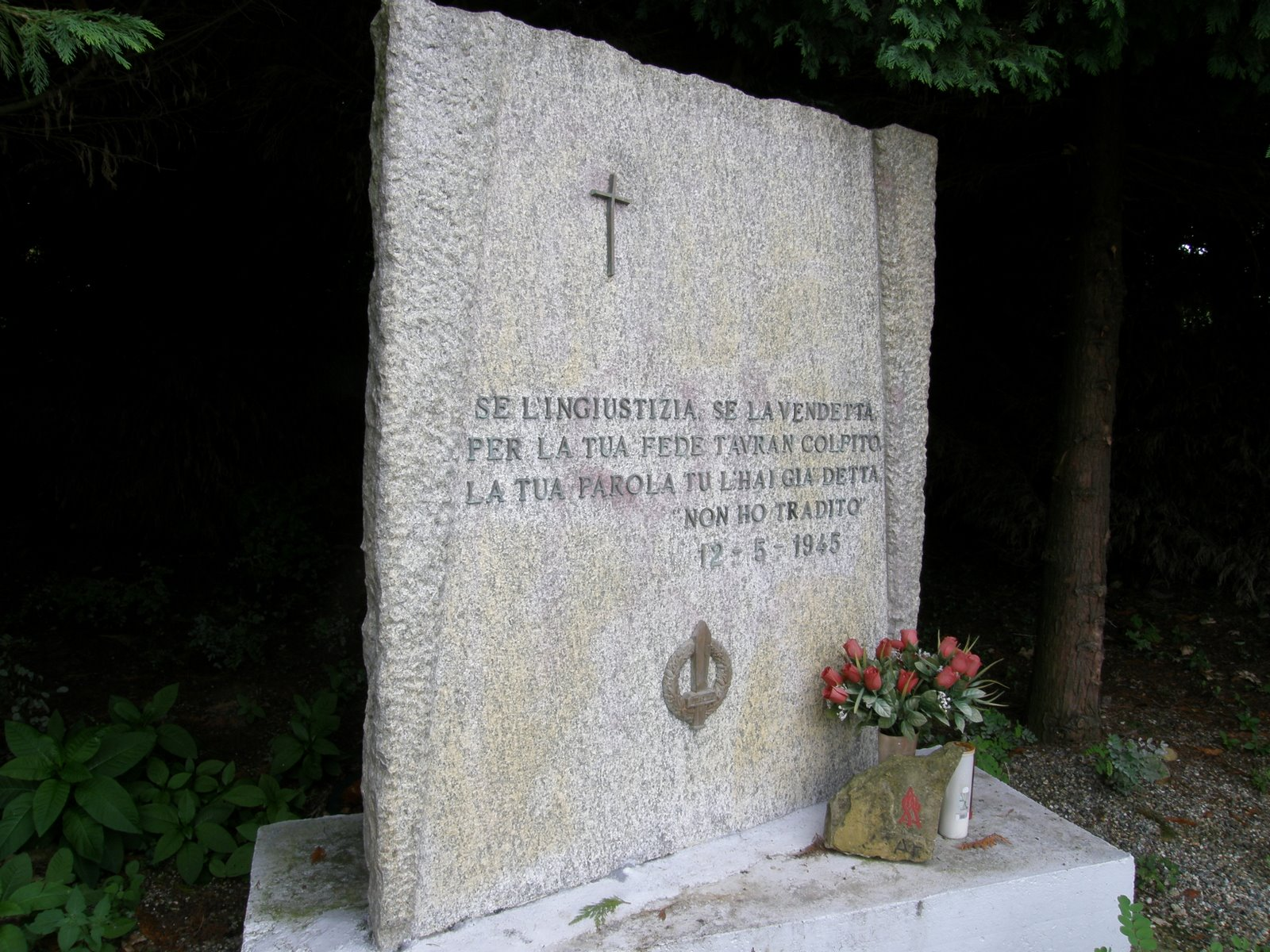
Memorial stone of the massacre at the OPN (Vercelli) and the memorial at the Cavour Bridge (Greggio)

Reductionist associations commemorate the massacre each year with a mass at the Novara camp and commemorations at the sites where it took place.

== Historical evaluation ==
Claudio Pavone expressly called the Vercelli massacre a "reprisal": "When, between 28 and 29 April 1945, the Germans trying to break through to the east operated massacres of partisans and civilians in the Santhià area, the partisans shot an equal number of fascists in reprisal in Vercelli."

Cesare Bermani has thus characterized the facts: "The Vercelli incident, if indeed it took place in the manner indicated by the police documents, would seem to confirm, even in the forms of retaliation, the logic of the 'eye for an eye,' with introjection at times of behavior already assumed by the enemy, which is present in every civil war."

== See also ==
- Italian resistance movement
- Brigate Garibaldi
- Italian Civil War
- Michele Morsero

== Bibliography ==
=== Parliamentary acts ===
In chronological order.

- Seduta di venerdì 25 febbraio 1949, in Atti Parlamentari. Camera dei Deputati, pp. 6507 ss.
- Domanda di autorizzazione a procedere in giudizio contro i deputati Moranino e Ortona.
  - doc. II, n. 144, 3 ottobre 1949
  - doc. II, n. 144 bis, 23 giugno 1950
  - doc. II, n. 137, 17 agosto 1953
  - doc. II, n. 137 bis, 12 novembre 1954
- Relazione della giunta per le autorizzazioni a procedere sulla domanda di autorizzazione a procedere in giudizio contro i deputati Moranino e Ortona, doc. II, nn. 137 e 137 bis A, 8 luglio 1957.
- Domanda di autorizzazione a procedere in giudizio contro il deputato Baltaro, doc. II, n. 137 ter, 11 luglio 1957.

=== Books and essays ===
- Ambrosio, Piero (1987). "Biellese e Vercellese". L'insurrezione in Piemonte. Milan: FrancoAngeli.
- Bermani, Cesare (1996). Pagine di guerriglia. L'esperienza dei garibaldini della Valsesia (Nuova Edizione 1996-2000, Vol. III ed.). Borgosesia: Istituto per la Storia della Resistenza e della società contemporanea nelle provincie di Biella e Vercelli "Cino Moscatelli".
- Pansa, Giampaolo (1965). La Resistenza in Piemonte. Guida bibliografica 1943-1963. Turin: Giappichelli Editore.
- Pansa, Giampaolo (2003). Il sangue dei vinti. Milan: Sperling & Kupfer. ISBN 88-200-3566-9.
- Pavesi, Pierangelo (2007). La Colonna Morsero. Copiano (PV): Grafica Ma. Ro. Editrice. ISBN 978-88-901807-8-1.
- Pavone, Claudio (1991). Una guerra civile. Saggio storico sulla moralità nella Resistenza. Turin: Bollati Boringhieri. ISBN 88-339-0629-9.
- Roccia, Domenico (1949). Il Giellismo Vercellese. Vercelli: Tip. Ed. La Sesia.
- Uboldi, Raffaello (2004). 25 aprile 1945. I giorni dell'odio e della libertà. Milan: Mondadori. ISBN 88-04-52677-7.

=== Articles ===
- Donata Belossi, Il partigiano-ebreo che amava Cogne, in La Stampa, March 11, 2005, p. 45.
