= Legislature I of Italy =

1st legislature of the Italian Republic (1948–1953)

Legislature I of Italy I legislatura della Repubblica Italiana
- 1st legislature

Type
- Type: bicameral
- Houses: Chamber of Deputies; Senate of the Republic

History
- Founded: 8 May 1948
- Disbanded: 24 June 1953 (5 years, 47 days)
- Preceded by: Constituent Assembly
- Succeeded by: II Legislature

Leadership
- President of the Senate: List: Ivanoe Bonomi, PSLI (8 may 1948 – 20 April 1951) Enrico De Nicola, PLI (28 April 1951 – 24 June 1952) Giuseppe Paratore, PLI (26 June 1952 – 23 March 1953) Meuccio Ruini, Ind (25 March 1953 – 24 June 1953)
- President of the Chamber of Deputies: Giovanni Gronchi, DC since 8 May 1948

Structure
- Seats: 574 (C); 343 (S)
- Chamber of Deputies political groups: DC (305); FDP (183); US (33); BN (19); PNM (14); PRI (9); MSI (6); SVP (3); PdCI (1); PSd'Az (1)
- Senate political groups: DC (148); PCI (77); PSI (41); US (23); PRI (11); BN (10); MSI (3); SVP (2); PSd'Az (1); Others (27)

Elections
- Chamber of Deputies voting system: Proportional
- Senate voting system: Proportional
- Last general election: 18 April 1948

Meeting place
- Palazzo Montecitorio, Rome (C)
- Palazzo Madama, Rome (S)

Website
- First Legislature – Chamber of Deputies; First Legislature – Senate

Constitution
- Constitution of Italy

The Legislature I of Italy (Italian: I Legislatura della Repubblica Italiana) was the 1st legislature of the Italian Republic, and lasted from 8 May 1948 until 24 June 1953. Its composition was the one resulting from the general election of 18 April 1948.

== Main chronology ==
In the 1948 Italian general election, the Christian Democracy (DC) party went on to win a decisive victory with the support of the Catholic Church and obtained 48.5% of the vote, defeating the leftist social-communist alliance of the Popular Democratic Front (FDP). Despite his party's absolute majority in the Italian Parliament, Prime Minister Alcide De Gasperi continued to govern at the head of the centrist coalition, which was successively abandoned by the Italian Liberal Party (PLI) in 1950 and by the Socialist Party of Italian Workers (PSLI) in 1951.

Under De Gasperi, the first republican Parliament carried out major land reforms to help the poorer rural regions in the early postwar years, with farms appropriated from the large landowners and parcelled out to the peasants. In addition, the Parliament passed a number of laws safeguarding employees from exploitation, established a national health service, and initiated low-cost housing in Italy’s major cities. The main laws approved by the Parliament included:

- Law 28 February 1949, n. 43 – "Measures to increase workers' employment, facilitating the construction of houses for workers". The law, also known as Fanfani house program, was promoted by the Minister of Labour Amintore Fanfani and launched a seven-year plan for popular housing to increase the stock of economic housing by means of construction or purchase of economic accommodation. The law also established a special housing fund, the so-called "INA-Casa", within the National Institute for Insurance.
- Law 10 August 1950, n. 646 – "Establishment of the Fund for extraordinary works of public interest in Southern Italy". The law established the Cassa per il Mezzogiorno (Fund for the South) to encourage the development of public works and infrastructure (roads, bridges, hydroelectric and irrigation) projects, and to provide credit subsidies and tax advantages to promote investments in the poor and mainly agricultural regions of Southern Italy.
- Law 21 October 1950, n. 841 – "Rules for expropriation, reclamation, transformation and assignment of land to peasants", also known as the "Agrarian Reform". The law promoted the redistribution of lands to peasants in the poorer rural regions and the formation of agricultural cooperatives.
- Law 24 February 1951, n. 84 – "Rules for the election of municipal councils". The reform changed the electoral law used for the election of the municipal councils, introducing a block voting system and abolishing the proportional representation.
- Law 31 March 1953, n. 87 – "Amendments to the law for the election of the Chamber of Deputies", also known as Scam Law.

The end of the legislature was characterized by some controversial changes in the electoral law proposed by the government. Even if the general structure remained uncorrupted, the government introduced a superbonus of two thirds of seats in the Chamber of Deputies for the coalition which would obtain at-large the absolute majority of votes. The change was hugely opposed by the opposition parties as well as the smaller DC coalition partners, which had no realistic chances of success. The new law was called Scam Law by its detractors, including some dissidents of minor government parties who founded special opposition groups to deny the artificial landslide to the DC.

=== Presidential election ===
On 10 May 1948 the newly elected Parliament met to elect the first President of Italy. On 11 May 1948 liberal economist Luigi Einaudi was elected on the fourth ballot with 518 votes out of 900.

== Government ==
Prime Minister	Party	Term of office		Government	Composition
Prime Minister	Party	Took office	Left office	Government	Composition
Alcide De Gasperi (1881–1954)	Christian Democracy	23 May 1948	27 January 1950	De Gasperi V	DC • PSLI • PLI • PRI (Centrism)
Alcide De Gasperi (1881–1954)	Christian Democracy	27 January 1950	26 July 1951	De Gasperi VI	DC • PSLI • PRI (Centrism)
Alcide De Gasperi (1881–1954)	Christian Democracy	26 July 1951	16 July 1953	De Gasperi VII	DC • PRI (Centrism)

Confidence votes

=== De Gasperi V Cabinet ===
16 June–2 July 1948 Investiture votes for De Gasperi V Cabinet
House of Parliament	Vote	Parties	Votes
Chamber of Deputies (Voting: 513 of 574, Majority: 257)	Yes	DC, PSLI, PLI, PRI	346 / 513
Chamber of Deputies (Voting: 513 of 574, Majority: 257)	No	FDP, MSI, PNM	167 / 513
Senate of the Republic (Voting: 255 of 343, Majority: 128)	Yes	DC, PSLI, PLI, PRI	184 / 255
Senate of the Republic (Voting: 255 of 343, Majority: 128)	No	PCI, PSI, MSI, PNM	67 / 255
Senate of the Republic (Voting: 255 of 343, Majority: 128)	Abstention	Others	4 / 255

=== De Gasperi VI Cabinet ===
14 February–1 March 1950 Investiture votes for De Gasperi VI Cabinet
House of Parliament	Vote	Parties	Votes
Chamber of Deputies (Voting: 503 of 574, Majority: 252)	Yes	DC, PSLI, PRI	314 / 503
Chamber of Deputies (Voting: 503 of 574, Majority: 252)	No	PCI, PSI, PLI, MSI, PNM	189 / 503
Senate of the Republic (Voting: 296 of 343, Majority: 149)	Yes	DC, PSLI, PRI	176 / 296
Senate of the Republic (Voting: 296 of 343, Majority: 149)	No	PCI, PSI, PLI, MSI, PNM	110 / 296
Senate of the Republic (Voting: 296 of 343, Majority: 149)	Abstention	Others	10 / 296

=== De Gasperi VII Cabinet ===
8–9 August 1951 Investiture votes for De Gasperi VII Cabinet
House of Parliament	Vote	Parties	Votes
Senate of the Republic (Voting: 260 of 343, Majority: 131)	Yes	DC, PRI	151 / 260
Senate of the Republic (Voting: 260 of 343, Majority: 131)	No	PCI, PSI, PSLI, PLI, MSI, PNM	101 / 260
Senate of the Republic (Voting: 260 of 343, Majority: 131)	Abstention	Others	8 / 260
Chamber of Deputies (Voting: 466 of 574, Majority: 234)	Yes	DC, PRI	291 / 466
Chamber of Deputies (Voting: 466 of 574, Majority: 234)	No	PCI, PSI, PSLI, PLI, MSI, PNM	175 / 503

== Parliamentary composition ==
=== Chamber of Deputies ===
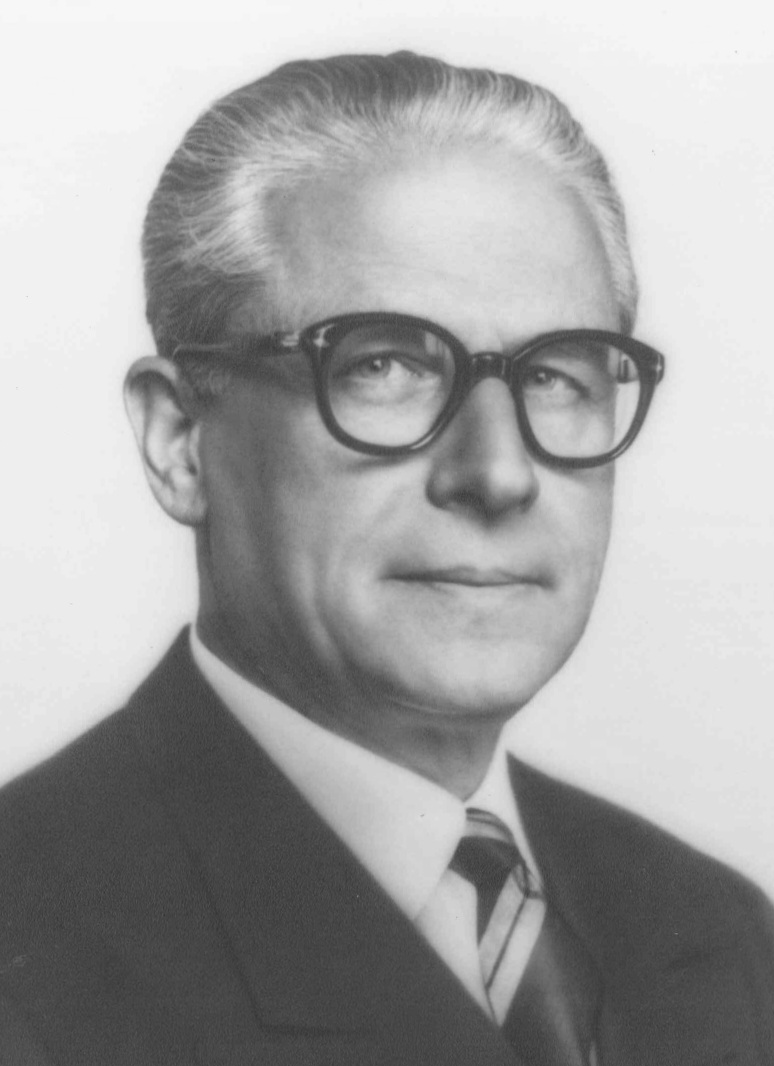
Giovanni Gronchi, President of the Chamber of Deputies

- President: Giovanni Gronchi (DC), elected on 8 May 1948
- Vice Presidents: Giuseppe Fruschini (DC, until 10 July 1949), Gaetano Martino (PLI), Giuseppe Chiostergi (PRI), Ferdinando Targetti (PSI, until 21 January 1953)

Parliamentary groups in the Chamber of Deputies
Initial composition (8 May 1948)		Final composition (24 June 1953)		
Parliamentary group	Seats	Parliamentary group	Seats	Change
Christian Democracy	305	Christian Democracy	300	▼5
Popular Democratic Front	183	Italian Communist Party	126	▼4
Popular Democratic Front	183	Italian Socialist Party	53	▼4
Socialist Unity	33	Socialist Unity	33	Steady
National Bloc	19	Italian Liberal Party	13	▼6
Monarchist National Party	14	Monarchist National Party	19	▲5
Italian Republican Party	9	Italian Republican Party	8	▼1
Italian Social Movement	6	Italian Social Movement	6	Steady
Mixed	5	Mixed	16	▲11
Südtiroler Volkspartei	3	Südtiroler Volkspartei	3	Steady
Peasants' Party of Italy	1	Peasants' Party of Italy	1	Steady
Sardinian Action Party	1	Sardinian Action Party	1	Steady
		Independents – Non inscrits	11	▲11
Total seats	574	Total seats	574	Steady

=== Senate of the Republic ===
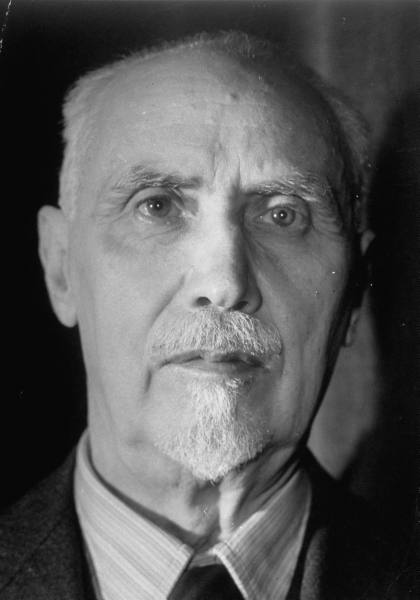
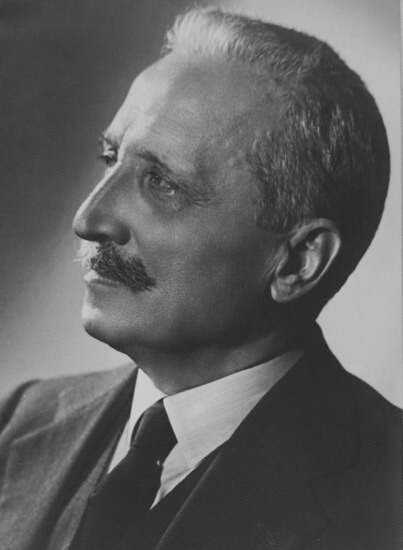
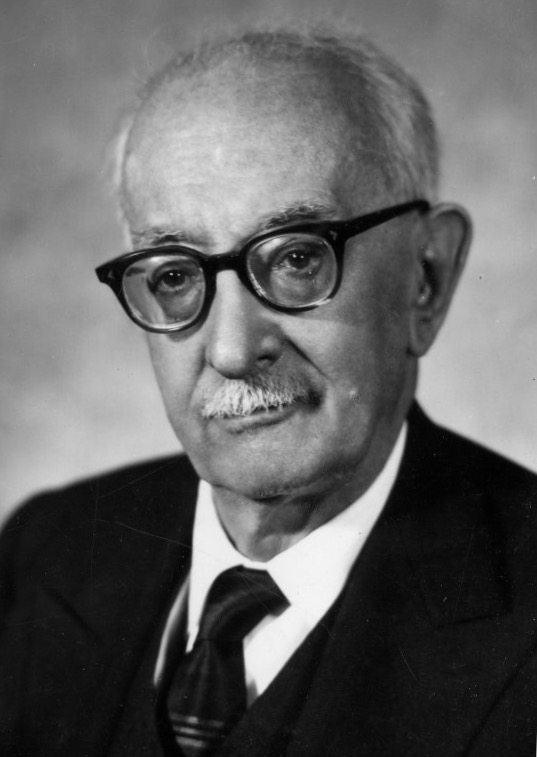
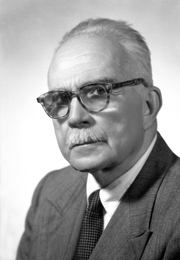
Presidents of the Senate: Ivanoe Bonomi (1948–1951), Enrico De Nicola (1951–1952), Giuseppe Paratore (1951–1952), Meuccio Ruini (1952–1953)
- Presidents:
  - Ivanoe Bonomi (PSLI), elected on 8 May 1948 and resigned on 20 April 1951;
  - Enrico De Nicola (PLI), elected on 28 April 1951 and resigned on 24 June 1952;
  - Giuseppe Paratore (PLI), elected on 26 June 1952 and resigned on 23 March 1953;
  - Meuccio Ruini (Ind), elected on 25 March 1953.
- Vice Presidents: Antonio Alberti (DC, until 16 March 1953), Salvatore Aldisio (DC, until 26 January 1950), Mauro Scoccimarro (PCI), Enrico Molé (US), Adone Zoli (DC, from 3 March 1950 to 25 July 1951), Giovanni Battista Bertone (DC, from 10 August 1951), Umberto Tupini (DC, from 17 March 1953)

Parliamentary groups in the Senate of the Republic
Initial composition (8 May 1948)		Final composition (24 June 1953)		
Parliamentary group	Seats	Parliamentary group	Seats	Change
Christian Democracy	148	Christian Democracy	146	▼2
Italian Communist Party	77	Italian Communist Party	73	▼4
Italian Socialist Party	41	Italian Socialist Party	38	▼3
Socialist Unity	23	Socialist Unity	21	▼2
Italian Republican Party	11	Italian Republican Party	7	▼4
National Bloc	10	Italian Liberal Party	9	▼1
Italian Social Movement	3	Italian Social Movement	3	Steady
Mixed	30	Mixed	20	▼10
Südtiroler Volkspartei	2	Südtiroler Volkspartei	2	Steady
Sardinian Action Party	1	Sardinian Action Party	1	Steady
Independents – Non inscrits	27	Independents – Non inscrits	17	▼10
Total seats	343	Total seats	317 (Note: Senators elected in 1948 were actually 237. The new Senate was initially composed by newly-elected senators and former members of the Constituent Assembly, of which 32 died during the term and weren't replaced. 8 new lifetime senators were appointed during the term by President Luigi Einaudi.)	▼26

==== Senators for Life ====
Senator	Motivation	Appointed by	From	Till
Enrico De Nicola	Former President of Italy	ex officio	12 May 1948	Next legislature
Guido Castelnuovo	Merits in the scientific field	President Luigi Einaudi	5 December 1949	27 April 1952 (deceased)
Arturo Toscanini	Merits in the artistic field	President Luigi Einaudi	5 December 1949	7 December 1949 (resigned)
Pietro Canonica	Merits in the artistic field	President Luigi Einaudi	1 December 1950	Next legislature
Gaetano De Sanctis	Merits in the social and literary field	President Luigi Einaudi	1 December 1950	Next legislature
Pasquale Jannaccone	Merits in the social field	President Luigi Einaudi	1 December 1950	Next legislature
Carlo Alberto Salustri, known as "Trilussa"	Merits in the literary field	President Luigi Einaudi	1 December 1950	21 December 1950 (deceased)
Luigi Sturzo	Merits in the social field	President Luigi Einaudi	17 September 1952	Next legislature
Umberto Zanotti Bianco	Merits in the artistic and social field	President Luigi Einaudi	17 September 1952	Next legislature

== Gallery ==
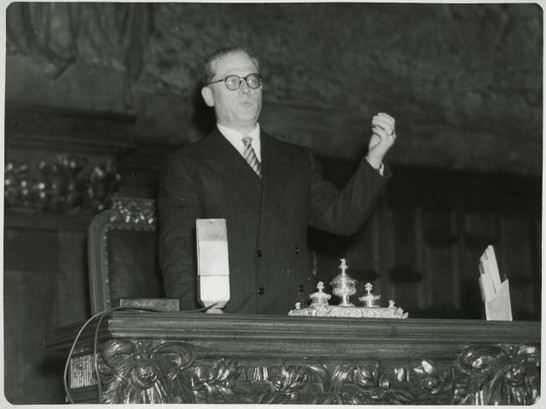
Giovanni Gronchi as President of the Chamber of Deputies in 1948

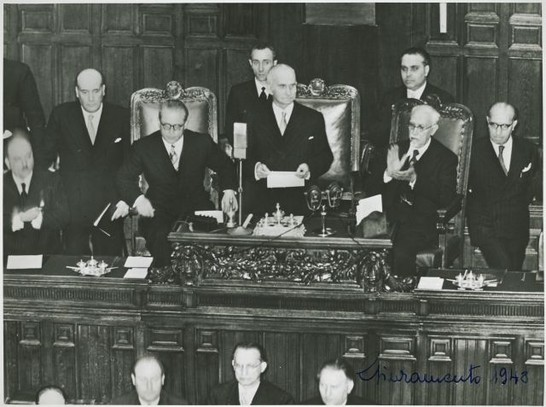
President Luigi Einaudi inaugural address on 12 May 1948

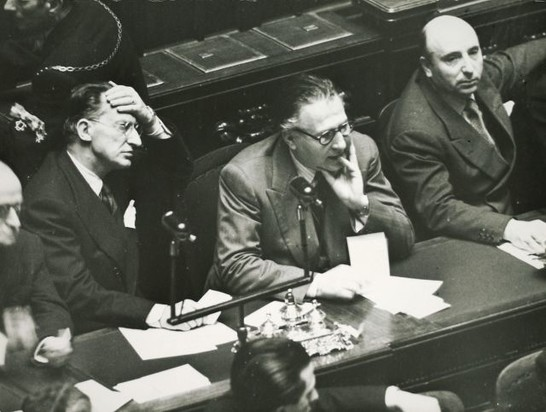
Prime Minister De Gasperi with ministers Pacciardi and Scelba in front of the Chamber of Deputies (1948)
