= Michele Morsero =

Italian Fascist politician and soldier

Prefect of the Province of Vercelli
- In office 27 October 1943 – 26 April 1945
- Preceded by: Giuseppe Murino
- Succeeded by: Giovanni Cantono Ceva
- Member of the Chamber of Fasces and Corporations
- In office 23 March 1939 – 5 August 1943

Personal details
- Born: 9 October 1895 Turin, Kingdom of Italy
- Died: 2 May 1945 (aged 49) Vercelli, Kingdom of Italy
- Party: National Fascist Party; Republican Fascist Party

Military service
- Allegiance: Kingdom of Italy
- Branch/service: Royal Italian Army; MVSN
- Rank: Colonel
- Commands: "Laredo" Blackshirt Battalion; 1st Blackshirt Legion "Sabauda"; 141st Assault Blackshirt Legion "Volturno"
- Battles/wars: World War I; Second Italo-Ethiopian War; Second Battle of Tembien; Spanish Civil War; World War II; Greco-Italian War
- Awards: Silver Medal of Military Valor; War Cross for Military Valor (twice)

Michele Morsero (9 October 1895 – 2 May 1945) was an Italian Fascist politician and soldier, prefect of the province of Vercelli during the Italian Social Republic.

== Biography ==
Born in Piedmont in 1895, Morsero worked as an accountant and tax consultant. He was an interventionist and a volunteer in the First World War, after which he joined the Fascist movement, participating in the march on Rome and enlisting in the Voluntary Militia for National Security. He participated in the Second Italo-Ethiopian War with the rank of primo seniore (Lieutenant Colonel) in the 180th Blackshirt Legion "Alessandro Farnese", receiving a silver medal for military valor for his role in the Second Battle of Tembien.

He then participated in the Spanish Civil War in the ranks of the Corps of Volunteer Troops, commanding the "Laredo" Battalion of the "Black Arrows" Brigade, receiving two War Crosses for Military Valor. He then continued his career in the MVSN, reaching the rank of console (Colonel) in command of the 1st Blackshirt Legion "Sabauda" of Turin. In 1939 he became a member of the Chamber of Fasces and Corporations. After Italy's entry into the Second World War, he fought with the rank of lieutenant colonel in the army and console of the MVSN on the Albanian front, at the head of the 141st Assault Blackshirt Legion "Volturno", part of the 51st Infantry Division Siena.

After the Armistice of Cassibile, he joined the Italian Social Republic and was appointed federal secretary of the Republican Fascist Party (PFR) of Lucca. On 20 October 1943 he was replaced in this post by Mario Piazzesi, and on 27 October he was appointed second class prefect and entrusted the province of Vercelli; he immediately set out to rebuild the local section of the PFR, but obtained few adhesions. On November 25, Morsero, after a meeting with a delegation of workers from Vercelli, arranged for a fifty percent increase in salary, aimed at bringing "a decisive adjustment of wages to the real cost of living today". Partisan actions, initially bloodless, escalated later in the year, and on 2 December the fascists suffered their first casualties in an attack on the garrison of Varallo Pombia. Following this action, Morsero requested more troops from the RSI authorities and the German commands, in order to supplement the meager forces available to garrison the province; in mid-December industrial workers went on strike.

On 13 December 1943 Morsero wrote to the German command of Vercelli: "I think it useful to inform you that the deplorable actions of the rebels increase day by day and cause very serious material damage as well as negatively affect the orientation of the population and therefore public order. It would be necessary to immediately react to each of their actions, but for the reasons that have already been explained several times, we do not have sufficient police forces to provide for it. I have requested men and weapons, but to date higher commanders have not been able to fulfill my requests. This situation worries me for defense national economy and for the assertion of prestige of the authorities. Please inform your superiors of the situation for appropriate intervention." Following Morsero's requests, the RSI government sent the 1st Assault Legion "M" "Tagliamento" to the Vercelli area on 19 December. When an officer of the GNR autonomously raised irregular units to be used in "counter-band" actions, Morsero ordered him to withdraw them since action against the partisans had to take place with normal police actions.

Following a telegram signed by the Minister of the Interior Guido Buffarini Guidi who ordered the internment of Jews in special concentration camps, on 6 December Morsero ordered to act "with the utmost diligence and strict criteria" and instructed the mayor of Vercelli, Mario Busca, to set up a concentration camp at the Aravecchia farmhouse, which became operational on 24 December. On December 9, it was decided that seals were to be placed on Jewish homes.

On April 18, 1945, new strikes began, which soon spread to the entire province. With the Allies advancing across the Po Valley, the Italian Social Republic was on the brink of collapse and between 23 and 26 April all remaining troops of the Italian Social Republic gathered in Vercelli from the various garrisons of the province (as well as from neighbouring Biella), placing themselves under Morsero's command. Altogether, these troops numbered over two thousand, including several families of collaborators; grouped in the "Morsero column", they left Vercelli and headed towards Novara, with the intention of reaching the Valtellina Redoubt, but on 27 April they were stopped by the partisans near Castellazzo Novarese. After some clashes and long negotiations, Morsero and GNR Colonel Giovanni Fracassi surrendered the column to the partisans on 28 April. Morsero was then taken back to Vercelli, where he was tried and sentenced to death for treason and first degree murders under Italian law by a partisan court; he was executed by firing squad on 2 May 1945, along with the new mayor of Vercelli, Angelo Mazzucco, a police official and three Fascist Party officials.

== See also ==
- Vercelli psychiatric hospital massacre
