= 1948 Italian general election =

Italian election

- 18 April 1948

All 574 seats in the Chamber of Deputies 288 seats needed for a majority 237 seats in the Senate 172 seats needed for a majority (Note: Total takes into account the 106 unelected senators who served ex officio throughout the legislature I of Italy, pursuant to Article III of the Final and Transitional Provisions of the Constitution of Italy.)
- Registered: 29,117,554 (C) · 25,874,809 (S)
- Turnout: 26,855,741 (C) · 92.2% 23,842,919 (S) · 92.2%
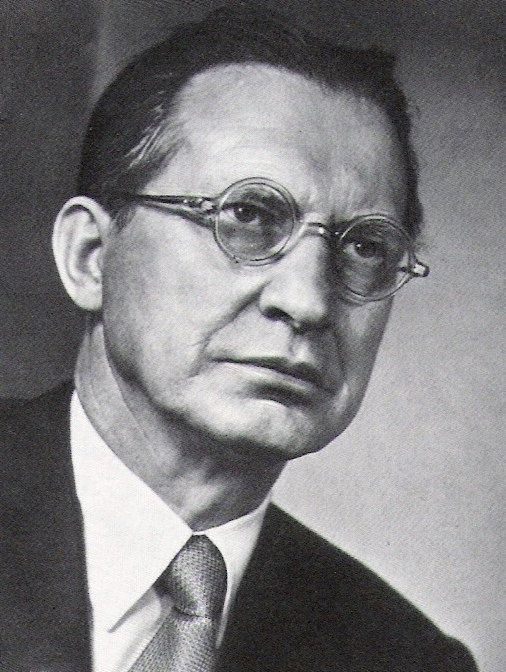

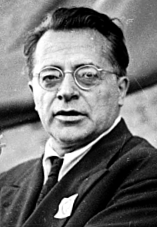

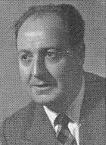

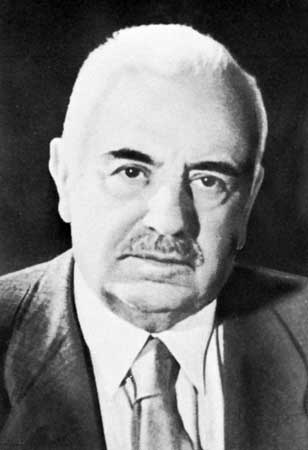

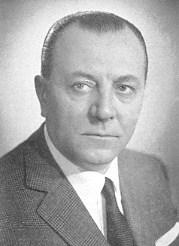

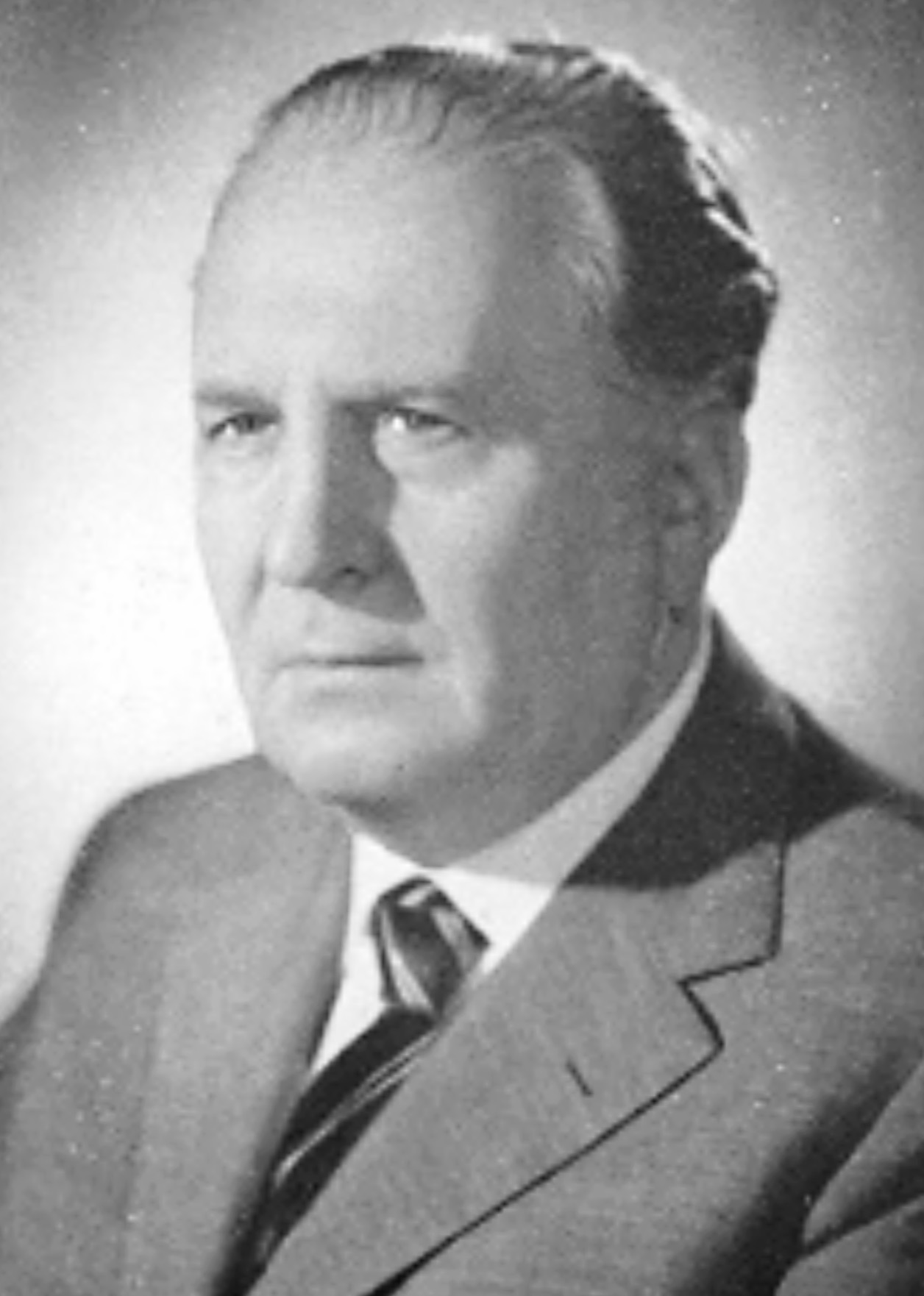
	Majority party	Minority party	Third party
Leader	Alcide De Gasperi (Note: Although Attilio Piccioni was the secretary of the Christian Democracy at the time of the election, Alcide De Gasperi was nonetheless considered the party's undisputed leader.)	Palmiro Togliatti (Note: Togliatti formally shared the leadership of the coalition with the Italian Socialist Party (PSI) secretary Pietro Nenni. Togliatti was the FDP candidate who received the most votes in the 1948 election.)	Giuseppe Saragat
Party	DC	FDP	US
Leader since	29 December 1944	28 December 1947 (Note: Togliatti also served as secretary of the Communist Party of Italy (PCd'I) from 1926 to 1934 and from 1938 to 1943. Since 1943, he served as secretary of the Italian Communist Party (PCI).)	11 January 1947
Leader's seat	Trento (C)	Rome (C)	Turin (C)
Seats won	305 (C) / 131 (S)	183 (C) / 72 (S)	33 (C) / 10 (S)
Popular vote	12,740,042 (C); 10,899,640 (S)	8,136,637 (C); 6,969,122 (S)	1,858,116 (C); 943,219 (S)
Percentage	48.5% (C); 48.1% (S)	31.0% (C); 30.8% (S)	7.1% (C); 4.6% (S)
	Fourth party	Fifth party	Sixth party
Leader	Francesco Saverio Nitti	Alfredo Covelli	Randolfo Pacciardi
Party	BN	PNM	PRI
Leader since	9 January 1948	11 June 1946	20 January 1947 (Note: Pacciardi also served as secretary from 1945 to 1946.)
Leader's seat	Did not stand (Senator by right)	Benevento (C)	Pisa (C)
Seats won	19 (C) / 7 (S)	14 (C) / 3 (S)	9 (C) / 4 (S)
Popular vote	1,003,727 (C); 1,222,419 (S)	729,078 (C); 393,510 (S)	651,875 (C); 594,178 (S)
Percentage	3.8% (C); 5.4% (S)	2.8% (C); 1.7% (S)	2.5% (C); 2.6% (S)
Prime Minister before election
Alcide De Gasperi
DC
Prime Minister after the election
Alcide De Gasperi
DC

General elections were held in Italy on 18 April 1948 to elect the first Parliament of the Italian Republic. After the Soviet-backed 1948 Czechoslovak coup d'état on 21–25 February, the United States became alarmed about Soviet intentions in Central Europe and feared that Italy would be drawn into the Soviet sphere of influence if the left-wing Popular Democratic Front (FDP), which consisted of the Italian Communist Party (PCI) and the Italian Socialist Party (PSI), were to win the 1948 general election. As the last month of the election campaign began, Time published an article arguing that an FDP victory would push Italy to "the brink of catastrophe".

The U.S. consequently intervened in the election by heavily funding the centrist coalition led by Christian Democracy (DC) and launching an anti-communist propaganda campaign in Italy. The U.S. Central Intelligence Agency (CIA) claims that the Soviet Union responded by sending exorbitant funds to the FDP coalition; however, the PCI disputed this claim and expressed its discontent with what it perceived as a lack of support from the Soviets.

The DC won the election by a comfortable margin and defeated the FDP coalition. The DC went on to form a government without the leftists, who had been expelled from the government coalition in the May 1947 crises and remained frozen out, and became the de facto ruling party of the First Italian Republic. It represented the start of the Italian party system of centrism that lasted until the 1960s when the PSI was allowed to join the government as part of the organic centre-left system.

== Electoral system ==
The pure party-list proportional representation chosen two years before for the election of the Constituent Assembly was adopted for the Chamber of Deputies. Italian provinces were divided into 31 constituencies, each electing a group of candidates. (Note: The number of seats for each constituency went from 1 for Aosta Valley to 36 for Milan.) In each constituency, seats were divided between open lists using the largest remainder method with the Imperiali quota. Remaining votes and seats transferred to the national level, where special closed lists of national leaders received the last seats using the Hare quota.

For the Senate, 237 single-seat constituencies were created. The candidates needed a two-thirds majority to be elected, but only 15 aspiring senators were elected this way. All remaining votes and seats were grouped in party lists and regional constituencies, where the D'Hondt method was used: Inside the lists, candidates with the best percentages were elected. This electoral system became standard in Italy, and was used until 1993.

== Political parties and leaders ==
Political party	Ideology	Leader	Seats in 1946
Popular Democratic Front (FDP)	Socialism, communism	Palmiro Togliatti, Pietro Nenni	219
Christian Democracy (DC)	Christian democracy	Alcide De Gasperi	207
National Bloc (BN)	Conservative liberalism	Francesco Saverio Nitti	71
Italian Republican Party (PRI)	Liberalism	Randolfo Pacciardi	23
Monarchist National Party (PNM)	Monarchism	Alfredo Covelli	16
Socialist Unity (US)	Social democracy	Giuseppe Saragat	Did not exist
Italian Social Movement (MSI)	Neo-fascism	Giorgio Almirante	Did not exist

== Campaign ==
The election remain unmatched in verbal aggression and fanaticism in Italy's period of democracy. According to the historian Gianni Corbi, the 1948 election was "the most passionate, the most important, the longest, the dirtiest, and the most uncertain electoral campaign in Italian history". The election was between two competing visions of the future of Italian society: on the right it was a Roman Catholic, conservative, and capitalist Italy, represented by the governing DC of Alcide De Gasperi, and on the left was a secular, revolutionary, and socialist society, linked to the Soviet Union and represented by the FDP coalition led by the PCI.

The DC ran a campaign that pointed to the Communist coup in Czechoslovakia. It warned that in Communist countries "children send parents to jail", "children are owned by the state", and told voters that disaster would strike Italy if the Communists were to take power. Another slogan was "In the secrecy of the polling booth, God sees you – Stalin doesn't."

The FDP campaign focused on living standards and avoided embarrassing questions of foreign policy, such as United Nations membership (vetoed by the Soviet Union) and Communist Yugoslavia control of Trieste, or losing American financial and food aid through the Marshall Plan. The PCI led the FDP coalition and had effectively marginalised the PSI, which suffered loss in terms of parliamentary seats and political power. (Note: The PCI gained more than the two-thirds of the seats won by the joint list.) The PSI had also been hurt by the secession of a social-democratic faction led by Giuseppe Saragat, which contested the election with the concurrent list of Socialist Unity (US).

The PCI had difficulties in restraining its more militant members, who in the period immediately after the war had engaged in violent acts of reprisals. The areas affected by the violence (the "Red Triangle" of Emilia, or parts of Liguria around Genoa and Savona, for instance) had previously seen episodes of brutality committed by the Italian fascists during Benito Mussolini's regime and the Italian Resistance during the Allied advance through Italy.

== Foreign interference ==
The 1948 general election was greatly influenced by the Cold War that was underway between the Soviet Union and the United States. After his defeat in the election, PCI leader Palmiro Togliatti stated on 22 April: "The elections were not free ... Brutal foreign intervention was used consisting of a threat to starve the country by withholding ERP aid if it voted for the Democratic Front ... The menace to use the atom bomb against towns or regions" that voted pro-communist. The U.S. government's Voice of America radio began broadcasting anti-communist propaganda to Italy on 24 March 1948. By its own admission, the CIA gave US$1 million (equivalent to $13 million in 2025) to what they referred to as "center parties", and was accused of publishing forged letters to discredit the leaders of the PCI.

The National Security Act of 1947, which made foreign covert operations possible, had been signed into law about six months earlier by the U.S. President Harry S. Truman. U.S. agencies also sent ten million letters, made numerous short-wave radio broadcasts, and funded the publishing of books and articles, all of which warned Italians of the "consequences" of a Communist victory. Overall, the U.S. funnelled $10 million to $20 million (equivalent to $130 million to $270 million in 2025) into the country for specifically anti-PCI purposes. The CIA also made use of off-the-books sources of financing to interfere in the election: millions of dollars from the Economic Cooperation Administration affiliated with the Marshall Plan, and more than $10 million in captured Nazi money were steered to anti-communist propaganda.

That the United States provided support to anti-PCI groups, and reiterated that should the PCI win, the Marshall Plan and other aids could be terminated, was further corroborated by Luigi Einaudi, who wrote in his diary of a dinner at the home of Pietro Quaroni, the Italian Ambassador to the Soviet Union, that it was agreed the United States would not grant real aid with the PCI still in government. CIA operative F. Mark Wyatt stated: "We had bags of money that we delivered to selected politicians, to defray their political expenses, their campaign expenses, for posters, for pamphlets." Wyatt also claimed that in the lead up to the election the PCI received exorbitant funds of up to $10 million per month from the Soviet Union and that Italian authorities were aware of the Soviets' activities. This was disputed by the PCI, which voiced its frustration at the Soviets' lack of support for the FDP's campaign. Italian historian Alessandro Brogi dismisses the CIA's claims as "overexaggerated" and notes that the Soviets only undertook "ad hoc last minute diplomatic [and] financial action" because it feared that inaction in Italy would set a precedent for U.S. intervention in Eastern Europe. Despite amicable meetings in the postwar years between top PCI official Pietro Secchia and Soviet leader Joseph Stalin, the Soviets were apprehensive about committing to Italy financially, and only provided "occasional and modest" funds to the PCI.

The DC eventually won the 1948 election with 48 per cent of the vote, and the FDP received 31 per cent. The CIA's practice of influencing the political situation was repeated in every Italian election for at least the next 24 years. No left-leaning coalition won a general election until 1996. That was partly because of Italians' traditional bent for conservatism and even more importantly the Cold War, with the U.S. closely watching Italy in their determination to maintain a vital NATO presence amidst the Mediterranean and retain the Yalta-agreed status quo in Western Europe. The Irish government, motivated by the country's devout Catholicism, also interfered in the election by funnelling the modern day equivalent of €2 million through the Irish Embassy to the Vatican, which then distributed it to Catholic politicians. Joseph Walshe, Ireland's ambassador to the Vatican, had privately suggested secretly funding Azione Cattolica.

== Results ==
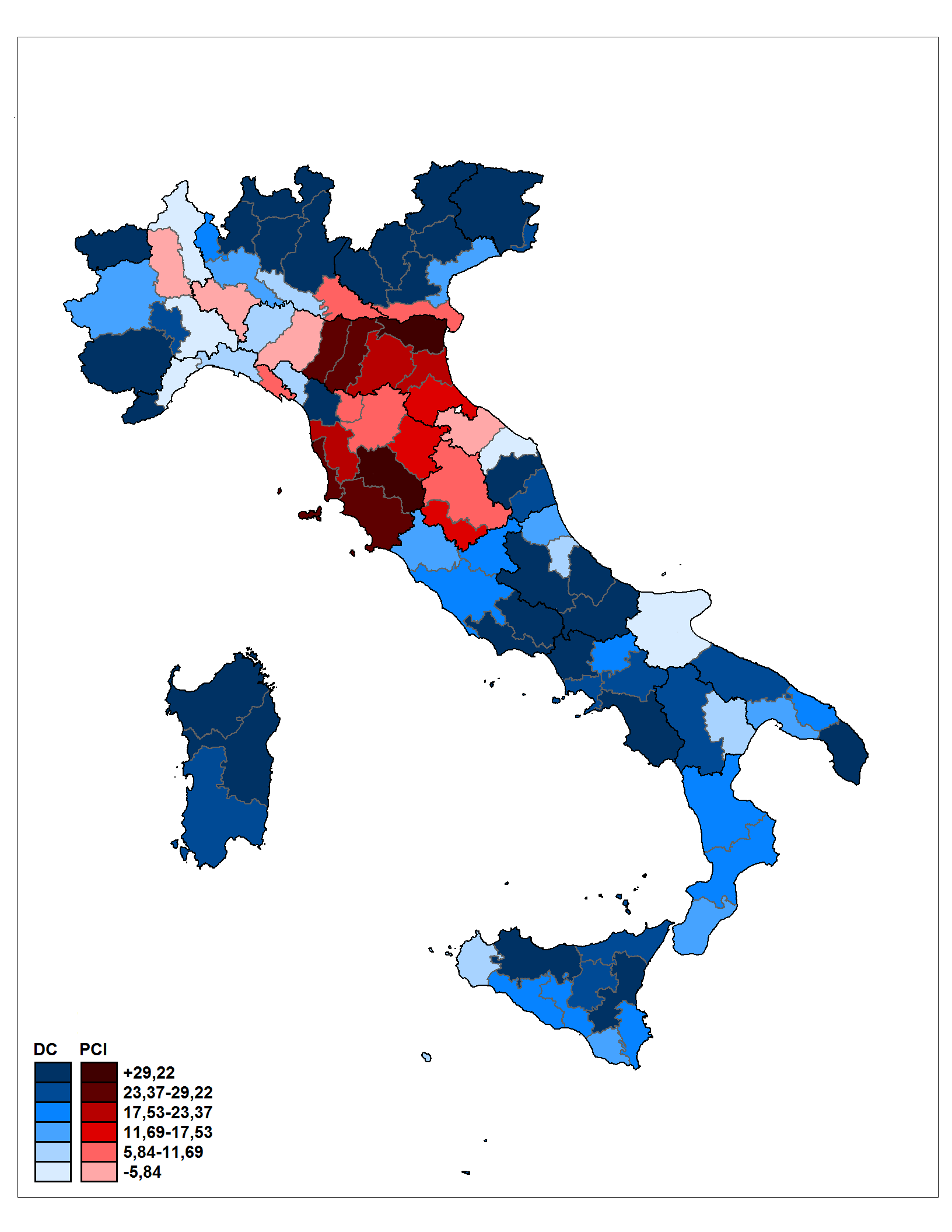
Differences of voting strength between DC and FDP in the country

The DC won a sweeping victory, taking 48.5 per cent of the vote and 305 seats in the Chamber of Deputies and 131 seats in the Senate of the Republic. With an absolute majority in both chambers of the Italian Parliament, Gasperi (the then DC leader and incumbent prime minister) could have formed a one-party government; however, he formed a centrist coalition with the Italian Liberal Party (PLI), the Italian Republican Party (PRI), and SU. De Gasperi formed three Council of Ministries during the parliamentary term, the second one in 1950 after the defection of the PLI who hoped for more rightist politics, and the third one in 1951 after the defection of the SU who hoped for more left-wing politics. Following a provision of the new republican Constitution of Italy, all living democratic deputies elected during the 1924 Italian general election and deposed by the National Fascist Party (PNF) in 1926, automatically became members of the first republican Senate.

=== Chamber of Deputies ===
Party	Votes	%	Seats	+/–
Christian Democracy	12,740,042	48.51	305	+98
Popular Democratic Front	8,136,637	30.98	183	−36
Socialist Unity	1,858,116	7.07	33	New
National Bloc	1,003,727	3.82	19	−52
Monarchist National Party	729,078	2.78	14	−2
Italian Republican Party	651,875	2.48	9	−14
Italian Social Movement	526,882	2.01	6	New
South Tyrolean People's Party	124,243	0.47	3	New
Peasants' Party of Italy	95,914	0.37	1	0
Social Christian Party	72,854	0.28	0	0
Sardinian Action Party	61,928	0.24	1	−1
Nationalist Movement for the Social Democracy	56,096	0.21	0	New
Federalist Movements' Union	52,655	0.20	0	New
Unionist People's Bloc	35,899	0.14	0	New
Internationalist Communist Party	20,736	0.08	0	0
Republican Progressive Democratic Front	14,482	0.06	0	–1
National Concentration of United Combatants	11,396	0.04	0	New
Italian Demolabourist Party	10,002	0.04	0	New
Independent Democratic Party of Pensioners	8,125	0.03	0	New
Independent Peasants' Party	6,733	0.03	0	New
Democratic Front of the Italians	5,481	0.02	0	New
Political Group The Right	4,300	0.02	0	New
National Association of Kindred Missing in War	3,707	0.01	0	New
Homeland and Freedom Party	3,178	0.01	0	New
Rural and Independent Concentration of Aosta Valley	2,906	0.01	0	New
Italian Anti-Bolshevik Front	2,756	0.01	0	New
Independent Socialist Union	2,637	0.01	0	New
Italian Popular Grouping	2,191	0.01	0	New
Single Anti-Communist Front – National Awakening	2,091	0.01	0	New
Maglio	1,642	0.01	0	New
Italian Confederation of Free Trade Unions	1,531	0.01	0	New
National Movement Casualties and Damaged by War	1,179	0.00	0	New
Sardinia League	1,117	0.00	0	0
Independent Catholic Movement Pax et Justitia	961	0.00	0	New
Italian Existentialist Party	816	0.00	0	New
Other parties	10,545	0.04	0	–
Total	26,264,458	100.00	574	+18
Valid votes	26,264,458	97.80		
Invalid/blank votes	591,283	2.20		
Total votes	26,855,741	100.00		
Registered voters/turnout	29,117,270	92.23		
Source: Ministry of the Interior

Popular vote
DC	48.51%
FDP	30.98%
US	7.07%
BN	3.82%
PNM	2.78%
PRI	2.48%
MSI	2.01%
Others	2.35%

Seats
DC	53.14%
FDP	31.88%
US	5.75%
BN	3.31%
PNM	2.44%
PRI	1.57%
MSI	1.05%
Others	0.87%

==== By constituency ====
Constituency	Total seats	Seats won							
Constituency	Total seats	DC	FDP	US	BN	PNM	PRI	MSI	Others
Turin	26	13	10	3					
Cuneo	16	9	4	2					1
Genoa	19	9	8	2					
Milan	36	18	14	4					
Como	14	9	4	1					
Brescia	19	14	4	1					
Mantua	10	5	5						
Trentino	9	5	1						3
Verona	28	19	7	2					
Venice	16	10	4	2					
Udine	14	9	3	2					
Bologna	24	7	13	2			2		
Parma	19	7	10	2					
Florence	13	6	7						
Pisa	15	7	7				1		
Siena	9	3	6						
Ancona	17	9	6	1			1		
Perugia	11	5	6						
Rome	35	20	10	1	1		2	1	
L'Aquila	16	10	5	1					
Campobasso	4	3			1				
Naples	31	17	7	1	1	4		1	
Benevento	18	11	3		2	2			
Bari	22	12	7		2	1			
Lecce	16	9	4		2	1			
Potenza	6	4	2						
Catanzaro	24	13	8		2			1	
Catania	26	15	5	2	2	2			
Palermo	25	13	6		2	2	1	1	
Cagliari	13	9	3		1				1
Aosta Valley	1	1							
National	21	4	4	4	3	2	2	2	
Total	574	305	183	33	19	14	9	6	5

=== Senate of the Republic ===
Party	Votes	%	Seats
Christian Democracy	10,899,640	48.11	131
Popular Democratic Front	6,969,122	30.76	72
National Bloc	1,222,419	5.40	7
Socialist Unity	943,219	4.16	8
US – PRI	607,792	2.68	4
Italian Republican Party	594,178	2.62	4
Monarchist National Party	393,510	1.74	3
Italian Social Movement	164,092	0.72	1
South Tyrolean People's Party	95,406	0.42	2
Peasants' Party of Italy	65,986	0.29	0
Sardinian Action Party	65,743	0.29	1
Federalist Movements' Union	42,880	0.19	0
Nationalist Movement for the Social Democracy	27,152	0.12	0
Republican Progressive Democratic Front	13,479	0.06	0
Rural and Independent Concentration of Aosta Valley	2,868	0.01	0
Independent Socialist Union	2,833	0.01	0
Other parties	2,932	0.01	0
Independents	544,039	2.40	4
Total	22,657,290	100.00	237
Valid votes	22,657,290	95.03	
Invalid/blank votes	1,185,629	4.97	
Total votes	23,842,919	100.00	
Registered voters/turnout	25,874,809	92.15	
Source: Ministry of the Interior

Popular vote
DC	48.11%
FDP	30.76%
BN	5.40%
US	4.16%
US–PRI	2.68%
PRI	2.62%
PNM	1.74%
Others	4.53%

Seats
DC	55.27%
FDP	30.38%
US	3.38%
BN	2.85%
US–PRI	1.69%
PRI	1.69%
PNM	1.27%
Others	3.38%

==== By constituency ====
Constituency	Total seats	Seats won								
Constituency	Total seats	DC	FDP	US	BN	US–PRI	PRI	PNM	Others	Ind.
Piedmont	17	8	6	2						1
Aosta Valley	1	1								
Lombardy	31	18	10			3				
Trentino-Alto Adige	6	4							2	
Veneto	19	14	4	1						
Friuli-Venezia Giulia	6	4	1			1				
Liguria	8	4	3	1						
Emilia-Romagna	17	6	9	1			1			
Tuscany	15	7	7	1						
Umbria	6	3	3							
Marche	7	4	2				1			
Lazio	16	10	5				1			
Abruzzo	6	4	2							
Molise	2	2								
Campania	21	11	4		2			1	1	2
Apulia	15	8	5		1					1
Basilicata	6	3	2	1						
Calabria	10	5	3		2					
Sicily	22	12	5	1	1		1	2		
Sardinia	6	3	1		1				1	
Total	237	131	72	8	7	4	4	3	4	4

== See also ==
- Foreign electoral intervention
- List of foreign electoral interventions
