= Italian Anti-Bolshevik Front =

Italian Anti-Bolshevik Front Fronte Antibolscevico Italiano
- Leader: Franz Navarra Viggiani
- Headquarters: Via Dell'orologio, Palermo
- Ideology: Fascism
- Chamber of Deputies: 0 / 574

The Italian Anti-Bolshevik Front (Italian: Fronte Antibolscevico Italiano, abbreviated FAI) was a political organization founded in Sicily, one of several fascist groups that surged in Italy in the years following the end of the Second World War. The organization was led by Franz Navarra Viggiani. The organization contested the 1948 parliamentary election in the Palermo-Trapani-Agrigento-Caltanissetta constituency. It obtained 2,756 votes (0.26% of the votes in the constituency).
