= National Bloc =

National Bloc can refer to:

- Lebanese National Bloc (Lebanon) (Arabic: الكتلة الوطنية), political party founded in 1936
- National Bloc (France) was a right-wing coalition, a majority at the French National Assembly from 1919 to 1924
- National Bloc (Syria)
- National Bloc (Mandatory Palestine) (al-Qutla al-Wataniyya) was a Nablus-based party established in 1935 in the Palestine by Abd al-Latif Salah
- National Socialist Bloc (Sweden) (Swedish: Nationalsocialistiska Blocket), a Swedish national socialist political party formed at the end of 1933
- National Bloc (Egypt) an Egyptian political party
- National Bloc (Italy, 1921) was a right-wing coalition formed for the 1921 Italian general election, notably including the National Fascist Party
- National Bloc (Italy, 1948) was a right-wing coalition formed for the 1948 Italian general election
