= Peasants' Party of Italy =

Peasants' Party of Italy Partito dei Contadini d'Italia
- Leader: Alessandro Scotti, Giacomo Boeris, Giovanni Cerruti
- Founded: 1920
- Dissolved: 1963
- Merged into: Italian Republican Party
- Newspaper: La Voce del Contadino
- Ideology: Agrarianism; Regionalism
- Political position: Centre

The Peasants' Party of Italy (Italian: Partito dei Contadini d'Italia) was a small political party in Italy founded in 1920 by Urbano Prunotto and Giacomo Scotti.

== History ==
Starting from left-wing agrarian and Christian leftist ideas, the party moved onto an independent ideological position, with the sole goal to defend the small farmers against major landowners. Its symbol was several ears of corn between two bunches of grapes, and its newspaper was called La Voce del Contadino ('The Peasant's Voice'). The party, founded in Piedmont, was never able to rise on a national plan, being limited to the Po Valley.

The party participated in the 1924 general election, where it elected 4 deputies, before being forcibly disbanded by the National Fascist Party government. After the war, the party was re-built by Alessandro Scotti, who was elected the party's sole deputy in 1946 general election, and 1948 general elections. However, the Christian Democracy had strongly taken the representation of the agrarian interests, and the party was consequently marginalised. It survived on the local level, but eventually disbanded and in 1963 merged with the Italian Republican Party.

== Election results ==
=== Chamber of Deputies ===
Election	Votes	%	Seats	+/−	Leader
1924	73,569 (11th)	1.03	4 / 535	–	Urbano Prunotto; Giacomo Scotti
1929	banned	–	0 / 400	▼4	–
1934	banned	–	0 / 400	–	–
1946	102,393 (10th)	0.44	1 / 556	▲1	Alessandro Scotti
1948	95,914 (9th)	0.37	1 / 574	–	Alessandro Scotti
1953	into PNM	–	1 / 590	–	Alessandro Scotti
1958	into MC	–	0 / 596	▼1	Giacomo Boeris

=== Senate ===
Election	Votes	%	Seats	+/−	Leader
1948	65,986 (10th)	0.29	0 / 237	–	Alessandro Scotti
1953	into PNM	–	0 / 237	–	Alessandro Scotti
1958	into MC	–	0 / 246	–	Giacomo Boeris
