= National Bloc (Italy, 1948) =

National Bloc Blocco Nazionale
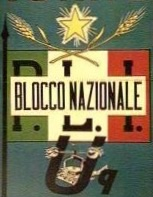
- Leader: Francesco Saverio Nitti
- Founded: 1948
- Headquarters: Rome, Italy
- Ideology: Conservatism; Liberism; Populism
- Political position: Right-wing

The National Bloc (Italian: Blocco Nazionale) was a right-wing electoral alliance formed for the 1948 Italian general election by the Italian Liberal Party and the Common Man's Front. The alliance soon disappeared, leaving only as a party with some electoral support.

== History ==
The electoral alliance scored a poor 3.8% in the election for the Chamber of Deputies, gaining 16 seats, while a 5.4% was reached for the Senate of the Republic where the single-man constituencies and the age-restricted suffrage gave an advantage to this list formed by old pre-Italian fascist politicians. The list generally suffered the concurrence of Christian Democracy, which was seen by centrist and right-wing electors as the sole shield against the left-wing Popular Democratic Front.

== Composition ==
Party	Ideology	Leader
Italian Liberal Party (PLI)	Liberalism	Roberto Lucifero d'Aprigliano
Common Man's Front (FUQ)	Populism	Guglielmo Giannini
Union for National Reconstruction	Liberalism	Francesco Saverio Nitti

== Election results ==
Chamber of Deputies
Election year	No. of overall votes	% of overall vote	No. of overall seats won	+/–
1948	1,003,727 (4th)	3.8	19 / 574	Francesco Saverio Nitti

Senate of the Republic
Election year	No. of overall votes	% of overall vote	No. of overall seats won	+/–
1948	1,222,419 (3rd)	5.4	7 / 237	Francesco Saverio Nitti
