= List of Italian governments =

This article lists Italian governments with information about them.

== List ==
Cabinets of the Kingdom of Sardinia (1848–1861)
Legislature	Years	Cabinets
I	1848–1849	Balbo, Casati, Alfieri, Perrone, Gioberti
II	1849	Chiodo
III	1849	De Launay
IV	1849–1853	D'Azeglio I, D'Azeglio II, Cavour I
V	1853–1859	Cavour II
VI	1859–1860	La Marmora I
VII	1860–1861	Cavour III

Kingdom of Italy Governments (1861–1946)
#	Government	Term start – Term End	End date	Days in Office	Effective Days
1.	Cavour IV	23 March 1861 – 12 June 1861	6 June 1861	81	75
2.	Ricasoli I	12 June 1861 – 3 March 1862	28 February 1862	264	261
3.	Rattazzi I	3 March 1862 – 8 December 1862	1 December 1862	280	273
4.	Farini	8 December 1862 – 24 March 1863	24 March 1863	106	106
5.	Minghetti I	24 March 1863 – 28 September 1864	23 September 1864	554	549
6.	La Marmora II	28 September 1864 – 31 December 1865	21 December 1865	459	449
7.	La Marmora III	31 December 1865 – 20 June 1866	20 June 1866	171	171
8.	Ricasoli II	20 June 1866 – 10 April 1867	4 April 1867	294	288
9.	Rattazzi II	10 April 1867 – 27 October 1867	19 October 1867	200	192
10.	Menabrea I	27 October 1867 – 5 January 1868	23 December 1867	70	57
11.	Menabrea II	5 January 1868 – 13 May 1869	7 May 1869	494	488
12.	Menabrea III	13 May 1869 – 14 December 1869	22 November 1869	215	193
13.	Lanza	14 December 1869 – 10 July 1873	26 June 1873	1304	1290
14.	Minghetti II	10 July 1873 – 25 March 1876	19 March 1876	989	983
15.	Depretis I	25 March 1876 – 29 December 1877	15 December 1877	644	630
16.	Depretis II	29 December 1877 – 24 March 1878	9 March 1878	85	70
17.	Cairoli I	24 March 1878 – 19 December 1878	12 December 1878	270	263
18.	Depretis III	19 December 1878 – 14 July 1879	3 July 1879	207	196
19.	Cairoli II	14 July 1879 – 25 November 1879	18 November 1879	134	127
20.	Cairoli III	25 November 1879 – 29 May 1881	14 May 1881	551	536
21.	Depretis IV	29 May 1881 – 25 May 1883	22 May 1883	726	723
22.	Depretis V	25 May 1883 – 30 March 1884	20 March 1884	310	300
23.	Depretis VI	30 March 1884 – 29 June 1885	18 June 1885	456	445
24.	Depretis VII	29 June 1885 – 4 April 1887	8 February 1887	644	589
25.	Crispi I	7 August 1887 – 9 March 1889	28 February 1889	580	571
26.	Depretis VIII	4 April 1887 – 7 August 1887	29 July 1887	125	116
27.	Crispi II	9 March 1889 – 9 February 1891	31 January 1891	702	693
28.	Di Rudinì I	9 February 1891 – 15 May 1892	14 April 1892	461	430
29.	Giolitti I	15 May 1892 – 15 December 1893	24 November 1893	579	558
30.	Crispi III	15 December 1893 – 14 June 1894	5 June 1894	181	172
31.	Crispi IV	14 June 1894 – 10 March 1896	5 March 1896	635	630
32.	Di Rudinì II	10 March 1896 – 15 July 1896	11 July 1896	127	123
33.	Di Rudinì III	15 July 1896 – 14 December 1897	6 December 1897	517	509
34.	Di Rudinì IV	14 December 1897 – 1 June 1898	28 May 1898	169	165
35.	Di Rudinì V	1 June 1898 – 30 June 1898	18 June 1898	29	17
36.	Pelloux I	30 June 1898 – 15 May 1899	3 May 1899	319	307
37.	Pelloux II	15 May 1899 – 25 June 1900	18 June 1900	406	399
38.	Saracco	25 June 1900 – 15 February 1901	7 February 1901	235	227
39.	Zanardelli	15 February 1901 – 3 November 1903	21 October 1903	991	978
40.	Giolitti II	3 November 1903 – 16 March 1905	4 March 1905	499	487
41.	Tittoni	16 March 1905 – 28 March 1905	25 March 1905	12	9
42.	Fortis I	28 March 1905 – 24 December 1905	18 December 1905	271	265
43.	Fortis II	24 December 1905 – 8 February 1906	2 February 1906	46	40
44.	Sonnino I	8 February 1906 – 30 May 1906	18 May 1906	111	99
45.	Giolitti III	30 May 1906 – 11 December 1909	3 December 1909	1291	1283
46.	Sonnino II	11 December 1909 – 31 March 1910	21 March 1910	110	100
47.	Luzzatti	31 March 1910 – 30 March 1911	19 March 1911	364	353
48.	Giolitti IV	30 March 1911 – 21 March 1914	10 March 1914	1087	1076
49.	Salandra I	21 March 1914 – 5 November 1914	31 October 1914	229	224
50.	Salandra II	5 November 1914 – 19 June 1916	10 June 1916	592	583
51.	Boselli	19 June 1916 – 30 October 1917	26 October 1917	498	494
52.	Orlando	30 October 1917 – 23 June 1919	19 June 1919	601	597
53.	Nitti I	23 June 1919 – 22 May 1920	12 May 1920	334	324
54.	Nitti II	22 May 1920 – 16 June 1920	9 June 1920	25	18
55.	Giolitti V	16 June 1920 – 4 July 1921	27 June 1921	383	376
56.	Bonomi I	4 July 1921 – 26 February 1922	2 February 1922	237	213
57.	Facta I	26 February 1922 – 1 August 1922	19 July 1922	156	143
58.	Facta II	1 August 1922 – 31 October 1922	27 October 1922	91	87
59.	Mussolini	31 October 1922 – 27 July 1943	25 July 1943	7574	4757
60.	Badoglio I	27 July 1943 – 24 April 1944	17 April 1944	272	265
61.	Badoglio II	24 April 1944 – 18 June 1944	8 June 1944	55	45
62.	Bonomi II	18 June 1944 – 12 December 1944	26 November 1944	177	161
63.	Bonomi III	12 December 1944 – 21 June 1945	12 June 1945	191	182
64.	Parri	21 June 1945 – 10 December 1945	24 November 1945	172	156
65.	De Gasperi I	10 December 1945 – 14 July 1946	1 July 1946	216	203

Post-World War II Italian Governments
Legislature	Government	Prime Minister	Party	Term Dates		Duration (Days)
Kingdom of Italy (transitional constitutional period)	Badoglio I	Pietro Badoglio	Military	25 July 1943	17 April 1944	267
Kingdom of Italy (transitional constitutional period)	Badoglio II	Pietro Badoglio	Military	22 April 1944	8 June 1944	48
Kingdom of Italy (transitional constitutional period)	Bonomi II	Ivanoe Bonomi	PDL-DC-PCI-PLI-PSIUP-PdA	18 June 1944	10 December 1944	175
Kingdom of Italy (transitional constitutional period)	Bonomi III	Ivanoe Bonomi	PDL-DC-PCI-PLI-PSIUP-PdA	12 December 1944	19 June 1945	189
Kingdom of Italy (transitional constitutional period)	Parri	Ferruccio Parri	PdA-DC-PCI-PLI-PSIUP-PDL	21 June 1945	8 December 1945	170
Kingdom of Italy (transitional constitutional period)	De Gasperi I	Alcide De Gasperi	DC-PCI-PLI-PSIUP-PdA-PDL	10 December 1945	1 July 1946	204
Constituent Assembly		Alcide De Gasperi	DC-PCI-PLI-PSIUP-PdA-PDL			
Constituent Assembly	De Gasperi II	Alcide De Gasperi	DC-PCI-PLI-PSIUP-PdA-PDL	13 July 1946	28 January 1947	199
Constituent Assembly	De Gasperi III	Alcide De Gasperi	DC-PCI-PLI-PSIUP-PdA-PDL	2 February 1947	31 May 1947	119
Constituent Assembly	De Gasperi IV	Alcide De Gasperi	DC-PCI-PLI-PSIUP-PdA-PDL	31 May 1947	23 May 1948	358
1st legislature		Alcide De Gasperi	DC-PCI-PLI-PSIUP-PdA-PDL			
1st legislature	De Gasperi V	Alcide De Gasperi	DC-PCI-PLI-PSIUP-PdA-PDL	23 May 1948	14 January 1950	601
1st legislature	De Gasperi VI	Alcide De Gasperi	DC-PCI-PLI-PSIUP-PdA-PDL	27 January 1950	19 July 1951	538
1st legislature	De Gasperi VII	Alcide De Gasperi	DC-PCI-PLI-PSIUP-PdA-PDL	26 July 1951	7 July 1953	712
2nd legislature		Alcide De Gasperi	DC-PCI-PLI-PSIUP-PdA-PDL			
2nd legislature	De Gasperi VIII	Alcide De Gasperi	DC-PCI-PLI-PSIUP-PdA-PDL	16 July 1953	2 August 1953	18
2nd legislature	Pella	Giuseppe Pella	DC-PCI-PLI-PSIUP-PdA-PDL	17 August 1953	12 January 1954	148
2nd legislature	Fanfani I	Amintore Fanfani	DC-PCI-PLI-PSIUP-PdA-PDL	18 January 1954	8 February 1954	22
2nd legislature	Scelba	Mario Scelba	DC-PCI-PLI-PSIUP-PdA-PDL	10 February 1954	2 July 1955	508
2nd legislature	Segni I	Antonio Segni	DC-PCI-PLI-PSIUP-PdA-PDL	6 July 1955	15 May 1957	679
2nd legislature	Zoli	Adone Zoli	DC-PCI-PLI-PSIUP-PdA-PDL	19 May 1957	1 July 1958	408
3rd legislature			DC-PCI-PLI-PSIUP-PdA-PDL			
3rd legislature	Fanfani II	Amintore Fanfani	DC-PCI-PLI-PSIUP-PdA-PDL	1 July 1958	15 February 1959	229
3rd legislature	Segni II	Antonio Segni	DC-PCI-PLI-PSIUP-PdA-PDL	15 February 1959	23 March 1960	403
3rd legislature	Tambroni	Fernando Tambroni	DC-PCI-PLI-PSIUP-PdA-PDL	25 March 1960	26 July 1960	123
3rd legislature	Fanfani III	Amintore Fanfani	DC-PCI-PLI-PSIUP-PdA-PDL	26 July 1960	21 February 1962	575
3rd legislature	Fanfani IV	Amintore Fanfani	DC-PCI-PLI-PSIUP-PdA-PDL	21 February 1962	21 June 1963	485
4th legislature			DC-PCI-PLI-PSIUP-PdA-PDL			
4th legislature	Leone I	Giovanni Leone	DC-PCI-PLI-PSIUP-PdA-PDL	21 June 1963	4 December 1963	166
4th legislature	Moro I	Aldo Moro	DC-PCI-PLI-PSIUP-PdA-PDL	4 December 1963	22 July 1964	231
4th legislature	Moro II	Aldo Moro	DC-PCI-PLI-PSIUP-PdA-PDL	22 July 1964	23 February 1966	581
4th legislature	Moro III	Aldo Moro	DC-PCI-PLI-PSIUP-PdA-PDL	23 February 1966	24 June 1968	853
5th legislature			DC-PCI-PLI-PSIUP-PdA-PDL			
5th legislature	Leone II	Giovanni Leone	DC-PCI-PLI-PSIUP-PdA-PDL	24 June 1968	12 December 1968	171
5th legislature	Rumor I	Mariano Rumor	DC-PCI-PLI-PSIUP-PdA-PDL	12 December 1968	8 August 1969	239
5th legislature	Rumor II	Mariano Rumor	DC-PCI-PLI-PSIUP-PdA-PDL	8 August 1969	27 March 1970	231
5th legislature	Rumor III	Mariano Rumor	DC-PCI-PLI-PSIUP-PdA-PDL	27 March 1970	6 August 1970	132
5th legislature	Colombo	Emilio Colombo	DC-PCI-PLI-PSIUP-PdA-PDL	6 August 1970	17 February 1972	560
5th legislature	Andreotti I	Giulio Andreotti	DC-PCI-PLI-PSIUP-PdA-PDL	17 February 1972	26 July 1972	160
6th legislature		Giulio Andreotti	DC-PCI-PLI-PSIUP-PdA-PDL			
6th legislature	Andreotti II	Giulio Andreotti	DC-PCI-PLI-PSIUP-PdA-PDL	26 July 1972	7 July 1973	346
6th legislature	Rumor IV	Mariano Rumor	DC-PCI-PLI-PSIUP-PdA-PDL	7 July 1973	14 March 1974	250
6th legislature	Rumor V	Mariano Rumor	DC-PCI-PLI-PSIUP-PdA-PDL	14 March 1974	23 November 1974	254
6th legislature	Moro IV	Aldo Moro	DC-PCI-PLI-PSIUP-PdA-PDL	23 November 1974	12 February 1976	446
6th legislature	Moro V	Aldo Moro	DC-PCI-PLI-PSIUP-PdA-PDL	12 February 1976	29 July 1976	168
7th legislature			DC-PCI-PLI-PSIUP-PdA-PDL			
7th legislature	Andreotti III	Giulio Andreotti	DC-PCI-PLI-PSIUP-PdA-PDL	29 July 1976	11 March 1978	589
7th legislature	Andreotti IV	Giulio Andreotti	DC-PCI-PLI-PSIUP-PdA-PDL	11 March 1978	20 March 1979	374
7th legislature	Andreotti V	Giulio Andreotti	DC-PCI-PLI-PSIUP-PdA-PDL	20 March 1979	4 August 1979	137
8th legislature			DC-PCI-PLI-PSIUP-PdA-PDL			
8th legislature	Cossiga I	Francesco Cossiga	DC-PCI-PLI-PSIUP-PdA-PDL	4 August 1979	4 April 1980	244
8th legislature	Cossiga II	Francesco Cossiga	DC-PCI-PLI-PSIUP-PdA-PDL	4 April 1980	18 October 1980	197
8th legislature	Forlani	Arnaldo Forlani	DC-PCI-PLI-PSIUP-PdA-PDL	18 October 1980	28 June 1981	253
8th legislature	Spadolini I	Giovanni Spadolini	PRI	28 June 1981	23 August 1982	421
8th legislature	Spadolini II	Giovanni Spadolini	PRI	23 August 1982	1 December 1982	100
8th legislature	Fanfani V	Amintore Fanfani	DC-PSI-PSDI-PLI	1 December 1982	4 August 1983	246
9th legislature
9th legislature	Craxi I	Bettino Craxi	PSI-DC-PSDI-PRI-PLI	4 August 1983	1 August 1986	1092
9th legislature	Craxi II	Bettino Craxi	PSI-DC-PSDI-PRI-PLI	1 August 1986	17 April 1987	259
9th legislature	Fanfani VI	Amintore Fanfani	DC	17 April 1987	28 July 1987	102
10th legislature			DC			
10th legislature	Goria	Giovanni Goria	DC	28 July 1987	13 April 1988	259
10th legislature	De Mita	Ciriaco De Mita	DC	13 April 1988	22 July 1989	465
10th legislature	Andreotti VI	Giulio Andreotti	DC	22 July 1989	12 April 1991	629
10th legislature	Andreotti VII	Giulio Andreotti	DC	12 April 1991	24 April 1992	378
11th legislature
11th legislature	Amato I	Giuliano Amato	PSI	28 June 1992	28 April 1993	304
11th legislature	Ciampi	Carlo Azeglio Ciampi	Independent (Coalition DC - PSI - PDS - PRI)	28 April 1993	10 May 1994	377
12th legislature
12th legislature	Berlusconi I	Silvio Berlusconi	FI-MSI-LN-UdC-CCD-FLD	10 May 1994	17 January 1995	252
12th legislature	Dini	Lamberto Dini	Independent (External support PDS - PPI - LN)	17 January 1995	17 May 1996	486
13th legislature
13th legislature	Prodi I	Romano Prodi	L'Ulivo	17 May 1996	21 October 1998	887
13th legislature	D'Alema I	Massimo D'Alema	L'Ulivo	21 October 1998	22 December 1999	427
13th legislature	D'Alema II	Massimo D'Alema	L'Ulivo	22 December 1999	25 April 2000	125
13th legislature	Amato II	Giuliano Amato	L'Ulivo	25 April 2000	11 June 2001	412
14th legislature
14th legislature	Berlusconi II	Silvio Berlusconi	FI-LN-AN-CCD-CDU	11 June 2001	23 April 2005	1412
14th legislature	Berlusconi III	Silvio Berlusconi	FI-LN-AN-CCD-CDU	23 April 2005	17 May 2006	389
15th legislature
15th legislature	Prodi II	Romano Prodi	L'Ulivo	17 May 2006	8 May 2008	722
16th legislature
16th legislature	Berlusconi IV	Silvio Berlusconi	PdL-LN	8 May 2008	16 November 2011	1288
16th legislature	Monti	Mario Monti	Independent (External support PdL - PD - UdC)	16 November 2011	28 April 2013	530
17th legislature
17th legislature	Letta	Enrico Letta	PD (Coalition PD - PdL - SC - UdC)	28 April 2013	22 February 2014	300
17th legislature	Renzi	Matteo Renzi	PD (Coalition PD - NCD - SC - UdC - PSI)	22 February 2014	12 December 2016	1024
17th legislature	Gentiloni	Paolo Gentiloni	PD (Coalition PD - AP - CpE - PSI)	12 December 2016	1 June 2018	536
18th legislature	Conte I	Giuseppe Conte	Independent (Coalition M5S - Lega)	1 June 2018	5 September 2019	461
18th legislature	Conte II	Giuseppe Conte	Independent (Coalition M5S - PD - IV - LeU)	5 September 2019	13 February 2021	526
18th legislature	Draghi	Mario Draghi	Independent (Coalition M5S - Lega - PD - IV - LeU - FI)	13 February 2021	22 October 2022	616
19th legislature	Meloni	Giorgia Meloni	FdI-Lega-FI	22 October 2022	Incumbent	1491

== Statistics ==
- Average government duration: 361 days
- Number of governments since the end of World War II: 70 (64 since the proclamation of the Republic in 1946)
- Number of Prime Ministers since the end of World War II: 32 (29 since the proclamation of the Republic in 1946)

== Records ==
- Longest government: Meloni (3 years, 10 months and 13 days).
- Shortest government: De Gasperi VIII (seventeen days).
- Most terms as head of government: Alcide De Gasperi (eight, all consecutive).
- Longest cumulative term as head of government: Alcide De Gasperi (seven years, ten months, and twenty-two days, or 2,792 days).
- Longest period without a new Prime Minister: eleven years and seven months (from the investiture of Massimo D'Alema to that of Mario Monti).
- Party with the longest continuous tenure as head of government: Christian Democracy (thirty-five years, six months, and eighteen days).

== Main Prime Ministers ==
Only those Prime Ministers who have led at least three governments are listed (party and number of terms in parentheses)

- Alcide De Gasperi (DC, eight)
- Giulio Andreotti (DC, seven)
- Amintore Fanfani (DC, six)
- Aldo Moro (DC, five)
- Mariano Rumor (DC, five)
- Silvio Berlusconi (FI - PdL, four)

These six men alone account for thirty-five of the sixty-two Prime Ministerial terms since the end of the war. It is also worth noting that none of them come from the centre-left (although all those from its ranks have served two terms, before the current legislature).

== See also ==
- Government of Italy
