= Pella government =

8th government of the Italian Republic

Pella Cabinet
- 8th Cabinet of Italy

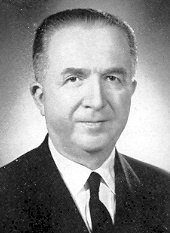
- Date formed: 17 August 1953
- Date dissolved: 19 January 1954

People and organisations
- Head of state: Luigi Einaudi
- Head of government: Giuseppe Pella
- Total no. of members: 18
- Member party: Christian Democracy
- Status in legislature: One-party government

History
- Legislature term: Legislature II (1953–1958)
- Predecessor: De Gasperi VIII Cabinet
- Successor: Fanfani I Cabinet

The Pella government was the 8th government of the Italian Republic. It held office from 17 August 1953 to 18 January 1954, for a total of 154 days (or 5 months and 1 day). President Luigi Einaudi invited Giuseppe Pella to form an interim cabinet following the fall of the Eighth De Gasperi government in a confidence vote, for the purpose of passing the budget.

== Government parties ==
The Pella cabinet was a one-party government, composed only of members of Christian Democracy (DC).

== Composition ==
| Office | Name | Party | Term |
|---|---|---|---|
| Prime Minister | Giuseppe Pella | DC | 17 August 1953–19 January 1954 |
| Minister of Foreign Affairs | Giuseppe Pella (ad interim) | DC | 17 August 1953–19 January 1954 |
| Minister of the Interior | Amintore Fanfani | DC | 17 August 1953–19 January 1954 |
| Minister of Grace and Justice | Antonio Azara | DC | 17 August 1953–19 January 1954 |
| Minister of Budget | Giuseppe Pella (ad interim) | DC | 17 August 1953–19 January 1954 |
| Minister of Finance | Ezio Vanoni | DC | 17 August 1953–19 January 1954 |
| Minister of Treasury | Silvio Gava | DC | 17 August 1953–19 January 1954 |
| Minister of Defence | Paolo Emilio Taviani | DC | 17 August 1953–19 January 1954 |
| Minister of Public Education | Antonio Segni | DC | 17 August 1953–19 January 1954 |
| Minister of Public Works | Umberto Merlin | DC | 17 August 1953–19 January 1954 |
| Minister of Agriculture and Forests | Rocco Salomone | DC | 17 August 1953–19 January 1954 |
| Minister of Transport | Bernardo Mattarella | DC | 17 August 1953–19 January 1954 |
| Minister of Post and Telecommunications | Modesto Panetti | DC | 17 August 1953–19 January 1954 |
| Minister of Industry and Commerce | Piero Malvestiti | DC | 17 August 1953–19 January 1954 |
| Minister of Foreign Trade | Costantino Bresciani Turroni | DC | 17 August 1953–19 January 1954 |
| Minister of Merchant Navy | Fernando Tambroni | DC | 17 August 1953–19 January 1954 |
| Minister of Labour and Social Security | Leopoldo Rubinacci | DC | 17 August 1953–19 January 1954 |
| Minister for the Fund for the South (without portfolio) | Pietro Campilli | DC | 17 August 1953–19 January 1954 |
| Minister for Public Administration Reform (without portfolio) | Salvatore Scoca | DC | 17 August 1953–19 January 1954 |
| Secretary of the Council of Ministers | Giulio Andreotti | DC | 17 August 1953–19 January 1954 |
