= Legislature II of Italy =

2nd legislature of the Italian Republic (1953–1958)

Legislature II of Italy II legislatura della Repubblica Italiana
- 2nd legislature

Type
- Type: bicameral
- Houses: Chamber of Deputies; Senate of the Republic

History
- Founded: 25 June 1953
- Disbanded: 11 June 1958 (4 years, 351 days)
- Preceded by: I Legislature
- Succeeded by: III Legislature

Leadership
- President of the Senate: Cesare Merzagora, Ind since 25 June 1953
- President of the Chamber of Deputies: Giovanni Gronchi, DC (25 June 1953 – 29 April 1955); Giovanni Leone, DC (10 May 1955 – 11 June 1958)

Structure
- Seats: 590 (C); 237 (S)
- Chamber of Deputies political groups: DC (263); PCI (143); PSI (75); PNM (40); MSI (29); PSDI (19); PLI (14); PRI (5); SVP (3)
- Senate political groups: DC (112); PCI (52); PSI (26); PNM (14); MSI (9); PSDI (4); PLI (3); SVP (2); ADN (1); Others (15)

Elections
- Chamber of Deputies voting system: Proportional with majority bonus
- Senate voting system: Proportional
- Last general election: 7 June 1953

Meeting place
- Palazzo Montecitorio, Rome (C)
- Palazzo Madama, Rome (S)

Website
- Second Legislature – Chamber of Deputies; Second Legislature – Senate

Constitution
- Constitution of Italy

The Legislature II of Italy (Italian: II Legislatura della Repubblica Italiana) was the 2nd legislature of the Italian Republic, and lasted from 25 June 1953 until 11 June 1958. Its composition was the one resulting from the general election of 7 June 1953.

== Main chronology ==
The election was characterized by changes in the electoral law. Even if the general structure remained uncorrupted, the government introduced a superbonus of two thirds of seats in the Chamber of Deputies for the coalition which would obtain at-large the absolute majority of votes. The change was hugely opposed by the opposition parties as well as the smaller DC coalition partners, which had no realistic chances of success. The new law was called Scam Law by its detractors, including some dissidents of minor government parties who founded special opposition groups to deny the artificial landslide to the DC.

The complaint campaign of the oppositions against the Scam Law reached its goal. The Centrist coalition (DC, PSDI, PLI, PRI) won 49.9% of the national vote, coming just a few thousand votes short of the threshold for a two-thirds majority. Instead, the election resulted in an ordinary proportional distribution of the seats. Minor dissident parties resulted determinant for the final result, especially the short-lived National Democratic Alliance (ADN). Technically, the government won the election, with a clear working majority of seats in both houses. But frustration at the failure to garner the expected supermajority caused big problems for the leading coalition. De Gasperi was forced to resign and the legislature continued with many weak governments, with minor parties refusing institutional responsibilities. Because of the extreme governmental instability and the consequent absence of considerable reforms proposed by the government, the legislature was later defined by some historians "the lost legislature".

After De Gasperi lost the support of the Parliament, Giuseppe Pella rose to power, but fell after five months only, following strong disputes about the status of the Free Territory of Trieste which Pella was claiming. Amintore Fanfani not receiving a vote of confidence, Mario Scelba and Antonio Segni followed with more traditional centrist coalitions supported by PSDI and PLI: under the administration of the first one, the problem of Trieste was closed ceding Koper to Yugoslavia. The parliamentary term was closed by the minority government chaired by Adone Zoli, finishing a legislature which hugely weakened the office of the Prime Minister, held by six different rulers. Zoli himself governed for more than one year as a care-taker Prime Minister, after having resigned when the neo-fascist MSI resulted decisive in the government's investiture confidence vote. Zoli remained in office after being invited by President Gronchi to govern until the natural dissolution of the legislature in 1958.

=== Presidential election ===
On 28 April 1955 the Parliament met to elect the second President of Italy. On 29 April 1955 the President of the Chamber of Deputies Giovanni Gronchi was elected on the fourth ballot with 658 votes out of 843.

== Government ==
Prime Minister	Party	Term of office		Government	Composition
Prime Minister	Party	Took office	Left office	Government	Composition
Alcide De Gasperi (1881–1954)	Christian Democracy	16 July 1953	17 August 1953	De Gasperi VIII	DC
Giuseppe Pella (1902–1981)	Christian Democracy	17 August 1953	18 January 1954	Pella	DC
Amintore Fanfani (1908–1999)	Christian Democracy	18 January 1954	10 February 1954	Fanfani I	DC
Mario Scelba (1901–1991)	Christian Democracy	10 February 1954	6 July 1955	Scelba	DC • PLI • PSDI (Centrism)
Antonio Segni (1891–1972)	Christian Democracy	6 July 1955	19 May 1957	Segni I	DC • PLI • PSDI (Centrism)
Adone Zoli (1887–1960)	Christian Democracy	19 May 1957	1 July 1958	Zoli	DC

Confidence votes

=== De Gasperi VIII Cabinet ===
28 July 1953 Investiture votes for De Gasperi VIII Cabinet
House of Parliament	Vote	Parties	Votes
Chamber of Deputies (Voting: 545 of 590, Majority: 273)	Yes	DC	263 / 545
Chamber of Deputies (Voting: 545 of 590, Majority: 273)	No	PCI, PSI, PRI, MSI, PNM	282 / 545

No confidence granted.

=== Pella Cabinet ===
22–24 August 1953 Investiture votes for Pella Cabinet
House of Parliament	Vote	Parties	Votes
Senate of the Republic (Voting: 236 of 237, Majority: 119)	Yes	DC, PNM, PLI, SVP	140 / 236
Senate of the Republic (Voting: 236 of 237, Majority: 119)	No	PCI, PSI	86 / 236
Senate of the Republic (Voting: 236 of 237, Majority: 119)	Abstention	MSI, PSDI	10 / 236
Chamber of Deputies (Voting: 530 of 590, Majority: 266)	Yes	DC, PNM, PLI, SVP	315 / 530
Chamber of Deputies (Voting: 530 of 590, Majority: 266)	No	PCI, PSI, PLI, MSI, PRI	215 / 530

=== Fanfani I Cabinet ===
30 January 1954 Investiture votes for Fanfani I Cabinet
House of Parliament	Vote	Parties	Votes
Chamber of Deputies (Voting: 563 of 590, Majority: 282)	Yes	DC	260 / 563
Chamber of Deputies (Voting: 563 of 590, Majority: 282)	No	PCI, PSI, PRI, MSI, PNM, PLI, PSDI	303 / 563

No confidence granted.

=== Scelba Cabinet ===
26 February–10 March 1954 Investiture votes for Scelba Cabinet
House of Parliament	Vote	Parties	Votes
Senate of the Republic (Voting: 236 of 237, Majority: 118)	Yes	DC, PLI, PSDI, SVP	123 / 236
Senate of the Republic (Voting: 236 of 237, Majority: 118)	No	PCI, PSI, PNM, MSI	110 / 235
Senate of the Republic (Voting: 236 of 237, Majority: 118)	Abstention	Others	2 / 235
Chamber of Deputies (Voting: 583 of 590, Majority: 292)	Yes	DC, PLI, PRI, PSDI, SVP	300 / 583
Chamber of Deputies (Voting: 583 of 590, Majority: 292)	No	PCI, PSI, PNM, MSI	283 / 583

=== Segni I Cabinet ===
18–22 July 1955 Investiture votes for Segni Cabinet
House of Parliament	Vote	Parties	Votes
Chamber of Deputies (Voting: 558 of 590, Majority: 280)	Yes	DC, PLI, PRI, PSDI, SVP	293 / 558
Chamber of Deputies (Voting: 558 of 590, Majority: 280)	No	PCI, PSI, PNM, MSI	265 / 558
Senate of the Republic (Voting: 224 of 237, Majority: 113)	Yes	DC, PLI, PSDI, SVP	121 / 224
Senate of the Republic (Voting: 224 of 237, Majority: 113)	No	PCI, PSI, PNM, MSI	100 / 224
Senate of the Republic (Voting: 224 of 237, Majority: 113)	Abstention	Others	3 / 224

=== Zoli Cabinet ===
4–7 June 1957 Investiture votes for Zoli Cabinet
House of Parliament	Vote	Parties	Votes
Senate of the Republic (Voting: 229 of 237, Majority: 115)	Yes	DC, PNM, MSI	132 / 229
Senate of the Republic (Voting: 229 of 237, Majority: 115)	No	PCI, PSI, PLI, PSDI	93 / 229
Senate of the Republic (Voting: 229 of 237, Majority: 115)	Abstention	Others	4 / 229
Chamber of Deputies (Voting: 560 of 590, Majority: 281)	Yes	DC, PNM, MSI	305 / 560
Chamber of Deputies (Voting: 560 of 590, Majority: 281)	No	PCI, PSI, PLI, PSDI	255 / 560

== Parliamentary composition ==
=== Chamber of Deputies ===
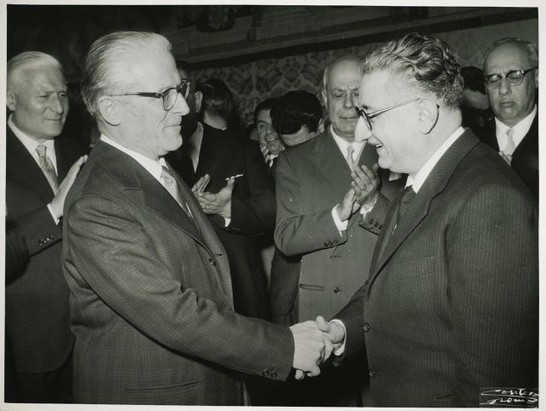
Presidents of the Chamber of Deputies: Giovanni Gronchi (1953–1955) and Giovanni Leone (1955–1958)

- President:
  - Giovanni Gronchi (DC), elected on 25 June 1953 and resigned on 29 April 1955;
  - Giovanni Leone (DC), elected on 10 May 1955.
- Vice Presidents: Giovanni Leone (DC, until 10 May 1955), Gaetano Martino (PLI, until 10 February 1954), Cino Macrelli (Ind, from 5 March 1954), Edoardo D'Onofrio (PCI), Ferdinando Targetti (PSI), Giuseppe Rapelli (DC, from 27 September 1955)

Parliamentary groups in the Chamber of Deputies
Initial composition (25 June 1953)		Final composition (11 June 1958)		
Parliamentary group	Seats	Parliamentary group	Seats	Change
Christian Democracy	263	Christian Democracy	260	▼3
Italian Communist Party	143	Italian Communist Party	142	▼1
Italian Socialist Party	75	Italian Socialist Party	75	Steady
Monarchist National Party	40	Monarchist National Party	22	▼1
Monarchist National Party	40	People's Monarchist Party	17	▼1
Italian Social Movement	29	Italian Social Movement	23	▼6
Italian Democratic Socialist Party	19	Italian Democratic Socialist Party	18	▼1
Italian Liberal Party	13	Italian Liberal Party	14	▲1
Mixed	8	Mixed	19	▲11
Italian Republican Party	5	Italian Republican Party	5	Steady
Südtiroler Volkspartei	3	Südtiroler Volkspartei	3	Steady
		Independents – Non inscrits	11	▲11
Total seats	590	Total seats	590	Steady

=== Senate of the Republic ===
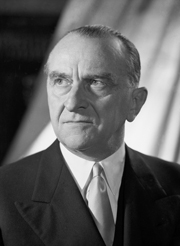
Cesare Merzagora, President of the Senate

- President: Cesare Merzagora (Ind), elected on 25 June 1953
- Vice Presidents: Michele De Pietro (DC, until 17 January 1954 and then from 4 July 1957), Giorgio Bo (DC, until 18 May 1957), Mauro Scoccimarro (PCI), Enrico Molé (PSDI), Mario Cingolani (DC, from 24 February 1954)

Parliamentary groups in the Senate of the Republic
Initial composition (25 June 1953)		Final composition (11 June 1958)		
Parliamentary group	Seats	Parliamentary group	Seats	Change
Christian Democracy	112	Christian Democracy	110	▼2
Italian Communist Party	52	Italian Communist Party	49	▼3
Italian Socialist Party	26	Italian Socialist Party	27	▲1
Monarchist National Party	14	Monarchist National Party	15	▲1
Italian Social Movement	9	Italian Social Movement	9	Steady
Social Democratic–Liberal	8	Social Democratic–Liberal	10	▲2
Mixed	15	Mixed	16	▲1
Südtiroler Volkspartei	2	Südtiroler Volkspartei	2	Steady
Independents – Non inscrits	13	Independents – Non inscrits	14	▲1
Total seats	237	Total seats	237	Steady

==== Senators for Life ====
Senator	Motivation	Appointed by	From	Till
Enrico De Nicola	Former President of Italy	ex officio	Previous legislature	Next legislature
Pietro Canonica	Merits in the artistic field	President Luigi Einaudi	Previous legislature	Next legislature
Gaetano De Sanctis	Merits in the social and literary field	President Luigi Einaudi	Previous legislature	9 April 1957 (deceased)
Pasquale Jannaccone	Merits in the social field	President Luigi Einaudi	Previous legislature	Next legislature
Luigi Sturzo	Merits in the social field	President Luigi Einaudi	Previous legislature	Next legislature
Umberto Zanotti Bianco	Merits in the artistic and social field	President Luigi Einaudi	Previous legislature	Next legislature
Luigi Einaudi	Former President of Italy	ex officio	11 May 1955	Next legislature
Giuseppe Paratore	Merits in the social field	President Giovanni Gronchi	9 November 1957	Next legislature
