= Seventh De Gasperi government =

6th government of the Italian Republic

De Gasperi VII Cabinet
- 6th Cabinet of Italy

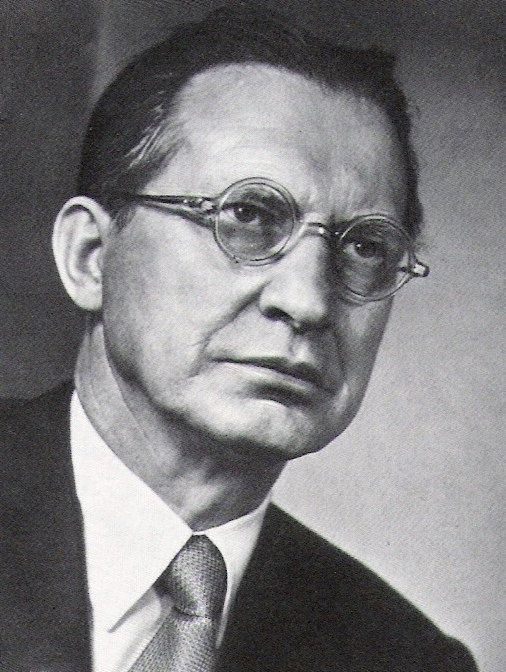
- Date formed: 26 July 1951
- Date dissolved: 16 July 1953

People and organisations
- Head of state: Luigi Einaudi
- Head of government: Alcide De Gasperi
- Member parties: DC, PRI
- Status in legislature: Coalition government

History
- Outgoing election: 1953 election
- Legislature term: Legislature I (1948–1953)
- Predecessor: De Gasperi VI Cabinet
- Successor: De Gasperi VIII Cabinet

The seventh De Gasperi government held office in the Italian Republic from 26 July 1951 until 16 July 1953, a total of 721 days, or 1 year, 11 months and 20 days.

== Party breakdown ==
- Christian Democracy (DC): prime minister, deputy prime minister, 12 ministers, 33 undersecretaries
- Italian Republican Party (PRI): 3 ministers, 3 undersecretaries

== Composition ==
Office	Name	Party	Term
Prime Minister	Alcide De Gasperi	DC	26 July 1951–16 July 1953
Deputy Prime Minister	Attilio Piccioni	DC	26 July 1951–16 July 1953
Minister of Foreign Affairs	Alcide De Gasperi (ad interim)	DC	26 July 1951–16 July 1953
Minister of the Interior	Mario Scelba	DC	26 July 1951–16 July 1953
Minister of Italian Africa	Alcide De Gasperi (ad interim)	DC	26 July 1951–16 July 1953
Minister of Grace and Justice	Adone Zoli	DC	26 July 1951–16 July 1953
Minister of Budget	Giuseppe Pella	DC	26 July 1951–16 July 1953
Minister of Finance	Ezio Vanoni	DC	26 July 1951–16 July 1953
Minister of Treasury	Ezio Vanoni (ad interim)	DC	26 July 1951–2 February 1952
Minister of Treasury	Giuseppe Pella (ad interim)	DC	2 February 1952–16 July 1953
Minister of Defence	Randolfo Pacciardi	PRI	26 July 1951–16 July 1953
Minister of Public Education	Antonio Segni	DC	26 July 1951–16 July 1953
Minister of Public Works	Salvatore Aldisio	DC	26 July 1951–16 July 1953
Minister of Agriculture and Forests	Amintore Fanfani	DC	26 July 1951–16 July 1953
Minister of Transport	Piero Malvestiti	DC	26 July 1951–16 July 1953
Minister of Post and Telecommunications	Giuseppe Spataro	DC	26 July 1951–16 July 1953
Minister of Industry and Commerce	Pietro Campilli	DC	26 July 1951–16 July 1953
Minister of Foreign Trade	Ugo La Malfa	PRI	26 July 1951–16 July 1953
Minister of Merchant Navy	Paolo Cappa	DC	26 July 1951–16 July 1953
Minister of Labour and Social Security	Leopoldo Rubinacci	DC	26 July 1951–16 July 1953
Minister of European Affairs (without portfolio)	Carlo Sforza	PRI	26 July 1951–16 July 1953
Secretary of the Council of Ministers	Giulio Andreotti	DC	26 July 1951–16 July 1953
