= Eighth De Gasperi government =

7th government of the Italian Republic

De Gasperi VIII Cabinet
- 7th Cabinet of Italy

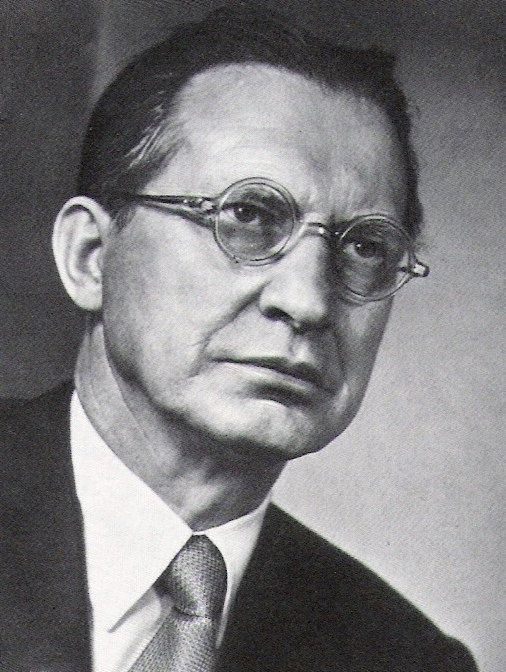
- Former Prime Minister De Gasperi
- Date formed: 16 July 1953
- Date dissolved: 17 August 1953

People and organisations
- Head of state: Luigi Einaudi
- Head of government: Alcide De Gasperi
- No. of ministers: 17
- Member party: Christian Democracy
- Status in legislature: One-party government

History
- Election: 1953 election
- Legislature term: Legislature II (1953–1958)
- Predecessor: De Gasperi VII Cabinet
- Successor: Pella Cabinet

The eighth De Gasperi government held office in the Italian Republic from 16 July to 17 August 1953, a total of just 32 days. Formed in the aftermath of the 1953 Italian general election, which was controversial due to the Scam Law. It was the first government of the Italian Republic to fall at its inaugural parliamentary vote of confidence, and thus it is one of the most short-lived governments in Italian history, having been submitted to Parliament by President Luigi Einaudi.

== Composition ==
Office	Name	Party	Term
Prime Minister	Alcide De Gasperi	DC	16 July 1953–17 August 1953
Deputy Prime Minister	Attilio Piccioni	DC	16 July 1953–17 August 1953
Minister of Foreign Affairs	Alcide De Gasperi (ad interim)	DC	16 July 1953–17 August 1953
Minister of the Interior	Amintore Fanfani	DC	16 July 1953–17 August 1953
Minister of Grace and Justice	Guido Gonella	DC	16 July 1953–17 August 1953
Minister of Budget	Giuseppe Pella	DC	16 July 1953–17 August 1953
Minister of Finance	Ezio Vanoni	DC	16 July 1953–17 August 1953
Minister of Treasury	Giuseppe Pella (ad interim)	DC	16 July 1953–17 August 1953
Minister of Defence	Giuseppe Codacci Pisanelli	DC	16 July 1953–17 August 1953
Minister of Public Education	Giuseppe Bettiol	DC	16 July 1953–17 August 1953
Minister of Public Works	Giuseppe Spataro	DC	16 July 1953–17 August 1953
Minister of Agriculture and Forests	Rocco Salomone	DC	16 July 1953–17 August 1953
Minister of Transport	Giuseppe Togni	DC	16 July 1953–17 August 1953
Minister of Post and Telecommunications	Umberto Merlin	DC	16 July 1953–17 August 1953
Minister of Industry and Commerce	Silvio Gava	DC	16 July 1953–17 August 1953
Minister of Foreign Trade	Paolo Emilio Taviani	DC	16 July 1953–17 August 1953
Minister of Merchant Navy	Bernardo Mattarella	DC	16 July 1953–17 August 1953
Minister of Labour and Social Security	Leopoldo Rubinacci	DC	16 July 1953–17 August 1953
Minister for the Fund for the South (without portfolio)	Pietro Campilli	DC	16 July 1953–17 August 1953
Secretary of the Council of Ministers	Giulio Andreotti	DC	16 July 1953–17 August 1953
