= Fourth De Gasperi government =

3rd government of the Italian Republic

De Gasperi IV Cabinet
- 3rd Cabinet of Italy

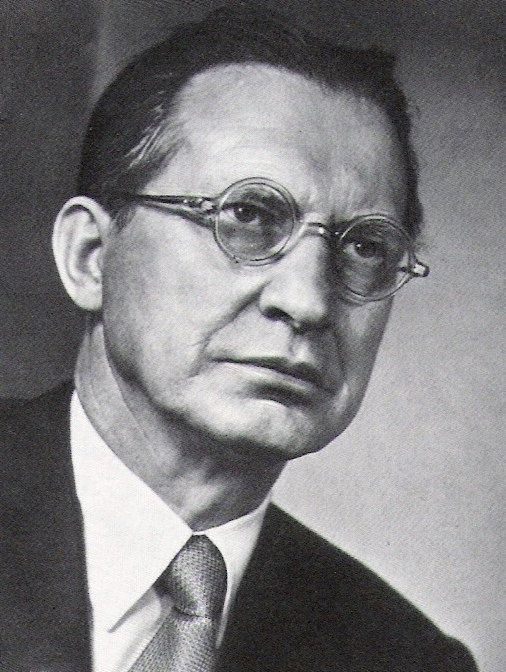
- Date formed: 31 May 1947
- Date dissolved: 24 May 1948

People and organisations
- Head of state: Enrico De Nicola; Luigi Einaudi
- Head of government: Alcide De Gasperi
- No. of ministers: 17 (incl. PM)
- Total no. of members: 20 (incl. PM)
- Member parties: DC, PSLI, PLI, PRI
- Status in legislature: Coalition government
- Opposition parties: PCI, PSI, FUQ, BNL

History
- Outgoing election: 1948 election
- Legislature term: Constituent Legislature (1946–1948)
- Predecessor: De Gasperi III Cabinet
- Successor: De Gasperi V Cabinet

The fourth De Gasperi government held office in the Italian Republic from 31 May 1947 to 23 May 1948, a total of 358 days, or 11 months and 22 days.

== Party breakdown ==
=== Beginning of term ===
- Christian Democracy (DC): prime minister, 11 ministers, 7 undersecretaries
- Italian Liberal Party (PLI): 2 ministers (incl. 1 deputy prime minister)
- Independents: 3 ministers

=== End of term ===
- Christian Democracy (DC): prime minister, 9 ministers, 10 undersecretaries
- Socialist Party of Italian Workers (PSLI): 1 deputy prime minister, 2 ministers, 3 undersecretaries
- Italian Liberal Party (PLI): 2 ministers (incl. 1 deputy prime minister), 3 undersecretaries
- Italian Republican Party (PRI): 1 deputy prime minister, 1 minister, 2 undersecretaries
- Independent: 3 ministers

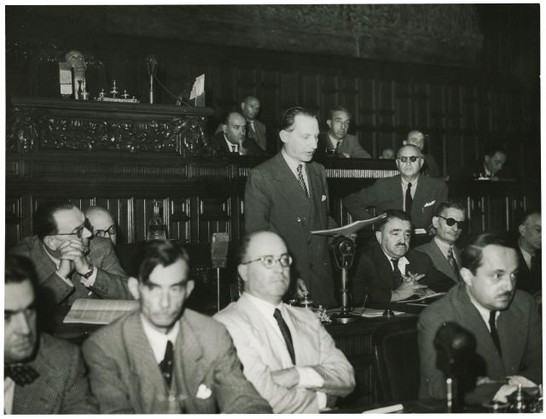
Speech by Prime Minister Alcide De Gasperi in the Chamber of Deputies.

== Composition ==
Office	Name	Party	Term
Prime Minister	Alcide De Gasperi	DC	31 May 1947–24 May 1948
Deputy Prime Minister	Luigi Einaudi	PLI	31 May 1947–24 May 1948
Deputy Prime Minister	Giuseppe Saragat	PSLI	15 December 1947–24 May 1948
Deputy Prime Minister	Randolfo Pacciardi	PRI	15 December 1947–24 May 1948
Minister of Foreign Affairs	Carlo Sforza	Independent	31 May 1947–24 May 1948
Minister of the Interior	Mario Scelba	DC	31 May 1947–24 May 1948
Minister of Italian Africa	Alcide De Gasperi (ad interim)	DC	31 May 1947–24 May 1948
Minister of Grace and Justice	Giuseppe Grassi	PLI	31 May 1947–24 May 1948
Minister of Budget	Luigi Einaudi	PLI	6 June 1947–24 May 1948
Minister of Finance	Luigi Einaudi	PLI	31 May 1947–6 June 1947
Minister of Finance	Giuseppe Pella	DC	6 June 1947–24 May 1948
Minister of Treasury	Gustavo Del Vecchio	Independent	31 May 1947–24 May 1948
Minister of Defence	Mario Cingolani	DC	31 May 1947–15 December 1947
Minister of Defence	Cipriano Facchinetti	PRI	15 December 1947–24 May 1948
Minister of Public Education	Guido Gonella	DC	31 May 1947–24 May 1948
Minister of Public Works	Umberto Tupini	DC	31 May 1947–24 May 1948
Minister of Agriculture and Forests	Antonio Segni	DC	31 May 1947–24 May 1948
Minister of Transport	Guido Corbellini	DC	31 May 1947–24 May 1948
Minister of Post and Telecommunications	Umberto Merlin	DC	31 May 1947–15 December 1947
Minister of Post and Telecommunications	Ludovico D'Aragona	PSLI	15 December 1947–24 May 1948
Minister of Industry and Commerce	Giuseppe Togni	DC	31 May 1947–15 December 1947
Minister of Industry and Commerce	Roberto Tremelloni	PSLI	15 December 1947–24 May 1948
Minister of Foreign Trade	Cesare Merzagora	Independent	31 May 1947–24 May 1948
Minister of Merchant Navy	Paolo Cappa	DC	31 May 1947–24 May 1948
Minister of Labour and Social Security	Amintore Fanfani	DC	31 May 1947–24 May 1948
Minister for the Coordination of Economic Policies (without portfolio)	Giuseppe Togni	DC	15 December 1947–24 May 1948
Secretary of the Council of Ministers	Giulio Andreotti	DC	31 May 1947–24 May 1948
