= Minister of the Treasury (Italy) =

Ministry in the Cabinet of Italy

This is a list of Italian ministers of the treasury, from 1946 to present.

== List of ministers of the treasury ==
Parties

- 1946-1994:

Liberal Party Christian Democracy Democratic Socialist Party Republican Party Socialist Party Independent

- Since 1994:

The Olive Tree Democrats of the Left Independent

Governments

Centrist coalition Centre-right coalition Centre-left coalition Mixed coalition

Name (Born–Died)	Portrait	Term of office		Political Party	Government
Minister of the Treasury
Epicarmo Corbino (1890–1984)		14 July 1946	18 September 1946	Italian Liberal Party	De Gasperi II
Giovanni Battista Bertone (1874–1969)		18 September 1946	2 February 1947	Christian Democracy	De Gasperi II
Minister of the Treasury and Finance
Pietro Campilli (1891–1974)		2 February 1947	31 May 1947	Christian Democracy	De Gasperi III
Luigi Einaudi (1874–1961)		31 May 1947	6 June 1947	Italian Liberal Party	De Gasperi III
Minister of the Treasury
Gustavo Del Vecchio (1883–1972)		6 June 1947	24 May 1948	Independent	De Gasperi IV
Giuseppe Pella (1902–1981)		24 May 1948	26 July 1951	Christian Democracy	De Gasperi V·VI
Ezio Vanoni (1903–1956)		26 July 1951	2 February 1952	Christian Democracy	De Gasperi VII
Giuseppe Pella (1902–1981)		2 February 1952	17 August 1953	Christian Democracy	De Gasperi VII·VIII
Silvio Gava (1901–1999)		17 August 1953	31 January 1956	Christian Democracy	Pella; Fanfani I Scelba; Segni I
Ezio Vanoni (1903–1956)		31 January 1956	16 February 1956	Christian Democracy	Segni I
Giuseppe Medici (1907–2000)		16 February 1956	1 July 1958	Christian Democracy	Segni I Zoli
Giulio Andreotti (1919–2013)		1 July 1958	15 February 1959	Christian Democracy	Fanfani II
Fernando Tambroni (1901–1963)		15 February 1959	25 March 1960	Christian Democracy	Segni II
Paolo Emilio Taviani (1912–2001)		25 March 1960	21 February 1962	Christian Democracy	Tambroni; Fanfani III
Roberto Tremelloni (1900–1987)		21 February 1962	21 June 1963	Italian Democratic Socialist Party	Fanfani IV
Emilio Colombo (1920–2013)		21 June 1963	6 August 1970	Christian Democracy	Leone I Moro I·II·III; Leone II; Rumor I·II·III
Mario Ferrari Aggradi (1916–1997)		6 August 1970	17 February 1972	Christian Democracy	Colombo
Emilio Colombo (1920–2013)		17 February 1972	26 June 1972	Christian Democracy	Andreotti I
Giovanni Malagodi (1904–1981)		26 June 1972	7 July 1973	Italian Liberal Party	Andreotti II
Ugo La Malfa (1903–1979)		7 July 1973	14 March 1974	Italian Republican Party	Rumor IV
Emilio Colombo (1920–2013)		14 March 1974	29 July 1976	Christian Democracy	Rumor V Moro IV·V
Gaetano Stammati (1908–2002)		29 July 1976	11 March 1978	Christian Democracy	Andreotti III
Filippo Maria Pandolfi (1927–2025)		11 March 1978	18 October 1980	Christian Democracy	Andreotti IV
Filippo Maria Pandolfi (1927–2025)		11 March 1978	18 October 1980	Christian Democracy	Andreotti V Cossiga I·II
Beniamino Andreatta (1928–2007)		18 October 1980	1 December 1982	Christian Democracy	Forlani; Spadolini I·II
Giovanni Goria (1943–1994)		1 December 1982	28 July 1987	Christian Democracy	Fanfani V Craxi I·II; Fanfani VI
Giuliano Amato (1938– )		28 July 1987	22 July 1987	Italian Socialist Party	Goria; De Mita
Guido Carli (1914–1993)		22 July 1987	28 June 1992	Christian Democracy	Andreotti VI·VII
Piero Barucci (1933–2026)		28 June 1992	10 May 1994	Independent	Amato I
Piero Barucci (1933–2026)		28 June 1992	10 May 1994	Independent	Ciampi
Lamberto Dini (1931– )		10 May 1994	17 May 1996	Independent	Berlusconi I
Lamberto Dini (1931– )		10 May 1994	17 May 1996	Independent	Dini
Minister of the Treasury, Budget and Economic Planning
Carlo Azeglio Ciampi (1920–2016)		17 May 1996	13 May 1999	Independent	Prodi I D'Alema I
Giuliano Amato (1938– )		13 May 1999	25 April 2000	The Olive Tree	D'Alema I·II
Vincenzo Visco (1942–)		25 April 2000	11 June 2001	Democrats of the Left	Amato II
Minister of Economics and Finance (see list)
