= Umberto Merlin =

Italian lawyer and politician (1885–1964)

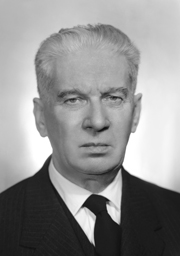

Minister of Public Works
- In office 18 January 1954 – 9 February 1954
- Prime Minister: Amintore Fanfani
- In office 17 August 1953 – 17 January 1954
- Prime Minister: Giuseppe Pella

Minister of Post and Telecommunications
- In office 16 July 1953 – 16 August 1953
- Prime Minister: Alcide De Gasperi
- In office 31 May 1947 – 23 May 1948
- Prime Minister: Alcide De Gasperi

Personal details
- Born: 17 February 1885 Rovigo
- Died: 22 May 1964 (aged 79) Padua
- Party: Italian Popular Party; Christian Democracy
- Spouse: Maria Vittoria Lorenzoni
- Children: 4
- Education: University of Padua

Umberto Merlin (17 February 1885 – 22 May 1964) was an Italian lawyer and Christian Democrat politician who held several cabinet posts in the 1940s and 1950s.

== Early life and education ==
Merlin was born in Rovigo on 17 February 1885. He was president of the Catholic Youth Club of St. Francis Association. In 1903, he became the Veneto regional president of the Association. In 1906, he obtained a degree in law from the University of Padua.

== Career ==
Following his graduation, Merlin worked as a lawyer. He participated in World War I with the rank of lieutenant. He was a cofounder the Italian Popular Party, but during the Fascist rule he did not involve in politics. After World War II Merlin resumed his political activities and joined the Christian Democracy Party. He was elected as one of the 60 national councilors of the Christian Democrats in the congress held in Rome on 24–27 April 1946. The same year, he was elected deputy to the Constituent Assembly. In 1947, Merlin was named as the general secretary of the party. In 1948, he became a senator and served in the first four legislatures. He served as the minister of posts and telecommunications in the cabinet led by Alcide De Gasperi between 31 May 1947 and 23 May 1948. He also served in the same post in the cabinet headed again by Alcide De Gasperi from 16 July to 16 August 1953. He was the minister of public works in the cabinet led by Giuseppe Pella (17 August 1953 – 17 January 1954) and in the first cabinet of Amintore Fanfani (18 January–9 February 1954). Then he served in the municipal and provincial council of Polesine.

== Personal life and death ==
Merlin married Maria Vittoria Lorenzoni, with whom he had four children. He died of a heart attack in Padua on 22 May 1964.
