= Antonio Azara =

Italian jurist and politician (1883–1967)

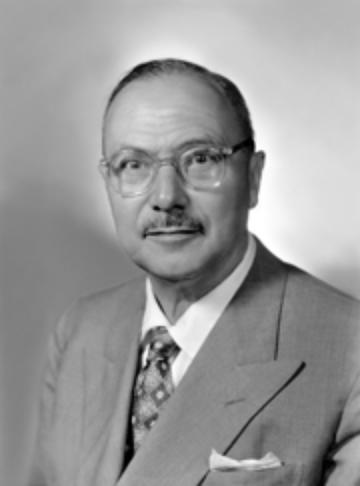

Minister for Grace and Justice
- In office August 1953 – January 1954
- Prime Minister: Giuseppe Pella
- Preceded by: Guido Gonella
- Succeeded by: Michele De Pietro

Personal details
- Born: 18 January 1883 Tempio Pausania, Kingdom of Italy
- Died: 20 February 1967 (aged 84) Rome, Italy
- Party: National Fascist Party; Christian Democracy (1945–1994)

Antonio Azara (18 January 1883 – 20 February 1967) was an Italian jurist and politician who served as the minister of grace and justice from August 1953 to January 1954.

== Early life and education ==
Azara was born in Tempio Pausania on 18 January 1883. He received a bachelor's degree in law specializing on family and agricultural law.

== Career ==
In 1907 Azara became attorney general and first president of the Supreme Court. He was also the secretary of the code reform commission. In 1932 he joined the National Fascist Party. Before his formal party membership he had been supporting National Fascist movement, ideas and doctrines through his writings and activities. As of 1945 he was a member of the scientific committee of the magazine entitled Diritto razzista (Italian: Racist Law). Following the end of the Fascist rule in Italy he justified his activities arguing that he had served not "a party", but his "country".

In 1948 he was elected senator with the Christian Democracy, keeping a seat from Palazzo Madama until 1968. In 1952 he was also appointed public prosecutor of the Supreme Court. He served as the minister of grace and justice in the Pella cabinet from August 1953 to January 1954. He also served as the vice-president of the committee on legal and administrative questions under the Council of Europe.

== Personal life and death ==
Azara died in Rome on 20 February 1967.
