= First Fanfani government =

9th government of the Italian Republic

Fanfani I Cabinet
- 9th Cabinet of Italy

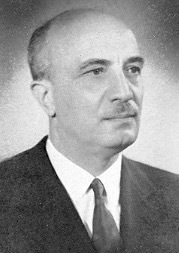
- Date formed: 18 January 1954
- Date dissolved: 10 February 1954

People and organisations
- Head of state: Luigi Einaudi
- Head of government: Amintore Fanfani
- Total no. of members: 18
- Member party: Christian Democracy
- Status in legislature: One-party government

History
- Legislature term: Legislature II (1953–1958)
- Predecessor: Pella Cabinet
- Successor: Scelba Cabinet

The Fanfani I Cabinet was the 9th cabinet of the Italian Republic, which held office from 18 January 1954 to 10 February 1954, for a total of 23 days.

The Government fell on 30 January, after the Chamber rejected the trust with 260 votes in favor, 303 votes against and 12 abstentions out of 563 present. This was the shortest-lived cabinet in the history of the Italian Republic.

== Government parties ==
The Fanfani I Cabinet was a one-party government, composed only of members of Christian Democracy (DC).

== Composition ==
Office	Name	Party	Term
Prime Minister	Amintore Fanfani	DC	19 January 1954–10 February 1954
Minister of Foreign Affairs	Attilio Piccioni	DC	19 January 1954–10 February 1954
Minister of the Interior	Giulio Andreotti	DC	19 January 1954–10 February 1954
Minister of Grace and Justice	Michele De Pietro	DC	19 January 1954–10 February 1954
Minister of Budget	Ezio Vanoni	DC	19 January 1954–10 February 1954
Minister of Finance	Adone Zoli	DC	19 January 1954–10 February 1954
Minister of Treasury	Silvio Gava	DC	19 January 1954–10 February 1954
Minister of Defence	Paolo Emilio Taviani	DC	19 January 1954–10 February 1954
Minister of Public Education	Egidio Tosato	DC	19 January 1954–10 February 1954
Minister of Public Works	Umberto Merlin	DC	19 January 1954–10 February 1954
Minister of Agriculture and Forests	Giuseppe Medici	DC	19 January 1954–10 February 1954
Minister of Transport	Bernardo Mattarella	DC	19 January 1954–10 February 1954
Minister of Post and Telecommunications	Gennaro Cassiani	DC	19 January 1954–10 February 1954
Minister of Industry and Commerce	Salvatore Aldisio	DC	19 January 1954–10 February 1954
Minister of Foreign Trade	Giordano Dell'Amore	DC	19 January 1954–10 February 1954
Minister of Merchant Navy	Fernando Tambroni	DC	19 January 1954–10 February 1954
Minister of Labour and Social Security	Luigi Gui	DC	19 January 1954–10 February 1954
Minister for the Fund for the South (without portfolio)	Pietro Campilli	DC	19 January 1954–10 February 1954
Minister for Public Administration Reform (without portfolio)	Umberto Tupini	DC	19 January 1954–10 February 1954
Secretary of the Council of Ministers	Mariano Rumor	DC	19 January 1954–10 February 1954
