= Minister of Public Education (Italy) =

Ministry in the Cabinet of Italy

Minister of Education and Merit
- Ministro dell'Istruzione e del Merito

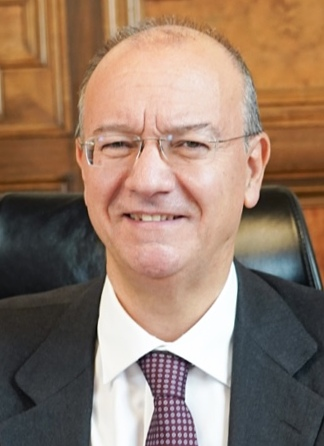
- Incumbent; Giuseppe Valditara since 22 October 2022
- Ministry of Public Education
- Member of: Council of Ministers
- Seat: Rome
- Appointer: The president of Italy
- Term length: No fixed term
- Formation: 13 July 1946; 80 years ago
- First holder: Guido Gonella
- Website: www.miur.gov.it

This is a list of Italian ministers of public education (Italian: ministri della pubblica istruzione) since the birth of the Italian Republic in 1946. The list shows also the ministers that served under the same office but with other names, in fact this ministry has changed name many times. The minister of public education leads the Ministry of Public Education.

The current minister is Giuseppe Valditara, a member of the League who is serving since 22 October 2022 in the government of Giorgia Meloni.

== List of public education ministers ==
Parties:

- 1946–1994:
  - Christian Democracy
  - Italian Liberal Party
  - Italian Democratic Socialist Party
  - Italian Republican Party
- 1994–present
  - Christian Democratic Centre
  - Democratic Party of the Left / Democrats of the Left
  - Forza Italia / The People of Freedom
  - Democratic Party
  - Five Star Movement
  - League
  - Independent

Coalitions:

- 1946–1994:
  - Centrist coalition
  - Organic Centre-left
  - Pentapartito/Quadripartito
  - Mixed coalition
- 1994–present:
  - Centre-right coalition
  - Centre-left coalition
  - Mixed coalition

Portrait	Name (Born–Died)	Term of office			Party	Government	Ref.
Portrait	Name (Born–Died)	Took office	Left office	Time in office	Party	Government	Ref.
Minister of Public Education
	Guido Gonella (1905–1982)	13 July 1946	26 July 1951	5 years, 13 days	Christian Democracy	De Gasperi II·III	
	Guido Gonella (1905–1982)	13 July 1946	26 July 1951	5 years, 13 days	Christian Democracy	De Gasperi IV·V·VI	
	Antonio Segni (1891–1972)	26 July 1951	16 July 1953	1 year, 355 days	Christian Democracy	De Gasperi VII	
	Giuseppe Bettiol (1907–1982)	16 July 1953	17 August 1953	32 days	Christian Democracy	De Gasperi VIII	
	Antonio Segni (1891–1972)	17 August 1953	18 January 1954	154 days	Christian Democracy	Pella	
	Egidio Tosato (1902–1984)	18 January 1954	10 February 1954	23 days	Christian Democracy	Fanfani I	
	Gaetano Martino (1900–1967)	10 February 1954	19 September 1954	221 days	Italian Liberal Party	Scelba	
	Giuseppe Ermini (1900–1981)	19 September 1954	6 July 1955	290 days	Christian Democracy	Scelba	
	Paolo Rossi (1900–1985)	6 July 1955	19 May 1957	1 year, 317 days	Italian Democratic Socialist Party	Segni I	
	Aldo Moro (1916–1978)	19 May 1957	16 February 1959	1 year, 273 days	Christian Democracy	Zoli; Fanfani II	
	Giuseppe Medici (1907–2000)	16 February 1959	26 July 1960	1 year, 161 days	Christian Democracy	Segni II; Tambroni	
	Giacinto Bosco (1905–1997)	26 July 1960	21 February 1962	1 year, 210 days	Christian Democracy	Fanfani III	
	Luigi Gui (1914–2010)	21 February 1962	24 June 1968	6 years, 124 days	Christian Democracy	Fanfani IV; Leone I	
	Luigi Gui (1914–2010)	21 February 1962	24 June 1968	6 years, 124 days	Christian Democracy	Moro I·II·III	
	Giovanni Battista Scaglia (1910–2006)	24 June 1968	12 December 1968	171 days	Christian Democracy	Leone II	
	Fiorentino Sullo (1921–2000)	12 December 1968	24 February 1969	74 days	Christian Democracy	Rumor I	
	Mario Ferrari Aggradi (1916–1997)	24 February 1969	27 March 1970	1 year, 31 days	Christian Democracy	Rumor I	
	Mario Ferrari Aggradi (1916–1997)	24 February 1969	27 March 1970	1 year, 31 days	Christian Democracy	Rumor II	
	Riccardo Misasi (1931–2000)	27 March 1970	26 June 1972	2 years, 91 days	Christian Democracy	Rumor III; Colombo	
	Riccardo Misasi (1931–2000)	27 March 1970	26 June 1972	2 years, 91 days	Christian Democracy	Andreotti I	
	Oscar Luigi Scalfaro (1918–2012)	26 June 1972	7 July 1973	1 year, 11 days	Christian Democracy	Andreotti II	
	Franco Maria Malfatti (1927–1991)	7 July 1973	11 March 1978	4 years, 247 days	Christian Democracy	Rumor IV·V	
	Franco Maria Malfatti (1927–1991)	7 July 1973	11 March 1978	4 years, 247 days	Christian Democracy	Moro IV·V; Andreotti III	
	Mario Pedini (1918–2003)	11 March 1978	20 March 1979	1 year, 9 days	Christian Democracy	Andreotti IV	
	Giovanni Spadolini (1925–1994)	20 March 1979	4 August 1979	137 days	Italian Republican Party	Andreotti V	
	Salvatore Valitutti (1907–1992)	4 August 1979	4 April 1980	244 days	Italian Liberal Party	Cossiga I	
	Adolfo Sarti (1928–1992)	4 April 1980	18 October 1980	197 days	Christian Democracy	Cossiga II	
	Guido Bodrato (1933–2023)	18 October 1980	1 December 1982	2 years, 44 days	Christian Democracy	Forlani	
	Guido Bodrato (1933–2023)	18 October 1980	1 December 1982	2 years, 44 days	Christian Democracy	Spadolini I·II	
	Franca Falcucci (1926–2014)	1 December 1982	29 July 1987	4 years, 229 days	Christian Democracy	Fanfani V Craxi I·II	
	Franca Falcucci (1926–2014)	1 December 1982	29 July 1987	4 years, 229 days	Christian Democracy	Fanfani VI	
	Giovanni Galloni (1927–2018)	29 July 1987	22 July 1989	1 year, 358 days	Christian Democracy	Goria; De Mita	
	Sergio Mattarella (1941–)	22 July 1989	27 July 1990	1 year, 5 days	Christian Democracy	Andreotti VI	
	Gerardo Bianco (1931–2022)	27 July 1990	12 April 1991	259 days	Christian Democracy	Andreotti VI	
	Riccardo Misasi (1931–2000)	12 April 1991	28 June 1992	1 year, 77 days	Christian Democracy	Andreotti VII	
	Rosa Russo Iervolino (1936–)	28 June 1992	10 May 1994	1 year, 316 days	Christian Democracy / Italian People's Party	Amato I	
	Rosa Russo Iervolino (1936–)	28 June 1992	10 May 1994	1 year, 316 days	Christian Democracy / Italian People's Party	Ciampi	
	Francesco D'Onofrio (1939–)	10 May 1994	17 January 1995	252 days	Christian Democratic Centre	Berlusconi I	
	Giancarlo Lombardi (1937–2017)	17 January 1995	17 May 1996	1 year, 121 days	Independent	Dini	
Minister of Education, University and Research
	Luigi Berlinguer (1932–2023)	17 May 1996	21 October 1998	2 years, 157 days	Democratic Party of the Left	Prodi I	
Minister of Public Education
	Luigi Berlinguer (1932–2023)	21 October 1998	25 April 2000	1 year, 187 days	Democrats of the Left	D'Alema I·II	
	Tullio De Mauro (1932–2017)	25 April 2000	11 June 2001	1 year, 47 days	Independent	Amato II	
Minister of Education, University and Research
	Letizia Moratti (1949–)	11 June 2001	17 May 2006	4 years, 340 days	Forza Italia	Berlusconi II·III	
Minister of Public Education
	Giuseppe Fioroni (1958–)	17 May 2006	8 May 2008	1 year, 357 days	The Daisy / Democratic Party	Prodi II	
Minister of Education, University and Research
	Mariastella Gelmini (1973–)	8 May 2008	16 November 2011	3 years, 192 days	The People of Freedom	Berlusconi IV	
	Francesco Profumo (1953– )	16 November 2011	28 April 2013	1 year, 163 days	Independent	Monti	
	Maria Chiara Carrozza (1965–)	28 April 2013	22 February 2014	300 days	Democratic Party	Letta	
	Stefania Giannini (1960–)	22 February 2014	12 December 2016	2 years, 294 days	Civic Choice / Democratic Party	Renzi	
	Valeria Fedeli (1949–2026)	12 December 2016	1 June 2018	1 year, 171 days	Democratic Party	Gentiloni	
	Marco Bussetti (1962– )	1 June 2018	5 September 2019	1 year, 96 days	Independent	Conte I	
	Lorenzo Fioramonti (1977– )	5 September 2019	25 December 2019	111 days	Five Star Movement	Conte II	
	Giuseppe Conte (1964– ) As Prime Minister	25 December 2019	10 January 2020	16 days	Independent	Conte II	
Minister of Education
	Lucia Azzolina (1982– )	10 January 2020	13 February 2021	1 year, 34 days	Five Star Movement	Conte II	
	Patrizio Bianchi (1952– )	13 February 2021	22 October 2022	1 year, 251 days	Independent	Draghi	
Minister of Education and Merit
	Giuseppe Valditara (1961– )	22 October 2022	Incumbent	3 years, 321 days	League	Meloni	
