= Adone Zoli =

Italian politician (1887–1960)

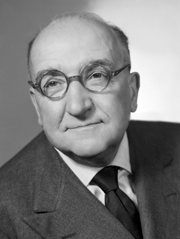

Prime Minister of Italy
- In office 20 May 1957 – 2 July 1958
- President: Giovanni Gronchi
- Deputy: Giuseppe Pella
- Preceded by: Antonio Segni
- Succeeded by: Amintore Fanfani

Minister of Budget
- In office 15 February 1956 – 2 July 1958
- Prime Minister: Antonio Segni; Himself
- Preceded by: Ezio Vanoni
- Succeeded by: Giuseppe Medici

Minister of Finance
- In office 19 January 1954 – 10 February 1954
- Prime Minister: Amintore Fanfani
- Preceded by: Ezio Vanoni
- Succeeded by: Roberto Tremelloni

Minister of Grace and Justice
- In office 26 July 1951 – 16 July 1953
- Prime Minister: Alcide De Gasperi
- Preceded by: Attilio Piccioni
- Succeeded by: Guido Gonella

Member of the Senate of the Republic
- In office 8 May 1948 – 20 February 1960
- Constituency: Florence

Personal details
- Born: Adone Alvaro Ugo Natale Camillo Zoli; 16 December 1887 Cesena, Emilia-Romagna, Kingdom of Italy
- Died: 20 February 1960 (aged 72) Rome, Lazio, Italy
- Party: Italian People's Party (1919–26); Christian Democracy (1943–60)
- Spouse: Lucia Zoli
- Children: 3
- Education: University of Bologna

Adone Alvaro Ugo Natale Camillo Zoli (Italian pronunciation: [aˈdoːne dˈdzɔːli]; 16 December 1887 – 20 February 1960) was an Italian politician who served as the 35th prime minister of Italy from May 1957 to July 1958; he was the first senator to have ever held the office.

A member of the Christian Democracy, Zoli served also as minister of Grace and Justice, Finance and Budget, during the 1950s.

== Early life ==
Adone Zoli was born in Cesena, Emilia-Romagna, in 1887. He grew up in a wealthy and Catholic observant family. In 1907, he graduated in law at the University of Bologna, starting a career as a lawyer first in Genoa, then in Bologna and finally in Florence, where he met Tommaso Brunelli, a Catholic lawyer, elected deputy from Italian People's Party (PPI) in 1919, who greatly influenced Zoli's political ideology.

During these years he married Lucia Zoli, his cousin, with whom he had three children.

Adone Zoli fought in the World War I as a volunteer, taking part in the battle of Caporetto and obtained, at the end of the conflict, two crosses for war merit and one for military honor. After the war he participated in various congresses of the PPI founded by Don Luigi Sturzo. In 1920, he became a member of party's national council, while in October 1921 he was appointed in the national direction, a position that he held until the dissolution of the party in 1926, imposed by the fascist regime of Benito Mussolini. For all his political career, Zoli remained strong anti-fascist.

=== Resistance movement ===
In 1943, he joined the partisan resistance by setting up the anti-fascist committee in Florence and later joining the National Liberation Committee (CLN), a political umbrella organization and the main representative of the resistance movement fighting against the German occupation of Italy in the aftermath of the Armistice of Cassibile.

In November 1943 he was arrested with two of his children and sentenced to death by the Nazis, but he was freed by his partisan comrades. In February 1944, he avoided another attempt to arrest him, but his wife and three children were arrested instead.

In December 1943, he was among the founders of the Christian Democracy, the new centrist party, heir of the PPI, led by Alcide De Gasperi. After the liberation from the Nazis, Zoli served deputy mayor of Florence in the municipal government chaired by Gaetano Pieraccini.

== Political career ==
On 25 September 1945, Zoli was appointed in the National Council, an unelected provisional legislative assembly set up in the Kingdom of Italy after the end of World War II. He remained in office until 1 June 1946, when new election were held, in which Zoli decided not to run.

After the 1948 general election, Zoli was elected to the Senate of the Republic for the constituency of Florence, with nearly 70,000 votes.

=== Minister of Justice ===
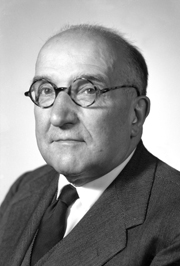
Adone Zoli in 1948

As a close ally of De Gasperi, in July 1951 he was appointed Minister of Grace and Justice in De Gasperi's seventh government.

During his ministry he worked to improve conditions of prisoners, which were still subjected to fascist laws and regulations, in accordance with the principle of the re-educational function of the penalty, expressed by the new republican constitution. Zoli implemented important measures that included the abolition of the head shaving for prisoners sentenced to short penalties and the exemption from the obligation to wear prison clothes for prisoners. He also established that the condemned should be called by prison officers by name and no longer by matriculation number. He also increased the courses of education, cinematographic and theatrical performances, and allowed to keep in the cell the necessary to write, as well as the photographs of their families.

In addition, Zoli supported the plan, started by communist leader, Palmiro Togliatti, to grant amnesty for crimes committed "for political ends" from the March on Rome to 18 June 1946. This law, approved by parliament in 1953, increased Zoli's popularity.

The 1953 general election was characterised by changes in the electoral law. Even if the general structure remained uncorrupted, the government introduced a superbonus of two-thirds of seats in the House for the coalition which would obtain at-large the absolute majority of votes. The change was strongly opposed by the opposition parties as well as DC's smaller coalition partners, who had no realistic chance of success under this system. The new law was called the Scam Law by its detractors, including some dissidents of minor government parties who founded special opposition groups to deny the artificial landslide to Christian Democracy.

The campaign of the opposition to the Scam Law achieved its goal. The government coalition won 49.9% of national vote, just a few thousand votes of the threshold for a supermajority, resulting in an ordinary proportional distribution of the seats. Technically, the government won the election, winning a clear working majority of seats in both houses. But frustration with the failure to win a supermajority caused significant tensions in the leading coalition. De Gasperi was forced to resign by the Parliament on 2 August. On 17 August, President Einaudi appointed Giuseppe Pella as new prime minister and Zoli was not confirmed at the Ministry of Justice.

=== Minister of Finance ===
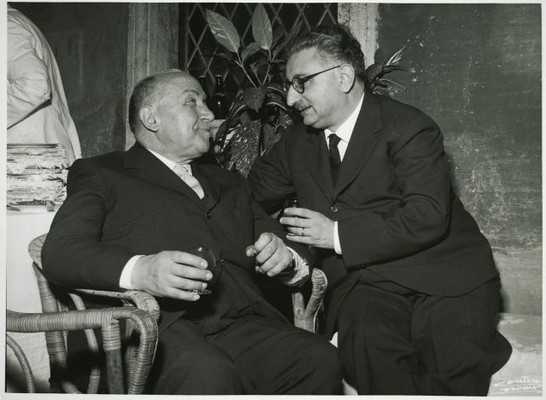
Zoli with Giovanni Leone in 1957

On 12 January 1954, after only five months in power, Prime Minister Pella was forced to resign, after a strong confrontation with many members of DC, regarding the appointment of Salvatore Aldisio as new Minister of Agriculture. President Luigi Einaudi appointed Amintore Fanfani as new head of the government. Fanfani formed a one-party government composed only by members of the Christian Democracy and Zoli was appointed Minister of Finance.

However, the cabinet lasted only 23 days when it failed to win approval in the Parliament, being rejected by the Chamber of Deputies with 260 votes in favor, 303 votes against and 12 abstentions out of 563 present. On 10 February, Mario Scelba sworn in as new prime minister. Fanfani's first government was the shortest-lived cabinet in the history of the Italian Republic. Since De Gasperi's retirement in 1953 Fanfani emerged as the most probable successor, a role confirmed by his appointment as party secretary in June 1954, a position that he would held until March 1959.

=== Minister of Budget ===
In April 1955, Giovanni Gronchi was elected new president of the Republic. After the election, a political crisis between Prime Minister Scelba and DC's leader Fanfani broke out. In July 1955, Scelba resigned from the office, and Segni received the task of forming a new cabinet. Zoli was appointed Minister of Budget.

In May 1957, the Italian Democratic Socialist Party (PSDI) withdrew its support to the government and on 6 May, Segni resigned.

== Prime Minister of Italy ==
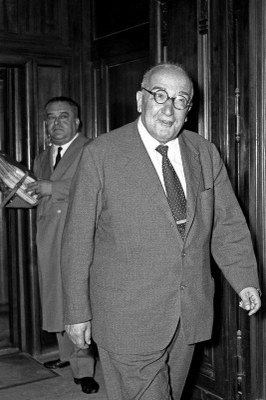
Adone Zoli in the 1950s

President Gronchi gave Zoli the task of forming a new cabinet, and on 20 May, Zoli sworn in as new head of government. He formed a one-party cabinet, composed only by members of the Christian Democracy, in which he kept the ad interim Ministry of Budget.

On 4 June 1957, the government obtained the confidence vote in the Senate, with 132 votes in favor and 93 against, and on 7 June in the Chamber of Deputies, with 305 votes in favor, 255 against and 11 abstentions. The government externally supported by the Italian Liberal Party (PLI), the Italian Republican Party (PRI), the PSDI, the monarchist parties and also by the neo-fascist Italian Social Movement (MSI); it was the first time in republican history, that the MSI supported a government. The support of the neo-fascists raised many criticisms and Zoli then simply declared that MSI votes were not necessary for the majority. The next day, however, he realized that the count was wrong and that the MSI's support had actually been decisive. Then Zoli, a staunch anti-fascist, resigned on the following 10 June, but he was invited by President Gronchi to withdraw his resignation and to remain in power until the natural dissolution of the Italian Parliament in 1958.

Zoli also approved the request of the MSI to bury the body of Benito Mussolini in Predappio, his hometown; a request that was also supported by Pietro Nenni, leader of the Italian Socialist Party (PSI), who was a personal friend of Mussolini during the 1910s. The dictator's body was buried in Predappio on 30 August 1957.

In the 1958 general election, the Christian Democracy gained 42.4% of votes, nearly doubling Palmiro Togliatti's Communist Party, which arrived second. However, the poor results of the other small centrist and secular parties kept the same problems of political instability within the centrist coalition, which characterised the previous legislature. As he promised few months before, Zoli resigned after the new general election and, on 1 July 1958, Amintore Fanfani sworn in as new Prime Minister at the head of a coalition government with the PSDI, and a case-by-case support of the PRI.

== Death and legacy ==
Adone Zoli died in Rome on 20 February 1960, at the age of 72. He was buried in the family grave in the cemetery of San Cassiano in Predappio, a few meters from the crypt of Mussolini.

In 1963, the President of the Republic Giuseppe Saragat recognized, with a presidential decree, the "Adone Zoli Center for Economic and Social Policy", an institute founded in memory of the former prime minister.

== Electoral history ==
Election	House	Constituency	Party	Votes	Result
1948	Senate of the Republic	Florence	DC	68,525	Elected
1953	Senate of the Republic	Florence	DC	57,157	Elected
1958	Senate of the Republic	Florence	DC	53,531	Elected

Political offices
Preceded by Attilio Piccioni	Minister of Grace and Justice; 1951–1953	Succeeded by Guido Gonella
Preceded by Ezio Vanoni	Minister of Finance; 1954	Succeeded by Roberto Tremelloni
Preceded by Ezio Vanoni	Minister of Budget; 1956–1958	Succeeded by Giuseppe Medici
Preceded by Antonio Segni	Prime Minister of Italy; 1957–1958	Succeeded by Amintore Fanfani
