= Leopoldo Rubinacci =

Italian lawyer and politician (1903–1969)

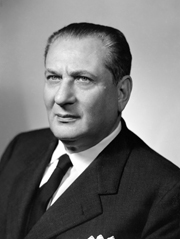

Personal details
- Born: 13 September 1903 San Giorgio a Cremano, Kingdom of Italy
- Died: 19 October 1969 (aged 66) Milan, Italy
- Party: Christian Democracy

Leopoldo Rubinacci (13 September 1903 – 19 October 1969) was an Italian politician, lawyer and trade unionist. He was a member of the Christian Democracy and held various cabinet posts, including minister of labor and social security and minister of scientific research.

== Biography ==
Rubinacci was born in San Giorgio a Cremano on 13 September 1903. He was a lawyer by profession. He served at the Chamber of Deputies for the Christian Democrats in the second and third legislatures. He was a senator in the first and fourth terms. He served as the undersecretary for the Ministry of Labor and Social Security in the sixth cabinet of Prime Minister Alcide De Gasperi from 1950 to 1951. He was the minister of labor and social security in the De Gasperi's seventh and eighth cabinets between 1951 and 1953 and the minister of scientific research in the third cabinet of Aldo Moro between 1966 and 1968.

He was the author of several books which were about labor unions.

He died in Milan on 19 October 1969.
