= Guido Gonella =

Italian journalist and politician

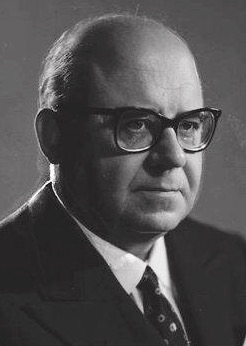

Minister of Justice
- In office 18 February 1972 – 8 July 1973
- Prime Minister: Giulio Andreotti
- Preceded by: Emilio Colombo (as PM)
- Succeeded by: Mario Zagari
- In office 24 June 1968 – 12 December 1968
- Prime Minister: Giovanni Leone
- Preceded by: Oronzo Reale
- Succeeded by: Silvio Gava
- In office 19 May 1957 – 21 February 1962
- Prime Minister: Adone Zoli; Amintore Fanfani; Antonio Segni; Fernando Tambroni
- Preceded by: Aldo Moro
- Succeeded by: Giacinto Bosco
- In office 16 July 1953 – 17 August 1953
- Prime Minister: Alcide De Gasperi
- Preceded by: Adone Zoli
- Succeeded by: Antonio Azara

Minister of Public Education
- In office 13 July 1946 – 19 July 1951
- Prime Minister: Alcide De Gasperi
- Preceded by: Enrico Molè
- Succeeded by: Antonio Segni

Member of the European Parliament
- In office 17 July 1979 – 19 August 1982
- Constituency: Central Italy

Member of the Senate of the Republic
- In office 25 May 1972 – 19 August 1982
- Constituency: Veneto

Member of the Chamber of Deputies
- In office 8 May 1948 – 24 May 1972
- Constituency: Verona

Member of the Constituent Assembly
- In office 25 June 1946 – 31 January 1948
- Constituency: Verona

Personal details
- Born: 18 September 1905 Verona, Italy
- Died: 19 August 1982 (aged 76) Nettuno, Italy
- Party: Christian Democracy
- Education: Università Cattolica del Sacro Cuore; Sapienza University of Rome
- Occupation: Politician, academic, journalist

Guido Gonella (18 September 1905 – 19 August 1982) was an Italian politician from the Christian Democracy, former Minister of Public Education and Minister of Justice.

== Biography ==
=== Academic career ===
Gonella graduated in Philosophy at the Catholic University of Milan and in Law at the Sapienza University of Rome, teaching a few years later Philosophy of law at the University of Bari and at the University of Pavia.

=== Journalistic career ===
He later became a columnist of L'Osservatore Romano, receiving the task of talking about the foreign affairs by Bishop Giovanni Montini, the future Pope Paul VI. However, Gonella was kept under control by the political police for suspected anti-fascism: several times the fascist hierarchy asked Benito Mussolini to suppress the Vatican newspaper, but L'Osservatore Romano belonged to the Holy See and therefore could not be suppressed by the Italian government.

On 3 September 1939, a few days after the beginning of World War II, Gonella was arrested by the fascists and brought to Regina Coeli, being freed only after the intervention of Pope Pius XII. Though he returned to L'Osservatore Romano, he was forbidden to teach in Universities.

=== Political career ===
Before the World War II, Gonella began to work with Alcide De Gasperi and took part in the drawing of the Code of Camaldoli, the document planning of economic policy by members of the Italian Catholic forces. In 1943, Gonella joined the new-born party Christian Democracy, with which he was elected to the Constituent Assembly in 1945, to the Chamber of Deputies from 1948 to 1968 and to the Senate from 1972 to 1979.

From 1950 to 1953 he has also been elected Secretary of the Christian Democracy.

He has been the first Minister of Public Education of the Italian Republic in the Cabinets led by Alcide De Gasperi and has been many times, over a period of 20 years, Minister of Justice.

During the 1978 presidential election, Gonella was the candidate of the Christian Democracy for the office of President of Italy, until the party decided, together with all the left-wing and centre-left parties in Parliament, to support the Socialist candidate Sandro Pertini.

=== Death ===
Gonella died in Nettuno, near Rome, at the age of 76, on 19 August 1982, exactly 28 years after the death of Alcide De Gasperi.

== Electoral history ==
| Election | House | Constituency | Party | Votes | Result |
|---|---|---|---|---|---|
| 1946 | Constituent Assembly | Verona–Padua–Vicenza–Rovigo | DC | 71,515 | Elected |
| 1948 | Chamber of Deputies | Verona–Padua–Vicenza–Rovigo | DC | 76,236 | Elected |
| 1953 | Chamber of Deputies | Verona–Padua–Vicenza–Rovigo | DC | 61,125 | Elected |
| 1958 | Chamber of Deputies | Verona–Padua–Vicenza–Rovigo | DC | 65,176 | Elected |
| 1963 | Chamber of Deputies | Verona–Padua–Vicenza–Rovigo | DC | 60,048 | Elected |
| 1968 | Chamber of Deputies | Verona–Padua–Vicenza–Rovigo | DC | 55,992 | Elected |
| 1972 | Senate of the Republic | Veneto – Verona Collina | DC | 77,958 | Elected |
| 1976 | Senate of the Republic | Veneto – Verona Collina | DC | 82,949 | Elected |
| 1979 | Senate of the Republic | Veneto – Verona Collina | DC | 83,130 | Elected |
| 1979 | European Parliament | Central Italy | DC | 272,657 | Elected |
