= Paolo Cappa =

Italian lawyer, journalist and politician (1888–1956)

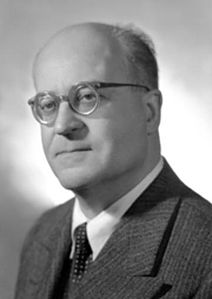

Minister of Merchant Navy
- In office 1947–1948
- In office 1951–1953

Personal details
- Born: 19 February 1888 Genoa, Kingdom of Italy
- Died: 26 June 1956 (aged 68) Rome, Italy
- Party: People's Party; Christian Democracy

Paolo Cappa (1888–1956) was an Italian journalist, lawyer and politician. He held several posts both in the Christian Democracy party (DC) and in various cabinets. He was also a member of the Italian Parliament and Senate.

== Biography ==
Cappa was born in Genoa on 19 February 1888. He obtained a degree in law.

Following his graduation Cappa worked for various publications, including Momento in Turin and Cittadino Genoa. He was the director of the newspaper Avvenire d'Italia between 1915 and 1923. In 1919 he was elected to the Parliament from his hometown for the People's Party where he served two more terms following the elections in 1921 and in 1924. He retired from politics during the Fascist rule and worked as a lawyer. He resumed his political activities in 1945 when he was elected as a deputy for the DC to the Constituent Assembly. He served as the undersecretary of the Council of Ministers in 1946. He was the first undersecretary of the DC together with Giulio Andreotti in the late 1940s. Both were against and prohibited the theatre plays which contained references to homosexuality. Cappa was the minister of merchant navy between May 1947 and May 1948 and between July 1951 and July 1953. He was also a senator in the first legislature from 1948 to 1953.

Cappa died in Rome on 26 June 1956.
