= Ezio Vanoni =

Italian economist and politician

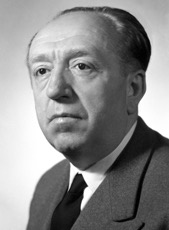

Minister of Finance
- In office 24 May 1948 – 18 January 1954
- Prime Minister: Alcide De Gasperi; Giuseppe Pella
- Preceded by: Giuseppe Pella
- Succeeded by: Adone Zoli
Other ministerial offices
Minister of Budget
In office 18 January 1954 – 16 February 1956
Prime Minister	Amintore Fanfani; Mario Scelba; Antonio Segni
Preceded by	Giuseppe Pella
Succeeded by	Adone Zoli
Minister of Foreign Commerce
In office 2 February 1947 – 1 June 1947
Prime Minister	Alcide De Gasperi
Preceded by	Pietro Campilli
Succeeded by	Cesare Merzagora
Parliamentary offices
Member of the Senate of the Republic
In office 8 May 1948 – 16 February 1956
Constituency	Lombardy
Member of the Constituent Assembly
In office 25 June 1946 – 31 January 1948
Constituency	Como–Sondrio–Varese

Personal details
- Born: 3 August 1903 Morbegno, Lombardy, Kingdom of Italy
- Died: 16 February 1956 (aged 52) Rome, Lazio, Italy
- Party: Christian Democracy
- Education: University of Pavia; Catholic University of Milan

Ezio Vanoni (3 August 1903 – 16 February 1956) was an Italian economist and politician who served as Minister of Finance from May 1948 to January 1954 and Minister Budget from January 1954 until February 1956.

Vanoni is widely considered one of the most prominent economists in Italy's post-war history. His economic and monetary policies strongly influenced the Italian reconstruction and the subsequent economic miracle.

== Electoral history ==
Election	House	Constituency	Party	Votes	Result
1946	Constituent Assembly	Como–Sondrio–Varese	DC	27,731	Elected
1948	Senate of the Republic	Lombardy – Sondrio	DC	46,452	Elected
1953	Senate of the Republic	Lombardy – Sondrio	DC	44,889	Elected
