= Antonio Segni =

President of Italy from 1962 to 1964

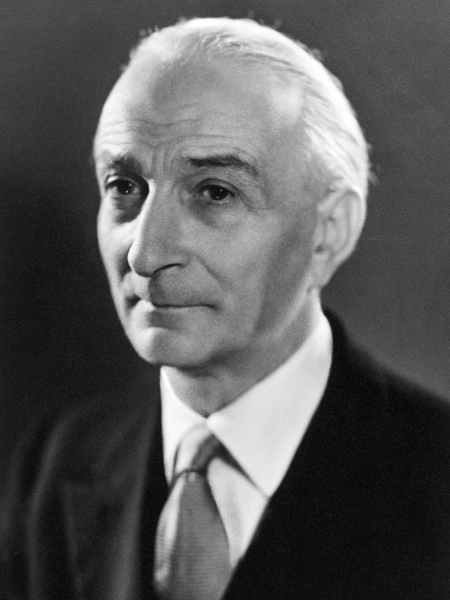
- Official portrait, 1962

President of Italy
- In office 11 May 1962 – 6 December 1964
- Prime Minister: Amintore Fanfani; Giovanni Leone; Aldo Moro
- Preceded by: Giovanni Gronchi
- Succeeded by: Giuseppe Saragat

Prime Minister of Italy
- In office 16 February 1959 – 26 March 1960
- President: Giovanni Gronchi
- Preceded by: Amintore Fanfani
- Succeeded by: Fernando Tambroni
- In office 6 July 1955 – 20 May 1957
- President: Giovanni Gronchi
- Deputy: Giuseppe Saragat
- Preceded by: Mario Scelba
- Succeeded by: Adone Zoli

Deputy Prime Minister of Italy
- In office 2 July 1958 – 16 February 1959
- Prime Minister: Amintore Fanfani
- Preceded by: Giuseppe Pella
- Succeeded by: Attilio Piccioni
Ministerial offices
Minister of Foreign Affairs
In office 26 March 1960 – 7 May 1962
Prime Minister	Fernando Tambroni; Amintore Fanfani
Preceded by	Giuseppe Pella
Succeeded by	Amintore Fanfani
Minister of the Interior
In office 16 February 1959 – 26 March 1960
Prime Minister	Himself
Preceded by	Fernando Tambroni
Succeeded by	Giuseppe Spataro
Minister of Defence
In office 2 July 1958 – 16 February 1959
Prime Minister	Amintore Fanfani
Preceded by	Paolo Emilio Taviani
Succeeded by	Giulio Andreotti
Minister of Public Education
In office 17 August 1953 – 19 January 1954
Prime Minister	Giuseppe Pella
Preceded by	Giovanni Bettiol
Succeeded by	Egidio Tosato
In office 26 July 1951 – 16 July 1953
Prime Minister	Alcide De Gasperi
Preceded by	Guido Gonella
Succeeded by	Giovanni Bettiol
Minister of Agriculture
In office 13 July 1946 – 26 July 1951
Prime Minister	Alcide De Gasperi
Preceded by	Fausto Gullo
Succeeded by	Amintore Fanfani
Parliamentary offices
Member of the Senate of the Republic
Ex officio
Life tenure 6 December 1964 – 1 December 1972
Member of the Chamber of Deputies
In office 8 May 1948 – 10 May 1962
Constituency	Cagliari–Sassari–Nuoro
Member of the Constituent Assembly
In office 25 June 1946 – 31 January 1948
Constituency	Cagliari–Sassari–Nuoro

Personal details
- Born: 2 February 1891 Sassari, Sardinia, Kingdom of Italy
- Died: 1 December 1972 (aged 81) Rome, Lazio, Italy
- Party: PPI (1919–1926); DC (1943–1972)
- Spouse: Laura Carta Caprino (m. 1921)
- Children: 4, including Mario
- Awards: Charlemagne Prize

Antonio Segni (Italian: [anˈtɔːnjo ˈseɲɲi]; 2 February 1891 – 1 December 1972) was an Italian politician and statesman who served as the president of Italy from 1962 to 1964, and as Prime Minister of Italy from 1955 to 1957 and again from 1959 to 1960.

A member of the Christian Democracy party, Segni held numerous prominent offices in Italy's post-war period, serving as the country's Minister of Foreign Affairs, Interior, Defence, Agriculture, and Public Education. He was the first Sardinian to become head of state and government. He was also the second shortest-serving president in the history of the Republic and the first to resign from office, due to illness.

== Early life ==
Segni was born in Sassari in 1891. His father, Celestino Segni, was a lawyer and professor at the University of Sassari, while his mother, Annetta Campus, was a housewife. He grew up in a well-off family, involved in Sardinian politics; his father served as municipal and provincial councilor for Sassari, as well as deputy mayor during the early 1910s. He began studying at the University of Sassari, where he would found a section of Azione Cattolica Italiana.

In 1913, Segni graduated with merit at the University of Sassari, with the thesis Il vadimonium on civil procedure in Roman law. He completed his studies in Rome with Giuseppe Chiovenda, of which he became the favorite student; in the law firm of the jurist, he met Piero Calamandrei, with whom he built a close friendship that would last a lifetime.

When the World War I broke out, Segni was enlisted as an artillery officer. Discharged, after some months, he continued his profession as lawyer, specializing in civil procedure. In 1920, he started his academic career as law professor at the University of Perugia. In 1921, he married Laura Carta Caprino (18 April 1896 – 21 July 1977) daughter of a rich landowner, with whom he had four children, including Mario, who would become a prominent politician during the early 1990s.

During these years, Segni started his involvement in politics. In 1919, he joined the Italian People's Party (PPI), a Christian democratic party, led by Don Luigi Sturzo. In 1923, he was appointed in party's national council. Segni ran in the 1924 Italian general election for Sardinia's constituency but was not elected. He remained a member of the PPI until all political organizations were dissolved by Benito Mussolini two years later in 1926. For the next 17 years, Segni left political life, continuing to teach civil procedure and agrarian law at the universities of Pavia, Perugia, Cagliari, and Sassari, where he later served as rector from 1946 to 1951.

== Early political career ==
In 1943, after the fall of Mussolini's Fascist regime, Segni was one of the founders of Christian Democracy (DC), the heir of the PPI. On 12 December 1944, he was appointed Undersecretary to the Ministry of Agriculture in the second Bonomi government.

=== Minister of Agriculture ===
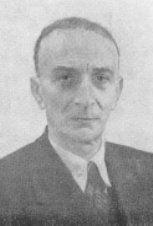
Segni in 1946

In the 1946 Italian general election, Segni was elected to the Constituent Assembly for the consistency of Cagliari–Sassari–Nuoro, receiving more than 40,000 votes. On 13 July 1946, he was appointed Minister of Agriculture in the second De Gasperi government. As minister, he primarily focused on the growth of agricultural production, functional to improving Italy's conditions after the end of the war. Segni tried to reform agricultural contracts but was strongly opposed by conservatives and by many members of the DC. The failure of this legislative proposal accelerated the timing of the development of the land reform.

The land reform, approved by the Italian Parliament in October 1950, was financed in part by the funds of the Marshall Plan launched by the United States in 1947 and considered by some scholars as the most important reform of the entire post-war period. Segni's reform proposed, through forced expropriation, the distribution of land to agricultural labourers, thus making them small entrepreneurs and no longer subject to the large landowner. If in some ways the reform had this beneficial result, for others it significantly reduced the size of farms, effectively removing any possibility of transforming them into advanced businesses. This negative element was mitigated and in some cases eliminated by forms of cooperatives.

Segni, who was a landowner, ordered the expropriation of most of his own estate in Sardinia. He became known as a "white Bolshevik" for his agrarian reforms. Modern historians assert that landowners were instead favoured by Segni, and his decrees allowed them to reclaim land that had been granted to the peasantry by the preceding administration.

=== Minister of Public Education ===
In July 1951, after a cabinet reshuffle, Segni left his office as Minister of Agriculture and was appointed the Italian Minister of Public Education in De Gasperi's seventh government, succeeding Guido Gonella.

As minister, Segni was particularly involved in the fight against illiteracy, in the improvement of teaching activities, and in the construction of new schools around the country; however, he did not continue the important reforms started by his predecessor. He tried to implement the reform step by step but encountered strong resistance, even in the ministries that were supposed to finance these measures. Segni proposed to replace the high school exam with an admission test to university, but this was rejected. His reforms, which also received various appreciations from the opposition parties due to his secular idea of school that was very different from that of Gonella, were not ambitious as the ones of his predecessor.

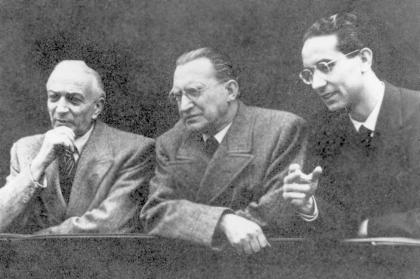
Segni with Alcide De Gasperi and Emilio Colombo in the early 1950s

The 1953 Italian general election was characterised by changes in the electoral law. Even if the general structure remained uncorrupted, the government introduced a majority bonus system of two-thirds of seats in the country's Chamber of Deputies for the coalition that would obtain at-large the absolute majority of votes. The change was strongly opposed by both the opposition parties and DC's smaller coalition partners that had no realistic chance of success under this system. The new law was called the scam law by its detractors, including some dissidents of minor government parties who founded special opposition groups to deny the artificial landslide victory of the DC.

The campaign of the opposition to the electoral law achieved its goal, as the government coalition won 49.9% of national vote, just a few thousand votes of the threshold for a supermajority, resulting in an ordinary proportional distribution of the seats. Technically, the government won the election, winning a clear working majority of seats in both houses. In July 1953, Segni was ousted from office in the newly formed government of Alcide De Gasperi. Frustration with the failure to win a supermajority caused significant tensions in the leading coalition, and De Gasperi was forced to resign by the Italian Parliament on 2 August. On 17 August, Italian president Luigi Einaudi appointed Pella as new prime minister, who selected Segni as his Minister of Public Education. Pella remained in power only for five months. In the successive governments of Amintore Fanfani and Mario Scelba, Segni was not appointed in any office.

== Prime Minister of Italy ==
In the 1955 Italian presidential election held on 28–29 April of that year, Giovanni Gronchi was elected the new president of the Republic. After the election, a political crisis between prime minister Scelba and DC's leader Fanfani broke out. In July 1955, Scelba resigned from the office, and Segni received the task of forming a new cabinet. He started consultations with parties to explore the possibilities of forming a new coalition government, obtaining the approval of DC, Italian Democratic Socialist Party (PSDI) and Italian Liberal Party (PLI), and the external support from the Italian Republican Party (PRI). On 6 July, Segni sworn in as the new prime minister. On 18 July, the government's program was approved by the Chamber of Deputies with 293 votes in favour and 265 against. On 22 July, the Senate of the Republic approved the confidence vote with 121 votes in favour and 100 against.

=== First government ===
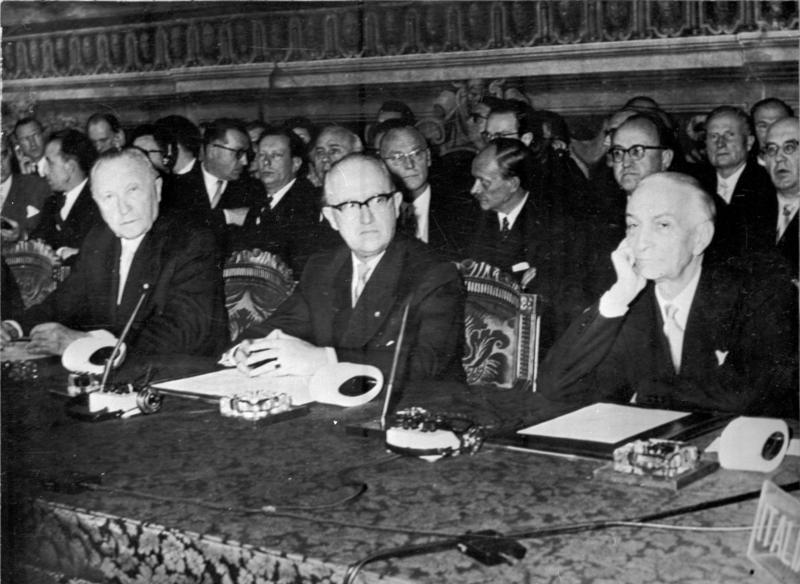
Segni with German chancellor Konrad Adenauer and diplomat Walter Hallstein during the signing of the Treaty of Rome in 1957

Segni's first government is widely considered among the most important cabinets in the history of the Republic. During his premiership, in 1955, Italy became a member of the United Nations (UN) in 1955. In March 1957, Segni signed the Treaty of Rome, which brought about the creation of the European Economic Community (EEC), between Belgium, France, Italy, Luxembourg, the Netherlands, and West Germany. The Treaty of Rome still remains one of the two most important treaties in the modern-day European Union (EU).

Segni had always been a strong supporter of European integration; according to him, in a world governed by great powers, European unity was the only possible way to influence the world. He also strengthened relations with West Germany, becoming a close friend of Konrad Adenauer. As premier, he also had to face the complicated Suez Crisis of 1956, in which he staunchly defended Italy's economic interests in the area, always bearing in mind the need to safeguard Atlantic and European solidarity.

During his premiership, Segni often had conflict with Fanfani, who believed that the government should have a more critical attitude towards the Anglo-French choices. Moreover, the brutal Soviet repression of the Hungarian Revolution of 1956 further divided Segni and Fanfani. Segni opposed an anti-communist legislative intervention, as Fanfani asked. The clash between the two leaders was so bitter that Segni threatened to resign. In his diary, Segni wrote: "The events of Hungary are unfortunately subjected to repressive political speculation. I refuse to speculate on them."

In domestic policy, Segni's government was particularly active in judiciary policies. A law established the National Council of Economy and Labour (CNEL), as well as the Superior Council of the Judiciary. The most important event of all was the official opening of the Constitutional Court of Italy. In 1957, political tensions arose between the Italian president Gronchi and foreign affairs minister Gaetano Martino, regarding government's foreign policy. In May 1957, the PSDI withdrew its support for the government, and Segni resigned on 6 May. On 20 May, Adone Zoli sworn in as new head of government.

=== After the premiership ===
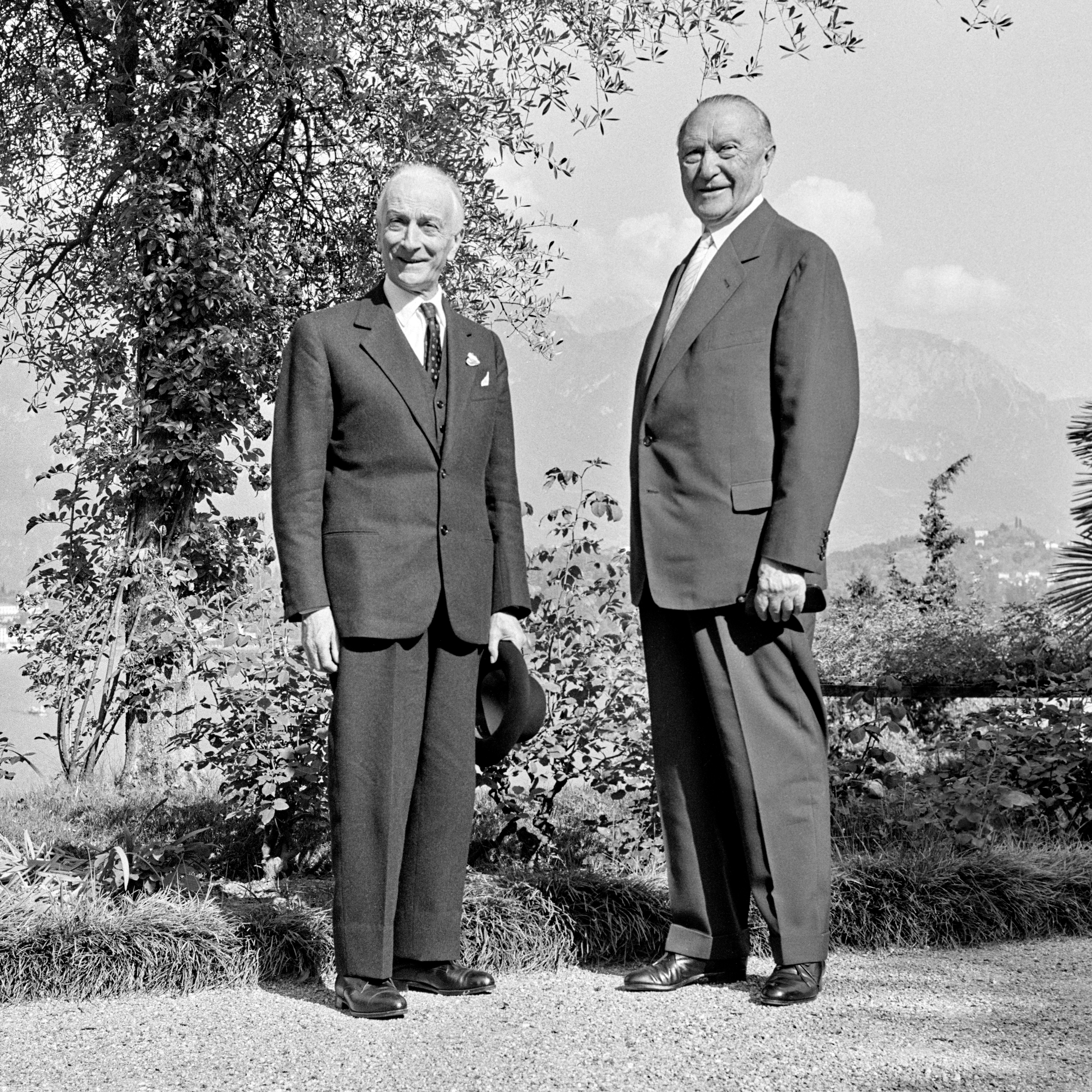
Segni and Adenauer in August 1959

In July 1958, Zoli resigned, after having lost his majority in the Italian Parliament, and Fanfani became the prime minister again. Segni was appointed Deputy Prime Minister of Italy and the country's Minister of Defence.

As minister, Segni worked to represent the interests of the Italian Armed Forces, increasing wages and social securities for retired veterans, as well as strengthening military equipment and weapons. He also accepted NATO missile bases for atomic weapons, convinced that they were a necessary tool to ensure the defence of Italy more than a danger that exposed the country to possible reprisals.

In January 1959, a conspicuous group of Christian Democrats started voting against their own government, forcing Fanfani to resign on 26 January 1959 after six months in power.

=== Second government ===
In February 1959, Gronchi gave Segni the task of forming a new cabinet, and he officially sworn in as the new prime minister on 16 February. Segni formed a one-party government, which was composed only by DC members, and was externally supported by minor centre-right and right-wing parties, as well as the neo-fascist Italian Social Movement (MSI).

Segni attempted to strengthen Atlantic solidarity and to present Italy as Europe's most reliable ally of the United States. He also tried to represent the reassuring alternative to Fanfani's resourcefulness, advocating for Atlanticism in a season characterized by openings to the left, which was supported by Fanfani. The most comforting signals came from the economy, as industry and commerce expanded, unemployment declined, and Italy's GDP grew by over 6%, a rhythm that placed it among the most dynamic countries in the world.

In social policy, various reforms in social welfare were carried out.

In March 1960, the PLI withdrew its support to his government and Segni was forced to resign. After few months of Fernando Tambroni's government, Fanfani returned to the premiership on 26 July, this time with an openly centre-left program supported by the PSI abstention, and Segni was appointed Minister of Foreign Affairs. In August 1961, Segni and Fanfani made an historic trip to Moscow to meet the Soviet leaders.

== President of Italy ==
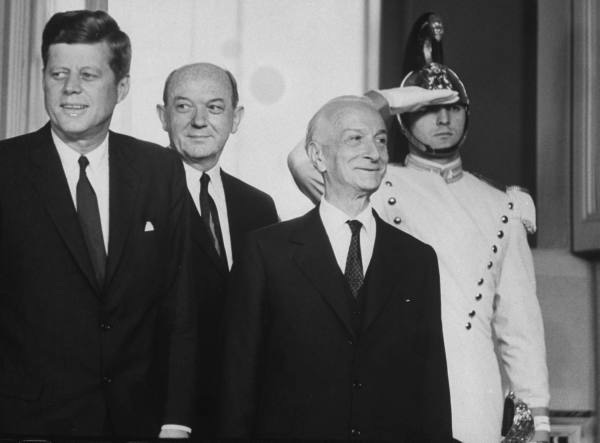
Segni with U.S. president John F. Kennedy in Rome, 1962

In May 1962, when Gronchi's term as president of Italy expired, Segni was proposed as the DC's candidate by new party's leader Aldo Moro for the 1962 presidential election held on 2–6 May. With Segni's choice, Moro wanted to reassure the conservative representatives of his own party, worried about a possible extreme shift on leftist stances, after the beginning of the organic centre-left period in February 1962. On the first two rounds, the Italian Communist Party (PCI) decided to vote for Umberto Terracini, while the PSI supported Sandro Pertini. After the third round, the PCI and PSI decided to converge on the candidacy of the PSDI, Giuseppe Saragat, who gained also the favor of some DC representatives.

After several ballots, Segni was finally elected president on 6 May 1962 with 51% of the votes, 443 votes on a total 854 electors. His election was allowed thanks to the votes of monarchist and neo-fascist representatives. It was the first time that DC's official candidate succeeded in being elected president of the Republic.

Many influent entities, notably including the Bank of Italy, the Armed Forces, Vatican hierarchies, as well as economic and financial world, were concerned about the entry of the PSI into the government, and considered Segni a reference of stability and their most prominent political landmark. His power grew further in the aftermath of the 1963 Italian general election, which was characterized by a loss for the DC due to its new leftist policies. Despite Segni's opposition, at the end of the year, Moro and the PSI secretary Pietro Nenni launched their first centre-left government, ruling the country for more than four years.

=== Vajont Dam disaster ===
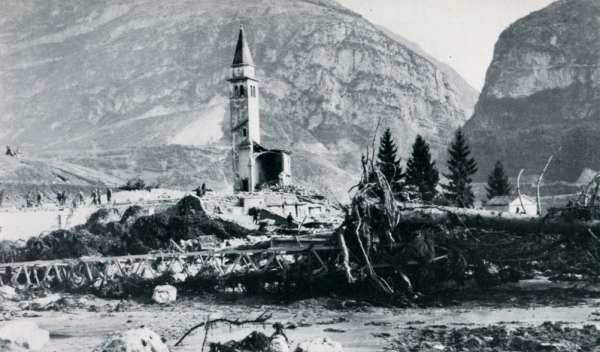
The destroyed town of Longarone after the megatsunami of 1963

As president, Segni had to face one of the most tragic events in Italian republican history, namely the Vajont Dam disaster. On 9 October 1963, a landslide occurred on Monte Toc, in the province of Pordenone. The landslide caused a megatsunami in the artificial lake in which 50 million cubic metres of water overtopped the dam in a wave of 250 metres (820 ft), leading to the complete destruction of several villages and towns, and 1,917 deaths. In the previous months, the Adriatic Society of Electricity (SADE) and the Italian government, which both owned the dam, dismissed evidence and concealed reports describing the geological instability of Monte Toc on the southern side of the basin and other early warning signs reported prior to the disaster.

On the following day, Segni visited the affected areas, promising justice for the victims. Immediately after the disaster, both the government and local authorities insisted on attributing the tragedy to an unexpected and unavoidable natural event. Despite these statements, numerous warnings, signs of danger, and negative appraisals had been disregarded in the previous months and the eventual attempt to safely control the landslide into the lake by lowering its level came when the landslide was almost imminent and was too late to prevent it. The communist newspaper l'Unità was the first to denounce the actions of management and government. The DC accused the PCI of political profiteering from the tragedy and then-prime minister Giovanni Leone promised to bring justice to the people killed in the disaster. A few months after the end of his premiership, he became the head of SADE's team of lawyers, who significantly reduced the amount of compensation for the survivors and ruled out payment for at least 600 victims.

=== 1964 coalition crisis ===
On 25 June 1964, the government of Aldo Moro was beaten on the budget law for the Italian Ministry of Education concerning the financing of private education, and on the same day Moro resigned. During the presidential consultations for the formation of a new cabinet, Segni asked Nenni to exit from the government majority.

On 16 July, Segni sent the Carabinieri General Giovanni De Lorenzo to a meeting of representatives of the DC, to deliver a message in case the negotiations around the formation of a new centre-left government would fail. According to some historians, De Lorenzo reported that Segni was ready to give a subsequent mandate to Cesare Merzagora, the president of the Senate, asking him of forming a president's government composed by all the conservative forces in the Italian Parliament. Ultimately, Moro managed to form another centre-left majority. During the negotiations, Nenni had accepted the downsizing of his reform programs. On 17 July, Moro went to the Quirinal Palace, with the acceptance of the assignment and the list of ministers of his second government.

=== Illness and resignation ===
On 7 August 1964, during a meeting at the Quirinal Palace with Moro and Saragat, Segni suffered a serious cerebral hemorrhage. At the time, he was 73 years old and the first prognosis was not positive. In the interim, Merzagora served as Acting President of the Republic. Segni only partially recovered and decided to retire from office on 6 December 1964. Immediately after his resignation, Segni was appointed senator for life ex officio. The 1964 Italian presidential election resulted in the election of Saragat on 29 December.

== Death and legacy ==
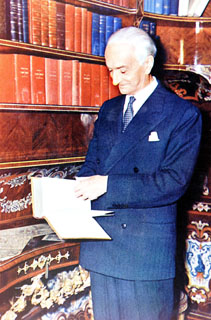
Segni at the Quirinal Palace's library

On 1 December 1972, Segni died in Rome at the age of 81.

During all his political career, Segni acted as a moderate conservative, staunchly opposing the "opening to the left" proposed by Fanfani and Moro, but he also tried not to bring his own party too far to the right. He was the first Italian president to resign from office.

The frail, often ailing Segni, was affectionately called il malato di ferro, which literally means "the iron invalid". Time once quoted a friend of his: "He is like the Colosseum; he looks like a ruin but he'll be around for a long time."

=== Controversies ===
During his presidency, Segni was particularly influenced by General Giovanni De Lorenzo, commander of the Carabinieri, a former partisan with monarchical ideals. On 25 March 1964, De Lorenzo met with Carabinieri's commanders of the divisions of Milan, Rome, and Naples, proposing a response to a hypothetical national crisis, known as Piano Solo. The plan consisted of a set of measures to occupy certain institutions, such as Quirinal Palace in Rome, and essential media infrastructures, like television and radio, as well as the neutralisation of communist and socialist parties, with the deportation of hundreds of left-wing politicians to a secret military base in Sardinia. The list of people to be deported also included intellectuals, such as Pier Paolo Pasolini.

On 10 May, De Lorenzo presented his plan to Segni, who was particularly impressed by it. Journalists Giorgio Galli and Indro Montanelli believed that Segni did not really want to carry out a coup d'état, but that he wanted to use the plan like a threat for political purposes. The coup plans were revealed in 1967, when the journalists Eugenio Scalfari and Lino Jannuzzi published the plan in the Italian news magazine L'Espresso in May 1967. The results of the official investigation remained classified until the early 1990s. It was released by premier Giulio Andreotti to the parliamentary investigation into Operation Gladio. L'Espresso mentioned that some 20,000 Carabinieri were supposed to be deployed around the country, with more than 5,000 agents in Rome. Segni was never investigated for this fact.

== Electoral history ==
Election	House	Constituency	Party	Votes	Result
1924	Chamber of Deputies	Sardinia	PPI	—N/a	Not elected
1946	Constituent Assembly	Cagliari–Sassari–Nuoro	DC	40,394	Elected
1948	Chamber of Deputies	Cagliari–Sassari–Nuoro	DC	61,168	Elected
1953	Chamber of Deputies	Cagliari–Sassari–Nuoro	DC	77,306	Elected
1958	Chamber of Deputies	Cagliari–Sassari–Nuoro	DC	107,054	Elected

=== Presidential elections ===
1962 presidential election (9th ballot)
Candidate	Supported by	Votes	%
Antonio Segni	DC, MSI, PDIUM	443	51.9
Giuseppe Saragat	PSDI, PSI, PCI, PRI	334	39.1
Others / Invalid votes		77	9.0
Total		854	100.0

Academic offices
Preceded by Carlo Gastaldi	Rector of the University of Sassari; 1943–1951	Succeeded by Cataldo Zummo
Political offices
Preceded by Fausto Gullo	Minister of Agriculture; 1946–1951	Succeeded by Amintore Fanfani
Preceded by Guido Gonella	Minister of Public Education; 1951–1953	Succeeded by Giuseppe Bettiol
Preceded by Giuseppe Bettiol	Minister of Public Education; 1953–1954	Succeeded by Egidio Tosato
Preceded by Mario Scelba	Prime Minister of Italy; 1955–1957	Succeeded by Adone Zoli
Preceded by Giuseppe Pella	Deputy Prime Minister of Italy; 1958–1959	Vacant Title next held by Attilio Piccioni
Preceded by Paolo Emilio Taviani	Minister of Defence; 1958–1959	Succeeded by Giulio Andreotti
Preceded by Amintore Fanfani	Prime Minister of Italy; 1959–1960	Succeeded by Fernando Tambroni
Preceded by Fernando Tambroni	Minister of the Interior; 1959–1960	Succeeded by Giuseppe Spataro
Preceded by Giuseppe Pella	Minister of Foreign Affairs; 1960–1962	Succeeded by Amintore Fanfani; Acting
Preceded by Giovanni Gronchi	President of Italy; 1962–1964	Succeeded by Giuseppe Saragat
Awards
Preceded by Edward Heath	Recipient of the Charlemagne Prize; 1964	Succeeded by Jens Otto Krag
