= Giuseppe Pella =

Italian politician (1902–1981)

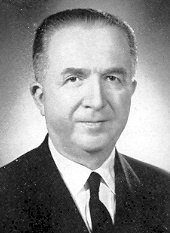

Prime Minister of Italy
- In office 17 August 1953 – 19 January 1954
- President: Luigi Einaudi
- Preceded by: Alcide De Gasperi
- Succeeded by: Amintore Fanfani

Deputy Prime Minister of Italy
- In office 20 May 1957 – 2 July 1958
- Prime Minister: Adone Zoli
- Preceded by: Giuseppe Saragat
- Succeeded by: Antonio Segni

President of the Common Assembly
- In office 29 November 1954 – 27 November 1956
- Preceded by: Alcide De Gasperi
- Succeeded by: Hans Furler
Ministerial offices
Minister of Finance
In office 18 February 1972 – 26 June 1972
Prime Minister	Giulio Andreotti
Preceded by	Luigi Preti
Succeeded by	Athos Valsecchi
In office 1 June 1947 – 24 May 1948
Prime Minister	Alcide De Gasperi
Preceded by	Luigi Einaudi
Succeeded by	Ezio Vanoni
Minister of Budget
In office 27 July 1960 – 22 February 1962
Prime Minister	Amintore Fanfani
Preceded by	Fernando Tambroni
Succeeded by	Ugo La Malfa
In office 24 May 1948 – 19 January 1954
Prime Minister	Alcide De Gasperi; Himself
Preceded by	Luigi Einaudi
Succeeded by	Ezio Vanoni
Minister of Foreign Affairs
In office 16 February 1959 – 26 March 1960
Prime Minister	Antonio Segni
Preceded by	Amintore Fanfani
Succeeded by	Antonio Segni
In office 20 May 1957 – 2 July 1958
Prime Minister	Adone Zoli
Preceded by	Gaetano Martino
Succeeded by	Amintore Fanfani
In office 17 August 1953 – 19 January 1954
Prime Minister	Himself
Preceded by	Alcide De Gasperi
Succeeded by	Attilio Piccioni
Minister of the Treasury
In office 2 February 1952 – 17 August 1953
Prime Minister	Alcide De Gasperi
Preceded by	Ezio Vanoni
Succeeded by	Silvio Gava
In office 24 May 1948 – 26 July 1951
Prime Minister	Alcide De Gasperi
Preceded by	Gustavo Del Vecchio
Succeeded by	Ezio Vanoni
Parliamentary offices
Member of the Senate of the Republic
In office 5 June 1968 – 4 July 1976
Constituency	Mondovì
Member of the Chamber of Deputies
In office 8 May 1948 – 4 June 1968
Constituency	Turin–Novara–Vercelli
Member of the Constituent Assembly
In office 25 June 1946 – 31 January 1948
Constituency	Turin–Novara–Vercelli

Personal details
- Born: 18 April 1902 Valdengo, Piedmont, Kingdom of Italy
- Died: 31 May 1981 (aged 79) Rome, Lazio, Italy
- Party: Christian Democracy
- Spouse: Ines Cardolle (m. 1934)
- Children: 1
- Occupation: Tax advisor, politician

Giuseppe Pella (Italian: [dʒuˈzɛppe ˈpɛlla]; 18 April 1902 – 31 May 1981) was an Italian Christian Democratic politician and statesman who served as the 31st prime minister of Italy from 1953 to 1954. He was also Minister of Treasury, Budget and of Foreign Affairs during the 1950s and early 1960s. Pella served as President of the European Parliament from 1954 to 1956 after the death of Alcide De Gasperi.

Pella is widely considered one of the most important politicians in Italy's post-war history. His laissez-faire economic and monetary policies strongly influenced the Italian reconstruction and the subsequent economic miracle.

== Early life and career ==
Giuseppe Pella was born in Valdengo, Piedmont. He was the second son of Luigi Pella and Viglielmina Bona, sharecroppers in a small farm. After having obtained his elementary school certificate privately, he attended the three-year period of technical schools in Biella and then an accounting Institute in Turin. After graduating in Economy and Commerce at the Royal Superior Institute of Turin in 1924, he became a professor of accounting at the Sapienza University of Rome and University of Turin. He also started working as tax advisor and auditor.

Under the regime of Benito Mussolini, Pella was forced to join the National Fascist Party (PNF), to continue his occupation as tax advisor and professor. As a fascist, he was appointed member of the Governing Council of the Fascist Culture Provincial Institute of Biella and consultant of the municipality of Biella. In the late 1930s he was appointment deputy podestà of Biella, with the task of reorganizing city's financial system.

In 1934, Pella married Ines Maria Cardolle, from whom he had a daughter, Wanda, born in 1938.

During the Italian Civil War, Pella started cooperating with the National Liberation Committee (CLN), a political umbrella organization and the main representative of the Italian resistance movement fighting against the German occupation of Italy in the aftermath of the armistice of Cassibile. After the end of the World War II, he joined the Christian Democracy (DC), led by Alcide De Gasperi, becoming one of the main members of the party's right wing. After the 1946 general election, he became a member of the Constituent Assembly of Italy. In July 1946, he was appointed under-secretary of Finances in the second and third governments of De Gasperi. On 6 June 1947, De Gasperi appointed him Minister of Finance in his fourth cabinet.

=== Minister of Treasury and Budget ===
From May 1948 until January 1954 Pella served as Minister of Budget under the premiership of Alcide De Gasperi. Moreover, from May 1948 until July 1951 and again from February 1952 to August 1953, he also served as Minister of Treasury. As minister he implemented liberist and monetarist policies, characterized by a strong laissez-faire capitalism, which gained him the enmity of the Italian Communist Party (PCI) and Italian Socialist Party (PSI), as well as harsh criticism from members of Christian Democracy's left-wing, like Giuseppe Dossetti and Giorgio La Pira. The American experts of the Marshall Plan, who arrived in Rome to check the use of Plan's funds, were disconcerted that not a dollar had been spent on a Roosevelt-like public spending policy: the funds had in fact been used exclusively to bring order to the public finance and to stabilize the state budget following the thought of Luigi Einaudi.

== Prime Minister of Italy ==
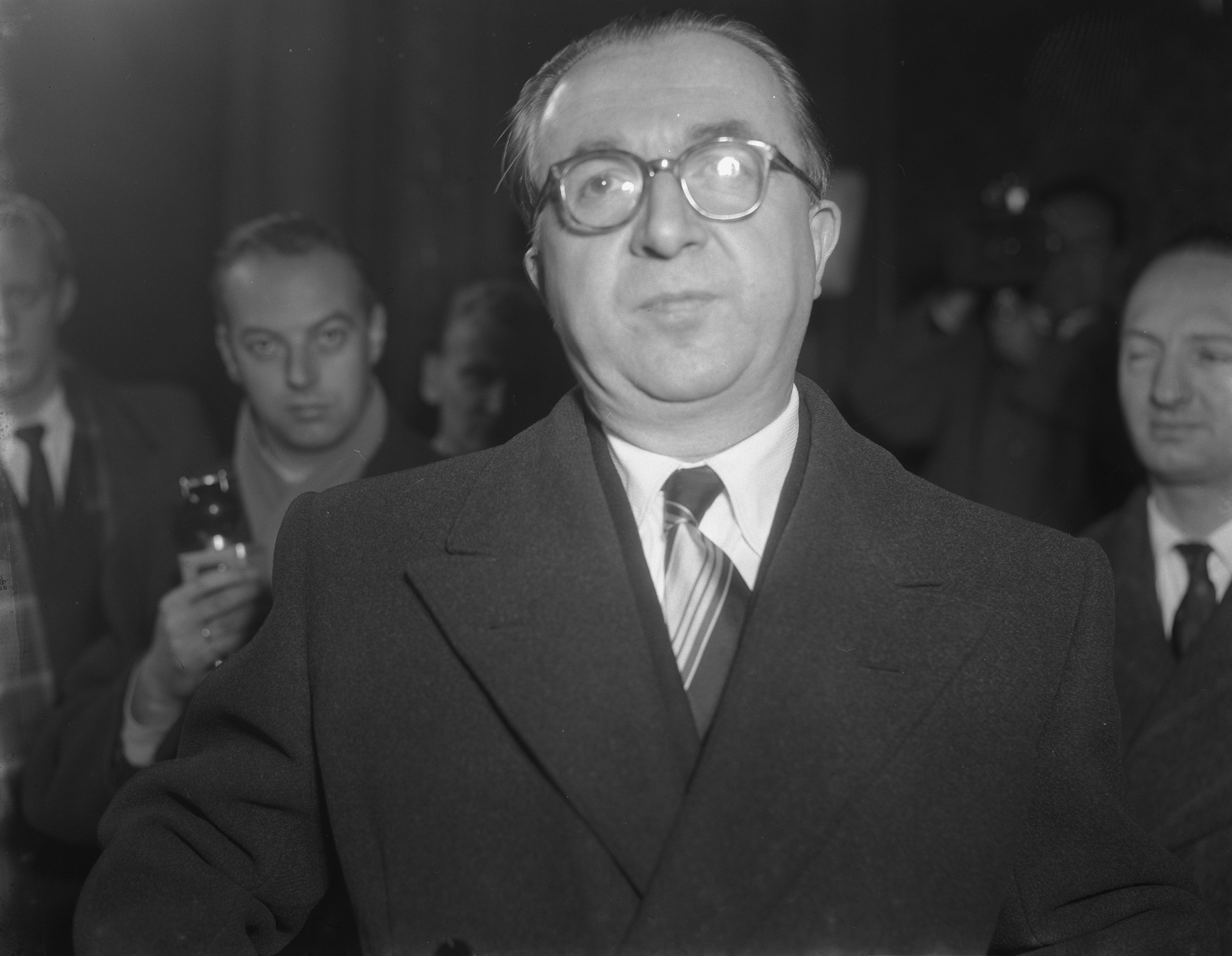
Giuseppe Pella in 1953

The 1953 general election was characterised by changes in the electoral law. Even if the general structure remained uncorrupted, the government introduced a superbonus of two thirds of seats in the House for the coalition which would obtain at-large the absolute majority of votes. The change was strongly opposed by the opposition parties as well as DC's smaller coalition partners, who had no realistic chance of success under this system. The new law was called the Scam Law by its detractors, including some dissidents of minor government parties who founded special opposition groups to deny the artificial landslide to Christian Democracy.

In the 7 June election, the government coalition won 49.9% of national vote, just a few thousand votes of the threshold for a supermajority, resulting in an ordinary proportional distribution of the seats. Technically, the government won the election, winning a clear working majority of seats in both houses, but frustration with the failure to win a supermajority caused significant tensions in the leading coalition, which ended on 2 August, when De Gasperi was forced to resign by the Parliament. On 17 August, President Einaudi appointed Pella as new Prime Minister. Pella Cabinet was immediately labeled as "administrative government", with the only aim of approving the budget law. As premier, he also served as ad interim Minister of Budget and Foreign Affairs.

Pella gained further critics when, by issuing nationalistic declarations, he created strife with Josip Broz Tito regarding the Free Territory of Trieste. The Yugoslav president declared he would have invaded Trieste if the Americans had assigned it to Italy. Then, Pella threatened to send troops to the Eastern border in response to Tito's provocation. The crisis that could result in a military confrontation was brought back after many diplomatic efforts by the Western powers. His interventionism provoked opposite reactions in Parliament and in the press: Monarchist National Party (PNM) and the neo-fascist Italian Social Movement (MSI) strongly supported him, while the leftist parties, and especially the communists, accused him of nationalism and anti-communism. Much of his own party remained neutral, partly because the governments of United States and United Kingdom wanted to keep good relations with Yugoslavia even at the cost of penalizing Italy. The media, however, described Pella as a patriot and as a courageous statesman. Much of the public opinion appreciated his policies.

On 12 January 1954, after only 5 months in power, a strong confrontation with many members of DC, regarding the appointment of Salvatore Aldisio as new Minister of Agriculture, forced Pella to resign.

== After the premiership ==
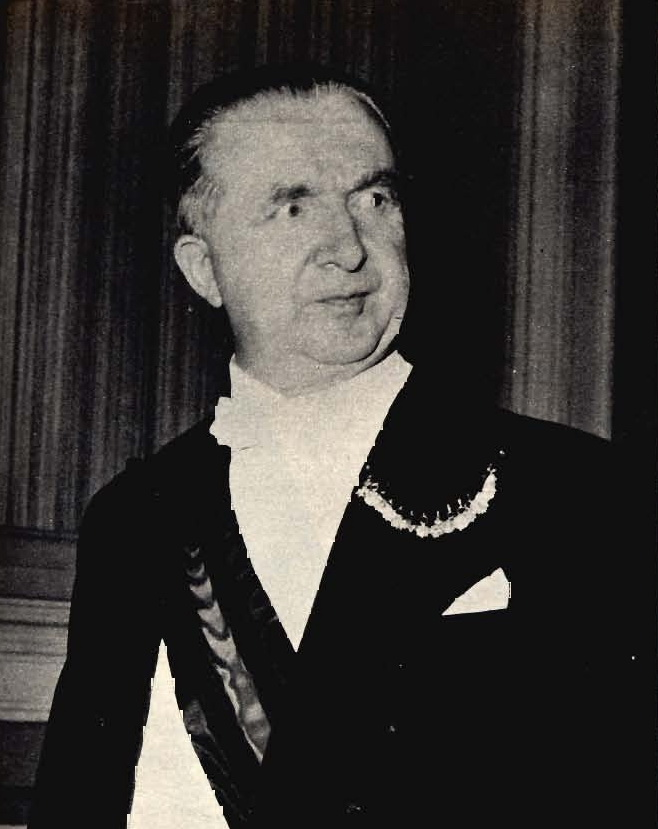
Giuseppe Pella in 1961

After the end of his government, in November 1954, Pella was elected President of the Common Assembly, the plenary assembly of European Coal and Steel Community (ECSC), which had been considered as the prototype of the European Parliament. He hold the office until November 1956. His pro-European vision was clearly outlined already in the inauguration speech as president, where he sustained the need to create a Europe "inspired by the concept of supernationality, built not against nations but with the sincere collaboration of nations." Few years later, discussing about his years at the head of the European institution, he stated that he always held his office "with the determination to pursue the strategic plan of a progressive transfer of sovereignty from the member States to the European institutions."

In 1954, he founded, along with Giulio Andreotti, a right-wing faction of Christian Democracy, known as "Concentration". In 1955 he was one of the kingmakers of Giovanni Gronchi's election to the Presidency of the Republic, against Cesare Merzagora, who was the candidate proposed by the Christian Democratic secretary, Amintore Fanfani. Pella and Andreotti's move gained the surprising support of communist and socialist parties, as well as the one monarchist and neo-fascist movements. After Gronchi's sworn in, Pella was considered the natural candidate for the premiership, however the new President of the Republic appointed Antonio Segni.

In May 1957, Pella served as Minister of Foreign Affairs in the government of Adone Zoli, of whom he served also as Deputy Prime Minister. He became Foreign Affairs Minister again under Segni, from February 1959 until March 1960, and Minister of Budget in Fanfani III Cabinet from July 1960 to February 1962.

A strong opponent of Fanfani's alliance with the Socialist Party, from 1962 he decided to keep aside. In the later years, he became president of the Senate Foreign Affairs Committee from 18 July 1968 to 23 February 1972 and briefly returned to the government as Finance Minister in the first government of Giulio Andreotti from February to June 1972, which however failed to gain confidence by the Parliament.

After leaving politics in 1976, he continued his role of President of "National Association of Insurance Institutes" and of the "Association of Tax Advisors and Accountants". He also led "Piemonte Italia", a promotional institute of studies on the regional economy, which he founded in the 1960s.

Pella died on 31 May 1981 in Rome, at the age of 79.

== Electoral history ==
Election	House	Constituency	Party	Votes	Result
1946	Constituent Assembly	Turin–Novara–Vercelli	DC	25,632	Elected
1948	Chamber of Deputies	Turin–Novara–Vercelli	DC	50,814	Elected
1953	Chamber of Deputies	Turin–Novara–Vercelli	DC	68,864	Elected
1958	Chamber of Deputies	Turin–Novara–Vercelli	DC	112,759	Elected
1963	Chamber of Deputies	Turin–Novara–Vercelli	DC	95,739	Elected
1968	Senate of the Republic	Mondovì	DC	51,250	Elected
1972	Senate of the Republic	Mondovì	DC	52,141	Elected

== Notes ==
Political offices
Preceded by Luigi Einaudi	Minister of Finance; 1947–1948	Succeeded by Ezio Vanoni
Preceded by Gustavo Del Vecchio	Minister of Treasury; 1948–1951	Succeeded by Ezio Vanoni
Preceded by Luigi Einaudi	Minister of Budget; 1948–1954	Succeeded by Ezio Vanoni
Preceded by Ezio Vanoni	Minister of Treasury; 1952–1953	Succeeded by Silvio Gava
Preceded by Alcide De Gasperi	Prime Minister of Italy; 1953–1954	Succeeded by Amintore Fanfani
Preceded by Alcide De Gasperi	Minister of Foreign Affairs; 1953–1954	Succeeded by Attilio Piccioni
Preceded by Alcide De Gasperi	President of the Common Assembly; 1954–1956	Succeeded by Hans Furler
Preceded by Giuseppe Saragat	Deputy Prime Minister of Italy; 1957–1958	Succeeded by Antonio Segni
Preceded by Gaetano Martino	Minister of Foreign Affairs; 1957–1958	Succeeded by Amintore Fanfani
Preceded by Amintore Fanfani	Minister of Foreign Affairs; 1959–1960	Succeeded by Antonio Segni
Preceded by Fernando Tambroni	Minister of Budget; 1960–1962	Succeeded by Ugo La Malfa
