= Luigi Einaudi =

President of Italy from 1948 to 1955

Luigi Einaudi OMRI
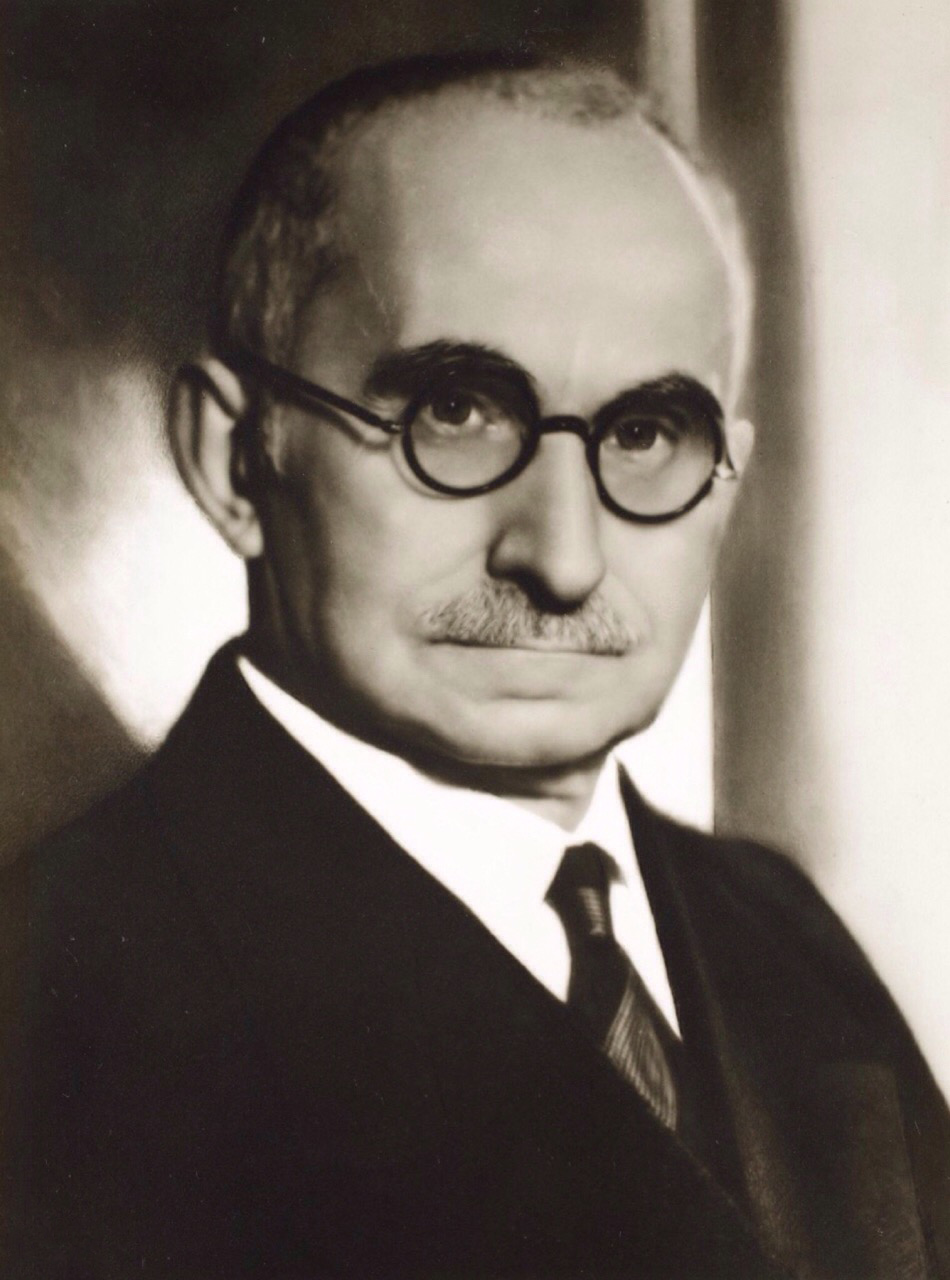
- Official portrait, 1948

President of Italy
- In office 12 May 1948 – 11 May 1955
- Prime Minister: Alcide De Gasperi; Giuseppe Pella; Amintore Fanfani; Mario Scelba
- Preceded by: Enrico De Nicola
- Succeeded by: Giovanni Gronchi

Deputy Prime Minister of Italy
- In office 1 June 1947 – 11 May 1948
- Prime Minister: Alcide De Gasperi
- Preceded by: Office established
- Succeeded by: Giovanni Porzio

Minister of the Budget
- In office 6 June 1947 – 11 May 1948
- Prime Minister: Alcide De Gasperi
- Preceded by: Office established
- Succeeded by: Giuseppe Pella

Governor of the Bank of Italy
- In office 5 January 1945 – 11 May 1948
- Preceded by: Vincenzo Azzolini
- Succeeded by: Donato Menichella
Parliamentary offices
Member of the Senate of the Republic
Ex officio
Life tenure 11 May 1955 – 30 October 1961
Member of the Constituent Assembly
In office 25 June 1946 – 31 January 1948
Constituency	Italy at-large
Member of the Senate of the Kingdom
In office 6 October 1919 – 24 June 1946
Appointed by	Victor Emmanuel III

Personal details
- Born: 24 March 1874 Carrù, Piedmont, Kingdom of Italy
- Died: 30 October 1961 (aged 87) Rome, Lazio, Italy
- Party: Italian Liberal Party
- Spouse: Ida Pellegrini
- Children: Giulio; Mario; Roberto
- Education: Liceo classico Cavour; University of Turin
- Profession: Teacher; economist

Luigi Numa Lorenzo Einaudi (Italian: [luˈiːdʒi eiˈnaudi]; 24 March 1874 – 30 October 1961) was an Italian politician, economist and banker who served as the president of Italy from 1948 to 1955 and is considered one of the founding fathers of the Italian Republic.

== Early life ==
Einaudi was born to Lorenzo Einaudi and Placida Fracchia in Carrù, in the province of Cuneo, Piedmont. In Turin he attended Liceo classico Cavour and completed his university studies; in the same years he became acquainted with socialist ideas and collaborated with the magazine Critica sociale, directed by the socialist leader Filippo Turati. In 1895, after overcoming financial difficulties, he graduated in jurisprudence, and was later appointed a professor in the University of Turin, the Polytechnic University of Turin and the Bocconi University of Milan.

As an economist, Einaudi belonged to the classical school of economics in addition to Pietro Campilli, Epicarmo Corbino and Gustavo Del Vecchio.

== Early political life ==
From the early 20th century, Einaudi moved increasingly towards a more conservative stance. In 1919 he was named Senator of the Kingdom of Italy. He also worked as a journalist for important Italian newspapers such as La Stampa and Il Corriere della Sera, as well as being financial correspondent for The Economist. In 1925, he signed the Anti-Fascist Intellectuals Manifesto. As an anti-fascist, he stopped working for Italian newspapers from 1926, under the fascist regime, resuming his professional relationship with the Corriere della Sera after the fall of the regime in 1943. After the Armistice (8 September 1943) he fled to Switzerland, returning to Italy in 1944. In Switzerland, Einaudi taught economics at the Geneva Graduate Institute.

Einaudi was Governor of the Bank of Italy from 5 January 1945 until 11 May 1948, and was also a founding member of the Consulta Nazionale which opened the way to the new Parliament of the Italian Republic after World War II. Later he was Minister of Finances, Treasury and Balance, as well as Vice-Premier, in 1947–48. He was also a member of the neo-liberal think tank the Mont Pelerin Society.

Einaudi was elected an International Honorary Member of the American Academy of Arts and Sciences in 1935 and an International Member of the American Philosophical Society in 1947.

== President (1948–1955) ==
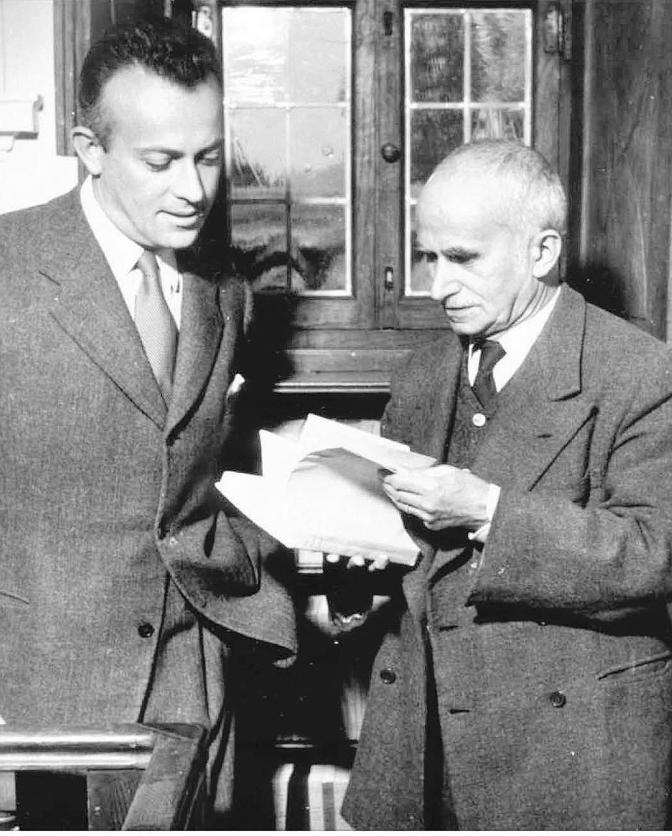
Luigi Einaudi with his son Giulio in 1951

On 11 May 1948, he was elected the second President of the Italian Republic. At the end of the seven-year term of office in 1955, he became a Life Senator. Einaudi was a member of numerous cultural, economic and university institutions.

A staunch liberal in the European, libertarian sense (he invented the Italian term "liberismo" to mean economic liberalism, arguing with Benedetto Croce), he was a supporter of the idea of European Federalism.

Einaudi personally managed the activities of his farm near Dogliani, which produced Nebbiolo wine, and he boasted to be using the most advanced agricultural developments. In 1950, the monarchist satirical magazine Candido published a cartoon in which Einaudi was at the Quirinal Palace, surrounded by a presidential guard of honour (the corazzieri) of giant bottles of Nebbiolo wine, each labelled with the institutional logo. The cartoon was judged a lèse-majesté by a court of the time, and Giovannino Guareschi, the director of the magazine, was held responsible and sentenced.

== Personal life ==
Einaudi married Countess Ida Pellegrini (1885–1968) on 19 December 1903. Pellegrini was born in Pescantina in 1885 into a family of the Veronese aristocracy, as she was the daughter of Count Giulio Pellegrini. She attended the Regia School of Commerce in Turin, where she met her future husband, who was her professor at the time. Their son Giulio became a prominent Italian publisher, and their grandson Ludovico is a neo-Classical musician. Their son Roberto, a mechanical engineer, continued to cultivate his father's beloved winery.

Their son Mario was a Cornell University professor and active anti-fascist. The Mario Einaudi Center for International Studies is named after him. Additionally, Mario founded the Fondazione Luigi Einaudi in Turin in honour of his father. His son is diplomat Luigi R. Einaudi.

The Einaudi Institute for Economics and Finance (EIEF), a research centre of the Bank of Italy, is named after Luigi Einaudi.

Einaudi died in Rome on 30 October 1961 at the age of 87.

== Bibliography ==
- Principi di scienza delle finanze (1932)
- Il buon governo (1954)
- Prediche inutili (1956–1959)
- Luigi Einaudi (12 November 1919). "Tracotanze protezionistiche". Corriere della Sera.
- Luigi Einaudi (17 July 1944). Via il Prefetto! (Thesis). Gazzetta ticinese.
- Luigi Einuadi (30 September 2016). On Abstract and Historical Hypotheses and on Value Judgments in Economic Sciences. New York-London: Routledge. p. 156. ISBN 978-0-415-51790-4.

== Sources ==
- Acocella, N. (ed.), "Luigi Einaudi: studioso, statista, governatore", Carocci, Roma, 2010, ISBN 978-88-430-5660-6.
- Forte, F.; Marchionatti, R. (2012). "Luigi Einaudi's economics of liberalism". The European Journal of the History of Economic Thought. 19 (4): 587–624. doi:10.1080/09672567.2010.540346. hdl:2318/90412.
- Giordano, A. (2004), Luigi Einaudi and the Dilemmas of Liberal Democracy, Notizie di Politeia, XX, 2004, n. 75, pp. 7–12 (http://www-4.unipv.it/paviagc/?page_id=236).
- Silvestri, Paolo The ideal of good government in Luigi Einaudi's Thought and Life: Between Law and Freedom, in Paolo Heritier, Paolo Silvestri (Eds.), Good government, Governance, Human complexity. Luigi Einaudi's legacy and contemporary societies, Leo Olschki, Firenze, 2012, pp. 55–95. ISBN 978-88-222-6161-8
- Silvestri, Paolo, "Preface", in L. Einaudi, On Abstract and Historical Hypotheses and on Value judgments in Economic Sciences, Routledge, London – New York, 2017, pp. XXIV-XXXII.
- Silvestri, Paolo, "The defence of economic science and the issue of value judgments", in L. Einaudi, On Abstract and Historical Hypotheses and on Value judgments in Economic Sciences, Routledge, London – New York, 2017, pp. 1–34.
- Silvestri Paolo, "Freedom and taxation between good and bad polity, and the economist-whole-man", in L. Einaudi, On Abstract and Historical Hypotheses and on Value judgments in Economic Sciences, Routledge, London – New York, 2017, pp. 94–136.

Government offices
Preceded by Vincenzo Azzolini	Governor of the Bank of Italy; 1945–1948	Succeeded by Donato Menichella
Political offices
New office	Minister of the Budget; 1947–1948	Succeeded by Giuseppe Pella
Preceded by Enrico De Nicola	President of Italy; 1948–1955	Succeeded by Giovanni Gronchi
