= Third Andreotti government =

33rd government of the Italian Republic

Andreotti III Cabinet
- 33rd Cabinet of Italy

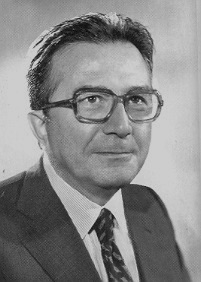
- Date formed: 30 July 1976
- Date dissolved: 13 March 1978

People and organisations
- Head of state: Giovanni Leone
- Head of government: Giulio Andreotti
- Member parties: DC; Abstention: PCI, PSI, PSDI, PRI, PLI
- Status in legislature: Minority government
- Opposition parties: MSI, DP, PR

History
- Election: 1976 election
- Legislature term: VII Legislature (1976–1979)
- Predecessor: Fifth Moro government
- Successor: Fourth Andreotti government

The third Andreotti government, also known as the government of non no-confidence (Italian: governo della non sfiducia) or government of national solidarity (Italian: governo di solidarietà nazionale), was the 33rd cabinet of the Italian Republic. The first government in the history of the Italian Republic to count among its members a woman, Tina Anselmi as Minister of Labour and Social Security, it held office from 1976 to 1978.

The third Andreotti government obtained the confidence in the Senate of the Republic on 6 August 1976, with 136 votes in favour, 17 against, and 69 abstentions, and in the Chamber of Deputies on 9 August 1976, with 258 votes in favour, 44 against, and 303 abstentions. It was a single-party government composed only of members of Christian Democracy (DC); it was known as the government of non no-confidence because it obtained the vote of confidence in the Italian Parliament thanks to the abstentionism of the Italian Communist Party (PCI) led by Enrico Berlinguer. The third Andreotti government fell on 31 January 1978 due to the withdrawal of support from the PCI, which wanted to be directly involved in the government, a proposal rejected by the DC.

== Composition ==
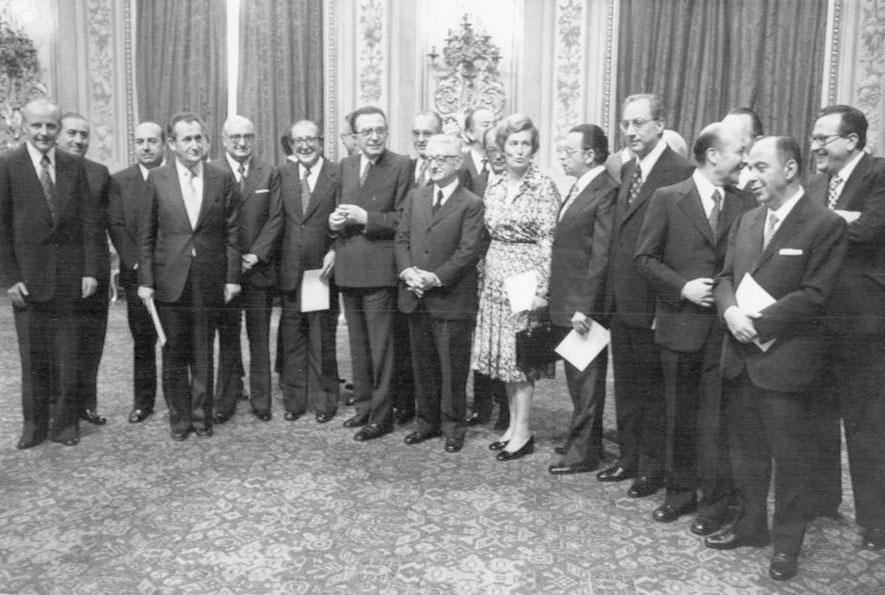
Official photo of the third Andreotti government after the oath at the Quirinal Palace

| Portrait | Office | Name | Term | Party | Undersecretaries |
|---|---|---|---|---|---|
| | Prime Minister | Giulio Andreotti | 30 July 1976 – 13 March 1978 | Christian Democracy | Franco Evangelisti (DC); Piergiorgio Bressani (DC); Gian Aldo Arnaud (DC); Ignazio Vincenzo Senese (DC) |
| | Minister of Foreign Affairs | Arnaldo Forlani | 30 July 1976 – 13 March 1978 | Christian Democracy | Franco Foschi (DC); Luciano Radi (DC) |
| | Minister of the Interior | Francesco Cossiga | 30 July 1976 – 13 March 1978 | Christian Democracy | Clelio Darida (DC); Nicola Lettieri (DC); Giuseppe Zamberletti (DC) (until 15 September 1977) |
| | Minister of Grace and Justice | Francesco Paolo Bonifacio | 30 July 1976 – 13 March 1978 | Christian Democracy | Renato Dell'Andro (DC); Edoardo Speranza (DC) |
| | Minister of Budget and Economic Planning | Tommaso Morlino | 30 July 1976 – 13 March 1978 | Christian Democracy | Vincenzo Scotti (DC) |
| | Minister of Finance | Filippo Maria Pandolfi | 30 July 1976 – 13 March 1978 | Christian Democracy | Giuseppe Azzaro (DC); Carmelo Santalco (DC); Rodolfo Tambroni Armaroli (DC) |
| | Minister of Treasury | Gaetano Stammati | 30 July 1976 – 13 March 1978 | Christian Democracy | Lucio Abis (DC); Renato Corà (DC); Antonio Mario Mazzarrino (DC) |
| | Minister of Defence | Vito Lattanzio | 30 July 1976 – 18 September 1977 | Christian Democracy | Giuseppe Caroli (DC); Carlo Pastorino (DC); Amerigo Petrucci (DC) |
| | Minister of Defence | Attilio Ruffini | 18 September 1977 – 13 March 1978 | Christian Democracy | Giuseppe Caroli (DC); Carlo Pastorino (DC); Amerigo Petrucci (DC) |
| | Minister of Public Education | Franco Maria Malfatti | 30 July 1976 – 13 March 1978 | Christian Democracy | Carlo Buzzi (DC); Franca Falcucci (DC); Giovanni Del Rio (DC) |
| | Minister of Public Works | Antonino Pietro Gullotti | 30 July 1976 – 13 March 1978 | Christian Democracy | Antonio Laforgia (DC); Pietro Padula (DC) |
| | Minister of Agriculture and Forests | Giovanni Marcora | 30 July 1976 – 13 March 1978 | Christian Democracy | Arcangelo Lobianco (DC); Roberto Mazzotta (DC) (until 24 February 1977); Giuseppe Zurlo (DC) (since 24 February 1977) |
| | Minister of Transport | Attilio Ruffini | 30 July 1976 – 18 September 1977 | Christian Democracy | Gianni Fontana (DC); Costante Degan (DC) |
| | Minister of Transport | Vito Lattanzio | 18 September 1977 – 13 March 1978 | Christian Democracy | Gianni Fontana (DC); Costante Degan (DC) |
| | Minister of Merchant Navy | Francesco Fabbri | 30 July 1976 – 20 January 1977 | Christian Democracy | Gianni Fontana (DC); Costante Degan (DC) |
| | Minister of Merchant Navy | Attilio Ruffini (ad interim) | 20 January 1977 – 18 September 1977 | Christian Democracy | Gianni Fontana (DC); Costante Degan (DC) |
| | Minister of Merchant Navy | Vito Lattanzio (ad interim) | 18 September 1977 – 13 March 1978 | Christian Democracy | Gianni Fontana (DC); Costante Degan (DC) |
| | Minister of Post and Telecommunications | Vittorino Colombo | 30 July 1976 – 13 March 1978 | Christian Democracy | Giuseppe Antonio Dal Maso (DC); Elio Tiriolo (DC) |
| | Minister of Industry, Commerce, and Craftsmanship | Carlo Donat-Cattin | 30 July 1976 – 13 March 1978 | Christian Democracy | Enzo Erminero (DC); Gianuario Carta (DC) |
| | Minister of Health | Luciano Dal Falco | 30 July 1976 – 13 March 1978 | Christian Democracy | Ferdinando Russo (DC); Giuseppe Zurlo (DC) (until 24 February 1977) |
| | Minister of Foreign Trade | Rinaldo Ossola | 30 July 1976 – 13 March 1978 | Independent | Luigi Michele Galli (DC) |
| | Minister of State Holdings | Antonio Bisaglia | 30 July 1976 – 13 March 1978 | Christian Democracy | Francesco Bova (DC); Angelo Castelli (DC) |
| | Minister of Labour and Social Security | Tina Anselmi | 30 July 1976 – 13 March 1978 | Christian Democracy | Nino Cristofori (DC); Francesco Smurra (DC); Baldassare Armato (DC); Manfredi Bosco (DC) |
| | Minister of Cultural and Environmental Heritage | Mario Pedini | 30 July 1976 – 13 March 1978 | Christian Democracy | Giorgio Postal (DC); Giorgio Spitella (DC) |
| | Minister of Tourism and Entertainment | Dario Antoniozzi | 30 July 1976 – 13 March 1978 | Christian Democracy | Carlo Sangalli (DC) |
| | Minister for Extraordinary Interventions in the South (without portfolio) | Ciriaco De Mita | 30 July 1976 – 13 March 1978 | Christian Democracy | |
