= Fourth Andreotti government =

34th government of the Italian Republic

Andreotti IV Cabinet
- 34th Cabinet of Italy

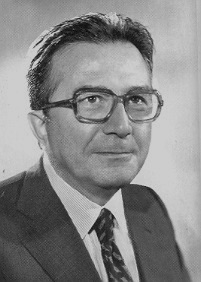
- Date established: 13 March 1978
- Date dissolved: 21 March 1979

Leadership and composition
- Head of state: Giovanni Leone; Sandro Pertini
- Head of government: Giulio Andreotti
- Member parties: DC; External support: PCI, PSI, PSDI, PRI,
- Status in legislature: One-party government

Formation and history
- Legislature term: VII Legislature (1976–1979)
- Predecessor: Andreotti III Cabinet
- Successor: Andreotti V Cabinet

The Andreotti IV Cabinet, led by Giulio Andreotti, was the 34th cabinet of the Italian Republic.

The government obtained confidence on 16 March 1978 in the Chamber of Deputies with 545 votes in favor, 30 against and 3 abstentions, and in the Senate with 267 votes in favor and 5 against. It was the first and solely cabinet in the history of the Italian Republic based on a confidence and supply agreement with the Italian Communist Party.

Despite the dissolution of the reserve by Andreotti and his oath in the hands of President Leone, the birth of the government was uncertain until the night before of his presentation in Parliament. The wide and above all rapid trust given to the government was also the result of the climate of emergency in which Montecitorio was found at the news that, an hour before the opening of the session, the Red Brigades had kidnapped the President of the Christian Democracy Aldo Moro and killed the men of his escort. Moro was also assassinated on 9 May 1978.

== Composition ==
Portfolio	Minister	Took office	Left office	Party
Prime Minister	Giulio Andreotti	13 March 1978	21 March 1979	DC
Minister of Foreign Affairs	Arnaldo Forlani	13 March 1978	21 March 1979	DC
Minister of the Interior	Francesco Cossiga	13 March 1978	11 May 1978	DC
Minister of the Interior	Giulio Andreotti (ad interim)	11 May 1978	13 June 1978	DC
Minister of the Interior	Virginio Rognoni	13 June 1978	21 March 1979	DC
Minister of Grace and Justice	Francesco Paolo Bonifacio	13 March 1978	21 March 1979	DC
Minister of Budget and Economic Planning	Tommaso Morlino	13 March 1978	21 March 1979	DC
Minister of Finance	Franco Maria Malfatti	13 March 1978	21 March 1979	DC
Minister of Treasury	Filippo Maria Pandolfi	13 March 1978	21 March 1979	DC
Minister of Defence	Attilio Ruffini	13 March 1978	21 March 1979	DC
Minister of Public Education	Mario Pedini	13 March 1978	21 March 1979	DC
Minister of Public Works	Gaetano Stammati	13 March 1978	21 March 1979	DC
Minister of Agriculture and Forests	Giovanni Marcora	13 March 1978	21 March 1979	DC
Minister of Transport	Vittorino Colombo	13 March 1978	21 March 1979	DC
Minister of Post and Telecommunications	Antonino Pietro Gullotti	13 March 1978	21 March 1979	DC
Minister of Industry, Commerce and Craftsmanship	Carlo Donat-Cattin	13 March 1978	25 November 1978	DC
Minister of Industry, Commerce and Craftsmanship	Romano Prodi	25 November 1978	21 March 1979	Independent
Minister of Health	Tina Anselmi	13 March 1978	21 March 1979	DC
Minister of Foreign Trade	Rinaldo Ossola	13 March 1978	21 March 1979	Independent
Minister of Merchant Navy	Vittorino Colombo (ad interim)	13 March 1978	21 March 1979	DC
Minister of State Holdings	Antonio Bisaglia	13 March 1978	21 March 1979	DC
Minister of Labour and Social Security	Vincenzo Scotti	13 March 1978	21 March 1979	DC
Minister of Cultural and Environmental Heritage	Dario Antoniozzi	13 March 1978	21 March 1979	DC
Minister of Tourism and Entertainment	Carlo Pastorino	13 March 1978	21 March 1979	DC
Minister for Extraordinary Interventions in the South (without portfolio)	Ciriaco De Mita	13 March 1978	21 March 1979	DC
Secretary of the Council of Ministers	Franco Evangelisti	13 March 1978	21 March 1979	DC
