= Fifth Moro government =

32nd government of the Italian Republic

Moro V Cabinet
- 32nd Cabinet of Italy

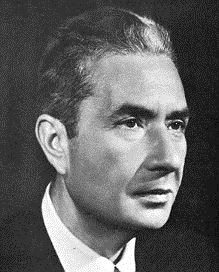
- Date formed: 12 February 1976
- Date dissolved: 30 July 1976

People and organisations
- Head of state: Giovanni Leone
- Head of government: Aldo Moro
- Member parties: DC
- Status in legislature: One-party government

History
- Outgoing election: 1976 election
- Legislature term: VI Legislature (1972–1976)
- Predecessor: Moro IV Cabinet
- Successor: Andreotti III Cabinet

The Moro V Cabinet, led by Aldo Moro, was the 32nd cabinet of the Italian Republic.

The government obtained confidence on 21 February 1976 in the Chamber of Deputies, with 287 votes in favor, 220 against and 60 abstentions, and on 25 February in the Senate, with 141 votes in favor and 113 against.

== Composition ==
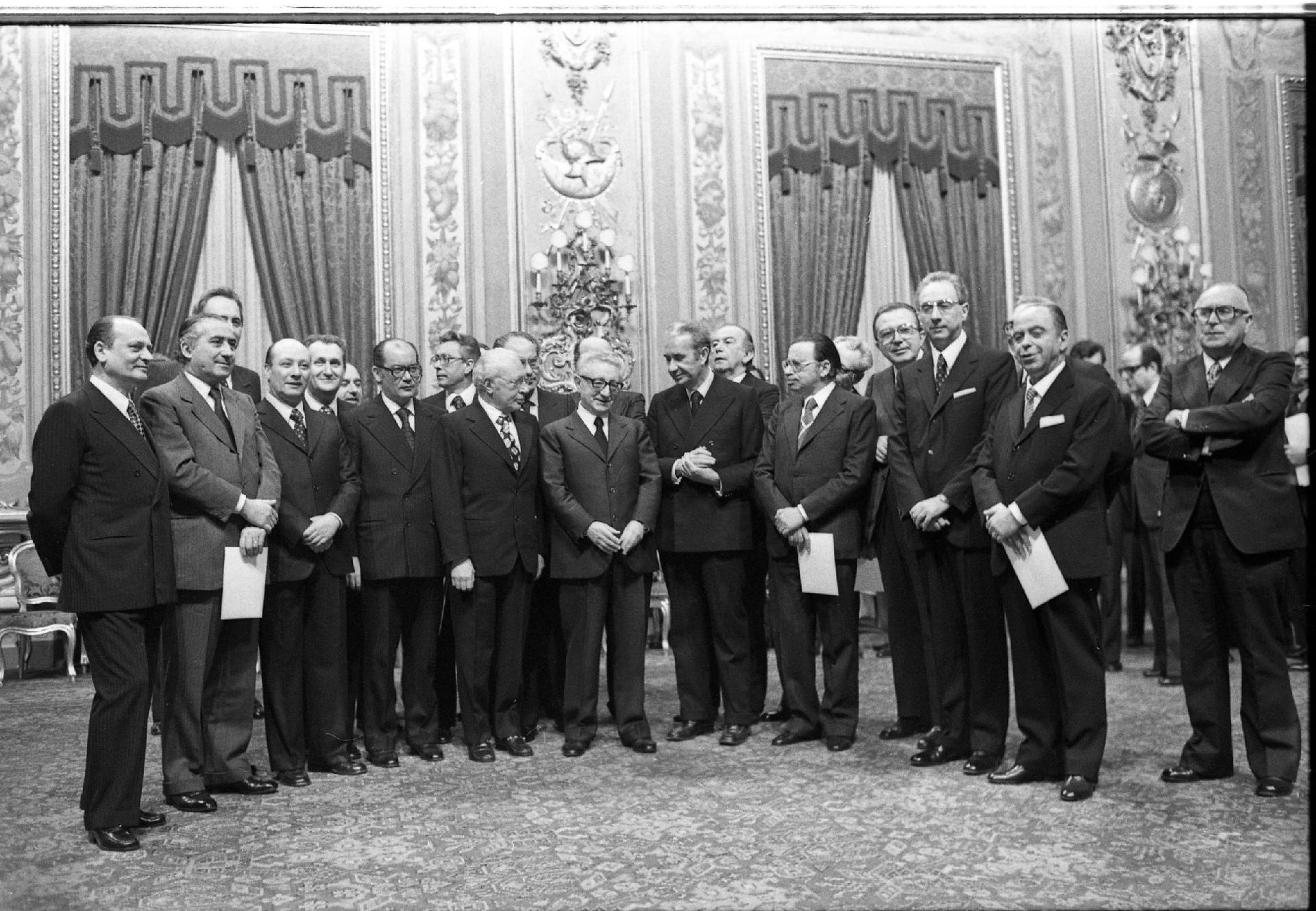
Official photo of the Moro's government after the oath at the Quirinal Palace

Portfolio	Minister	Took office	Left office	Party
Prime Minister	Aldo Moro	12 February 1976	30 July 1976	DC
Minister of Foreign Affairs	Mariano Rumor (ad interim)	12 February 1976	30 July 1976	DC
Minister of the Interior	Aldo Moro (ad interim)	12 February 1976	12 February 1976	DC
Minister of the Interior	Francesco Cossiga	12 February 1976	30 July 1976	DC
Minister of Grace and Justice	Francesco Paolo Bonifacio	12 February 1976	30 July 1976	DC
Minister of Budget and Economic Planning	Giulio Andreotti	12 February 1976	30 July 1976	DC
Minister of Finance	Gaetano Stammati	12 February 1976	30 July 1976	DC
Minister of Treasury	Emilio Colombo	12 February 1976	30 July 1976	DC
Minister of Defence	Arnaldo Forlani	12 February 1976	30 July 1976	DC
Minister of Public Education	Franco Maria Malfatti	12 February 1976	30 July 1976	DC
Minister of Public Works	Antonino Pietro Gullotti	12 February 1976	30 July 1976	DC
Minister of Agriculture and Forests	Giovanni Marcora	12 February 1976	30 July 1976	DC
Minister of Transport	Mario Martinelli	12 February 1976	30 July 1976	DC
Minister of Post and Telecommunications	Giulio Orlando	12 February 1976	30 July 1976	DC
Minister of Industry, Commerce and Craftsmanship	Carlo Donat-Cattin	12 February 1976	30 July 1976	DC
Minister of Health	Luciano Dal Falco	12 February 1976	30 July 1976	DC
Minister of Foreign Trade	Ciriaco De Mita	12 February 1976	30 July 1976	DC
Minister of Merchant Navy	Giovanni Gioia	12 February 1976	30 July 1976	DC
Minister of State Holdings	Antonio Bisaglia	12 February 1976	30 July 1976	DC
Minister of Labour and Social Security	Mario Toros	12 February 1976	30 July 1976	DC
Minister of Cultural and Environmental Heritage	Mario Pedini	12 February 1976	30 July 1976	DC
Minister of Tourism and Entertainment	Adolfo Sarti	12 February 1976	30 July 1976	DC
Minister for the Organization of Public Administration and Regions (without portfolio)	Tommaso Morlino	12 February 1976	30 July 1976	DC
Secretary of the Council of Ministers	Angelo Salizzoni	12 February 1976	30 July 1976	DC
