= Minister for Regional Affairs =

Ministry in the Cabinet of Italy

Minister for Regional Affairs and Autonomies
- Ministro per gli Affari Regionali e le Autonomie

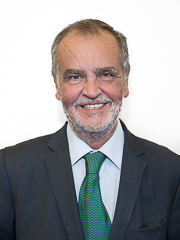
- Incumbent; Roberto Calderoli since 22 October 2022
- Department for Regional Affairs and Autonomies
- Member of: Council of Ministers
- Seat: Rome
- Appointer: The president of Italy
- Term length: No fixed term
- Formation: March 27, 1970; 56 years ago
- First holder: Eugenio Gatto
- Website: www.affariregionali.it

The minister for regional affairs and autonomies (Italian: ministro per affari regionali e le autonomie) is one of the positions in the Italian government.

The current minister for regional affairs and autonomies is Roberto Calderoli, a member of the League, who held the office since 22 October 2022 in the cabinet of Giorgia Meloni.

== List of ministers ==
Parties

- 1970–1994:
  - Christian Democracy
  - Italian Socialist Party
  - Italian Republican Party
  - Italian Liberal Party
  - Independent
- 1994–present:
  - Forza Italia / The People of Freedom
  - Democratic Party of the Left
  - Party of Italian Communists
  - Union of Democrats for Europe
  - Democratic Party
  - New Centre-Right / Popular Alternative
  - League
  - Independent

Coalitions

- 1970–1994:
  - Centrist coalition
  - Organic centre-left
  - Pentapartito / Quadripartito
  - Mixed coalition
- 1994–present:
  - Centre-right coalition
  - Centre-left coalition
  - Mixed coalition

Portrait	Name (Born–Died)	Term of office			Party	Government	Ref.
Portrait	Name (Born–Died)	Took office	Left office	Time in office	Party	Government	Ref.
Minister for the Implementation of Regions
	Eugenio Gatto (1911–1981)	27 March 1970	26 June 1972	2 years, 91 days	Christian Democracy	Rumor III; Colombo	
	Eugenio Gatto (1911–1981)	27 March 1970	26 June 1972	2 years, 91 days	Christian Democracy	Andreotti I	
Minister for Regional Affairs
	Fiorentino Sullo (1921–2000)	26 June 1972	7 July 1973	1 year, 11 days	Christian Democracy	Andreotti II	
	Mario Toros (1922–2018)	7 July 1973	23 November 1974	1 year, 139 days	Christian Democracy	Rumor IV·V	
	Tommaso Morlino (1925–1983)	23 November 1974	12 February 1976	1 year, 81 days	Christian Democracy	Moro IV	
Office not in use		1976–1980				Moro V Andreotti III·IV·V; Cossiga I	
Office not in use		1976–1980				Cossiga II	
	Roberto Mazzotta (1940– )	11 March 1978	28 June 1981	3 years, 109 days	Christian Democracy	Forlani	
	Aldo Aniasi (1921–2005)	28 June 1981	1 December 1982	1 year, 156 days	Italian Socialist Party	Spadolini I·II	
	Fabio Fabbri (1933–2024)	1 December 1982	4 August 1983	246 days	Italian Socialist Party	Fanfani V	
	Pier Luigi Romita (1924–2003)	4 August 1983	30 July 1984	361 days	Italian Socialist Party	Craxi I	
	Carlo Vizzini (1947– )	30 July 1984	18 April 1987	2 years, 262 days	Italian Socialist Party	Craxi I·II	
	Livio Paladin (1933–2000)	18 April 1987	29 July 1987	102 days	Independent	Fanfani VI	
	Aristide Gunnella (1931–2025)	28 July 1987	13 April 1988	260 days	Italian Republican Party	Goria	
	Antonio Maccanico (1924–2013)	13 April 1988	12 April 1991	2 years, 364 days	Italian Republican Party	De Mita; Andreotti VI	
Minister of Institutional Reforms and Regional Affairs
	Mino Martinazzoli (1931–2011)	12 April 1991	28 June 1992	1 year, 77 days	Christian Democracy	Andreotti VII	
Minister for the Coordination of Community Policies and Regional Affairs
	Raffaele Costa (1936–2026)	28 June 1992	21 February 1993	238 days	Italian Liberal Party	Amato I	
	Gianfranco Ciaurro (1929–2000)	21 February 1993	28 April 1993	66 days	Italian Liberal Party	Amato I	
	Valdo Spini (1946– )	28 April 1993	5 May 1993	7 days	Italian Socialist Party	Ciampi	
	Livio Paladin (1933–2000)	5 May 1993	10 May 1994	1 year, 5 days	Independent	Ciampi	
Minister of Public Function and Regional Affairs
	Giuliano Urbani (1937– )	10 May 1994	17 January 1995	252 days	Forza Italia	Berlusconi I	
	Franco Frattini (1957–2022)	17 January 1995	22 March 1996	1 year, 65 days	Independent	Dini	
	Giovanni Motzo (1930–2002)	23 March 1996	17 May 1996	55 days	Independent	Dini	
	Franco Bassanini (1940– )	17 May 1996	21 October 1998	2 years, 157 days	Democratic Party of the Left	Prodi I	
Minister for Regional Affairs
	Katia Bellillo (1951– )	21 October 1998	25 April 2000	1 year, 187 days	Party of Italian Communists	D'Alema I·II	
	Agazio Loiero (1940– )	25 April 2000	11 June 2001	1 year, 47 days	Union of Democrats for Europe	Amato II	
	Enrico La Loggia (1947– )	11 June 2001	17 May 2006	4 years, 340 days	Forza Italia	Berlusconi II·III	
Minister for Regional Affairs and Autonomies
	Linda Lanzillotta (1948– )	17 May 2006	8 May 2008	1 year, 357 days	The Daisy / Democratic Party	Prodi II	
Minister of Regional Affairs and Territorial Cohesion
	Raffaele Fitto (1969– )	8 May 2008	16 November 2011	3 years, 192 days	The People of Freedom	Berlusconi IV	
Minister of Tourism, Sport and Regional Affairs
	Piero Gnudi (1938– )	16 November 2011	28 April 2013	1 year, 163 days	Independent	Monti	
Minister for Regional Affairs and Autonomies
	Graziano Delrio (1960– )	28 April 2013	22 February 2014	300 days	Democratic Party	Letta	
	Maria Carmela Lanzetta (1955– )	22 February 2014	30 January 2015	342 days	Democratic Party	Renzi	
	Matteo Renzi (1975– ) As Prime Minister	30 January 2015	29 January 2016	364 days	Democratic Party	Renzi	
	Enrico Costa (1969– )	29 January 2016	19 July 2017	1 year, 171 days	New Centre-Right / Popular Alternative	Renzi; Gentiloni	
	Paolo Gentiloni (1954– ) As Prime Minister	19 July 2017	1 June 2018	317 days	Democratic Party	Gentiloni	
	Erika Stefani (1971– )	1 June 2018	5 September 2019	1 year, 96 days	League	Conte I	
	Francesco Boccia (1968– )	5 September 2019	13 February 2021	1 year, 161 days	Democratic Party	Conte II	
	Mariastella Gelmini (1973– )	13 February 2021	22 October 2022	1 year, 251 days	Forza Italia / Action	Draghi	
	Roberto Calderoli (1956– )	22 October 2022	Incumbent	3 years, 324 days	League	Meloni	
