= Fourth Moro government =

31st government of the Italian Republic

Moro IV Cabinet
- 31st Cabinet of Italy

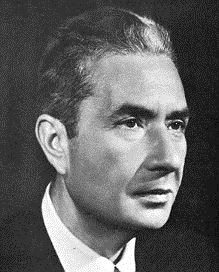
- Date formed: 23 November 1974
- Date dissolved: 12 February 1976

People and organisations
- Head of state: Giovanni Leone
- Head of government: Aldo Moro
- Member parties: DC, PRI; External support: PSI, PSDI
- Status in legislature: Coalition government
- Opposition parties: PCI, MSI, PLI

History
- Legislature term: VI Legislature (1972–1976)
- Predecessor: Rumor V Cabinet
- Successor: Moro V Cabinet

The Moro IV Cabinet, led by Aldo Moro, was the 31st cabinet of the Italian Republic. It held office from 1974 to 1976.

The government obtained confidence on 5 December 1974 in the Senate, with 190 votes in favor and 113 against, and on 7 December in the Chamber of Deputies, with 355 votes in favor, 226 against and 19 abstentions.

== Party breakdown ==
- Christian Democracy (DC): prime minister, 19 ministers, 39 undersecretaries
- Italian Republican Party (PRI): deputy prime minister, 4 ministers, 4 undersecretaries

== Composition ==
Portfolio	Minister	Took office	Left office	Party
Prime Minister	Aldo Moro	23 November 1974	12 February 1976	DC
Deputy Prime Minister	Ugo La Malfa	23 November 1974	12 February 1976	PRI
Minister of Foreign Affairs	Mariano Rumor	23 November 1974	12 February 1976	DC
Minister of the Interior	Luigi Gui	23 November 1974	12 February 1976	DC
Minister of Grace and Justice	Oronzo Reale	23 November 1974	12 February 1976	PRI
Minister of Budget and Economic Planning	Giulio Andreotti	23 November 1974	12 February 1976	DC
Minister of Finance	Bruno Visentini	23 November 1974	12 February 1976	DC
Minister of Treasury	Emilio Colombo	23 November 1974	12 February 1976	DC
Minister of Defence	Arnaldo Forlani	23 November 1974	12 February 1976	DC
Minister of Public Education	Franco Maria Malfatti	23 November 1974	12 February 1976	DC
Minister of Public Works	Pietro Bucalossi	23 November 1974	12 February 1976	PRI
Minister of Agriculture and Forests	Giovanni Marcora	23 November 1974	12 February 1976	DC
Minister of Transport	Mario Martinelli	23 November 1974	12 February 1976	DC
Minister of Post and Telecommunications	Giulio Orlando	23 November 1974	12 February 1976	DC
Minister of Industry, Commerce and Craftsmanship	Carlo Donat-Cattin	23 November 1974	12 February 1976	DC
Minister of Health	Antonino Pietro Gullotti	23 November 1974	12 February 1976	DC
Minister of Foreign Trade	Ciriaco De Mita	23 November 1974	12 February 1976	DC
Minister of Merchant Navy	Giovanni Gioia	23 November 1974	12 February 1976	DC
Minister of State Holdings	Antonio Bisaglia	23 November 1974	12 February 1976	DC
Minister of Labour and Social Security	Mario Toros	23 November 1974	12 February 1976	DC
Minister of Cultural and Environmental Heritage (Note: Until 14 December 1974 it was a ministry without portfolio.)	Giovanni Spadolini	23 November 1974	12 February 1976	PRI
Minister of Tourism and Entertainment	Adolfo Sarti	23 November 1974	12 February 1976	DC
Minister for the Coordination of Scientific and Technological Research Initiatives (without portfolio)	Mario Pedini	23 November 1974	12 February 1976	DC
Minister for the Organization of Public Administration (without portfolio)	Francesco Cossiga	23 November 1974	12 February 1976	DC
Minister for the Problems Related to the Regions (without portfolio)	Tommaso Morlino	23 November 1974	12 February 1976	DC
Secretary of the Council of Ministers	Angelo Salizzoni	23 November 1974	12 February 1976	DC
