= Francesco Compagna =

Italian politician, journalist and academic

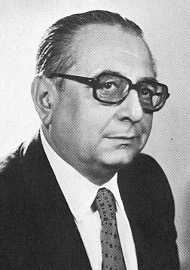
Francesco Compagna

Francesco Compagna (Naples, 31 July 1921 – Capri, 24 July 1982) was an Italian politician, journalist and academic.

He founded the magazine "Nord e Sud" in 1954 and also collaborated with Il Mondo directed by Mario Pannunzio.

Former member of the Italian Liberal Party and the Radical Party, Compagna was elected MP with the Italian Republican Party in the fifth (1968–1972), sixth (1972–1976), seventh (1976–1979) and eighth (1979–1983) legislature.

He served as Minister of Public Works in the Andreotti V (1979) and in the Cossiga II (1980) governments and as Minister of Merchant Navy in the Forlani government (1980–1981).

He also held the position of Undersecretary of State for Extraordinary Interventions in Southern Italy in the Moro IV government (1974–1976) and of Secretary of the Council of Ministers in the Spadolini I government (1981–1982).

He died on Capri in 1982 due to a heart attack.

== Publications ==
A principally political writer, he published the following volumes:

- Labirinto meridionale, Edizioni Neri Pozza
- I terroni in città, Edizioni Laterza
- L'Europa delle regioni, ESI-Edizioni Scientifiche Italiane
- La politica delle città, Laterza
- Le regioni più deboli, Etas-Kompass
- Meridionalismo liberale, Riccardo Ricciardi editore
- Il Mezzogiorno nella crisi, Edizioni della Voce.
- Mezzogiorno in salita, Editoriale Nuova

Preceded by Gaetano Stammati	Minister of Public Works of Italy; March–August 1979	Succeeded by Franco Nicolazzi
Preceded by Franco Nicolazzi	Minister of Public Works of Italy; April–October 1980	Succeeded by Franco Nicolazzi
