= List of legislatures of the Italian Republic =

This is a list of legislatures of the Italian Republic.

Name	Start date	End date	Duration (days)
Constituent Assembly	25 June 1946	31 January 1948	586
1st Legislature	8 May 1948	24 June 1953	1874
2nd Legislature	25 June 1953	11 June 1958	1813
3rd Legislature	12 June 1958	15 May 1963	1799
4th Legislature	16 May 1963	4 June 1968	1847
5th Legislature	5 June 1968	24 May 1972	1450
6th Legislature	25 May 1972	4 July 1976	1502
7th Legislature	5 July 1976	19 June 1979	1080
8th Legislature	20 June 1979	11 July 1983	1483
9th Legislature	12 July 1983	1 July 1987	1451
10th Legislature	2 July 1987	22 April 1992	1757
11th Legislature	23 April 1992	14 April 1994	722
12th Legislature	15 April 1994	8 May 1996	755
13th Legislature	9 May 1996	29 May 2001	1847
14th Legislature	30 May 2001	27 April 2006	1794
15th Legislature	28 April 2006	28 April 2008	732
16th Legislature	29 April 2008	14 March 2013	1781
17th Legislature	15 March 2013	22 March 2018	1833
18th Legislature	23 March 2018	12 October 2022	1665
19th Legislature	13 October 2022	Ongoing	897
