= Luigi Mariotti =

Italian politician (1912–2004)

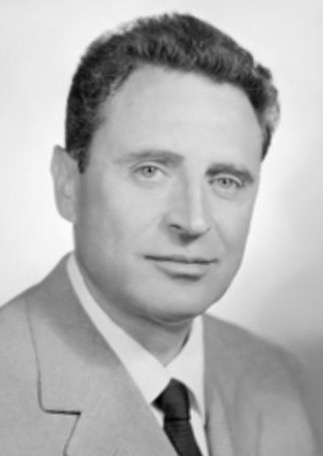
Luigi Mariotti

Luigi Mariotti (23 November 1912 in Florence – 27 December 2004 in Florence) was an Italian politician.

== Biography ==
Mariotti was a member of the Italian Socialist Party, with a reformist socialist tendency. He was Senator from 1953 to 1968 (Legislature II, III and IV), then he sat in the Chamber of Deputies from 1968 to 1979 (Legislature V, VI and VII).

He served as Minister of Health four times, clashing with the Italian Liberal Party and part of the Christian Democracy, opposed or doubting a universalistic approach to welfare, dear to the Socialist Party of those years and to Mariotti himself. He was the forerunner of the establishment of the National Health Service, which then took place in 1978, as a result of the battles that he promoted from the end of the '60s, within the centre-left governments. In 1968, he promoted the so-called Mariotti law (law 12 February 1968, no. 132), containing provisions on hospitals and hospital assistance, with which the hospital sector was profoundly reformed through the transformation of hospitals into public bodies distinct from assistance agencies.

He also served as Minister of Transport and Civil Aviation in the first Rumor government. He was found to be on the list of Propaganda Due members in 1981.

Preceded by Giacomo Mancini	Minister of Health; 1964–1968	Succeeded by Ennio Zelioli-Lanzini
Preceded by Oscar Luigi Scalfaro	Minister of Transport and Civil Aviation; 1968–1969	Succeeded by Remo Gaspari
Preceded by Camillo Ripamonti	Minister of Health; 1970–1972	Succeeded by Athos Valsecchi
