= Athos Valsecchi =

Italian politician (1919–1985)

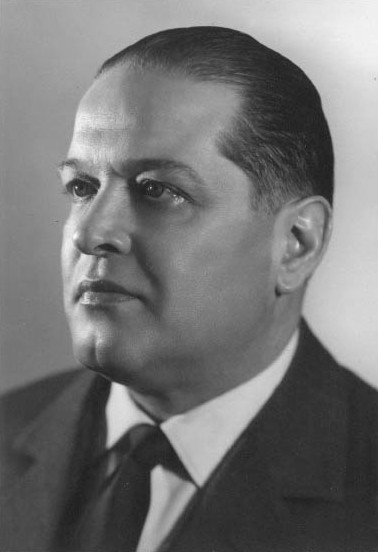

Minister of Finance
- In office 26 July 1972 – 7 July 1973
- Prime Minister: Giulio Andreotti
- Preceded by: Giuseppe Pella
- Succeeded by: Emilio Colombo

Minister of Health
- In office 17 February 1972 – 26 June 1972
- Prime Minister: Giulio Andreotti
- Preceded by: Luigi Mariotti
- Succeeded by: Remo Gaspari

Minister of Post and Telecommunications
- In office 6 August 1969 – 27 March 1970
- Prime Minister: Mariano Rumor
- Preceded by: Crescenzo Mazza
- Succeeded by: Franco Maria Malfatti

Minister of Agriculture and Forests
- In office 12 December 1968 – 8 August 1969
- Prime Minister: Mariano Rumor
- Preceded by: Giacomo Sedati
- Succeeded by: Giacomo Sedati

Member of the Senate
- In office 16 May 1963 – 25 May 1972
- Constituency: Sondrio

Member of the Chamber of Deputies
- In office 8 May 1948 – 15 May 1963
- Constituency: Como-Sondrio-Varese

Personal details
- Born: 26 November 1919 Gravedona, Lombardy, Italy
- Died: 20 July 1985 (aged 65) Rome, Lazio, Italy
- Party: Christian Democracy
- Spouse: Marisa Gallegioni
- Children: 3
- Education: Università Cattolica del Sacro Cuore
- Profession: Politician, teacher

Athos Valsecchi (26 November 1919 – 20 July 1985) was an Italian Christian Democrat politician. He served several times in Italian governments as undersecretary and minister. He was a member of the Chamber of Deputies of Italy in Legislature I, Legislature II and Legislature III, while he was a member of the Senate in Legislature IV, Legislature V and Legislature VI.

== Biography ==
Born from a humble family (his father was a pastry chef, orphaned from his mother since birth), he spent his childhood and adolescence in Chiavenna, the city from which the family originated. He graduated in literature from the Catholic University of Milan in 1942.

He was Lieutenant of Complement of the Alpini. After 8 September 1943 he took refuge in the Swiss Confederation as an internee. There he began to approach the political thought of democratic Catholics, meeting and meeting people in Switzerland, including Amintore Fanfani.

Returning to Chiavenna after the end of the conflict, he was professor and Dean of the Middle Schools of the Municipality of Chiavenna and continued his political activity in the context of the provincial Christian Democrats, tying himself particularly to Ezio Vanoni.

He was elected to the Chamber of Deputies at the age of 28 in the legislature of 1948 and then reconfirmed in the subsequent legislatures of 1953 and 1958. He was subsequently elected Senator for three terms and held numerous parliamentary and government posts, which nevertheless never induced him to leave out the intense political and economic activity in favor of his Province.

Appointed president of the BIM Consortium (Bacino Imbrifero Montano) of the Adda, a position he held until 1985, the year of his death, thanks to a careful and insightful administration of the contributions of the over-rents that the producers of electricity paid to BIM, he worked in various initiatives aimed at improving the life and economy of its territory. He also enhanced the zootechnical selection through the development of the herd book and the rehabilitation of the alpine brown cattle breed characteristic of the mountain area. In recognition of these merits the Provincial Breeders Association of Sondrio awarded him, on 16 October 1966, the Gold Medal of Merit.

He was also Mayor of the municipality of Chiavenna from 1951 to 1956 and from 1964 to 1970.

== The oil scandal ==
In 1974 Athos Valsecchi together with other politicians (Giulio Andreotti, Giacinto Bosco, Mario Ferrari Aggradi, Mauro Ferri, Luigi Preti) was involved in the so-called "First oil scandal", accused of having benefited or favored funding from ENEL and political parties of government by the oil companies, In the case, being ministers, the investigating commission for the prosecution proceedings took care of the investigations only carried out by Valsecchi and Ferri. After a long and careful examination, the commission had to acknowledge that the acts adopted by the Minister of Finance Valsecchi as well as those of the Minister of Industry Ferri were legitimate "excluding any hypothesis of corruption" and therefore not to have to proceed against them. Valsecchi was fully acquitted, but only after 5 years.
