= Vittorino Colombo =

Italian politician (1925–1996)

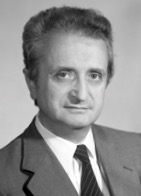

President of the Italian Senate
- In office 12 May 1983 – 11 July 1983
- Preceded by: Tommaso Morlino
- Succeeded by: Francesco Cossiga

Personal details
- Born: 3 April 1925 Albiate, Kingdom of Italy
- Died: 1 June 1996 (aged 71) Milan, Lombardy, Italy
- Party: Christian Democracy
- Education: Catholic University of Milan
- Profession: Trade Unionist

Vittorino Colombo (3 April 1925 – 1 June 1996) was an Italian politician.

== Biography ==
Colombo was born in Albiate, province of Monza and Brianza, Lombardy. He would go on to get a degree in economics and business. He worked as a trade unionist prior to entering politics among the ranks of the Christian Democracy.

He served in the cabinet of Prime Ministers Mariano Rumor (1974), Giulio Andreotti (1976–1979) and Cossiga (1979–1980). He served as Minister of Health in the Government of Italy from March to November 1974.

He was Deputy in Legislature III (1958–1963), Legislature IV (1963–1968), Legislature V (1968–1972) and Legislature VI (1972–1976).

Later he was elected Senator in Legislature VII (1976–1979), Legislature VIII (1979–1983), Legislature IX (1983–1987), Legislature X (1987–1992) and Legislature XI (1992–1994).

He served as President of the Senate from 12 May to 11 July 1983.

He died in Milan on 1 June 1996.

== Legacy ==
Following his death in 1997, the International Vittorino Colombo Prize was established to honour individuals who contribute to the study and dissemination of authentic values that contribute to solidarity and collaboration among peoples.

He was an important figure in Chinese-Italian relations, he founded the Italian Chinese Institute and the Italy China Foundation, the latter of which he presided over.

Political offices
Preceded by Carlo Russo	Minister of Foreign Trade; 1968–1969	Succeeded by Riccardo Misasi
Preceded by Giuseppe Lupis	Minister of Merchant Navy; 1969–1970	Succeeded by Salvatore Mannironi
Preceded by Luigi Gui	Minister of Health; 1974	Succeeded by Antonino Pietro Gullotti
Preceded by Giulio Orlando	Minister of Post and Telecommunications; 1976–1978	Succeeded by Antonino Pietro Gullotti
Preceded by Vito Lattanzio	Minister of Transport; 1978–1979	Succeeded by Luigi Preti
Preceded by Antonino Pietro Gullotti	Minister of Post and Telecommunications; 1979–1980	Succeeded by Clelio Darida
Preceded by Tommaso Morlino	President of the Italian Senate; 1983	Succeeded by Francesco Cossiga
