= Vittorio Lattanzio =

Italian politician (1926–2010)

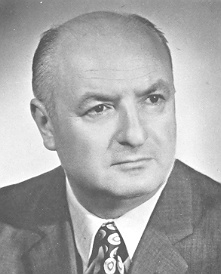

Personal details
- Born: 31 October 1926 Bari, Apulia, Italy
- Died: 31 October 2010 (aged 84) Bari, Apulia, Italy
- Party: Christian Democrat
- Profession: Physician

Vittorio (Vito) Lattanzio (31 October 1926 – 31 October 2010) was an Italian Christian Democrat politician and physician.

== Biography ==
Lattanzio was born on 31 October 1926 in Bari, Italy. He would get a degree in medicine and begin working as a physician before entering politics, where he would become a prominent member of the Christian Democrats; making a name for himself in the field of foreign policy.

=== Political career ===
He would first take the national stage by becoming the undersecretary of defence in the Andreotti II Cabinet.

Lattanzio served as minister of defence (1976–1977) in the Andreotti III Cabinet. He would face harsh criticism for his role as minister of defence after convicted Nazi Herbert Kappler escaped from Italian custody in 1977 to find sanctuary in West Germany. He would ultimately resign from this position due to the scandal, but go on to take different cabinet level positions.

Following the kidnapping and death of fellow Apulia native Aldo Moro, Lattanzio effectively inherited the 'Apulian electoral fortune.'

He would go on to serve the cabinets of Prime Ministers Andreotti (1976–1978, 1989–1992) and De Mita (1988–89) as minister of transport, then minister of civil protection, and lastly as minister of foreign trade. While serving as Minister of Civil protection he would be criticized for inefficient handling of the department during the 1990 Augusta Earthquake. Lattanzio would actively participate in increasing trade with China while Minister of Foreign Trade. He also served in the Chamber of Deputies of Italy in Legislature III, Legislature IV, Legislature V, Legislature VI, Legislature VII, Legislature VIII, Legislature IX and Legislature X.

Lattanzio would be placed under house arrest while being investigated on allegations of corruption and illicit party financing.

He died in his hometown of Bari on his 84th birthday, and was survived by his daughter.

== Works ==
- Wrote Italian Security Policy and the North Atlantic Alliance for the Nato Review.

Political offices
Preceded by Arnaldo Forlani	Minister of Defence of Italy; 1976–1977	Succeeded by Attilio Ruffini
