= Giovanni Spadolini =

Italian politician (1925–1994)

Senator for Life Giovanni Spadolini
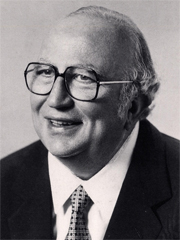

President of the Senate of the Republic
- In office 2 July 1987 – 14 April 1994
- Preceded by: Giovanni Malagodi
- Succeeded by: Carlo Scognamiglio

Prime Minister of Italy
- In office 28 June 1981 – 1 December 1982
- President: Sandro Pertini
- Preceded by: Arnaldo Forlani
- Succeeded by: Amintore Fanfani

Acting President of Italy
- In office 28 April 1992 – 28 May 1992
- Prime Minister: Giulio Andreotti
- Preceded by: Francesco Cossiga
- Succeeded by: Oscar Luigi Scalfaro
Ministerial offices
Minister of Defence
In office 4 August 1983 – 18 April 1987
Prime Minister	Bettino Craxi
Preceded by	Lelio Lagorio
Succeeded by	Remo Gaspari
Minister of Public Education
In office 21 March 1979 – 5 August 1979
Prime Minister	Giulio Andreotti
Preceded by	Mario Pedini
Succeeded by	Salvatore Valitutti
Minister for Cultural Heritage and the Environment
In office 21 December 1974 – 12 February 1976
Prime Minister	Aldo Moro
Preceded by	Office established
Succeeded by	Mario Pedini
Parliamentary offices
Member of the Senate of the Republic
Life tenure 2 May 1991 – 4 August 1994
Nominated by	Francesco Cossiga
In office 25 May 1972 – 1 May 1991
Constituency	Milan

Personal details
- Born: 21 June 1925 Florence, Kingdom of Italy
- Died: 4 August 1994 (aged 69) Rome, Italy
- Party: Italian Republican Party
- Height: 1.80 m (5 ft 11 in)
- Education: University of Florence
- Profession: Teacher, journalist, historian

Giovanni Spadolini (Italian: [dʒoˈvanni spadoˈliːni]; 21 June 1925 – 4 August 1994) was an Italian politician and statesman, who served as the 44th prime minister of Italy. He had been a leading figure in the Republican Party and the first head of a government to not be a member of Christian Democrats since 1945. He was also a newspaper editor, journalist and historian. He is considered a highly respected intellectual for his literary works and his cultural dimension.

Professor of Contemporary History at the University of Florence, he was the author of numerous historical works. He was also a journalist and editor-in-chief of the Bolognese newspaper Il Resto del Carlino, then of the Milanese newspaper Il Corriere della Sera.

Spadolini was the first Italian Minister of Cultural Heritage and Environment from 1974 to 1976. He became Prime Minister in 1981 and he led two successive cabinets which were supported by a coalition of parties in Parliament but this only lasted a few months. He was Minister of Defence in the governments headed by Socialist leader Bettino Craxi from 1983 to 1987 before being elected President of the Senate. In 1991, Spadolini was appointed Lifetime Senator by President Francesco Cossiga.

== Early life ==
Spadolini was born into a bourgeois family: his father Guido Spadolini was a Macchiaioli painter, owner of a large library in which the young Giovanni studied and began to form his culture inspired by secular, liberal-democratic and republican values. He was the younger brother of architect Pierluigi Spadolini. He was an assiduous student, brilliant in all subjects, at Liceo Classico Statale Galileo. He published his first article in 1944 in Italia e Civiltà ("Italy and Civilisation"), a fascist periodical critical of the excesses of fascism in which the idealist philosopher Giovanni Gentile also collaborated.

During the post-war period (from 1945 to 1950) Spadolini became a moderate liberal conservative. He also rejected antisemitism in favour of Zionism. He studied law at the University of Florence and shortly after graduation was appointed Professor of Contemporary History in the Faculty of Political Science. He also became a political columnist for several newspapers, such as Il Borghese, Il Messaggero and Il Mondo, becoming editor-in-chief of the Bologna paper Il Resto del Carlino in 1955, doubling its circulation during his tenure. In 1968, Spadolini moved to Milan where he took over the editorship of Italy's largest newspaper, Corriere della Sera, a position he held until 1972. In that year, he was elected as a senator, going on to serve as minister of the environment and then minister of education. Then in 1979, he was appointed secretary of the small but powerful Italian Republican Party (PRI).

As a journalist, he sometimes used the pseudonym Giovanni dalle Bande Nere (Giovanni of the Black Bands).

== Prime Minister of Italy, 1981–1982 ==
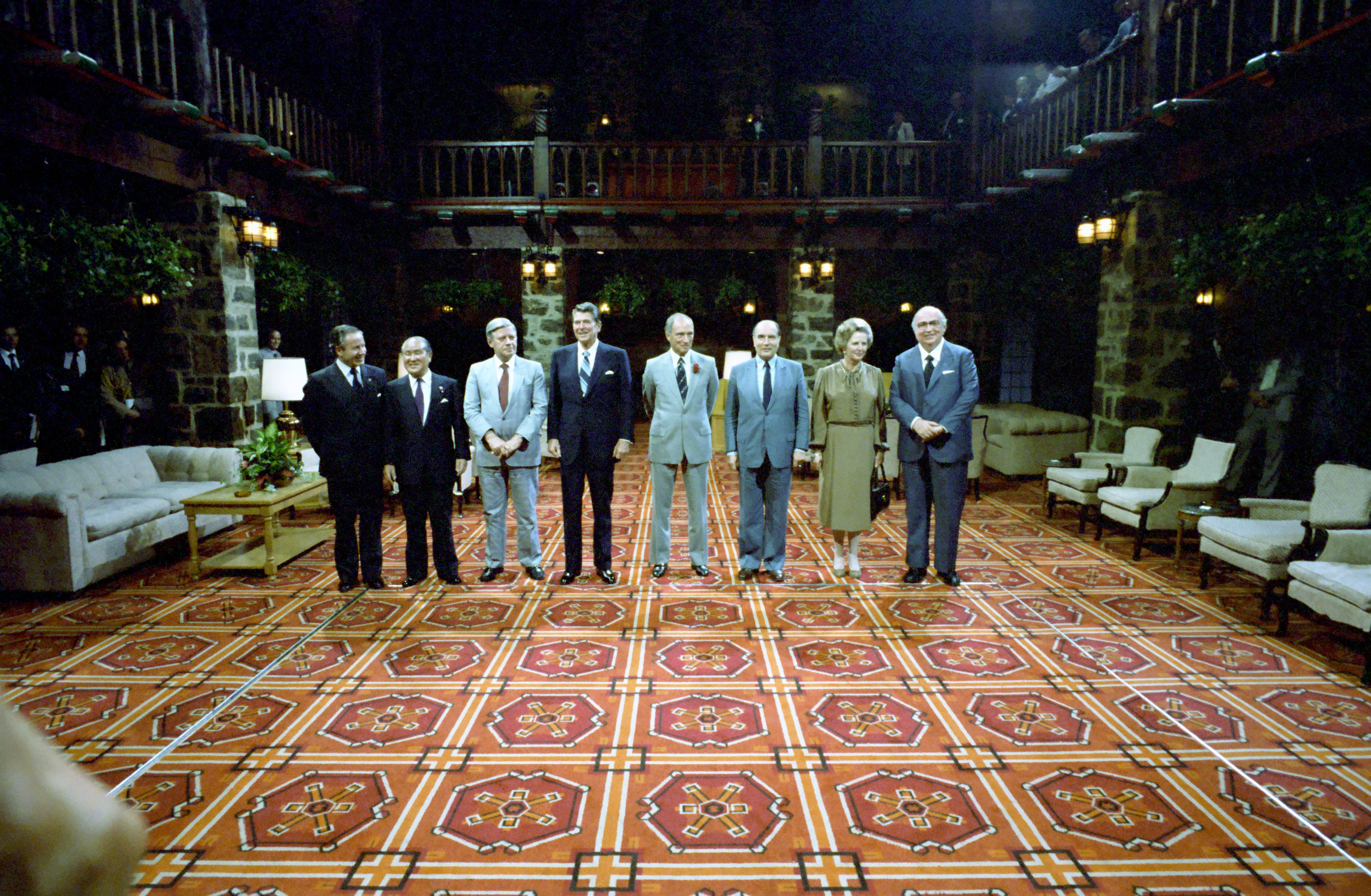
Spadolini (far right) with other national leaders during the G7 summit in 1981

He served as Prime Minister of Italy from 1981 to 1982, the first PM since 1945 not to be a member of the Christian Democrats. He pledged to fight corruption (in particular a scandal involving certain Italian political figures connected with a Masonic lodge known as P2) and mounting terrorist violence.

In foreign policy, he was a non-interventionist but also moderately Americanist. In particular, he shifted away from Italy's previous pro-Arab policy, refusing to meet Yasser Arafat during his official visit to Italy to protest the murder of Stefano Gaj Taché, an Italian Jewish child, by PLO terrorists, and suggesting that the Bologna train station bombing may have been perpetrated by the PLO and Gaddafi's Libya, in spite of a majority accusing neo-fascists.

In 1982, after a political crisis between the Minister of the Treasury Beniamino Andreatta (DC) and the Minister of Finance Rino Formica (PSI), Spadolini resigned and formed a new cabinet identical to the former, which collapsed in November when Bettino Craxi's Socialist Party withdrew its support.

== Later life ==
Under his leadership, the PRI obtained 5% of all votes for the first time in the 1983 Italian general election. From 1987 to April 1994, he was president of the Italian Senate. He became Acting President of Italy on 28 April 1992, upon the resignation of then President Francesco Cossiga, for a month. Following the electoral success of Silvio Berlusconi's Forza Italia, he lost the chairmanship of the Senate to Carlo Scognamiglio Pasini by a single vote.

== Personal life and death ==
Spadolini never married. In July 1994 he had a stomach operation. He died of respiratory failure in Rome in August 1994.

== Electoral history ==
Election	House	Constituency	Party	Votes	Result
1972	Senate of the Republic	Milan I	PRI	7,231	Elected
1976	Senate of the Republic	Milan I	PRI	6,862	Elected
1979	Senate of the Republic	Milan IV	PRI	10,134	Elected
1983	Senate of the Republic	Milan I	PRI	13,405	Elected
1987	Senate of the Republic	Milan I	PRI	7,745	Elected

Media offices
Preceded by Vittorio Zincone	Director of the Resto del Carlino; 1955–1968	Succeeded by Domenico Bartoli
Preceded by Mario Ferrara	Director of the Nuova Antologia; 1955–1994	Succeeded by Cosimo Ceccuti
Preceded by Alfio Russo	Director of the Corriere della Sera; 1968–1972	Succeeded by Piero Ottone
Academic offices
Preceded by Furio Cicogna	President of the Bocconi University; 1976–1994	Succeeded by Mario Monti
Political offices
New office	Minister for Cultural Heritage and Environment; 1974–1976	Succeeded by Mario Pedini
Preceded by Mario Pedini	Minister of Public Education; 1979	Succeeded by Salvatore Valitutti
Preceded by Arnaldo Forlani	Prime Minister of Italy; 1981–1982	Succeeded by Amintore Fanfani
Preceded by Lelio Lagorio	Minister of Defence; 1983–1987	Succeeded by Remo Gaspari
Preceded by Giovanni Malagodi	President of the Italian Senate; 1987–1994	Succeeded by Carlo Scognamiglio
Preceded by Francesco Cossiga	President of Italy; Acting; 1992	Succeeded by Oscar Luigi Scalfaro
Party political offices
Preceded by Oddo Biasini	Secretary of the Italian Republican Party; 1979–1987	Succeeded by Giorgio La Malfa
