= Legislature VIII of Italy =

8th legislature of the Italian Republic (1979–1983)

Legislature VIII of Italy VIII legislatura della Repubblica Italiana
- 8th legislature

Type
- Type: bicameral
- Houses: Chamber of Deputies; Senate of the Republic

History
- Founded: 20 June 1979
- Disbanded: 11 July 1983 (4 years, 21 days)
- Preceded by: VII Legislature
- Succeeded by: IX Legislature

Leadership
- President of the Senate: List: Amintore Fanfani, DC (20 June 1979 – 1 December 1982) Tommaso Morlino, DC (9 December 1982 – 6 May 1983) Vittorino Colombo, DC (9 May 1983 – 11 July 1983)
- President of the Chamber of Deputies: Nilde Iotti, PCI

Structure
- Seats: 630 (C); 315+ (S)
- Chamber of Deputies political groups: DC (262); PCI (201); PSI (62); MSI (30); PSDI (20); PR (18); PRI (16); PLI (9); PdUP (6); Others (6)
- Senate political groups: DC (138); PCI (109); PSI (32); MSI (13); PSDI (9); PRI (6); PLI (2); PR (2); Others (4)

Elections
- Chamber of Deputies voting system: Proportional
- Senate voting system: Proportional
- Last general election: 3 June 1979

Meeting place
- Palazzo Montecitorio, Rome (C)
- Palazzo Madama, Rome (S)

Website
- Eighth Legislature – Chamber of Deputies; Eighth Legislature – Senate

Constitution
- Constitution of Italy

The Legislature VIII of Italy (Italian: VIII Legislatura della Repubblica Italiana) was the 8th legislature of the Italian Republic, and lasted from 20 June 1979 until 11 July 1983. Its composition was the one resulting from the general election of 3 June 1979.

== Main chronology ==
The legislature saw the birth of a new political coalition that would have characterized the Italian politics during the 1980s. The so-called Pentapartito began in 1981 at a meeting of the Congress of the Italian Socialist Party (PSI), when the Christian democrat Arnaldo Forlani and socialist Bettino Craxi signed an agreement with the "blessing" of Giulio Andreotti. As the agreement was signed in a trailer, it was called the "pact of the camper." The pact was soon defined "CAF" for the initials of the signers: Craxi–Andreotti–Forlani. With this agreement, the DC recognized the equal dignity of the so-called "secular parties" of the majority (i.e., the Socialists, Social Democrats, Liberals and Republicans) and also guaranteed an alternation of government with them. In June 1981 republican Giovanni Spadolini became the first non-Christian democrat to sworn in as Prime Minister of Italy.

With the birth of the Pentapartito, the possibility of the growth of the majority toward the Italian Communist Party (PCI) was finally dismissed.

During this legislature, the list of who belonged to the secret lodge P2 was published. The P2 was a Masonic lodge founded in 1945 that, by the time its Masonic charter was withdrawn in 1976, had transformed into a clandestine, pseudo-Masonic, ultraright organization operating in contravention of Article 18 of the Constitution of Italy that banned secret associations. In its latter period, during which the lodge was headed by Licio Gelli, P2 was implicated in numerous Italian crimes and mysteries, including the collapse of the Vatican-affiliated Banco Ambrosiano, the murders of journalist Mino Pecorelli and banker Roberto Calvi, and corruption cases within the nationwide bribe scandal Tangentopoli. P2 came to light through the investigations into the collapse of Michele Sindona's financial empire.

P2 was sometimes referred to as a "state within a state" or a "shadow government". The lodge had among its members prominent journalists, Members of Parliament, industrialists, and military leaders—including Silvio Berlusconi, who later became Prime Minister of Italy; the Savoy pretender to the Italian throne Victor Emmanuel; and the heads of all three Italian intelligence services (at the time SISDE, SISMI and CESIS).

When searching Licio Gelli's villa in 1982, the police found a document called the "Plan for Democratic Rebirth", which called for a consolidation of the media, suppression of trade unions, and the rewriting of the Italian Constitution.

The scandal subsequent the discovery of the members of the lodge brought to a deep crisis between the main political parties which were part of the government and ended with the official dissolution of the lodge with the Law 25 January 1982, n. 17.

== Government ==
Prime Minister	Party	Term of office		Government	Composition
Prime Minister	Party	Took office	Left office	Government	Composition
Francesco Cossiga (1928–2010)	Christian Democracy	4 August 1979	4 April 1980	Cossiga I	DC • PSDI • PLI (with PSI and PRI's external support)
Francesco Cossiga (1928–2010)	Christian Democracy	4 April 1980	18 October 1980	Cossiga II	DC • PSI • PRI
Arnaldo Forlani (1925–2023)	Christian Democracy	18 October 1980	28 June 1981	Forlani	DC • PSI • PSDI • PRI (Organic Centre-left)
Giovanni Spadolini (1925–1994)	Italian Republican Party	28 June 1981	23 August 1982	Spadolini I	DC • PSI • PSDI • PLI • PRI (Pentapartito)
Giovanni Spadolini (1925–1994)	Italian Republican Party	23 August 1982	1 December 1982	Spadolini II	DC • PSI • PSDI • PLI • PRI (Pentapartito)
Amintore Fanfani (1908–1999)	Christian Democracy	1 December 1982	4 August 1983	Fanfani V	DC • PSI • PSDI • PLI (with PRI's external support)

== Parliamentary composition ==
=== Chamber of Deputies ===
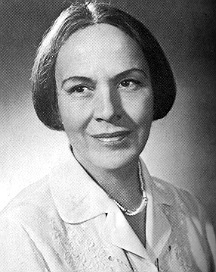
Nilde Iotti, President of the Chamber of Deputies

- President: Nilde Iotti (PCI), elected on 20 June 1979
- Vice Presidents: Loris Fortuna (PSI, till 1 December 1982), Oscar Luigi Scalfaro (DC), Maria Eletta Martini (DC), Aldo Aniasi (PSI, from 14 December 1982), Pier Luigi Romita (PSDI, till 18 October 1980), Luigi Preti (PSDI, from 14 December 1980)

Parliamentary groups in the Chamber of Deputies
Initial composition (20 June 1979)		Final composition (11 July 1983)		
Parliamentary group	Seats	Parliamentary group	Seats	Change
Christian Democracy	262	Christian Democracy	263	▲1
Italian Communist Party	201	Italian Communist Party	193	▼8
Italian Socialist Party	62	Italian Socialist Party	61	▼1
Italian Social Movement	30	Italian Social Movement	29	▼1
Italian Democratic Socialist Party	20	Italian Democratic Socialist Party	19	▼1
Radical Party	18	Radical Party	11	▼7
Italian Republican Party	16	Italian Republican Party	15	▼1
Italian Liberal Party	9	Italian Liberal Party	9	Steady
Proletarian Unity Party	6	Proletarian Unity Party	6	Steady
Mixed	6	Mixed	24	▲18
Südtiroler Volkspartei	4	Südtiroler Volkspartei	4	Steady
List for Trieste	1	List for Trieste	1	Steady
Union valdôtaine	1	Union valdôtaine	1	Steady
		Independent Left	11	▲11
		Independent–Non inscrits	7	▲7
Total seats	630	Total seats	630	Steady

=== Senate of the Republic ===
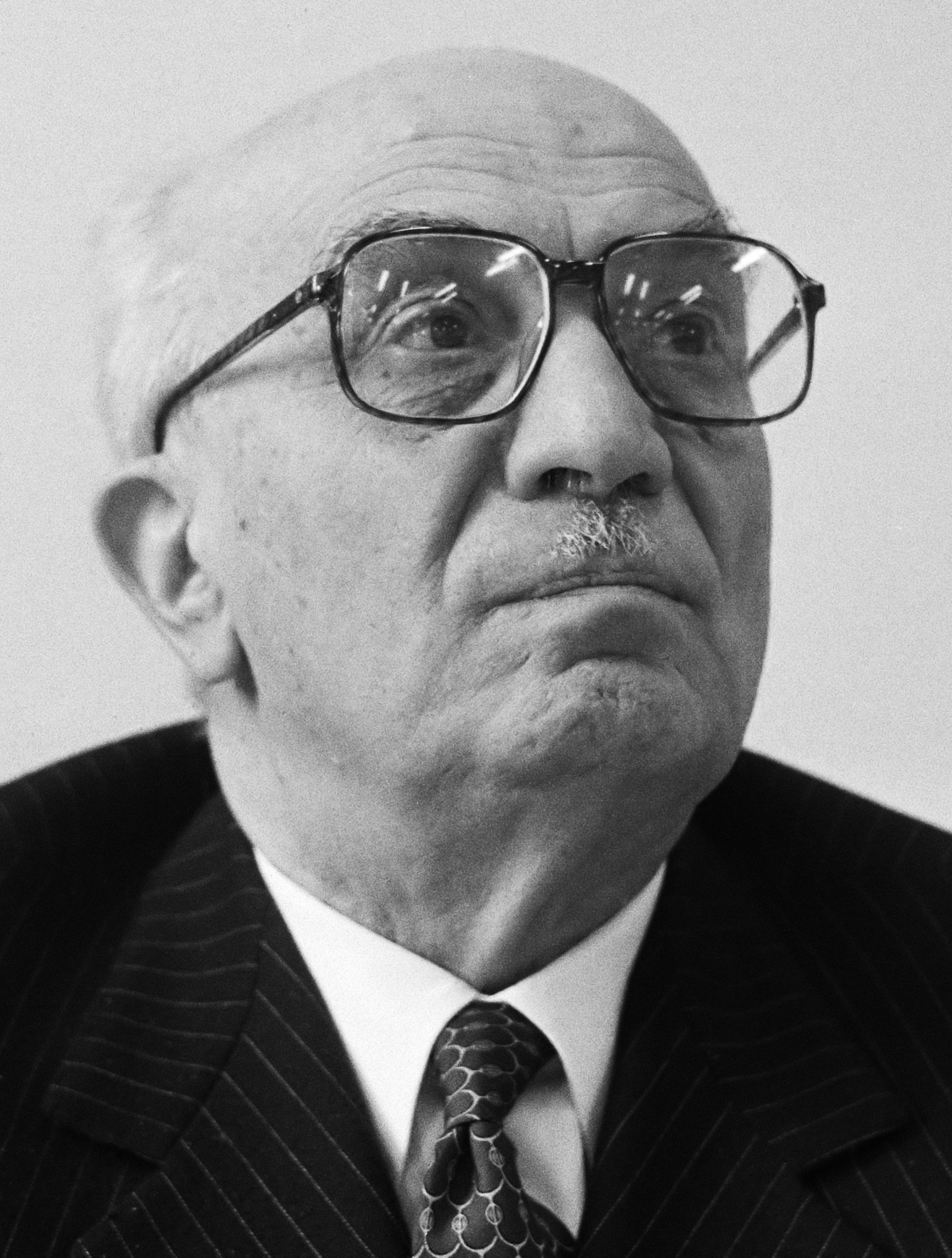
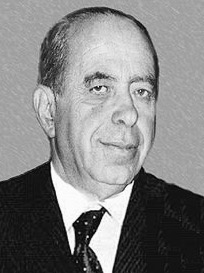
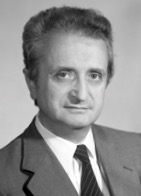
Presidents of the Senate: Amintore Fanfani (1979–1982), Tommaso Morlino (1982–1983), Vittorino Colombo (1983)
- Presidents:
  - Amintore Fanfani (DC), elected on 20 June 1979 and resigned on 1 December 1982;
  - Tommaso Morlino (DC), elected on 9 December 1982 and deceased in office on 6 May 1983;
  - Vittorino Colombo (DC), elected on 9 May 1983.
- Vice Presidents: Luigi Carraro (DC, till 8 November 1980), Adriano Ossicini (SI), Dario Valori (PCI), Giuseppe Ferralasco (PSI, till 6 December 1982), Tommaso Morlino (DC, from 21 January 1981 until 9 December 1982), Alberto Cipellini (PSI, from 16 December 1982), Vittorino Colombo (DC, from 20 January 1983 until 9 May 1983)

Parliamentary groups in the Senate of the Republic
Initial composition (20 June 1979)		Final composition (11 July 1983)		
Parliamentary group	Seats	Parliamentary group	Seats	Change
Christian Democracy	138	Christian Democracy	138	Steady
Italian Communist Party	109	Italian Communist Party	94	▼15
Italian Socialist Party	32	Italian Socialist Party	32	Steady
Italian Social Movement	13	Italian Social Movement	13	Steady
Italian Democratic Socialist Party	9	Italian Democratic Socialist Party	9	Steady
Italian Republican Party	6	Italian Republican Party	6	Steady
Mixed	8	Mixed	23	▲15
Italian Liberal Party	2	Italian Liberal Party	2	Steady
Radical Party	2	Radical Party	2	Steady
Südtiroler Volkspartei	3	Südtiroler Volkspartei	3	Steady
Union valdôtaine	1	Union valdôtaine	1	Steady
		Independent Left	15	▲15
Total seats	315	Total seats	315	Steady

==== Senators for Life ====
Senator	Motivation	Appointed by	From	Till
Cesare Merzagora	Merits in the social field	President Antonio Segni	Previous legislature	Next legislature
Ferruccio Parri	Merits in the social field	President Antonio Segni	Previous legislature	8 December 1981 (deceased)
Eugenio Montale	Merits in the literary field	President Giuseppe Saragat	Previous legislature	12 September 1981 (deceased)
Pietro Nenni	Merits in the social field	President Giuseppe Saragat	Previous legislature	1 January 1980 (deceased)
Giuseppe Saragat	Former President of Italy	ex officio	Previous legislature	Next legislature
Amintore Fanfani	Merits in the social field	President Giovanni Leone	Previous legislature	Next legislature
Giovanni Leone	Former President of Italy	ex officio	Previous legislature	Next legislature
Leo Valiani	Merits in the social field	President Sandro Pertini	12 January 1980	Next legislature
Eduardo De Filippo	Merits in the literary and artistic field	President Sandro Pertini	26 September 1981	Next legislature
Camilla Ravera	Merits in the social field	President Sandro Pertini	8 January 1982	Next legislature
