= Carlo Pastorino =

Italian politician (1925–2011)

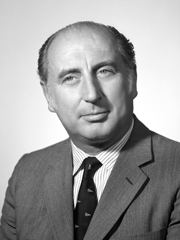

Minister of Tourism and Entertainment
- In office 11 March 1978 – 20 March 1979
- Preceded by: Dario Antoniozzi
- Succeeded by: Egidio Ariosto

Member of the Senate of the Republic
- In office 25 May 1972 – 1 July 1987

Member of the Regional Council of Liguria
- In office 1970–1975

President of the Province of Genoa
- In office 1967–1970
- Preceded by: Francesco Cattanei
- Succeeded by: Gabriele Di Pasqua

Personal details
- Born: 9 February 1925 Genoa, Kingdom of Italy
- Died: 2 August 2011 (aged 86) Genoa, Italy
- Party: Christian Democracy
- Education: University of Genoa
- Profession: Stockbroker

Carlo Pastorino (9 February 1925 – 2 August 2011) was an Italian politician of Christian Democracy. He served as president of the Province of Genoa from 1967 to 1970 and as a member of the Senate of the Republic from the sixth to the ninth legislatures. From 11 March 1978 to 20 March 1979, Pastorino served as Minister of Tourism and Entertainment in the Andreotti IV Cabinet.
