= Luciano Dal Falco =

Italian politician (1925–1992)

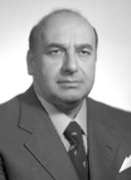
Luciano Dal Falco

Luciano Dal Falco (May 10, 1925 – December 20, 1992) was an Italian politician.

== Biography ==
Son of a railway official, he grew up in Verona. He enrolled at the University of Padua but was arrested during a round-up and sent to the forced restructuring works on the railway lines destroyed by the bombing. After the landing of Anzio he managed to escape from the prison camp and joins the Resistance in the Manara Brigade (of Catholic inspiration).

At the end of the war he joined the Christian Democracy, came into contact with Giuseppe Dossetti, who invited him to move to Rome, and received his political inheritance after leaving the active policy decided by the theologian. Thus he joined the national party council, and in 1951 he participated in the formation of the faction Democratic Initiative.

Dal Falco has been member of the Chamber of Deputies from 1958 to 1963 and Senator from 1968 to 1973. He also served as Minister of Health from 1976 to 1978, in the governments chaired by Aldo Moro and Giulio Andreotti.

He died on 20 December 1992.

Preceded by Antonio Pietro Gullotti	Minister of Health of Italy; 1976–1978	Succeeded by Tina Anselmi
