= Gaetano Stammati =

Italian politician, lecturer, public executive and banker

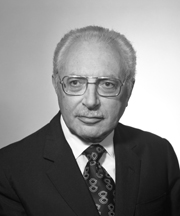
Gaetano Stammati

Gaetano Stammati (4 October 1908 – 11 February 2002) was an Italian politician, lecturer, public executive and banker.

During his career, Stammati has been general manager at the Ministry of the Treasury, board member of IRI, General Accountant of the State, President of the Italian Commercial Bank, Professor of economic policy at the Statistics Faculty of the Sapienza University of Rome and several times Minister in the 70s.

== Biography ==
Stammati was born in Naples in 1908 and graduated in law in 1930.

After a life spent in public administration, in 1976 he was appointed Minister of Finance in Aldo Moro's government and was elected Senator as independent among the ranks of the Minister in the Italian general elections. He served as Minister of Treasury from 1976 to 1978, Minister of Public Works (1978–1979) and Minister of International Trade (1979) in Giulio Andreotti's third, fourth and fifth governments. He was reelected in 1979 Italian general election as senator, but in 1981 was involved in Propaganda Due scandal and retired from politics.

Stammati died in Rome on 11 February 2002 when he was 93 years old.

Political offices
Preceded by Bruno Visentini	Italian Minister of Finance; 12 February 1976 – 29 July 1976	Succeeded by Filippo Maria Pandolfi
Preceded by Emilio Colombo	Italian Minister of Treasury; 29 July 1976 – 11 March 1978	Succeeded by Filippo Maria Pandolfi
Preceded by Rinaldo Ossola	Italian Minister of Public Works; 11 March 1978 – 20 March 1979	Succeeded by Francesco Compagna
Preceded by Antonino Pietro Gullotti	Italian Minister of International Trade; 20 March 1979 – 4 August 1979	Succeeded by Antonio Bisaglia
