= Rinaldo Ossola =

Italian economist and politician

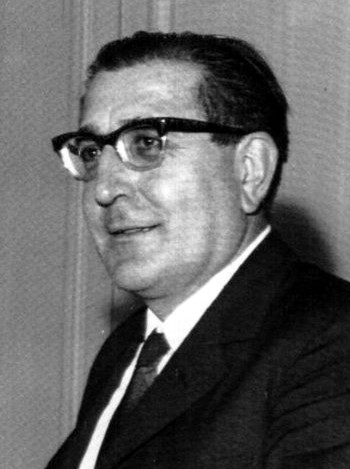

Director General of the Bank of Italy
- In office 19 August 1975 – 30 July 1976
- Preceded by: Paolo Baffi
- Succeeded by: Mario Ercolani

Minister of Foreign Trade
- In office 29 July 1976 – 20 March 1979
- Prime Minister: Giulio Andreotti
- Preceded by: Ciriaco De Mita
- Succeeded by: Gaetano Stammati

Personal details
- Born: 8 November 1913 Lecco, Italy
- Died: 7 December 1990 (aged 77) Rome, Italy
- Education: Bocconi University

Rinaldo Ossola (8 November 1913 – 7 December 1990) was an Italian economist and politician. He served as Director General of the Bank of Italy from 1975 to 1976 and as Minister of Foreign Trade from 1976 to 1979.

== Biography ==
Rinaldo Ossola, after graduating in 1935 from Bocconi University in Milan and specializing in the London School of Economics and the Institute of Bankers, was hired by the Bank of Italy in December 1938.

In the post-war years Ossola participated in the works that led to the creation of the currency compensation system in Europe and the establishment of the European payments union. He participated in the meetings of the main international cooperation bodies and contributed to the design of the European Common Market.

Subsequently, he became head of the studies service for the international economy of the Bank of Italy (1964), Economic adviser of the same institute (1967) and Deputy Director General (1969).

He was elected President of the Group of Ten "Committee of Substitutes" and coordinated negotiations on changes to the International Monetary Fund's statute for the creation of a new international currency. The "Ossola Report" was the IMF document which sanctioned the creation of the Special Drawing Rights, a conventional currency available to member countries, used above all by Countries in difficulty with the passive balance of payments status.

From 19 August 1975 to 30 July 1976 he was Director General of the Bank of Italy, while from 29 July 1976 to 20 March 1979 he served as Minister of Foreign Trade in two cabinets led by Prime Minister Giulio Andreotti.

Subsequently, he became vice-president of the Italian Banking Association (ABI), president of Banco di Napoli (from April 1980 to December 1982) and president of Credito Varesino (in 1983).

He died in Rome on 7 December 1990.
