= Roberto Mazzotta =

Italian economist and politician (born 1940)

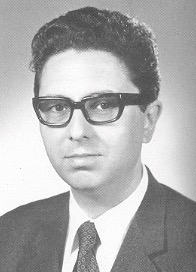

Minister of Regional Affairs
- In office 1980–1981
- Prime Minister: Arnaldo Forlani

Personal details
- Born: 1940 (age 85–86) Milan, Italy
- Party: Christian Democracy
- Education: Bocconi University

Roberto Mazzotta (born 1940) is an Italian politician from the Christian Democracy (DC) and served in different posts at the DC. He was the minister of regional affairs in the period 1980–1981.

== Biography ==
Mazzotta born in Milan in 1940. His father is from Lecce and his mother from Turin. He received a bachelor's degree in economics and commerce from Bocconi University.

Mazzotta became a member of the DC from an early age. He was the DC's regional secretary of Lombardy and deputy national secretary. He served at the Chamber of Deputies for DC in the period 1972–1986. Mazzotta served as the undersecretary of state in 1974. He was appointed minister of regional affairs to the cabinet led by Prime Minister Arnaldo Forlani. In early 1980s Mazzotta together with other reformist DC politicians protested over the factional politics in the DC and Italy's general political passivity. He was a candidate for the general secretary of the DC during this period, but he did not won the election.

From 1986 Mazzotta worked at various banks, including Cariplo, Banca Popolare di Milano and Mediocredito Italiano. He was the first president of the board of directors of the Foundation Centesimus Annus Pro Pontifice which he held between 1993 and 1997. He is the president of the Luigi Sturzo Institute.
