= Remo Gaspari =

Italian politician (1921–2011)

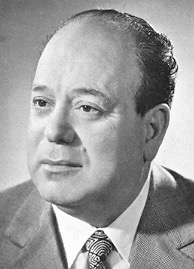
Remo Gaspari

Remo Gaspari (10 July 1921 – 19 July 2011) was an Italian politician who was several times minister of the Italian Republic.

== Biography ==
Gaspari was born in Gissi, in Abruzzo, a region which would be his main electoral basin during his political career. He graduated in law at the University of Bologna.

Gaspari was a member of the Italian parliament without interruptions from 1968 to 1992. He was a member of the so-called Dorotei wing of Italian Christian Democracy (Italian: Democrazia Cristiana, simply DC) along with Vincenzo Scotti, Arnaldo Forlani and Antonio Gava. In 1960, he was undersecretary to Mail and Telecommunications in the Tambroni Cabinet. After a series of positions as undersecretary in various ministers, he became minister for the first time in the second Rumor government (1968), and subsequently, again under Rumor and the follower prime ministers Colombo and Andreotti, he was Minister of Reformation of Public Administration.

In the Andreotti II Cabinet, he was Minister of Health. Gaspari was also the national vice-secretary of DC from 1976 to 1980. In 1980, he became Minister of Relationships with the Parliament in the second Cossiga government, Minister of Public Functions in the two Bettino Craxi-led cabinets, and, from 1987, Minister of Defence in the short-lived Amintore Fanfani government. After a period as Minister for Mezzogiorno, he ended his government career as Minister of Public Functions in the sixth and seventh cabinets led by Giulio Andreotti in the early 1990s.

A song by Elio e le Storie Tese mentions an episode in which Gaspari used a state helicopter to arrive in time to watch an AS Roma football match.

Gaspari died in Gissi from infarction in July 2011.

== Sources ==
- Damilano, Marco (2006). Democristiani immaginari. Vallecchi. ISBN 88-8427-113-4.
- Iezzi, U.; W. Zarroli (1991). W Zio Remo. Tracce.
