= Tommaso Morlino =

Italian politician (1925–1983)

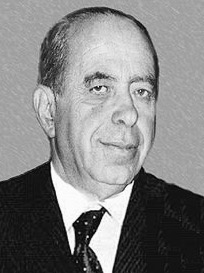

President of the Italian Senate
- In office 9 December 1982 – 6 May 1983
- Preceded by: Amintore Fanfani
- Succeeded by: Vittorino Colombo

Minister of Grace and Justice
- In office 21 March 1979 – 18 October 1980
- Prime Minister: Giulio Andreotti; Francesco Cossiga
- Preceded by: Francesco Paolo Bonifacio
- Succeeded by: Adolfo Sarti

Minister of Budget
- In office 30 July 1976 – 21 March 1979
- Prime Minister: Giulio Andreotti
- Preceded by: Giulio Andreotti
- Succeeded by: Ugo La Malfa

Minister of Regional Affairs
- In office 23 November 1974 – 12 February 1976
- Prime Minister: Giulio Andreotti
- Preceded by: Mario Toros
- Succeeded by: Roberto Mazzotta

Personal details
- Born: 26 August 1925 Irsina, Kingdom of Italy
- Died: 6 May 1983 (aged 57) Giustiniani Palace, Rome, Lazio, Italy
- Party: Christian Democracy

Tommaso Morlino (26 August 1925 – 6 May 1983) was an Italian politician.

== Early life and career ==
Born in Irsina to the notary Giovan Battista Morlino of Avigliano and Silvia Scardaccione. He was orphaned when he was just a teenager and went to live in Sant'Arcangelo, where he grew up in his mother's house.

His mother, Silvia Scardaccione, was the daughter of Giuseppe Scardaccione di Sant'Arcangelo. Her brother Decio Scardaccione was an economist, agronomist and university professor, as well as one of the leading Lucanian exponents of Christian Democracy; Morlino had a close relationship with him throughout his political career. He graduated in law and political science and in 1948 he entered the roles of the State Advocacy, where he covered his entire career, until he became, in 1951, Deputy Advocate General.

== Political career ==
He was Senator of the Republic from 1968 until his death, in 1983. He also served as Undersecretary for the Budget from 1973 to 1974, Minister for Regional affairs from 1974 to 1976, Minister of Budget and Economic Planning from 1976 to 1979, Minister of Justice from 1979 to 1980 and President of the Senate from 1982 to 1983.

In the Christian Democracy, Morlino was a loyal Moroteo, that is a member of the faction headed by Aldo Moro.

He died on 6 May 1983 from a heart attack.

Political offices
Preceded by Mario Toros	Minister of Regional Affairs; 1974–1976	Succeeded by Roberto Mazzotta
Preceded by Giulio Andreotti	Minister of Budget; 1976–1979	Succeeded by Ugo La Malfa
Preceded by Francesco Paolo Bonifacio	Minister of Grace and Justice; 1979–1980	Succeeded by Adolfo Sarti
Preceded by Amintore Fanfani	President of the Italian Senate; 1982–1983	Succeeded by Vittorino Colombo
