= Francesco Paolo Bonifacio =

Italian politician, jurist and academic (1923–1989)

Francesco Paolo Bonifacio OMRI
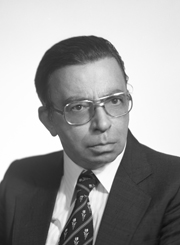

Minister of Grace and Justice
- In office 12 February 1976 – 20 March 1979
- Prime Minister: Aldo Moro; Giulio Andreotti
- Preceded by: Oronzo Reale
- Succeeded by: Tommaso Morlino

President of the Constitutional Court
- In office 23 February 1973 – 25 October 1975
- Preceded by: Giuseppe Chiarelli
- Succeeded by: Paolo Rossi

Member of the Senate
- In office 5 July 1976 – 1 July 1987

Personal details
- Born: 3 May 1923 Castellammare di Stabia, Campania, Italy
- Died: 14 March 1989 (aged 65) Rome, Lazio, Italy
- Party: Christian Democracy

Francesco Paolo Bonifacio (3 May 1923 – 14 March 1989) was an Italian politician, jurist and academic. He served as Minister of Justice and President of the Constitutional Court of Italy.

== Biography ==
Bonifacio was born in Castellammare di Stabia, near Naples.

He was one of the youngest full professors of Roman Law at the University of Cagliari, Bari and Naples, a position he held until February 1963, when he was elected by the Italian Parliament as a judge of the Italian Constitutional Court. He was then elected as the eighth President of such Court from February 1973 to October 1975.

In 1964 Bonifacio was awarded Italy's highest honor: the Republic's Grand Cross Knighthood (Cavaliere di Gran Croce della Repubblica).

In 1975, Bonifacio was elected to the Italian Senate, and served as Minister of Justice from February 1976 until March 1979. Bonifacio presided over two Senate commissions which considered and promoted constitutional amendments.

From 1987, he began to teach Constitutional Justice at the Sapienza University of Rome.

He died in 1989 in his home in Rome, due to a tumor.
