= Dario Antoniozzi =

Italian politician (1923–2019)

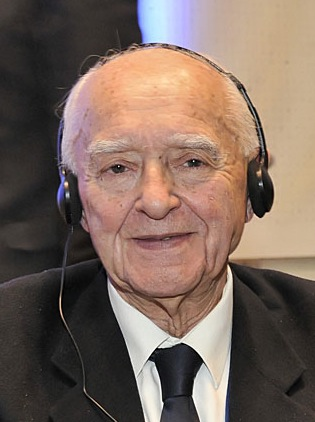
Dario Antoniozzi, 2011

Dario Antoniozzi (11 December 1923 – 25 December 2019) was an Italian politician.

He was the father of Alfredo Antoniozzi, an MEP from 2004 to 2014 among the ranks of Forza Italia.

== Biography ==
Antoniozzi was born in Rieti but he grew up in Cosenza, where his father Florindo had moved for work reasons (he was general manager of the Cassa di Risparmio di Calabria e di Lucania for years).

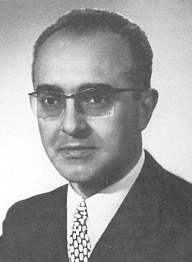
Antoniozzi in the 70s

He was elected for the first time to the Chamber of Deputies in 1953, and held office until 1980.

He was Vice-Secretary of the Christian Democracy and party leader in Calabria for a long time.

He served as Secretary of the Council of Ministers from 1970 to 1972, as Minister of Tourism and Entertainment from 1976 to 1978 and as Minister for Cultural and Environmental Heritage from 1978 to 1979.

A Member of the European Parliament since its establishment, in 1979 he achieved excellent personal success at the first direct election of the Strasbourg Assembly and was re-elected also in the subsequent European election. However, on the occasion of the 1989 European Parliament election, Antoniozzi, weakened by the internal struggles inside the Christian Democracy and by the explicit aversion of Riccardo Misasi, he was no longer re-elected and therefore withdrew from political life active, continuing to hold high-level conferences, all over the world, on Europe and the meaning of this choice.

He died on 25 December 2019.

== Honours and awards ==
- Italy: Gold medal for the merits of culture and art (Rome, 30 October 1980)

== See also ==
- Secretary of the Council of Ministers of Italy
