= Legislature VII of Italy =

7th legislature of the Italian Republic (1976–1979)

Legislature VII of Italy VII legislatura della Repubblica Italiana
- 7th legislature

Type
- Type: bicameral
- Houses: Chamber of Deputies; Senate of the Republic

History
- Founded: 5 July 1976
- Disbanded: 19 June 1979 (2 years, 349 days)
- Preceded by: VI Legislature
- Succeeded by: VIII Legislature

Leadership
- President of the Senate: Amintore Fanfani, DC
- President of the Chamber of Deputies: Pietro Ingrao, PCI

Structure
- Seats: 630 (C); 315+ (S)
- Chamber of Deputies political groups: DC (262); PCI (228); PSI (57); MSI (35); PSDI (15); PRI (14); DP (6); PLI (5); PR (4); Others (4)
- Senate political groups: DC (135); PCI (116); PSI (29); MSI (15); PSDI (6); PRI (6); PLI (2); Others (6)

Elections
- Chamber of Deputies voting system: Proportional
- Senate voting system: Proportional
- Last general election: 20 June 1976

Meeting place
- Palazzo Montecitorio, Rome (C)
- Palazzo Madama, Rome (S)

Website
- Seventh Legislature – Chamber of Deputies; Seventh Legislature – Senate

Constitution
- Constitution of Italy

The Legislature VII of Italy (Italian: VII Legislatura della Repubblica Italiana) was the 7th legislature of the Italian Republic, and lasted from 5 July 1976 until 19 June 1979. Its composition was the one resulting from the general election of 20 June 1976.

== Main chronology ==
After the election which officially certified the historic growth of the communists, Aldo Moro became a vocal supporter of the necessity of starting a dialogue between DC and PCI. Moro's main aim was to widen the democratic base of the government, including the PCI in the parliamentary majority: the cabinets should have been able to represent a larger number of voters and parties. According to him, the DC should have been as the centre of a coalition system based on the principles of consociative democracy. This process was known as Historic Compromise.

Between 1976 and 1977, Enrico Berlinguer's PCI broke with the Communist Party of the Soviet Union, implementing, with Spanish and French communist parties, a new political ideology known as Eurocommunism. Such a move made an eventual cooperation more acceptable for Christian democratic voters, and the two parties began an intense parliamentary debate, in a moment of deep social crises.

The proposal by Moro of starting a cabinet composed by DC and PSI and externally supported by PCI was strongly opposed by both superpowers. The United States feared that the cooperation between PCI and DC might have allowed the communists to gain information on strategic NATO military plans and installations. Moreover, the participation in government of the communists in a Western country would have represented a cultural failure for the USA. On the other hand, the Soviets considered the potential participation by the Italian Communist Party in a cabinet as a form of emancipation from Moscow and rapprochement to the Americans.

The Christian democrat Giulio Andreotti, known as a staunch anti-communist, was called in to lead the first experiment of a cabinet externally supported by the communists. Andreotti's new cabinet, formed in July 1976, included only members of his own DC party but had the indirect support of the communists. The cabinet was called "the government of the not-no confidence", because it was externally supported by all the political parties in the Parliament, except for the neo-fascist Italian Social Movement. In this new climate of cooperation, on 5 July 1976 Pietro Ingrao was the first communist to be elected as President of the Chamber of Deputies.

This cabinet fell in January 1978. In March, the crisis was overcome by the intervention of Aldo Moro, who proposed a new cabinet again formed only by DC politicians, but this time with positive confidence votes from the other parties, including the PCI. This cabinet was also chaired by Andreotti, and was formed on 11 March 1978.

On 16 March 1978, Aldo Moro was kidnapped by the Red Brigades, an ultra-left terrorist group, on the day in which the new government was going to be sworn in before parliament. Despite the huge shock that the kidnapping and the consecutive murder of Aldo Moro caused on the Italian politics, Andreotti continued as Prime Minister of the "National Solidarity" government with the support of the PCI. During this period the Parliament passed a long list of new laws and reforms, including the creation of the Italian National Health Service, the promulgation of the Basaglia Law for the closing down of all psychiatric hospitals and the parliamentary approval of a new law to legalize abortion.

In June 1978, the PCI gave its approval and ultimately active support to a campaign against President Giovanni Leone, accused of being involved in the Lockheed bribery scandal. This resulted in the President's resignation. The party then supported the election of the veteran socialist Sandro Pertini as President of Italy.

=== Presidential election ===
On 29 June 1978 the Parliament and the representatives of the 20 Italian regions met to elect the sixth President of Italy. On 8 July 1978 the socialist Sandro Pertini was elected on the sixteenth ballot with 832 votes out of 1011.

== Government ==
Prime Minister	Party	Term of office		Government	Composition
Prime Minister	Party	Took office	Left office	Government	Composition
Giulio Andreotti (1919–2013)	Christian Democracy	29 July 1976	11 March 1978	Andreotti III	DC (with PCI's external support) (Historic Compromise)
Giulio Andreotti (1919–2013)	Christian Democracy	11 March 1978	20 March 1979	Andreotti IV	DC (with PCI's external support) (Historic Compromise)
Giulio Andreotti (1919–2013)	Christian Democracy	20 March 1979	4 August 1979	Andreotti V	DC • PSI • PSDI

== Parliamentary composition ==
=== Chamber of Deputies ===
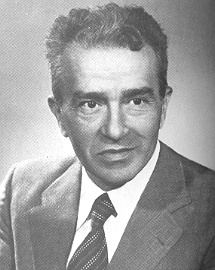
Pietro Ingrao, President of the Chamber of Deputies

- President: Pietro Ingrao (PCI), elected on 5 July 1976
- Vice Presidents: Virginio Rognoni (DC, till 13 June 1978), Oscar Luigi Scalfaro (DC), Maria Eletta Martini (DC, from 21 June 1978), Pietro Bucalossi (PRI), Luigi Mariotti (PSI)

Parliamentary groups in the Chamber of Deputies
Initial composition (5 July 1976)		Final composition (19 June 1979)		
Parliamentary group	Seats	Parliamentary group	Seats	Change
Christian Democracy	262	Christian Democracy	263	▲1
Italian Communist Party	228	Italian Communist Party	220	▼8
Italian Socialist Party	57	Italian Socialist Party	57	Steady
Italian Social Movement	35	Italian Social Movement	17	▼18
Italian Social Movement	35	National Democracy	15	▲15
Italian Democratic Socialist Party	15	Italian Democratic Socialist Party	15	Steady
Italian Republican Party	14	Italian Republican Party	14	Steady
Proletarian Democracy	6	Proletarian Democracy	5	▼1
Italian Liberal Party	5	Italian Liberal Party	5	Steady
Radical Party	4	Radical Party	5	▲1
Mixed	4	Mixed	14	▲10
Südtiroler Volkspartei	3	Südtiroler Volkspartei	3	Steady
		Independent–Non inscrits	9	▲9
Total seats	630	Total seats	630	Steady

=== Senate of the Republic ===
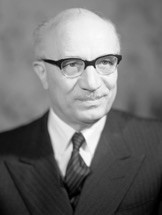
Amintore Fanfani, President of the Senate

- President: Amintore Fanfani (DC), elected on 5 July 1976
- Vice Presidents: Luigi Carraro (DC), Edoardo Catellani (PSI), Dario Valori (PCI), Tullia Carettoni Romagnoli (SI)

Parliamentary groups in the Senate of the Republic
Initial composition (5 July 1976)		Final composition (19 June 1979)		
Parliamentary group	Seats	Parliamentary group	Seats	Change
Christian Democracy	135	Christian Democracy	135	Steady
Italian Communist Party	116	Italian Communist Party	117	▲1
Italian Socialist Party	29	Italian Socialist Party	29	Steady
Italian Social Movement	15	Italian Social Movement	6	▼9
Italian Social Movement	15	National Democracy	9	▲9
Italian Democratic Socialist Party	6	Italian Democratic Socialist Party	8	▲2
Italian Republican Party	6	Italian Republican Party	6	Steady
Mixed	8	Mixed	8	Steady
Italian Liberal Party	2	Italian Liberal Party	2	Steady
Südtiroler Volkspartei	2	Südtiroler Volkspartei	2	Steady
Independent–Non inscrits	4	Independent–Non inscrits	1	▼3
Total seats	315	Total seats	315	Steady

==== Senators for Life ====
Senator	Motivation	Appointed by	From	Till
Giovanni Gronchi	Former President of Italy	ex officio	Previous legislature	17 October 1978 (deceased)
Cesare Merzagora	Merits in the social field	President Antonio Segni	Previous legislature	Next legislature
Ferruccio Parri	Merits in the social field	President Antonio Segni	Previous legislature	Next legislature
Eugenio Montale	Merits in the literary field	President Giuseppe Saragat	Previous legislature	Next legislature
Pietro Nenni	Merits in the social field	President Giuseppe Saragat	Previous legislature	Next legislature
Giuseppe Saragat	Former President of Italy	ex officio	Previous legislature	Next legislature
Amintore Fanfani	Merits in the social field	President Giovanni Leone	Previous legislature	Next legislature
Giovanni Leone	Former President of Italy	ex officio	15 June 1978	Next legislature
