= Mario Toros =

Italian politician (1922–2018)

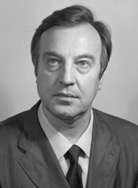

Senator of the Italian Republic
- In office May 25, 1972 – July 1, 1987
- Constituency: Friuli-Venezia Giulia

Member of Italian Chamber of Deputies
- In office June 12, 1958 – May 24, 1972
- Constituency: Udine

Personal details
- Born: December 9, 1922 Pagnacco, Italy
- Died: June 3, 2018 (aged 95) Udine, Italy
- Citizenship: Italy
- Party: Christian Democrat
- Profession: Trade Unionist

Mario Toros (9 December 1922 – 3 June 2018) was a Friulian politician for the Christian Democracy and trade unionist.

== Biography ==
Toros was born on December 9, 1922, in Pagnacco, Italy. He is of Friulian descent and has been an active advocate for them, going so far as being president of the Friuli nel Mondo.

He was a Deputy from 1958 to 1972 and as a Senator from 1972 to 1987.

He served as Minister for Regional Affairs from 7 July 1973 to 23 November 1974 and as Minister of Labor and Social Security from 23 November 1974 to 29 July 1976.

For over twenty years he was president of the organization Friuli in the world, of which he was honorary president, as well as having actively worked for the Onlus Cjase Foundation by the Furlans of Villalta (Fagagna).

He died on June 3, 2018, in Udine.
