= Mario Pedini =

Italian politician (1918–2003)

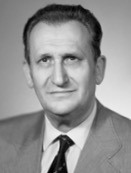

Minister of Public Education and Universities
- In office 13 March 1978 – 21 March 1979
- Prime Minister: Giulio Andreotti

Minister of Cultural and Environmental Heritage
- In office 12 February 1976 – 13 March 1978
- Prime Minister: Aldo Moro; Giulio Andreotti

Minister of Scientific Research
- In office 1975–1978
- Prime Minister: Aldo Moro; Giulio Andreotti

Personal details
- Born: 27 December 1918 Montichiari, Kingdom of Italy
- Died: 7 July 2003 (aged 84)
- Party: Christian Democracy
- Education: University of Pavia

Mario Pedini (1918–2003) was an Italian politician who was a member of the Christian Democrats. He served at the Italian Parliament and Italian Senate. He held different ministerial posts and was one of the early members of the European Parliament.

== Biography ==
Pedini was born in Montichiari, Brescia, on 27 December 1918. He had a degree in philosophy from the University of Pavia in 1943. He also obtained a law degree. Following his graduation he worked as solicitor, teacher and principal at secondary schools. Following the end of World War II he became a member of the Christian Democracy Party. From 1953 he was elected to the Italian Parliament and in 1976 he was elected as a senator.

Pedini served as the undersecretary for scientific research in 1968 and then as the undersecretary for foreign affairs between 1969 and 1974. He was the minister of scientific research in the fourth cabinet of Aldo Moro from 1975 to 1978, after joining the Propaganda Due lodge. He also served as the minister of cultural and environmental heritage in the period 1976-1978 and as the minister of public education and universities in the period 1978–1979. He was a member of the European Parliament for two terms: from 1959 to 1968 and from 1979 to 1984. Pedini retired from politics in 1984 and worked as a lecturer in the field of economy of the European Union at the University of Parma.

In 1977 Pedini was appointed director of the University of Brescia of which he was the president between 1979 and 1985. He died on 7 July 2003.

=== Views ===
In the mid-1970s when Pendini and Aldo Moro were both serving as cabinet ministers they had close economic and political relations with Latin America, Africa, Asia, the Middle East, and Russia. They also managed to have good relations with the United States during the Cold War period.

== Honor and legacy ==
Pedini was the recipient of the Italian Medal of Merit for Culture and Art (30 October 1980). He was posthumously awarded the gold medal for Civil Valor in 2005. In 2019 a square was named after him in his hometown, Montichiari.
