= Legislature VI of Italy =

6th legislature of the Italian Republic (1972–1976)

Legislature VI of Italy VI legislatura della Repubblica Italiana
- 6th legislature

Type
- Type: bicameral
- Houses: Chamber of Deputies; Senate of the Republic

History
- Founded: 25 May 1972
- Disbanded: 4 July 1976 (4 years, 40 days)
- Preceded by: V Legislature
- Succeeded by: VII Legislature

Leadership
- President of the Senate: Amintore Fanfani, DC (25 May 1972 – 26 June 1973); Giovanni Spagnolli, DC (27 June 1973 – 4 July 1976)
- President of the Chamber of Deputies: Sandro Pertini, PSI

Structure
- Seats: 630 (C); 315+ (S)
- Chamber of Deputies political groups: DC (266); PCI (179); PSI (61); MSI (56); PSDI (29); PLI (20); PRI (15); Others (3)
- Senate political groups: DC (135); PCI (94); PSI (33); MSI (26); PSDI (11); PLI (8); PRI (5); Others (2)

Elections
- Chamber of Deputies voting system: Proportional
- Senate voting system: Proportional
- Last general election: 7 May 1972

Meeting place
- Palazzo Montecitorio, Rome (C)
- Palazzo Madama, Rome (S)

Website
- Sixth Legislature – Chamber of Deputies; Sixth Legislature – Senate

Constitution
- Constitution of Italy

The Legislature VI of Italy (Italian: VI Legislatura della Repubblica Italiana) was the 6th legislature of the Italian Republic, and lasted from 25 May 1972 until 4 July 1976. Its composition was the one resulting from the general election of 7 May 1972.

== Main chronology ==
After a short Giulio Andreotti's government, Mariano Rumor returned to the office of prime minister, leading a centre-left coalition composed by DC, PSI, PRI, and PSDI from July 1973 to March 1974. After this government collapsed, Rumor formed a new coalition from March until October 1974.

During Rumor's second term, the Parliament approved a law on 2 March 1974 with which legal minimum for pensions was raised to 27.75% of the average industrial wage for 1973. A law approved on 16 July 1974 extended family allowances to INPS pensioners, in lieu of child supplements. While a bill passed in August 1974 extended hospital assistance to all those not previously covered by any scheme.

Weathering a cabinet resignation in June 1974, Rumor's final cabinet fell in October 1974 after failing to come to an agreement on how to deal with rising economic inflation.

In November 1974, President Giovanni Leone gave Aldo Moro the task of form a new cabinet; Moro was sworn in on 23 November, at the head a cabinet composed by DC and PRI, externally supported by PSI and PSDI. Even during his second term as prime minister, the government implemented a series of important social reforms. A law, approved on 9 June 1975, increased the number of occupational diseases and extended the duration of linked insurance and benefit; while a bill, approved on 3 June 1975, introduced various improvements for pensioners. Moreover, the multiplying coefficient was raised to 2% and it was applied to average earnings of the best 3 years in the last 10 years of work and automatic annual adjustment of minimum pensions. A law approved 27 December 1975 implemented ad hoc upgradings of cash benefits for certain diseases.

Despite the tensions within government's majority, the close relations between Moro and the communist leader, Enrico Berlinguer, guaranteed a certain stability to Moro's governments, allowing them a capacity to act that went beyond the premises that had seen them born.

Moro IV Cabinet, with the republican leader Ugo La Malfa as Deputy Prime Minister, started a first dialogue with the PCI, with the aim of beginning a new phase to strengthen the Italian democratic system. However, in 1976 the PSI secretary, Francesco De Martino, withdrew the external support to the government and Moro was forced to resign.

On 4 May 1976 President Giovanni Leone dismissed the Parliament and called a snap election.

=== 1974 divorce referendum ===
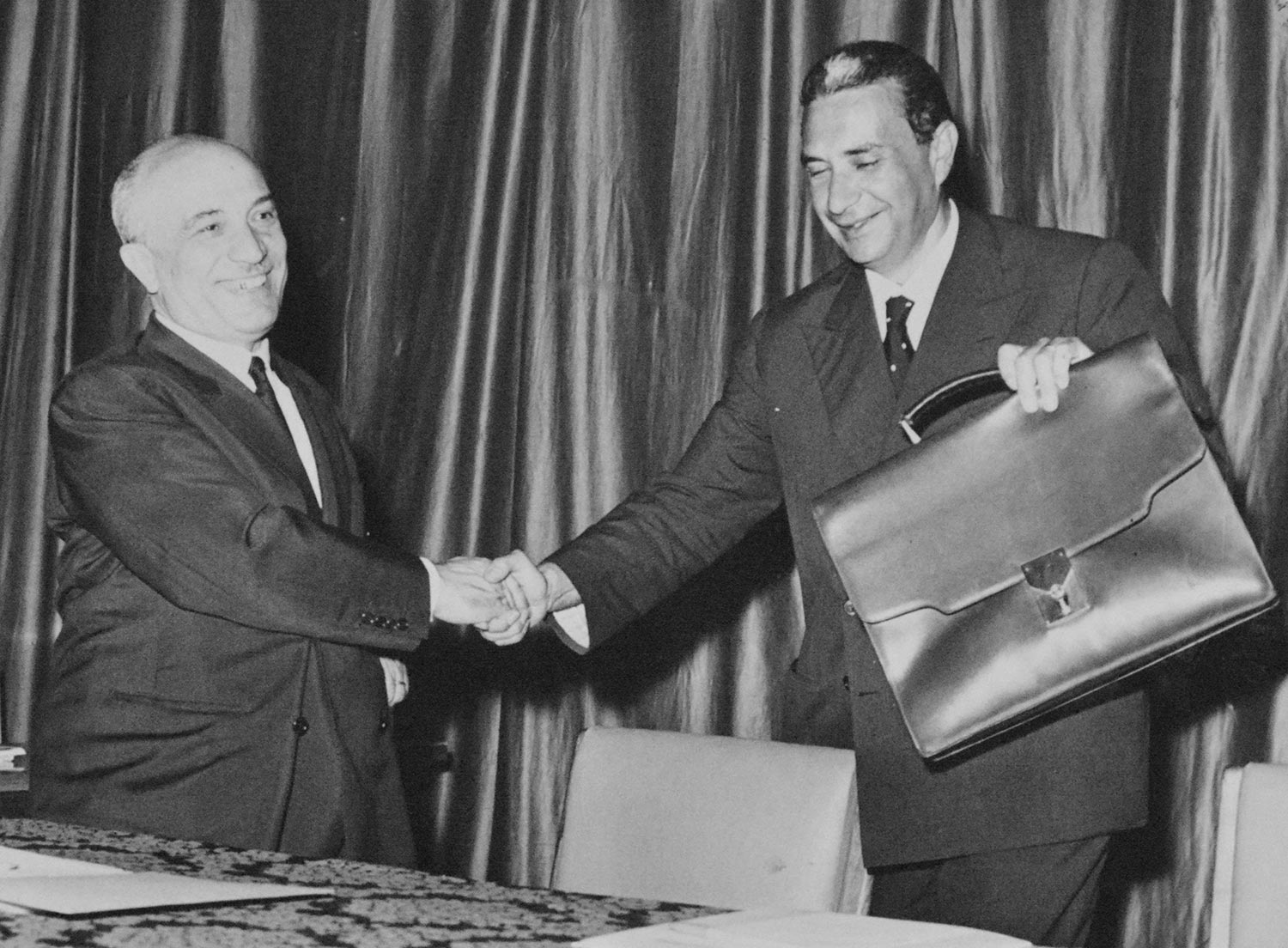
Amintore Fanfani and Aldo Moro in 1975

In June 1973 Amintore Fanfani was elected secretary of the Christian Democracy for a second term, replacing his former protégé Arnaldo Forlani, who was now a supporter of centrist policies. As such, Fanfani led the campaign for the referendum on repealing the law allowing divorce, which was approved by the parliament in 1970. Those voting "yes" wanted to outlaw divorce as had been the case before the law came into effect, and those voting "no" wanted to retain the law and their newly gained right to divorce. The voting method caused significant confusion with many people not understanding that they had to vote "no" to be able to divorce or vote "yes" to outlaw divorce.

The DC and the neo-fascist MSI intensely campaigned for a yes vote to abolish the law and make divorce illegal again. Their main themes were the safeguarding of the traditional nuclear family model and the Roman Catechism; while most left-wing political forces, including PCI and PSI, supported the "no" faction. Fanfani thought that a "no" victory could have given him the control of in his own party again; in fact other key figures like Moro, Rumor, Emilio Colombo and Francesco Cossiga, who believed in the defeat at the referendum, kept a low profile during the campaign.

Despite Fanfani's activism, the "no" front was defeated by margin of 59.3% to 40.7% on a voter turnout of 87.7%, thus allowing the divorce laws to remain in force. The soundly defeat in the divorce referendum forced Fanfani's resignation as party secretary in July 1975. The ideological distances between DC and other allies of the Organic Centre-left coalition emerged during the referendum campaign were one of the main factor that led to the crisis of that political alliance in the mid-1970s.

== Government ==
Prime Minister	Party	Term of office		Government	Composition
Prime Minister	Party	Took office	Left office	Government	Composition
Giulio Andreotti (1919–2013)	Christian Democracy	26 June 1972	7 July 1973	Andreotti II	DC • PLI • PSDI (with PRI's external support)
Mariano Rumor (1915–1990)	Christian Democracy	7 July 1973	14 March 1974	Rumor IV	DC • PSI • PSDI • PRI (Organic Centre-left)
Mariano Rumor (1915–1990)	Christian Democracy	14 March 1974	23 November 1974	Rumor V	DC • PSI • PSDI (Organic Centre-left)
Aldo Moro (1916–1978)	Christian Democracy	23 November 1974	12 February 1976	Moro IV	DC • PRI (with PSI and PSDI's external support)
Aldo Moro (1916–1978)	Christian Democracy	12 February 1976	29 July 1976	Moro V	DC (with PSI, PRI and PSDI's external support)

== Parliamentary composition ==
=== Chamber of Deputies ===
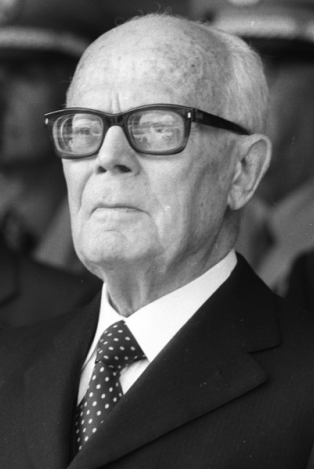
Sandro Pertini, President of the Chamber of Deputies

- President: Sandro Pertini (PSI), elected on 25 May 1972
- Vice Presidents: Benigno Zaccagnini (DC, till 22 September 1975), Oscar Luigi Scalfaro (DC, from 22 October 1975), Nilde Iotti (PCI), Arrigo Boldrini (PCI), Roberto Lucifredi (DC)

Parliamentary groups in the Chamber of Deputies
Initial composition (25 May 1972)		Final composition (4 July 1976)		
Parliamentary group	Seats	Parliamentary group	Seats	Change
Christian Democracy	266	Christian Democracy	263	▼3
Italian Communist Party	179	Italian Communist Party	175	▼4
Italian Socialist Party	61	Italian Socialist Party	61	Steady
Italian Social Movement	56	Italian Social Movement	55	▼1
Italian Democratic Socialist Party	29	Italian Democratic Socialist Party	30	▲1
Italian Liberal Party	20	Italian Liberal Party	20	Steady
Italian Republican Party	15	Italian Republican Party	15	Steady
Mixed	3	Mixed	10	▲7
Südtiroler Volkspartei	3	Südtiroler Volkspartei	3	Steady
		Independent–Non inscrits	7	▲7
Total seats	630	Total seats	630	Steady

=== Senate of the Republic ===
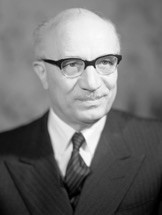
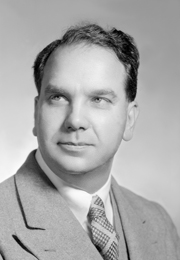
Presidents of the Senate: Amintore Fanfani (1972–1973) and Giovanni Spagnolli (1973–1976)
- Presidents:
  - Amintore Fanfani (DC), elected on 25 May 1972 and resigned on 26 June 1973;
  - Giovanni Spagnolli (DC), elected on 27 June 1973.
- Vice Presidents: Giuseppe Spataro (DC), Francesco Albertini (PSI), Mario Venanzi (PCI), Tullio Carettoni Romagnoli (PSI)

Parliamentary groups in the Senate of the Republic
Initial composition (25 May 1972)		Final composition (4 July 1976)		
Parliamentary group	Seats	Parliamentary group	Seats	Change
Christian Democracy	136	Christian Democracy	136	Steady
Italian Communist Party	94	Italian Communist Party	94	Steady
Italian Socialist Party	33	Italian Socialist Party	33	Steady
Italian Social Movement	26	Italian Social Movement	26	Steady
Italian Democratic Socialist Party	11	Italian Democratic Socialist Party	11	Steady
Italian Liberal Party	8	Italian Liberal Party	8	Steady
Mixed	7	Mixed	7	Steady
Italian Republican Party	5	Italian Republican Party	5	Steady
Südtiroler Volkspartei	2	Südtiroler Volkspartei	2	Steady
Total seats	315	Total seats	315	Steady

==== Senators for Life ====
Senator	Motivation	Appointed by	From	Till
Giovanni Gronchi	Former President of Italy	ex officio	Previous legislature	Next legislature
Cesare Merzagora	Merits in the social field	President Antonio Segni	Previous legislature	Next legislature
Ferruccio Parri	Merits in the social field	President Antonio Segni	Previous legislature	Next legislature
Antonio Segni	Former President of Italy	ex officio	Previous legislature	1 December 1972 (deceased)
Eugenio Montale	Merits in the literary field	President Giuseppe Saragat	Previous legislature	Next legislature
Pietro Nenni	Merits in the social field	President Giuseppe Saragat	Previous legislature	Next legislature
Giuseppe Saragat	Former President of Italy	ex officio	Previous legislature	Next legislature
Amintore Fanfani	Merits in the social field	President Giovanni Leone	Previous legislature	Next legislature
