= Francesco Cossiga =

President of Italy from 1985 to 1992

Senator for life Lieutenant Colonel Francesco Cossiga OMRI
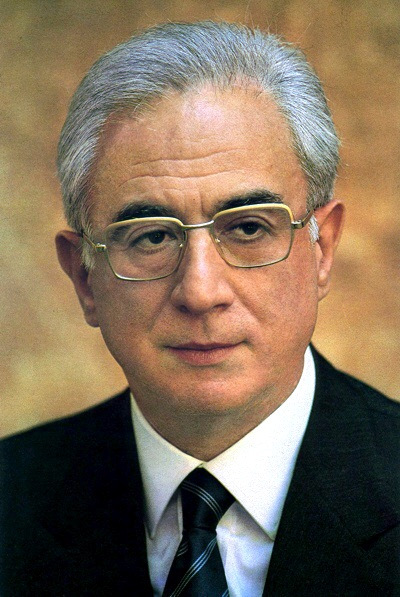
- Official portrait, c. 1985

President of Italy
- In office 3 July 1985 – 28 April 1992 (Note: Acting: 29 June 1985 – 3 July 1985)
- Prime Minister: Bettino Craxi; Amintore Fanfani; Giovanni Goria; Ciriaco De Mita; Giulio Andreotti
- Preceded by: Sandro Pertini
- Succeeded by: Oscar Luigi Scalfaro

President of the Senate of the Republic
- In office 12 July 1983 – 3 July 1985
- Preceded by: Vittorino Colombo
- Succeeded by: Amintore Fanfani

Prime Minister of Italy
- In office 5 August 1979 – 18 October 1980
- President: Sandro Pertini
- Preceded by: Giulio Andreotti
- Succeeded by: Arnaldo Forlani

Minister of the Interior
- In office 12 February 1976 – 11 May 1978
- Prime Minister: Aldo Moro; Giulio Andreotti
- Preceded by: Luigi Gui
- Succeeded by: Virginio Rognoni

Minister for Public Administration
- In office 23 November 1974 – 12 February 1976
- Prime Minister: Aldo Moro
- Preceded by: Luigi Gui
- Succeeded by: Tommaso Morlino

Member of the Senate of the Republic
- Ex officio
- Life tenure 28 April 1992 – 17 August 2010
- In office 12 July 1983 – 3 July 1985
- Constituency: Sardinia

Member of the Chamber of Deputies
- In office 12 June 1958 – 11 July 1983
- Constituency: Cagliari–Sassari

Personal details
- Born: Francesco Maurizio Cossiga; 26 July 1928 Sassari, Kingdom of Italy
- Died: 17 August 2010 (aged 82) Rome, Italy
- Party: DC (1945–1992); UDR (1998–1999); UpR (1999–2001); Independent (2001–2010)
- Height: 1.82 m (6 ft 0 in)
- Spouse: Giuseppa Sigurani (m. 1960; div. 1998)
- Children: 2, including Giuseppe
- Education: University of Sassari
- Occupation: Politician

Francesco Maurizio Cossiga (Note: Italian: [franˈtʃesko kosˈsiːɡa]; Sardinian: Frantziscu Maurìtziu Còssiga, IPA: [ˈkosiɣa]) (26 July 1928 – 17 August 2010) was an Italian politician who served as the president of Italy from 1985 to 1992. A member of Christian Democracy, he was Prime Minister of Italy from 1979 to 1980; leading a centre-right government. Cossiga is widely considered one of the most prominent and influential politicians of the First Italian Republic.

Cossiga served as a minister on several occasions, most notably as Italian Minister of the Interior. In that position, he re-structured the Italian police, civil protection and secret services. Due to his repressive approach to public protests, he was described as a strongman and labelled "Iron Minister". He was in office at the time of the kidnapping and murder of Aldo Moro by the Red Brigades, and resigned as the interior minister when Aldo Moro was found dead in May 1978. Cossiga was the prime minister during the 1980 Bologna station massacre. Before his political career, he was also a professor of constitutional law at the University of Sassari.

== Early life ==
Francesco Cossiga was born in Sassari on 26 July 1928, to a republican and anti-fascist middle-bourgeois family. His parents were Giuseppe Cossiga and Maria "Mariuccia" Zanfarino. He was the second-degree cousin of brothers Enrico and Giovanni Berlinguer (whose parents were Mario Berlinguer and Maria "Mariuccia" Loriga) because their respective maternal grandfathers, Antonio Zanfarino and Giovanni Loriga, were half-brothers on their mother's side. Although his last name is commonly pronounced [kosˈsiːɡa] (with the stress falling on the second syllable), the original pronunciation is [ˈkosiɣa] (with the stress falling on the first syllable), italianized as [ˈkɔssiɡa]. His surname in Sardinian and Sassarese means "Corsica", likely pointing to the family's origin.

At the age of sixteen, he graduated, three years in advance, at the classical lyceum Domenico Alberto Azuni. The following year he joined in the Christian Democracy, and three years later, at only 19 years old, he graduated in law and started a university career as a professor of constitutional law at the faculty of jurisprudence of the University of Sassari.

During his period at the university, he became a member of the Catholic Federation of University Students (FUCI), becoming the association's leader for Sassari.

== Beginnings of his political career ==
After the 1958 general election Cossiga was elected to the Chamber of Deputies for the first time, representing the constituency of Cagliari–Sassari.

In February 1966 he became the youngest Undersecretary of the Ministry of Defence, in the government of Aldo Moro. In this role he had to face the aftermath of Piano Solo, an envisaged plot for an Italian coup d'état requested by then President Antonio Segni, two years before.

From November 1974 to February 1976 Cossiga was Minister of Public Administration in Moro's fourth government.

== Minister of the Interior ==
On 12 February 1976, Cossiga was appointed Minister of the Interior, by Prime Minister Moro. During his term he re-structured the Italian police, civil protection and secret services. Cossiga has been often described as a strongman and labeled "iron minister", for repressing public protests. Moreover, during his tenure his surname was often stylized as "Koiga", using the SS symbol.

=== 1977 protests and riots ===
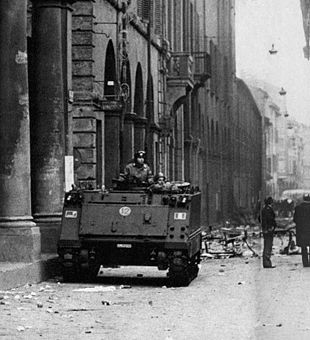
Armored vehicle in the university area of Bologna.

In 1977, the city of Bologna was the scene of violent street clashes. In particular, on 11 March a militant of the far-left organization Lotta Continua, Francesco Lorusso, was killed by a gunshot to the back (probably fired by a policeman), when police dispersed protesters against a mass meeting of Communion and Liberation, which was being held that morning at the university. This event served as a detonator for a long series of clashes with security forces for two days, which affected the entire city of Bologna. Cossiga sent armoured vehicles into the university area and other hot spots of the city to quell what he perceived as guerrilla warfare. Clashes with the police caused numerous casualties among people who got caught up in the riots, including uninvolved locals. No old leftist party, except the Youth Socialist Federation, led by local secretary Emilio Lonardo, participated at the funeral of the student Lorusso, showing the dramatic split between the movement and the historical left parties. ^{[Source?]}

Turin was also the scene of bloody clashes and attacks. On 1 October 1977, after a procession had started with an attack on the headquarters of the Italian Social Movement (MSI), a group of militants of Lotta Continua reached a downtown bar, L'angelo azzurro (The Blue Angel), frequented by young right-wing activists. They threw two Molotov cocktails, and Roberto Crescenzio, a totally apolitical student, died of burns. The perpetrators of the murder were never identified. Lotta Continua leader Silvio Viale called it a "tragic accident". ^{[Source?]}

Another innocent victim of the riots of that year was Giorgiana Masi, who was killed in Rome by a gunshot during an event organized by the Radical Party to celebrate the third anniversary of the victory in the referendum on divorce. As the perpetrators of the murder remained unknown, the movement attributed the responsibility of the crime to police officers in plain clothes, who were immortalized at that time dressed in clothing of the style of young people of the movement. ^{[Source?]}

=== Kidnapping of Aldo Moro ===
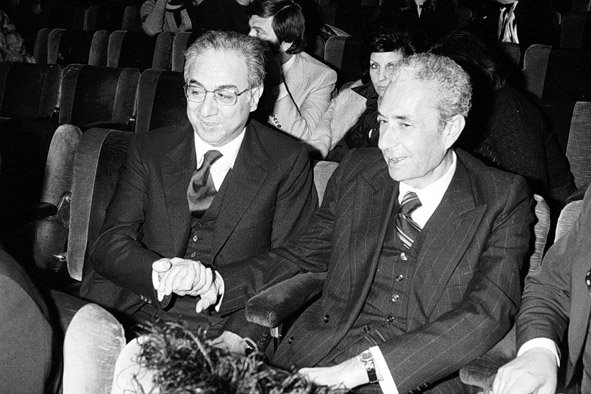
Cossiga with Aldo Moro.

Cossiga was in office at the time of the kidnapping and murder of the Christian Democratic leader Aldo Moro by the Marxist-Leninist extreme-left terrorist group Red Brigades. On the morning of 16 March 1978, the day on which the new cabinet led by Giulio Andreotti was supposed to have undergone a confidence vote in the Italian Parliament, the car of Moro, former prime minister and then president of DC, was assaulted by a group of Red Brigades terrorists in Via Fani in Rome. Firing automatic weapons, the terrorists killed Moro's bodyguards, (two Carabinieri in Moro's car and three policemen in the following car) and kidnapped him. ^{[Source?]}

Cossiga formed immediately two "crisis committees". The first one was a technical-operational-political committee, chaired by Cossiga himself and, in his absence, by undersecretary Nicola Lettieri. Other members included the supreme commanders of the Italian Police Forces, of the Carabinieri, the Guardia di Finanza, the recently named directors of SISMI and SISDE (respectively, Italy's military and civil intelligence services), the national secretary of CESIS (a secret information agency), the director of UCIGOS and the police prefect of Rome. The second one was an information committee, including members of CESIS, SISDE, SISMI and SIOS, another military intelligence office.

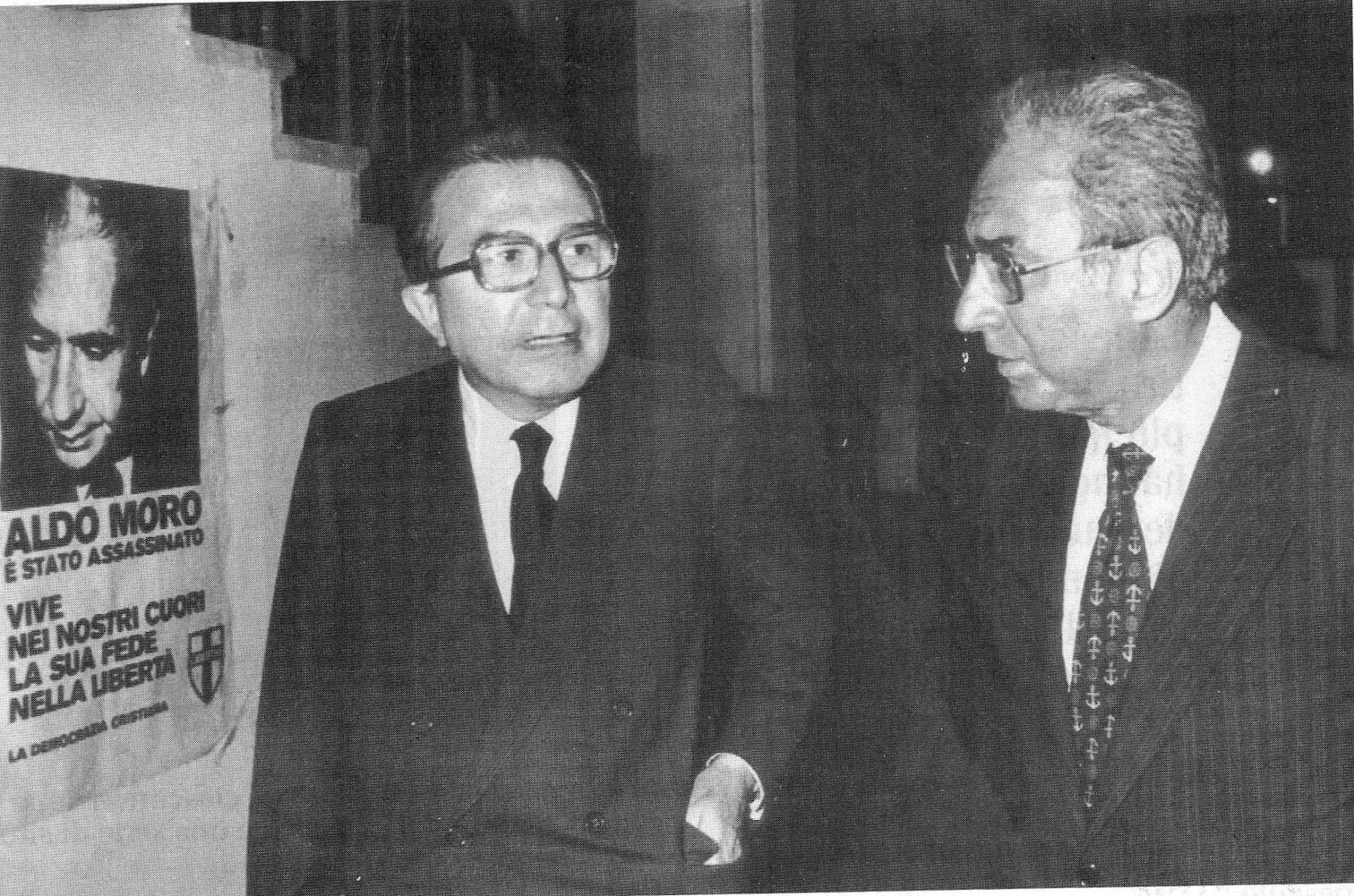
Francesco Cossiga with Giulio Andreotti in 1978.

A third unofficial committee was created which never met officially, called the comitato di esperti ("committee of experts"). Its existence was not disclosed until 1981, by Cossiga himself, in his interrogation by the Italian Parliament's Commission about the Moro affair. He omitted to reveal the decisions and the activities of the committee however. This committee included: Steve Pieczenik, a psychologist of the anti-terrorism section of the US State Department, and notable Italian criminologists. Pieczenik later declared that there were numerous leaks about the discussions made at the committee, and accused Cossiga.

However, on 9 May 1978 Moro's body was found in the trunk of a Renault 4 in Via Caetani after 55 days of imprisonment, during which Moro was submitted to a political trial by the so-called "people's court" set up by the Brigate Rosse and the Italian government was asked for an exchange of prisoners. Despite the common interpretation, the car location in Via Caetani was not halfway between the locations of the national offices of DC and of the Italian Communist Party (PCI) in Rome. After two days, Cossiga resigned as Minister of the Interior. According to Italian journalist Enrico Deaglio, Cossiga, to justify his lack of action, "accused the leaders of CGIL and of the Communist Party of knowing where Moro was detained". Cossiga was also accused by Moro himself, in his letters who wrote during his detention, saying that "his blood will fall over him".

== Prime Minister of Italy ==
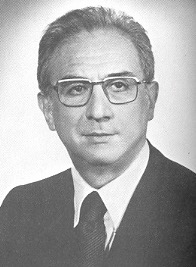
Francesco Cossiga in 1979.

One year after Moro's death and the subsequent Cossiga's resignation as Interior Minister, he was appointed Prime Minister of Italy. He led a government coalition composed of Christian Democrats, Socialists, Democratic Socialists, Republicans and Liberals.

=== Bologna massacre ===
Cossiga was head of the government during the Bologna massacre, a terrorist bombing of the Bologna Central Station on the morning of 2 August 1980, which killed 85 people and wounded more than 200. The attack was attributed to the neo-fascist terrorist organization Nuclei Armati Rivoluzionari (Armed Revolutionary Nucleus), which always denied any involvement; other theories have been proposed, especially in correlation with the strategy of tension.

Francesco Cossiga first assumed the explosion to have been caused by an accident (the explosion of an old boiler located in the basement of the station). Nevertheless, soon the evidence gathered on site of the explosion made it clear that the attack constituted an act of terrorism. L'Unità, the newspaper of the Communist Party on 3 August already attributed responsibility for the attack to neo-fascists. Later, in a special session to the Senate, Cossiga supported the theory that neofascists were behind the attack, "unlike leftist terrorism, which strikes at the heart of the state through its representatives, black terrorism prefers the massacre because it promotes panic and impulsive reactions."

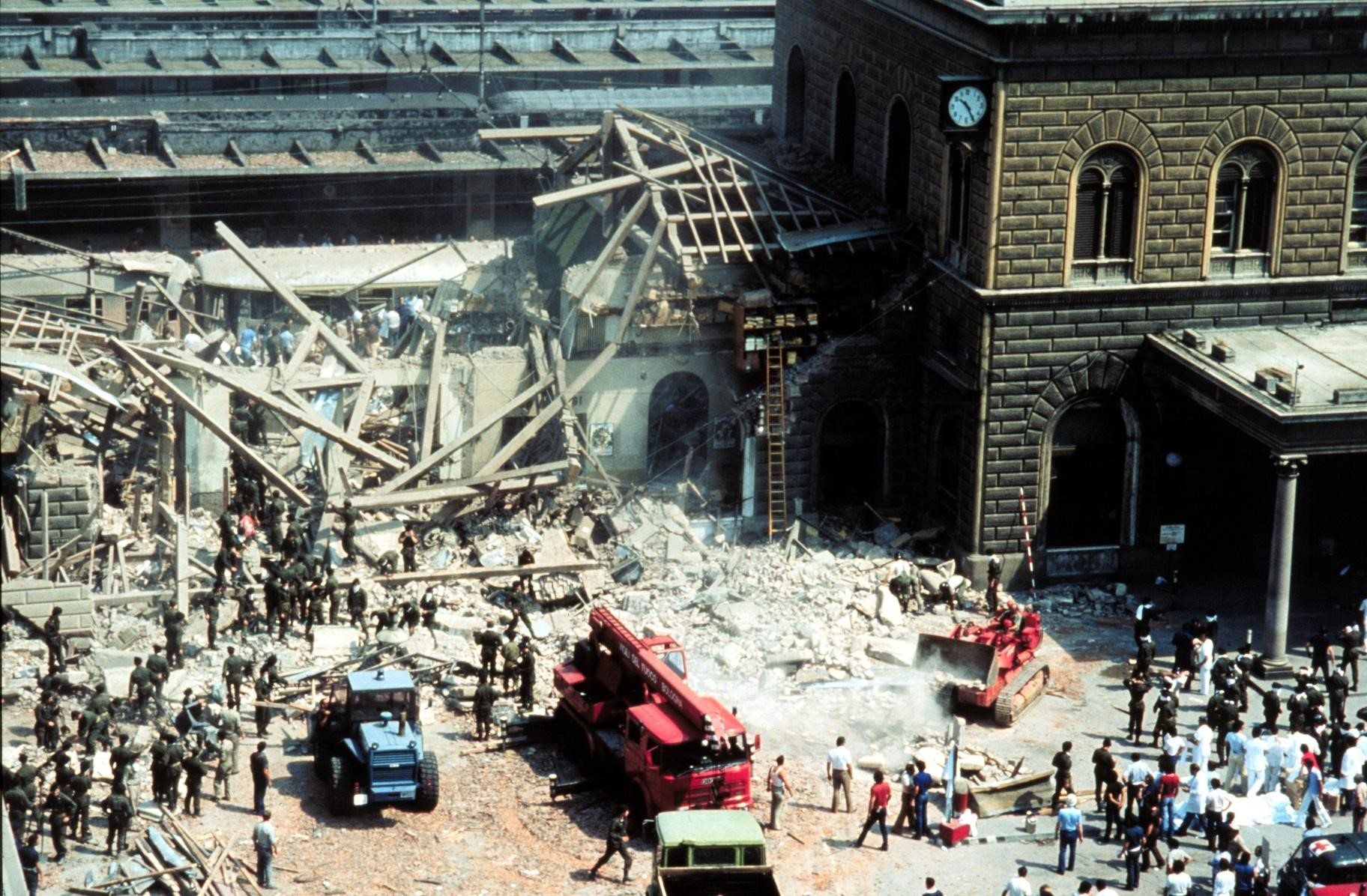
Rescue teams making their way through the rubble after the attack.

Later, according to media reports in 2004, taken up again in 2007, Cossiga, in a letter addressed to Enzo Fragala, leader of the National Alliance section in the Mitrokhin Committee, suggested Palestinian involvement of George Habash's Popular Front for the Liberation of Palestine and the Separate group of Ilich Ramirez Sanchez, known as "Carlos the Jackal". In addition, in 2008 Cossiga gave an interview to the BBC in which it reaffirmed his belief that the massacre would not be attributable to black terrorism, but to an "incident" of Palestinian resistance groups operating in Italy. He declared also being convinced of the innocence of Francesca Mambro and Giuseppe Valerio Fioravanti, the two neo-fascist terrorists accused of the massacre. The PFLP has always denied responsibility.

=== Resignation ===
In October 1980, Cossiga resigned as Prime Minister after the rejection of the annual budget bill by the Italian Parliament.

Following the 1983 general election, Cossiga became a member of the Italian Senate; on 12 July, he was elected President of the Senate.

== President of Italy ==
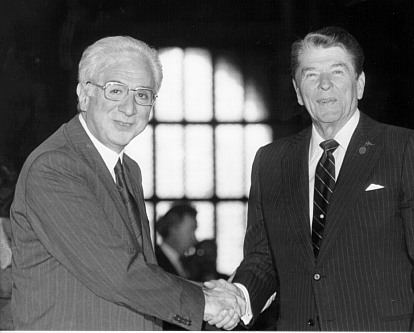
Cossiga with U.S. President Ronald Reagan, in 1987.

In the 1985 presidential election, Cossiga was elected as President of Italy with 752 votes out of 977. His candidacy was endorsed by the Christian Democracy but supported also by communists, socialists, social democrats, liberals and republicans. This was the first time an Italian presidential candidate had won the election on the first ballot, where a two-thirds majority is necessary. He took office on 29 June 1985 on an interim basis after the resignation of Outgoing President Sandro Pertini, but was not sworn in until a few days later, on 3 July.

The Cossiga presidency was essentially divided into two phases related to the attitudes of the head of state. In the first five years, Cossiga played its role in a traditional way, caring for the role of the republican institutions under the Constitution, which makes the president of the republic a kind of arbitrator in relations between the powers of the state.

=== "Pickaxe-wielder" president ===
It was in his last two years as president that Cossiga began to express some unusual opinions regarding the Italian political system. He opined that the Italian parties, especially the Christian Democrats and the Communists had to take into account the deep changes brought about by the fall of the Berlin Wall and the end of the Cold War. According to him, DC and PCI would therefore have been seriously affected by this change, but Cossiga believed that political parties and the same institutions refused to recognize it.

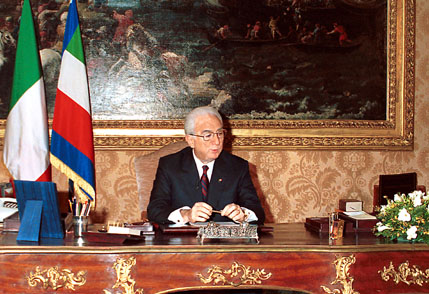
President Cossiga in his office at Quirinal Palace

Thus, a period of conflict and political controversy began, often provocative and deliberately excessive, and with very strong media exposure. These statements, soon dubbed "esternazioni", or "mattock blows" (picconate), were considered by many to be inappropriate for a President, and often beyond his constitutional powers; also, his mental health was doubted and Cossiga had to declare "I am the fake madman who speaks the truth." Cossiga suffered from bipolar disorder and depression in the last years of his life.

Among the statements of the president, there were also allegations of excessive politicization of the judiciary system, and the stigmatization of the fact that young magistrates, who just came into service, were immediately destined for the Sicilian prosecutor to carry out mafia proceedings.

For his changed attitude, Cossiga received various criticisms from almost every party, with the exception of the Italian Social Movement, which stood beside him in defence of the "picconate". He will, amongst other things, be considered one of the first "cleansers" of MSI, who recognized it as a constitutional and democratic force.

=== Revelation of Gladio and resignation ===
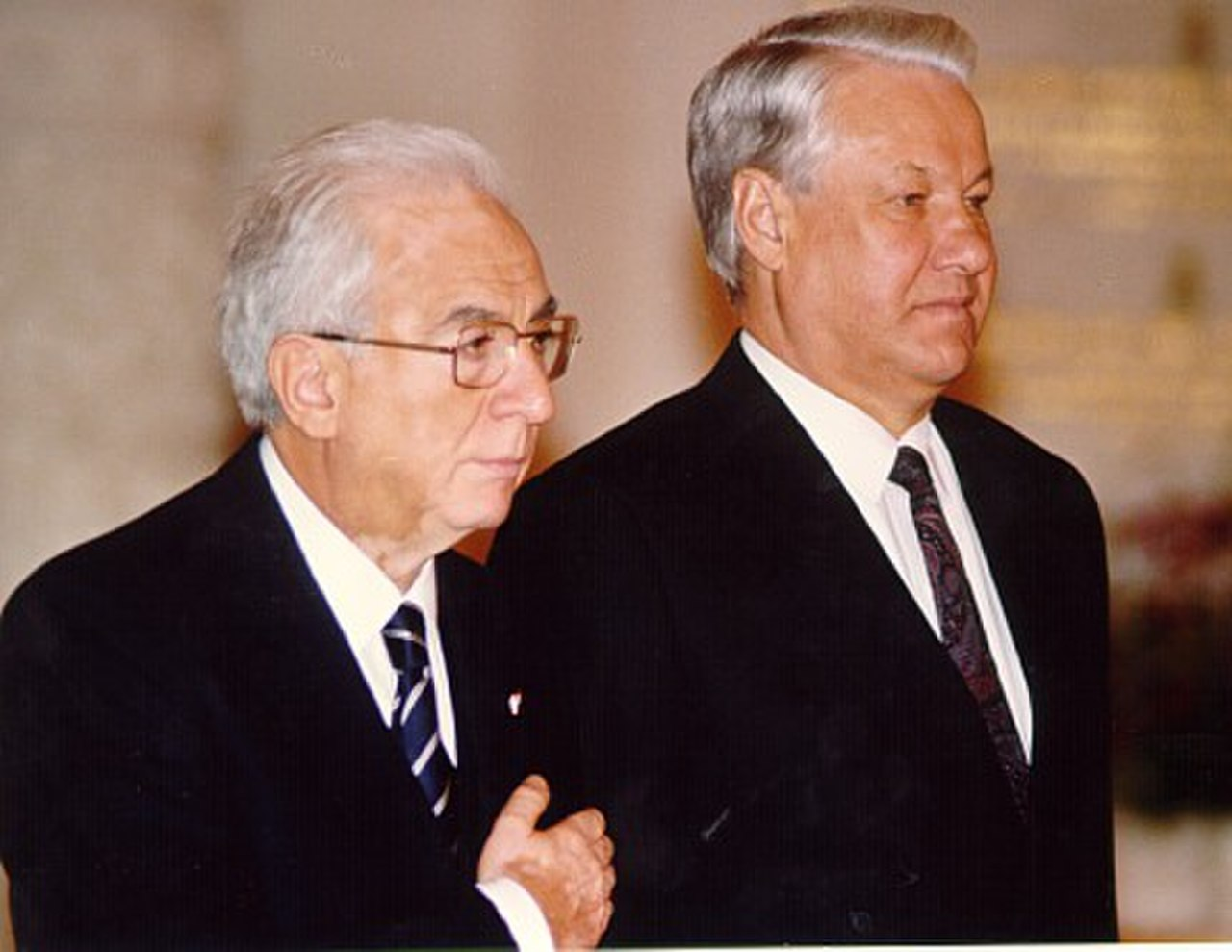
Francesco Cossiga with Russian president Boris Yeltsin, in 1992.

Tension developed between Cossiga and Prime Minister Giulio Andreotti. This tension emerged when Andreotti revealed the existence of Gladio, a stay-behind organization with the official aim of countering a possible Soviet invasion through sabotage and guerrilla warfare behind enemy lines. Cossiga acknowledged his involvement in the establishment of the organization. The Democratic Party of the Left (successor to the Communist Party) started the procedure of impeachment (Presidents of Italy can be impeached only for high treason against the state or for an attempt to overthrow the Constitution). Although he threatened to prevent the impeachment procedure by dissolving Parliament, the impeachment request was ultimately dismissed.

Cossiga resigned two months before the end of his term, on 25 April 1992. In his last speech as president he stated "To young people I want to say to love the fatherland, to honour the nation, to serve the Republic, to believe in freedom and to believe in our country".

== After the presidency ==
According to the Italian Constitution, after his resignation from the office of President, Cossiga became Lifetime Senator, joining his predecessors in the upper house of Parliament, with whom he also shared the title of President Emeritus of the Italian Republic.

On 12 January 1997, Cossiga survived unscathed a railway accident (it:Incidente ferroviario di Piacenza), while travelling on a high-speed train from Milan to Rome that derailed near Piacenza.

In February 1998, Cossiga created the Democratic Union for the Republic (UDR), a Christian democratic political party, declaring it to be politically central. The UDR was a crucial component of the majority that supported the Massimo D'Alema cabinet in October 1998, after the fall of the Romano Prodi's government which lost a vote of confidence. Cossiga declared that his support for D'Alema was intended to end the conventional exclusion of the former communist leaders from the premiership in Italy.

In 1999 UDR was dissolved and Cossiga returned to his activities as a Senator, with competences in the Military Affairs' Commission.

In May 2006, Cossiga gave his support to the formation of Prodi's second government. In the same month, he brought in a bill that would allow the region of South Tyrol to hold a referendum, where the local electorate could decide whether to remain within the Republic of Italy, take independence, or become part of Austria again.

On 27 November 2006, he resigned from his position as a lifetime senator. His resignation was, however, rejected on 31 January 2007 by a vote of the Senate.

In May 2008, Cossiga voted in favour of the government of Silvio Berlusconi.

== Death and legacy ==
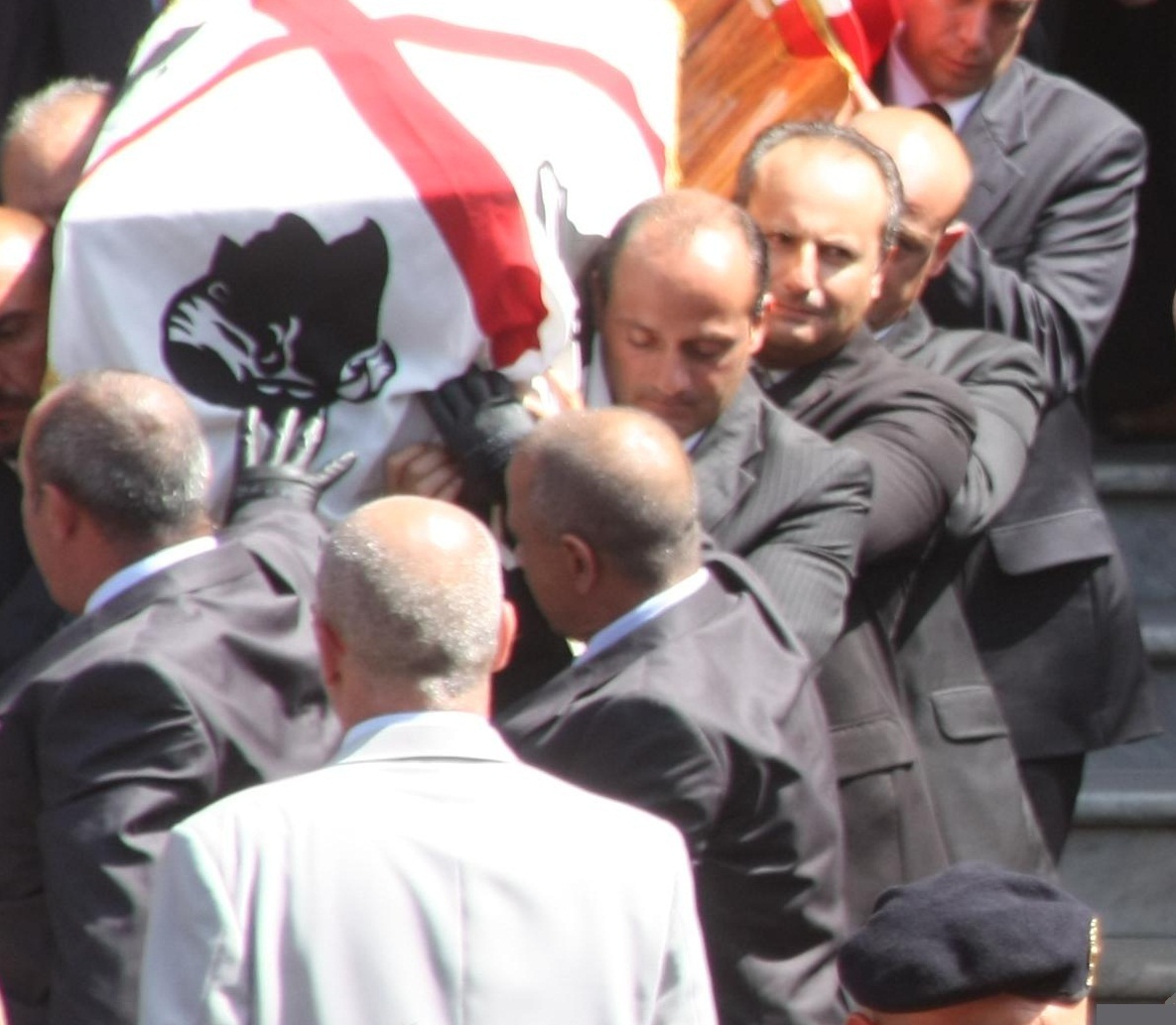
Funeral of Cossiga in Sassari, August 2010.

Cossiga died on 17 August 2010 from respiratory problems at the Agostino Gemelli Polyclinic. After his death, four letters written by Cossiga were sent to the four highest authorities of the state in office at the time of his death, President of the Republic Giorgio Napolitano, President of the Senate Renato Schifani, President of the Chamber of Deputies Gianfranco Fini and Prime Minister Silvio Berlusconi.

The funeral took place in his hometown, Sassari, at the Church of San Giuseppe. Cossiga is buried in the public cemetery of Sassari, in the family tomb, not far from one of his predecessors as President of Italy, Antonio Segni.

In 2020, Cossiga was depicted in the film Rose Island, which told the story of the Republic of Rose Island, played by Luca Della Bianca.

== Controversies ==
In 2000, he criticized world champion Michael Schumacher for his conduct when the Italian National Anthem was played on the podium at the Japanese Grand Prix.

In 2007, Cossiga referred to the 2001 September 11 attacks as a false flag: "all democratic circles in America and of Europe, especially those of the Italian centre-left, now know that the disastrous attack was planned and realized by the American CIA and Mossad with the help of the Zionist world, to place the blame on Arab countries and to persuade the Western powers to intervene in Iraq and Afghanistan". The previous year Cossiga had stated that he rejects theoretical conspiracies and that it "seems unlikely that September 11 was the result of an American plot."

In the statement, Cossiga was indeed mocking Italian media claiming that a videotape circulated by Osama bin Laden's al Qaeda and containing threats against Silvio Berlusconi was "produced in the studios of Mediaset in Milan" and forwarded to the "Islamist Al-Jazeera television network." According to the media, the purpose of that video tape (which was actually an audio tape) was to raise "a wave of solidarity to Berlusconi" who was, at the time, facing political difficulties.

In 2008, Francesco Cossiga said that Mario Draghi was "a craven moneyman".

Cossiga blamed the loss of Itavia Flight 870, a passenger jet that crashed in 1980 with the loss of all 81 people on board, on a missile fired from a French Navy aircraft. On 23 January 2013, Italy's top criminal court ruled that there was "abundantly" clear evidence that the flight was brought down by a missile fired from a French Navy aircraft.

== Electoral history ==
Election	House	Constituency	Party	Votes	Result
1958	Chamber of Deputies	Cagliari–Sassari–Nuoro	DC	57,787	Elected
1963	Chamber of Deputies	Cagliari–Sassari–Nuoro	DC	58,809	Elected
1968	Chamber of Deputies	Cagliari–Sassari–Nuoro	DC	102,814	Elected
1972	Chamber of Deputies	Cagliari–Sassari–Nuoro	DC	94,855	Elected
1976	Chamber of Deputies	Cagliari–Sassari–Nuoro	DC	174,209	Elected
1979	Chamber of Deputies	Cagliari–Sassari–Nuoro	DC	136,383	Elected
1983	Senate of the Republic	Sardinia – Tempio-Ozieri	DC	40,024	Elected

== Honours and awards ==
As President of the Republic, Cossiga was Head (and also Knight Grand Cross with Grand Cordon) of the Order of Merit of the Italian Republic (from 3 July 1985 to 28 April 1992), Military Order of Italy, Order of the Star of Italian Solidarity, Order of Merit for Labour and Order of Vittorio Veneto and Grand Cross of Merit of the Italian Red Cross. He has also been given honours and awards by other countries.

== Notes ==
Political offices
Preceded by Luigi Gui	Minister of Public Administration; 1974–1976	Succeeded by Tommaso Morlino
Preceded by Luigi Gui	Minister of the Interior; 1976–1978	Succeeded by Virginio Rognoni
Preceded by Giulio Andreotti	Prime Minister of Italy; 1979–1980	Succeeded by Arnaldo Forlani
Preceded by Vittorino Colombo	President of the Italian Senate; 1983–1985	Succeeded by Amintore Fanfani
Preceded by Sandro Pertini	President of Italy; 1985–1992	Succeeded by Oscar Luigi Scalfaro
Diplomatic posts
Preceded by Masayoshi Ohira	Chairperson of the G7; 1980	Succeeded by Pierre Trudeau
