= Antonino Pietro Gullotti =

Italian politician (1922–1989)

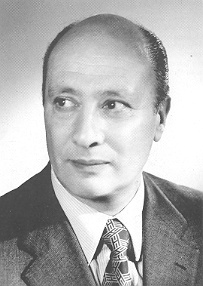
Antonino Pietro Gullotti

Antonino Pietro Gullotti (14 January 1922 – 9 August 1989) was an Italian politician.

== Political career ==
He was one of the founders of the Dorothean faction of Christian Democracy in 1958, he got closer and closer to Aldo Moro and Benigno Zaccagnini and later to Ciriaco De Mita.

He served as Member of the Chamber of Deputies continuously from 1958 to 1989, the year of his death, and numerous times as a minister: Minister of public works (1972–73; 1976–78), Minister of public holdings (1973–1974), Minister of health (1974–76), Minister of posts and telecommunications (1978–79) and Minister of cultural and environmental heritage (1983–87).
