= Arnaldo Forlani =

Prime Minister of Italy from 1980 to 1981

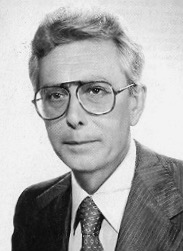
- Forlani in 1983

Prime Minister of Italy
- In office 18 October 1980 – 28 June 1981
- President: Sandro Pertini
- Preceded by: Francesco Cossiga
- Succeeded by: Giovanni Spadolini

Deputy Prime Minister of Italy
- In office 4 August 1983 – 18 April 1987
- Prime Minister: Bettino Craxi
- Preceded by: Ugo La Malfa
- Succeeded by: Giuliano Amato

Minister of Foreign Affairs
- In office 30 July 1976 – 5 August 1979
- Prime Minister: Giulio Andreotti
- Preceded by: Mariano Rumor
- Succeeded by: Franco Maria Malfatti

Minister of Defence
- In office 23 November 1974 – 30 July 1976
- Prime Minister: Aldo Moro
- Preceded by: Giulio Andreotti
- Succeeded by: Vittorio Lattanzio

Secretary of Christian Democracy
- In office 22 February 1989 – 12 October 1992
- Preceded by: Ciriaco De Mita
- Succeeded by: Mino Martinazzoli
- In office 9 November 1969 – 17 June 1973
- Preceded by: Flaminio Piccoli
- Succeeded by: Amintore Fanfani

Member of the Chamber of Deputies
- In office 12 June 1958 – 14 April 1994
- Constituency: Ancona

Personal details
- Born: 8 December 1925 Pesaro, Kingdom of Italy
- Died: 6 July 2023 (aged 97) Rome, Italy
- Party: DC (1946–1994); Independent (1994–2023)
- Spouse: Alma Maria (died 2015)
- Children: 3
- Education: University of Urbino
- Profession: Journalist; politician

Arnaldo Forlani (Italian: [arˈnaldo forˈlaːni]; 8 December 1925 – 6 July 2023) was an Italian politician who served as Prime Minister of Italy from 1980 to 1981. He also held the office of Deputy Prime Minister of Italy, Minister of Foreign Affairs, and Minister of Defence. In 1981, together with Bettino Craxi and Giulio Andreotti, Forlani promoted the Pentapartito, the political coalition between the five major Italian parties that ruled Italy between 1981 and 1991. At the time of his death in 2023, he was both the oldest living and the longest-lived Italian prime minister.

A member of the right-wing faction of the Christian Democracy (DC) party, Forlani was one of the most prominent Italian politicians from the 1970s to early 1990s. He led the DC party on two occasions: between 1969 and 1973, and between 1989 and 1992. Forlani's permiership, which lasted less than a year, was strongly marked by the 1980 Irpinia earthquake and the Propaganda Due scandal, the latter causing his resignation in June 1981. His political career ended in the 1990s after the Tangentopoli scandal and a failed candidacy for president of the Italian Republic.

== Early life and career ==
Forlani was born on 8 December 1925, in Pesaro, Marche. As a youth, he played as a midfielder for Vis Pesaro in the Serie C of the Italian football league. In 1948, after getting a degree in law at the University of Urbino and being elected comunal and provincial councilor, Forlani began his political career, holding the position of provincial secretary of Christian Democracy (DC) for Pesaro.

In 1954, Forlani became a member of the central committee of Christian Democracy, as member of the right-wing faction. The following year, Forlani became director of the party's section Studi, Propaganda e Stampa. In the 1958 Italian general election, Forlani was elected in the Chamber of Deputies for the first time. Forlani soon became one of the closest collaborators of Amintore Fanfani, as an exponent of the Nuove Cronache DC current, of which Forlani became its number two in 1959. In 1962, he was elected national vice-secretary of Christian Democracy, under Aldo Moro's leadership. He held this position for seven years until 1969 under the secretariat of Mariano Rumor and Flaminio Piccoli.

== Secretary of Christian Democracy ==
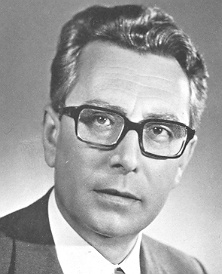
Forlani in 1972

In December 1968, Rumor became Prime Minister of Italy and appointed Forlani as Minister of Public Shares. In August 1969, he became Minister for the Relations with the United Nations in the second Rumor government. In September 1969, in San Ginesio he stipulated, together with Ciriaco de Mita, the "Pact of San Ginesio" to lead the DC, which materialised when two months later, on 9 November 1969, Forlani became secretary of the DC and De Mita, its vice-secretary. Forlani assumed the leadership of the party in a moment of social instability provoked by the mobilizations in the universities and factories, for which he drafted the Preambolo, to ask the Italian Socialist Party (PSI) to be part of a center-left government in order to break all relations with the Italian Communist Party (PCI) in the municipal administrations and the trade unions.

The DC's comfortable victory in the 1970 Italian regional elections, with 37% of the vote nationwide and victory in all regions except three, did not allow Forlani to achieve that DC's candidate for the 1971 Italian presidential election. His former mentor Fanfani gained enough confidence of the Chamber of Deputies. Forlani's second candidate was Aldo Moro, but this nomination was rejected by the Italian Parliament. At the end, the DC proposed Giovanni Leone, former prime minister and long-time president of the Chamber of Deputies, who was elected with the support of the neo-fascist Italian Social Movement.

In the 1972 Italian general election, which took place on 7 May, the advance of the right in the country was stopped, remaining stable with around 38% of the votes. Fanfani succeeded Forlani as secretary of the DC in the 1973 party congress. In 1976, Forlani tried to regain the party's secretariat as representative of the moderate internal current against the pacts with the PCI, but was defeated by Benigno Zaccagnini, who represented the more left-wing bloc.

== Member of the government ==
Between 1974 and 1976, Forlani was Minister of Defence. When the Italian Republican Party (PRI) left Moro's cabinet in 1976, no possibilities of a new government remained, and an early vote was called. After the election, which saw a great success of the PCI, Giulio Andreotti became the new prime minister and Forlani was appointed Minister of Foreign Affairs. The reasons of this important nomination were firstly the necessity to recover a climate of unity in the party after the congressional divisions and secondly the opportunity, in a world still marked by the Cold War, to allocate foreign policy to a clearly anti-communist personality, as Forlani was, able to calm the European and US partners. During his ministry, Forlani strongly supported the European integration process and the adhesion of Portugal to the European Economic Community.

== Prime Minister of Italy ==
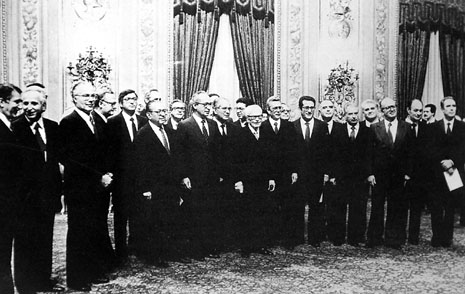
President Sandro Pertini with the Forlani Cabinet at the Quirinal Palace

In 1980, Forlani was among the main sponsor of Flaminio Piccoli in the party congress. Piccoli was elected secretary at the head of a centre-right majority. Due to his fundamental role in Piccoli's election, Forlani was appointed Prime Minister of Italy in October, leading a centrist and closer to centre-left coalition with PSI, PSDI and PRI.

=== 1980 Irpinia earthquake ===
During his premiership, Forlani had to face the Irpinia earthquake, a strong shock, that was centered on the village of Conza in Campania, and left at least 2,483 people dead, at least 7,700 injured, and left 250,000 homeless. Forlani's government spent 59 trillion lire on reconstruction, while other nations sent contributions. West Germany contributed 32 million United States dollars and the United States US$70 million.

In the early 1990s, a major corruption scandal emerged. Of the billions of lire that were predestined for aid to the victims and rebuilding, the largest part disappeared from the earthquake reconstruction funds in the 1980s. Of the $40 billion spent on earthquake reconstruction, an estimated $20 billion went to create an entirely new social class of millionaires in the region, $6.4 billion went to the Camorra, whereas another $4 billion went to politicians in bribes. Only the remaining $9.6 billion a quarter of the total amount, was actually spent on people's needs. Moreover, the Italian Mafia entered the construction industry after the quake.

=== P2 scandal and resignation ===
During his premiership, the list of who belonged to the secret lodge Propaganda Due (P2) was published. The P2 was a Masonic lodge founded in 1945 that by the time its Masonic charter was withdrawn in 1976, it had transformed into a clandestine, pseudo-Masonic, and far-right organisation, operating in contravention of Article 18 of the Constitution of Italy that banned secret societies. In its latter period, during which the lodge was headed by Licio Gelli, P2 was implicated in numerous Italian crimes and mysteries, including the collapse of the Vatican-affiliated Banco Ambrosiano, the murders of journalist Mino Pecorelli and banker Roberto Calvi, and corruption cases within the nationwide bribe scandal Tangentopoli. P2 came to light through the investigations into the collapse of Michele Sindona's financial empire.

P2 was sometimes referred to as a "state within a state", or a "shadow government". The lodge had among its members prominent journalists, members of Parliament, industrialists, and military leaders—including Silvio Berlusconi, who later became Prime Minister of Italy; the House of Savoy royal pretender to the Italian throne Victor Emmanuel, Prince of Naples; and the heads of all three Italian intelligence services (at the time SISDE, SISMI, and CESIS). When searching Gelli's villa in 1981, the police found a document called the "Plan for Democratic Rebirth", which called for a consolidation of the media, suppression of trade unions, and the rewriting of the Italian Constitution. The lateness with which they were published gained Forlani heavy criticism, in particular from the PCI. He was therefore compelled to resign from the position, staying away from the spotlight of politics for a certain period. With his resignation and the appointment of PRI leader Giovanni Spadolini, the unbroken line since 1945 of Christian Democrat prime ministers came to an end.

== After the premiership ==
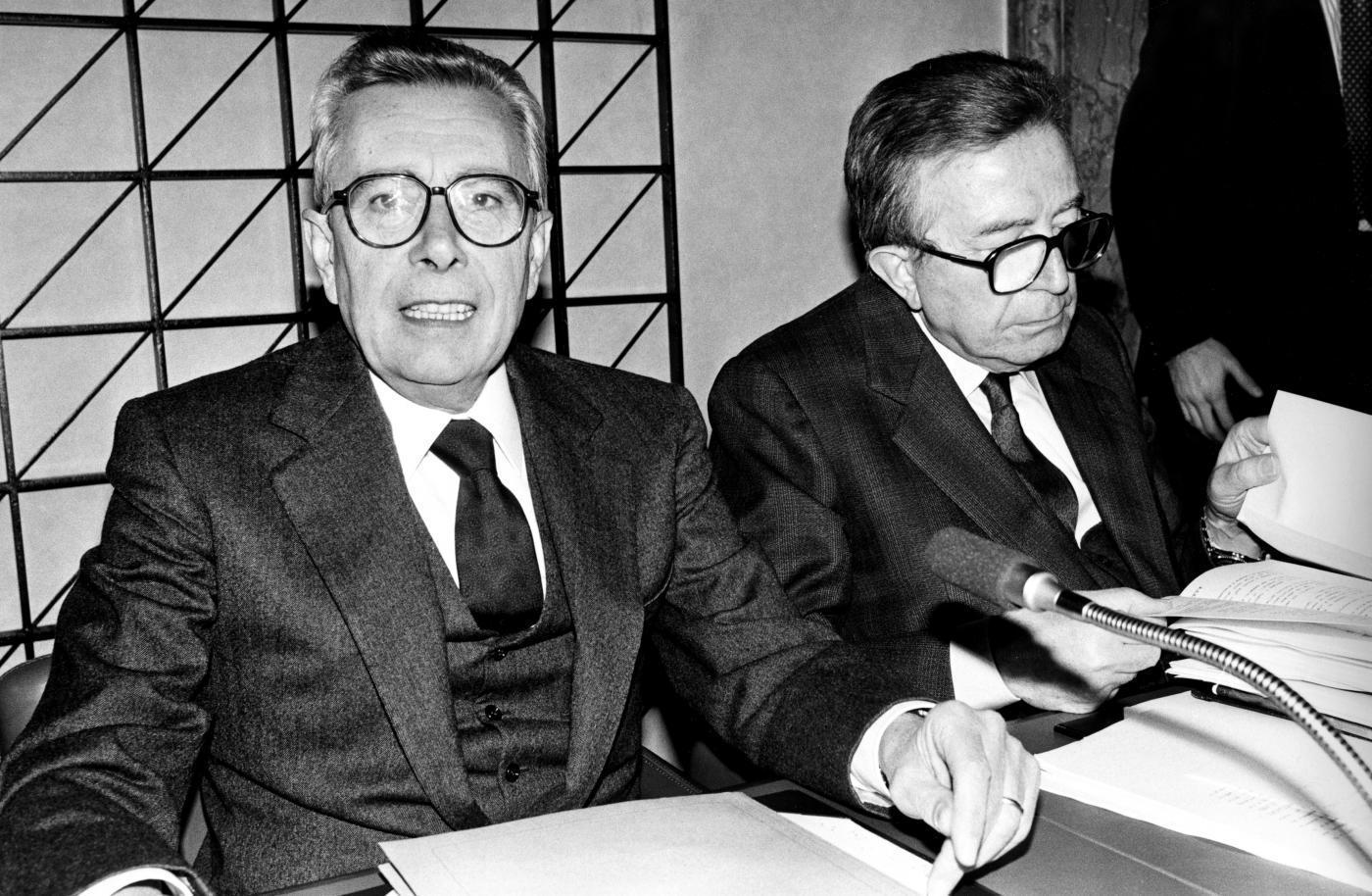
Forlani with Giulio Andreotti

At the PSI party congress in 1981, Forlani and PSI leader Bettino Craxi signed an agreement with the "blessing" of Andreotti, in which began the Pentapartito. In 1982, Forlani tried again to become DC secretary, but he was defeated by his former deputy secretary Ciriaco De Mita, who was now supported also by Fanfani. In 1983, Bettino Craxi was appointed Prime Minister by President Sandro Pertini and Forlani became Deputy Prime Minister of Italy.

== Second term as secretary ==
At the 18th party congress, Forlani was elected secretary of the DC for a second time, with 85% of votes. He managed as secretary the long government crisis that followed the 19 May 1989 resignation of De Mita as prime minister after strong contrasts with Craxi. In July, the sixth Andreotti government took office; after the good results of the DC in the 1989 European Parliament election in Italy, promoted the CAF political alliance, to shield the Pentapartito and whose initials correspond to the initials of Craxi, Andreotti and Forlani, which was the pivot of Italian politics for the remaining part of the legislature until the 1992 Italian general election. He was a member of the European Parliament in its third legislature from 1989 to 1994.

=== 1992 election and presidential ambitions ===
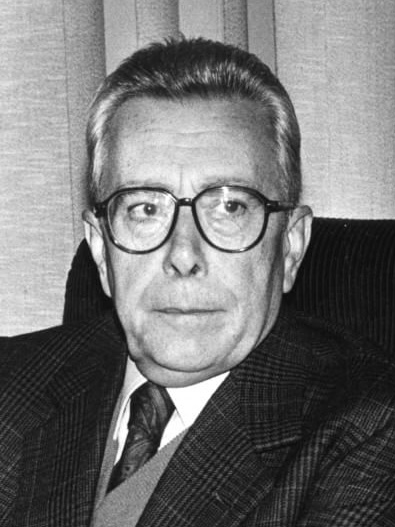
Forlani in 1992

At the end of 1991, Forlani convened the National Programmatic Conference of the DC in Milan in which he warned that the First Italian Republic was collapsing and identified the constructive vote of no confidence and an electoral reform of proportional representation towards a mixed electoral system with first-past-the-post as one of his main remedies. 1992 was revolutionised by the Mani pulite investigation, and in the 1992 Italian general election, held on 5 April, Christian Democracy suffered significant losses. In the 1992 Italian presidential election, the DC proposed Forlani as its candidate. During the 5th and 6th ballots, held on 16 May, Forlani missed the election by 39 and 29 votes respectively. Following these defeats, Forlani withdrew his candidacy as president of Italy.

=== Judicial case, resignation and decline ===
In 1992, Forlani was charged to two years and four months in prison for illicit financing for his involvement in the Tangentopoli scandal. His testimony ended up being remembered for his ruthless and uncooperative response to the prosecuting lawyer's questions during the hearings. The sentence was replaced with community service for Caritas in Rome. That conviction, added to the failed race for the presidency of the country and the bad results in the 1992 general election, put an end to his political career. Forlani resigned as DC secretary that same year. He did not stand for re-election as deputy in the 1994 Italian general election, ending an uninterrupted parliamentary career that began in 1958.

== Personal life and death ==
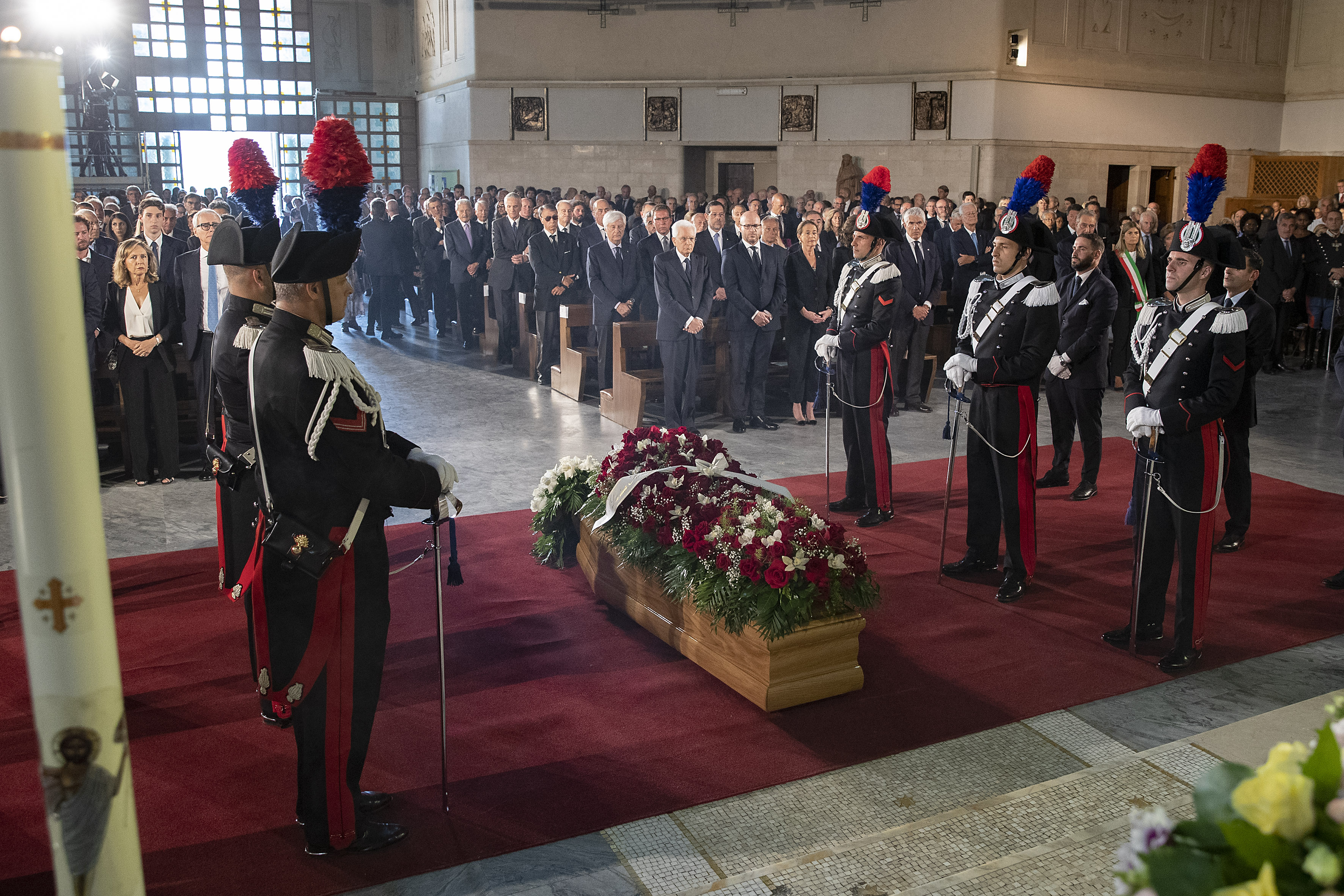
State funeral of Forlani on 10 July 2023

Forlani married Alma Maria, from whom he was widowed on 6 October 2015 when she died at the age of 86. They had three sons: Alessandro, Marco, and Luigi. Alessandro also had a stint in Italian politics, becoming a deputy and senator. Forlani died on 6 July 2023 in his house of Rome at the age of 97. The government declared a day of mourning on 10 July and, between 8 and 10 July, Flags were at half mast. The government also announced a state funeral that took place on 10 July in Rome's Santi Pietro e Paolo a Via Ostiense basilica.

== Electoral history ==
Election	House	Constituency	Party	Votes	Result
1958	Chamber of Deputies	Ancona–Pesaro–Macerata–Ascoli Piceno	DC	41,364	Elected
1963	Chamber of Deputies	Ancona–Pesaro–Macerata–Ascoli Piceno	DC	57,466	Elected
1968	Chamber of Deputies	Ancona–Pesaro–Macerata–Ascoli Piceno	DC	77,333	Elected
1972	Chamber of Deputies	Ancona–Pesaro–Macerata–Ascoli Piceno	DC	156,949	Elected
1976	Chamber of Deputies	Ancona–Pesaro–Macerata–Ascoli Piceno	DC	127,905	Elected
1979	Chamber of Deputies	Ancona–Pesaro–Macerata–Ascoli Piceno	DC	102,969	Elected
1983	Chamber of Deputies	Ancona–Pesaro–Macerata–Ascoli Piceno	DC	83,223	Elected
1987	Chamber of Deputies	Ancona–Pesaro–Macerata–Ascoli Piceno	DC	101,463	Elected
1992	Chamber of Deputies	Ancona–Pesaro–Macerata–Ascoli Piceno	DC	60,566	Elected

Political offices
Preceded by Giorgio Bo	Minister of State Holdings; 1968–1969	Succeeded by Franco Maria Malfatti
Preceded by Giulio Andreotti	Minister of Defence; 1974–1976	Succeeded by Vittorio Lattanzio
Preceded by Mariano Rumor	Minister of Foreign Affairs; 1976–1979	Succeeded by Franco Maria Malfatti
Preceded by Francesco Cossiga	Prime Minister of Italy; 1980–1981	Succeeded by Giovanni Spadolini
Vacant Title last held by Ugo La Malfa	Deputy Prime Minister of Italy; 1983–1987	Vacant Title next held by Giuliano Amato
Party political offices
Preceded by Flaminio Piccoli	Secretary of the Christian Democracy; 1969–1973	Succeeded by Amintore Fanfani
Preceded by Ciriaco De Mita	Secretary of the Christian Democracy; 1989–1992	Succeeded by Mino Martinazzoli
