= Ciriaco De Mita =

Italian politician (1928–2022)

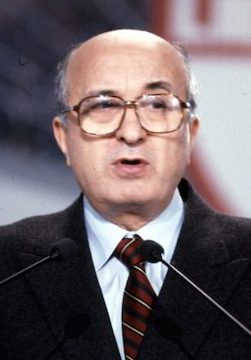

Prime Minister of Italy
- In office 13 April 1988 – 23 July 1989
- President: Francesco Cossiga
- Deputy: Gianni De Michelis
- Preceded by: Giovanni Goria
- Succeeded by: Giulio Andreotti

Minister for Interventions in Southern Italy
- In office 30 July 1976 – 21 March 1979
- Prime Minister: Giulio Andreotti
- Preceded by: Giulio Andreotti (by delegation of functions)
- Succeeded by: Michele Di Giesi

Minister of Foreign Trade
- In office 23 November 1974 – 30 July 1976
- Prime Minister: Aldo Moro
- Preceded by: Gianmatteo Matteotti
- Succeeded by: Rinaldo Ossola

Minister of Industry, Commerce, and Crafts
- In office 8 July 1973 – 23 November 1974
- Prime Minister: Mariano Rumor
- Preceded by: Mauro Ferri
- Succeeded by: Carlo Donat-Cattin

Secretary of Christian Democracy
- In office 5 May 1982 – 22 February 1989
- Preceded by: Flaminio Piccoli
- Succeeded by: Arnaldo Forlani

Member of the Chamber of Deputies
- In office 9 May 1996 – 28 April 2008
- Constituency: Campania
- In office 16 May 1963 – 14 April 1994
- Constituency: Benevento (1963–1987; 1992–1994); Liguria (1987–1992)

Member of the European Parliament
- In office 14 July 2009 – 1 July 2014
- In office 19 July 1999 – 19 July 2004
- In office 24 July 1984 – 13 April 1988
- Constituency: Southern Italy

Mayor of Nusco
- In office 26 May 2014 – 26 May 2022
- Preceded by: Giuseppe De Mita
- Succeeded by: Antonio Iuliano

Personal details
- Born: Luigi Ciriaco De Mita; 2 February 1928 Nusco, Italy
- Died: 26 May 2022 (aged 94) Avellino, Italy
- Party: DC (1956–1994); PPI (1994–2002); DL (2002–2007); PD (2007–2008); UDC (2008–2017); IP (2017–2022)
- Height: 1.78 m (5 ft 10 in)
- Spouse: Anna Maria Scarinzi (m. 1958)
- Children: 4
- Relatives: Giuseppe De Mita (nephew)
- Education: Catholic University of Milan

Luigi Ciriaco De Mita (Italian pronunciation: [luˈiːdʒi tʃiˈriːako de ˈmiːta]; 2 February 1928 – 26 May 2022) was an Italian politician and statesman who served as Prime Minister of Italy from April 1988 to July 1989. A member of Christian Democracy (DC), De Mita served as its secretary and leader from May 1982 until February 1989, becoming one of the most influential politicians in the country, as well as one of the most prominent members of DC's left-wing.

During his long-time career, De Mita served as Minister of Industry, Commerce, and Crafts from 1973 to 1974, Minister of Foreign Trade from 1974 to 1976, and Minister for Interventions in the South from 1976 until 1979. He was a member of the Chamber of Deputies for more than 40 years between 1963 and 2008 and also a member of the European Parliament. During his final years, De Mita served as mayor of his hometown Nusco from 2014 until his death in 2022.

== Early life ==
De Mita was born in Nusco, in the Avellinese hinterland of Campania, in 1928. His father was a tailor and postman, while his mother was a housewife. After attending the classical high school in nearby Sant'Angelo dei Lombardi with excellent grades, he won a scholarship in the Augustinianum College and enrolled at the Catholic University of the Sacred Heart in Milan, where he graduated in law and then started working as a consultant at Enrico Mattei's Eni legal office.

== Early political career ==
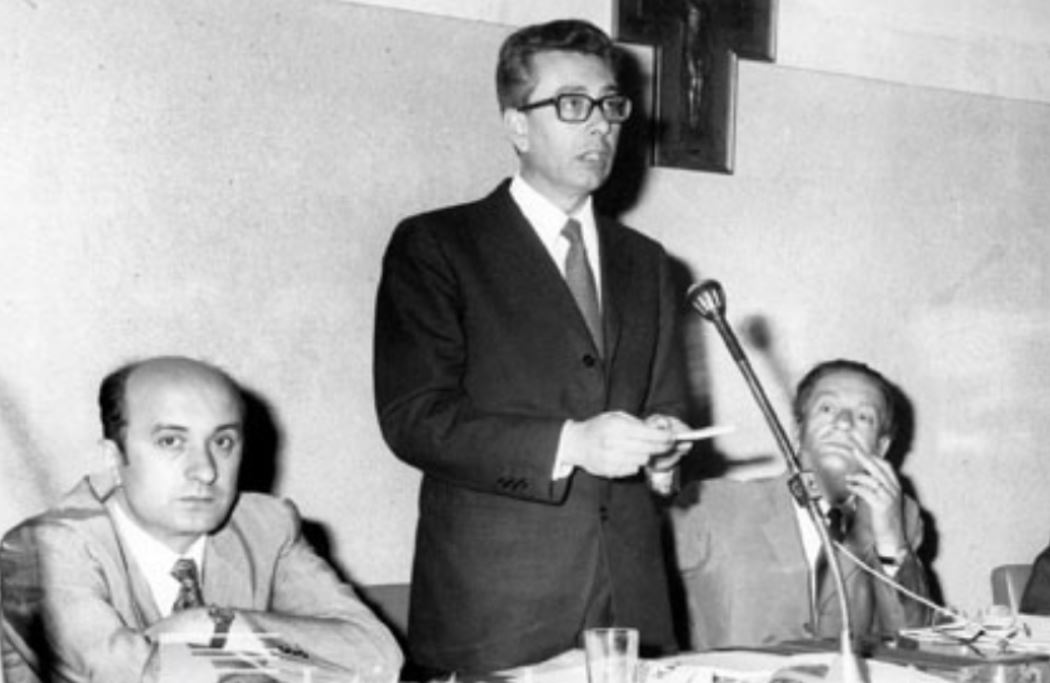
De Mita with Arnaldo Forlani and Benigno Zaccagnini in 1970

As a young man, De Mita joined the Christian Democracy (DC) party and entered politics. In 1953, De Mita was among the proponents of La Base, a leftist faction of the party, close to Giovanni Marcora. He rose through the ranks of the party, becoming a member of its national council in 1956 during the party's congress in Trento.

In the 1963 Italian general election, De Mita was elected to the Chamber of Deputies. Elected for the constituency of Benevento–Avellino–Salerno, he received more than 67,000 votes. He remained a deputy uninterruptedly until the 1994 Italian general election. In 1968, De Mita was appointed undersecretary of state to the Ministry of Interior, becoming a member of the government for the first time.

De Mita was appointed deputy secretary of the Christian Democracy in 1969, serving under the leadership of Arnaldo Forlani; he hold the position until February 1973. During the 1970s, De Mita hold various positions in the government. He served in the cabinet of Mariano Rumor as Minister of Industry, Trade, and Crafts from 8 July 1973 until 23 November 1974; Minister of Foreign Trade from 23 November 1974 to 30 July 1976 in the government of Aldo Moro and Minister for Extraordinary Interventions in Southern Italy in the cabinet of Giulio Andreotti from 30 July 1976 to 21 March 1979.

== Secretary of Christian Democracy ==
In the 1982 party congress, De Mita was elected secretary of the DC with a clear objective of renewing the party. As the party's leader, De Mita suffered a huge loss in the 1983 Italian general election. In 1986, De Mita was re-elected secretary with 60% support from the party. His secretariat is remembered for a rivalry with Bettino Craxi, socialist leader who in the 1980s held the office of Prime Minister for four years. Craxi had always promoted his reformist drive as opposed to the inaction of the DC, and in 1987 clashed with De Mita for the breaking of the "relay pact" (patto della staffetta), under which the Italian Socialist Party (PSI) would have had to cede the leadership of the government to the DC in the last year of the legislature. Craxi refused to do this, and in 1987 a snap election was called.

In 1984, De Mita pushed the future Italian president Sergio Mattarella and Leoluca Orlando to intensify their political commitment with the task of cleaning up the Sicilian branch of the DC from Sicilian Mafia control. De Mita appointed Mattarella as extraordinary commissioner for Palermo. De Mita remained secretary of the DC until 22 February 1989, when he became president of the party, a position he held until 1992.

== Prime Minister of Italy ==
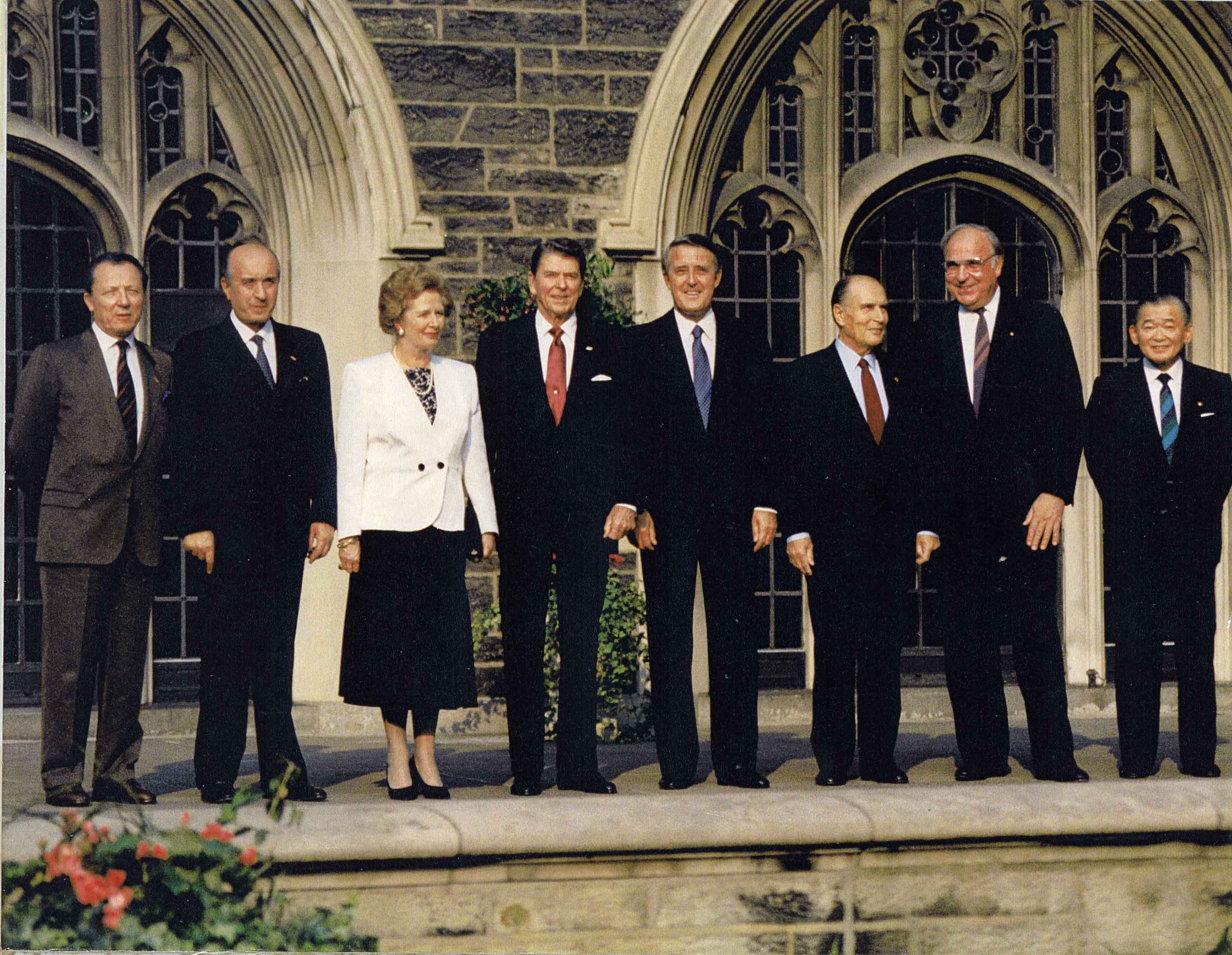
De Mita (second from left) in 14th G7 summit, 1988

After the elections of 1987, De Mita waited a year to become Prime Minister and was appointed on 13 April 1988, heading a five-way coalition (Pentapartito) with DC, PSI, PSDI, PRI and PLI. Three days later, on 16 April 1988, in Forlì, Red Brigades killed Senator Roberto Ruffilli, an advisor of De Mita. The De Mita government obtained a vote of confidence from the Chamber of Deputies on 21 April, government that had as its main objective the reform of the institutions based on four urgent points: the Italian Parliament, the presidency of the Council of Ministers, local entities and the rules of procedure of the Chamber of Deputies.

In June 1988, De Mita's cabinet approved the relocation of 72 U.S. Air Force F-16 fighters to Italy, in response to Spain's request to remove them from its territory. In social policy, De Mita's time in office witnessed the passage of a law in May 1988 that introduced a new benefit for salaried workers called "benefit for the family nucleus" (assegno per il nucleo familiare), with the amount varying depending on the number of family members and the family income of the previous year. After a government crisis caused by rivalry with Craxi, De Mita resigned on 19 May 1989. He was called to form a new coalition government, but did not succeed. His government finally fell in July 1989 and was succeeded by Giulio Andreotti on 23 July.

== Later political roles ==
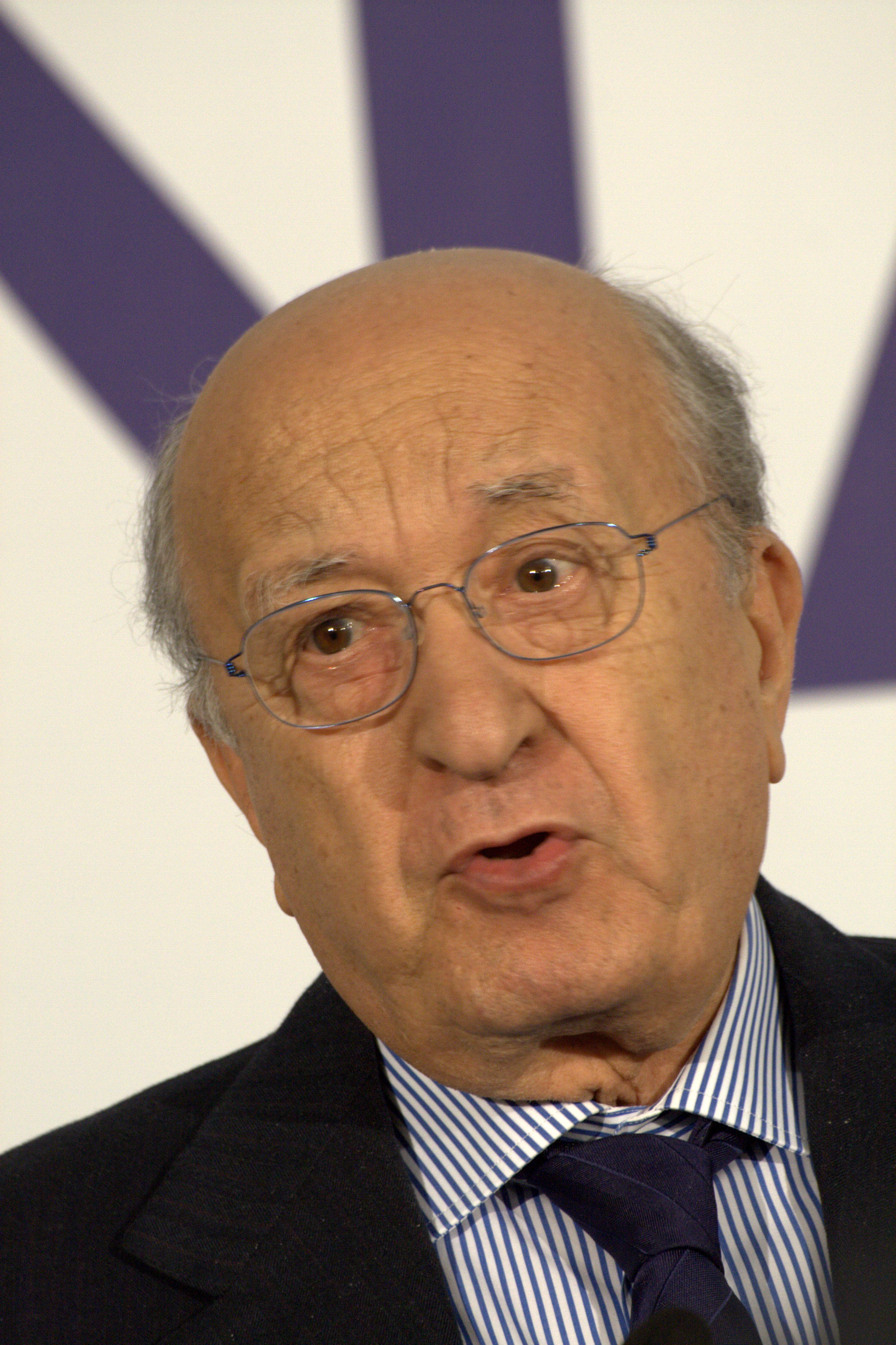
De Mita in 2010

In September 1992, De Mita was appointed chairman of the Bilateral Commission for Constitutional Reform, a position he left in March 1993 when was succeeded by Nilde Iotti. De Mita did not run for reelection as a deputy in 1994 but ran again in 1996 after a lag of two years and then re-elected in 2001 and 2006. He then joined the Italian People's Party and later Democracy is Freedom – The Daisy until 2008. De Mita was a member of the European Parliament between 1999 and 2004, and from 2009 to 2014. On 25 May 2014, De Mita was elected as mayor of Nusco, his native town, and re-elected in 2019, serving until his death in 2022.

== Personal life and death ==
In 1958, De Mita married Anna Maria Scarinzi (born 12 February 1939), with whom he had one son and three daughters, Antonia (born 23 December 1967), Giuseppe (born 10 May 1969), Floriana (born 19 March 1973), and Simona (born 21 April 1974). His nephew Giuseppe De Mita was member of the Chamber of Deputies between 2013 and 2018, and whose political career Ciriaco was in charge of catapulting. De Mita died on 26 May 2022, at the age of 94, while recovering from surgery for a fracture of a femur following a fall at home. His funeral was held the following day in Nusco.

== Electoral history ==
Election	House	Constituency	Party	Votes	Result
1958	Chamber of Deputies	Benevento–Avellino–Salerno	DC	39,431	Not elected
1963	Chamber of Deputies	Benevento–Avellino–Salerno	DC	67,450	Elected
1968	Chamber of Deputies	Benevento–Avellino–Salerno	DC	65,231	Elected
1972	Chamber of Deputies	Benevento–Avellino–Salerno	DC	127,876	Elected
1976	Chamber of Deputies	Benevento–Avellino–Salerno	DC	112,792	Elected
1979	Chamber of Deputies	Benevento–Avellino–Salerno	DC	169,431	Elected
1983	Chamber of Deputies	Benevento–Avellino–Salerno	DC	203,252	Elected
1984	European Parliament	Southern Italy	DC	1,055,233	Elected
1987	Chamber of Deputies	Genoa–Imperia–La Spezia–Savona	DC	84,726	Elected
1992	Chamber of Deputies	Benevento–Avellino–Salerno	DC	106,819	Elected
1996	Chamber of Deputies	Mirabella Eclano	PPI	33,326	Elected
1999	European Parliament	Southern Italy	PPI	105,288	Elected
2001	Chamber of Deputies	Mirabella Eclano	DL	37,504	Elected
2006	Chamber of Deputies	Campania 2	DL	– (Note: Elected in a closed list proportional representation system)	Elected
2008	Senate of the Republic	Campania	UDC	–	Not elected
2009	European Parliament	Southern Italy	UDC	56,967	Elected

Source: Ministry of the Interior

Political offices
Preceded by Mauro Ferri	Minister of Industry, Commerce, and Crafts; 1973–1974	Succeeded by Carlo Donat-Cattin
Preceded by Gianmatteo Matteotti	Minister of Foreign Trade; 1974–1976	Succeeded by Rinaldo Ossola
Preceded by Giulio Andreotti	Minister for Interventions in Southern Italy; 1976–1979	Succeeded by Michele Di Giesi
Preceded by Giovanni Goria	Prime Minister of Italy; 1988–1989	Succeeded by Giulio Andreotti
Party political offices
Preceded by Flaminio Piccoli	Secretary of Christian Democracy; 1982–1989	Succeeded by Arnaldo Forlani
