= Franco Maria Malfatti =

Italian politician (1927–1991)

Franco Maria Malfatti OMRI
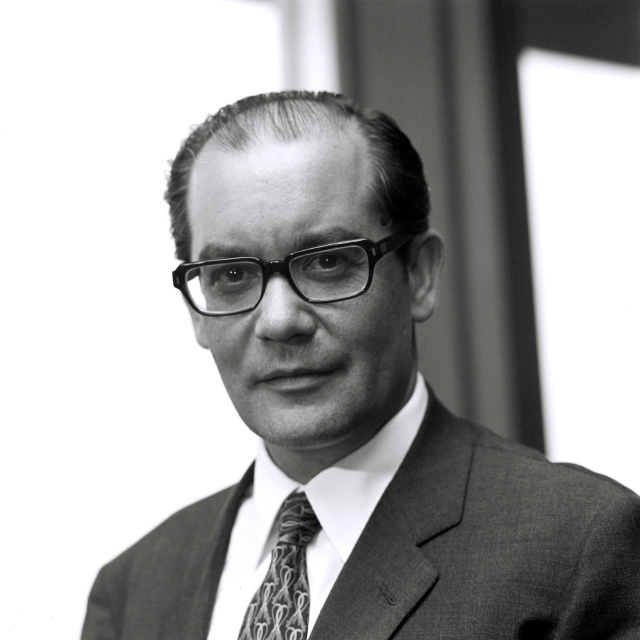
- Malfatti in 1972

President of the European Commission
- In office 1 July 1970 – 1 March 1972
- Vice President: Sicco Mansholt
- Preceded by: Jean Rey
- Succeeded by: Sicco Mansholt

Minister of Foreign Affairs
- In office 4 August 1979 – 15 January 1980
- Prime Minister: Francesco Cossiga
- Preceded by: Arnaldo Forlani
- Succeeded by: Attilio Ruffini

Minister of Finance
- In office 11 March 1978 – 4 August 1979
- Prime Minister: Giulio Andreotti
- Preceded by: Filippo Maria Pandolfi
- Succeeded by: Franco Reviglio

Minister of Education
- In office 7 July 1973 – 11 March 1978
- Prime Minister: Mariano Rumor; Aldo Moro; Giulio Andreotti
- Preceded by: Oscar Luigi Scalfaro
- Succeeded by: Mario Pedini

Minister of Post and Telecommunications
- In office 27 March 1970 – 9 June 1970
- Prime Minister: Mariano Rumor
- Preceded by: Athos Valsecchi
- Succeeded by: Giacinto Bosco

Minister of State Holdings
- In office 5 August 1969 – 27 March 1970
- Prime Minister: Mariano Rumor
- Preceded by: Arnaldo Forlani
- Succeeded by: Flaminio Piccoli

Personal details
- Born: 13 June 1927 Rome, Italy
- Died: 10 December 1991 (aged 64) Rome, Italy
- Resting place: Santa Croce, Florence, Italy
- Party: Christian Democracy
- Spouse: Franca Spinola
- Children: 2
- Education: University of Milan; University of Rome

Franco Maria Malfatti (Italian: [ˈfraŋko maˈriːa malˈfatti]; 13 June 1927 – 10 December 1991) was an Italian politician who served as the third president of the European Commission from 1970 to 1972. He served at the Italian level as Italian Minister of Foreign Affairs from 1979 to 1980 and Italian Minister of Education from 1973 to 1978.

== Biography ==
Malfatti was born in Rome to parents from the province of Rieti. He was an important member of the governing council of Democrazia Cristiana (the Christian Democratic party), where he became chief of the political bureau and covered several institutional charges.

In Democrazia Cristiana, he was a member of Dossetti's lobby, together with Amintore Fanfani, Aldo Moro, and Giorgio La Pira. In 1951 he was elected national representative for young members; in 1958 he was elected deputy for the districts of Rieti and Umbria. He served as minister for Foreign Affairs (1979–1980), Finance (1978–1979), Education, Industry, State holdings, and Telecommunications.

He was also the third President of the European Commission from 1970 to 1972. At 43 he was the youngest person to assume the office. The Malfatti Commission began as the integration process was relaunched: the EC adopted a financial framework and competed for the single market. There was also the beginnings of political cooperation, monetary cooperation, and of enlargement as talks opened with Denmark, Ireland, Norway and the United Kingdom. He resigned from this post in 1972 to run for office in Italy.

In the 1980s he was chief of the Italian delegation in the European Parliament. Politically close to Aldo Moro's lobby, Malfatti was among the participants in Bilderberg meetings.
