= List of secretaries of the Christian Democracy =

This is the list of national secretaries of Christian Democracy, a political party in Italy.

No.	Portrait	Name (Birth–Death)	Term of office	
1		Alcide De Gasperi (1881–1954)	July 1944	September 1946
2		Attilio Piccioni (1892–1976)	September 1946	January 1949
3		Giuseppe Cappi (1883–1963)	January 1949	June 1949
4		Paolo Emilio Taviani (1912–2001)	June 1949	April 1950
5		Guido Gonella (1905–1982)	April 1950	September 1953
(1)		Alcide De Gasperi (1881–1954)	April 1950	June 1954
6		Amintore Fanfani (1908–1999)	June 1954	March 1959
7		Aldo Moro (1916–1978)	March 1959	January 1964
8		Mariano Rumor (1915–1990)	January 1964	January 1969
9		Flaminio Piccoli (1915–2000)	January 1969	November 1969
10		Arnaldo Forlani (1925–2023)	November 1969	June 1973
(6)		Amintore Fanfani (1908–1999)	June 1973	July 1975
11		Benigno Zaccagnini (1912–1989)	July 1975	February 1980
(9)		Flaminio Piccoli (1915–2000)	February 1980	May 1982
12		Ciriaco De Mita (1928–2022)	May 1982	February 1989
(10)		Arnaldo Forlani (1925–2023)	February 1989	October 1992
13		Mino Martinazzoli (1931–2011)	October 1992	January 1994
