= Flaminio Piccoli =

Italian politician (1915–2000)

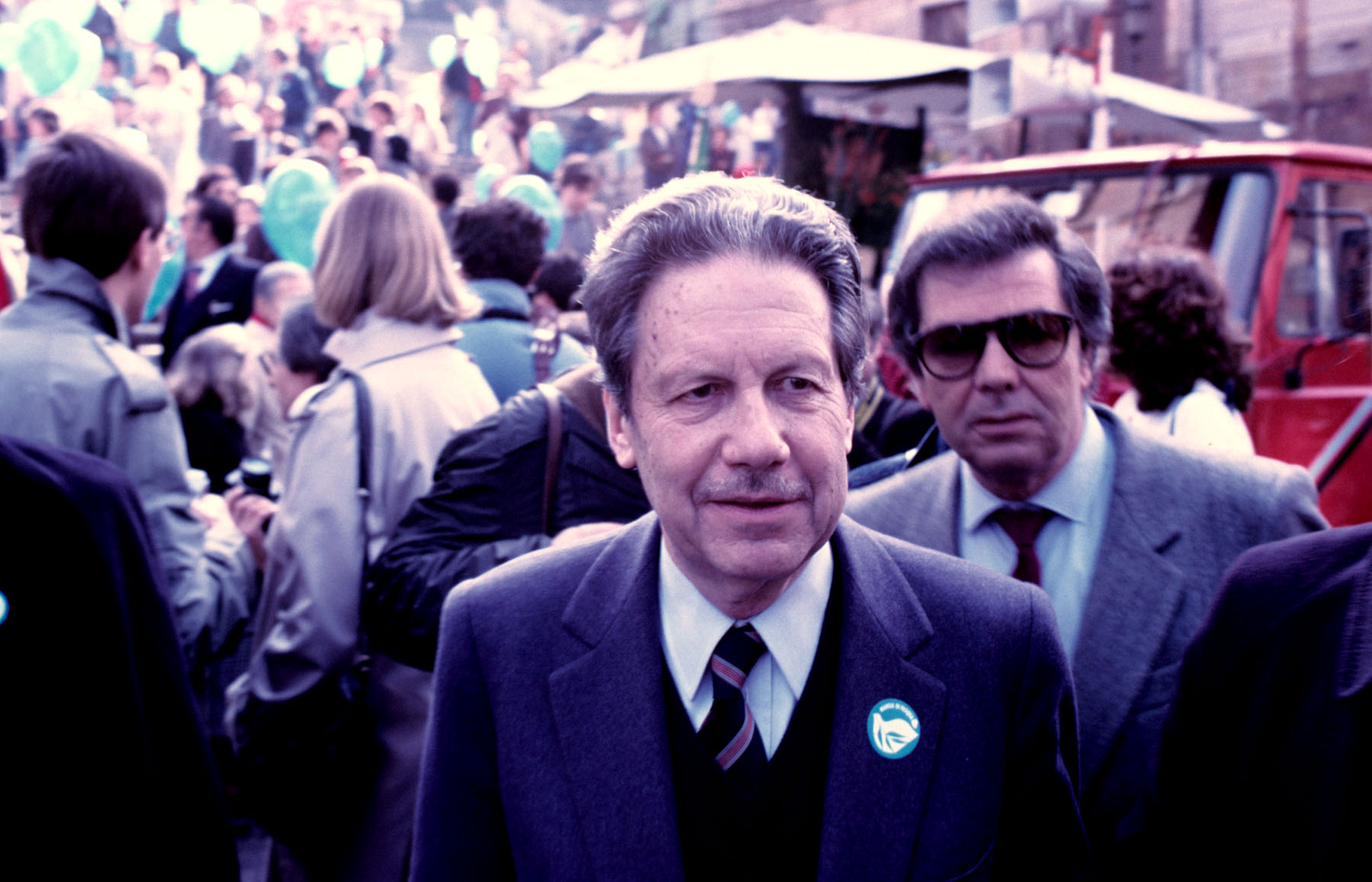
- Piccoli at the March for the Peace in Rome, 1985

Minister of Finance
- In office 27 March 1970 – 31 May 1972
- Preceded by: Franco Maria Malfatti
- Succeeded by: Mario Ferrari Aggradi

Secretary of Christian Democracy
- In office 1 February 1980 – 5 May 1982
- Preceded by: Benigno Zaccagnini
- Succeeded by: Ciriaco De Mita
- In office 19 January 1969 – 9 November 1969
- Preceded by: Mariano Rumor
- Succeeded by: Arnaldo Forlani
Parliamentary offices
Member of the Senate of the Republic
In office 23 April 1992 – 14 April 1994
Constituency	Campania
Member of the European Parliament
In office 17 July 1979 – 23 July 1984
Constituency	North-East Italy
Member of the Chamber of Deputies
In office 12 June 1958 – 22 April 1992
Constituency	Trento

Personal details
- Born: 28 December 1915 Kirchbichl, Austria
- Died: 11 April 2000 (aged 84) Rome, Italy
- Party: DC (1945–1994); CDU (1995–1997); RDC (1997–2000)
- Spouse: Pasqualina Reillo (m. 1953; div. 1959)
- Education: Ca' Foscari University of Venice
- Profession: Politician, journalist

Military service
- Allegiance: Kingdom of Italy
- Branch/service: Royal Italian Army
- Years of service: active: 1939–1945
- Rank: Officer
- Unit: Alpini
- Battles/wars: World War II; Italian Campaign

Flaminio Piccoli (28 December 1915 – 11 April 2000) was an Italian politician. He was a member of Christian Democracy until its dissolution in 1994, then a member of the United Christian Democrats and finally of the Rebirth of Christian Democracy.

== Biography ==
Piccoli was born in Kirchbichl, Austria, where his family had been deported during World War I. Son of Bennone, archivist in the Austrian administration, and Teresa Rigo, he was the last of four brothers (preceded by Ada, Nilo and Adone).

Returning to Trentino after the conflict, he studied in the schools of Trento. Subsequently, he enrolled at the Ca' Foscari University of Venice where he graduated in Foreign Languages and Literatures, presenting a thesis on Baudelaire's poetics. In these years he took part in the Catholic movement of Trentino, animated by the archbishop Celestino Endrici.

At the outbreak of the Second World War, he was sent to the front as captain of the Alpini. He was engaged in France, Albania, Montenegro, the Dauphiné; after 8 September 1943 he was taken prisoner and managed to escape from the German convoy which was to lead him to a concentration camp in Poland.

Actively participate in the Resistance and the Liberation War, representing Christian Democracy (DC). On 7 May 1945, he was in charge of relations with the press. In August 1945 he founded the local newspaper "Il Popolo Trentino", which in 1951 took the name of L'Adige, and was its editor in chief until 1977. Also during 1945 he married Maria Cescatti. After a long experience in journalism, he became general secretary of the International Federation of Catholic Journalists and for many years President of the Union of the Italian Catholic Press. He became president of the diocesan junta of the Trentino Catholic Action, called in 1952 by Archbishop Carlo De Ferrari. During this mandate Piccoli, together with Monsignor Alfonso Cesconi, claims the need for distinction between the religious and spiritual formation tasks of Catholic associations and the political and autonomous role of the party. This position also cost him an intervention by L'Osservatore Romano and his removal from the diocesan presidency of the Trentino Catholic association.

In 1957 he became provincial secretary of the Trentino Christian Democrats. In the 1958 elections he was elected for the first time to the Chamber of Deputies. He was continuously elected as deputy until 1992, when he was elected senator in the constituency of Castellammare di Stabia (NA).

Within the part he participated in the current of Democratic Initiative, which marked the transition from the degasperian generation to the so-called "second generation" and, subsequently, in the early 1960s, participated in the foundation of the "Dorotean faction". On 19 January 1969, Piccoli was elected national secretary of the party, a position he voluntarily left in the autumn of the same year following the division of the Dorotean faction into the factions "Popular Initiative" (the majority area that referred to Piccoli, Rumor and Bisaglia) and "Democratic Commitment" (which instead brought together the exponents who recognize themselves in Emilio Colombo and Giulio Andreotti). Arnaldo Forlani succeeded him in as secretary.

He served as Minister of State Holdings from 1970 to 1972, he was elected President of the Christian Democratic Parliamentary Group of the Chamber in the VI Legislature (25 May 1972 to 4 July 1976); subsequently it was the group leader of DC also in the VII Legislature (from 15 July 1976 to 2 October 1978). In 1978, after Aldo Moro's death, he replaced him as president of the national party council.

On 5 March 1980 he was re-elected national political secretary, a position he held until 1982, initiating a process of opening up Christian Democracy to the Catholic world leading to the National Assembly of "outsiders" and the direct involvement in politics of many intellectuals from the Catholic area. After the 1982 Congress in Rome, which elected Ciriaco De Mita as political secretary, he was again called to the presidency of the National Council, a position held until May 1986.

From 1986 to 1989 he held the position of President of the Christian Democratic International, and was elected President of the Foreign Commission of the Chamber. As president of the Foreign Commission, in April 1988 he made a trip to the Soviet Union, during which he pronounced some phrases related to the Italian expedition to Russia in the Second World War that aroused controversial reactions (especially by MP Mirko Tremaglia of the Italian Social Movement, also a member of the commission) and a debate in the Chamber. In particular, he said he was happy that Italy has lost the war because it has regained freedom and that those who started the war do not deserve Christian burial.

Following the mafia charges brought by the Palermo prosecutor against Giulio Andreotti, Piccoli intervened in his defense, stating that "whoever strikes Andreotti actually wants to weaken the role of Italy in Europe". At the end of a long judicial process, Andreotti's liability for events prior to 1980 will be recognized, for which he will however be acquitted by prescription; while for those after 1980 he will be acquitted for not having committed the fact.

Piccoli was against the dissolution of the Christian Democrats and didn't join the Italian People's Party upon its foundation in 1994.

In 1995 he approached the United Christian Democrats party (CDU), born from the initiative of Rocco Buttiglione. In 1997 he founded the movement for the Rebirth of Christian Democracy (RDC) with other former Christian Democrats, placing it in an alternative center position on the left. The movement did not have large memberships, but participated, also under different denominations, in some local administrative consultations.

He died in Rome on 11 April 2000 and was buried in the Monumental Cemetery of Trento.

== Electoral history ==
Election	House	Constituency	Party	Votes	Result
1958	Chamber of Deputies	Trento	DC	27,859	Elected
1963	Chamber of Deputies	Trento–Bolzano	DC	33,337	Elected
1968	Chamber of Deputies	Trento–Bolzano	DC	54,265	Elected
1972	Chamber of Deputies	Trento–Bolzano	DC	84,378	Elected
1976	Chamber of Deputies	Trento–Bolzano	DC	37,402	Elected
1979	Chamber of Deputies	Trento–Bolzano	DC	41,800	Elected
1979	European Parliament	North-East Italy	DC	268,808	Elected
1983	Chamber of Deputies	Trento–Bolzano	DC	39,852	Elected
1987	Chamber of Deputies	Trento–Bolzano	DC	33,309	Elected
1992	Senate of the Republic	Campania – Castellammare di Stabia	DC	49,172	Elected
