= Christian Democracy Youth Movement =

Youth wing of Italian Christian Democratic party

Christian Democracy Youth Movement Movimento Giovanile della Democrazia Cristiana
- Founded: 1944
- Dissolved: 1993
- Ideology: Christian democracy Popularism
- Mother party: Christian Democracy

The Christian Democracy Youth Movement (Italian: Movimento Giovanile della Democrazia Cristiana) was the youth wing of the Christian Democracy.

== History ==
It was founded in 1944 and its first secretary ("delegate of the Youth Movement") was Giulio Andreotti.

The first congress was held in January 1947 in Assisi where Andreotti was confirmed. In 1951 the V Congress of the Youth Movement was won by the Dossetti'a faction.

The last secretary was Francesco Sanna, elected in the eighteenth and last national congress, which took place in Montecatini, between 17 and 20 December 1992.

At the National Constituent Assembly of Rome in July 1993, the Youth Movement of DC was renamed Young Populars (Italian: Giovani Popolari).
