= 1970 Marche regional election =

← 1965	7–8 June 1970	1975 →

All 31 seats to the Legislative Assembly of Marche
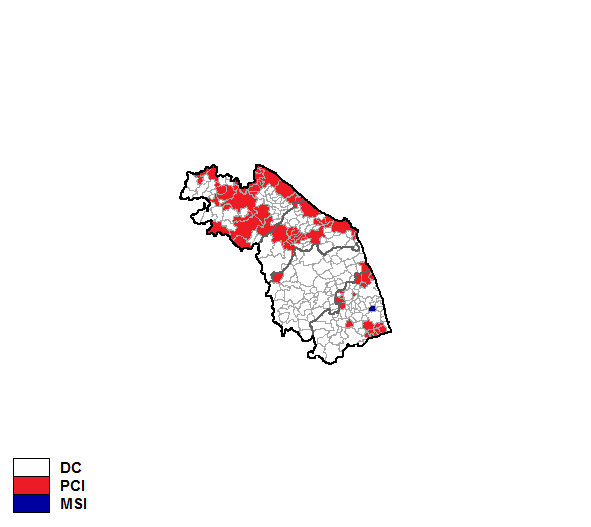
- Largest party by municipality.
President of Marche
Giuseppe Serrini
Christian Democracy

The Marche regional election of 1970 took place on 7–8 June 1970.

== Events ==
Christian Democracy was the largest party. After the election, Christian Democrat Giuseppe Serrini formed a government including also the Italian Socialist Party, the Unitary Socialist Party and the Italian Republican Party (organic Centre-left). Dino Tiberi took over from Serrini in 1972.

== Results ==
Parties	votes	votes (%)	seats
Christian Democracy	333,383	38.6	17
Italian Communist Party	274,915	31.8	14
Italian Socialist Party	72,886	8.4	3
Unitary Socialist Party	54,342	6.3	2
Italian Republican Party	36,078	4.2	1
Italian Social Movement	34,549	4.0	1
Italian Socialist Party of Proletarian Unity	33,654	3.9	1
Italian Liberal Party	23,591	2.7	1
Italian Democratic Party of Monarchist Unity	1,172	0.1	-
Total	864,570	100.0	40

Source: Ministry of the Interior
