= Mariano Rumor =

Italian politician and statesman (1915–1990)

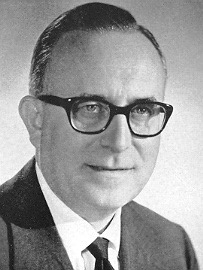

Prime Minister of Italy
- In office 8 July 1973 – 23 November 1974
- President: Giovanni Leone
- Preceded by: Giulio Andreotti
- Succeeded by: Aldo Moro
- In office 13 December 1968 – 6 August 1970
- President: Giuseppe Saragat
- Deputy: Francesco De Martino; Paolo Emilio Taviani
- Preceded by: Giovanni Leone
- Succeeded by: Emilio Colombo

Secretary of Christian Democracy
- In office 27 January 1964 – 19 January 1969
- Preceded by: Aldo Moro
- Succeeded by: Flaminio Piccoli
Ministerial offices
Minister of Foreign Affairs
In office 23 November 1974 – 29 July 1976
Prime Minister	Aldo Moro
Preceded by	Aldo Moro
Succeeded by	Arnaldo Forlani
Minister of the Interior
In office 17 February 1972 – 8 July 1973
Prime Minister	Giulio Andreotti
Preceded by	Franco Restivo
Succeeded by	Paolo Emilio Taviani
In office 21 June 1963 – 4 December 1963
Prime Minister	Giovanni Leone
Preceded by	Paolo Emilio Taviani
Succeeded by	Paolo Emilio Taviani
Minister of Agriculture
In office 15 February 1959 – 21 June 1963
Prime Minister	Antonio Segni; Fernando Tambroni; Amintore Fanfani
Preceded by	Mario Ferrari Aggradi
Succeeded by	Bernardo Mattarella
Secretary of the Council of Ministers
In office 18 January 1954 – 10 February 1954
Prime Minister	Amintore Fanfani
Preceded by	Giulio Andreotti
Succeeded by	Oscar Luigi Scalfaro
Parliamentary offices
Member of the Senate of the Republic
In office 20 June 1979 – 22 January 1990
Constituency	Vicenza
Member of the European Parliament
In office 17 July 1979 – 23 July 1984
Constituency	North-East Italy
Member of the Chamber of Deputies
In office 8 May 1948 – 19 June 1979
Constituency	Verona
Member of the Constituent Assembly
In office 25 June 1946 – 31 January 1948
Constituency	Verona

Personal details
- Born: 16 June 1915 Vicenza, Kingdom of Italy
- Died: 22 January 1990 (aged 74) Vicenza, Italy
- Party: DC (1943–1990)
- Education: University of Padua

Mariano Rumor (Italian pronunciation: [maˈrjaːno ruˈmor];16 June 1915 – 22 January 1990) was an Italian politician and statesman. A member of the Christian Democracy (DC), he served as the 39th prime minister of Italy from December 1968 to August 1970 and again from July 1973 to November 1974. As prime minister, he led five different governments, supported by various coalitions.

Rumor served as Italian Minister of Agriculture from 1959 to 1963, Italian Minister of Foreign Affairs from 1974 to 1976, and Italian Minister of the Interior in two brief periods, in 1963 and from 1972 to 1973. Rumor was the secretary of the DC from 1964 to 1969.

== Early life and career ==
Mariano Rumor was born in Vicenza, Veneto, on 16 June 1915. His father, Giuseppe Rumor, was the owner of a printing studio and promoter of a local magazine, The Catholic Worker, founded by Rumor's grandfather. His mother, Tina Nardi, came from a liberal family. He attended the classical lyceum Antonio Pigafetta in Vicenza, then he earned a degree from the University of Padua in literature in 1939.

After his graduation, Rumor became a teacher at an Italian lyceum until his mobilization as a lieutenant in the Italian Army during the Second World War. Subsequent to the Armistice of Cassibile in 1943 between Italy and the Allied powers, Rumor joined the Italian resistance movement. After the end of the war, he was among the founders of the Christian Associations of Italian Workers (ACLI), the widespread lay Catholic associations, and joined the Christian Democracy (DC) party, of which he became one of the main leaders in Veneto, very close to Prime Minister Alcide De Gasperi. In the 1946 Italian general election, Rumor was elected with more than 29,000 votes to the Constituent Assembly, for the constituency of Verona–Padova–Vicenza–Rovigo.

He became a member of the new-born Chamber of Deputies in 1948. The 1948 Italian general election was heavily influenced by the Cold War confrontation between the Soviet Union and the United States, and is best known for the covert political warfare waged by the US State Department and Central Intelligence Agency on behalf of the DC. The elections were eventually won with a comfortable margin by De Gasperi's DC that defeated the left-wing coalition of the Popular Democratic Front, which comprised the Italian Communist Party (PCI) and the Italian Socialist Party (PSI). As a deputy, he became very close to Giuseppe Dossetti, becoming a member of his Christian leftist wing.

== Political career ==
=== First roles in government ===
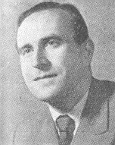
Rumor in 1953

In 1950, Guido Gonella succeeded Paolo Emilio Taviani as National Secretary of the DC; the target of the new secretariat was to build a unitary management of the party in support of the government led by Alcide De Gasperi. In this context, Rumor was nominated for the first time as National Deputy Secretary, together with Dossetti.

The withdrawal from politics of Giuseppe Dossetti, left his faction without a charismatic leader; however, Mariano Rumor played a decisive role in the birth of the new faction, called "Democratic Initiative", which brought together not only Dossetti's followers, such as Giorgio La Pira, Amintore Fanfani and Aldo Moro, but also members of the centrist pro-De Gasperi majority, as Paolo Emilio Taviani and Oscar Luigi Scalfaro. Rumor himself presented the manifesto of Democratic Initiative, published on a magazine with the same name. In this text, alongside the declaration of support for De Gasperi and the Atlantic Pact, Dossetti's principles of a Christian reformist party were reaffirmed, with the aim of moving the country towards a "democratic evolution".

Rumor immediately played a leading role in the faction. This position, led him to hold the first government posts, becoming Undersecretary for Agriculture in De Gasperi's seventh government, a position he also maintained in De Gasperi VIII Cabinet and, after De Gasperi's retirement in 1954, in the short-lived government led by Giuseppe Pella. In the brief first Fanfani government, from January to February 1954, Rumor was appointed to Secretary of the Council of Ministers.

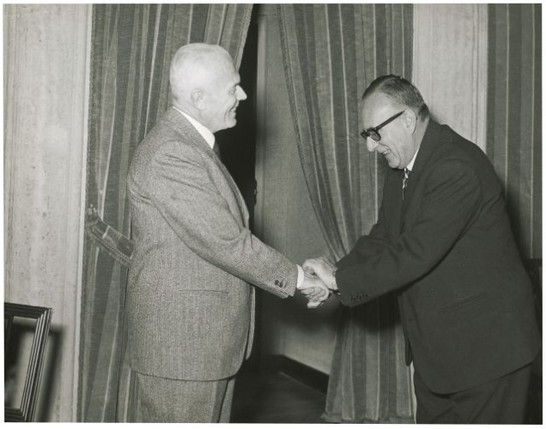
Rumor with Sandro Pertini

In 1954, after the National Congress of Naples, which saw the affirmation of Democratic Initiative and the subsequent election of Fanfani as party's Secretary, Rumor was elected again deputy secretary. He held this office for the next five years, until Democratic Initiative split up. In fact, many members of the faction, started criticizing the political line of Fanfani's secretariat, who cautiously began to open to the prospect of a collaboration with Italian Socialist Party (PSI). Prominent members of the faction, including Rumor himself, put the Secretary in minority during the National Congress of March 1959. In this way, Democratic Initiative split up between the followers of Fanfani and the dissident group, now renamed by all Dorotei ("Dorotheans"), from the place where they had gathered before the congress, the convent of the sisters of Santa Dorotea in Rome. The new faction was built around Antonio Segni, Mariano Rumor and Aldo Moro, who was elected new Secretary.

In the same year, as one of the faction's leaders, Rumor was appointed Minister of Agriculture, in the second Segni's government, a position he would keep in the governments of Fernando Tambroni, and Fanfani. In this role, Rumor contributed to the definition of one of the first plans for the development and innovation of the national agricultural sector, the so-called "Green Plan".

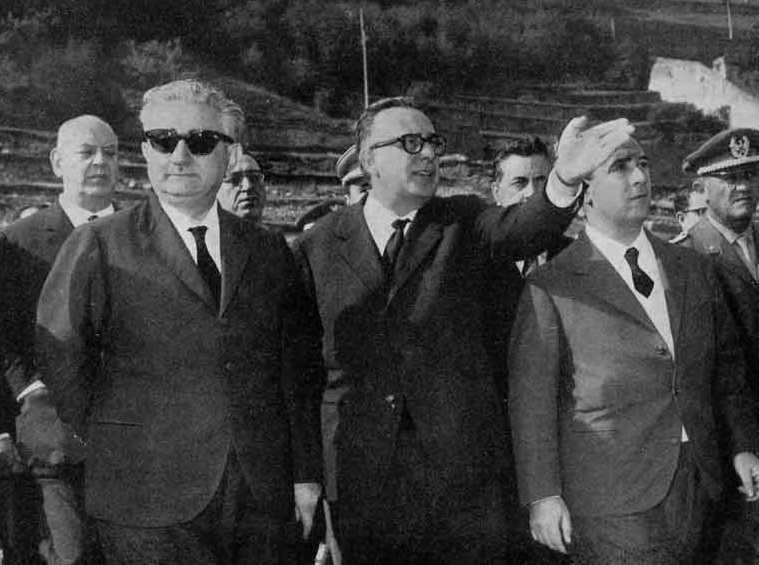
Rumor and Giovanni Leone visiting the site of the Vajont Dam disaster

In 1963 Italian general election, the DC suffered a sharp decline of consensus. Rumor was appointed Minister of the Interior in the short-lived government chaired by Giovanni Leone. As minister, he had to face one of the most tragic events in Italian republican history, the Vajont Dam disaster. On 9 October 1963, a landslide occurred on Monte Toc, in the province of Pordenone. The landslide caused a megatsunami in the artificial lake in which 50 million cubic metres of water overtopped the dam in a wave of 250 metres (820 ft), leading to the complete destruction of several villages and towns, and 1,917 deaths. In the previous months, the Adriatic Society of Electricity (SADE) and the Italian government, which both owned the dam, dismissed evidence and concealed reports describing the geological instability of Monte Toc on the southern side of the basin and other early warning signs reported prior to the disaster.

Immediately after the disaster, government and local authorities insisted on attributing the tragedy to an unexpected and unavoidable natural event. However, numerous warnings, signs of danger, and negative appraisals had been disregarded in the previous months and the eventual attempt to safely control the landslide into the lake by lowering its level came when the landslide was almost imminent and was too late to prevent it. The communist newspaper L'Unità was the first to denounce the actions of management and government.

=== Secretary of Christian Democracy ===
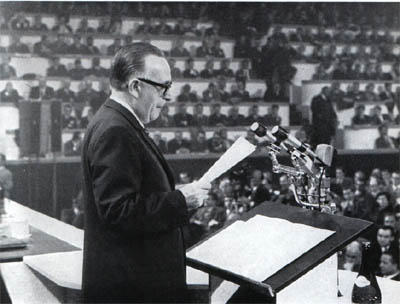
Rumor during the 1967 DC congress

In January 1964, Rumor was elected the DC secretary, holding the office until January 1969 and leading the party in a complex phase of government cooperation with the socialists. In the five years leading the DC, Rumor tried to reassure the moderate electorate in an attempt to recover the consensus lost in the previous elections.

Rumor embodied the typical characteristics of the Dorotheans: caution, moderation, the propensity for mediation rather than for decision, attention to practical and concrete topics, rather than to major strategies, the representation of the interests of the provincial middle class, the privileged link with the public administration, with the Catholic world and with direct farmers. In the 1968 Italian general election, the DC managed to increase its votes, albeit slightly, gaining 39% of votes. This result was experienced as a success by the Rumor secretariat and he became a natural candidate for the leadership of the government.

=== First term as prime minister ===
On 13 December 1968, Mariano Rumor was sworn in as prime minister for the first time, leading a government composed of Christian Democrats, Socialists and Republicans. During his first term as prime minister, a number of progressive reforms were carried out.

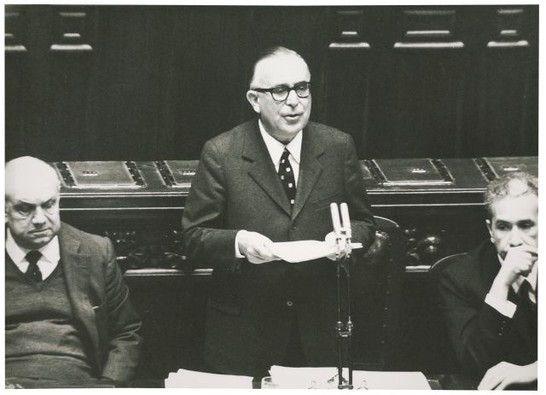
Rumor speaking to the Chamber of Deputies in 1970

In foreign policy, Rumor signed on 28 January 1969 the Nuclear Non-Proliferation Treaty; however, his first term as prime minister was deeply marked by the Piazza Fontana massacre, a terrorist attack that occurred on 12 December 1969 when a bomb exploded at the headquarters of National Agrarian Bank in Piazza Fontana, Milan, killing 17 people and wounding 88. In the same afternoon, three more bombs were detonated in Rome and Milan, and another was found unexploded. The attack was planned by a neo-fascist group, Ordine Nuovo (New Order), whose aim was to prevent the country falling into the hands of the left-wing by duping the public into believing the bombings were part of a communist insurgency.

During his first term, Rumor led three different governments. From December 1968 to July 1969, the DC joined with the Italian Socialist Party (PSI) as well as the Italian Republican Party (PRI). From August 1969 to February 1970 he led a DC-only government; its collapse led to a 45-day long period without government, with issues such as Italian divorce law and the status of the Italian Communist Party (PCI) generating instability. After this period, which included an attempt by former Prime Minister Amintore Fanfani to form a government, Rumor led a new coalition with the Socialist, Republican, and Democratic Socialist parties from March until July 1970.

=== Interior Minister and assassination attempt ===
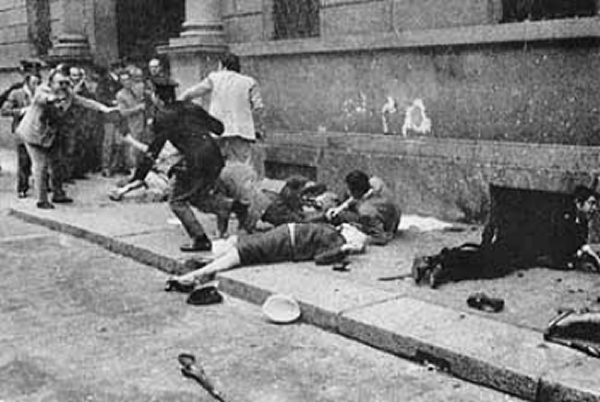
An image of the 1973 Milan massacre, of which Rumor was considered the main target

In 1972, Rumor was appointed Minister of the Interior, in the government of Giulio Andreotti. In 1973, Rumor was the target of an assassination attempt, planned by Gianfranco Bertoli, a self-described anarchist. Four were killed during the bombing, and 45 injured, while Rumor escaped alive from it. Bertoli was given a life-term in 1975. Bertoli was an informant of SISMI, the "Military Intelligence and Security Service", at the time. Court proceedings later showed that this connection was one of mistaken identity.

=== Second term as prime minister ===
After three years under Emilio Colombo and Giulio Andreotti's ministries, Rumor returned to the office of Prime Minister, first leading a coalition composed of Christian Democrats, Socialists, Republicans, and Democratic Socialists from July 1973 to March 1974. After this government collapsed, Rumor formed a new coalition within two weeks, calling upon the Socialists and Democratic Socialists to join with DC from March until October 1974. Weathering a cabinet resignation in June 1974, Rumor's final cabinet would fall in October 1974 after failing to come to an agreement on how to deal with rising economic inflation.

=== After the premiership ===
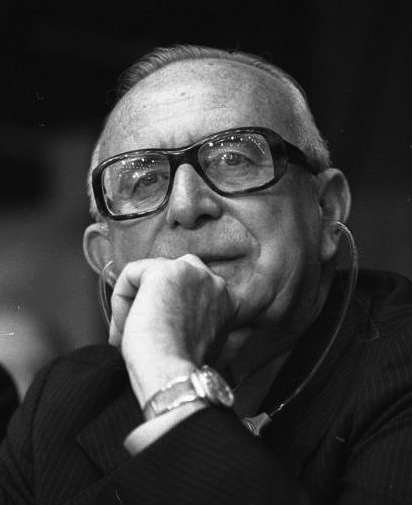
Rumor in 1978

In November 1974, Rumor was appointed Minister of Foreign Affairs in Aldo Moro's fourth cabinet. During his ministry, he signed the Osimo Treaty with Yugoslavia, defining the official partition of the Free Territory of Trieste. The port city of Trieste with a narrow coastal strip to the north west (Zone A) was given to Italy; a portion of the north-western part of the Istrian peninsula (Zone B) was given to Yugoslavia.

The Italian government was harshly criticized for signing the treaty, particularly for the secretive way in which negotiations were carried out, skipping the traditional diplomatic channels. Italian nationalists of the MSI rejected the idea of giving up Istria, since Istria had been an ancient "Italian" region together with the Venetian region (Venetia et Histria). Furthermore, Istria had belonged to Italy for 25 years between World War I and the end of World War II, and the west coast of Istria had long had a sizeable Italian minority population.

Some nationalist politicians called for the prosecution of Prime Minister Moro and Minister Rumor, for the crime of treason, as stated in Article 241 of the Italian Criminal Code, which mandated a life sentence for anybody found guilty of aiding and abetting a foreign power to exert its sovereignty on the national territory. The defeat in the 1975 Italian regional elections led to the removal of Amintore Fanfani from the party secretariat. Rumor was proposed by Moro as the new party secretary, but he was vetoed by some members of his own faction. Due to this veto, Rumor abandoned the Dorotheans, approaching the positions of the new secretary Benigno Zaccagnini. Following the Dorotheans' split, Rumor was slowly excluded from relevant positions in the party and in the government. In 1979, Rumor was elected in the European Parliament, where he later became Chair of the Political Affairs Committee in 1980, serving in that post until he left the European Parliament in 1984.

== Death and legacy ==
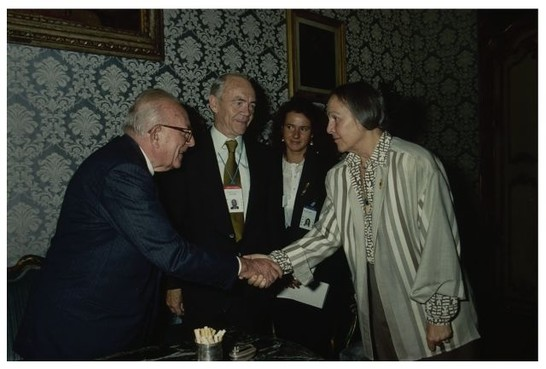
Rumor with the president of the Chamber Nilde Iotti in 1989

Rumor died of a heart attack in Vicenza on 22 January 1990 at the age of 74. In the years since his death, Rumor's legacy has been widely debated. The Lockheed bribery scandals, of which Rumor was exonerated by the Italian Parliament, took place under his government and culminated in the trials of two former Defense ministers, Luigi Gui and Mario Tanassi. Rumor was implicated in the scandal after a Lockheed codebook referenced "Antelope Cobbler" as "Prime Minister", which could have been any of Rumor, Aldo Moro, or then-President Giovanni Leone during the relevant time period. While Leone later resigned from the Presidency due to accusations of corruption, none of the three men were ever convicted of being "Antelope Cobbler".

Others have criticized his Presidential Decree No. 1092, a measure which allowed Italian governmental workers to retire after nineteen and a half years of work or fourteen and a half years if they were a woman; such retirees were later termed "baby pensioners" by detractors. The program, instituted in 1973, was terminated in 1992. As of 2014 it was estimated that around half a million pensioners who benefited from the decree were still drawing an average of €1,500 per month.

== Personal life ==
Rumor never married. During all his lifetime and even after his death, speculations arose around his possible homosexuality; however, Rumor had always denied these speculations, which would have ruined his career in a social conservative party like the DC.

== Electoral history ==
Election	House	Constituency	Party	Votes	Result
1946	Constituent Assembly	Verona	DC	29,213	Elected
1948	Chamber of Deputies	Verona	DC	43,002	Elected
1953	Chamber of Deputies	Verona	DC	49,576	Elected
1958	Chamber of Deputies	Verona	DC	61,492	Elected
1963	Chamber of Deputies	Verona	DC	93,735	Elected
1968	Chamber of Deputies	Verona	DC	168,828	Elected
1972	Chamber of Deputies	Verona	DC	266,710	Elected
1976	Chamber of Deputies	Verona	DC	73,729	Elected
1979	Senate of the Republic	Vicenza	DC	88,028	Elected
1979	European Parliament	North-East Italy	DC	235,478	Elected
1983	Senate of the Republic	Vicenza	DC	73,372	Elected
1987	Senate of the Republic	Vicenza	DC	81,348	Elected

Political offices
Preceded by Giulio Andreotti	Secretary of the Council of Ministers; 1954	Succeeded by Oscar Luigi Scalfaro
Preceded by Mario Ferrari Aggradi	Minister of Agriculture; 1959–1963	Succeeded by Bernardo Mattarella
Preceded by Paolo Emilio Taviani	Minister of the Interior; 1963	Succeeded by Paolo Emilio Taviani
Preceded by Giovanni Leone	Prime Minister of Italy; 1968–1970	Succeeded by Emilio Colombo
Preceded by Franco Restivo	Minister of the Interior; 1972–1973	Succeeded by Paolo Emilio Taviani
Preceded by Giulio Andreotti	Prime Minister of Italy; 1973–1974	Succeeded by Aldo Moro
Preceded by Aldo Moro	Minister of Foreign Affairs; 1974–1976	Succeeded by Arnaldo Forlani
Party political offices
Preceded by Aldo Moro	Secretary of Christian Democracy; 1964–1969	Succeeded by Flaminio Piccoli
