= 1970 Italian regional elections =

- 7–8 June 1970

Regional assemblies of Piedmont, Lombardy, Veneto, Liguria, Emilia-Romagna, Tuscany, Marche, Umbria, Lazio, Campania, Molise, Abruzzo, Apulia, Basilicata and Calabria
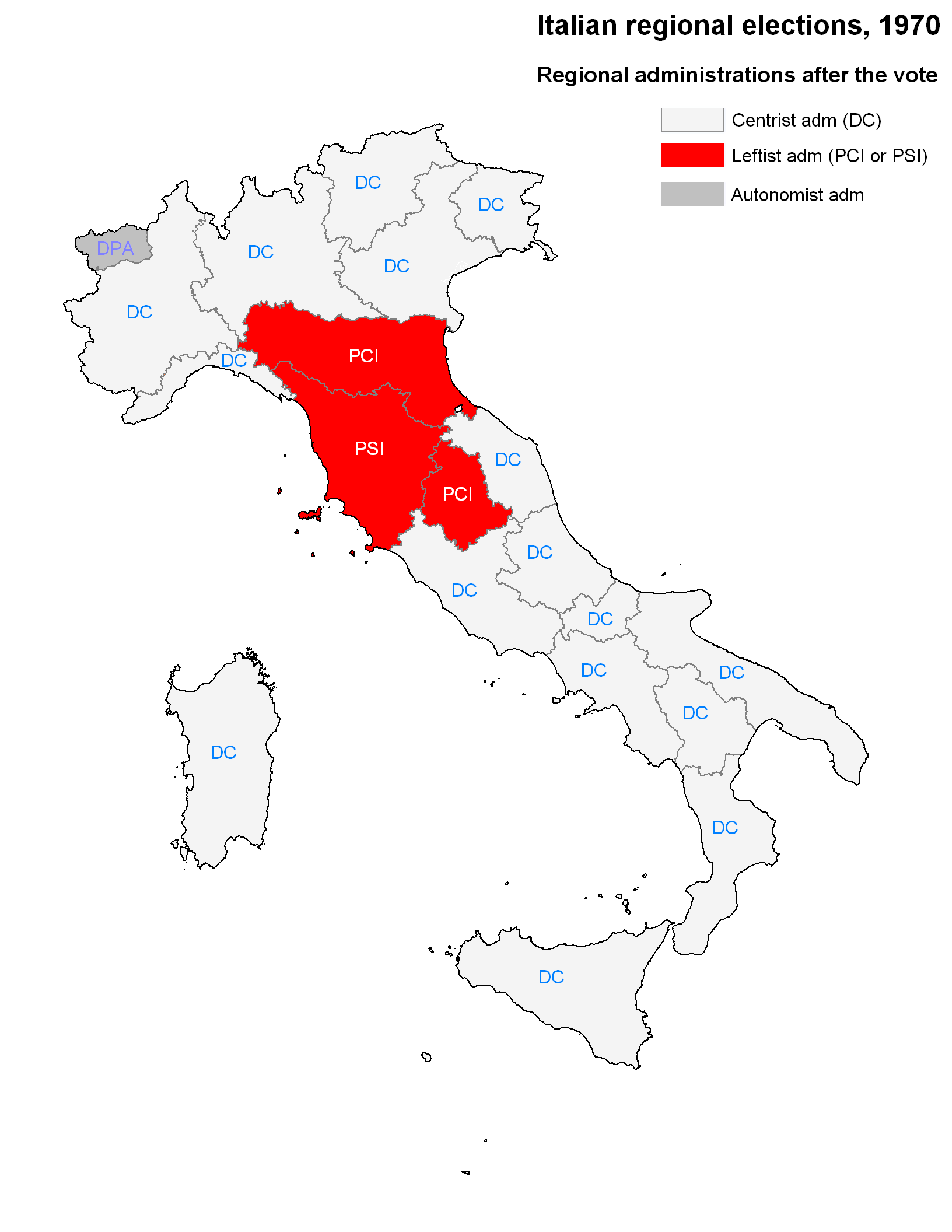

The Italian regional elections of 1970 were held on 7 and 8 June. Even if the regional system was conceived by the Italian Constitution in 1948, the five autonomous regions were the sole to be immediately established. The fifteen ordinary regions were indeed created in 1970 with the first elections.

== Electoral system ==
The pure party-list proportional representation had traditionally become the electoral system of Italy, and it was adopted for the regional vote too. Each Italian province corresponded to a constituency electing a group of candidates. At constituency level, seats were divided between open lists using the largest remainder method with Droop quota. Remaining votes and seats were transferred at regional level, where they were divided using the Hare quota, and automatically distributed to best losers into the local lists.

== Results summary ==
Party	votes	votes (%)	seats
Christian Democracy (DC)	10,303,236	37.8	287
Italian Communist Party (PCI)	7,586,983	27.9	200
Italian Socialist Party (PSI)	2,837,451	10.4	67
Unitary Socialist Party (PSU)	1,897,034	7.0	41
Italian Social Movement (MSI)	1,621,180	5.9	34
Italian Liberal Party (PLI)	1,290,715	4.8	27
Italian Socialist Party of Proletarian Unity (PSIUP)	878,697	3.2	16
Italian Republican Party (PRI)	787,011	2.9	18
Italian Democratic Party of Monarchist Unity (PDIUM)	195,373	0.7	2
Others	29,482	0.1	-
Total	27,231,789	100	690

Twelve Regional Councils elected an administration led by Christian Democracy in a centrist alliance, while Emilia-Romagna, Umbria and Tuscany chose a leftist administration, the first two regions led by the PCI and the other one by the PSI.

== Results by region ==
- 1970 Abruzzo regional election
- 1970 Apulian regional election
- 1970 Basilicata regional election
- 1970 Calabrian regional election
- 1970 Campania regional election
- 1970 Emilia-Romagna regional election
- 1970 Lazio regional election
- 1970 Ligurian regional election
- 1970 Lombard regional election
- 1970 Marche regional election
- 1970 Molise regional election
- 1970 Piedmontese regional election
- 1970 Tuscan regional election
- 1970 Umbrian regional election
- 1970 Venetian regional election
