= Gianni Baget Bozzo =

Italian Catholic priest and politician (1925–2009)

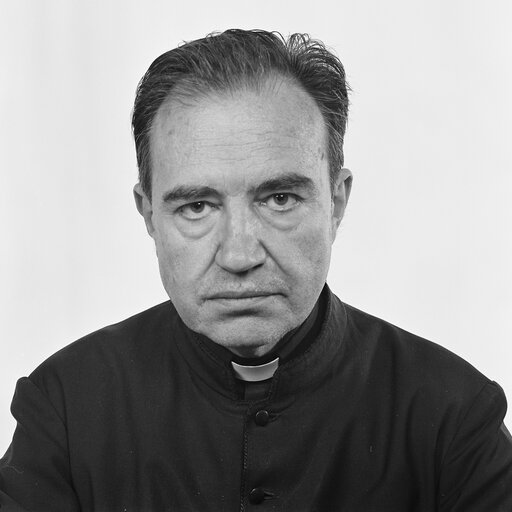
- In office 17 June 1984 – 12 June 1994

Member of the European Parliament for North-West Italy

Personal details
- Born: 8 March 1925 Savona, Kingdom of Italy
- Died: 8 May 2009 (aged 84) Genoa, Italy
- Party: DC (1943–1978); PSI (1978–1994); FI (1994–2008)
- Education: University of Genoa
- Profession: Priest

Gianni Baget Bozzo (8 March 1925 – 8 May 2009) was an Italian Catholic priest and politician.

Baget Bozzo was born in Savona, Liguria, and raised in Genoa where he graduated in law. He was at one-time a Christian Democracy activist, and in 1984, he was elected at the European Parliament for the Italian Socialist Party. From 1994, he had been a member of Silvio Berlusconi's Forza Italia party. In theology, he was a follower of Joseph Ratzinger's theories.

Bozzo died in Genoa, aged 84.

== Works ==
- Giovanni Baget Bozzo, Cristianesimo e ordine civile, Roma, Edizioni romane Mame, 1962.
- Giovanni Baget-Bozzo, Il Cristianesimo nell'eta postmoderna, Torino, CET, 1962.
- Problemi della politica italiana / a cura di Giovanni Baget-Bozzo, Nicola Guiso, Paolo Possenti, Roma, Tip. editrice romana, 1963.
- Gianni Baget Bozzo, Claudio Leonardi, Il tempo dell'Apocalisse, Roma, 1968 (pro ms.)
- Gianni Baget Bozzo, Chiesa e utopia, Bologna, Il Mulino, 1971.
- Gianni Baget Bozzo, Cristianesimo e antropologia, Padova, Rebellato, 1971.
- La vita quotidiana del cristiano, Atti del 7. Convegno di teologia pastorale organizzato dalla rivista Studi cattolici sul tema Per una pastorale della vita quotidiana: 24-27 luglio 1972, saggi di G. Baget-Bozzo e altri, Milano, Ares, 1973.
- Gianni Baget Bozzo, Il partito cristiano al potere: la DC di De Gasperi e di Dossetti 1945-1954, Firenze, Vallecchi, 1974.
- Gianni Baget Bozzo, Il partito cristiano e l'apertura a sinistra: la DC di Fanfani e di Moro 1954-1962, Firenze, Vallecchi, 1977.
- Gianni Baget Bozzo, Il partito cristiano, il comunismo e la società radicale, Firenze, Vallecchi, 1977.
- Gianni Baget Bozzo, I cattolici e la lettera di Berlinguer, Firenze, Vallecchi, 1978.
- Gianni Baget Bozzo, Democrazia cristiana, Moro, «partito americano», in Argomenti radicali, n, 10, 1978.
- Gianni Baget Bozzo, L'elefante e la balena. Cronache del compromesso e del confronto, Bologna, Cappelli, 1979.
- Gianni Baget Bozzo, Questi cattolici. Intervista di Carlo Cardia, Editori Riuniti, 1979.
- Gianni Baget Bozzo, La chiesa e la cultura radicale, Queriniana, 1979.
- Gianni Baget Bozzo e altri, I socialisti e la questione cattolica, Milano, Mondo Operaio-Avanti, 1979.
- Religiosi e laici di fronte all'apocalisse / un saggio di Ernesto Balducci; conversazioni con Gianni Baget Bozzo e altri; conversazioni a cura di Gaetano Besana e Pino Mercuri, Milano, Edizioni dell'apocalisse, 1979.
- Gianni Baget Bozzo, La Trinità, Firenze, Vallecchi, 1980.
- Gianni Baget Bozzo, Tesi sulla DC. Rinasce la questione nazionale, Bologna, Cappelli, 1980.
- Gianni Baget Bozzo, Di fronte all'Islam. Il grande conflitto, Marietti, 1980.
- Gianni Baget Bozzo, Edoardo Benvenuto, La conoscenza di Dio, Edizioni Borla, 1980.
- Gianni Baget Bozzo, L'anticristo, Mondadori, 1980.
- Gianni Baget Bozzo, Ortodossia e liberazione. Un'interpretazione di Papa Wojtyla, Milano, Rizzoli, 1980.
- Gianni Baget Bozzo, L' ultimo giorno è più vicino, Genesi, 1980.
- Gianni Baget Bozzo e altri, Processo alla politica, Roma, Lavoro, 1980.
- Io e la morte, introduzione di Osvaldo G.V. Piccardo; uno scritto di Barbara Alberti; conversazioni con Gianni Baget Bozzo e altri; a cura di Pino Mercuri, Milano, Apocalisse, 1980.
- Sette utopie americane : l'architettura del socialismo comunitario : 1790-1975, Dolores Hayden; con in appendice uno scritto di Gianni Baget-Bozzo Milano : Feltrinelli, 1980.
- Gianni Baget Bozzo, Dal sacro al mistico. Parlare del Cristianesimo come se fosse la prima volta, Feltrinelli, 1981.
- Gianni Baget Bozzo, Edoardo Benvenuto, La figura e il Regno, Vallecchi, 1981.
- Nonviolenza e marxismo nella transizione al socialismo, convegno a Perugia nell'ottobre 1978; a cura della Fondazione Centro studi Aldo Capitini e del Movimento nonviolento; con scritti di Gianni Baget Bozzo e altri. Milano, Feltrinelli, 1981.
- Gianni Baget Bozzo, Vocazione, Milano, Rizzoli, 1982.
- Gianni Baget Bozzo, Il futuro viene dal futuro. Ipotesi sui cattolici e sui democristiani, Editori Riuniti, 1982.
- Gianni Baget Bozzo, Giovanni Tassani, Aldo Moro: il politico nella crisi, 1962-1973, Firenze, Sansoni, 1983.
- Critica della crisi, Gianfranco Albertelli, Gianfranco Ferrari; saggi di Gianni Baget-Bozzo e altri, Trento, L. Reverdito, 1983.
- Gianni Baget Bozzo in collaborazione con Giorgio Sacchi, Manuale di mistica, Milano, Rizzoli, 1984.
- Gianni Baget Bozzo, E Dio creò Dio, Milano, Rizzoli, 1985.
- Gianni Baget Bozzo e altri, Il pensiero strategico, a cura di Carlo Jean, Milano, F. Angeli, 1985.
- Gianni Baget Bozzo, Prima del bene e del male, Milano, Rizzoli, 1987.
- Gianni Baget Bozzo, Michele Genovese, Europa : una speranza contro la ragione, Trento, L. Reverdito, 1987.
- Gianni Baget Bozzo, I tempi e l'eterno. Intervista su un'esperienza teologica, a cura di Claudio Leonardi e Giovanni Tassani. Genova, Marietti, 1988.
- Gianni Baget Bozzo, L' uomo l' angelo il demone, Milano, Rizzoli, 1989.
- Gianni Baget Bozzo, Michele Genovese, 1992 : come convivere con il grande mercato, Trento, L. Reverdito, 1989.
- Gianni Baget Bozzo, Michele Genovese, L'Europa nel declino degli imperi : dopo Yalta, la Germania?, Venezia, Marsilio, 1990.
- L'Autunno del diavolo : "Diabolos, dialogos, daimon", convegno di Torino 17-21 ottobre 1988, a cura di Eugenio Corsini e altri; testi di Baget Bozzo e altri. Milano, Bompiani, 1990.
- Morte e riscoperta dello stato-nazione, a cura di Carlo Jean; con scritti di Gianni Baget Bozzo e altri. Milano, Franco Angeli, 1991.
- Gianni Baget Bozzo, Fabrizio Gualco, Le metamorfosi della cristianità: Chiesa, socialismo, società tecnologica, SugarCo, 1991.
- Luoghi del Seicento genovese : spazi architettonici, spazi dipinti, a cura di Liliana Pittarello; con scritti di Gianni Baget Bozzo e altri. Bologna, Nuova Alfa, 1992.
- Gianni Baget Bozzo, La nuova terra, Milano, Rizzoli, 1993.
- Gianni Baget Bozzo, Cattolici e democristiani, Milano, Rizzoli, 1994.
- Gianni Baget Bozzo, Dio e l' Occidente: lo sguardo nel divino, Milano, Leonardo, c1995.
- Gianni Baget Bozzo, Buona domenica. Anno A, EDB, 1995.
- Gianni Baget Bozzo, Buona domenica. Anno B, EDB, 1996.
- Gianni Baget Bozzo, Buona domenica. Anno C, EDB, 1997.
- Gianni Baget Bozzo, Il futuro del cattolicesimo. La Chiesa dopo papa Wojtyla, Casale Monferrato, Piemme, 1997.
- Gianni Baget Bozzo, La cultura politica di Forza Italia : il liberalismo popolare, Como, Malinverno, 1997.
- Gianni Baget Bozzo, Il Dio perduto, Mondadori, 1999.
- Sopravviverà la Chiesa nel terzo millennio? / Pier Michele Girola, Gian Luca Mazzini; rispondono: Gianni Baget Bozzo e altri; con un saggio introduttivo di Franco Cardini, Milano, Edizioni Paoline, 1999.
- Gianni Baget Bozzo, Come sono arrivato a Berlusconi. Dal PSI di Craxi a Forza Italia. Fede, Chiesa e religione, Marco, 2001.
- Gianni Baget Bozzo e altri, La navicella della metafisica : dibattito sul nichilismo e la Terza navigazione, Roma, Armando, 2000.
- Gianni Baget Bozzo, Claudio Leonardi, Homo Dei. Resoconto di un'esperienza mistica, SISMEL - Edizioni del Galluzzo, 2001.
- Gianni Baget Bozzo, Di fronte all'islam : il grande conflitto, Genova, Marietti, 2001.
- Gianni Baget Bozzo, con Marco Vannini e altri (ed.), Mistica d'Oriente e Occidente oggi, Milano, Paoline, 2001.
- Gianni Baget Bozzo, Profezia. Il Cristianesimo non è una religione, Milano, Mondadori, 2002.
- Gianni Baget Bozzo, Io credo. Il simbolo della fede parola per parola-Lettera a un vescovo su «Chiesa e Occidente», Mondadori, 2003.
- Gianni Baget Bozzo, Alessandro Di Chiara, Cristo e/o Chiesa, Àncora, 2003.
- Gianni Baget Bozzo, L' impero d' Occidente. La storia ritorna, Lindau, 2004.
- Gianni Baget Bozzo, L'intreccio. Cattolici e comunisti 1945-2004, Mondadori, 2004.
- Gianni Baget Bozzo, Verità dimenticate. Vita eterna, anima, escatologia, Àncora, 2005.
- Gianni Baget Bozzo, Vocazione: mistica e libertà, Lindau, 2005.
- Gianni Baget Bozzo, Raffaele Iannuzzi, Tra nichilismo e Islam. L'Europa come colpa, Mondadori, 2006.
- Maria, l'Apocalisse e il Medioevo, Atti del III incontro di Mariologia medievale (Parma, 10-11 maggio 2002) / a cura di Clelia Maria Piastra e Francesco Santi; con scritti di Gianni Baget Bozzo: L'Immacolata Concezione e la coscienza mistica, e altri. Firenze, SISMEL, 2006.
