= Benigno Zaccagnini =

Italian politician (1912–1989)

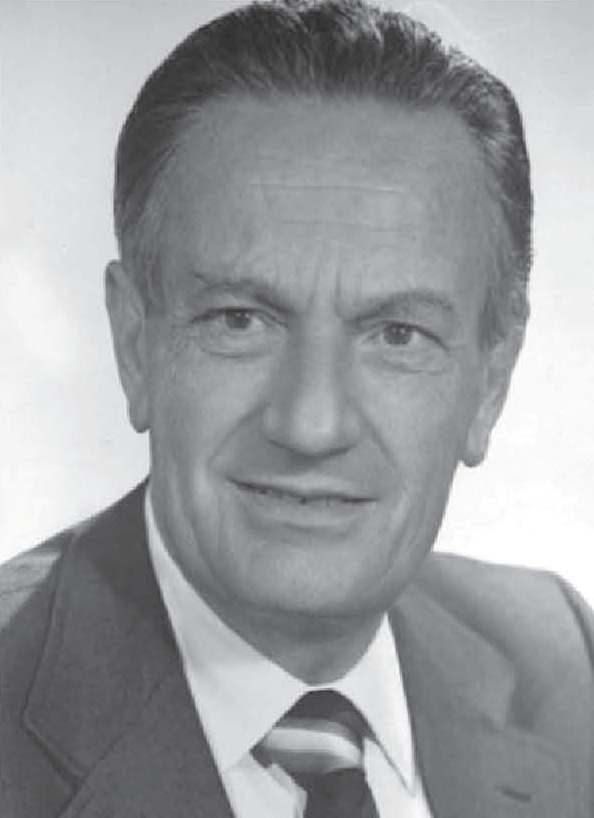

Secretary of Christian Democracy
- In office 26 July 1975 – 1 February 1980
- Preceded by: Amintore Fanfani
- Succeeded by: Flaminio Piccoli

Minister of Public Works
- In office 26 July 1960 – 21 February 1962
- Prime Minister: Amintore Fanfani
- Preceded by: Giuseppe Togni
- Succeeded by: Fiorentino Sullo

Minister of Labour and Social Security
- In office 15 February 1959 – 26 July 1960
- Prime Minister: Antonio Segni; Fernando Tambroni
- Preceded by: Ezio Vigorelli
- Succeeded by: Fiorentino Sullo
Parliamentary offices
Member of the Senate of the Republic
In office 12 July 1983 – 5 November 1989
Constituency	Emilia-Romagna
Member of the European Parliament
In office 17 July 1979 – 21 November 1981
Constituency	North-West Italy
Member of the Chamber of Deputies
In office 8 May 1948 – 11 July 1983
Constituency	Bologna
Member of the Constituent Assembly
In office 25 June 1946 – 31 January 1948
Constituency	Bologna

Personal details
- Born: 17 April 1912 Faenza, Kingdom of Italy
- Died: 5 November 1989 (aged 77) Ravenna, Italy
- Party: Christian Democracy
- Education: University of Bologna
- Profession: Politician, pediatrician

Benigno Zaccagnini (Italian pronunciation: [beˈniɲɲo ddzakkaɲˈɲiːni]; 17 April 1912 – 5 November 1989) was an Italian politician and physician.

== Biography ==
Born in Faenza, Zaccagnini graduated in Pediatrics in 1937. During World War II he acted as partisan, collaborating with Arrigo Boldrini in the liberation of Romagna.

Zaccagnini was among the founders of the Christian Democracy (DC), and was elected at the Constituent Assembly (1946) and the Chamber of Deputies (1948) of the new-born Italian Republic. He was a member of the Christian Democratic wing more favourable to a collaboration with left (or centre-left) parties. He was confirmed at the Chambers of Deputies until 1979, when he was elected to the Italian Senate.

In 1959, Zaccagnini was appointed Minister of Labour and Social Security in the Segni II Cabinet, a position he maintained also in the following government led by Fernando Tambroni. In 1960 he was appointed Minister of Public Works in the Fanfani III Cabinet.

In 1975, Zaccagnini was elected National Secretary of DC, remaining in place until 1980 when he was replaced by Flaminio Piccoli. In 1984 he was elected in the European Parliament. In 1978, during his tenure as national secretary, Democrazia Cristiana's president and Zaccagnini's mentor Aldo Moro was kidnapped by terrorist group Brigate Rosse. The prisoner wrote numerous letters to Zaccagnini, initially invoking his help, then accusing him and other DC leaders of sacrificing him in order to save the new government, which Moro had been instrumental to form.

Zaccagnini died at Ravenna in 1989.

== Electoral history ==
Election	House	Constituency	Party	Votes	Result
1946	Constituent Assembly	Bologna–Ferrara–Ravenna–Forlì	DC	11,121	Elected
1948	Chamber of Deputies	Bologna–Ferrara–Ravenna–Forlì	DC	16,896	Elected
1953	Chamber of Deputies	Bologna–Ferrara–Ravenna–Forlì	DC	23,611	Elected
1958	Chamber of Deputies	Bologna–Ferrara–Ravenna–Forlì	DC	23,611	Elected
1963	Chamber of Deputies	Bologna–Ferrara–Ravenna–Forlì	DC	43,603	Elected
1968	Chamber of Deputies	Bologna–Ferrara–Ravenna–Forlì	DC	37,866	Elected
1972	Chamber of Deputies	Bologna–Ferrara–Ravenna–Forlì	DC	39,444	Elected
1976	Chamber of Deputies	Bologna–Ferrara–Ravenna–Forlì	DC	101,911	Elected
1979	Chamber of Deputies	Bologna–Ferrara–Ravenna–Forlì	DC	67,603	Elected
1979	European Parliament	North-West Italy	DC	737,499	Elected
1983	Senate of the Republic	Emilia-Romagna – Borgotaro-Salsomaggiore	DC	25,798	Elected
1987	Senate of the Republic	Emilia-Romagna – Fiorenzuola-Fidenza	DC	32,787	Elected
