= Christian Democracy (Italy) =

Italian political party (1943–1994)

Christian Democracy Democrazia Cristiana
- Abbreviation: DC
- Leader: Alcide De Gasperi (first); Mino Martinazzoli (last)
- Founded: 15 December 1943; 82 years ago
- Dissolved: 16 January 1994; 32 years ago
- Preceded by: Italian People's Party (pre-Fascist-era precursor)
- Succeeded by: Italian People's Party
- Headquarters: Piazza del Gesù, Rome, Italy
- Newspaper: Il Popolo; La Discussione
- Youth wing: Christian Democracy Youth Movement
- Women's wing: Christian Democracy Women Movement
- Membership (1990): 2,109,670
- Ideology: Christian democracy (Italian)
- Political position: Centre
- Religion: Catholicism
- National affiliation: National Liberation Committee (1943–1947); Centrism (1947–1959); Centre-left (1961–1976); Pentapartito (1980–1991)
- European affiliation: European People's Party
- European Parliament group: European People's Party
- International affiliation: Christian Democrat International
- Colors: White
- Anthem: O bianco fiore ("O White Flower")

Party flag

Christian Democracy (Italian: Democrazia Cristiana [demokratˈtsiːa kriˈstjaːna], DC) was a Christian democratic political party in Italy. The DC was founded on 15 December 1943 in the Italian Social Republic (Nazi-occupied Italy) as the nominal successor of the Italian People's Party, which had the same symbol, a crusader shield (scudo crociato). As a Catholic-inspired, centrist, catch-all party comprising both centre-right and centre-left political factions, the DC played a dominant role in the politics of Italy for fifty years, and was part of the government from soon after its inception until its final demise on 16 January 1994 amid the Tangentopoli scandals. Christian Democrats led the Italian government continuously from 1946 until 1981. The party was nicknamed the "White Whale" (Italian: Balena bianca) due to its huge organisation and official colour. During its time in government, the Italian Communist Party was the largest opposition party.

From 1946 until 1994, the DC was the largest party in the Italian Parliament, governing in successive coalitions, including the Pentapartito system. It originally supported liberal-conservative governments, along with the moderate Italian Democratic Socialist Party, the Italian Liberal Party, and the Italian Republican Party, before moving towards the Organic Centre-left involving the Italian Socialist Party. The party was succeeded by a string of smaller parties, including the Italian People's Party, the Christian Democratic Centre, the United Christian Democrats, and the still active Union of the Centre. Former DC members are also spread among other parties, including the centre-right Forza Italia and the centre-left Democratic Party. It was a founding member of the European People's Party in 1976.

== History ==
=== Early years ===
The party was founded as the revival of the Italian People's Party (PPI), a political party created in 1919 by Luigi Sturzo, a Catholic priest. The PPI won over 20% of the votes in the 1919 and 1921 general elections, but was declared illegal by the Fascist dictatorship in 1926 despite the presence of some Popolari in Benito Mussolini's first government.

As World War II was ending, the Christian Democrats started organising post-Fascist Italy in coalition with all the other mainstream parties, including the Italian Communist Party (PCI), the Italian Socialist Party (PSI), the Italian Liberal Party (PLI), the Italian Republican Party (PRI), the Action Party (Pd'A) and the Labour Democratic Party (PDL). In December 1945 Christian Democrat Alcide De Gasperi was appointed Prime Minister of Italy.

The Christian Democracy party was opposed to both Fascism and Communism. During this era, Italians were voting based on a way of life, not just a political party. Christian ideals were usually paired with the idea of freedom.

In the 1946 general election the DC won 35.2% of the vote.

=== De Gasperi and centrism ===
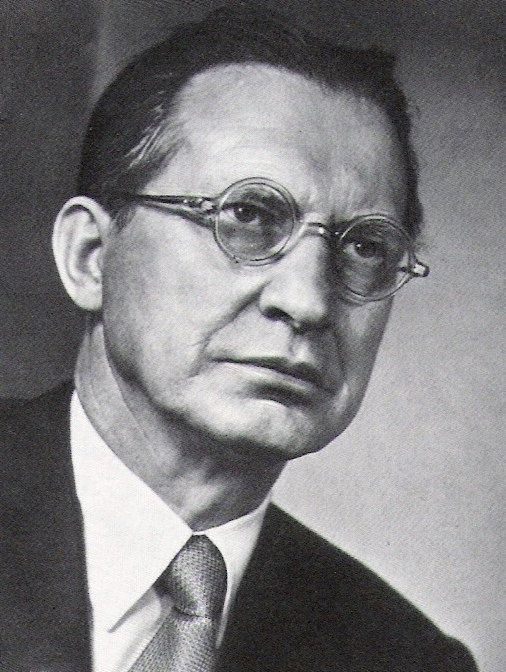
Alcide De Gasperi

In May 1947 De Gasperi broke decisively with his Communist and Socialist coalition partners under pressure from U.S. President Harry Truman. This opened the way for a centrist coalition that included the Italian Workers' Socialist Party (PSLI), a centrist break-away from the PSI, as well as its usual allies, the PLI and the PRI.

In the 1948 general election the DC went on to win a decisive victory, with the support of the Catholic Church and the United States, and obtained 48.5% of the vote, its best result ever. Despite his party's absolute majority in the Italian Parliament, De Gasperi continued to govern at the head of the centrist coalition, which was successively abandoned by the Liberals, who hoped for more right-wing policies, in 1950 and the Democratic Socialists, who hoped for more leftist policies, in 1951.

Under De Gasperi, major land reforms were carried out in the poorer rural regions in the early postwar years, with farms appropriated from the large landowners and parcelled out to the peasants. In addition, during its years in office, Christian Democrats passed a number of laws safeguarding employees from exploitation, established a national health service, and initiated low-cost housing in Italy's major cities.

De Gasperi served as prime minister until 1953 and died a year later. No Christian Democrat would match his longevity in office and, despite the fact that DC's share of the vote was always between 38 and 43% from 1953 to 1979, the party was increasingly fractured. As a result, Prime Ministers changed more frequently.

=== Centre-left governments ===
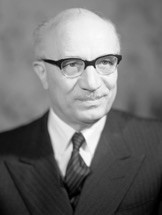
Amintore Fanfani

Aldo Moro

From 1954 the DC was led by progressive Christian Democrats, such as Amintore Fanfani, Aldo Moro and Benigno Zaccagnini, supported by the influential left-wing factions. In the 1950s the party formed centrist or moderately centre-left coalitions, and even a short-lived government led by Fernando Tambroni relying on parliamentary support from the Italian Social Movement (MSI), the post-fascist party.

In 1963 the party, under Prime Minister Aldo Moro, formed a coalition with the PSI, which returned to ministerial roles after 16 years, the PSDI and the PRI. Similar "Organic Centre-left" governments became usual through the 1960s and the 1970s.

=== Historic Compromise ===
From 1976 to 1979 the DC governed with the external support of the PCI, through the Historic Compromise. Moro, who was the party main leader and who had inspired the Compromise, was abducted and murdered by the Red Brigades.

The event was a shock for the party. When Moro was abducted, the government, at the time led by Giulio Andreotti, immediately took a hardline position stating that the "State must not bend" on terrorist demands. This was a very different position from the one taken in similar cases before and after (such as the kidnapping of Ciro Cirillo, a Campanian DC member for whom a ransom was paid thanks to the local ties of the party with the Camorra). It was however supported by all the mainstream parties, including the PCI, with the two notable exceptions of the PSI and the Radicals. In the trial for Mafia allegations against Andreotti, it was said that he took the chance of getting rid of a dangerous political competitor by sabotaging all of the rescue options and ultimately leaving the captors with no option but killing him. During his captivity Moro wrote a series of letters, at times very critical of Andreotti.. Later the memorial written by Moro during his imprisonment was subject to several plots, including the assassination of journalist Mino Pecorelli and general Carlo Alberto Dalla Chiesa.

=== Pentapartito ===
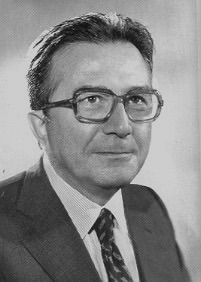
Giulio Andreotti

At the beginning of the 1980s, the DC had lost part of its support among Italian voters. In 1981, Giovanni Spadolini of the PRI was the first non-Christian Democrat to lead a government since 1944, at the head of a coalition comprising the DC, the PSI, the PSDI, the PRI and the PLI, the so-called Pentapartito. In the successive 1983 general election, the DC suffered one of its largest declines in votes up to that point, receiving only 32.5% of the vote cast (a decline of -5.8% relative to 1981). Subsequently, Bettino Craxi (leader of the rising PSI) reclaimed for himself the post of prime minister, again at the head of a Pentapartito government.

DC re-gained the post of prime minister in 1987, after a modest recovery in the 1987 general election (34.2%), and the Pentapartito coalition governed Italy almost continuously until 1993. While Italy experienced steady economic progress in the 1980s, the Italian economy was being undermined by a constant devaluation of the Italian lira and the issuing of large amounts of high-interest treasury bonds, so that, between 1982 and 1992, the excessive budget deficit built a significant proportion of the debt that would plague the country well into the 21st century.

=== Dissolution and aftermath ===
In 1992 the Mani pulite investigation was started in Milan, uncovering the so-called Tangentopoli scandals (endemic corruption practices at the highest levels), and causing numerous, often controversial, arrests and resignations. After the dismal result in the 1992 general election (29.7%), also due to the rise of Lega Nord in northern Italy and two years of mounting scandals (which included several Mafia investigations which notably touched Andreotti), the party was disbanded in 1994. In the 1990s most of the politicians prosecuted during those investigations were acquitted, sometimes however on the basis of legal formalities or on the basis of the Statute of limitations.

In 1992, Mario Segni led a breakaway faction called Populars for Reform (PR). The DC suffered heavy defeats in the 1993 provincial and municipal elections. Subsequently, Segni's PR would be reformed as the Segni Pact, and contemporary polling suggested heavy losses for the DC in the upcoming 1994 general election. In hopes of changing the party's image, the DC's last secretary, Mino Martinazzoli decided to change the name of the party into the Italian People's Party (PPI).

Pier Ferdinando Casini, representing the right-wing faction of the party (previously led by Forlani) decided to launch a new party called Christian Democratic Centre and form an alliance with Silvio Berlusconi's new party, Forza Italia (FI). The left-wing factions stayed within the new PPI, though a minority would form the Social Christians in 1993 and would join forces with the post-communist Democratic Party of the Left (DPS). Some right-wingers, feeling Casini was still too moderate, joined the National Alliance.

In 1995, the centre-right United Christian Democrats, which were led by Rocco Buttiglione, split off from the PPI and also entered in alliance with FI. In the following years, most Christian Democrats joined FI, which became the party with the most ex-DC members in absolute terms. In December 1999, Forza Italia gained full membership in the European People's Party.

The PPI would continue in a rump fashion, usually finding itself in left of centre political coalitions. In 1996, under Franco Marini, the PPI would ally with the DPS and several smaller centre-left parties to form The Olive Tree. The alliance, whose primary components were two legal successors to the two major political forces of pre-1990s Italy, won the election. Romano Prodi, an independent former PPI member, led the list and became prime minister.

Faced with flagging poll numbers, the PPI formed Democracy is Freedom – The Daisy (DL) after allying three other smaller, social liberal parties to contest the 2001 election. DL would be formed as an official political party in 2002, succeeding the PPI and its three allies. In 2007, DL would merge with the Democrats of the Left, the successor of the DPS, to form the Democratic Party, which is today (Note: As of the 2022 Italian general election) the largest centre-left political party in Italy.

== Ideology ==
Propaganda posters of the DC: they described to potential voters the party's commitment to anti-communism (in the left poster), traditionalism (in the centre poster), and family values (in the right poster). Note the use of symbols, especially the crusader shield (representing the DC) protecting Italy (represented by Italia Turrita) from the communist hammer and sickle symbol being used as a weapon in the left poster.

The party's ideology drew on the Christian democratic doctrines developed from the 19th century referred to as Catholic social teaching, the political thought of Romolo Murri and Luigi Sturzo, and ultimately the tradition of the defunct Italian People's Party. Two Papal encyclicals, Rerum novarum (1891) of Pope Leo XIII, and Quadragesimo anno (1931) of Pope Pius XI, offered a further basis for the DC's social and political doctrine.

In economics, the DC preferred competition to cooperation, supported the model of social market economy, and rejected the Marxist idea of class struggle. The party thus advocated collaboration between social classes and was basically a catch-all party which aimed to represent both right-wing and left-wing Italian Catholics under the principle of the "political unity of Catholics" against socialism, communism and anarchism. It ultimately represented the majority of Italians who were opposed to the Italian Communist Party. The party was, however, originally equidistant between the Communists and the hard right represented by the Italian Social Movement.

As a catch-all party, the DC differed from other European Christian Democratic parties, such as the Christian Democratic Union of Germany, that were mainly conservative political groupings. The DC, which included conservative as well as social democratic, socially conservative and liberal elements, was characterised by factionalism and by the double adherence of members to the party and to factions which were often identified with individual leaders.

Regarding social conservatism, although the party was generally in favor of women's suffrage following the Second World War, there were concerns within its ranks that, through their new participation in political life, women might gradually drift away from traditional values, "undermining the unity of the family".

=== Factions ===
The DC's factions spanned the political spectrum from left to right and continually evolved over time.

In the early years, centrists and liberal-conservatives such as Alcide De Gasperi, Giuseppe Pella, Ezio Vanoni and Mario Scelba led the party. After them, progressives led by Amintore Fanfani were in charge, though opposed by right wing led by Antonio Segni. The party's left wing, with its roots in the left of the late Italian People's Party (Giovanni Gronchi, Achille Grandi and controversial Fernando Tambroni), was reinforced by new leaders such as Giuseppe Dossetti, Giorgio La Pira, Giuseppe Lazzati and Fanfani himself. Most of them were social democrats by European standards.

The party was often led by centrist figures unaffiliated to any faction such as Aldo Moro, Mariano Rumor (both closer to the centre-left) and Giulio Andreotti (closer to the centre-right). Moreover, it was often the case that if the government was led by a centre-right Christian Democrat, the party was led by a left-winger and vice versa. This was what happened in the 1950s when Fanfani was party secretary and the government was led by centre-right figures such as Scelba and Segni, as well as in the late 1970s when Benigno Zaccagnini, a progressive, led the party and Andreotti the government. This custom, in clear contrast with the principles of a Westminster system, deeply weakened DC-led governments, so that even with broad majorities they were unable to resolve differences between the several factions of the party, and ultimately turning the Italian political system into a de facto particracy (partitocrazia).

From the 1980s the party was divided between the centre-right led by Arnaldo Forlani (supported also by the party's right wing) and the centre-left led by Ciriaco De Mita (whose supporters included trade unionists and the internal left), with Andreotti holding the balance. De Mita, who led the party from 1982 to 1989, tried to transform the party into a mainstream "conservative party" in line with the European People's Party to preserve party unity. He became prime minister in 1988 but was replaced by Forlani in 1989. Disagreements between de Mita and Forlani brought Andreotti back to the prime-ministership from 1989 to 1992.

With the fall of the Berlin Wall and the end of the great Cold War ideological conflict, and ultimately the Tangentopoli scandals, the heterogeneous nature of the party led it to its collapse. The bulk of the DC's membership joined the new Italian People's Party (PPI), but immediately several centre-right elements led by Pier Ferdinando Casini joined the Christian Democratic Centre (CCD), while others directly joined Forza Italia. A split from the PPI, the United Christian Democrats (CDU), joined Forza Italia and the CCD in the centre-right Pole of Freedoms coalition (later becoming the Pole for Freedoms), while the PPI was a founding member of The Olive Tree centre-left coalition in 1996.

== Popular support ==
In its early years, the party was stronger in Northern Italy (especially in eastern Lombardy and Veneto), due to the strong Catholic roots of those areas, than it was in the South. There, the Liberal establishment that had governed Italy for decades before the rise of Benito Mussolini still had grip on voters, as well as the Monarchist National Party and the Common Man's Front. The DC was very weak in Emilia-Romagna and Central Italy, where the Italian Communist Party was the dominant political force.

In the 1948 general election the party had its best result ever (48.5%) and an absolute majority in the Italian Parliament. The party won 66.8% in eastern Lombardy (73.6% in the Province of Bergamo), 60.5% in Veneto (71.9% in the Province of Vicenza), 69.6% in Trentino and 57.8% in Friuli-Venezia Giulia, that is to say where the late Italian People's Party had its strongholds. In the Centre-South the DC gained more than 50% of the vote in Lazio (51.9%), Abruzzo (53.7%) and Campania (50.5%).

From the late 1950s, the DC's support started to move South and by the 1980s it was stronger in the South than in the North, with the exception of Veneto, which remained one of the party's strongholds. In the 1983 general election the party suffered a dramatic decrease in term of votes and its electoral geography was very different from 30 or even 10 years before, as the region where it obtained the best result was Apulia (46.0%).

In the 1992 general election the shift was even more evident as the party was over the 40% mark only in some Southern regions (41.1% in Campania, 44.5 in Basilicata and 41.2% in Sicily), while it barely reached 20–25% of the vote in the North. As a result of the rise of Lega Nord, which was stronger precisely in the traditional Christian Democratic heartlands, the DC was reduced to 21.0% in Piedmont (with the League at 16.3%), 32.1% in western Lombardy (League at 25.2%), 31.7% in Veneto (League at 17.3%) and 28.0% in Friuli-Venezia Giulia (League at 17.0%).

As the DC's role was reduced, the 1919 PPI strongholds and the DC's traditional heartlands would become the Lega Nord's power base. Meanwhile, the successor parties of the DC continued to be key political actors only in the South, where the clientelistic way of government practised by the Christian Democrats and their allies had left a mark. In the 1996 general election the League gained 7 out of 8 single-seat constituencies in the Province of Bergamo and 5 out of 6 in the Province of Vicenza, winning well over 40%, while the combined score of the three main post-DC parties (the new PPI, the CCD and the CDU) was highest in Campania (22.3%). In the 1996 Sicilian regional election the combined score of those parties was 26.4%.

The electoral results of the DC in general (Chamber of Deputies) and European Parliament elections since 1946 are shown in the chart below.

View source data.

== Controversies ==
DC election poster for Mafia boss Giuseppe Genco Russo

Having ruled Italy for over 40 years with no alternative other than the Italian Communist Party, DC members had ample opportunity to abuse their power, and some did. In the 1960s, scandals involved frauds such as huge illegal profits in the administration of banana import quotas and preferential allocation of purposely misprinted and therefore rare postage stamps. Giovanni Leone was forced to resign as President of the Italian Republic in 1978 after the Lockheed bribery scandals. He was later acquitted.

Like the other parties of the Pentapartito coalition, the DC was invested in the Tangentopoli scandals and in the subsequent Mani pulite. Moreover, as Southern Italy had become the party's stronghold in the 1970s and the 1980s, it was likely that the Sicilian Mafia and dishonest politicians tried to collaborate. The DC was the party most associated with Mafia among the public. Leaders such as Antonio Gava, Calogero Mannino, Vito Ciancimino, Salvo Lima and especially Giulio Andreotti were perceived by many to belong to a grey zone between simple corruption and Mafia business, even if most of them were later acquitted.

== Election results ==
=== Italian Parliament ===
Election	Leader	Chamber of Deputies					Senate of the Republic				
Election	Leader	Votes	%	Seats	+/–	Position	Votes	%	Seats	+/–	Position
1946	Alcide De Gasperi	8,101,004	35.2	207 / 556	▲207	▲1st	No election				
1948	Alcide De Gasperi	12,740,042	48.5	305 / 574	▲98	1st	10,899,640	48.1	131 / 237	▲131	▲1st
1953	Alcide De Gasperi	10,862,073	40.1	263 / 590	▼42	1st	10,862,073	40.7	116 / 237	▼15	1st
1958	Amintore Fanfani	12,520,207	42.4	273 / 596	▲10	1st	12,520,207	41.2	123 / 246	▲7	1st
1963	Aldo Moro	11,773,182	38.3	260 / 630	▼13	1st	10,032,458	36.6	132 / 315	▲9	1st
1968	Mariano Rumor	12,441,553	39.1	266 / 630	▲6	1st	10,965,790	38.3	135 / 315	▲3	1st
1972	Arnaldo Forlani	12,919,270	38.7	266 / 630	0	1st	11,466,701	38.1	135 / 315	0	1st
1976	Benigno Zaccagnini	14,218,298	38.7	263 / 630	▼3	1st	12,226,768	38.9	135 / 315	0	1st
1979	Benigno Zaccagnini	14,046,290	38.3	262 / 630	▼1	1st	12,018,077	38.3	138 / 315	▲3	1st
1983	Ciriaco De Mita	12,153,081	32.9	225 / 630	▼37	1st	10,081,819	32.4	120 / 315	▼18	1st
1987	Ciriaco De Mita	13,241,188	34.3	234 / 630	▲9	1st	10,897,036	33.6	125 / 315	▲5	1st
1992	Arnaldo Forlani	11,637,569	29.7	206 / 630	▼28	1st	9,088,494	27.3	107 / 315	▼18	1st

=== European Parliament ===
Election	Leader	Votes	%	Seats	+/–	Position	EP Group
1979	Benigno Zaccagnini	12,774,320	36.5	29 / 81	▲29	▲1st	EPP
1984	Ciriaco De Mita	11,583,767	33.0	26 / 81	▼3	▼2nd	EPP
1989	Arnaldo Forlani	11,451,053	32.9	26 / 81	0	▲1st	EPP

=== Regional elections ===
Regions of Italy
Election year	Votes	%	Seats	+/−	Leader
1970	10,303,236 (1st)	37.8	287 / 720	–	Mariano Rumor
1975	10,699,576 (1st)	35.3	277 / 720	▼10	Arnaldo Forlani
1980	11,153,439 (1st)	36.8	290 / 720	▲13	Benigno Zaccagnini
1985	11,223,284 (1st)	35.0	276 / 720	▼14	Arnaldo Forlani
1990	10,651,675 (1st)	33.4	272 / 720	▼4	Arnaldo Forlani

== Organization ==
=== Symbols ===
The Crusader Shield, DC's official logo

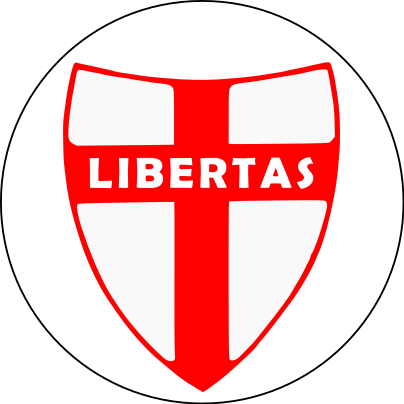
Electoral logo
(1946–1991)

Electoral logo
(1992–1993)

=== Leadership ===
- Secretary: Alcide De Gasperi (1944–1946), Attilio Piccioni (1946–1949), Giuseppe Cappi (1949), Paolo Emilio Taviani (1949–1950), Guido Gonella (1950–1953), Alcide De Gasperi (1953–1954), Amintore Fanfani (1954–1959), Aldo Moro (1959–1964), Mariano Rumor (1964–1969), Flaminio Piccoli (1969), Arnaldo Forlani (1969–1973), Amintore Fanfani (1973–1975), Benigno Zaccagnini (1975–1980), Flaminio Piccoli (1980–1982), Ciriaco De Mita (1982–1989), Arnaldo Forlani (1989–1992), Mino Martinazzoli (1992–1994).
- President: Alcide De Gasperi (1946–1954), Adone Zoli (1954–1960), Attilio Piccioni (1960–1966), Mario Scelba (1966–1969), Benigno Zaccagnini (1969–1975), Amintore Fanfani (1976), Aldo Moro (1976–1978), Flaminio Piccoli (1978–1980), Arnaldo Forlani (1980–1989), Ciriaco De Mita (1989–1992), Rosa Russo Iervolino (1992–1994).
- Party Leader in the Chamber of Deputies: Giovanni Gronchi (1946–1948), Giuseppe Cappi (1948–1949), Giuseppe Spataro (1949), Giuseppe Cappi (1950), Giuseppe Bettiol (1950–1953), Aldo Moro (1953–1956), Attilio Piccioni (1956–1958), Luigi Gui (1958–1962), Benigno Zaccagnini (1962–1968), Fiorentino Sullo (1968), Giulio Andreotti (1968–1972), Flaminio Piccoli (1972–1978), Giovanni Galloni (1978–1979), Gerardo Bianco (1979–1983), Virginio Rognoni (1983–1986), Mino Martinazzoli (1986–1989), Vincenzo Scotti (1989–1990), Antonio Gava (1990–1992), Gerardo Bianco (1992–1994).

== Sources ==
- Massimo L. Salvadori, Enciclopedia storica, Zanichelli, Bologna 2000
- Igino Giordani, De Gasperi, il ricostruttore, Cinque Lune, Rome 1955
- Giulio Andreotti, De Gasperi e il suo tempo, Mondadori, Milan 1956
- Gianni Baget Bozzo, Il partito cristiano al potere: la DC di De Gasperi e di Dossetti 1945–1954, Vallecchi, Florence 1974
- Gianni Baget Bozzo, Il partito cristiano e l'apertura a sinistra: la DC di Fanfani e di Moro 1954–1962, Vallecchi, Florence 1977
- Pietro Scoppola, La proposta politica di De Gasperi, Il Mulino, Bologna 1977
- Nico Perrone, Il segno della DC, Dedalo, Bari 2002 ISBN 88-220-6253-1
- Luciano Radi, La DC da De Gasperi a Fanfani, Rubbettino, Soveria Mannelli 2005
