= 1976 Italian general election =

- 20 June 1976

All 630 seats in the Chamber of Deputies 316 seats needed for a majority All 315 elective seats in the Senate 162 seats needed for a majority (Note: taking into account the Senators for life, which accounted for 7 seats at the time the election took place)
- Registered: 40,426,658 (C) · 34,928,214 (S)
- Turnout: 37,755,090 (C) · 93.4% (▲0.2 pp); 32,621,581 (S) · 93.4% (▲0.1 pp)
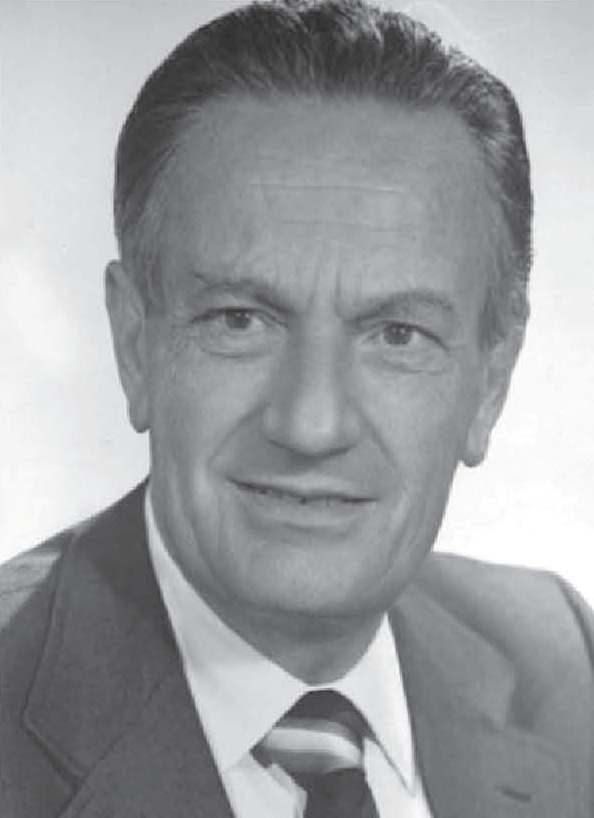

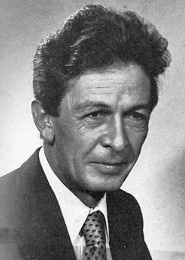

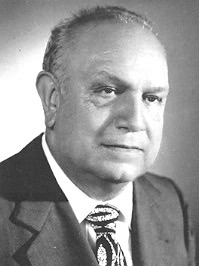

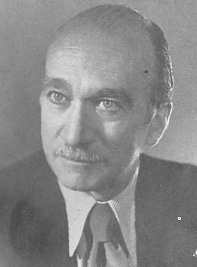

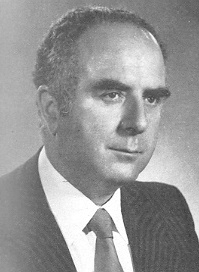

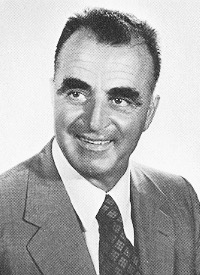
	Majority party	Minority party	Third party
Leader	Benigno Zaccagnini	Enrico Berlinguer	Francesco De Martino
Party	DC	PCI	PSI
Leader since	21 July 1975	17 March 1972	13 March 1971 (Note: De Martino also served as secretary from 1963 to 1968 and from 1969 to 1970.)
Leader's seat	Bologna (C)	Rome (C)	Naples (C)
Seats won	263 (C) / 135 (S)	227 (C) / 116 (S)	57 (C) / 29 (S)
Seat change	▼3 (C) / 0 (S)	▲48 (C) / ▲22 (S)	▼8 (C) / ▼4 (S)
Popular vote	14,218,298 (C); 12,227,353 (S)	12,622,728 (C); 10,637,772 (S)	3,542,998 (C); 3,208,164 (S)
Percentage	38.7% (C); 38.8% (S)	34.4% (C); 33.8% (S)	9.6% (C); 10.2% (S)
Swing	0.0 pp (C) ▲0.7 pp (S)	▲7.3 pp (C) ▲7.2 pp (S)	▼0.4 pp (C) ▼0.5 pp (S)
	Fourth party	Fifth party	Sixth party
Leader	Giorgio Almirante	Pier Luigi Romita	Oddo Biasini
Party	MSI	PSDI	PRI
Leader since	29 June 1969 (Note: Almirante also served as secretary from 1948 to 1950.)	10 October 1976	2 March 1975
Leader's seat	Rome (C)	Turin (C)	Bologna (C)
Seats won	35 (C) / 15 (S)	15 (C) / 6 (S)	14 (C) / 6 (S)
Seat change	▼21 (C) / ▼11 (S)	▼14 (C) / ▼5 (S)	▲1 (C) / ▲1 (S)
Popular vote	2,238,339 (C); 2,086,430 (S)	1,239,492 (C); 974,940 (S)	1,135,546 (C); 846,415 (S)
Percentage	6.1% (C); 6.6% (S)	3.4% (C); 3.1% (S)	3.1% (C); 2.7% (S)
Swing	▼2.6 pp (C) ▼2.6 pp (S)	▼0.5 pp (C) ▼2.3 pp (S)	▲0.2 pp (C) ▼0.4 pp (S)
- Results of the election in the Chamber and Senate.
Prime Minister before election
Aldo Moro
DC
Prime Minister after the election
Giulio Andreotti
DC

The 1976 Italian general election was held in Italy on 20 June 1976. It was the first election after the voting age was lowered to 18.

Christian Democracy (DC) won roughly the same number of votes as it had four years prior. The Italian Communist Party performed well, winning seven percent more votes than the previous election, while minor parties lost votes to the Christian Democrats due to fears of communism. The historic Italian Liberal Party was nearly annihilated. Two new parties made their debut in this election: the liberal Radical Party, which had led a successful referendum on divorce, and the far-left Trotskyist Proletarian Democracy.

== Electoral system ==
The pure party-list proportional representation had traditionally become the electoral system for the Chamber of Deputies. Italian provinces were united in 32 constituencies, each electing a group of candidates. At constituency level, seats were divided between open lists using the largest remainder method with Imperiali quota. Remaining votes and seats were transferred at the national level, where they were divided using the Hare quota, and automatically distributed to best losers into the local lists.

For the Senate, 237 single-seat constituencies were established. Candidates could be elected in such constituencies by winning a supermajority of votes. The only candidates elected this way were German minority candidates in South Tyrol. All remaining votes and seats were grouped in party lists and regional constituencies, where a D'Hondt method was used: on the lists, candidates with the best percentages were elected.

== Historical background ==
Although the 1970s in Italy was marked by violence, it was also a time of great social and economic progress. Following the civil disturbances of the 1960s, Christian Democracy and its allies in government (including the Socialist Party) introduced a wide range of political, social, and economic reforms. Regional governments were introduced in the spring of 1970, with elected councils provided with the authority to legislate in areas like public works, town planning, social welfare, and health. Spending on the relatively poor South was significantly increased, while new laws relating to index-linked pay, public housing, and pension provision were also passed. In 1975, a law was passed entitling redundant workers to receive at least 80% of their previous salary for up to a year from a state insurance fund. Living standards also continued to rise, with wages going up by an average of about 25% a year from the early 1970s onwards, and between 1969 and 1978, average real wages rose by 72%. Various fringe benefits were raised to the extent that they amounted to an additional 50% to 60% on wages, the highest in any country in the Western world. In addition, working hours were reduced so that by the end of the decade they were lower than any other country apart from Belgium. Some categories of workers who were laid off received generous unemployment compensation which represented only a little less than full wages, often years beyond eligibility. Initially, these benefits were primarily enjoyed by industrial workers in northern Italy where the “Hot Autumn” had its greatest impact, but these benefits soon spread to other categories of workers in other areas. In 1975, the escalator clause was strengthened in wage contracts, providing a high proportion of workers with nearly 100% indexation, with quarterly revisions, thereby increasing wages nearly as fast as prices.

A statute of worker’s rights that was drafted and pushed into enactment in 1970 by the Socialist Labour minister Giacomo Brodolini, greatly strengthened the authority of the trade unions in the factories, outlawed dismissal without just cause, guaranteed freedom of assembly and speech on the shop floor, forbade employers to keep records of the union or political affiliations of their workers, and prohibited hiring except through the state employment office.

In 1973, the Italian Communist Party's General Secretary Enrico Berlinguer launched a proposal for a "democratic alliance" with the Christian Democracy, embraced by Aldo Moro. This alliance was inspired by the Allende Government in Chile, that was composed by a left-wing coalition Popular Unity and supported by the Christian Democratic Party. After the Chilean coup of the same year, there was an approach between PCI and DC, that became a political alliance in 1976. In this time, the Berlinguer's PCI attempted to distance his party from the USSR, with the launch of "Eurocommunism" along with the Spanish Communist Party and the French Communist Party.

In July 1975, a Christian leftist, Benigno Zaccagnini, became the new Secretary of Christian Democracy.

== Parties and leaders ==
Party	Ideology	Leader	Seats in 1972		
Party	Ideology	Leader	C	S	Total
Christian Democracy (DC)	Christian democracy	Benigno Zaccagnini	266	135	401
Italian Communist Party (PCI)	Eurocommunism	Enrico Berlinguer	179	94	273
Italian Socialist Party (PSI)	Democratic socialism	Francesco De Martino	61	33	94
Italian Social Movement (MSI)	Neo-fascism	Giorgio Almirante	56	26	82
Italian Democratic Socialist Party (PSDI)	Social democracy	Pier Luigi Romita	29	11	40
Italian Liberal Party (PLI)	Conservative liberalism	Valerio Zanone	21	8	29
Italian Republican Party (PRI)	Liberalism	Oddo Biasini	15	5	20
Radical Party (PR)	Radicalism	Marco Pannella	Did not contest		
Proletarian Democracy (DP)	Trotskyism	Mario Capanna	New		

== Results ==
Faced with the rise of the PCI, many centrist politicians and businessmen began to think how to avoid the possibility of a Communist victory that could turn Italy into a Soviet-aligned State. The DC leadership thought to gradually involve the Communists in governmental policies so as to moderate their aims, as had been done with the Socialists previously. The man who was chosen to lead this attempt did not belong to the leftist wing of the DC, as had happened with the PSI moderation effort, but the moderate leader and former-PM Giulio Andreotti, so as to balance the situation and calm the markets. The first government reliant on support from the communists was thus formed, when the PCI decided to grant its external support. However this process, called National Solidarity, was dramatically ended by the terrorist attacks of the Red Brigades, which saw the kidnapping and murder of former-PM Aldo Moro. The country was shocked by these killings, and the Communists returned to full opposition. Giulio Andreotti's subsequent attempt to form a classic centre-left government with the Socialists failed, and a new general election was called for 1979.

=== Chamber of Deputies ===
← Summary of the 20 June 1976 Chamber of Deputies election results →
Party	Votes	%	Seats	+/−
Christian Democracy (DC)	14,209,519	38.71	262	−4
Italian Communist Party (PCI)	12,614,650	34.37	228	+49
Italian Socialist Party (PSI)	3,540,309	9.64	57	−4
Italian Social Movement (MSI)	2,238,339	6.10	35	−21
Italian Democratic Socialist Party (PSDI)	1,239,492	3.38	15	−14
Italian Republican Party (PRI)	1,135,546	3.09	14	−1
Proletarian Democracy (DP)	557,025	1.52	6	New
Italian Liberal Party (PLI)	480,122	1.31	5	−15
Radical Party (PR)	394,439	1.07	4	New
South Tyrolean People's Party (SVP)	184,375	0.50	3	±0
PCI – PSI – PdUP	26,748	0.07	1	±0
Others	87,014	0.24	0	±0
Invalid/blank votes	1,045,512	–	–	–
Total	37,755,090	100	630	±0
Registered voters/turnout	40,426,658	93.39	–	–
Source: Ministry of the Interior

Popular vote
DC	38.71%
PCI	34.37%
PSI	9.64%
MSI-DN	6.10%
PSDI	3.38%
PRI	3.09%
DP	1.52%
PLI	1.31%
PR	1.07%
Others	0.81%

Seats
DC	41.59%
PCI	36.19%
PSI	9.05%
MSI-DN	5.56%
PSDI	2.38%
PRI	2.22%
DP	0.95%
PLI	0.79%
PR	0.63%
Others	0.63%

==== Results by constituency ====
Constituency	Total seats	Seats won									
Constituency	Total seats	DC	PCI	PSI	MSI-DN	PSDI	PRI	DP	PLI	PR	Others
Turin	38	13	15	4	1	1	1	1	1	1	
Cuneo	16	7	5	1		1	1		1		
Genoa	22	8	9	2	1		1			1	
Milan	52	19	19	6	2	1	2	1	1	1	
Como	19	9	5	2	1		1	1			
Brescia	21	12	5	2	1			1			
Mantua	8	4	3	1							
Trentino	9	4	1	1							3
Verona	28	16	6	3	1	1	1				
Venice	16	8	5	2		1					
Udine	13	6	4	2		1					
Bologna	27	7	14	2	1	1	2				
Parma	19	6	10	2		1					
Florence	15	5	9	1							
Pisa	14	6	7	1							
Siena	9	3	5	1							
Ancona	16	7	7	1	1						
Perugia	12	4	6	1	1						
Rome	55	19	20	4	5	2	2	1	1	1	
L'Aquila	14	7	5	1	1						
Campobasso	4	3	1								
Naples	39	15	14	3	4	1	1	1			
Benevento	18	9	5	1	2	1					
Bari	23	10	8	2	2	1					
Lecce	18	8	6	2	2						
Potenza	8	4	3	1							
Catanzaro	23	10	8	3	2						
Catania	29	12	8	2	4	1	1		1		
Palermo	25	12	7	2	2	1	1				
Cagliari	16	7	7	1	1						
Aosta Valley	1										1
Trieste	3	2	1								
Total	630	262	228	57	35	15	14	6	5	4	4

=== Senate of the Republic ===
← Summary of the 20 June 1976 Senate of the Republic election results →
Party	Votes	%	Seats	+/−
Christian Democracy (DC)	12,227,353	38.88	135	±0
Italian Communist Party (PCI)	10,637,772	33.83	116	+22
Italian Socialist Party (PSI)	3,208,164	10.20	29	−4
Italian Social Movement (MSI)	2,086,430	6.63	15	−11
Italian Democratic Socialist Party (PSDI)	974,940	3.10	6	−5
Italian Republican Party (PRI)	846,415	2.69	6	+1
Italian Liberal Party (PLI)	438,265	1.39	2	−6
PLI – PRI – PSDI	334,898	1.06	2	±0
Radical Party (PR)	265,947	0.85	0	New
South Tyrolean People's Party (SVP)	158,584	0.50	2	±0
Proletarian Democracy (DP)	78,170	0.25	0	New
PCI – PSI	52,922	0.17	1	+1
PLI – PRI	51,353	0.16	0	±0
DC – RV – UV – UVP – PRI	22,917	0.07	1	±0
Others	65,301	0.22	0	±0
Invalid/blank votes	1,888,027	–	–	–
Total	32,621,581	100	315	±0
Registered voters/turnout	34,928,214	93.4	–	–
Source: Ministry of the Interior

Popular vote
DC	38.88%
PCI	33.83%
PSI	10.20%
MSI	6.63%
PSDI	3.10%
PRI	2.69%
PLI	1.39%
Others	3.28%

Seats
DC	42.86%
PCI	36.83%
PSI	9.21%
MSI	4.76%
PSDI	1.90%
PRI	1.90%
PLI	0.63%
Others	1.90%

==== Results by constituency ====
Constituency	Total seats	Seats won							
Constituency	Total seats	DC	PCI	PSI	MSI	PSDI	PRI	PLI	Others
Piedmont	25	10	9	2	1	1	1	1	
Aosta Valley	1								1
Lombardy	48	21	16	6	2	1	1	1	
Trentino-Alto Adige	7	3	1	1					2
Veneto	23	14	6	2		1			
Friuli-Venezia Giulia	7	4	2	1					
Liguria	10	4	4	1					1
Emilia-Romagna	22	7	12	2			1		
Tuscany	20	7	10	2					1
Umbria	7	2	4	1					
Marche	8	4	4						
Lazio	27	10	10	2	3	1	1		
Abruzzo	7	4	3						
Molise	2	1							1
Campania	29	12	10	2	3	1	1		
Apulia	20	9	7	2	2				
Basilicata	7	3	3	1					
Calabria	11	5	4	1	1				
Sicily	26	11	8	2	3	1	1		
Sardinia	8	4	3	1					
Total	315	135	116	29	15	6	6	2	6

== Maps ==

Seat distribution by constituency for the Chamber of Deputies (left) and Senate (right).

== Foreign involvement ==
The rise of the PCI sparked significant concerns among Italy's NATO allies about a communist government in Italy. Through the Information Research Department (IRD), the British Foreign Office took several measures to prevent a PCI victory, including sending journalists anti-communist lines to use in their articles and circulating forged RIA Novosti pamphlets to bolster claims that the Soviet Union was interfering in the election.
