= Second Craxi government =

43rd government of the Italian Republic

Craxi II Cabinet
- 43rd Cabinet of Italy

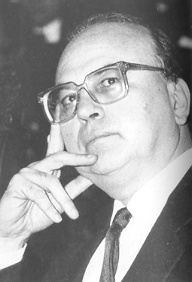
- Date formed: 1 August 1986
- Date dissolved: 18 April 1987

People and organisations
- Head of state: Francesco Cossiga
- Head of government: Bettino Craxi
- Member parties: DC, PSI, PSDI, PRI, PLI
- Status in legislature: Coalition government Pentapartito
- Opposition parties: PCI, MSI, PR, DP

History
- Legislature term: IX Legislature (1983–1987)
- Predecessor: Craxi I Cabinet
- Successor: Fanfani VI Cabinet

The Craxi II Cabinet was the 43rd cabinet of the Italian Republic. It held office from 1986 to 1987.

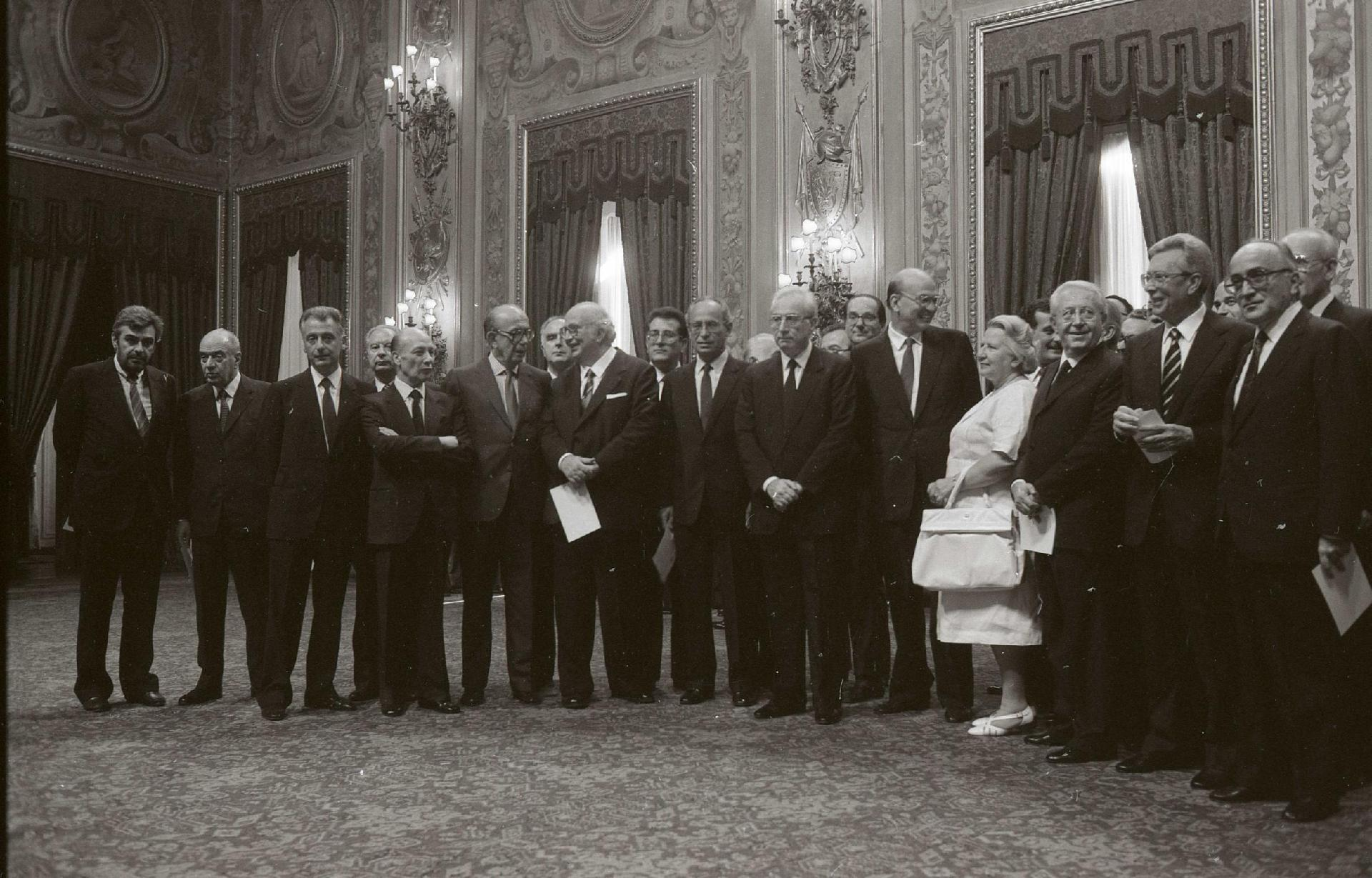
Official photo of the Craxi's government after the oath at the Quirinal Palace

The cabinet, headed for the second time by the socialist leader Bettino Craxi, was supported by the penta-party coalition, composed of Christian Democracy (DC), Italian Socialist Party (PSI), Italian Democratic Socialist Party (PSDI), Italian Republican Party (PRI) and Italian Liberal Party (PLI).

Craxi resigned on 3 March 1987, resignations then confirmed on 9 April.

It was the first time that the Christian Democracy delegation abandoned a government to which it contributed, in a decisive way, to give life.

== Party breakdown ==
- Christian Democracy
16
- Italian Socialist Party
6
- Italian Republican Party
3
- Italian Democratic Socialist Party
3
- Italian Liberal Party
2

=== Ministers and other members ===
- Italian Socialist Party (PSI): prime minister, 5 ministers and 14 undersecretaries
- Christian Democracy (DC): deputy prime minister, 15 ministers and 32 undersecretaries
- Italian Republican Party (PRI): 3 ministers and 6 undersecretaries
- Italian Democratic Socialist Party (PSDI): 3 ministers and 5 undersecretaries
- Italian Liberal Party (PLI): 2 ministers and 4 undersecretaries

== Composition ==
Portrait	Office	Name	Term	Party	Undersecretaries
	Prime Minister	Bettino Craxi	1 August 1986 – 18 April 1987	Italian Socialist Party	Giuliano Amato (PSI)
	Deputy Prime Minister	Arnaldo Forlani	1 August 1986 – 18 April 1987	Christian Democracy	
	Minister of Foreign Affairs	Giulio Andreotti	1 August 1986 – 18 April 1987	Christian Democracy	Susanna Agnelli (PRI); Francesco Cattanei (DC); Bruno Corti (PSDI); Francesco Forte (PSI); Mario Raffaelli (PSI)
	Minister of the Interior	Oscar Luigi Scalfaro	1 August 1986 – 18 April 1987	Christian Democracy	Paolo Barsacchi (PSI); Adriano Ciaffi (DC); Raffaele Costa (PLI); Angelo Pavan (DC); Valdo Spini (PSI)
	Minister of Grace and Justice	Virginio Rognoni	1 August 1986 – 18 April 1987	Christian Democracy	Luciano Bausi (DC); Dante Cioce (PSDI); Salvatore Frasca (PSI)
	Minister of Budget and Economic Planning	Pier Luigi Romita	1 August 1986 – 18 April 1987	Italian Democratic Socialist Party	Alberto Aiardi (DC); Alberto Ciampaglia (PSDI)
	Minister of Finance	Bruno Visentini	1 August 1986 – 18 April 1987	Italian Republican Party	Franco Bortolani (DC); Carlo Merolli (DC); Raffaele Russo (DC); Domenico Susi (PSI)
	Minister of Treasury	Giovanni Goria	1 August 1986 – 18 April 1987	Christian Democracy	Beniamino Finocchiaro (PSI); Carlo Fracanzani (DC); Gianni Ravaglia (PRI); Eugenio Tarabini (DC)
	Minister of Defence	Giovanni Spadolini	1 August 1986 – 18 April 1987	Italian Republican Party	Tommaso Bisagno (DC); Vittorio Olcese (PRI); Giuseppe Pisanu (DC); Silvano Signori (PSI)
	Minister of Public Education	Franca Falcucci	1 August 1986 – 18 April 1987	Christian Democracy	Domenico Amalfitano (DC); Luigi Covatta (PSI); Mario Dal Castello (DC); Giuseppe Fassino (PLI)
	Minister of Public Works	Franco Nicolazzi	1 August 1986 – 18 April 1987	Italian Democratic Socialist Party	Gaetano Gorgoni (PRI); Mario Tassone (DC)
	Minister of Agriculture and Forests	Filippo Maria Pandolfi	1 August 1986 – 18 April 1987	Christian Democracy	Giulio Santarelli (PSI); Mariotto Segni (DC)
	Minister of Transport	Claudio Signorile	1 August 1986 – 18 April 1987	Italian Socialist Party	Niccolò Grassi Bertazzi (DC); Giuseppe Santonastaso (DC)
	Minister of Post and Telecommunications	Antonio Gava	1 August 1986 – 18 April 1987	Christian Democracy	Giuseppe Avellone (DC); Giorgio Bogi (PRI); Giuseppe Demitry (PSI)
	Minister of Industry, Commerce and Craftsmanship	Valerio Zanone	1 August 1986 – 18 April 1987	Italian Liberal Party	Angelo Gaetano Cresco (PSI); Savino Melillo (PLI); Nicola Sanese (DC); Giorgio Santuz (DC)
	Minister of Health	Carlo Donat-Cattin	1 August 1986 – 18 April 1987	Christian Democracy	Paola Cavigliasso (DC); Saverio D'Aquino (PLI); Gualtiero Nepi (DC)
	Minister of Foreign Trade	Rino Formica	1 August 1986 – 18 April 1987	Italian Socialist Party	Gianfranco Rocelli (DC); Alberto Rossi (DC)
	Minister of Merchant Navy	Costante Degan	1 August 1986 – 18 April 1987	Christian Democracy	Silvano Costi (PSDI); Antonino Murmura (DC)
	Minister of State Holdings	Clelio Darida	1 August 1986 – 18 April 1987	Christian Democracy	Delio Meoli (PSI); Angelo Picano (DC)
	Minister of Labour and Social Security	Gianni De Michelis	1 August 1986 – 18 April 1987	Italian Socialist Party	Andrea Borruso (DC); Gianfranco Conti Persini (PSDI); Pietro Mezzapesa (DC)
	Minister of Cultural and Environmental Heritage	Antonino Pietro Gullotti	1 August 1986 – 18 April 1987	Christian Democracy	Giuseppe Galasso (PRI)
	Minister of Tourism and Entertainment	Nicola Capria	1 August 1986 – 18 April 1987	Italian Socialist Party	Luciano Faraguti (DC)
	Minister of the Environment	Francesco De Lorenzo	1 August 1986 – 18 April 1987	Italian Liberal Party	Giorgio Postal (DC)
	Minister of Regional Affairs (without portfolio)	Carlo Vizzini	1 August 1986 – 18 April 1987	Italian Democratic Socialist Party	
	Minister for Coordination of Scientific and Technological Research Initiatives (without portfolio)	Luigi Granelli	1 August 1986 – 18 April 1987	Christian Democracy	
	Minister for the Coordination of Community Policies (without portfolio)	Fabio Fabbri	1 August 1986 – 18 April 1987	Italian Socialist Party	
	Minister for Coordination of Civil Protection (without portfolio)	Giuseppe Zamberletti	1 August 1986 – 18 April 1987	Christian Democracy	
	Minister of Public Function (without portfolio)	Remo Gaspari	1 August 1986 – 18 April 1987	Christian Democracy	
	Minister for Extraordinary Interventions in the South (without portfolio)	Salverino De Vito	1 August 1986 – 18 April 1987	Christian Democracy	Pasquale Lamorte (DC); Nicola Trotta (PSI)
	Minister for Parliamentary Relations (without portfolio)	Oscar Mammì	1 August 1986 – 18 April 1987	Italian Republican Party	
