= First Craxi government =

42nd government of the Italian Republic

Craxi I Cabinet
- 42nd Cabinet of Italy

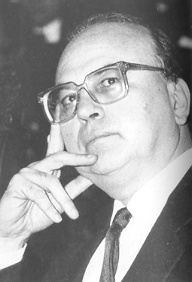
- Date formed: 4 August 1983
- Date dissolved: 1 August 1986

People and organisations
- Head of state: Sandro Pertini; Francesco Cossiga
- Head of government: Bettino Craxi
- Total no. of members: 29 (incl. PM and Deputy PM)
- Member parties: DC, PSI, PSDI, PRI, PLI
- Status in legislature: Coalition government Pentapartito
- Opposition parties: PCI, MSI, PR, DP

History
- Election: 1983 election
- Legislature term: IX Legislature (1983–1987)
- Predecessor: Fanfani V Cabinet
- Successor: Craxi II Cabinet

The Craxi I Cabinet was the cabinet of the Italian government which held office from 4 August 1983 until 1 August 1986, for a total of 1,093 days, or 2 years, 11 months and 28 days.

== Party breakdown ==
- Christian Democracy
16
- Italian Socialist Party
6
- Italian Republican Party
3
- Italian Democratic Socialist Party
3
- Italian Liberal Party
2

=== Ministers and other members ===
- Italian Socialist Party (PSI): prime minister, 5 ministers and 14 undersecretaries
- Christian Democracy (DC): deputy prime minister, 15 ministers and 31 undersecretaries
- Italian Republican Party (PRI): 3 ministers and 6 undersecretaries
- Italian Democratic Socialist Party (PSDI): 3 ministers and 5 undersecretaries
- Italian Liberal Party (PLI): 2 ministers and 4 undersecretaries

== Composition ==
Portrait	Office	Name	Term	Party	Undersecretaries
	Prime Minister	Bettino Craxi	4 August 1983 – 1 August 1986	Italian Socialist Party	Giuliano Amato (PSI)
	Deputy Prime Minister	Arnaldo Forlani	4 August 1983 – 1 August 1986	Christian Democracy	
	Minister of Foreign Affairs	Giulio Andreotti	4 August 1983 – 1 August 1986	Christian Democracy	Susanna Agnelli (PRI); Bruno Corti (PSDI); Mario Fioret (DC); Mario Raffaelli (PSI); Francesco Forte (PSI)
	Minister of the Interior	Oscar Luigi Scalfaro	4 August 1983 – 1 August 1986	Christian Democracy	Paolo Barsacchi (PSI); Adriano Ciaffi (DC); Marino Corder (DC); Raffaele Costa (PLI)
	Minister of Grace and Justice	Mino Martinazzoli	4 August 1983 – 1 August 1986	Christian Democracy	Luciano Bausi (DC); Antonio Carpino (PSI); Cesarino Dante Cioce (PSDI)
	Minister of Budget and Economic Planning	Pietro Longo	4 August 1983 – 13 July 1984	Italian Democratic Socialist Party	Alberto Aiardi (DC); Carlo Vizzini (PSDI) (until 30 July 1984); Alberto Ciampaglia (PSDI) (since 2 August 1984)
	Minister of Budget and Economic Planning	Bettino Craxi (ad interim)	13 July 1984 – 30 July 1984	Italian Socialist Party	Alberto Aiardi (DC); Carlo Vizzini (PSDI) (until 30 July 1984); Alberto Ciampaglia (PSDI) (since 2 August 1984)
	Minister of Budget and Economic Planning	Pier Luigi Romita	30 July 1984 – 1 August 1986	Italian Democratic Socialist Party	Alberto Aiardi (DC); Carlo Vizzini (PSDI) (until 30 July 1984); Alberto Ciampaglia (PSDI) (since 2 August 1984)
	Minister of Finance	Bruno Visentini	4 August 1983 – 1 August 1986	Italian Republican Party	Franco Bortolani (DC); Giuseppe Caroli (DC); Domenico Raffaello Lombardi (DC); Domenico Susi (PSI)
	Minister of Treasury	Giovanni Goria	4 August 1983 – 1 August 1986	Christian Democracy	Carlo Fracanzani (DC); Manfredo Manfredi (DC) (until 25 February 1984); Eugenio Tarabini (DC) (since 6 April 1984); Giovanni Nonne (PSI); Gianni Ravaglia (PRI)
	Minister of Defence	Giovanni Spadolini	4 August 1983 – 1 August 1986	Italian Republican Party	Tommaso Bisagno (DC); Bartolomeo Ciccardini (DC); Vittorio Olcese (PRI); Silvano Signori (PSI)
	Minister of Public Education	Franca Falcucci	4 August 1983 – 1 August 1986	Christian Democracy	Domenico Amalfitano (DC); Mario Dal Castello (DC); Giuseppe Fassino (PLI); Fabio Maravalle (PSI)
	Minister of Public Works	Franco Nicolazzi	4 August 1983 – 1 August 1986	Italian Democratic Socialist Party	Gaetano Gorgoni (PRI); Mario Tassone (DC)
	Minister of Agriculture and Forests	Filippo Maria Pandolfi	4 August 1983 – 1 August 1986	Christian Democracy	Giulio Santarelli (PSI); Giuseppe Zurlo (DC)
	Minister of Transport	Claudio Signorile	4 August 1983 – 1 August 1986	Italian Socialist Party	Niccolò Grassi Bertazzi (DC); Savino Melillo (PLI); Giuseppe Santonastaso (DC)
	Minister of Post and Telecommunications	Antonio Gava	4 August 1983 – 1 August 1986	Christian Democracy	Giuseppe Avellone (DC); Giorgio Bogi (PRI); Giuseppe Reina (PSI)
	Minister of Industry, Commerce and Craftsmanship	Renato Altissimo	4 August 1983 – 1 August 1986	Italian Liberal Party	Bruno Orsini (DC); Nicola Sanese (DC); Sisinio Zito (PSI)
	Minister of Health	Costante Degan	4 August 1983 – 1 August 1986	Christian Democracy	Paola Cavigliasso (DC); Francesco De Lorenzo (PLI); Carlo Romei (DC)
	Minister of Foreign Trade	Nicola Capria	4 August 1983 – 1 August 1986	Italian Socialist Party	Francesco Vittorio Mazzola (DC); Giovanni Prandini (DC)
	Minister of Merchant Navy	Gianuario Carta	4 August 1983 – 1 August 1986	Christian Democracy	Giuseppe Cerami (DC); Alberto Ciampaglia (PSDI) (until 2 August 1984); Silvano Costi (PSDI) (since 2 August 1984)
	Minister of State Holdings	Clelio Darida	4 August 1983 – 1 August 1986	Christian Democracy	Delio Giacometti (DC); Delio Meoli (PSI)
	Minister of Labour and Social Security	Gianni De Michelis	4 August 1983 – 1 August 1986	Italian Socialist Party	Andrea Borruso (DC); Gianfranco Conti Persini (PSDI); Pino Leccisi (DC)
	Minister of Cultural and Environmental Heritage	Antonino Pietro Gullotti	4 August 1983 – 1 August 1986	Christian Democracy	Giuseppe Galasso (PRI)
	Minister of Tourism and Entertainment	Lelio Lagorio	4 August 1983 – 1 August 1986	Italian Socialist Party	
	Minister of Regional Affairs (without portfolio)	Pier Luigi Romita	4 August 1983 – 30 July 1984	Italian Democratic Socialist Party	
	Minister of Regional Affairs (without portfolio)	Carlo Vizzini	30 July 1984 – 1 August 1986	Italian Democratic Socialist Party	
	Minister for Coordination of Scientific and Technological Research Initiatives (without portfolio)	Luigi Granelli	4 August 1983 – 1 August 1986	Christian Democracy	
	Minister for the Coordination of Community Policies (without portfolio)	Francesco Forte	4 August 1983 – 9 May 1985	Italian Socialist Party	
	Minister for the Coordination of Community Policies (without portfolio)	Loris Fortuna	9 May 1985 – 5 December 1985	Italian Socialist Party	
	Minister for Coordination of Civil Protection (without portfolio)	Vincenzo Scotti	4 August 1983 – 26 March 1984	Christian Democracy	
	Minister for Coordination of Civil Protection (without portfolio)	Giuseppe Zamberletti	26 March 1984 – 1 August 1986	Christian Democracy	
	Minister of Ecology (without portfolio)	Alfredo Biondi	4 August 1983 – 31 July 1985	Italian Liberal Party	
	Minister of Ecology (without portfolio)	Valerio Zanone	31 July 1985 – 1 August 1986	Italian Liberal Party	
	Minister of Public Function (without portfolio)	Remo Gaspari	4 August 1983 – 1 August 1986	Christian Democracy	
	Minister for Extraordinary Interventions in the South (without portfolio)	Salverino De Vito	4 August 1983 – 1 August 1986	Christian Democracy	Pasquale Lamorte (DC); Enrico Quaranta (PSI) (until 16 March 1984); Nicola Trotta (PSI) (since 6 April 1984)
	Minister for Parliamentary Relations (without portfolio)	Oscar Mammì	4 August 1983 – 1 August 1986	Italian Republican Party	
