= Ministry of Public Education (Italy) =

Government ministry of Italy

Ministry of Education and Merit– (MIM)
- Ministero della Pubblica Istruzione (MPI – 1861-1929, 1944-2001, 2006-2008); Ministero dell'Istruzione (MI – 2020-2022); Ministero dell'Istruzione e del Merito (from 2022)

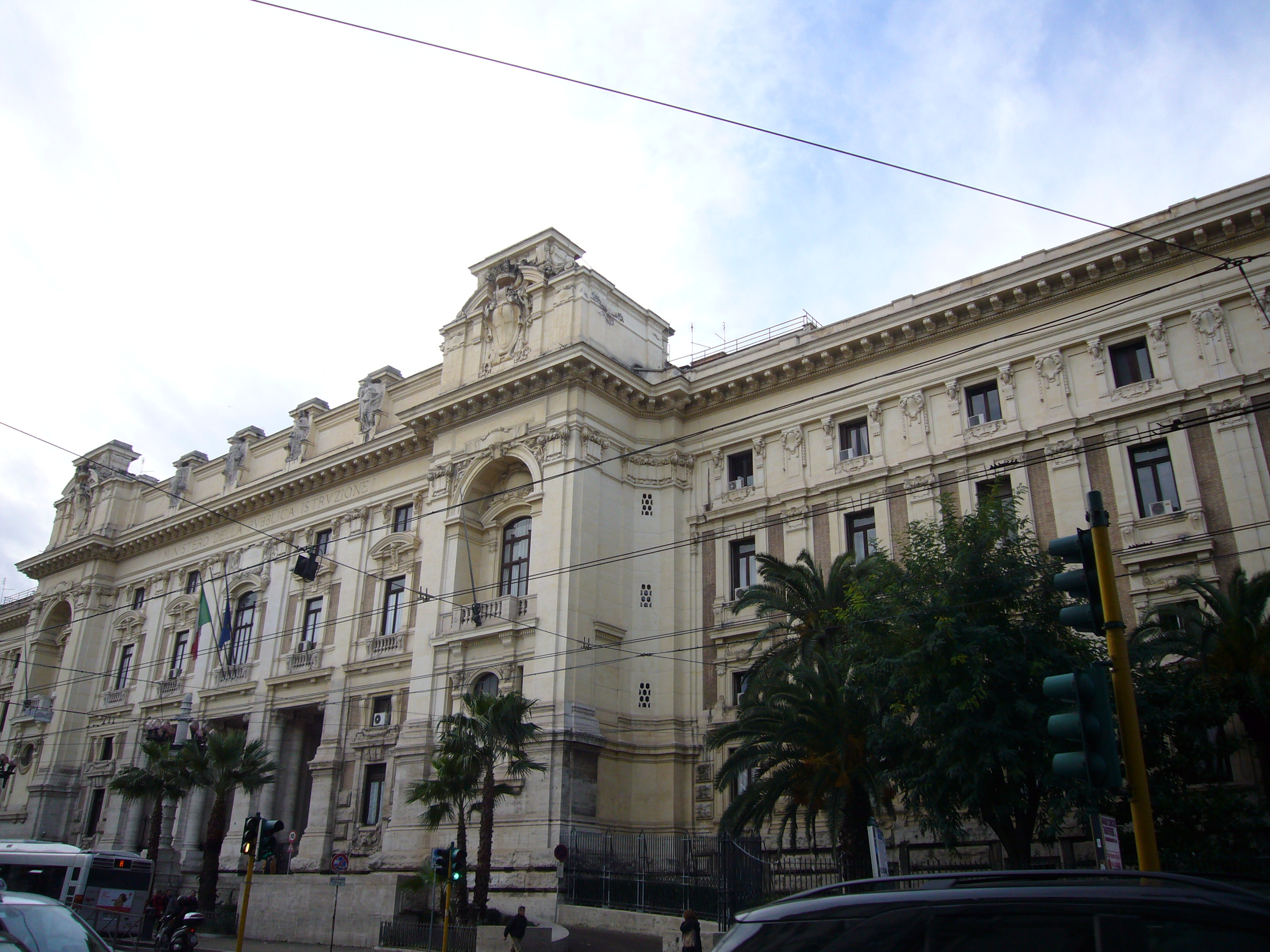
- The Palace of MIM in Trastevere, Rome

Ministry overview
- Formed: 1861
- Preceding Ministry: Ministry of Public Education of the Kingdom of Italy
- Jurisdiction: Council of Ministers of Italy
- Headquarters: Rome, Italy
- Minister responsible: Giuseppe Valditara (League), Minister of Public Education
- Website: www.pubblica.istruzione.it

The Ministry of Education and Merit (Italian: Ministero dell'Istruzione e del Merito, or MIM) is the government body of Italy devoted to the administration of the national education system.

It was active in three separate periods (1861–1929; 1944–2001; 2006–2008), before being merged with the Ministry of Universities and Research to create the Ministry of Education, University and Research.

The two ministries were re-instated in January 2020.

== History ==
Set up in 1861 under the Cavour cabinet, it was suppressed on 12 September 1929 by Benito Mussolini's cabinet, and replaced by the Ministero dell'Educazione Nazionale (Ministry of National Education). This name persisted until 29 May 1944 (i.e. until under the second cabinet of Pietro Badoglio), and the second Ivanoe Bonomi cabinet had it revert to its original name (della Pubblica Istruzione).

It remained unchanged until 14 December 1974, when Giovanni Spadolini (then head of government) created the Ministero per i Beni e le Attività Culturali, which took over responsibilities and functions from this and other ministries. In 1988, the Ministero dell'Università e della Ricerca Scientifica e Tecnologica also subsumed some of the education ministry's responsibilities. In the first Romano Prodi cabinet the two were merged into the Ministero della Pubblica Istruzione, Università, Ricerca Scientifica e Tecnologica, then the Ministero dell'istruzione, dell'università e della ricerca (MIUR) in the second and third Silvio Berlusconi cabinets. The two were re-separated in the second Prodi cabinet of 17 May 2006, but then re-merged in the fourth Berlusconi cabinet of 7 May 2008.

== Organization ==
At its end in 2007, the Ministry consisted of (2007):

- Uffici per la diretta collaborazione del Ministro
- Dipartimento per l'Istruzione
  - D.G. Affari internazionali
  - D.G. Istruzione post-secondaria
  - D.G. Ordinamenti scolastici
  - D.G. Personale della scuola
  - D.G. Studente
- Dipartimento per la programmazione
  - D.G. Comunicazione
  - D.G. Politica finanziaria e bilancio
  - D.G. Risorse umane
  - D.G. Sistemi informativi
  - D.G. Studi e programmazione

== Ministers since 1946 ==
Name	Period	Cabinet
Ministro della Pubblica Istruzione
Guido Gonella (DC)	13 July 1946 – 28 January 1947	De Gasperi II Cabinet
Guido Gonella (DC)	2 February 1947 – 31 May 1947	De Gasperi III Cabinet
Guido Gonella (DC)	31 May 1947 – 23 May 1948	De Gasperi IV Cabinet
Guido Gonella (DC)	23 May 1948 – 14 January 1950	De Gasperi V Cabinet
Guido Gonella (DC)	27 January 1950 – 19 July 1951	De Gasperi VI Cabinet
Antonio Segni (DC)	26 July 1951 – 7 July 1953	De Gasperi VII Cabinet
Giuseppe Bettiol (DC)	16 July 1953 – 2 August 1953	De Gasperi VIII Cabinet
Antonio Segni (DC)	17 August 1953 – 12 January 1954	Pella Cabinet
Egidio Tosato (DC)	18 January 1954 – 8 February 1954	Fanfani I Cabinet
Gaetano Martino (PLI) Giuseppe Ermini	10 February 1954 – 19 September 1954 19 September 1954 – 2 July 1955	Scelba Cabinet
Paolo Rossi (PSDI)	6 July 1955 – 15 May 1957	Segni I Cabinet
Aldo Moro (DC)	19 May 1957 – 1 July 1958	Zoli Cabinet
Aldo Moro (DC)	1 July 1958 – 15 February 1959	Fanfani II Cabinet
Giuseppe Medici (DC)	15 February 1959 – 23 March 1960	Segni II Cabinet
Giuseppe Medici (DC)	25 March 1960 – 26 July 1960	Tambroni Cabinet
Giacinto Bosco (DC)	26 July 1960 – 21 February 1962	Fanfani III Cabinet
Luigi Gui (DC)	21 February 1962 – 21 June 1963	Fanfani IV Cabinet
Luigi Gui (DC)	21 June 1963 – 4 December 1963	Leone I Cabinet
Luigi Gui (DC)	4 December 1963 – 22 July 1964	Moro I Cabinet
Luigi Gui (DC)	22 July 1964 – 23 February 1966	Moro II Cabinet
Luigi Gui (DC)	23 February 1966 – 24 June 1968	Moro III Cabinet
Giovanni Battista Scaglia (DC)	24 June 1968 – 12 December 1968	Leone II Cabinet
Fiorentino Sullo (DC) Mario Ferrari Aggradi	12 December 1968 – 24 February 1969 24 February 1969 – 5 August 1969	Rumor I Cabinet
Mario Ferrari Aggradi (DC)	5 August 1969 – 23 March 1970	Rumor II Cabinet
Riccardo Misasi (DC)	27 March 1970 – 6 August 1970	Rumor III Cabinet
Riccardo Misasi (DC)	6 August 1970 – 17 February 1972	Colombo Cabinet
Riccardo Misasi (DC)	17 February 1972 – 26 June 1972	Andreotti I Cabinet
Oscar Luigi Scalfaro (DC)	26 July 1972 – 7 July 1973	Andreotti II Cabinet
Franco Maria Malfatti (DC)	7 July 1973 – 14 March 1974	Rumor IV Cabinet
Franco Maria Malfatti (DC)	14 March 1974 – 23 November 1974	Rumor V Cabinet
Franco Maria Malfatti (DC)	23 November 1974 – 12 February 1976	Moro IV Cabinet
Franco Maria Malfatti (DC)	12 February 1976 – 29 July 1976	Moro V Cabinet
Franco Maria Malfatti (DC)	29 July 1976 – 11 March 1978	Andreotti III Cabinet
Mario Pedini (DC)	11 March 1978 – 20 March 1979	Andreotti IV Cabinet
Giovanni Spadolini (PRI)	20 March 1979 – 4 August 1979	Andreotti V Cabinet
Salvatore Valitutti (PLI)	4 August 1979 – 4 April 1980	Cossiga I Cabinet
Adolfo Sarti (DC)	4 April 1980 – 18 October 1980	Cossiga II Cabinet
Guido Bodrato (DC)	18 October 1980 – 26 June 1981	Forlani Cabinet
Guido Bodrato (DC)	28 June 1981 – 23 August 1982	Spadolini I Cabinet
Guido Bodrato (DC)	23 August 1982 – 1 December 1982	Spadolini II Cabinet
Franca Falcucci (DC)	1 December 1982 – 4 August 1983	Fanfani V Cabinet
Franca Falcucci (DC)	4 August 1983 – 1 August 1986	Craxi I Cabinet
Franca Falcucci (DC)	1 August 1986 – 17 April 1987	Craxi II Cabinet
Franca Falcucci (DC)	17 April 1987 – 28 July 1987	Fanfani VI Cabinet
Giovanni Galloni (DC)	28 July 1987 – 13 April 1988	Goria Cabinet
Giovanni Galloni (DC)	13 April 1988 – 22 July 1989	De Mita Cabinet
Sergio Mattarella (DC) Gerardo Bianco (DC)	22 July 1989 – 27 July 1990 27 July 1990 – 12 April 1991	Andreotti VI Cabinet
Riccardo Misasi (DC)	12 April 1991 – 28 June 1992	Andreotti VII Cabinet
Rosa Russo Iervolino (DC)	28 June 1992 – 28 April 1993	Amato I Cabinet
Rosa Russo Iervolino (DC)	28 April 1993 – 10 May 1994	Ciampi Cabinet
Francesco D'Onofrio (CCD)	10 May 1994 – 17 January 1995	Berlusconi I Cabinet
Giancarlo Lombardi (independent)	17 January 1995 – 17 May 1996	Dini Cabinet
Luigi Berlinguer (PDS)	17 May 1996 – 21 October 1998	Prodi I Cabinet
Luigi Berlinguer (DS)	21 October 1998 – 22 December 1999	D'Alema I Cabinet
Luigi Berlinguer (DS)	22 December 1999 – 25 April 2000	D'Alema II Cabinet
Tullio De Mauro (independent)	25 April 2000 – 11 June 2001	Amato II Cabinet
Ministro dell'Istruzione, dell'Università e della Ricerca (MIUR)
Letizia Moratti (FI)	11 June 2001 – 23 April 2005	Berlusconi II Cabinet
Letizia Moratti (FI)	23 April 2005 – 17 May 2006	Berlusconi III Cabinet
Ministro della Pubblica Istruzione
Giuseppe Fioroni (PD)	17 May 2006 – 8 May 2008	Prodi II Cabinet
Ministro dell'Istruzione, dell'Università e della Ricerca (MIUR)
Mariastella Gelmini (PdL-FI)	8 May 2008 – 16 November 2011	Berlusconi IV Cabinet
Francesco Profumo (independent)	16 November 2011 – 28 April 2013	Monti Cabinet
Maria Chiara Carrozza (PD)	28 April 2013 – 22 February 2014	Letta Cabinet
Stefania Giannini (SC)	22 February 2014 – 12 December 2016	Renzi Cabinet
Valeria Fedeli (PD)	12 December 2016 – 1 June 2018	Gentiloni Cabinet
Marco Bussetti (independent)	1 June 2018 – 5 September 2019	Conte I Cabinet
Lorenzo Fioramonti (M5S)	5 September 2019 – 25 December 2019	Conte II Cabinet
Ministro dell'Istruzione
Lucia Azzolina (M5S)	10 January 2020 – 13 February 2021	Conte II Cabinet
Patrizio Bianchi (independent)	13 February 2021 – 22 October 2022	Draghi Cabinet
Ministro dell'Istruzione e del Merito
Giuseppe Valditara (Lega)	22 October 2022 – present	Meloni Cabinet

== See also ==
- Ministry of Education, University and Research
- Ministry of University and Research
