= Loris Fortuna =

Italian left-wing politician (1924–1985)

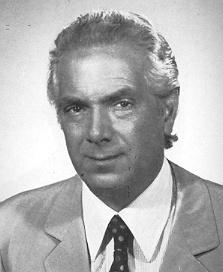

Minister for the Coordination of Community Policies
- In office 31 July 1985 – 5 December 1985
- Prime Minister: Bettino Craxi
- Preceded by: Francesco Forte
- Succeeded by: Fabio Fabbri

Minister for the Coordination of Civil Protection
- In office 1 December 1982 – 4 August 1983
- Prime Minister: Amintore Fanfani
- Preceded by: Giuseppe Zamberletti
- Succeeded by: Vincenzo Scotti

Member of the Chamber of Deputies
- In office 16 May 1963 – 5 December 1985
- Constituency: Udine

Personal details
- Born: 22 January 1924 Breno, Italy
- Died: 5 December 1985 (aged 61) Rome, Italy
- Party: PCI (1946–1956); PSI (1957–1985)
- Other political affiliations: PR (1976–1985)
- Education: University of Bologna
- Profession: Politician, lawyer, journalist

Loris Fortuna (22 January 1924 – 5 December 1985) was an Italian politician who was a member of the Chamber of Deputies from 1963 to 1985 and is best known as an advocate of both civil rights and social rights, and for being among the main promoters of the laws that legalised and decriminalised divorce and abortion in Italy. Born in Breno but raised in Udine, Fortuna was a partisan and member of the Italian resistance movement during World War II. In April 1944, he was captured by the Nazis, tried by a Nazi German court in the Adriatic Coast, and sentenced to forced labour in the Bernau am Chiemsee penitentiary in Upper Bavaria, which he reached in December 1944, and from which he was freed after the war.

In 1946, Fortuna joined the Italian Communist Party (PCI), where he began his political career, working as a journalist by trade and graduating from the University of Bologna. He left the PCI for the Italian Socialist Party (PSI) after the Hungarian Revolution of 1956 was suppressed by the Soviet Red Army, joining a minority but significant group of former PCI members who broke up with the party over the issue. Elected to the Chamber of Deputies in 1963, he was re-elected five times and remained a member of the lower house of the Italian Parliament until 1985. He served as a minister in the fifth Fanfani government and in the first Craxi government, respectively as Minister for the Coordination of Civil Protection from 1982 to 1983 and Minister for the Coordination of Community Policies in 1985.

Fortuna promoted as first signer the divorce law in 1965 but then decided not to submit it to the examination of the Italian Parliament. In 1970, he decided to present his proposal of law, together with the Italian Liberal Party (PLI) deputy Antonio Baslini, gaining support from the PCI, the PSI, the Italian Democratic Socialist Party (PSDI), the Italian Socialist Party of Proletarian Unity (PSIUP), the Italian Republican Party (PRI), and the PLI but opposed by Christian Democracy (DC), which was the ruling party of the First Italian Republic. The Radical Party (PR) and the League for the Institution of Divorce (LID) supported the law outside Parliament. The law, which legalised and regulated divorce in Italy, was then approved on 1 December 1970.

The law on divorce is known as the Fortuna–Baslini Law. The DC tried to repeal it via a national referendum but failed, as the 1974 Italian divorce referendum saw 59.3% of Italians voting in favour of the law on divorce. During the referendum campaign, Fortuna bound up with PR leader Marco Pannella and then joined his party while continuing to be a member of the PSI. The support by the leftist parties, most notably the PCI, was instrumental in preserving the divorce law. Subsequently, Fortuna was a strong supporter and promoter for the abortion law, which was depenalised in 1978 and survived to the 1981 Italian referendum.

== Early life ==
=== Family ===
Fortuna was born in Breno, a comune in the province of Brescia, in the Italian region of Lombardy, on 22 January 1924, the son of Mario and Luigina Dotti. Shortly after his birth, his father became chief clerk at the Udine courthouse and moved there with his family. Fortuna's father later became a representative of the PCI on the National Liberation Committee of Udine.

=== Education and World War II ===
After graduating from the Liceo Classico Jacopo Stellini, Fortuna participated in the liberation struggle as a partisan in the Osoppo and Friuli groups. Following the example of his father, he was part of the Hunters Battalion, later simply called the Student Battalion because it was made up almost exclusively of students, an autonomous resistance group formed in October 1943 and in contact with Candido Grassi (using the pseudonym "Verdi") and Catholic politicians. Its aim was to "fight with arms against the German invaders" and "overcome the apathy of the population, particularly the student body". The group published the mimeographed periodical La Libertà (The Freedom), edited by Arturo Toso, of which six issues were published.

Around mid-April 1944, the group was disbanded when its main members were arrested, and Fortuna (using the pseudonym "Boris") was found in possession of a suitcase of propaganda leaflets and weapons. He was captured by the Nazi military police and imprisoned on 20 April in the prison on Via Barzellini in Gorizia. Tried for "membership of a secret terrorist organisation" and "possession of weapons and ammunition", he was sentenced at the end of October to three years of forced labor, which he served in the Bernau am Chiemsee Nazi concentration camp (prisoner number 7483), where he arrived with the transport number 161 between 17 and 19 December 1944. He was freed after the war was over.

In 1949, Fortuna graduated in Law from the University of Bologna with a thesis on "The Right to Strike and Non-Collaboration" (Diritti di sciopero e non collaborazione). His early career in the legal profession was closely linked to his political activism. For several years, he served as the legal counsel for the Federation of Agricultural Workers and the Chambers of Labour of Udine and Pordenone. During his career, he also worked extensively as a criminal lawyer, appearing before Italy's Supreme Court of Cassation.

== Career ==
=== From city councillor to deputy ===
In 1946, Fortuna joined the PCI and became involved in the agricultural labourers' and wage-earners' movement. From 1946 to 1948, he edited the weekly Lotte e lavoro (Struggles and Work), through which he waged political and cultural battles, sometimes alongside Pier Paolo Pasolini. Fortuna began his political career as a city councillor, a position he held until his resignation from the PCI in 1956 following the events in Hungary. In 1957, he joined the PSI, becoming its provincial secretary. In the 1963 Italian general election, he was elected deputy for the Udine constituency. He soon showed what would become a constant in his parliamentary commitment, championing a series of legislative proposals for the expansion of civil rights and the full implementation of constitutional principles.

In his first legislative proposals, Fortuna proposed, among other things, amendments to the Italian Civil Code regarding labour relations, to the Italian Penal Code regarding the illegal use of child and female labour, to the Italian Code of Criminal Procedure regarding the limits of pre-trial detention, and to the powers and authority of defence counsel to assist and intervene at all stages and levels of the trial. He also proposed a revision of the Italian Military Penal Code during peacetime. All these proposals remained stalled in the Justice Committee of the Chamber of Deputies, and the same fate befell the first divorce bill, presented by Fortuna on 1 October 1965, on "Cases of Dissolution of Marriage" (Casi di scioglimento del matrimonio). This project, which was immediately dubbed a "small divorce", did not meet the political and parliamentary conditions to move forward, although the Justice Committee of the Chamber of Deputies had begun examining it in a referral capacity in June 1967.

In addition to the clear opposition of the DC, Fortuna's initiative encountered resistance from those within the PSI itself who feared compromising the governmental collaboration between the two parties in question. These reasons of political expediency induced the then PSI leader Pietro Nenni to intervene with Fortuna to persuade him to desist from pursuing the bill. Fortuna then supported a public opinion movement calling for the introduction of divorce in Italy. This movement attracted the support of those legally separated citizens who were barred by the law from forming a new family. The demands of separated couples were embraced by the PR, which had no representatives in Parliament, and by the popular weekly ABC, which encouraged its readers to send postcards to persuade the Chambers of Deputies to discuss and approve Fortuna's bill.

=== Divorce and abortion laws ===
Fortuna was instrumental in the rise of the legal divorce movement, which was composed primarily of middle-class members directly interested in the introduction of divorce and largely unrelated to political engagement. To give greater impact to this publicity campaign by Fortuna, PR exponents Mauro Mellini and Pannella announced in early 1996 the formation of the LID. The LID—which included prominent members, in addition to Fortuna himself, as well as several secular figures—was active in promoting numerous demonstrations throughout Italy. By the time it held its first congress in December 1967, the movement had gained considerable leverage in Parliament. Fortuna's popularity had grown at the same pace, as demonstrated by the broad support he received in the 1968 Italian general election, despite the negative results for the PSI party lists. Standing in the Milan–Pavia and Udine–Belluno–Gorizia constituencies, he was elected in both, later opting for the latter.

Strengthened by the increased support, Fortuna reintroduced his bill on 5 June 1968, this time signed, albeit in a personal capacity, by 57 other PSI, PSIUP, PCI, and PRI deputies. On 7 October, Baslini and others introduced a similar bill on "Regulation of Divorce Cases" (Disciplina dei casi di divorzio). The bill's parliamentary process was long and troubled. After consideration by the Justice Committee of the Chamber of Deputies, two reports were presented: one from the majority, which was in favour of the bill, and one from the minority, which opposed it not only on the merit of the law but also because the introduction of divorce was alleged to be unconstitutional on the grounds that it would violate the Lateran Treaty with the Catholic Church. Fortuna's proposal, combined with that of Baslini, was discussed in several sessions between 29 May and 28 November 1969. The preliminary objections of unconstitutionality and numerous amendments aimed at limiting the grounds for requesting dissolution were rejected, and the text was finally approved with amendments and additions. From 18 June to 9 October 1970, the proposal was debated by the Senate of the Republic, which approved it with further amendments, particularly regarding child protection. As customary, the proposal then returned to the Chamber of Deputies, which definitively approved it on 1 December 1970 as Law No. 898.

The divorce law was named after Fortuna and Baslini. Fortuna's political and parliamentary battle was thus crowned with success, and this experience encouraged him to further commit himself to the affirmation of civil rights and the secular nature of the state in an increasingly close partnership with the PR. In early 1971, together with the PR, he founded the Italian League for the Abrogation of the Concordat. He also argued that the referendum should not be applied to a law like the divorce law since it protected minorities; however, a bill he introduced to support that interpretation was rejected. Re-elected as a deputy from Udine in the 1972 Italian general election, he introduced on 11 February 1973 the first bill for the partial decriminalisation of abortion in Italy. After the 13 May 1974 referendum, which upheld the divorce law, a campaign for a referendum to repeal the laws criminalising abortion gained momentum, promoted by the weekly magazine L'Espresso and the League of 13 May. As a result, Fortuna was once again at the forefront of this campaign. On 1 December 1975, when attempts to prevent the referendum were taking place in Parliament, he resigned as deputy in protest. The referendum was postponed due to the early dissolution of Parliament, which also caused his proposal to lapse.

=== Government minister ===
In the 1976 Italian general election, the PR to which Fortuna had joined, thus holding a "double membership", presented its own lists in all constituencies except the one in which Fortuna was running for the PSI, and the PR indicated their vote in his favour. Faced with the PSI's negative electoral result, Fortuna stated that the PSI should remain "in opposition for the next five years to build an alternative together with other left-wing forces". Fortuna, who identified with autonomist positions, was excluded from the new leadership elected by the PSI's central committee, which led to the election of Bettino Craxi as general secretary. During the legislature, he was elected president of the Chamber of Deputies' Industry and Commerce Committee. Re-elected from Udine in the 1979 Italian general election, he served first as vice president of the Chamber of Deputies and then from 1 December 1982 to 29 April 1983 as Minister for Civil Protection in Amintore Fanfani's fifth government.

In the 1983 Italian general election, Fortuna was re-elected from the same constituency. In 1984, he requested some amendments and additions to the law on Italy's cooperation with developing countries and on interventions against world hunger, and also advocated for regulations protecting the dignity of the patient and regulating passive euthanasia. As a result, he introduced a bill on passive euthanasia. On 9 May 1985, Fortuna was appointed by the Craxi government as Minister for the Coordination of Community Policies. Prior to his death, he asked Craxi to establish an electoral alliance between the PSI and the PR. In one of his last interviews, he also talked about initiatives against censorship in Italy that in those years affected films, books, and posters, stating: "One of those civil battles I've been involved in for a long time. If I have one reproach to myself, it's for not having engaged earlier, and more forcefully. I'm against any censorship."

== Personal life and death ==
Fortuna was a member of Freemasonry, which strongly supported the secularisation of the state. He died on 5 December 1985, aged 61, in Rome. He was buried in the memorial chapel of the monumental cemetery of San Vito in Udine.

== Legacy ==
=== Politics ===
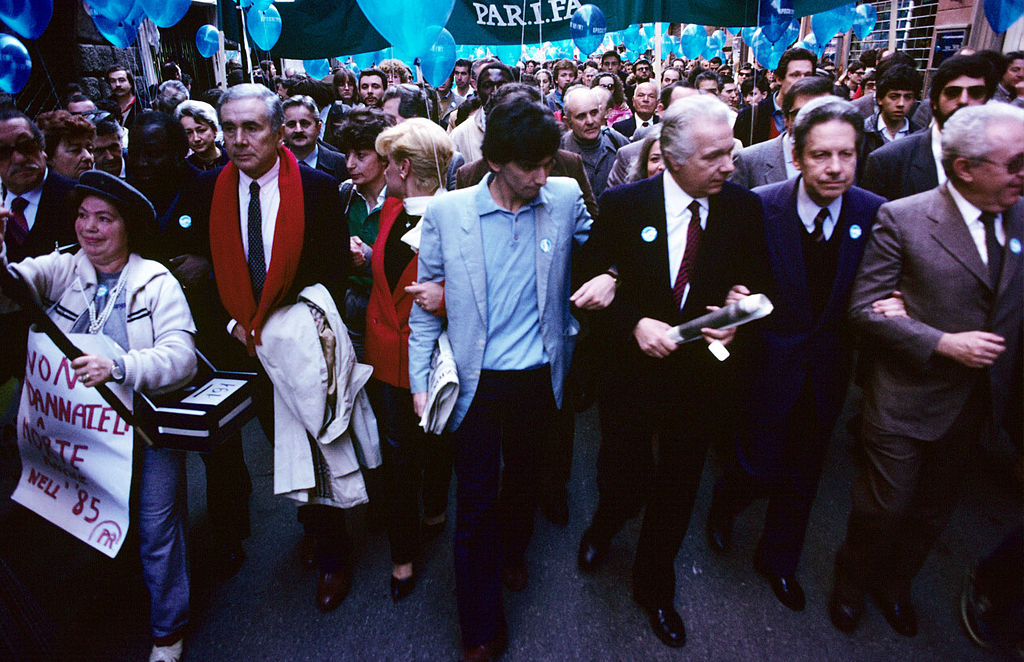
Fortuna at the March for Peace in 1985

Fortuna's political career contributed significantly to the democratisation and secularisation of Italy and its institutions, forming part of a process of expanding individual and collective rights and fighting for the secularity of the state. Fortuna is best remembered for his role in establishing the laws that respectively legalised and decriminalised abortion, and he is memorialised through anniversaries of his birth, death, and the divorce and abortion laws. He was one of the main promoters and symbol of the season of mobilisations and reforms for the expansion of what at that time were beginning to be conceptualised as civil rights. He also had socialist offices opened that hosted overnight the participants of the first anti-militarist marches from Trieste to Aviano.

Fortuna was a supporter of both civil and social rights. During the first reading of the divorce bill in the Chamber of Deputies in 1969, he stated that the battle for individual liberties was closely linked to the social struggle for the emancipation of the lower classes and groups and for the secular nature of the democratic state. He referred to the tradition of Italian socialism, dating back to Filippo Turati and Anna Kuliscioff, which had integrated and transcended human rights within a broader movement that aspired to liberation from all those socioeconomic, political, and cultural factors that impeded "the free development of the personality".

A photograph of Fortuna and Pannella with a sign stating that Pope Paul VI (who opposed the law) had lost and Argentina Marchei ("a commoner, a true Trastevere native, a lifelong member of the Italian Communist Party, elderly, with varicose veins in her calves; for years she had to suffer the humiliating condition of 'public concubinage,' and not be able to name her children after their father") had won (Paolo VI ha perso, Argentina Marchei ha vinto) reflects the historic passage of the law. The other historic photograph was after the referendum promoted by the DC, the neo-fascist Italian Social Movement (MSI), and clerical-Vatican organisations had failed to repeal the law. After the results were announced, thousands of Romans poured into the square, moving towards Porta Pia, where Rome became the capital of Italy, while Fortuna, Pannella, and others were the first to reach it.

Fortuna is mostly memorialised at the local level, especially in Udine. In the prisons of Gorizia, there is a plaque commemorating him. It was there that in the spring and autumn of 1944 he was held prisoner, sentenced to death, and subsequently to three years of forced labour before being taken to a concentration camp. Upon Fortuna's death, his companion Gisella Pagano found his diary, a notebook composed of thin sheets of paper on which he wrote in pencil the events of his days of captivity. In 2005, his name was honoured with the formation of the Rose in the Fist (RnP), an electoral alliance including the PR and the Italian Democratic Socialists (SDI), and openly based on the principles of the then Spanish Prime Minister José Luis Rodríguez Zapatero, British Prime Minister Tony Blair, and Fortuna himself. Pannella compared Fortuna to Blair and Zapatero as an example to follow within the secular-socialist tradition. In retrospect, the lack of success of the RnP, which adopted "Blair-Fortuna-Zapatero" as a slogan, can be seen an unsuccessful attempt to revive Fortuna's figure by an overemphasis placed on civil rights over social rights in a vision of society and political issues that were typical of pre-2008 financial crisis Europe, where issues such as poverty and the welfare state appeared less relevant than they proved in subsequent years.

=== Lack of memorialisation ===
"And yet we're talking about one of those people to whom civilised, democratic Italy owes more than a little: a partisan, a communist until the tragic events in Hungary (he left the party, disgusted), he remained on the left, became a member of the PSI, met Marco Pannella, joined the Radical Party, and, along with Pannella and the liberal Antonio Baslini, was the 'father' of the divorce law (and we must not forget another 'father' of the law: Mauro Mellini); subsequently, the law that allows a woman who wants to terminate her pregnancy to do so in a health facility, without having to endure the trauma of clandestinity and risk her health, bears his name... And yet, how forgotten."

— Il Dubbio, 5 December 2019

One view sees Fortuna's legacy as forgotten in contemporary Italian history textbooks or not worthy remembered, as major Italian cities such as Bologna, Milan, Naples, Rome, and Turin do not have any street in his honour, with only a park in Udine bearing his name as of 2019. According to this view, Fortuna was said to have paid for his "unwaveringly socialist and radical, secular, anticlerical, libertarian" views.

For example, Storia d'Italia 1943-1996 and Storia dell'Italia contemporanea by Paul Ginsborg and Martin Clark only cited the divorce law in a cursory manner, Storia dell'Italia repubblicana by Silvio Lanaro mentioned the law twice without explaining who Fortuna and Baslini were, Aurelio Lepre and Denis Mack Smith do not mention or discuss him in Storia degli italiani nel Novecento and Storia d'Italia dal 1861 al 1997, while L'Italia contemporanea 1943-1998 by Giuseppe Mammarella included four citations but only the last one was about Fortuna. Similarly, in his book about Italy and secularisation (L'Italia dei laici. Lotta politica e cultura dal 1925 al 1980), where one would expect Fortuna to be significantly discussed and featured, Sergio Romano did not cite Fortuna.

In their successful series of volumes (Storia d'Italia) edited by Indro Montanelli and Mario Cervi, the divorce law was described as "an issue of historic significance" in L'Italia degli anni di piombo, while the chapter on the abortion law was hasty, and L'Italia del Novecento by Montanelli and Cervi cited Fortuna in conjunction with Baslini as bearers of the name of law, which "had placed the DC in front of a thorny dilemma: to submit or to fight?"

Fortuna's lack of memory, real or perceived forgotten figure, and general disinterest in his socialist and secular political culture can be explained by the sociopolitical context of the Second Italian Republic, where the centre-right coalition, especially in the 2020s, embraced battles over identity-based issues as Italian Prime Minister Giorgia Meloni described the motto "God, Fatherland, Family" (Dio, Patria, Famiglia) as "the most beautiful manifesto of love that has spanned the centuries". The centre-left coalition also avoided reflecting on the legacy of Fortuna, so much so that during the discussion of the pantheon of the Democratic Party between 2007 and 2008, Fortuna's name did not appear, and he was not discussed during the controversy over recognition of same-sex unions in Italy in the 2010s. Although he was referenced during the Eluana Englaro affair in the late 2000s, Fortuna's rights-based socialism was revived mainly thanks to the cross-party network of former PSI activists and leaders involved in that event, starting with Englaro's father, Beppino Englaro. Another possible explanation is the perceived dualism between civil and social rights, where in the political debate progressive movements are often accused by the right and increasingly by the left of having embraced an ideology of civil rights, abandoning the defence of workers and the most vulnerable social groups, when arguably there is no dichotomy and Fortuna was able to reconcile the two.

== Electoral history ==
Election	House	Constituency	Party	Votes	Result
1963	Chamber of Deputies	Udine–Belluno–Gorizia	PSI	7,120	Elected
1968	Chamber of Deputies	Udine–Belluno–Gorizia	PSI	14,781	Elected
1972	Chamber of Deputies	Udine–Belluno–Gorizia	PSI	16,077	Elected
1976	Chamber of Deputies	Udine–Belluno–Gorizia	PSI	16,549	Elected
1979	Chamber of Deputies	Udine–Belluno–Gorizia	PSI	10,743	Elected
1983	Chamber of Deputies	Udine–Belluno–Gorizia	PSI	11,447	Elected

== Bibliography ==
=== Articles ===
- Cescon, Maurizio (7 December 2009). "Il ricordo di Loris Fortuna, nel nome di diritti e libertà". Messaggero Veneto (in Italian). Archived from the original on 9 March 2016.
- "Fortuna, Blair e Zapatero ispirano la Rosa nel Pugno". Il Gazzettino (in Italian). 7 December 2005. Archived from the original on 7 March 2016.
- "Laico, libero e radicale, Loris Fortuna una vita per i diritti civili". Il Dubbio (in Italian). 5 December 2019. Archived from the original on 25 January 2026.
- Mioni, Michele (9 May 2025). "A quarant'anni dalla morte di Loris Fortuna: tre silenzi ed una considerazione sui diritti civili (e su quelli sociali)". Il Passo Giusto (in Italian). Archived from the original on 10 May 2025.
- "Omaggio a Loris Fortuna. Un incontro a Udine ne ricorda il percorso intellettuale e politico". FriuliSera (in Italian). 1 December 2025. Archived from the original on 17 December 2025.
- Rocchi, Marco (December 2020). "Cinquant'anni di divorzio" (PDF). Avanti! (in Italian). Archived (PDF) from the original on 27 June 2021.

=== Encyclopedias ===
- Sguazzero, Tiziano (2019). "Loris Fortuna". Dizionario biografico dei Friulani. Nuovo Liruti online (in Italian). Archived from the original on 19 May 2019.
- Sircana, Giuseppe (1997). "Fortuna, Loris". Dizionario Biografico degli Italiani (in Italian). Vol. 49. Rome: Italian Encyclopedia Institute. Archived from the original on 13 March 2019.

=== Profile ===
- "Fortuna Loris" (in Italian). National Association of Italian Political Deportees from Nazi Concentration Camps. 6 June 2020. Archived from the original on 1 July 2024.
