= Fifth Fanfani government =

41st government of the Italian Republic

Fanfani V Cabinet
- 41st Cabinet of Italy

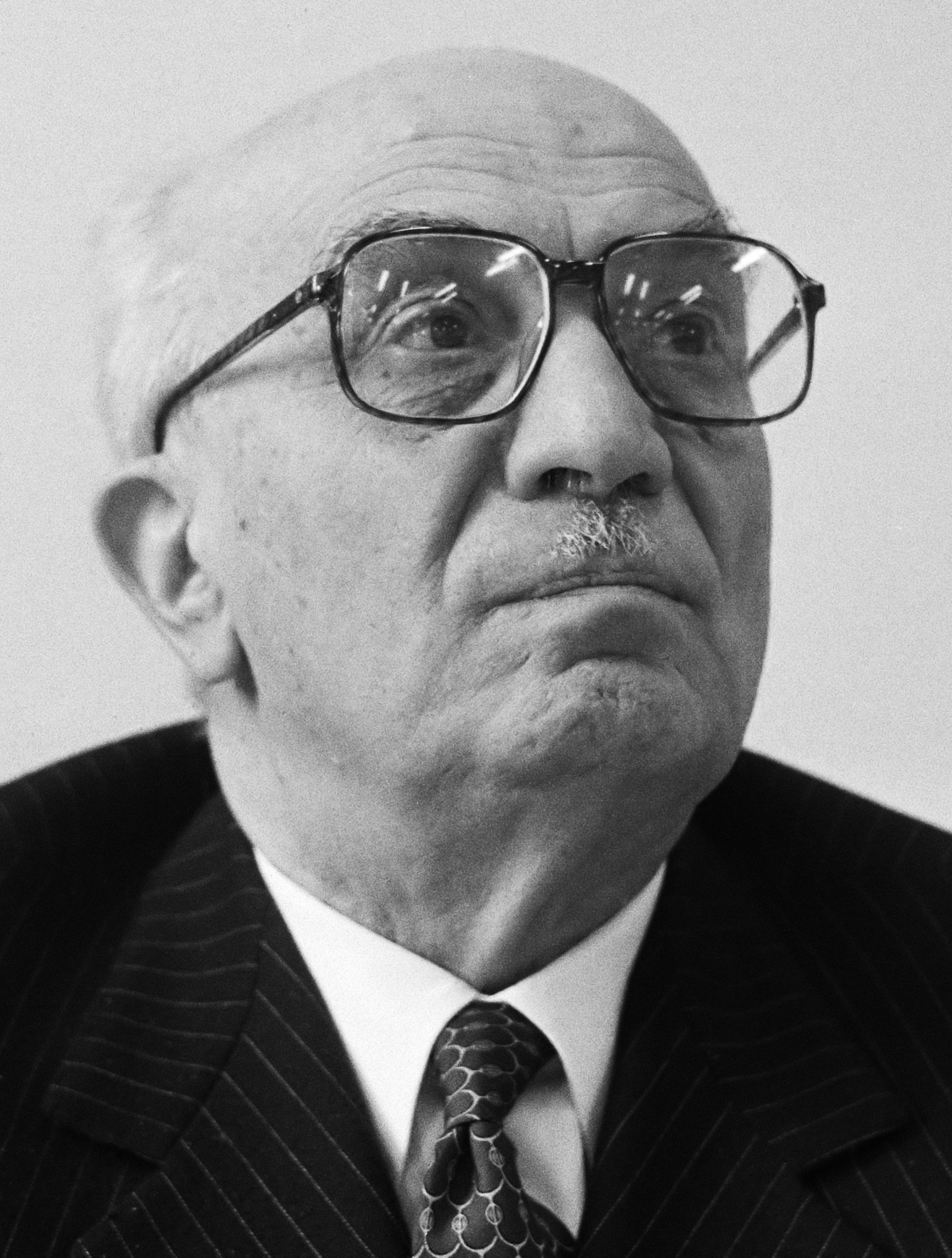
- Date formed: 1 December 1982
- Date dissolved: 4 August 1983

People and organisations
- Head of state: Sandro Pertini
- Head of government: Amintore Fanfani
- Total no. of members: 28 (Prime Minister + 27 Ministers)
- Member parties: DC, PSI, PSDI, PLI; External support: PRI
- Status in legislature: Coalition government
- Opposition parties: PCI, MSI, PR, PdUP

History
- Outgoing election: 1983 election
- Legislature term: VIII Legislature (1979–1983)
- Predecessor: Spadolini II Cabinet
- Successor: Craxi I Cabinet

The Fanfani V Cabinet, led by Amintore Fanfani, was the 41st cabinet of the Italian Republic. It held office from 1982 to 1983.

The government was composed of DC, PSI, PSDI and PLI, with the external support in Parliament of the PRI.

Fanfani resigned on 29 April 1983, when, after months of tense relations in the majority, the Central Committee of the Italian Socialist Party, meeting on 22 April, decided the exit of the party from the government in order to provoke the early dissolution of the Parliament, which was in fact decreed on 4 May 1983.

== Party breakdown ==
- Christian Democracy
14
- Italian Socialist Party
8
- Italian Democratic Socialist Party
4
- Italian Liberal Party
2

=== Ministers and other members ===
- Christian Democracy (DC): Prime minister, 13 ministers and 28 undersecretaries
- Italian Socialist Party (PSI): 8 ministers and 16 undersecretaries
- Italian Democratic Socialist Party (PSDI): 4 ministers and 4 undersecretaries
- Italian Liberal Party (PLI): 2 ministers and 3 undersecretaries

== Composition ==
Portrait	Office	Name	Term	Party	Undersecretaries
	Prime Minister	Amintore Fanfani	1 December 1982 – 4 August 1983	Christian Democracy	Bruno Orsini (DC) (Note: Secretary of the Council of Ministers); Michele Zolla (DC) (Note: With delegation to security services.)
	Minister of Foreign Affairs	Emilio Colombo	1 December 1982 – 4 August 1983	Christian Democracy	Bruno Corti (PSDI); Raffaele Costa (PLI); Mario Fioret (DC); Roberto Palleschi (PSI)
	Minister of the Interior	Virginio Rognoni	1 December 1982 – 4 August 1983	Christian Democracy	Marino Corder (DC); Angelo Maria Sanza (DC); Francesco Spinelli (PSI)
	Minister of Grace and Justice	Clelio Darida	1 December 1982 – 4 August 1983	Christian Democracy	Giuseppe Gargani (DC); Gaetano Scamarcio (PSI)
	Minister of Budget and Economic Planning	Guido Bodrato	1 December 1982 – 4 August 1983	Christian Democracy	Alberto Aiardi (DC)
	Minister of Finance	Francesco Forte	1 December 1982 – 4 August 1983	Italian Socialist Party	Giuseppe Caroli (DC); Antonio Carpino (PSI); Alberto Ciampaglia (PSDI); Paolo Enrico Moro (DC)
	Minister of Treasury	Giovanni Goria	1 December 1982 – 4 August 1983	Christian Democracy	Carlo Fracanzani (DC); Manfredo Manfredi (DC); Giuseppe Pisanu (DC); Angelo Tiraboschi (PSI)
	Minister of Defence	Lelio Lagorio	1 December 1982 – 4 August 1983	Italian Socialist Party	Bartolomeo Ciccardini (DC); Francesco Mazzola (DC); Martino Scovacricchi (PSDI)
	Minister of Public Education	Franca Falcucci	1 December 1982 – 4 August 1983	Christian Democracy	Giuseppe Fassino (PLI); Maria Magnani Noya (PSI); Giorgio Santuz (DC)
	Minister of Public Works	Franco Nicolazzi	1 December 1982 – 4 August 1983	Italian Democratic Socialist Party	Piergiovanni Malvestio (DC); Enrico Quaranta (PSI)
	Minister of Agriculture and Forests	Calogero Mannino	1 December 1982 – 4 August 1983	Christian Democracy	Mario Campagnoli (DC); Fabio Maravalle (PSI)
	Minister of Transport	Mario Casalinuovo	1 December 1982 – 4 August 1983	Italian Socialist Party	Niccolò Grassi Bertazzi (DC); Giuseppe Reina (PSI); Enrico Rizzi (PSI)
	Minister of Post and Telecommunications	Remo Gaspari	1 December 1982 – 4 August 1983	Christian Democracy	Francesco Colucci (PSI); Salvatore Urso (DC)
	Minister of Industry, Commerce and Craftsmanship	Filippo Maria Pandolfi	1 December 1982 – 4 August 1983	Christian Democracy	Giuseppe Avellone (DC); Enrico Novellini (PSI); Francesco Rebecchini (DC)
	Minister of Labour and Social Security	Vincenzo Scotti	1 December 1982 – 4 August 1983	Christian Democracy	Angelo Cresco (PSI); Mario Costa (DC); Pino Leccisi (DC)
	Minister of Foreign Trade	Nicola Capria	1 December 1982 – 4 August 1983	Italian Socialist Party	Edoardo Speranza (DC)
	Minister of Merchant Navy	Michele Di Giesi	1 December 1982 – 4 August 1983	Italian Democratic Socialist Party	Giovanni Nonne (PSI); Francesco Patriarca (DC)
	Minister of State Holdings	Gianni De Michelis	1 December 1982 – 4 August 1983	Italian Socialist Party	Silvestro Ferrari (DC); Delio Giacometti (DC)
	Minister of Health	Renato Altissimo	1 December 1982 – 4 August 1983	Italian Liberal Party	Francesco Quattrone (DC); Mario Raffaelli (PSI)
	Minister of Tourism and Entertainment	Nicola Signorello	1 December 1982 – 4 August 1983	Christian Democracy	
	Minister of Cultural and Environmental Heritage	Nicola Vernola	1 December 1982 – 4 August 1983	Christian Democracy	Francesco Parrino (PSDI)
	Minister for the Coordination of Scientific and Technological Research (without portfolio)	Pier Luigi Romita	1 December 1982 – 4 August 1983	Italian Democratic Socialist Party	
	Minister of Public Function (without portfolio)	Dante Schietroma	1 December 1982 – 4 August 1983	Italian Democratic Socialist Party	
	Minister for Parliamentary Relations (without portfolio)	Lucio Abis	1 December 1982 – 4 August 1983	Christian Democracy	
	Minister for Extraordinary Interventions in the South (without portfolio)	Claudio Signorile	1 December 1982 – 4 August 1983	Italian Socialist Party	Mario Tassone (DC)
	Minister of Regional Affairs (without portfolio)	Fabio Fabbri	1 December 1982 – 4 August 1983	Italian Socialist Party	
	Minister for the Coordination of Community Policies (without portfolio)	Alfredo Biondi	1 December 1982 – 4 August 1983	Italian Liberal Party	
	Minister for the Coordination of Civil Protection (without portfolio)	Loris Fortuna	1 December 1982 – 4 August 1983	Italian Socialist Party	
