= Ministry of University and Research =

Government ministry of Italy

- Ministero dell'università e della ricerca

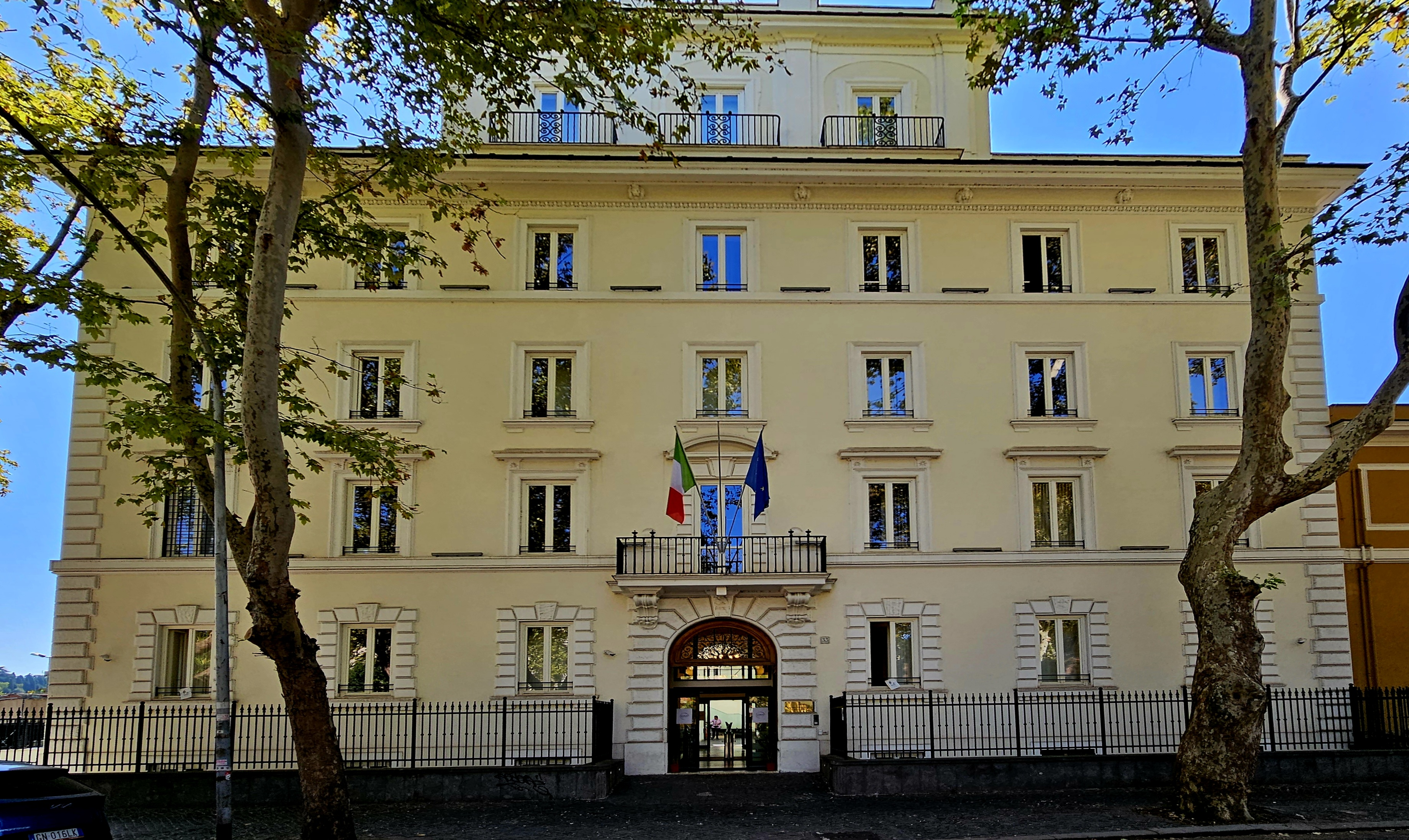
- The Palace of MUR in Trastevere, seat of the ministry

Ministry overview
- Formed: 1988
- Preceding Ministry: Ministry of Education, University and Research
- Jurisdiction: Government of Italy
- Headquarters: Viale delle Mura Portuensi, 33
- Minister responsible: Anna Maria Bernini (Forza Italia (2013))

The Ministry of University and Research (Italian: Ministero dell'università e della ricerca, or MUR) is a ministry of the Italian government. It is responsible for the administration of the university and scientific research and technical progress.

The current minister is Anna Maria Bernini, in office since 22 October 2022.

== See also ==
- Ministry of Education, University and Research
- Ministry of Public Education (Italy)
