= Ministry of Public Instruction =

Ministry of Public Instruction and the leadership post Minister of Public Instruction may refer to historical names of the following government bodies:

- Ministry of National Education (France)
- Ministry of Public Education (Italy)
  - Minister of Public Education (Italy)
- Department of Education (New South Wales)
  - Minister for Education and Early Learning
- Ministry of Education (Spain)
- Ministry of Education (Thailand)
