= President of the Chamber of Deputies (Italy) =

Legislative official in Italy

- Presidente della Camera dei deputati
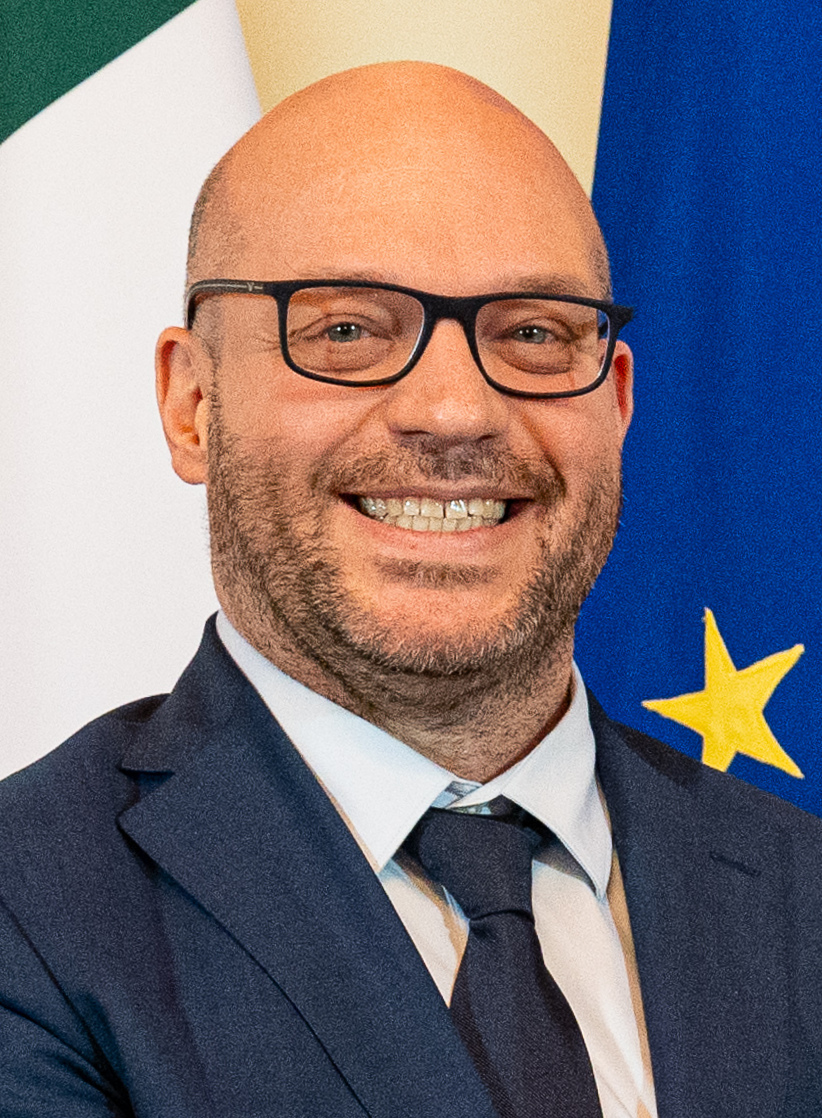
- Incumbent; Lorenzo Fontana since 14 October 2022
- Style: The Honourable (Italian: L'Onorevole); President
- Seat: Palazzo Montecitorio
- Appointer: Chamber of Deputies
- Inaugural holder: Urbano Rattazzi
- Formation: 17 March 1861
- Website: www.camera.it

The president of the Chamber of Deputies (Italian: presidente della Camera dei deputati) is the speaker of the lower house of the Italian Parliament, the Chamber of Deputies. It is the third highest-ranking office of the Italian Republic, after the president of the Republic and the president of the Senate. Since 14 October 2022, the role has been held by Lorenzo Fontana.

== Role ==
The main function of the president is to ensure that the Chamber of Deputies functions correctly, to guarantee the application of the chamber's rules of procedure, and oversee the proper functioning of its administrative apparatus. The President represents the chamber externally. In the house, the president judges the admissibility of evidence, maintains order and directs the discussion. When a bill is proposed in the chamber, the president decides which permanent committee to allocate it to for development (unless the decision is opposed by a parliamentary group leader or a tenth of the deputies, in which case the allocation is decided by a vote of the chamber).

The task of directing sessions of the chamber belongs to the President. To accomplish this, the President can undertake the following disciplinary actions under article 58ff. of the chamber's regulations: calling a deputy to order, ordering a deputy to leave the chamber, and in serious cases, censuring a deputy and suspending them from the chamber for two to fifteen days.

According to article 55 of the Italian Constitution, the President of the Chamber of Deputies presides over joint sessions of the Italian Parliament (which occur only certain circumstances defined by the constitution: electing the President of the Republic and various groups of judges, and impeaching the president). The President of the Chamber of Deputies must also be consulted by the President of the Republic before the dissolution of Parliament (along with the President of the Senate), according to article 88 of the Constitution.

It is the President of the Chamber of Deputies' job to announce call a joint session of Parliament to elect the President of the Republic, thirty days before the deadline (article 85) or fifteen days after the death or dismissal of the previous President of the Republic (article 86).

=== Appointments ===
Along with the President of the Senate, the President of the Chamber of Deputies appoints the members of some important administrative authorities (like the Antitrust Authority), the administrative council of the National Broadcasting Service, and the presiding council of the Court of Audit.

These posts are appointed by the Presidents of the two houses of Parliament because the way that they are elected tends to ensure that they are impartial consensus figures chosen by both the government and at least part of the opposition.

== Selection ==
The President of the Chamber of Deputies is elected by a secret ballot. The chamber's regulations state that the president must be elected by two-thirds of the members of the chamber in the first ballot, or if that fails by a two-thirds majority of voting members of the chamber (excluding abstentions, but including blank ballots) in the second and third ballots, or if that fails by an absolute majority of voting members of the chamber. This election is presided over by one of the vice-presidents of the Chamber of Deputies elected in the previous legislature - whoever was elected first. If no vice-presidents of the previous legislature are present, then the role falls to the vice-presidents of the legislature before that. If none of those are present, then the role falls to the oldest member of the chamber.

== Opposition Presidents ==
From 1976 until 1994, it became conventional for a leader of the largest opposition party to be appointed President of the Chamber of Deputies. The practice began in the context of the Historic Compromise, which saw the main opposition party (the Italian Communist Party) support the government of Giulio Andreotti in exchange for the election of Pietro Ingrao as President of the Chamber of Deputies.

Subsequently, the position was held by another Communist, Nilde Iotti (the first woman to hold the role) from 1979 until 1992. She was succeeded for only a month by Oscar Luigi Scalfaro of the Christian Democracy party, and when he was elected President of the Republic another Communist party member became President of the Chamber, Giorgio Napolitano, who presided over the chamber from 1992 until 1994.

The parliamentary regulations of 1971, in addition to increasing the importance of parliamentary groups also gave the President of the Chamber of Deputies a high symbolic profile. This encouraged a new model of the presidency with a strong legitimate role and wide institutional recognition, which provided the theoretical justification for Ingrao's election. The President of the Chamber had to be a "man of the Constitution", separate from the parliamentary majority and politically neutral (it is not by chance that various Presidents of the Chamber have subsequently been chosen as Presidents of the Republic). The frequent meetings of the President of the Republic and the President of the Chamber of Deputies during the delicate transition of 1992 reflect the development of the role over the preceding two decades. However, this model was never institutionalised and declined with the creation of the majoritarian electoral law, which clashed with consociationalism.

From the first government of Silvio Berlusconi onwards, it became normal for the Presidency of the Chamber of Deputies (and of the Senate) to be given to members of the governing coalition. A change is indicated by the career of Gianfranco Fini, who was elected President of the Chamber of Deputies in 2008 as part of the PdL-Lega Nord coalition, then passed into opposition after the establishment of the Future and Freedom government, and then supported the subsequent Monti Cabinet. In 2013, Laura Boldrini was elected President of the Chamber of Deputies from the centre-left PD-SEL coalition, which had a majority in the chamber at the time; Boldrini continued to stay in office until 2018, although her party (SEL) has been in opposition since 2014.

== Living former presidents of the Chamber of Deputies ==
As of 7 September 2026, there are seven living former presidents of the Chamber of Deputies.

Living former presidents of the Chamber of Deputies

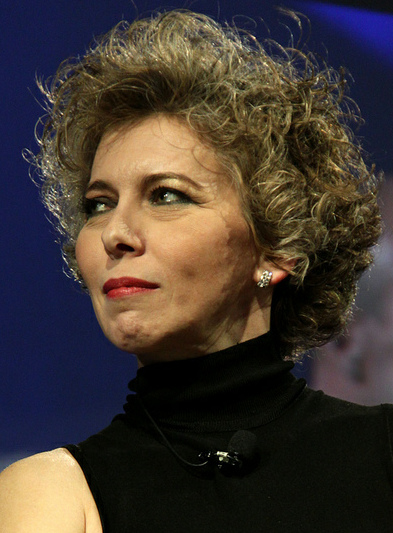
Irene Pivetti
1994–1996
4 April 1963 (age 63)

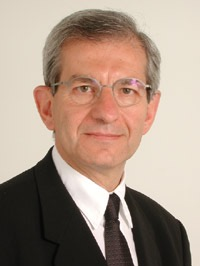
Luciano Violante
1996–2001
25 September 1941 (age 84)

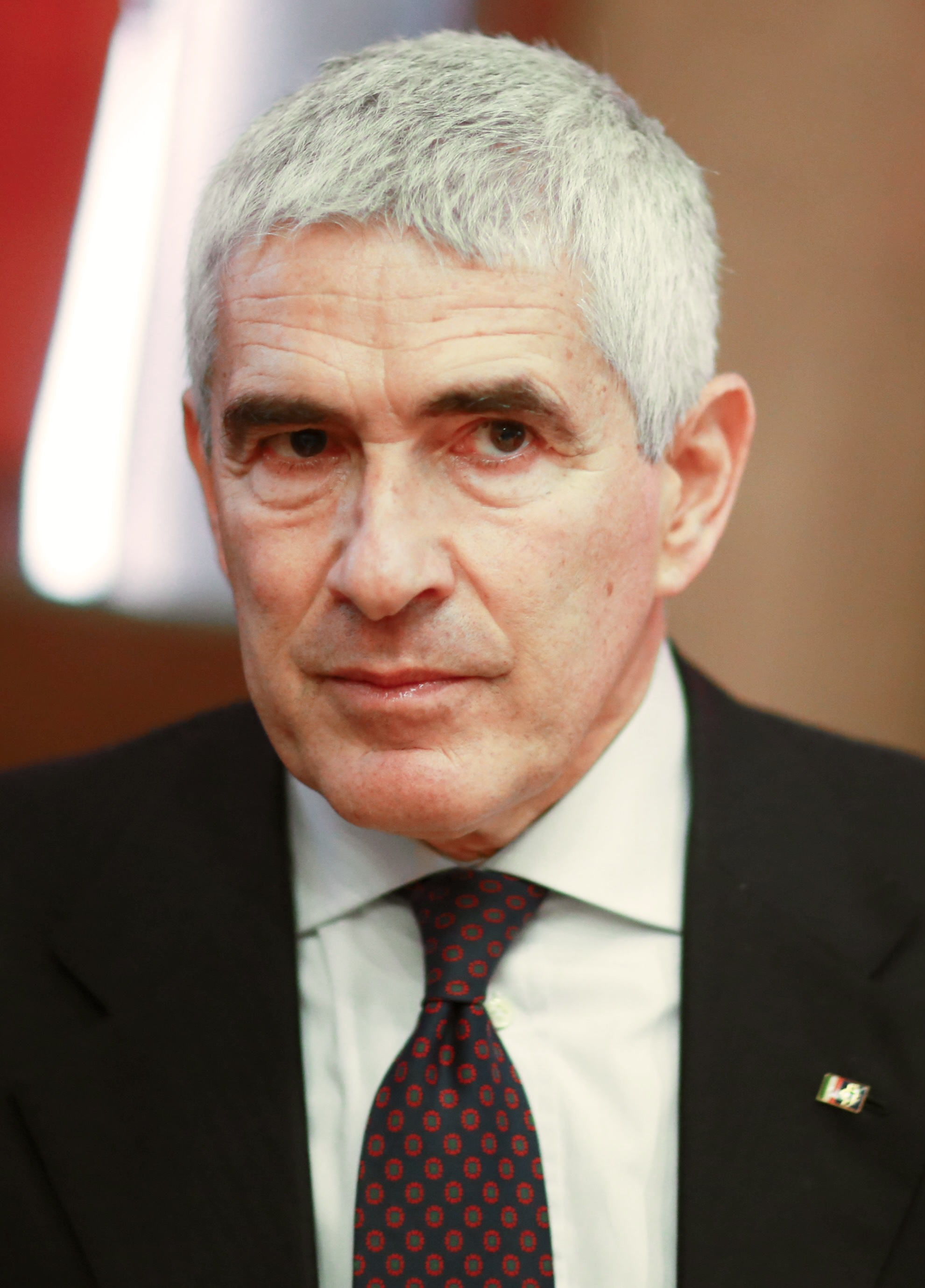
Pier Ferdinando Casini
2001–2006
3 December 1955 (age 70)

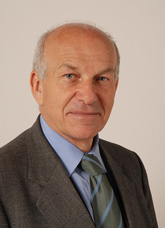
Fausto Bertinotti
2006–2008
22 March 1940 (age 86)

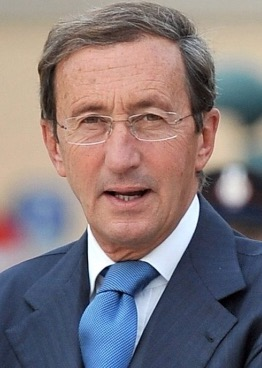
Gianfranco Fini
2008–2013
3 January 1952 (age 74)

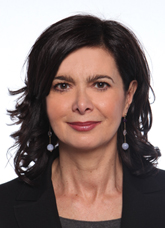
Laura Boldrini
2013–2018
28 April 1961 (age 65)

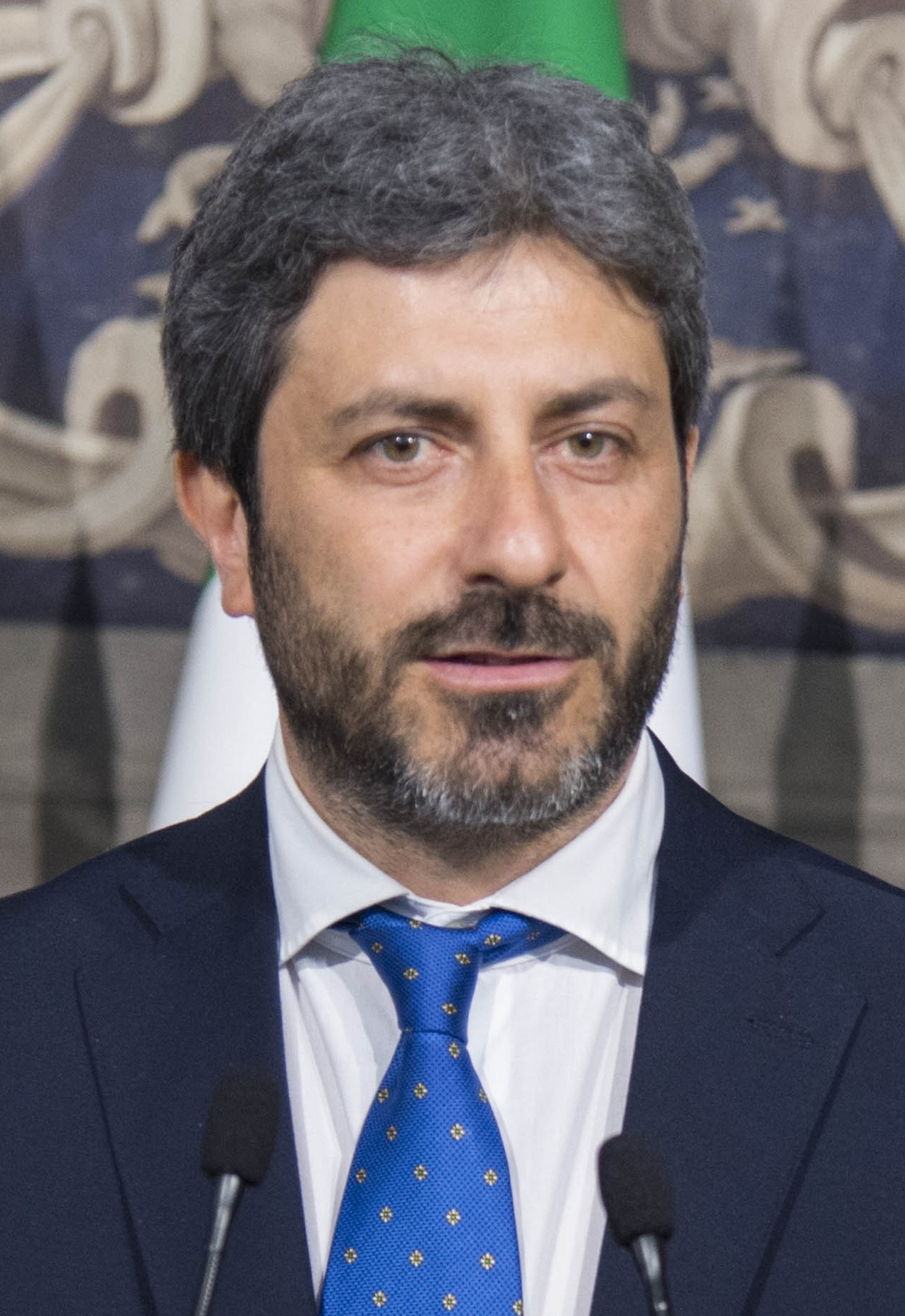
Roberto Fico
2018–2022
10 October 1974 (age 51)

== See also ==
- Chamber of Deputies (Italy)
- Italian Parliament
- Senate of the Republic (Italy)
- List of presidents of the Chamber of Deputies (Italy)
- President of the Senate of the Republic (Italy)
- List of legislatures of the Italian Republic

== Bibliography ==
- AA.VV., I Presidenti di Assemblea parlamentare. Riflessioni su un ruolo in trasformazione, edited by E. Gianfrancesco, N. Lupo and G. Rivosecchi, Il Mulino, Bologna, 2014.
