= Minister for European Affairs (Italy) =

Ministry in the Cabinet of Italy

- Ministro per gli Affari Europei
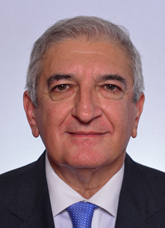
- Incumbent; Tommaso Foti since 2 December 2024
- Department for European Politics
- Member of: Council of Ministers
- Reports to: The prime minister
- Seat: Rome
- Appointer: The president
- Term length: No fixed term
- Formation: 4 April 1980; 46 years ago
- First holder: Vincenzo Scotti
- Website: www.politicheeuropee.gov.it

The minister for European affairs (Italian: ministro per gli affari Europei) in Italy is one of the positions in the Italian government, head of the Department for European Policies.

The current minister for European affairs is Tommaso Foti, of the Brothers of Italy party, who is serving since 2 December 2024.

== List of ministers ==
Parties

- 1981–1994:
  - Christian Democracy
  - Italian Liberal Party
  - Italian Socialist Party
  - Italian Democratic Socialist Party
- 1994–present:
  - Northern League / League
  - Italian People's Party
  - Federation of the Greens
  - United Christian Democrats
  - Italian Republican Party
  - Italian Radicals
  - The People of Freedom
  - Democratic Party
  - Brothers of Italy
  - Independent

Coalitions:

- 1981–1994:
  - Centrist coalition
  - Organic centre-left
  - Pentapartito / Quadripartito
  - Mixed coalition
- 1994–present:
  - Centre-right coalition
  - Centre-left coalition
  - Mixed coalition

Portrait	Name (Born–Died)	Term of office			Party	Government	Ref.
Portrait	Name (Born–Died)	Took office	Left office	Time in office	Party	Government	Ref.
Minister for the Coordination of Community Policies
	Vincenzo Scotti (1933– )	4 April 1980	28 June 1981	1 year, 85 days	Christian Democracy	Cossiga II; Forlani	
	Lucio Abis (1926–2014)	28 June 1981	1 December 1982	1 year, 156 days	Christian Democracy	Spadolini I·II	
	Alfredo Biondi (1928–2020)	1 December 1982	4 August 1983	246 days	Italian Liberal Party	Fanfani V	
	Francesco Forte (1929–2022)	4 August 1983	9 May 1985	1 year, 278 days	Italian Socialist Party	Craxi I	
	Loris Fortuna (1924–1985)	31 July 1985	5 December 1985	127 days	Italian Socialist Party	Craxi I	
	Fabio Fabbri (1933–2024)	1 August 1986	18 April 1987	260 days	Italian Socialist Party	Craxi II	
	Luigi Granelli (1929–1999)	18 April 1987	29 July 1987	92 days	Christian Democracy	Fanfani VI	
	Antonio La Pergola (1931–2007)	29 July 1987	13 April 1988	259 days	Italian Democratic Socialist Party	Goria	
	Pier Luigi Romita (1924–2003)	13 April 1988	28 June 1992	4 years, 76 days	Italian Socialist Party	De Mita; Andreotti VI·VII	
Minister for the Coordination of Community Policies and Regional Affairs
	Raffaele Costa (1936–2026)	28 June 1992	21 February 1993	238 days	Italian Liberal Party	Amato I	
	Gianfranco Ciaurro (1929–2000)	21 February 1993	28 April 1993	66 days	Italian Liberal Party	Amato I	
	Valdo Spini (1946– )	28 April 1993	5 May 1993	7 days	Italian Socialist Party	Ciampi	
	Livio Paladin (1933–2000)	5 May 1993	10 May 1994	1 year, 5 days	Independent	Ciampi	
Minister for the Coordination of European Union Policies
	Domenico Comino (1955– )	10 May 1994	17 January 1995	252 days	Northern League	Berlusconi I	
Office not in use		1995–1998				Dini	
Office not in use		1995–1998				Prodi II	
Minister for the Community Policies
	Enrico Letta (1966– )	21 October 1998	22 December 1999	1 year, 62 days	Italian People's Party	D'Alema I	
	Patrizia Toia (1950– )	22 December 1999	25 April 2000	125 days	Italian People's Party	D'Alema II	
	Gianni Francesco Mattioli (1940–2026)	25 April 2000	11 June 2001	1 year, 47 days	Federation of the Greens	Amato II	
	Rocco Buttiglione (1948– )	11 June 2001	23 April 2005	3 years, 316 days	United Christian Democrats / Union of Christians and Centre Democrats	Berlusconi II	
	Giorgio La Malfa (1939– )	23 April 2005	17 May 2006	1 year, 24 days	Italian Republican Party	Berlusconi III	
	Emma Bonino (1948–2026)	17 May 2006	8 May 2008	1 year, 357 days	Italian Radicals	Prodi II	
Minister of European Policies
	Andrea Ronchi (1955– )	8 May 2008	17 November 2010	2 years, 193 days	The People of Freedom	Berlusconi IV	
	Anna Maria Bernini (1965– )	17 November 2010	16 November 2011	364 days	The People of Freedom	Berlusconi IV	
	Enzo Moavero Milanesi (1954– )	16 November 2011	22 February 2014	2 years, 98 days	Independent / Civic Choice	Monti; Letta	
Office not in use		2014–2018				Renzi; Gentiloni	
Minister for European Affairs
	Paolo Savona (1936–)	1 June 2018	8 March 2019	280 days	Independent	Conte I	
	Giuseppe Conte (1964–) As Prime Minister	8 March 2019	10 July 2019	124 days	Independent	Conte I	
	Lorenzo Fontana (1980–)	10 July 2019	5 September 2019	57 days	League	Conte I	
	Vincenzo Amendola (1973–)	5 September 2019	13 February 2021	1 year, 161 days	Democratic Party	Conte II	
Office not in use		2021–2022				Draghi	
Minister for European Affairs, South and Cohesion Policies
	Raffaele Fitto (1969– )	22 October 2022	30 November 2024	2 years, 39 days	Brothers of Italy	Meloni	
Minister for European Affairs and Cohesion Policies
	Tommaso Foti (1960– )	2 December 2024	Incumbent	1 year, 285 days	Brothers of Italy	Meloni	
