= Lorenzo Fontana =

Italian politician (born 1980)

The Honourable Lorenzo Fontana
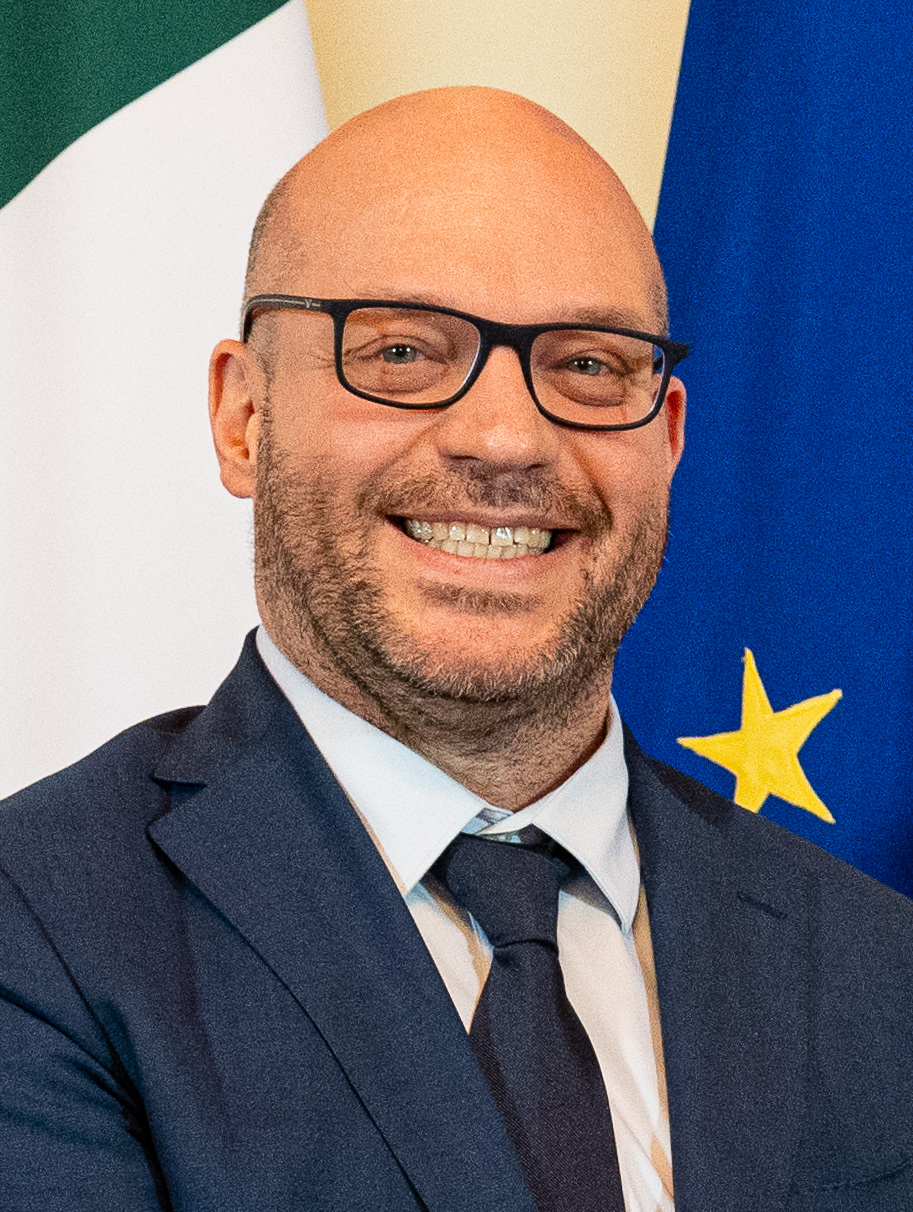
- Fontana in 2024

President of the Chamber of Deputies
- Incumbent
- Assumed office 14 October 2022
- Preceded by: Roberto Fico

Minister of European Affairs
- In office 10 July 2019 – 5 September 2019
- Prime Minister: Giuseppe Conte
- Preceded by: Paolo Savona
- Succeeded by: Vincenzo Amendola

Minister for Family and Disability
- In office 1 June 2018 – 10 July 2019
- Prime Minister: Giuseppe Conte
- Preceded by: Paolo Gentiloni (acting)
- Succeeded by: Alessandra Locatelli

Member of the Chamber of Deputies
- Incumbent
- Assumed office 23 March 2018
- Constituency: Veneto 2 (2018); Verona (2022)

Member of the European Parliament
- In office 14 July 2009 – 22 March 2018
- Constituency: North-East Italy

Personal details
- Born: 10 April 1980 (age 46) Verona, Veneto, Italy
- Party: Lega (2017–present)
- Other political affiliations: Lega Nord (until 2020)
- Spouse: Emilia Caputo
- Children: 1
- Education: University of Padua; European University of Rome; Pontifical University of Saint Thomas Aquinas

Lorenzo Fontana (born 10 April 1980) is an Italian politician and member of the League (Lega), who is serving as President of the Chamber of Deputies since 14 October 2022.

Fontana served as Minister of European Affairs in the Conte I Cabinet. He previously served as Minister of Family and Disability from 1 June 2018 to 10 July 2019, and as Vice-President of the Chamber of Deputies from 29 March to 1 June 2018. He is also the Deputy Federal Secretary of Lega under the leadership of Matteo Salvini.

== Early life ==
Lorenzo Fontana was born in Verona, Veneto, in 1980. He graduated in political science at the University of Padua, in Christian history at the European University of Rome and in philosophy at the Pontifical University of Saint Thomas Aquinas. During the university, he joined the Liga Veneta, the regional branch of Lega Nord (LN), and in 2002 he was elected vice-secretary of the Young Padanians Movement, the League's youth wing.

Fontana is married and has one daughter. He is a traditionalist Catholic and attends the Tridentine Mass. His spiritual counsellor is Father Vilmar Pavesi FSSP who is a monarchist and an opponent of abortion, divorce, euthanasia, and LGBT rights.

== Political career ==
Fontana in 2009

After being elected to Verona city council, he was elected to the European Parliament with 52,136 votes during the 2009 European Parliament election in Italy. In 2012, he was the head of the League's group in the European Parliament. From 2009 to 2014, he was also vice-president of the European Parliament Committee on Culture and Education. During the 8th legislature, he was also the supervisor of the cooperation deal between Bosnia-Herzegovina and Europol. Fontana was re-elected to the 2014 European Parliament election in Italy, gaining 27,240 votes and becoming a member of the European Parliament Committee on Civil Liberties, Justice and Home Affairs (LIBE) and of the Delegation for Relations with Iraq (D–IQ).

On 26 February 2016, he was appointed by Matteo Salvini as Deputy Federal Secretary of the League, a position that he held together with Giancarlo Giorgetti. On 8 July 2017, he became deputy mayor of Verona. At the 2018 Italian general election, Fontana was elected to the Chamber of Deputies for the multi-member constituency of Veneto 2. From April to August 2018, he served as one of the vice-presidents of the Chamber.

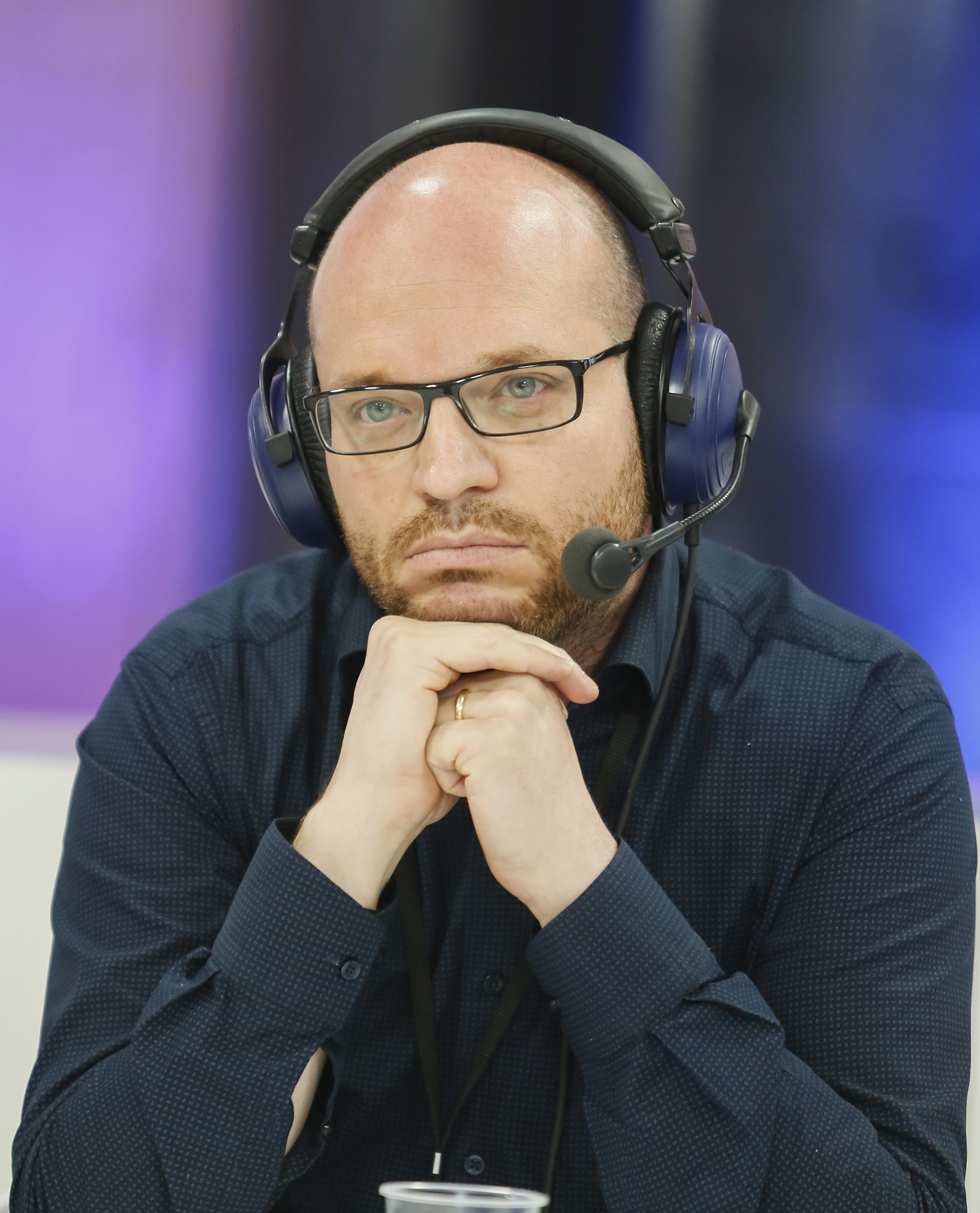
Fontana in 2016

On 1 June 2018, the League and the Five Star Movement (M5S) formed a coalition government led by the independent university professor Giuseppe Conte. The government was sworn in on 5 September 2019. Fontana was appointed Minister of Family and Minister for Disabilities. In August 2018, Fontana called for the repeal of the 1993 Mancino Law, which criminalises hate speech, saying the law was being used by globalists to promote "anti-Italian racism". In March 2019, he helped organize the anti-gay, anti-feminist, and anti-abortion World Congress of Families in Verona, to the point of authorizing the use of the logo of Conte's administrative office in order to promote the event without the prime minister's permission.

On 10 July 2019, Fontana was appointed Italy's Minister of European Affairs. In August 2019, the League filed a motion of no confidence in the coalition government and the cabinet collapsed.

=== President of the Chamber of Deputies ===
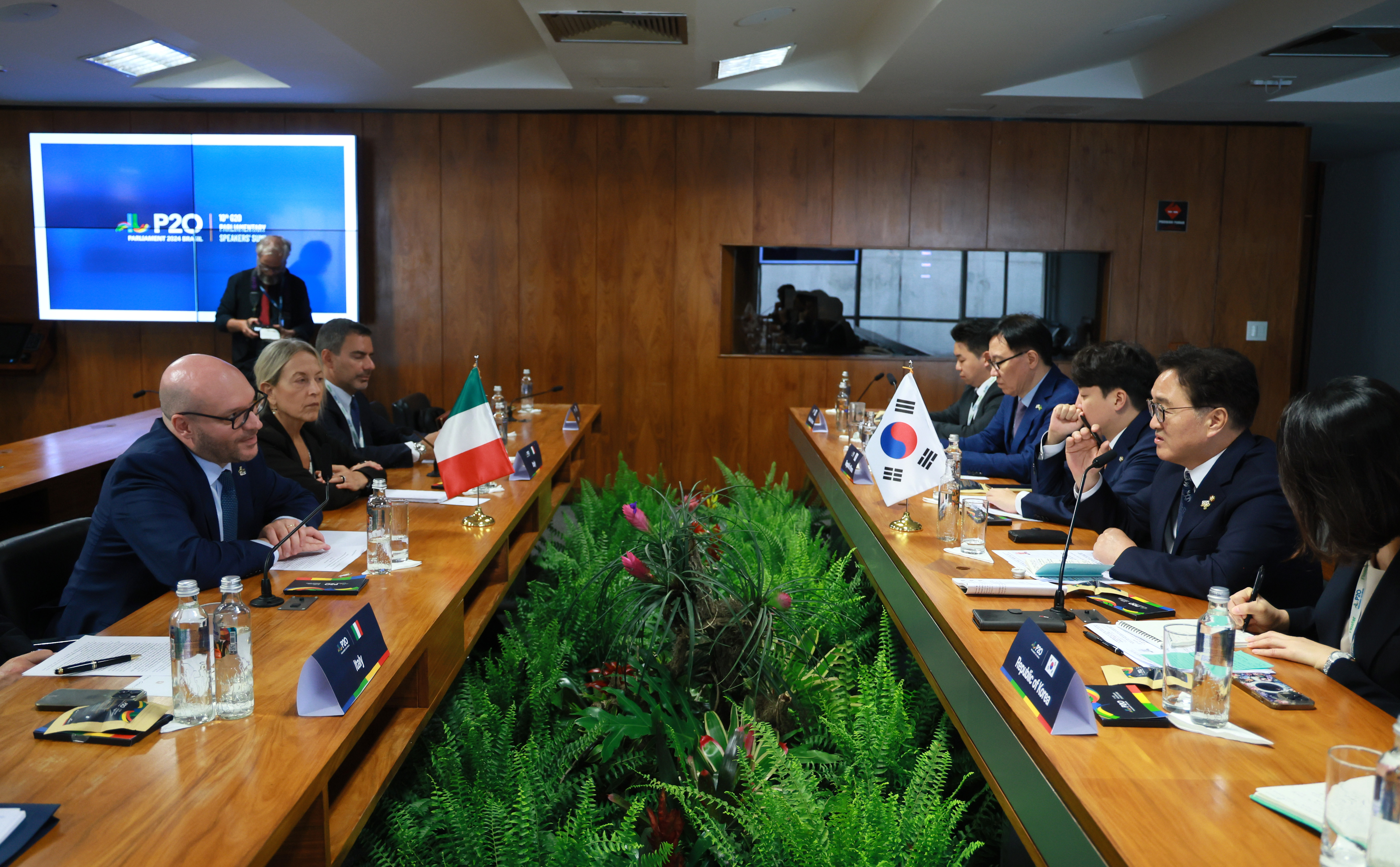
Fontana and South Korean Speaker of the National Assembly Woo Won-shik in 2024, Brazil

After the 2022 Italian general election, which saw a clear victory of the centre-right coalition able of winning an absolute majority both in the Chamber and the Senate of the Republic, Fontana was re-elected to the Chamber for the single-member constituency of Verona, gaining 132,554 votes. On 14 October, Fontana was elected President of the Chamber of Deputies in the fourth round with 222 votes out of 400.

In his inauguration speech, Fontana thanked President Sergio Mattarella and Pope Francis for their role in Italy's life and quoted several Catholic personalities, such as Saint Thomas Aquinas and Blessed Carlo Acutis.

While meeting the President of Verkhovna Rada Stefančuk, he reiterated that the Russian aggression represents a violations an international laws and that the winning of Ukraine means stability for all European countries.

== Political views ==
Lorenzo Fontana in 2011

Fontana is widely considered an ultraconservative. He calls himself a "crusader" who fights against abortion, euthanasia, same-sex civil unions, and stepchild adoption, which he considers as a "weakening of the family". He is also against "pro-LGBT" sexual education, stating that Vladimir Putin's Russia "is the reference for those who believe in a nationalist model of society". Fontana was considered an admirer of Putin until the Russian invasion of Ukraine in 2022. Before the Russian attack, Fontana declared the foreign policy of Lega as totally in favour of NATO, including the sanctions on the Russian Federation. He reiterated that his positions are aligned with NATO and the EU, following the latest voting decisions of the Lega - ID group in the European Parliament. On 2 June 2018, the day after becoming minister, he added that "gay families do not exist", labelling them as "filth". He opposes illegal immigration to Italy, claiming it to be a serious threat that "aims to erase the Italian people along with their communities and traditions", along with "gay marriages and the so-called gender theory in schools".

Fontana speaks in plenary session in 2017

During his life, Fontana has been in touch with far right football supporters' groups in his hometown Verona. In 2016, he welcomed and greeted Golden Dawn, a Greek neo-Nazi party later judged by the Supreme Civil and Criminal Court of Greece as a criminal organization, and he described its members as "fighters", stating that "their contribution will be decisive".

He was a member of the European Parliament when his party entered the European group ENF with Marine Le Pen's Front National. Fontana has been one of the main protagonists of what he defined as the "historical alliance" between Matteo Salvini and Marine Le Pen.

== Honours ==
Vatican City: Knight Grand Cross of the Order of Pope Pius IX

== Works ==
In 2018, Fontana wrote with Ettore Gotti Tedeschi the book The Empty Cradle of Civilization. At the Origin of the Crisis, about the risks related to demographic decline in Italy.

== Electoral history ==
Election	House	Constituency	Party	Votes	Result
2009	European Parliament	North-East Italy	LN	52,136	Elected
2014	European Parliament	North-East Italy	LN	27,240	Elected
2018	Chamber of Deputies	Veneto 2	Lega	– (Note: Elected in a closed list proportional representation system)	Elected
2022	Chamber of Deputies	Veneto 2 – Verona	Lega	132,554	Elected

Political offices
Preceded by Roberto Fico	President of the Italian Chamber of Deputies; 2022–present	Incumbent
Order of precedence
Preceded by Ignazio La Russa as President of the Senate	Order of precedence of Italy; President of the Chamber of Deputies	Succeeded by Giorgia Meloni as Prime Minister
