= Tommaso Bisagno =

Italian academic and politician

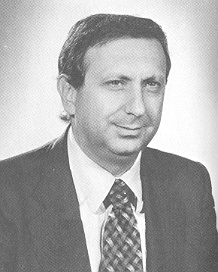
Tommaso Bisagno

Tommaso Bisagno (5 April 1935 – 18 January 2014) was an Italian academic and politician.

== Biography ==
Bisagno was born in Signa in 1935. Graduated in chemistry, he was a university professor by profession. He enrolled in Christian Democracy in 1956. He was a municipal councilor in Signa and a regional councilor in Tuscany. He was elected deputy, for the first time, in 1979 and was re-elected for three other legislatures, keeping the seat in the Chamber until 1994.

He served as undersecretary for defence in the first and second government of Bettino Craxi, in the sixth government of Amintore Fanfani and as undersecretary for public works in the first government of Giuliano Amato.

Elected Mayor of Signa (1990-1995), he was the first Christian Democrat to hold that position. In 2001 he ran for Senate with European Democracy but was not elected.

He died on 18 January 2014 after a long illness, at the age of 79.
