= Silvano Signori =

Italian politician (1929–2003)

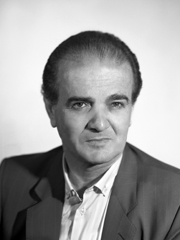

Member of the Senate of the Republic
- In office 25 May 1972 – 22 April 1992

Personal details
- Born: 4 December 1929 Tirli, Castiglione della Pescaia, Province of Grosseto, Kingdom of Italy
- Died: 17 February 2003 (aged 73) Grosseto, Tuscany, Italy
- Party: Italian Socialist Party
- Occupation: Trade unionist

Silvano Signori (4 December 1929 – 17 February 2003) was an Italian politician who served as a Senator for five legislatures (1972–1992) and Undersecretary of State for Defence in the Craxi I and Craxi II Cabinets.
