= Vincenzo Amendola =

Italian politician (born 1973)

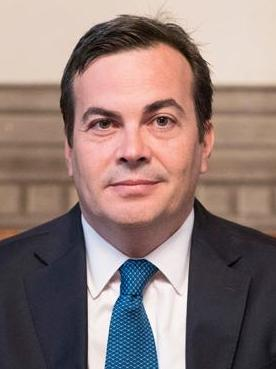

Minister for European Affairs
- In office 5 September 2019 – 13 February 2021
- Prime Minister: Giuseppe Conte
- Preceded by: Lorenzo Fontana
- Succeeded by: Raffaele Fitto (2022)

Member of the Chamber of Deputies
- Incumbent
- Assumed office 13 October 2022
- Constituency: Basilicata
- In office 15 March 2013 – 22 March 2018
- Constituency: Campania

Personal details
- Born: 22 December 1973 (age 52) Naples, Italy
- Party: PCI (1989–1991); PDS (1991–1998); DS (1998–2007); PD (since 2007)

Vincenzo "Enzo" Amendola (born 22 December 1973) is an Italian politician of the Democratic Party (PD). On 5 September 2019, Amendola was appointed Minister for European Affairs in the Conte II Cabinet.

== Early life and career ==
Amendola was born in Naples in 1973. During the 1990s Amendola joined the Left Youth (SG), the youth wing of the Democrats of the Left (DS), the main social democratic party in Italy. In 1998, he was appointed SG's responsible for foreign affairs as well as vice president of the International Union of Socialist Youth (IUSY), of which he was elected secretary general in 2001.

== Political career ==
In 2006, Amendola was appointed in the national secretariat of the Democrats of the Left, and in November 2006, he was elected regional secretary of DS for Campania. Together with the majority of DS members, in 2007 Amendola joined the Democratic Party (PD), the new centre-left party, born from the union between DS and The Daisy. In October 2009 he won the primary election to become regional secretary of the PD for Campania, a position that he held until 2014.

In the 2013 general election Amendola was elected to the Chamber of Deputies for the Campania constituency. As a deputy, he was appointed in the Foreign Affairs Commission, where he was elected leader of the PD's group.

In June 2013, PD's acting secretary, Guglielmo Epifani, appointed Amendola in the national secretariat, as coordinator of regional secretaries. In December 2013, Matteo Renzi became the new party's leader and Amendola was not confirmed in the secretariat; however, after only few months, many members of Renzi's board was appointed ministers in his newly formed government, thus Amendola was re-appointed in the secretariat as responsible for Foreign and European Affairs in September 2014. He was also responsible for relations with the Party of European Socialists.

On 29 January 2016, Amendola was appointed undersecretary to the Ministry of Foreign Affairs in Renzi's cabinet, a position that he held until 1 June 2018, serving under the premiership of Paolo Gentiloni too. In both governments, he had been responsible for Italians abroad and for environmental and energy policies. During his term he often accompanied the President of the Republic, Sergio Mattarella, on international state visits.

The 2018 general election resulted in a historic defeat for the PD and Amendola, who ran for the Senate of the Republic, did not succeed in being elected.

On 15 June 2019, the new party's leader, Nicola Zingaretti, appointed Amendola party's responsible for Foreign Affairs.

=== Minister of European Affairs ===
In August 2019 tensions grew within the populist government, leading to the issuing of a motion of no-confidence on Prime Minister Giuseppe Conte by the League. After Conte's resignation, the national board of the PD officially opened to the possibility of forming a new cabinet in a coalition with the M5S, based on pro-Europeanism, green economy, sustainable development, fight against economic inequality and a new immigration policy. The party also accepted that Conte may continue at the head of a new government, and on 29 August President Sergio Mattarella formally invested Conte to do so. On 5 September, Amendola was appointed new Minister of European Affairs.

From 17 to 21 July 2020, Amendola took part, along with Prime Minister Conte, in one of the longest European Councils in history. After days of harsh confrontations, the European leaders agreed on a new proposal by the President of the Council, Charles Michel, which provided a budget of €750 billion for the so-called Recovery Fund, composed of €390 billion in grants and €360 billion in loans. Italy would benefit from nearly €82 billion in grants and €127 billion in loans.

== Other activities ==
- European Council on Foreign Relations (ECFR), Member of the Council
- Istituto Affari Internazionali (IAI), Member of the Board

== Personal life ==
On 24 June 2013, Amendola married Karima Moual, an Italian journalist with Moroccan ancestry, with whom he has two children.

== Electoral history ==
Election	House	Constituency	Party	Votes	Result
2013	Chamber of Deputies	Campania 2	PD	– (Note: Elected in a closed list proportional representation system.)	Elected
2018	Senate of the Republic	Campania	PD	–	Not elected
2022	Chamber of Deputies	Basilicata	PD	–	Elected
