= Carlo Romei (politician) =

Italian politician (1924–1986)

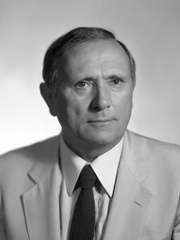
Carlo Romei

Carlo Romei (30 November 1924 – 16 October 1986) was an Italian politician.

Romei was born in Montevarchi on 30 November 1924. He was a representative and publicist for a trade union. Romei was first elected to the Senate in 1976 as a representative of Calabria affiliated with Christian Democracy. Romei was reelected twice thereafter, in 1979 and 1983. He died in the midst of his third term, on 16 October 1986, and was replaced by Ernesto Pucci. During his third senatorial term, Romei also served in the Craxi I Cabinet as undersecretary to the Ministry of Health from 9 August 1983 to 31 July 1986.
