= 2022 President of the Italian Chamber of Deputies election =

2022 Italian President of the Chamber of Deputies election
← 2018	13—14 October 2022

First ballot: 2/3 of the entire membership needed to win 400 members, 267 votes needed to win Final (fourth) ballot: a majority of members present needed to win 392 members present, 197 votes needed to win
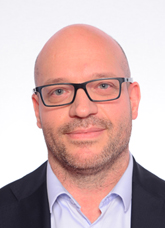

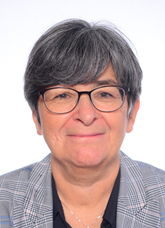

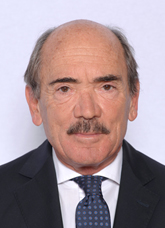

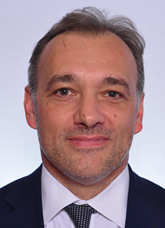
	Majority party	Minority party
Candidate	Lorenzo Fontana	Maria Cecilia Guerra
Party	Lega	Democratic Party
Seat	Verona (Note: Formally single-member electoral district no. 06 of Veneto 2 (Italian: collegio elettorale uninominale Veneto 2 - 06))	Turin (Note: Formally multi-member electoral district no. 01 of Piedmont 1 (Italian: collegio elettorale plurinominale Piemonte 1 - 06))
First ballot	0 (0.00%)	0 (0.00%)
Final ballot	222 (56.63%)	77 (19.64%)
	Third party	Fourth party
Candidate	Federico Cafiero De Raho	Matteo Richetti
Party	Five Star Movement	Action
Seat	Ravenna, Ferrara, Forlì-Cesena and Rimini (Note: Formally multi-member electoral district no. 03 of Emilia-Romagna (Italian: collegio elettorale plurinominale Emilia-Romagna - 03))	Parma and Modena (Note: Formally multi-member electoral district no. 01 of Emilia-Romagna (Italian: collegio elettorale plurinominale Emilia-Romagna - 01))
First ballot	0 (0.00%)	0 (0.00%)
Final ballot	52 (13.26%)	22 (5.61%)
President before election
Roberto Fico
Five Star Movement
Elected President
Lorenzo Fontana
Lega

The election of the President of the Italian Chamber of Deputies who would serve through the legislature XIX of Italy took place on 13 and 14 October 2022, almost four weeks after the 2022 Italian general election. Lorenzo Fontana, a member of the Lega was elected on the fourth ballot with 222 votes.

== Procedure ==
The election takes place by secret ballot. A two-thirds supermajority of the whole membership is needed to win on the first ballot. On the second and third ballots, a two-thirds supermajority of votes cast (including blank ballots among the totals) suffices. Starting from the fourth ballot, the threshold is further lowered to a simple majority of members present.

== History ==
As required by the assembly's standing orders, the election took place by secret ballot. Ettore Rosato, of Action – Italia Viva (A–IV) (being the most senior member to have served as Vice President of the Chamber of Deputies in the previous Parliament) served as acting presiding officer.

In early October the centre-right coalition, which held 237 seats (a majority of 36) designated Riccardo Molinari, a member of the League, as its official candidate for the Presidency of the Chamber. On the first three ballots, a two-thirds supermajority was required according to the standing orders; as no political coalition had enough seats to reach such a number, party leaders instructed MPs to cast blank ballots. Nonetheless, some members received a few votes on the first three ballots.

Following the election of Ignazio La Russa as President of the Senate and tensions within the centre-right, Lorenzo Fontana replaced Molinari as the official candidate of the conservative coalition shortly after the third ballot took place.

== Results ==
=== First ballot ===
Candidate	Party	Votes
Riccardo Molinari	Lega	4
Enrico Letta	Democratic Party	3
Others		6
Blank votes		368
Invalid votes		7
Did not vote (Note: Members in this category did not cast a ballot and weren't counted for the purpose of determining whether a quorum was present)		8
Needed to win		267 (Note: 2/3 of members)

=== Second ballot ===
Candidate	Party	Votes
Enrico Letta	Democratic Party	4
Riccardo Molinari	Lega	3
Nico Stumpo	Democratic Party	3
Others		7
Blank votes		368
Invalid votes		7
Did not vote		11
Needed to win		259 (Note: 2/3 of members present)

=== Third ballot ===
Candidate	Party	Votes
Andrea Casu	Democratic Party	3
Riccardo Molinari	Lega	3
Others		7
Blank votes		368
Invalid votes		7
Did not vote		22
Needed to win		252

=== Fourth ballot ===
Candidate	Party	Votes
Lorenzo Fontana	Lega	222
Maria Cecilia Guerra	Democratic Party	77
Federico Cafiero de Raho	Five Star Movement	52
Matteo Richetti	Action – Italia Viva	22
Others		2
Blank votes		6
Invalid votes		11
Did not vote		11
Needed to win		197 (Note: A majority of members present)

== See also ==
- 2022 President of the Italian Senate election
