= Gaetano Gorgoni =

Italian politician (1933–2020)

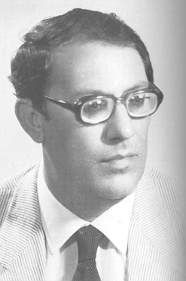
Gaetano Gorgoni

Gaetano Gorgoni (26 August 1933 – 13 May 2020) was an Italian politician who served as a Deputy.
