= Fabio Fabbri =

Italian Socialist Party politician (1933–2024)

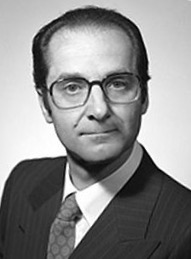

Minister of Defence
- In office 29 April 1993 – 11 May 1994
- Prime Minister: Carlo Azeglio Ciampi
- Preceded by: Salvo Andò
- Succeeded by: Cesare Previti

Secretary of the Council of Ministers
- In office 28 June 1992 – 29 April 1993
- Prime Minister: Giuliano Amato
- Preceded by: Nino Cristofori
- Succeeded by: Antonio Maccanico

Member of the Senate of the Republic
- In office 5 July 1976 – 14 April 1994
- Constituency: Emilia-Romagna

Personal details
- Born: 15 October 1933 Ciano d'Enza, Italy
- Died: 4 January 2024 (aged 90) Parma, Italy
- Party: Italian Socialist Party
- Education: University of Parma
- Occupation: Lawyer

Fabio Fabbri (15 October 1933 – 4 January 2024) was an Italian politician and lawyer.

== Biography ==
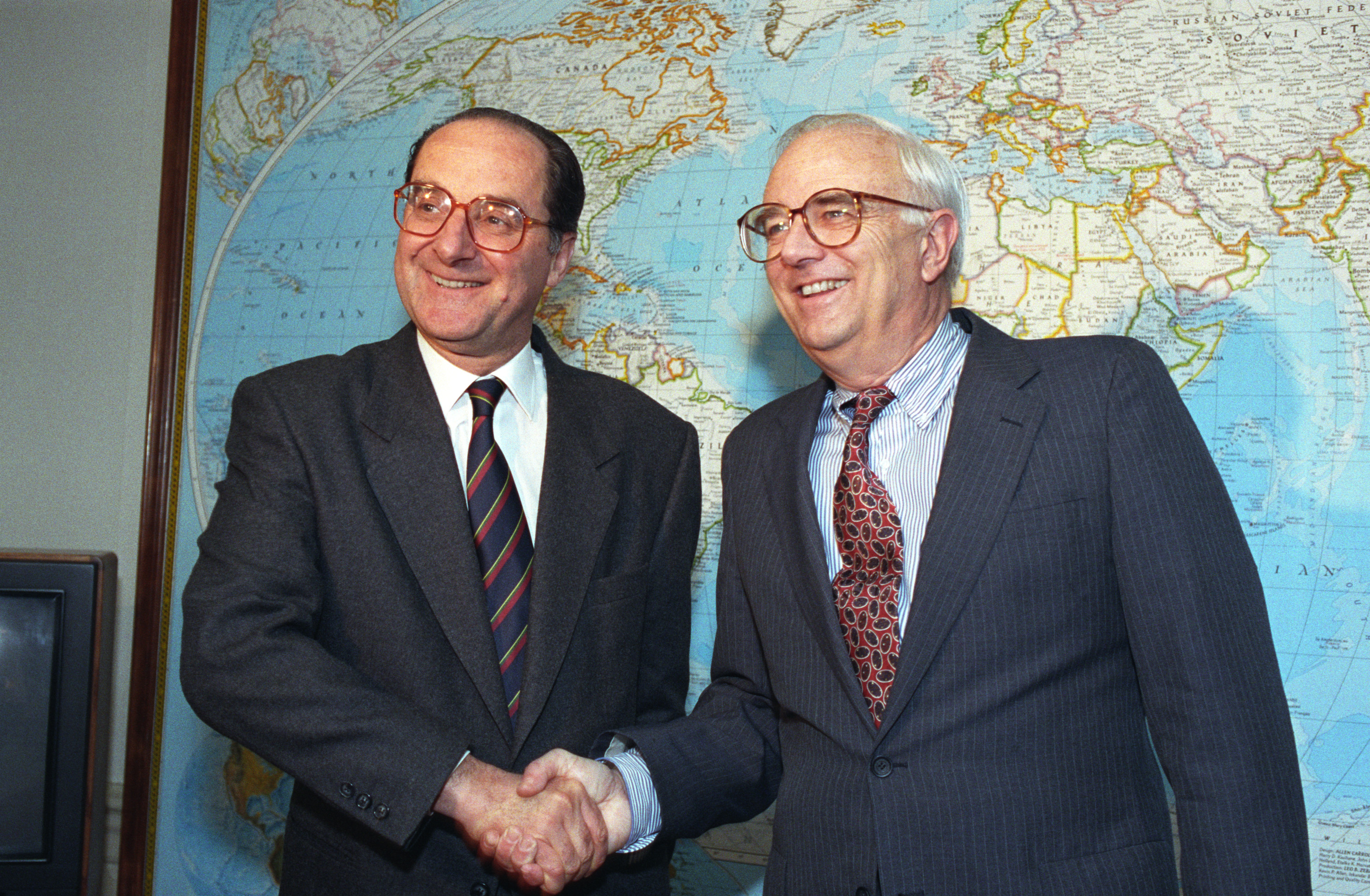
Fabbri with Les Aspin in 1993

Fabbri was born in Ciano d'Enza, Italy, on 15 October 1933. He graduated from the University of Parma with a law degree, and began a career as a lawyer.

Fabbri was a Senator from 1976 to 1994 for the Italian Socialist Party. He was an Undersecretary for Agriculture and Forestry in the 2nd Cossiga government, in the Forlani government and the two Spadolini governments, and the Secretary of the Council of Ministers in the first Amato government. He also served as minister for regional affairs in the fifth Fanfani government, as minister of community policies in the second Craxi government and as minister of defence in the Ciampi government.

After leaving office he worked on protecting the Apennine Mountains through an editorial initiative and the Man and the Biosphere Programme.

Fabio Fabbri died in Parma on 4 January 2024, at the age of 90.

== Honours and awards ==
- Italy: Chancellor and Treasurer of the Military Order of Italy (From 28 April 1993 to 10 May 1994)
- Italy: Knight of the Grand Cross of the Order of Merit of the Italian Republic (Rome, 11 May 1994)
