= Delio Meoli =

Italian politician (1928–2012)

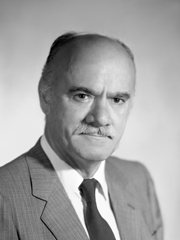

Member of the Senate of the Republic
- In office 19 July 1983 – 22 April 1992

Member of the Regional Council of Liguria
- In office 1970–1983

Regional assessor for Urban planning of Liguria
- In office 29 July 1975 – 20 November 1980
- President: Angelo Carossino; Armando Magliotto

President of the Province of Genoa
- In office 1971–1972
- Preceded by: Gabriele Di Pasqua
- Succeeded by: Rinaldo Magnani

Personal details
- Born: 3 February 1928 Montefoscoli, Palaia, Province of Pisa, Kingdom of Italy
- Died: 1 March 2012 (aged 84) Genoa, Italy
- Party: Italian Socialist Party
- Profession: Manager

Delio Meoli (3 February 1928 – 1 March 2012) was an Italian politician and manager. A member of the Italian Socialist Party, he served as president of the Province of Genoa from 1971 to 1972 and as a member of the Senate of the Republic from 1983 to 1992. He was also a regional councillor and assessor of Liguria.
