= Giuseppe Galasso =

Italian historian and politician

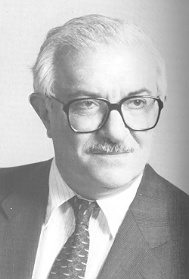

Member of the Chamber of Deputies
- In office 12 July 1983 – 14 April 1994
- Constituency: Naples

Personal details
- Born: 19 November 1929 Naples, Kingdom of Italy
- Died: 12 February 2018 (aged 88) Pozzuoli, Italy
- Party: Italian Republican Party
- Education: University of Naples Federico II
- Occupation: politician
- Profession: historian, lecteurer

Giuseppe Galasso (19 November 1929 – 12 February 2018) was an Italian historian and politician. He has been a member of the Chamber of Deputies from 1983 to 1994.

== Early life and career ==
He was born in Naples in 1929: the son of a glass craftsman, he had lost his mother in 1941 and had done a little bit of everything, even the kitchen boy and the porter, to help run the family. He first took the master's qualification, in 1946, at the Pasquale Villari school, then the year after his high school diploma at Umberto high school, as a private owner".

== Academic activity ==
Graduated in medieval history, and subsequently in literature at the Federico II University of Naples, in 1956 he won a scholarship, made available by the Italian Institute for Historical Studies, of which he would later become secretary.

In 1963 he obtained a free lecturer and taught at the universities of Salerno, Cagliari and Naples.

He has been Professor of Medieval and Modern History at the Frederick University since 1966. He was elected dean of the Faculty of Literature and Philosophy of the same university from 1972 to 1979. He was a professor of modern history at the Suor Orsola Benincasa University in Naples.

He has been president of the Neapolitan Society of Homeland History since 1980; member of the scientific council of the Higher School of Historical Studies of San Marino. He was president of the Venice Biennale from December 1978 to March 1983 and of the European Society of Culture from 1982 to 1988. From 1977 he was a member of the Accademia dei Lincei.

== Politics ==
Member of the Italian Republican Party, he was a municipal councilor in Naples from 1970 to 1993, of which he was also Assessor for Public Education from 1970 to 1973. In 1975 he was appointed mayor of the city, but he gave up his position because he was unable to set up a government.

He was a member of the Chamber of Deputies for the Republican Party in the IX, X and XI legislatures (from 1983 to 1994).

Between 1983 and 1987 he was undersecretary of the Ministry of Cultural and Environmental Heritage (first and second Craxi government). In this office he was the author of a series of ministerial decrees that imposed restrictions on various landscape assets (so-called "galassini"): he subsequently gave this administrative complex a more solid legislative foundation than that offered by the previous Bottai law of 1 June 1939, no. 1089, promoting the law 8 August 1985, n. 431 for the protection of the landscape (known as the "Galasso law"). From 1988 to 1991 (De Mita government / sixth Andreotti government) he served as undersecretary of the Ministry for extraordinary intervention in the South.

== Journalistic activity ==
Galasso also carried out an intense journalistic activity, as a columnist and protagonist of cultural debates: among many, that of April 2007 in the "Corriere della Sera" around the homologation of the Risorgimento - and then of the Rinascimento - as an ante -litteram, which he clearly rejected. He has collaborated with numerous national newspapers and periodicals: Il Mattino, Il Corriere della Sera, La Stampa, L'Espresso, among the main ones. He directed the magazine Comprendre, official organ of the Venetian Foundation "European Society of Culture".
