= Franca Falcucci =

Italian politician (1926–2014)

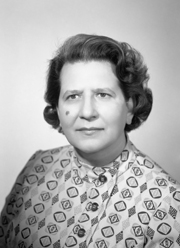

Minister of Public Education
- In office 1 December 1982 – 28 July 1987
- Prime Minister: Amintore Fanfani; Bettino Craxi
- Preceded by: Guido Bodrato
- Succeeded by: Giovanni Galloni

Member of the Senate of the Republic
- In office 5 June 1968 – 22 April 1992
- Constituency: Lazio (1968–1983); Campania (1983–1992)

Personal details
- Born: 22 March 1926 Rome, Italy
- Died: 4 September 2014 (aged 88) Rome, Italy
- Party: Christian Democracy
- Profession: Politician, teacher

Franca Falcucci (22 March 1926 – 4 September 2014) was an Italian politician, member of the Christian Democracy Party. She served at the Senate and was the first woman to become minister of public education.

== Biography ==
Born in Rome in 1926, Falcucci taught Latin and Greek in Roman lyceums before becoming a politician in 1968.

In 1974, the Minister of Education Franco Maria Malfatti asked Falcucci to chair a team in charge of researching the problems of disabled students. The "Falcucci Document", issued in 1975, was one of the most advanced studies of disability issues at both the European and international level, promoting a new way of thinking about the issue. The document stated that "... school brings educational action and potential of each student, and looks as the most appropriate structure to overcome the conditions of marginalization that would otherwise be condemned children with disabilities ..."

She died on 4 September 2014. Her niece Alessandra assisted her during the end of her life.

== Electoral history ==
Election	House	Constituency	Party	Votes	Result
1968	Senate of the Republic	Lazio – Rome VII	DC	37,274	Elected
1972	Senate of the Republic	Lazio – Rome VII	DC	66,699	Elected
1976	Senate of the Republic	Lazio – Rome VII	DC	78,275	Elected
1979	Senate of the Republic	Lazio – Rome VII	DC	77,479	Elected
1983	Senate of the Republic	Campania – Cerreto Sannita	DC	40,687	Elected
1987	Senate of the Republic	Campania – Cerreto Sannita	DC	35,889	Elected

== Notes ==
Political offices
Preceded by Guido Bodrato	Italian Minister of Education; 1982–1987	Succeeded by Giovanni Galloni
