= Francesco Forte (politician) =

Italian politician (1929–2022)

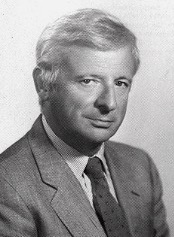
- Forte in the 1980s

Minister of Finance
- In office 1 December 1982 – 4 August 1983
- Prime Minister: Amintore Fanfani
- Preceded by: Rino Formica
- Succeeded by: Bruno Visentini

Minister for the Coordination of Community Policies
- In office 4 August 1983 – 9 May 1985
- Prime Minister: Bettino Craxi
- Preceded by: Alfredo Biondi
- Succeeded by: Loris Fortuna

Undersecretary of the Ministry of Foreign Affairs
- In office 9 May 1985 – 3 March 1987
- Prime Minister: Bettino Craxi
- Preceded by: Raffaele Costa; Roberto Palleschi
- Succeeded by: Francesco Cattanei; Giorgio Santuz

Personal details
- Born: 11 February 1929 Busto Arsizio, Italy
- Died: 1 January 2022 (aged 92) Turin, Italy
- Party: Italian Socialist Party

Francesco Forte (11 February 1929 – 1 January 2022) was an Italian politician, academic and economist. He was a member of the Italian Socialist Party (PSI).

== Political career ==
Forte was Minister of Finance between 1982 and 1983. He was a cabinet member during the Bettino Craxi and Amintore Fanfani governments.

Forte was a member of the Chamber of Deputies from 1979 until 1987. He was later a member of the Senate from 1987 until 1994. Forte served as Undersecretary of the Ministry of Foreign Affairs between 1983 until 1987. He was also Minister of European Affairs between 1983 until 1986.

Forte also was a university professor. In 1961, he began working at the University of Turin. He was an economic adviser for the PSI.

== Personal life and death ==
Forte was born in Busto Arsizio, Italy, on 11 February 1929. He died in Turin on 1 January 2022, at the age of 92.
