= Second Moro government =

20th government of the Italian Republic

Moro II Cabinet
- 20th Cabinet of Italy

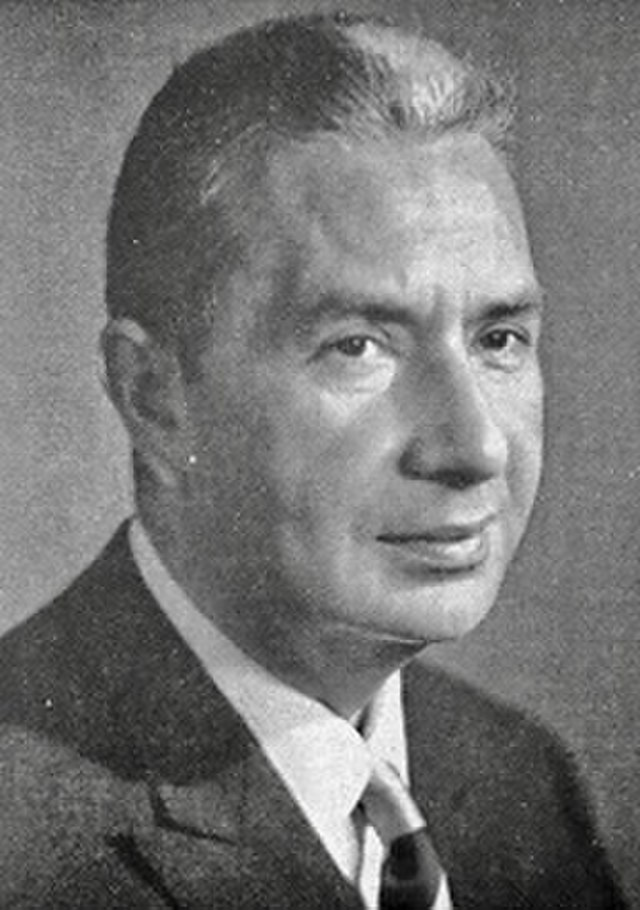
- Date formed: 22 July 1964
- Date dissolved: 23 February 1966

People and organisations
- Head of state: Antonio Segni; Giuseppe Saragat
- Head of government: Aldo Moro
- Total no. of members: 25
- Member parties: DC, PSI, PSDI, PRI
- Status in legislature: Coalition government Organic Centre-left
- Opposition parties: PCI, PLI, MSI, PDIUM, PSIUP

History
- Legislature term: Legislature IV (1963–1968)
- Predecessor: Moro I Cabinet
- Successor: Moro III Cabinet

The Moro II Cabinet was the 20th cabinet of the Italian Republic, headed by Prime Minister Aldo Moro, that held office from 22 July 1963 to 23 February 1964, for a total of 581 days, or 1 year, 7 months and 1 day. The cabinet was described as an organic centre-left government.

== Party breakdown ==
- Christian Democracy (DC): prime minister, 15 ministers, 25 undersecretaries
- Italian Socialist Party (PSI): deputy prime minister, 5 ministers, 10 undersecretaries
- Italian Democratic Socialist Party (PSDI): 3 ministers, 5 undersecretaries
- Italian Republican Party (PRI): 1 minister, 1 undersecretary

== Composition ==
Office	Name	Party	Term
Prime Minister	Aldo Moro	DC	22 July 1964 – 23 February 1966
Deputy Prime Minister	Pietro Nenni	PSI	22 July 1964 – 23 February 1966
Minister of Foreign Affairs	Giuseppe Saragat	PSDI	22 July 1964 – 28 December 1964
Minister of Foreign Affairs	Aldo Moro (ad interim)	DC	28 December 1964 – 5 March 1965
Minister of Foreign Affairs	Amintore Fanfani	DC	5 March 1965 – 30 December 1965
Minister of Foreign Affairs	Aldo Moro (ad interim)	DC	30 December 1965 – 23 February 1966
Minister of the Interior	Paolo Emilio Taviani	DC	22 July 1964 – 23 February 1966
Minister of Grace and Justice	Oronzo Reale	PRI	22 July 1964 – 23 February 1966
Minister of Budget	Giovanni Pieraccini	PSI	22 July 1964 – 23 February 1966
Minister of Finance	Roberto Tremelloni	PSDI	22 July 1964 – 23 February 1966
Minister of Treasury	Emilio Colombo	DC	22 July 1964 – 23 February 1966
Minister of Defence	Giulio Andreotti	DC	22 July 1964 – 23 February 1966
Minister of Public Education	Luigi Gui	DC	22 July 1964 – 23 February 1966
Minister of Public Works	Giacomo Mancini	PSI	22 July 1964 – 23 February 1966
Minister of Agriculture and Forests	Mario Ferrari Aggradi	DC	22 July 1964 – 23 February 1966
Minister of Transport and Civil Aviation	Angelo Raffaele Jervolino	DC	22 July 1964 – 23 February 1966
Minister of Post and Telecommunications	Carlo Russo	DC	22 July 1964 – 23 February 1966
Minister of Industry and Commerce	Giuseppe Medici	DC	22 July 1964 – 5 March 1965
Minister of Industry and Commerce	Edgardo Lami Starnuti	PSDI	5 March 1965 – 23 February 1966
Minister of Health	Luigi Mariotti	PSI	22 July 1964 – 23 February 1966
Minister of Foreign Trade	Bernardo Mattarella	DC	22 July 1964 – 23 February 1966
Minister of Merchant Navy	Giovanni Spagnolli	DC	22 July 1964 – 23 February 1966
Minister of State Holdings	Giorgio Bo	DC	22 July 1964 – 23 February 1966
Minister of Labour and Social Security	Umberto Delle Fave	DC	22 July 1964 – 23 February 1966
Minister of Tourism and Entertainment	Achille Corona	PSI	22 July 1964 – 23 February 1966
Minister for Particular Political Tasks (without portfolio)	Attilio Piccioni	DC	22 July 1964 – 23 February 1966
Minister for Extraordinary Interventions in the South (without portfolio)	Giulio Pastore	DC	22 July 1964 – 23 February 1966
Minister for Parliamentary Relations (without portfolio)	Giovanni Battista Scaglia	DC	22 July 1964 – 23 February 1966
Minister for Scientific Research (without portfolio)	Carlo Arnaudi	PSI	22 July 1964 – 23 February 1966
Minister for Public Administration Reform (without portfolio)	Luigi Preti	PSDI	22 July 1964 – 23 February 1966
Secretary of the Council of Ministers	Angelo Salizzoni	DC	22 July 1964 – 23 February 1966
