= First Moro government =

19th government of the Italian Republic

Moro I Cabinet
- 19th Cabinet of Italy

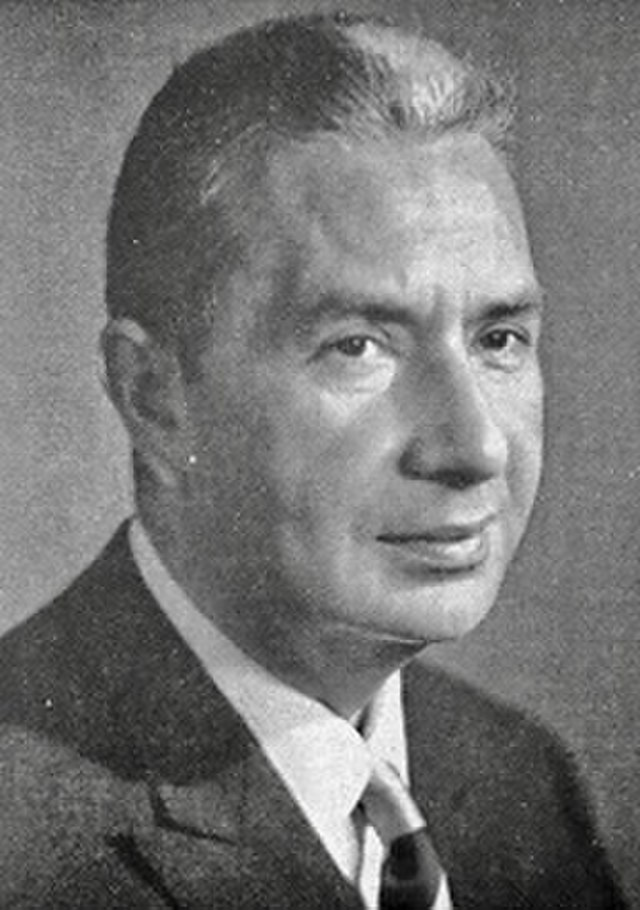
- Date formed: 5 December 1963
- Date dissolved: 23 July 1964

People and organisations
- Head of state: Antonio Segni
- Head of government: Aldo Moro
- Total no. of members: 25
- Member parties: DC, PSI, PSDI, PRI
- Status in legislature: Coalition government Organic Centre-left
- Opposition parties: PCI, PLI, MSI, PDIUM, PSIUP

History
- Predecessor: Leone I Cabinet
- Successor: Moro II Cabinet

The Moro I Cabinet was the 19th cabinet of the Italian Republic, headed by Prime Minister Aldo Moro, that held office from 4 December 1963 to 22 July 1964, for a total of 231 days, or 7 months and 18 days. The cabinet is described as an organic centre-left government.

== Government parties ==
The government was composed by the following parties:

Party	Ideology	Leader
Christian Democracy (DC)	Christian democracy	Aldo Moro
Italian Socialist Party (PSI)	Democratic socialism	Pietro Nenni
Italian Democratic Socialist Party (PSDI)	Social democracy	Giuseppe Saragat
Italian Republican Party (PRI)	Social liberalism	Oronzo Reale

== Party breakdown ==
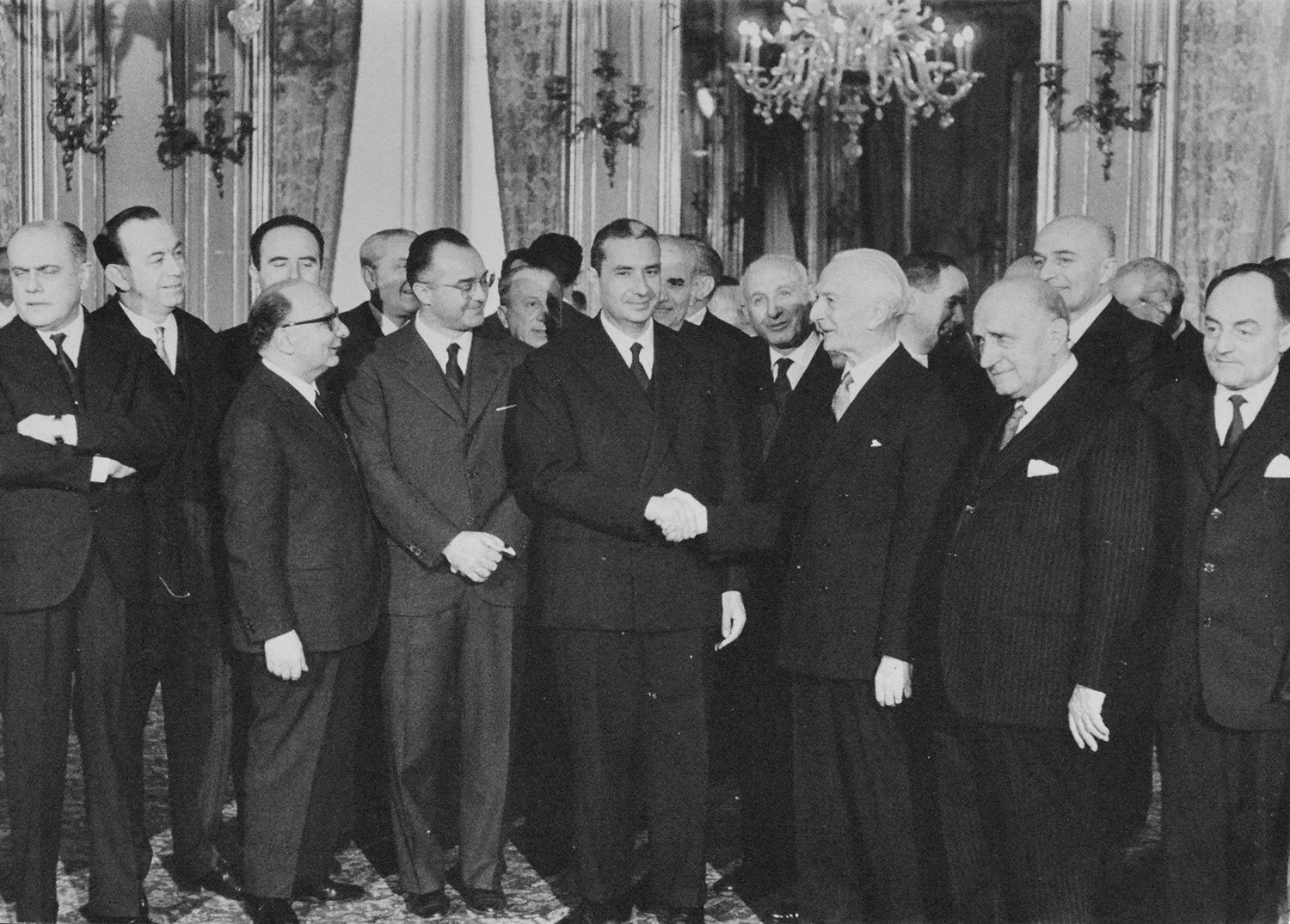
Official photo of the Moro's government after the oath at the Quirinal Palace

- Christian Democracy (DC): prime minister, 15 ministers, 26 undersecretaries
- Italian Socialist Party (PSI): deputy prime minister, 5 ministers, 10 undersecretaries
- Italian Democratic Socialist Party (PSDI): 3 ministers, 5 undersecretaries
- Italian Republican Party (PRI): 1 minister, 1 undersecretary

== Composition ==
Office	Name	Party	Term
Prime Minister	Aldo Moro	DC	5 December 1963 – 23 July 1964
Deputy Prime Minister	Pietro Nenni	PSI	5 December 1963 – 23 July 1964
Minister of Foreign Affairs	Giuseppe Saragat	PSDI	5 December 1963 – 23 July 1964
Minister of the Interior	Paolo Emilio Taviani	DC	5 December 1963 – 23 July 1964
Minister of Grace and Justice	Oronzo Reale	PRI	5 December 1963 – 23 July 1964
Minister of Budget	Antonio Giolitti	PSI	5 December 1963 – 23 July 1964
Minister of Finance	Roberto Tremelloni	PSDI	5 December 1963 – 23 July 1964
Minister of Treasury	Emilio Colombo	DC	5 December 1963 – 23 July 1964
Minister of Defence	Giulio Andreotti	DC	5 December 1963 – 23 July 1964
Minister of Public Education	Luigi Gui	DC	5 December 1963 – 23 July 1964
Minister of Public Works	Giovanni Pieraccini	PSI	5 December 1963 – 23 July 1964
Minister of Agriculture and Forests	Mario Ferrari Aggradi	DC	5 December 1963 – 23 July 1964
Minister of Transport and Civil Aviation	Angelo Raffaele Jervolino	DC	5 December 1963 – 23 July 1964
Minister of Post and Telecommunications	Carlo Russo	DC	5 December 1963 – 23 July 1964
Minister of Industry and Commerce	Giuseppe Medici	DC	5 December 1963 – 23 July 1964
Minister of Health	Giacomo Mancini	PSI	5 December 1963 – 23 July 1964
Minister of Foreign Trade	Bernardo Mattarella	DC	5 December 1963 – 23 July 1964
Minister of Merchant Navy	Giovanni Spagnolli	DC	5 December 1963 – 23 July 1964
Minister of State Holdings	Giorgio Bo	DC	5 December 1963 – 23 July 1964
Minister of Labour and Social Security	Giacinto Bosco	DC	5 December 1963 – 23 July 1964
Minister of Tourism and Entertainment	Achille Corona	PSI	5 December 1963 – 23 July 1964
Minister for Special Political Tasks (without portfolio)	Attilio Piccioni	DC	5 December 1963 – 23 July 1964
Minister for the South and the Depressed Areas (without portfolio)	Giulio Pastore	DC	5 December 1963 – 23 July 1964
Minister for Parliamentary Relations (without portfolio)	Umberto Delle Fave	DC	5 December 1963 – 23 July 1964
Minister for Scientific Research (without portfolio)	Carlo Arnaudi	PSI	5 December 1963 – 23 July 1964
Minister for Public Administration Reform (without portfolio)	Luigi Preti	PSDI	5 December 1963 – 23 July 1964
Secretary of the Council of Ministers	Angelo Salizzoni	DC	5 December 1963 – 23 July 1964
