= Minister of University and Research =

Ministry in the Cabinet of Italy

- Ministro dell'Università e della Ricerca

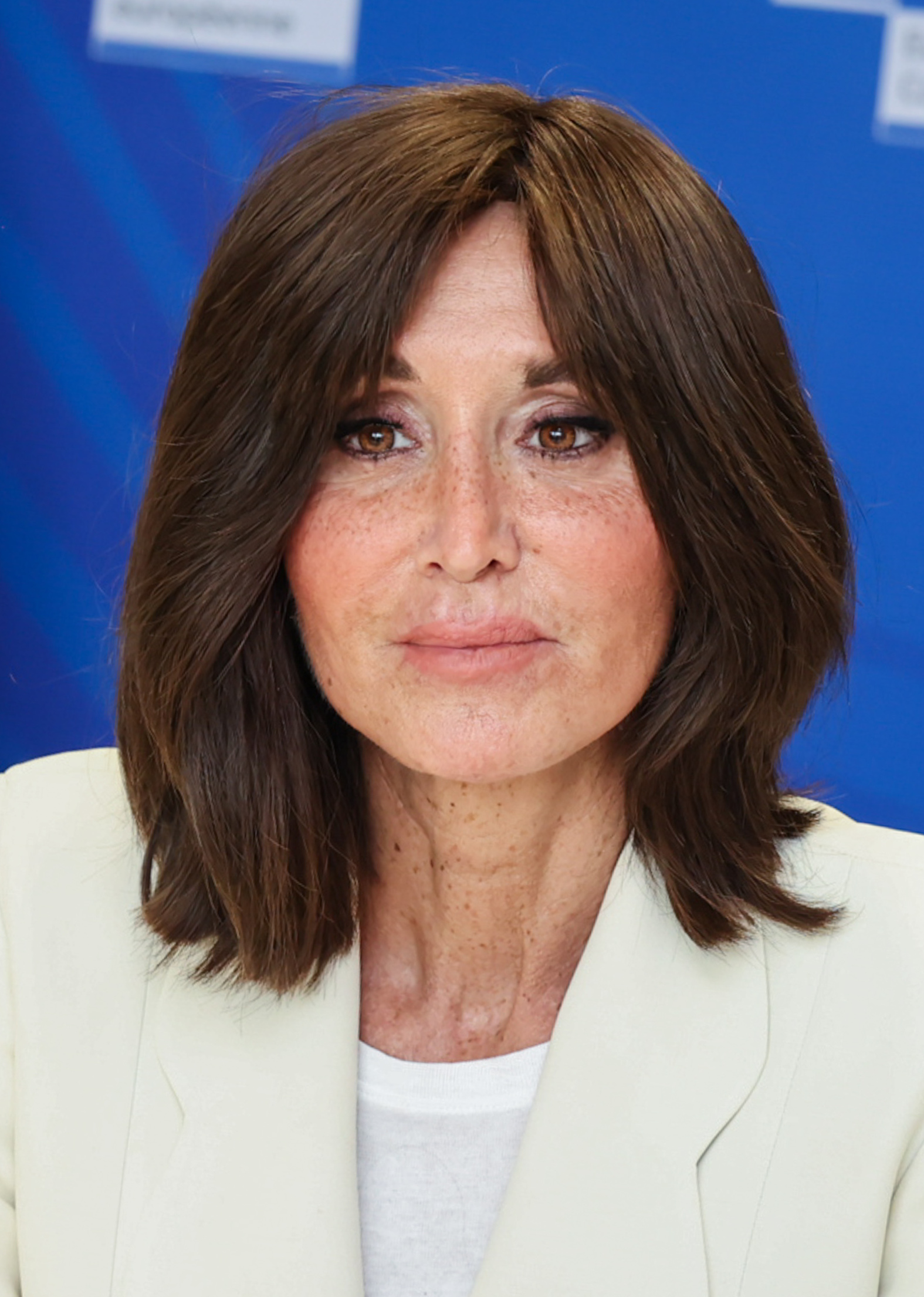
- Incumbent; Anna Maria Bernini since October 22, 2022
- Ministry of University and Research
- Member of: Council of Ministers
- Seat: Rome
- Appointer: The president of Italy
- Term length: No fixed term
- Formation: November 30, 1962; 63 years ago
- First holder: Guido Corbellini
- Website: www.miur.gov.it

This is a list of Italian ministers of university and research since 1962. From 2001 to 2006 and from 2008 to 2019 the office had been incorporated with the office of Minister of Public Education into the office of Minister of Education, Universities and Research.

The current office holder is Anna Maria Bernini, a member of Forza Italia who has been serving in the cabinet of Giorgia Meloni since October 2022.

== List of education ministers ==
Parties

- 1946–1994:
  - Christian Democracy
  - Italian Socialist Party
  - Italian Democratic Socialist Party
  - Italian Republican Party
- 1994–present:
  - Democratic Party of the Left / Democrats of the Left
  - Forza Italia / The People of Freedom
  - Italian People's Party
  - Democratic Party
  - Five Star Movement
  - Independent

Coalitions

- 1946–1994:
  - Centrist coalition
  - Organic centre-left
  - Pentapartito / Quadripartito
  - Mixed coalition
- 1994–present:
  - Centre-right coalition
  - Centre-left coalition
  - Mixed coalition

Portrait	Name (Born–Died)	Term of office			Party	Government	Ref.
Portrait	Name (Born–Died)	Took office	Left office	Time in office	Party	Government	Ref.
Minister of University and Research
	Guido Corbellini (1890–1976)	30 November 1962	21 June 1963	203 days	Christian Democracy	Fanfani IV	
Office not in use		1963–1963				Leone I	
	Carlo Arnaudi (1899–1970)	4 December 1963	23 February 1966	2 years, 81 days	Italian Socialist Party	Moro I·II	
	Leopoldo Rubinacci (1903–1969)	23 February 1966	24 June 1968	2 years, 122 days	Christian Democracy	Moro III	
Office not in use		1968–1968				Leone II	
	Salvatore Lauricella (1922–1996)	12 December 1968	5 August 1969	236 days	Italian Socialist Party	Rumor I	
	Arnaldo Forlani (1925–2023)	5 August 1969	11 November 1969	98 days	Christian Democracy	Rumor II	
	Giorgio Bo (1905–1980)	11 November 1969	27 March 1970	136 days	Christian Democracy	Rumor II	
	Camillo Ripamonti (1919–1997)	27 March 1970	17 February 1972	1 year, 327 days	Christian Democracy	Rumor III; Colombo	
	Fiorentino Sullo (1921–2000)	17 February 1972	26 June 1972	130 days	Christian Democracy	Andreotti I	
	Pier Luigi Romita (1924–2003)	26 June 1972	7 July 1973	1 year, 11 days	Italian Democratic Socialist Party	Andreotti II	
	Pietro Bucalossi (1905–1992)	7 July 1973	14 March 1974	250 days	Italian Republican Party	Rumor IV	
	Giovanni Pieraccini (1918–2017)	14 March 1974	23 November 1974	254 days	Italian Socialist Party	Rumor V	
	Mario Pedini (1918–2003)	23 November 1974	12 February 1976	1 year, 81 days	Christian Democracy	Moro IV	
Office not in use		1976–1979				Moro V Andreotti III·IV·V	
	Vito Scalia (1925–2009)	4 August 1979	4 April 1980	244 days	Christian Democracy	Cossiga I	
	Vincenzo Balzamo (1929–1992)	4 April 1980	18 October 1980	197 days	Italian Socialist Party	Cossiga II	
	Pier Luigi Romita (1924–2003)	18 October 1980	28 June 1981	253 days	Italian Democratic Socialist Party	Forlani	
	Giancarlo Tesini (1929–2023)	28 June 1981	1 December 1982	1 year, 156 days	Christian Democracy	Spadolini I·II	
	Pier Luigi Romita (1924–2003)	1 December 1982	4 August 1983	246 days	Italian Democratic Socialist Party	Fanfani V	
	Luigi Granelli (1929–1999)	4 August 1983	29 July 1987	3 years, 359 days	Christian Democracy	Craxi I·II	
	Luigi Granelli (1929–1999)	4 August 1983	29 July 1987	3 years, 359 days	Christian Democracy	Fanfani VI	
	Antonio Ruberti (1927–2000)	29 July 1987	28 June 1992	4 years, 335 days	Italian Socialist Party	Goria; De Mita; Andreotti VI·VII	
	Alessandro Fontana (1936–2013)	28 June 1992	28 April 1993	304 days	Christian Democracy	Amato I	
	Luigi Berlinguer (1932–2023)	28 April 1993	4 May 1993	6 days	Democratic Party of the Left	Ciampi	
	Umberto Colombo (1927–2006)	4 May 1993	10 May 1994	1 year, 6 days	Independent	Ciampi	
	Stefano Podestà (1939–)	10 May 1994	17 January 1995	252 days	Forza Italia	Berlusconi I	
	Giorgio Salvini (1920–2015)	17 January 1995	17 May 1996	1 year, 121 days	Independent	Dini	
Minister of Education, University and Research
	Luigi Berlinguer (1932–2023)	17 May 1996	21 October 1998	2 years, 157 days	Democratic Party of the Left	Prodi I	
Minister of University and Research
	Ortensio Zecchino (1943–)	21 October 1998	2 February 2001	2 years, 104 days	Italian People's Party	D'Alema I·II; Amato II	
	Giuliano Amato (1938– ) Acting	2 February 2001	11 June 2001	129 days	Independent	Amato II	
Minister of Education, University and Research
	Letizia Moratti (1949–)	11 June 2001	17 May 2006	4 years, 340 days	Forza Italia	Berlusconi II·III	
Minister of University and Research
	Fabio Mussi (1948–2026)	17 May 2006	8 May 2008	1 year, 357 days	Democrats of the Left / Democratic Left	Prodi II	
Minister of Education, University and Research
	Mariastella Gelmini (1973–)	8 May 2008	16 November 2011	3 years, 192 days	The People of Freedom	Berlusconi IV	
	Francesco Profumo (1953– )	16 November 2011	28 April 2013	1 year, 163 days	Independent	Monti	
	Maria Chiara Carrozza (1965–)	28 April 2013	22 February 2014	300 days	Democratic Party	Letta	
	Stefania Giannini (1960–)	22 February 2014	12 December 2016	2 years, 294 days	Civic Choice / Democratic Party	Renzi	
	Valeria Fedeli (1949–2026)	12 December 2016	1 June 2018	1 year, 171 days	Democratic Party	Gentiloni	
	Marco Bussetti (1962– )	1 June 2018	5 September 2019	1 year, 96 days	Independent	Conte I	
	Lorenzo Fioramonti (1977– )	5 September 2019	25 December 2019	111 days	Five Star Movement	Conte II	
	Giuseppe Conte (1964– ) As Prime Minister	25 December 2019	10 January 2020	16 days	Independent	Conte II	
Minister of University and Research
	Gaetano Manfredi (1964– )	10 January 2020	13 February 2021	1 year, 34 days	Independent	Conte II	
	Maria Cristina Messa (1961– )	13 February 2021	22 October 2022	1 year, 251 days	Independent	Draghi	
	Anna Maria Bernini (1965– )	22 October 2022	Incumbent	3 years, 321 days	Forza Italia	Meloni	
