= Third Moro government =

21st government of the Italian Republic

Moro III Cabinet
- 21st Cabinet of Italy

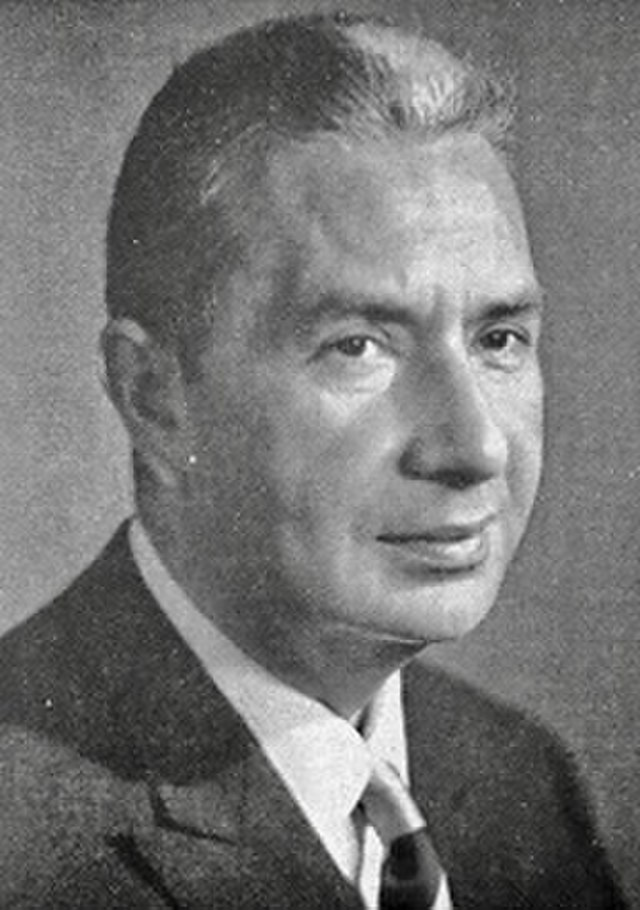
- Date formed: 23 February 1966
- Date dissolved: 24 June 1968

People and organisations
- Head of state: Giuseppe Saragat
- Head of government: Aldo Moro
- Total no. of members: 25
- Member parties: DC, PSI, PSDI, PRI
- Status in legislature: Coalition government Organic Centre-left
- Opposition parties: PCI, PLI, MSI, PDIUM, PSIUP

History
- Outgoing election: 1968 election
- Legislature term: Legislature IV (1963–1968)
- Predecessor: Moro II Cabinet
- Successor: Leone II Cabinet

The Moro III Cabinet was the 21st cabinet of the Italian Republic, that held office from 23 February, 1966 to 24 June, 1968, a total of 852 days. The cabinet is described as an organic centre-left government.

== Party breakdown ==
- Christian Democracy (DC): prime minister, 14 ministers, 27 undersecretaries
- Italian Socialist Party (PSI): deputy prime minister, 5 ministers, 13 undersecretaries
- Italian Democratic Socialist Party (PSDI): 2 ministers, 5 undersecretaries
- Italian Republican Party (PRI): 1 minister, 1 undersecretary

== Composition ==
Office	Name	Party	Term
Prime Minister	Aldo Moro	DC	23 February 1966 – 24 June 1968
Deputy Prime Minister	Pietro Nenni	PSI	23 February 1966 – 24 June 1968
Minister of Foreign Affairs	Amintore Fanfani	DC	23 February 1966 – 24 June 1968
Minister of the Interior	Paolo Emilio Taviani	DC	23 February 1966 – 24 June 1968
Minister of Grace and Justice	Oronzo Reale	PRI	23 February 1966 – 24 June 1968
Minister of Budget	Giovanni Pieraccini	PSI	23 February 1966 – 24 June 1968
Minister of Finance	Luigi Preti	PSDI	23 February 1966 – 24 June 1968
Minister of Treasury	Emilio Colombo	DC	23 February 1966 – 24 June 1968
Minister of Defence	Roberto Tremelloni	PSDI	23 February 1966 – 24 June 1968
Minister of Public Education	Luigi Gui	DC	23 February 1966 – 24 June 1968
Minister of Public Works	Giacomo Mancini	PSI	23 February 1966 – 24 June 1968
Minister of Agriculture and Forests	Franco Restivo	DC	23 February 1966 – 24 June 1968
Minister of Transport and Civil Aviation	Oscar Luigi Scalfaro	DC	23 February 1966 – 24 June 1968
Minister of Post and Telecommunications	Giovanni Spagnolli	DC	23 February 1966 – 24 June 1968
Minister of Industry, Commerce and Craftsmanship (Note: Until 26 September 1966: Minister of Industry and Commerce)	Giulio Andreotti	DC	23 February 1966 – 24 June 1968
Minister of Health	Luigi Mariotti	PSI	23 February 1966 – 24 June 1968
Minister of Foreign Trade	Giusto Tolloy	PSI	23 February 1966 – 24 June 1968
Minister of Merchant Navy	Lorenzo Natali	DC	23 February 1966 – 24 June 1968
Minister of State Holdings	Giorgio Bo	DC	23 February 1966 – 24 June 1968
Minister of Labour and Social Security	Giacinto Bosco	DC	23 February 1966 – 24 June 1968
Minister of Tourism and Entertainment	Achille Corona	PSI	23 February 1966 – 24 June 1968
Minister for Particular Political Tasks (without portfolio)	Attilio Piccioni	DC	23 February 1966 – 24 June 1968
Minister for Extraordinary Interventions in the South (without portfolio)	Giulio Pastore	DC	23 February 1966 – 24 June 1968
Minister for Parliamentary Relations (without portfolio)	Giovanni Battista Scaglia	DC	23 February 1966 – 24 June 1968
Minister for Scientific Research (without portfolio)	Leopoldo Rubinacci	DC	23 February 1966 – 24 June 1968
Secretary of the Council of Ministers	Angelo Salizzoni	DC	23 February 1966 – 24 June 1968
