= First Leone government =

18th government of the Italian Republic

Leone I Cabinet
- 18th Cabinet of Italy

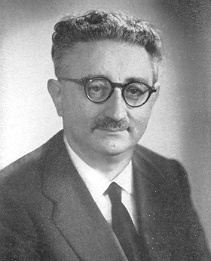
- Date formed: 22 June 1963
- Date dissolved: 5 December 1963

People and organisations
- Head of state: Antonio Segni
- Head of government: Giovanni Leone
- Total no. of members: 22
- Member party: DC
- Status in legislature: One-party government

History
- Election: 1963 election
- Legislature term: Legislature IV (1963–1968)
- Predecessor: Fanfani IV Cabinet
- Successor: Moro I Cabinet

The Leone I Cabinet was the 18th cabinet of the Italian Republic, which held office from 22 June 1963 to 5 December 1963, for a total of 166 days, or 5 months and 13 days.

It was also knowns as Bridge government (Governo ponte), as a transitional government awaiting the recomposition of the internal currents of the PSI (led respectively by Riccardo Lombardi and Pietro Nenni) and its entry into the cabinet.

== Composition ==
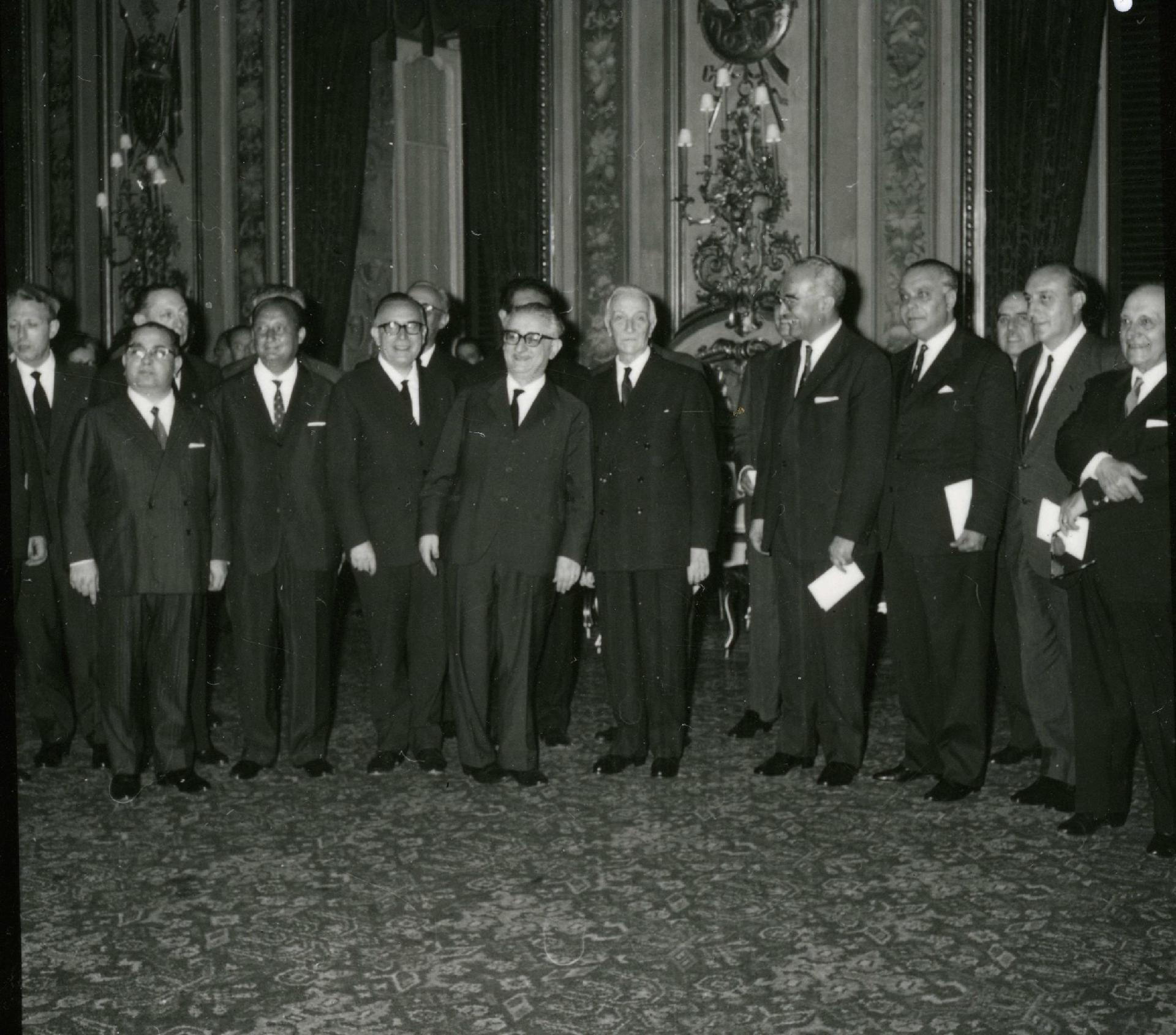
Official photo of the Leone's government after the oath at the Quirinal Palace

Office	Name	Party	Term
Prime Minister	Giovanni Leone	DC	22 June 1963 – 5 December 1963
Deputy Prime Minister	Attilio Piccioni	DC	22 June 1963 – 5 December 1963
Minister of Foreign Affairs	Attilio Piccioni	DC	22 June 1963 – 5 December 1963
Minister of the Interior	Mariano Rumor	DC	22 June 1963 – 5 December 1963
Minister of Grace and Justice	Giacinto Bosco	DC	22 June 1963 – 5 December 1963
Minister of Budget	Giuseppe Medici	DC	22 June 1963 – 5 December 1963
Minister of Finance	Mario Martinelli	DC	22 June 1963 – 5 December 1963
Minister of Treasury	Emilio Colombo	DC	22 June 1963 – 5 December 1963
Minister of Defence	Giulio Andreotti	DC	22 June 1963 – 5 December 1963
Minister of Public Education	Luigi Gui	DC	22 June 1963 – 5 December 1963
Minister of Public Works	Fiorentino Sullo	DC	22 June 1963 – 5 December 1963
Minister of Agriculture and Forests	Bernardo Mattarella	DC	22 June 1963 – 5 December 1963
Minister of Transport and Civil Aviation	Guido Corbellini	DC	22 June 1963 – 5 December 1963
Minister of Post and Telecommunications	Carlo Russo	DC	22 June 1963 – 5 December 1963
Minister of Industry and Commerce	Giuseppe Togni	DC	22 June 1963 – 5 December 1963
Minister of Health	Angelo Raffaele Jervolino	DC	22 June 1963 – 5 December 1963
Minister of Foreign Trade	Giuseppe Trabucchi	DC	22 June 1963 – 5 December 1963
Minister of Merchant Navy	Francesco Maria Dominedò	DC	22 June 1963 – 5 December 1963
Minister of State Holdings	Giorgio Bo	DC	22 June 1963 – 5 December 1963
Minister of Labour and Social Security	Umberto Delle Fave	DC	22 June 1963 – 5 December 1963
Minister of Tourism and Entertainment	Alberto Folchi	DC	22 June 1963 – 5 December 1963
Minister for the South and the Depressed Areas (without portfolio)	Giulio Pastore	DC	22 June 1963 – 5 December 1963
Minister for Parliamentary Relations (without portfolio)	Giuseppe Codacci Pisanelli	DC	22 June 1963 – 5 December 1963
Minister of Public Administration Reform (without portfolio)	Roberto Lucifredi	DC	22 June 1963 – 5 December 1963
Secretary of the Council of Ministers	Crescenzo Mazza	DC	22 June 1963 – 5 December 1963
