= Fifth De Gasperi government =

4th government of the Italian Republic

De Gasperi V Cabinet
- 4th Cabinet of Italy

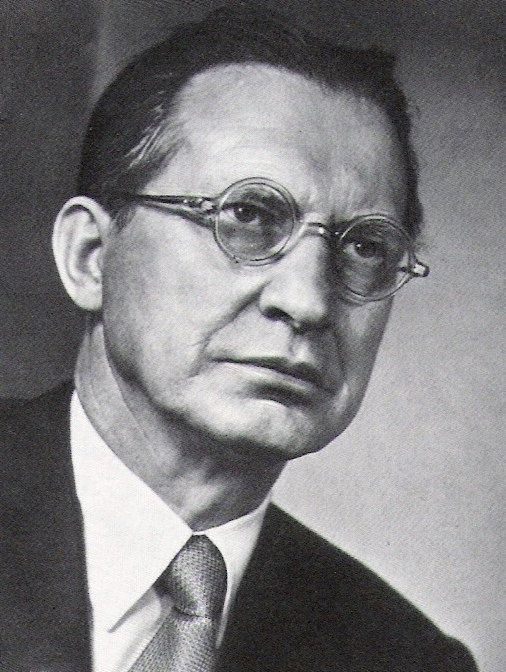
- Date formed: 24 May 1948
- Date dissolved: 27 January 1950

People and organisations
- Head of state: Luigi Einaudi
- Head of government: Alcide De Gasperi
- Member parties: DC, PSLI, PLI, PRI
- Status in legislature: Coalition government
- Opposition parties: FDP, PNM, MSI

History
- Election: 1948 election
- Legislature term: Legislature I (1948–1953)
- Predecessor: De Gasperi IV Cabinet
- Successor: De Gasperi VI Cabinet

The fifth De Gasperi government held office in the Italian Republic from 23 May 1948 until 27 January 1950, a total of 614 days, or 1 year, 8 months and 5 days.

== Party breakdown ==
=== Beginning of term ===
- Christian Democracy (DC): Prime minister, 1 deputy prime minister, 9 ministers, 16 undersecretaries
- Socialist Party of Italian Workers (PSLI): 3 ministers (inc. 1 deputy prime minister), 3 undersecretaries
- Italian Liberal Party (PLI): 1 deputy prime minister, 2 ministers, 3 undersecretaries
- Italian Republican Party (PRI): 1 minister, 2 undersecretaries
- Independents: 2 ministers

=== End of term ===
- Christian Democracy (DC): Prime minister, 1 deputy prime minister, 10 ministers, 16 undersecretaries
- Italian Liberal Party (PLI): 1 deputy prime minister, 2 ministers, 3 undersecretaries
- Italian Republican Party (PRI): 1 minister, 2 undersecretaries
- Independents: 1 minister

== Composition ==
Office	Name	Party	Term
Prime Minister	Alcide De Gasperi	DC	24 May 1948–27 January 1950
Deputy Prime Minister	Attilio Piccioni	DC	24 May 1948–27 January 1950
Deputy Prime Minister	Giovanni Porzio	PLI	24 May 1948–27 January 1950
Deputy Prime Minister	Giuseppe Saragat	PSLI	24 May 1948–27 January 1950
Minister of Foreign Affairs	Carlo Sforza	Independent	24 May 1948–27 January 1950
Minister of the Interior	Mario Scelba	DC	24 May 1948–27 January 1950
Minister of Italian Africa	Alcide De Gasperi (ad interim)	DC	24 May 1948–27 January 1950
Minister of Grace and Justice	Giuseppe Grassi	PLI	24 May 1948–27 January 1950
Minister of Budget	Giuseppe Pella (ad interim)	DC	24 May 1948–27 January 1950
Minister of Finance	Ezio Vanoni	DC	24 May 1948–27 January 1950
Minister of Treasury	Giuseppe Pella	DC	24 May 1948–27 January 1950
Minister of Defence	Randolfo Pacciardi	PRI	24 May 1948–27 January 1950
Minister of Public Education	Guido Gonella	DC	24 May 1948–27 January 1950
Minister of Public Works	Umberto Tupini	DC	24 May 1948–27 January 1950
Minister of Agriculture and Forests	Antonio Segni	DC	24 May 1948–27 January 1950
Minister of Transport	Guido Corbellini	DC	24 May 1948–27 January 1950
Minister of Post and Telecommunications	Angelo Raffaele Jervolino	DC	24 May 1948–27 January 1950
Minister of Industry and Commerce	Ivan Matteo Lombardo	PSLI	24 May 1948–7 November 1949
Minister of Industry and Commerce	Giovanni Battista Bertone (ad interim)	DC	7 November 1949–27 January 1950
Minister of Foreign Trade	Cesare Merzagora	Independent	24 May 1948–1 April 1949
Minister of Foreign Trade	Giovanni Battista Bertone	DC	1 April 1949–27 January 1950
Minister of Merchant Navy	Giuseppe Saragat	PSLI	24 May 1948–7 November 1949
Minister of Merchant Navy	Guido Corbellini (ad interim)	DC	7 November 1949–27 January 1950
Minister of Labour and Social Security	Amintore Fanfani	DC	24 May 1948–27 January 1950
Minister without portfolio	Roberto Tremelloni	PSLI	24 May 1948–7 November 1949
Minister without portfolio	Alberto Giovannini	PLI	24 May 1948–27 January 1950
Secretary of the Council of Ministers	Giulio Andreotti	DC	24 May 1948–27 January 1950
