= Secretary of the Council of Ministers (Italy) =

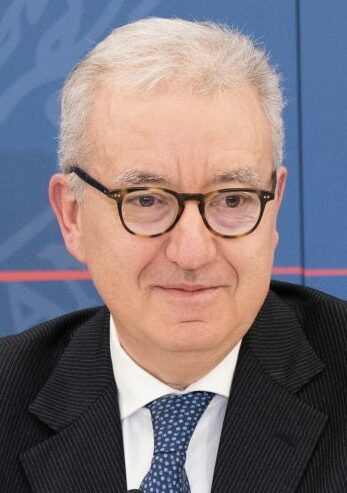
- Incumbent; Alfredo Mantovano since October 22, 2022
- Council of Ministers
- Seat: Rome
- Appointer: President of Italy
- Term length: No fixed term
- Inaugural holder: Paolo Cappa
- Formation: July 13, 1946; 80 years ago
- Website: www.governo.it

The secretary of the Council of Ministers (Italian: Segretario del Consiglio dei Ministri) is a senior member of the Italian Cabinet. The secretary is one of the undersecretaries of state to the Presidency of the Council of Ministers but, unlike them, he sits in the Cabinet and helps the prime minister in coordinating the government and its meetings. Thus, the secretary is usually a person very close to the prime minister. The secretary of the Council of Ministers, which may not be confused with the largely ceremonial office of Deputy Prime Minister (not all Italian Cabinets include one), resembles that of the White House chief of staff.

The current secretary of the Council of Ministers is Alfredo Mantovano, appointed on 22 October 2022 in the government led by Prime Minister Giorgia Meloni.

== List ==
Parties:

- 1946–1994:
  - Christian Democracy
  - Italian Republican Party
  - Italian Socialist Party
  - Independent
- 1994–present:
  - Forza Italia / The People of Freedom
  - Italian People's Party
  - Democrats of the Left
  - Democratic Party
  - League
  - Five Star Movement

Coalitions:

- 1946–1994:
  - National Liberation Committee
  - Centrist coalition
  - Organic centre-left
  - Pentapartito/Quadripartito
  - Mixed coalition
- 1994–present:
  - Centre-right coalition
  - Centre-left coalition
  - Mixed coalition

Portrait	Name (Born–Died)	Term of office			Party	Government	Ref.
Portrait	Name (Born–Died)	Took office	Left office	Time in office	Party	Government	Ref.
	Paolo Cappa (1888–1956)	13 July 1946	31 May 1947	322 days	Christian Democracy	De Gasperi II·III	
	Giulio Andreotti (1919–2013)	31 May 1947	18 January 1954	6 years, 232 days	Christian Democracy	De Gasperi IV·V·VI·VII·VIII; Pella	
	Mariano Rumor (1915–1990)	18 January 1954	10 February 1954	23 days	Christian Democracy	Fanfani I	
	Oscar Luigi Scalfaro (1918–2012)	10 February 1954	6 July 1955	1 year, 146 days	Christian Democracy	Scelba	
	Carlo Russo (1920–2007)	6 July 1955	19 May 1957	1 year, 317 days	Christian Democracy	Segni I	
	Lorenzo Spallino (1897–1962)	19 May 1957	1 July 1958	1 year, 43 days	Christian Democracy	Zoli	
	Antonio Maxia (1904–1962)	1 July 1958	16 February 1959	230 days	Christian Democracy	Fanfani II	
	Carlo Russo (1920–2007)	16 February 1959	25 March 1960	1 year, 38 days	Christian Democracy	Segni II	
	Alberto Folchi (1897–1977)	25 March 1960	26 July 1960	123 days	Christian Democracy	Tambroni	
	Umberto Delle Fave (1912–1986)	26 July 1960	21 June 1963	2 years, 330 days	Christian Democracy	Fanfani III·IV	
	Crescenzo Mazza (1910–1990)	21 June 1963	4 December 1963	166 days	Christian Democracy	Leone I	
	Angelo Salizzoni (1907–1992)	4 December 1963	24 June 1968	4 years, 203 days	Christian Democracy	Moro I·II·III	
	Luigi Michele Galli (1924–2001)	24 June 1968	12 December 1968	171 days	Christian Democracy	Leone II	
	Antonio Bisaglia (1929–1984)	12 December 1968	6 August 1970	1 year, 237 days	Christian Democracy	Rumor I	
	Antonio Bisaglia (1929–1984)	12 December 1968	6 August 1970	1 year, 237 days	Christian Democracy	Rumor II	
	Antonio Bisaglia (1929–1984)	12 December 1968	6 August 1970	1 year, 237 days	Christian Democracy	Rumor III	
	Dario Antoniozzi (1923–2019)	6 August 1970	17 February 1972	1 year, 195 days	Christian Democracy	Colombo	
	Franco Evangelisti (1923–1993)	17 February 1972	7 July 1973	1 year, 140 days	Christian Democracy	Andreotti I·II	
	Adolfo Sarti (1928–1992)	7 July 1973	23 November 1974	1 year, 139 days	Christian Democracy	Rumor IV·V	
	Angelo Salizzoni (1907–1992)	23 November 1974	29 July 1976	1 year, 249 days	Christian Democracy	Moro IV·V	
	Franco Evangelisti (1923–1993)	29 July 1976	4 August 1979	3 years, 6 days	Christian Democracy	Andreotti IV·V	
	Piergiorgio Bressani (1929–2022)	4 August 1979	18 October 1980	1 year, 75 days	Christian Democracy	Cossiga I	
	Piergiorgio Bressani (1929–2022)	4 August 1979	18 October 1980	1 year, 75 days	Christian Democracy	Cossiga II	
	Luciano Radi (1922–2014)	18 October 1980	28 June 1981	253 days	Christian Democracy	Forlani	
	Francesco Compagna (1921–1982)	28 June 1981	24 July 1982	1 year, 26 days	Italian Republican Party	Spadolini I	
	Vittorio Olcese (1925–1999)	23 August 1982	1 December 1982	100 days	Italian Republican Party	Spadolini II	
	Bruno Orsini (1929– )	1 December 1982	4 August 1983	246 days	Christian Democracy	Fanfani V	
	Giuliano Amato (1938– )	4 August 1983	18 April 1987	3 years, 247 days	Italian Socialist Party	Craxi I·II	
	Mauro Bubbico (1928–1991)	18 April 1987	29 July 1987	102 days	Christian Democracy	Fanfani VI	
	Emilio Rubbi (1930–2005)	29 July 1987	13 April 1988	259 days	Christian Democracy	Goria	
	Riccardo Misasi (1932–2000)	13 April 1988	22 July 1989	1 year, 100 days	Christian Democracy	De Mita	
	Nino Cristofori (1930–2015)	22 July 1989	28 June 1992	2 years, 342 days	Christian Democracy	Andreotti VI·VII	
	Fabio Fabbri (1933–2024)	28 June 1992	28 April 1993	304 days	Italian Socialist Party	Amato I	
	Antonio Maccanico (1924–2013)	28 April 1993	10 May 1994	1 year, 12 days	Italian Republican Party	Ciampi	
	Gianni Letta (1935– )	10 May 1994	17 January 1995	252 days	Forza Italia	Berlusconi I	
	Lamberto Cardia (1934–2026)	17 January 1995	17 May 1996	1 year, 121 days	Independent	Dini	
	Enrico Luigi Micheli (1938–2011)	17 May 1996	21 October 1998	2 years, 157 days	Italian People's Party	Prodi I	
	Franco Bassanini (1940– )	21 October 1998	22 December 1999	1 year, 62 days	Democrats of the Left	D'Alema I	
	Enrico Luigi Micheli (1938–2011)	22 December 1999	11 June 2001	1 year, 171 days	Italian People's Party	D'Alema II; Amato II	
	Gianni Letta (1935– )	11 June 2001	17 May 2006	4 years, 340 days	Forza Italia	Berlusconi II·III	
	Enrico Letta (1966– )	17 May 2006	8 May 2008	1 year, 357 days	The Daisy / Democratic Party	Prodi II	
	Gianni Letta (1935– )	8 May 2008	16 November 2011	3 years, 192 days	The People of Freedom	Berlusconi IV	
	Antonio Catricalà (1952–2021)	16 November 2011	28 April 2013	1 year, 163 days	Independent	Monti	
	Filippo Patroni Griffi (1955– )	28 April 2013	22 February 2014	300 days	Independent	Letta	
	Graziano Delrio (1960– )	22 February 2014	2 April 2015	1 year, 39 days	Democratic Party	Renzi	
	Claudio De Vincenti (1948– )	2 April 2015	12 December 2016	1 year, 268 days	Democratic Party	Renzi	
	Maria Elena Boschi (1981– )	12 December 2016	1 June 2018	1 year, 171 days	Democratic Party	Gentiloni	
	Giancarlo Giorgetti (1966– )	1 June 2018	5 September 2019	1 year, 96 days	League	Conte I	
	Riccardo Fraccaro (1981– )	5 September 2019	13 February 2021	1 year, 161 days	Five Star Movement	Conte II	
	Roberto Garofoli (1966– )	13 February 2021	22 October 2022	1 year, 251 days	Independent	Draghi	
	Alfredo Mantovano (1958– )	22 October 2022	Incumbent	3 years, 320 days	Independent	Meloni	

== See also ==
- Council of Ministers (Italy)
- Deputy Prime Minister of Italy
- List of prime ministers of Italy
- Lists of office-holders
- Politics of Italy
- Prime Minister of Italy
