= Quintieri =

Quintieri is an Italian locational surname, which originally meant a person from one of the places called Quinto in Italy. The word quinto is derived from the Latin quintus, meaning "fifth". The name may refer to:

- Adolfo Quintieri (1887–1970), Italian politician
- Damiano Quintieri (born 1990), Italian football player
- Quinto Quintieri (1894–1968), Italian engineer, banker and politician
- Raffaele Simone Quintieri (born 1982), Italian football player

== See also ==
- Quinteros
