= Sixth De Gasperi government =

5th government of the Italian Republic

De Gasperi VI Cabinet
- 5th Cabinet of Italy

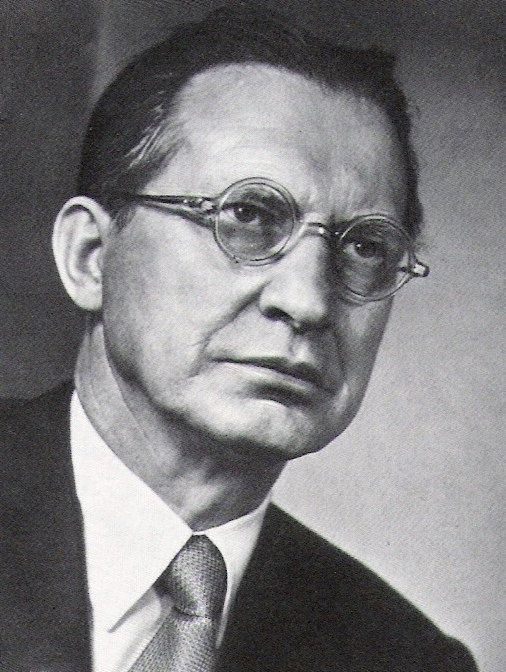
- Date formed: 27 January 1950
- Date dissolved: 26 July 1951

People and organisations
- Head of state: Luigi Einaudi
- Head of government: Alcide De Gasperi
- Member parties: DC, PSLI, PRI
- Status in legislature: Coalition government

History
- Legislature term: Legislature I (1948–1953)
- Predecessor: De Gasperi V Cabinet
- Successor: De Gasperi VII Cabinet

The sixth De Gasperi government held office in the Italian Republic from 27 January 1950 until 26 July 1951, a total of 558 days, or 1 year, 5 months and 29 days.

== Party breakdown ==
- Christian Democracy (DC): Prime minister, 12 ministers, 23 undersecretaries
- Socialist Party of Italian Workers (PSLI): 3 ministers, 4 undersecretaries
- Italian Republican Party (PRI): 2 ministers, 2 undersecretaries
- Independents: 1 minister

== Composition ==
Office	Name	Party	Term
Prime Minister	Alcide De Gasperi	DC	27 January 1950–26 July 1951
Minister of Foreign Affairs	Carlo Sforza	Independent	27 January 1950–26 July 1951
Minister of the Interior	Mario Scelba	DC	27 January 1950–26 July 1951
Minister of Italian Africa	Alcide De Gasperi (ad interim)	DC	27 January 1950–26 July 1951
Minister of Grace and Justice	Attilio Piccioni	DC	27 January 1950–26 July 1951
Minister of Budget	Giuseppe Pella (ad interim)	DC	27 January 1950–26 July 1951
Minister of Finance	Ezio Vanoni	DC	27 January 1950–26 July 1951
Minister of Treasury	Giuseppe Pella	DC	27 January 1950–26 July 1951
Minister of Defence	Randolfo Pacciardi	PRI	27 January 1950–26 July 1951
Minister of Public Education	Guido Gonella	DC	27 January 1950–26 July 1951
Minister of Public Works	Salvatore Aldisio	DC	27 January 1950–26 July 1951
Minister of Agriculture and Forests	Antonio Segni	DC	27 January 1950–26 July 1951
Minister of Transport	Ludovico D'Aragona	PSLI	27 January 1950–5 April 1951
Minister of Transport	Pietro Campilli	DC	5 April 1951–26 July 1951
Minister of Post and Telecommunications	Giuseppe Spataro	DC	27 January 1950–26 July 1951
Minister of Industry and Commerce	Giuseppe Togni	DC	27 January 1950–26 July 1951
Minister of Foreign Trade	Ivan Matteo Lombardo	PSLI	27 January 1950–5 April 1951
Minister of Foreign Trade	Ugo La Malfa	PRI	5 April 1951–26 July 1951
Minister of Merchant Navy	Alberto Simonini	PSLI	27 January 1950–5 April 1951
Minister of Merchant Navy	Raffaele Petrilli	DC	5 April 1951–26 July 1951
Minister of Labour and Social Security	Achille Marazza	DC	27 January 1950–26 July 1951
Minister without portfolio	Pietro Campilli	DC	27 January 1950–5 April 1951
Minister without portfolio	Ugo La Malfa	PRI	27 January 1950–5 April 1951
Minister without portfolio	Raffaele Petrilli	DC	27 January 1950–5 April 1951
Secretary of the Council of Ministers	Giulio Andreotti	DC	27 January 1950–26 July 1951
