= Mancini List =

Italian political party

PSE – Mancini List (PSE – Lista Mancini) was a regional social-democratic political party active in Calabria. The party was often referred to as PSE, Italian acronym for the Party of European Socialists and was led by Giacomo Mancini.

When the Italian Socialist Party (PSI) was dissolved in 1994, Mancini, a long-time politician, secretary of the PSI from 1970 to 1972 and Mayor of Cosenza since 1993, launched the party as a vehicle for local elections. In 1996 Mancini was re-elected Mayor of Cosenza also with the support of the Democratic Party of the Left (PDS) and other centre-left parties: he won 58.8% of the vote and the combined result of his personal list and the local Italian Socialists (SI) was 21.1%. Since that point PSE and PDS, which was transformed into the Democrats of the Left (DS) in 1998, formed a pact at the national level, under which Giacomo Mancini Jr., grandson of Mancini, was elected to the Italian Chamber of Deputies in 2001.

When Mancini died in 2002, Mancini Jr. succeeded him as party leader, while Eva Catizone, was elected Mayor of Cosenza in his place. In 2005 Mancini Jr. left the DS and led the party to a merger with the Italian Democratic Socialists (SDI), while Catizone joined the Southern Democratic Party (PDM). In 2006 Mancini Jr. was re-elected to the Chamber for the Rose in the Fist, a joint list of the SDI and the Italian Radicals, but failed to be re-elected in 2008.

In the 2000 regional election the party obtained only 1.5% of the vote in Calabria, but, five years later, it contributed to the good result of the SDI (6.8%) also with some elects. However the stronghold of the party has always been Cosenza, where even in 2002 it obtained 12.4% of the vote as late as in 2002. In 2006 Mancini Jr. won 29.9% of the vote in Cosenza municipal election, bringing the Rose in the Fist to 15.4% in the city, a record in Italy, and his personal list to 7.5%, but was defeated, ending the 13-year rule of the Mancini family in Cosenza.

In November 2008 Mancini Jr. left the Socialist Party (PS), the successor party of the SDI, and joined Forza Italia (FI) and, thus, The People of Freedom (PdL), declaring that that party was the natural home for social democrats in Italy, as the PS was a failure and the Democratic Party (PD) was too weak in front of populist Italy of Values (IdV) and far from being a centre-left reform party. Mancini received more than 60,000 votes but failed to get elected.
