= Mario Occhiuto =

Italian politician and architect

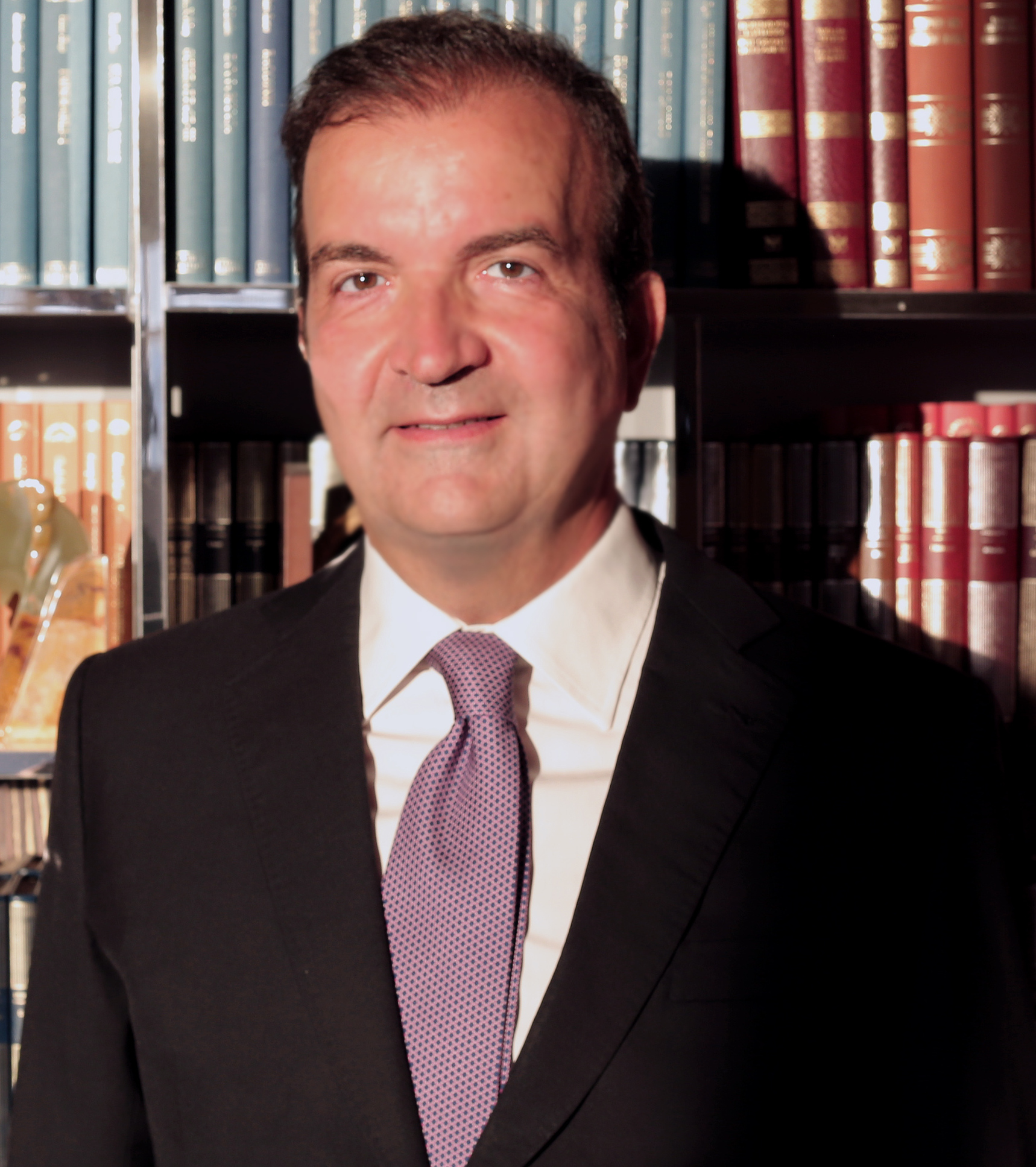
- Occhiuto in 2022

Mayor of Cosenza
- In office 31 May 2011 – 20 October 2021
- Preceded by: Salvatore Perugini
- Succeeded by: Franz Caruso

President of the Province of Cosenza
- In office 12 October 2014 – 11 February 2016
- Preceded by: Mario Oliverio
- Succeeded by: Franco Iacucci

Member of the Senate
- Incumbent
- Assumed office 13 October 2022
- Constituency: Calabria

Personal details
- Born: 6 January 1964 (age 62) Cosenza, Italy
- Party: Forza Italia
- Relatives: Roberto Occhiuto (brother)
- Education: University of Florence
- Occupation: Politician; Architect

Mario Occhiuto (born 6 January 1964) is an Italian politician and architect.

Occhiuto was born in Cosenza and trained as an architect at the University of Florence, graduating in 1987. He was elected Mayor of Cosenza in 2011 and President of the Province of Cosenza in 2014.

He was re-elected Mayor of Cosenza for a second term on 7 June 2016.
