= List of mayors of Cosenza =

Mayor of Cosenza
- Sindaco di Cosenza

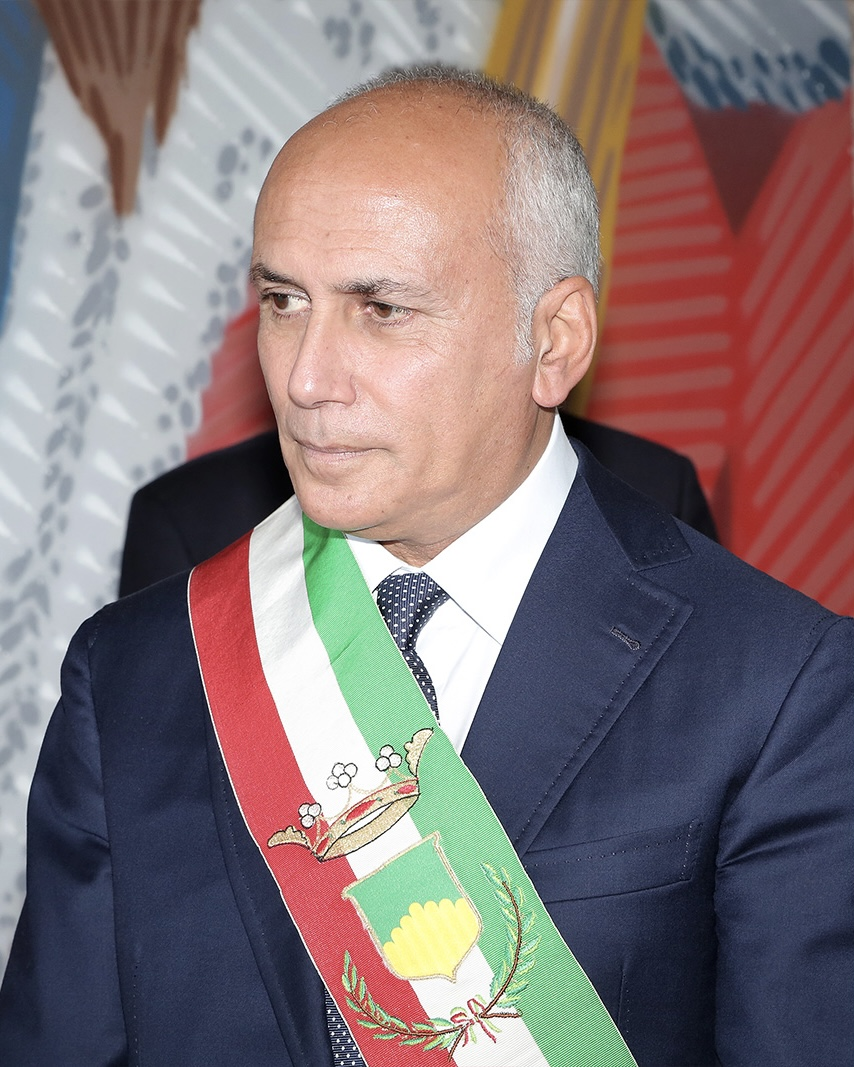
- Incumbent; Franz Caruso (PSI) since 20 October 2021
- Appointer: Popular election
- Term length: 5 years, renewable once
- Formation: 1860
- Website: Official website

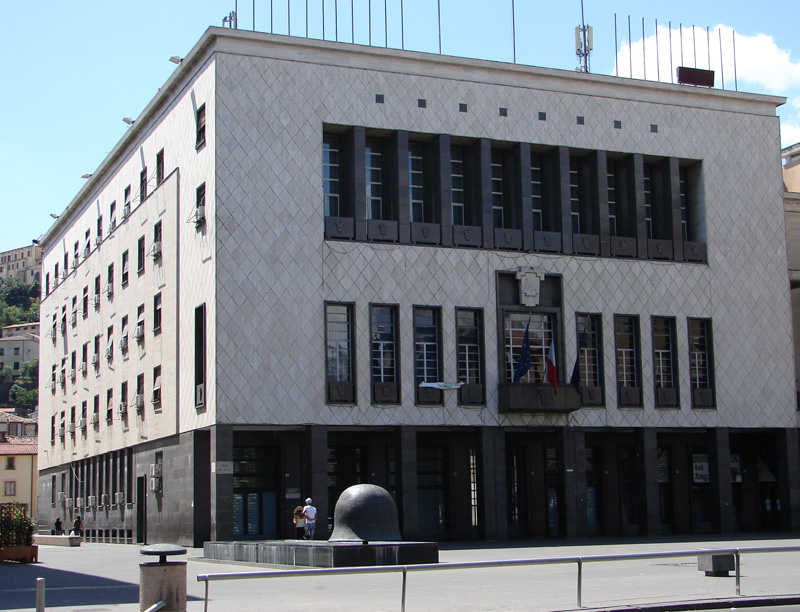
Cosenza's Town Hall.

The Mayor of Cosenza is an elected politician who, along with the Cosenza's city council, is accountable for the strategic government of Cosenza in Calabria, Italy.

The current mayor is Franz Caruso (PSI), who took office on 20 October 2021.

== Overview ==
According to the Italian Constitution, the mayor of Cosenza is member of the city council.

The mayor is elected by the population of Cosenza, who also elects the members of the city council, controlling the mayor's policy guidelines and is able to enforce his resignation by a motion of no confidence. The mayor is entitled to appoint and release the members of his government.

Since 1993 the mayor is elected directly by Cosenza's electorate: in all mayoral elections in Italy in cities with a population higher than 15,000 the voters express a direct choice for the mayor or an indirect choice voting for the party of the candidate's coalition. If no candidate receives at least 50% of votes, the top two candidates go to a second round after two weeks. The election of the City Council is based on a direct choice for the candidate with a preference vote: the candidate with the majority of the preferences is elected. The number of the seats for each party is determined proportionally.

== Italian Republic (since 1946) ==
=== City Council election (1946–1993) ===
From 1946 to 1993, the Mayor of Cosenza was elected by the City Council.

| | Mayor | Term start | Term end | Party |
|---|---|---|---|---|
| 1 | Adolfo Quintieri | 10 April 1946 | 23 February 1948 | DC |
| 2 | Alberto Serra | 23 February 1948 | 28 June 1952 | DC |
| 3 | Arnaldo Clausi Schettini | 28 June 1952 | 22 October 1962 | DC |
| 4 | Mario Stancati | 21 January 1963 | 11 November 1967 | DC |
Special Prefectural Commissioner tenure (11 November 1967 – 24 August 1970)
| 5 | Fausto Lio | 24 August 1970 | 29 July 1975 | DC |
| 6 | Battista Iacino | 29 July 1975 | 25 October 1980 | PSI |
| 7 | Antonio Rugiero | 25 October 1980 | 25 November 1982 | PSI |
| 8 | Pino Gentile | 25 November 1982 | 14 September 1985 | PSI |
| 9 | Giacomo Mancini | 14 September 1985 | 15 July 1986 | PSI |
| 10 | Francesco Santo | 15 July 1986 | 18 May 1989 | DC |
| 11 | Giuseppe Carratelli | 18 May 1989 | 10 August 1990 | DC |
| 12 | Pietro Mancini | 10 August 1990 | 20 December 1991 | PSI |
| (11) | Giuseppe Carratelli | 20 December 1991 | 16 June 1992 | DC |
| 13 | Piero Minutolo | 16 June 1992 | 31 August 1993 | DC |
Special Prefectural Commissioner tenure (31 August 1993 – 6 December 1993)

=== Direct election (since 1993) ===
Since 1993, under provisions of new local administration law, the Mayor of Cosenza is chosen by direct election, originally every four, and since 2000 every five years.

| | Mayor of Cosenza | Took office | Left office | Party | Coalition | Election |
|---|---|---|---|---|---|---|
| (9) | Giacomo Mancini (1916–2002) | 6 December 1993 | 17 November 1997 | PSI; SDI | PSI | 1993 |
| (9) | Giacomo Mancini (1916–2002) | 17 November 1997 | 8 April 2002 (Note: Died in office. The deputy Mayor Luciano Crea (Ind) held the office till a new municipal election was held.) | PSI; SDI | The Olive Tree (PDS-PPI-FL-SDI-PRC) | 1997 |
| 14 | Eva Catizzone (b. 1965) | 21 June 2002 | 25 January 2006 (Note: Resigned after suffering a vote of no confidence in the City Council.) | DS | The Olive Tree (DS-FdV-SDI-PdCI) | 2002 |
Special Prefectural Commissioner tenure (25 January 2006 – 15 June 2006)
| 15 | Salvatore Perugini (b. 1951) | 15 June 2006 | 31 May 2011 | PD | The Olive Tree (DS-DL-FdV-SDI-IdV) | 2006 |
| 16 | Mario Occhiuto (b. 1964) | 31 May 2011 | 7 June 2016 | PdL; FI | PdL • UDC • PL and right-wing lists | 2011 |
| 16 | Mario Occhiuto (b. 1964) | 7 June 2016 | 20 October 2021 | PdL; FI | FI and right-wing lists | 2016 |
| 17 | Franz Caruso (b. 1959) | 20 October 2021 (Note: Election originally scheduled for June 2021 then postponed due to the Coronavirus pandemic.) | Incumbent | PSI | PD • PSI and leftist lists | 2021 |
