= Jean-Marie Drot =

- Born: 2 March 1929; Nancy, France
- Died: 23 September 2015 (aged 86); Chatou, France
- Education: École Normale Supérieure
- Occupation: Writer

Jean-Marie Drot (2 March 1929 – 23 September 2015) was a French writer and documentary maker.

== Biography ==
Drot was born in Nancy, Meurthe-et-Moselle. He was the director of the French Academy in Rome from 1985 to 1994. Drot and Giovanni Pieraccini, an Italian socialist politician, founded an organization, RomaEuropa, which initiated the Romaeuropa Festival, a cultural festival. Drot is noted for his documentary work on Montparnasse.

== Publications ==
- Le Retour d'Ulysse manchot, éd. Julliard 1990 (ISBN 2260007414)
- Femme Lumière, éd. Deleatur 2000 (ISBN 2868070922)
- Dictionnaire vagabond, éd. Plon 2003 (ISBN 2259190324)
- Femmes hostie, éd. Gallilée 2006 (ISBN 2718605421)

== Films ==
- Les heures chaudes de Montparnasse (The hot hours in Montparnasse), Documentary series filmed in 1962 then presented in a new cut in 1987.
- Jeu d'echecs avec Marcel Duchamp (Games of Chess with Marcel Duchamp), Documentary filmed in 1963.
- Journal de voyage avec André Malraux (Journal of a journey with André Malraux), Documentary series of 13 episodes of 52 minutes, produced 1974–1975.
- Un homme parmi les hommes : Alberto Giacometti (A man among men : Alberto Giacometti)
