= List of presidents of the Province of Cosenza =

President of the Province of Cosenza
- Presidente della Provincia di Cosenza
- Incumbent; Biagio Faragalli since 9 March 2026
- Term length: 4 years
- Inaugural holder: Bonifacio Strigliani
- Formation: 1889

The president of the Province of Cosenza is the head of the provincial government in Cosenza, Calabria, Italy. The president oversees the administration of the province, coordinates the activities of the municipalities, and represents the province in regional and national matters.

Since March 2026, the office has been held by Biagio Faragalli of Forza Italia party.

== List ==
=== Presidents of the Provincial Deputation (1889–1927) ===
No.	Portrait	Name	Took office	Left office	Party
1		Bonifacio Strigliani	1889	1891	
2		Domenico Cardamone	1891	1895	
3		Ippolito Mirabello	1896	1902	
—		?	1902	1904	Prefectural Commissioner
4		Vincenzo Accattatis	1904	1909	
5		Pietro Pizzini	1909	1914	
6		Ignazio Pisani	1914	?	

=== Presidents of the Province (1951–present) ===
No.	Portrait	Name	Took office	Left office	Party
		?	?	?	?
		Eugenio Madeo	26 August 1985	7 August 1990	Italian Communist Party
		Domenico Tursi	7 August 1990	30 December 1991	Italian Communist Party
		Salvatore Magarò	6 March 1992	5 May 1994	Italian Socialist Party
		Antonio Acri	31 May 1994	8 May 1995	Democratic Party of the Left; Democrats of the Left
		Antonio Acri	8 May 1995	14 June 1999	Democratic Party of the Left; Democrats of the Left
		Antonio Acri	14 June 1999	14 June 2004	Democratic Party of the Left; Democrats of the Left
		Mario Oliverio	14 June 2004	23 June 2009	Democrats of the Left; Democratic Party
		Mario Oliverio	23 June 2009	12 October 2014	Democrats of the Left; Democratic Party
		Mario Occhiuto	12 October 2014	11 February 2016	Forza Italia
—		Franco Bruno (acting)	11 February 2016	18 May 2016	Brothers of Italy
—		Graziano Di Natale (acting)	18 May 2016	26 May 2016	Democratic Party
—		Franco Bruno (acting)	26 May 2016	8 July 2016	Brothers of Italy
—		Graziano Di Natale (acting)	8 July 2016	29 January 2017	Democratic Party
		Francesco Antonio Iacucci	29 January 2017	7 February 2021	Democratic Party
		Francesco Antonio Iacucci	7 February 2021	21 December 2021	Democratic Party
—		Ferdinando Nociti (acting)	21 December 2021	20 March 2022	Civic list
		Rosaria Succurro	20 March 2022	9 December 2025	Forza Italia
—		Giancarlo Lamensa (acting)	9 December 2025	9 March 2026	Independent
		Biagio Faragalli	9 March 2026	Incumbent	Forza Italia

== Sources ==
- "Storia amministrativa dell'ente". Ministero dell'Interno.
- Menichini, Piera (2005). "I presidenti delle Province dall'Unità alla Grande guerra: repertorio analitico". Storia Amministrazione Costituzione (13): 244–245.
