= Stefano Podestà =

Italian economist and politician (born 1939)

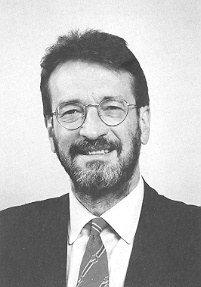

Minister of University, Scientific and Technological Research
- In office May 1994 – 1995
- Prime Minister: Silvio Berlusconi
- Preceded by: Umberto Colombo
- Succeeded by: Giorgio Salvini

Personal details
- Born: 1 August 1939 (age 87)

Stefano Podestà (born 1 August 1939) is a retired Italian academic. He was the vice-rector of Bocconi University in Milan before involving in politics. In the 1994 general election, Podestà was elected to the Chamber of Deputies as a member of Forza Italia. He served as the minister of university, scientific and technological research in the first cabinet of Prime Minister Silvio Berlusconi. Podestà was appointed to the post in May 1994 being one of the Northern League members in the cabinet. He replaced Umberto Colombo in the post. During his term, Podestà attempted to reform the established ways of the appointment of academics. Giorgio Salvini replaced Podestà in the post of minister of university, scientific and technological research. In 2011 Podestà was given the title of the emeritus professor in the field of management and technology at the University of Bocconi.

He has been the author and editor of various books and articles.
