= Achille Corona =

Italian politician (1914–1979)

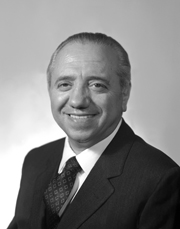

Minister of Environment
- In office 6 July 1973 – 13 March 1974
- Prime Minister: Mariano Rumor

Minister of Tourism and Entertainment
- In office 1963–1968
- Prime Minister: Aldo Moro

Personal details
- Born: 30 July 1914 Rome, Kingdom of Italy
- Died: 23 November 1979 (aged 65) Rome, Italy

Achille Corona (1914–1979) was an Italian socialist politician, lawyer and journalist. He served at the Italian Parliament and Senate. He was the minister of tourism and entertainment in the first, second and third cabinet of Prime Minister Aldo Moro between 1963 and 1968. He was the first socialist politician who held the post in Italy.

== Biography ==
Corona was born in Rome on 30 July 1914. He received a degree in law. He joined the Italian Socialist Party (PSI) in 1933. Corona became editor-in-chief of Avanti! newspaper during the Nazi occupation of Rome and was active in the Roman Resistance. He was arrested by the Nazis and imprisoned in Regina Coeli. After the Liberation he and Tullio Vecchietti together with others formed the group of Proletarian Unity in Rome. Corona was elected deputy for the PSI in the 1948 elections. From 1951 to 1958 he was also socialist municipal councilor of Pesaro.

Corona served as the head of the Local Authorities Office and of the International Office of the Directorate of the Italian Socialist Party. He was re-elected deputy in the years 1958, 1963 and 1968. He became a senator in 1972. He was appointed minister of tourism and entertainment to the cabinet led by Prime Minister Aldo Moro which he held between 1963 and 1968. Corona was part of the cabinet of Prime Minister Mariano Rumor as minister of environment in the period between 6 July 1973 and 13 March 1974. He died in Rome on 23 November 1979.
