= Attilio Piccioni =

Italian politician (1892–1976)

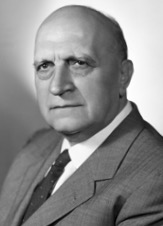

Deputy Prime Minister of Italy
- In office 26 July 1960 – 4 December 1963
- Prime Minister: Amintore Fanfani; Giovanni Leone
- In office 26 July 1951 – 17 August 1953
- Prime Minister: Alcide De Gasperi
- In office 23 May 1948 – 27 January 1950
- Prime Minister: Alcide De Gasperi

Minister of Foreign Affairs
- In office 29 May 1962 – 4 December 1963
- Prime Minister: Amintore Fanfani; Giovanni Leone
- Preceded by: Antonio Segni
- Succeeded by: Giuseppe Saragat
- In office 18 January 1954 – 19 September 1954
- Prime Minister: Amintore Fanfani; Mario Scelba
- Preceded by: Giuseppe Pella
- Succeeded by: Gaetano Martino

Minister of Justice
- In office 27 January 1950 – 19 July 1951
- Prime Minister: Alcide De Gasperi
- Preceded by: Giuseppe Grassi
- Succeeded by: Adone Zoli

Secretary of the Christian Democracy
- In office 22 September 1946 – 10 January 1949
- Preceded by: Alcide De Gasperi
- Succeeded by: Paolo Emilio Taviani
Parliamentary offices
Member of the Senate of the Republic
In office 12 June 1958 – 10 March 1976
Constituency	Lombardy (1958–1963); Lazio (1963–1976)
Member of the Chamber of Deputies
In office 8 May 1948 – 11 June 1958
Constituency	Florence
Member of the Constituent Assembly
In office 25 June 1946 – 31 January 1948
Constituency	Italy at-large

Personal details
- Born: 14 June 1892 Poggio Bustone, Italy
- Died: 10 March 1976 (aged 83) Rome, Italy
- Party: Christian Democracy
- Children: Piero Piccioni; Leone Piccioni
- Education: Sapienza University of Rome
- Profession: Politician, lawyer

Attilio Piccioni (14 July 1892 – 10 March 1976) was an Italian politician. He had been a prominent member of the Christian Democracy.

== Biography ==
Piccioni was born on 14 July 1892 in Poggio Bustone (Province of Rieti, Umbria) and graduated in Law at the Sapienza University of Rome. He participated in the First World War, first as an officer of the Bersaglieri, then as a vehicle instructor.

After the War Piccioni moved to Turin, where he married, and joined the Italian People's Party (PPI). He became secretary of the Turin section of PPI and member of its National Council.

With the advent of fascism in power, in 1926, after the forced dissolution of the PPI, he moved to Pistoia, where he resumed practicing as a lawyer and became a widower. In 1943 he was a member of the National Liberation Committee of Tuscany.

After the end of the Second World War he moved to Rome and on 2 June 1946 he was elected to the Constituent Assembly among the ranks of the Christian Democrats (DC). He was part of the "Commission of 75" in charge of drawing up and proposing the draft Constitution of the Italian Republic.

A trusted man of Alcide De Gasperi, Piccioni was the political secretary of DC from 1946 to 1949 and Deputy Prime Minister in the fifth, seventh and eighth De Gasperi government. He also served as Minister of Grace and Justice in the sixth De Gasperi government.

After the rejection of the trust by the Chamber of Deputies to the eighth De Gasperi government (28 July 1953), Piccioni was commissioned by the President of the Republic Luigi Einaudi to form the new government. However he had to give up the office, since he failed to form a majority in the Parliament.

Subsequently Piccioni was appointed Minister of Foreign Affairs in the brief first Fanfani government (January–February 1954), after which he was summoned again by President Einaudi to succeed Fanfani as Prime Minister. Piccioni, however, did not want to take on this responsibility due to the alleged involvement of his son Piero, a composer, in the case of Wilma Montesi, a Roman woman found dead on the beach in Torvaianica; thus he was confirmed as Minister of Foreign Affairs in the new Scelba Government. On 26 March 1954, the Montesi case (initially filed) was officially reopened by the Rome Court of Appeal. Because of this scandal, on 19 September Piccioni resigned as Minister of Foreign Affairs and from all his offices. Two days later, his son Piero was arrested on charges of manslaughter and drug use and then imprisoned in the Regina Coeli prison. Piero obtained provisional freedom after three months in preventive detention and was finally cleared of all charges.

In the years 1956–57, Piccioni was the head of the Italian delegation to the United Nations.

He served again as Deputy Prime Minister in the third (1960–1962) and fourth Fanfani government (1962–1963), in which he also assumed the office of Minister of Foreign Affairs, to replace Antonio Segni, who became President of the Republic. He was again Deputy Prime Minister and Minister of Foreign Affairs in the first Leone government (1963) and Minister without portfolio in the I, II, and III Moro government (1963–1968).

He died in Rome on 10 March 1976 at the age of 83.

== Electoral history ==
Election	House	Constituency	Party	Votes	Result
1946	Constituent Assembly	Italy at-large	DC	– (Note: Elected in a closed list proportional representation system.)	Elected
1948	Chamber of Deputies	Italy at-large	DC	–	Elected
1953	Chamber of Deputies	Florence–Pistoia	DC	23,781	Elected
1958	Senate of the Republic	Lombardy – Sondrio	DC	44,693	Elected
1963	Senate of the Republic	Lazio – Viterbo	DC	35,478	Elected
1968	Senate of the Republic	Lazio – Rome V	DC	31,079	Elected
1972	Senate of the Republic	Lazio – Rome V	DC	32,386	Elected
