= Deputy Prime Minister of Italy =

Position in the Italian government

Vice President of the Council of Ministers of the Italian Republic
- Vicepresidente del Consiglio dei Ministri della Repubblica Italiana

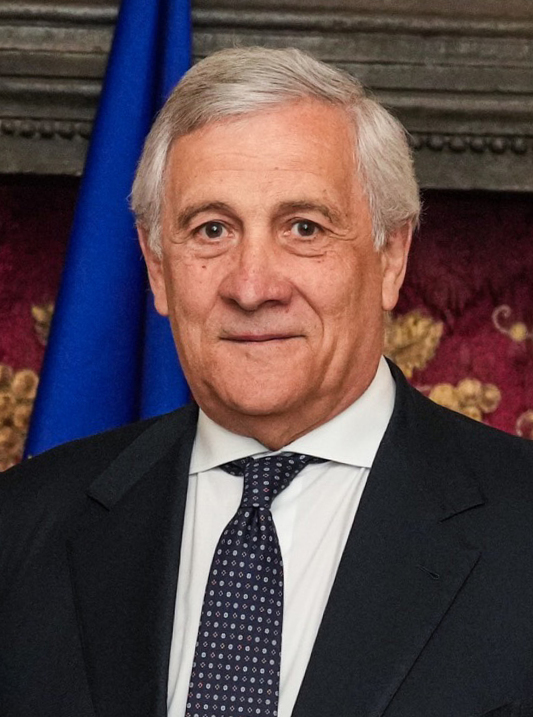
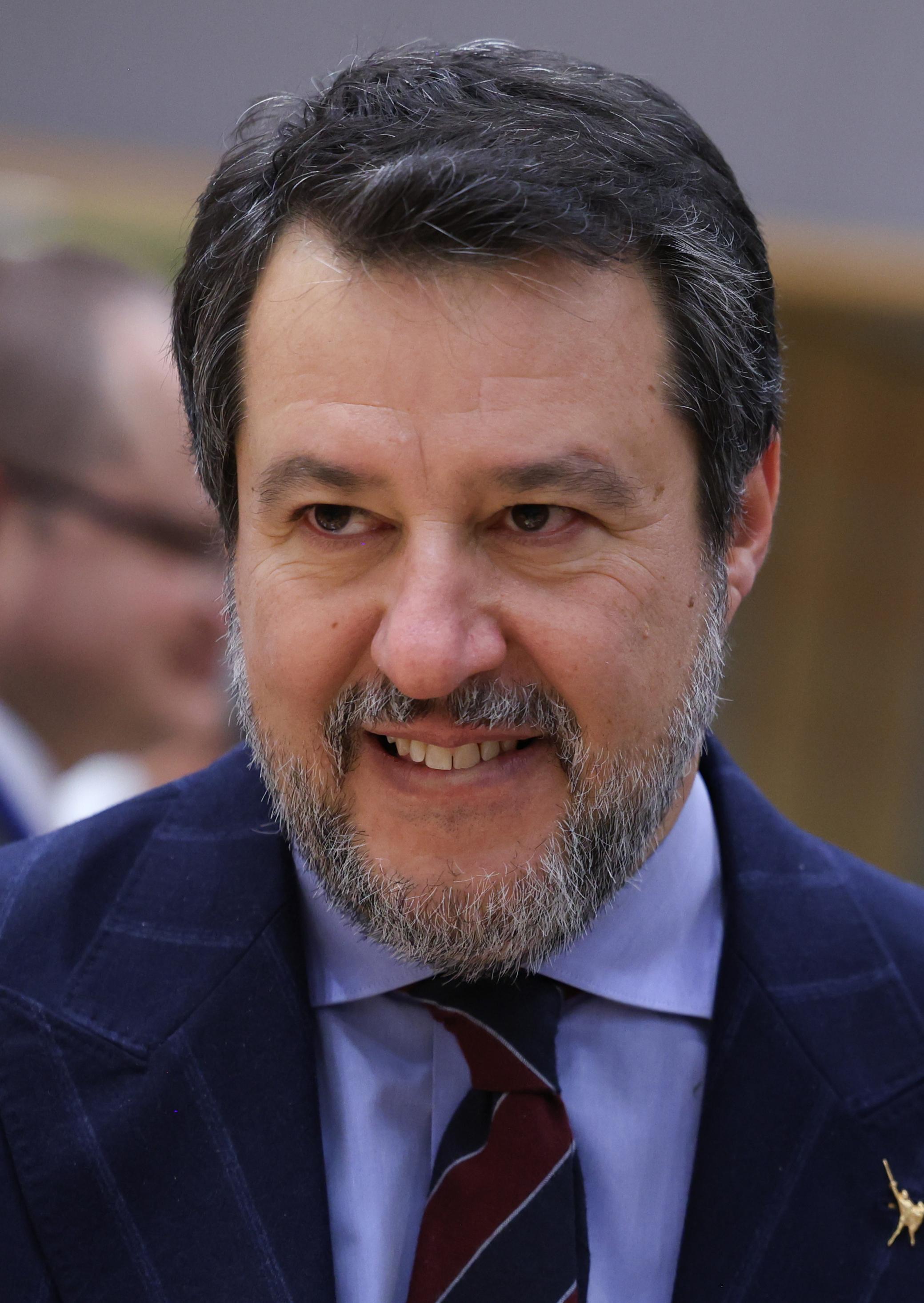
- Incumbent; Antonio Tajani and Matteo Salvini since 22 October 2022
- Council of Ministers
- Nominator: Prime Minister of Italy
- Appointer: Council of Ministers
- Inaugural holder: Palmiro Togliatti
- Formation: April 24, 1944; 82 years ago

The deputy prime minister of Italy, officially the vice president of the Council of Ministers of the Italian Republic (Italian: Vicepresidente del Consiglio dei ministri della Repubblica Italiana), is a senior member of the Italian Cabinet. Moreover, it is often colloquially known as vicepremier. The office of the Deputy Prime Minister is not a permanent position, existing only at the discretion of the Prime Minister, who may appoint to other offices to give seniority to a particular Cabinet minister. The office is currently held by Matteo Salvini and Antonio Tajani under Giorgia Meloni's premiership.

The office is not mentioned in the Constitution. Its role is defined by statutory provisions, most importantly article 8 of law no. 400 of 1998 (Italian: legge n. 400 del 1998). The Deputy Prime Minister assumes the powers of the Prime Minister if the latter becomes unable to discharge his or her duties. In case none was appointed Deputy Prime Minister, it is the eldest Minister who takes upon the role of the Prime Minister in such cases; meanwhile, if there are multiple Deputy Prime Ministers serving at the same time, it falls upon the eldest of them who does so. The Deputy Prime Minister does not automatically succeed the Prime Minister in case the latter resigns, as conventionally, in the aftermath of a resignation, the outgoing Prime Minister remains in place to handle day-to-day business until Parliament picks a successor.

In practice, the designation of someone to the role of Deputy Prime Minister may also provide additional practical status within cabinet, enabling the exercise of de facto, if not de jure, power. In a coalition government, as Enrico Letta Grand coalition government between the Democrats and The People of Freedom, the appointment of the secretary of the smaller party (in the 2014 case, Angelino Alfano, secretary of the PdL) as Deputy Prime Minister is done to give that person more authority within the cabinet to enforce the coalition's agreed-upon agenda.

== List of deputy prime ministers ==
=== Kingdom of Italy ===
Parties

- 1944–1946:
  - Italian Communist Party
  - Christian Democracy
  - Italian Socialist Party
  - Italian Liberal Party

Coalitions

- 1944–1946:
  - National Liberation Committee

Prime Ministers of the Kingdom of Italy (1861–1946)
Portrait	Name (Birth–Death)	Term of office			Party	Cabinet	Ref.
Portrait	Name (Birth–Death)	Took office	Left office	Time in office	Party	Cabinet	Ref.
	Palmiro Togliatti (1893–1964)	24 April 1944	18 June 1944	55 days	Italian Communist Party	Badoglio II	
Office not in use		18 June 1944 – 12 December 1944				Bonomi II	
	Palmiro Togliatti (1893–1964)	12 December 1944	21 June 1945	1 year, 9 days	Italian Communist Party	Bonomi III	
	Giulio Rodinò (1875–1946)	12 December 1944	21 June 1945	1 year, 9 days	Christian Democracy	Bonomi III	
	Pietro Nenni (1891–1980)	21 June 1945	10 December 1945	172 days	Italian Socialist Party	Parri	
	Manlio Brosio (1897–1980)	21 June 1945	10 December 1945	172 days	Italian Liberal Party	Parri	
	Pietro Nenni (1891–1980)	10 December 1945	13 July 1946	262 days	Italian Socialist Party	De Gasperi I	

=== Italian Republic ===
Parties

- 1946–1994:
  - Italian Liberal Party
  - Italian Republican Party
  - Italian Democratic Socialist Party
  - Christian Democracy
  - Italian Socialist Party
- 1994–present:
  - Lega Nord / League
  - National Alliance
  - Democratic Party of the Left
  - Italian People's Party
  - Union of Christian and Centre Democrats
  - Forza Italia / The People of Freedom
  - Democratic Party
  - New Centre-Right
  - Five Star Movement

Coalitions

- 1946–1994:
  - Centrist coalition
  - Organic centre-left
  - Pentapartito / Quadripartito
  - Mixed coalition
- 1994–present:
  - Centre-right coalition
  - Centre-left coalition
  - Mixed coalition

Prime Ministers of the Kingdom of Italy (1861–1946)
Portrait	Name (Birth–Death)	Term of office			Party	Cabinet	Ref.
Portrait	Name (Birth–Death)	Took office	Left office	Time in office	Party	Cabinet	Ref.
	Luigi Einaudi (1874–1961)	31 May 1947	23 May 1948	358 days	Italian Liberal Party	De Gasperi IV	
	Randolfo Pacciardi (1899–1991)	31 May 1947	23 May 1948	358 days	Italian Republican Party	De Gasperi IV	
	Giuseppe Saragat (1898–1988)	31 May 1947	23 May 1948	358 days	Italian Democratic Socialist Party	De Gasperi IV	
	Attilio Piccioni (1892–1976)	23 May 1948	27 January 1950	1 year, 249 days	Christian Democracy	De Gasperi V	
	Giovanni Porzio (1873–1962)	23 May 1948	27 January 1950	1 year, 249 days	Italian Liberal Party	De Gasperi V	
	Giuseppe Saragat (1898–1988)	23 May 1948	27 January 1950	1 year, 249 days	Italian Democratic Socialist Party	De Gasperi V	
Office not in use		27 January 1950 – 26 July 1951				De Gasperi VI	
	Attilio Piccioni (1892–1976)	26 July 1951	17 August 1953	2 years, 22 days	Christian Democracy	De Gasperi VII·VIII	
Office not in use		17 August 1953 – 10 February 1954				Pella; Fanfani I	
	Giuseppe Saragat (1898–1988)	10 February 1954	19 May 1957	3 years, 98 days	Italian Democratic Socialist Party	Scelba; Segni I	
	Giuseppe Pella (1902–1981)	19 May 1957	1 July 1958	1 year, 43 days	Christian Democracy	Zoli	
	Antonio Segni (1891–1972)	1 July 1958	16 February 1959	229 days	Christian Democracy	Fanfani II	
Office not in use		16 February 1959 – 26 July 1960				Segni II; Tambroni	
	Attilio Piccioni (1892–1976)	26 July 1960	4 December 1963	3 years, 131 days	Christian Democracy	Fanfani III·IV; Leone I	
	Pietro Nenni (1891–1980)	4 December 1963	24 June 1968	4 years, 203 days	Italian Socialist Party	Moro I·II·III	
Office not in use		24 June 1968 – 12 December 1968				Leone I	
	Francesco De Martino (1907–2002)	12 December 1968	5 August 1969	236 days	Italian Socialist Party	Rumor I	
	Paolo Emilio Taviani (1912–2001)	5 August 1969	27 March 1970	234 days	Christian Democracy	Rumor II	
	Francesco De Martino (1907–2002)	27 March 1970	17 February 1972	1 year, 327 days	Italian Socialist Party	Rumor II; Colombo	
Office not in use		17 February 1972 – 26 June 1972				Andreotti I	
	Mario Tanassi (1916–2007)	26 June 1972	7 July 1973	1 year, 11 days	Italian Democratic Socialist Party	Andreotti II	
Office not in use		7 July 1973 – 23 November 1974				Rumor IV·V	
	Ugo La Malfa (1903–1979)	23 November 1974	12 February 1976	1 year, 81 days	Italian Republican Party	Moro IV	
Office not in use		12 February 1976 – 20 March 1979				Moro V Andreotti III·IV	
	Ugo La Malfa (1903–1979)	20 March 1979	26 March 1979	6 days	Italian Republican Party	Andreotti V	
Office not in use		26 March 1979 – 4 August 1983				Cossiga I	
Office not in use		26 March 1979 – 4 August 1983				Cossiga II; Forlani	
Office not in use		26 March 1979 – 4 August 1983				Spadolini I·II; Fanfani V	
	Arnaldo Forlani (1925–2023)	4 August 1983	18 April 1987	3 years, 257 days	Christian Democracy	Craxi I·II	
Office not in use		18 April 1987 – 29 July 1987				Fanfani VI	
	Giuliano Amato (1938–)	29 July 1987	13 April 1988	259 days	Italian Socialist Party	Goria	
	Gianni De Michelis (1940–2019)	13 April 1988	22 July 1989	1 year, 100 days	Italian Socialist Party	De Mita	
	Claudio Martelli (1943–)	22 July 1989	28 June 1992	2 years, 342 days	Italian Socialist Party	Andreotti VI·VII	
Office not in use		28 June 1992 – 10 May 1994				Amato I	
Office not in use		28 June 1992 – 10 May 1994				Ciampi	
	Roberto Maroni (1955–2022)	10 May 1994	17 January 1995	252 days	Lega Nord	Berlusconi I	
	Giuseppe Tatarella (1935–1999)	10 May 1994	17 January 1995	252 days	National Alliance	Berlusconi I	
Office not in use		17 January 1995 – 17 May 1996				Dini	
	Walter Veltroni (1955–)	17 May 1996	21 October 1998	2 years, 157 days	Democratic Party of the Left	Prodi I	
	Sergio Mattarella (1941–)	21 October 1998	22 December 1999	1 year, 62 days	Italian People's Party	D'Alema I	
Office not in use		22 December 1999 – 11 June 2001				D'Alema II; Amato II	
	Gianfranco Fini (1952–)	11 June 2001	23 April 2005	3 years, 316 days	National Alliance	Berlusconi II	
	Marco Follini (1954–)	2 December 2004	23 April 2005	142 days	Union of Christians and Centre Democrats	Berlusconi II	
	Gianfranco Fini (1952–)	23 April 2005	17 May 2006	1 year, 24 days	National Alliance	Berlusconi III	
	Giulio Tremonti (1947–)	23 April 2005	17 May 2006	1 year, 24 days	Forza Italia	Berlusconi III	
	Massimo D'Alema (1949–)	17 May 2006	8 May 2008	1 year, 357 days	Democrats of the Left / Democratic Party	Prodi II	
	Francesco Rutelli (1954–)	17 May 2006	8 May 2008	1 year, 357 days	The Daisy / Democratic Party	Prodi II	
Office not in use		8 May 2008 – 28 April 2013				Berlusconi IV	
Office not in use		8 May 2008 – 28 April 2013				Monti	
	Angelino Alfano (1970–)	28 April 2013	22 February 2014	300 days	The People of Freedom / New Centre-Right	Letta	
Office not in use		22 February 2014 – 1 June 2018				Renzi; Gentiloni	
	Matteo Salvini (1973–)	1 June 2018	5 September 2019	1 year, 96 days	League	Conte I	
	Luigi Di Maio (1986–)	1 June 2018	5 September 2019	1 year, 96 days	Five Star Movement	Conte I	
Office not in use		5 September 2019 – 22 October 2022				Conte II; Draghi	
	Antonio Tajani (1953–)	22 October 2022	Incumbent	3 years, 320 days	Forza Italia	Meloni	
	Matteo Salvini (1973–)	22 October 2022	Incumbent	3 years, 320 days	League	Meloni	

== See also ==
- Prime Minister of Italy
- List of prime ministers of Italy
- Politics of Italy
- Lists of incumbents
