= Biagio Faragalli =

Italian politician (born 1985)

President of the Province of Cosenza
- Incumbent
- Assumed office 9 March 2026
- Preceded by: Rosaria Succurro

Mayor of Montalto Uffugo
- Incumbent
- Assumed office 28 June 2024
- Preceded by: Pietro Caracciolo

Personal details
- Born: Biagio Antonio Faragalli; 21 August 1985 (age 41) Cosenza, Calabria, Italy
- Party: Union of the Centre; Forza Italia
- Occupation: Pharmacist

Biagio Antonio Faragalli (born 21 August 1985) is an Italian politician serving as president of the Province of Cosenza since 2026. He has served as mayor of Montalto Uffugo since 2024.

In the 2026 provincial election, Faragalli was supported by the centre-right coalition of Forza Italia, Brothers of Italy, Lega, Us Moderates, Italy of Values and the Union of the Centre. He was elected president of the Province of Cosenza with 50.75% of the weighted vote, defeating centre-left candidate Franz Caruso, who received 49.25%.
