= Adolfo Quintieri =

Italian politician (1887–1970)

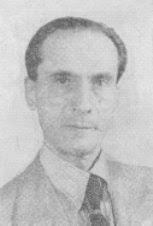

Mayor of Cosenza
- In office 1946–1948
- Preceded by: Francesco Vaccaro
- Succeeded by: Alberto Serra

Member of the Constituent Assembly
- In office 1946–1948

Member of the Chamber of Deputies
- In office 1948–1953

Personal details
- Born: 22 June 1887; Cosenza, Calabria, Italy
- Died: 13 July 1970 (aged 83); Cosenza, Calabria, Italy
- Political party: Christian Democracy
- Education: Degree in Law
- Occupation: Lawyer

Adolfo Quintieri (22 May 1887 – 13 July 1970) was an Italian politician who served as Mayor of Cosenza (1946–1948), member of the Constituent Assembly (1946–1948) and Deputy (1948–1953).
