= Giovanni Pieraccini =

Italian journalist and politician (1918–2017)

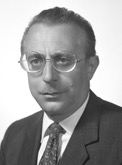

Minister for the Coordination of Scientific and Technological Research Initiatives
- In office 14 March 1974 – November 1974
- Prime Minister: Mariano Rumor

Minister of Merchant Navy
- In office 1973 – 14 March 1974
- Prime Minister: Mariano Rumor

Minister of Budget
- In office 1964–1968
- Prime Minister: Aldo Moro

Minister of Public Works
- In office December 1963 – July 1964
- Prime Minister: Aldo Moro
- Preceded by: Fiorentino Sullo
- Succeeded by: Giacomo Mancini

Personal details
- Born: 25 November 1918 Viareggio, Kingdom of Italy
- Died: 14 July 2017 (aged 98) Viareggio, Italy
- Party: Italian Socialist Party
- Education: University of Pisa

Giovanni Pieraccini (25 November 1918 – 14 July 2017) was an Italian journalist and socialist politician who was a member of the Italian Socialist Party. Starting his political career in 1948, Pieraccini served in different cabinet posts in the period 1963–1974.

== Early life and education ==
Pieraccini was born in Viareggio on 25 November 1918. He was given the name of his father who had died before his birth.

Pieraccini completed his high school education at the Carducci gymnasium in Viareggio. He graduated from the University of Pisa obtaining a law degree. Pieraccini participated in the resistance forces in Florence after 8 September 1943.

== Career ==
After the liberation of Florence Pieraccini was made the councilor of the first democratic administration and worked as the director of a socialist weekly entitled La defense. He was editor of the newspaper of the Resistance forces entitled La Nazione del Popolo and co-director of another newspaper, Il Nuovo corriere.

Pieraccini was a deputy from 1948 to 1968. He was part of the group which assumed the leadership of the Italian Socialist Party and director of the newspaper Avanti! from 1960 to 1963. In the late 1960s Pieraccini was part of the right-wing group in the party together with Pietro Nenni and Mario Zagari. He was appointed minister of public works to the first cabinet of Prime Minister Aldo Moro in December 1963 and was in office until 23 July 1964. He served as the minister of budget in the second and third Moro cabinet (1964-1968). Pieraccini was a member of the Italian Senate from 1968 to 1976 and was the head of the socialist group at the Senate. He was appointed minister of merchant navy to the cabinet led by Mariano Rumor in 1973 and was in office until 14 March 1974. Then Pieraccini was named the minister for the coordination of scientific and technological research initiatives on 14 March 1974 to the next cabinet of Mariano Rumor which he held until November that year.

Following his retirement from politics in 1974 Pieraccini served as the president of the Assitalia insurance company in 1983 and president of the SEC Naval Shipyard in Viareggio. In 1986 he founded an organization with Jean-Marie Drot called RomaEuropa which initiated the Romaeuropa Festival, a cultural festival.

== Death ==
Pieraccini died in Viareggio on 14 July 2017 at the age of 98.
