= Carlo Arnaudi =

Italian politician (1899–1970)

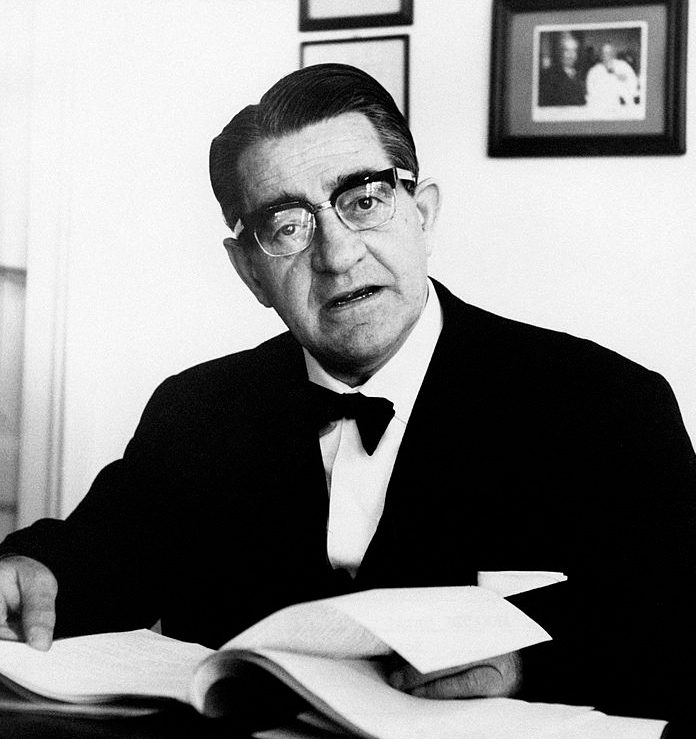
- Carlo Arnaudi in 1964

Minister for Scientific Research
- In office 1963–1966
- Prime Minister: Aldo Moro
- Preceded by: Office established

Personal details
- Born: 23 May 1899 Turin, Italy
- Died: 23 April 1970 (aged 70) Milan, Italy
- Spouse

Academic work
- Discipline: Biologist
- Sub-discipline: Microbiology
- Institutions: University of Milan

Carlo Arnaudi (23 May 1899 – 23 April 1970) was an Italian microbiologist and socialist politician, who served as the first minister for science of Italy and was one of the members of the Italian Senate. He is also known for his studies in the field of microbiology which produced the discovery of certain steroid-conversion processes in microorganisms.

== Biography ==
Arnaudi was born in Turin on 23 May 1899. He worked as professor of microbiology at the University of Milan. He was the head of Istituto Microbiologia Agraria e Tecnica. In 1940, he launched a scientific journal on microbiology, namely Annali di Microbiologia. He was the major political supporter of the International Laboratory of Genetics and Biophysics (ILGB) that was founded in Naples in 1962. He also headed the Casa della Cultura in Milan.

He also served as senator. He was appointed minister for scientific research to the center-left coalition government led by Prime Minister Aldo Moro in December 1963. He proposed that the ministry should be institutionalized in order to make it more effective in coordinating research activities. However, this proposal led to severe criticisms due to power struggle among the ministers. After serving in the post in the second cabinet of Aldo Moro, Carlo Arnaudi was removed from office in a cabinet reshuffle in February 1966. He died in Milan on 23 April 1970.
