= Minister of Public Works (Italy) =

Ministry in the Cabinet of Italy

This is a list of Italian ministers of public works. The list shows also the ministers that served under the same office but with other names, in fact this ministry has changed name many times.

== List of ministers ==
Parties

- 1946-1994:

Socialist Party Communist Party Christian Democracy Democratic Socialist Party Republican Party

- Since 1994:

Forza Italia/The People of Freedom The Democrats People's Party Party of Italian Communists Italy of Values New Centre-Right Democratic Party Five Star Movement Independent

Governments

Centrist coalition Centre-right coalition Centre-left coalition Mixed coalition

Name (Born–Died)	Portrait	Term of office		Political party	Government
Minister of Public Works
Giuseppe Romita (1887–1958)		14 July 1946	28 January 1947	Italian Socialist Party	De Gasperi II
Emilio Sereni (1907–1977)		2 February 1947	31 May 1947	Italian Communist Party	De Gasperi III
Umberto Tupini (1889–1973)		31 May 1947	14 January 1950	Christian Democracy	De Gasperi IV·V
Salvatore Aldisio (1890–1964)		27 January 1950	7 July 1953	Christian Democracy	De Gasperi VI·VII
Giuseppe Spataro (1897–1979)		16 July 1953	2 August 1953	Christian Democracy	De Gasperi VIII
Umberto Merlin (1885–1964)		17 August 1953	8 February 1954	Christian Democracy	Pella; Fanfani I
Giuseppe Romita (1887–1958)		10 February 1954	15 May 1957	Italian Democratic Socialist Party	Scelba; Segni I
Giuseppe Togni (1903–1981)		19 May 1957	26 July 1960	Christian Democracy	Zoli; Fanfani II; Segni II; Tambroni
Benigno Zaccagnini (1912–1989)		26 July 1960	21 February 1962	Christian Democracy	Fanfani III
Fiorentino Sullo (1921–2000)		21 February 1962	4 December 1963	Christian Democracy	Fanfani IV; Leone I
Giovanni Pieraccini (1918–2017)		4 December 1963	22 July 1964	Italian Democratic Socialist Party	Moro I
Giacomo Mancini (1916–2002)		22 July 1964	4 June 1968	Italian Democratic Socialist Party	Moro II·III
Lorenzo Natali (1922–1989)		24 June 1968	12 December 1968	Christian Democracy	Leone II
Giacomo Mancini (1916–2002)		12 December 1968	5 August 1969	Italian Democratic Socialist Party	Rumor I
Lorenzo Natali (1922–1989)		5 August 1969	27 March 1970	Christian Democracy	Rumor II
Salvatore Lauricella (1922–1996)		27 March 1970	17 February 1972	Italian Democratic Socialist Party	Rumor III; Colombo
Mario Ferrari Aggradi (1916–1997)		17 February 1972	26 June 1972	Christian Democracy	Andreotti I
Antonino Pietro Gullotti (1922–1989)		26 June 1972	7 July 1973	Christian Democracy	Andreotti II
Salvatore Lauricella (1922–1996)		7 July 1973	23 November 1974	Italian Democratic Socialist Party	Rumor IV·V
Pietro Bucalossi (1905–1992)		23 November 1974	12 February 1976	Italian Republican Party	Moro IV
Antonino Pietro Gullotti (1922–1989)		12 February 1976	11 March 1978	Christian Democracy	Moro V
Antonino Pietro Gullotti (1922–1989)		12 February 1976	11 March 1978	Christian Democracy	Andreotti III
Gaetano Stammati (1908–2002)		11 March 1978	20 March 1979	Christian Democracy	Andreotti IV
Francesco Compagna (1921–1982)		20 March 1979	4 August 1979	Italian Republican Party	Andreotti V
Franco Nicolazzi (1924–2015)		4 August 1979	4 April 1980	Italian Democratic Socialist Party	Cossiga I
Francesco Compagna (1921–1982)		4 April 1989	18 October 1980	Italian Republican Party	Cossiga II
Franco Nicolazzi (1924–2015)		18 October 1980	17 April 1987	Italian Democratic Socialist Party	Forlani; Spadolini I·II; Fanfani V Craxi I·II
Giuseppe Zamberletti (1933–2019)		28 April 1987	28 July 1987	Christian Democracy	FanfaniI VI
Emilio De Rose (1939–2018)		28 July 1987	13 April 1988	Italian Democratic Socialist Party	Goria
Enrico Ferri (1942–2020)		13 April 1988	22 July 1989	Italian Democratic Socialist Party	De Mita
Giovanni Prandini (1940–2018)		22 July 1989	28 June 1992	Christian Democracy	Andreotti VI·VII
Francesco Merloni (1925–2024)		28 June 1992	10 May 1994	Christian Democracy	Amato I
Francesco Merloni (1925–2024)		28 June 1992	10 May 1994	Christian Democracy	Ciampi
Roberto Maria Radice (1938–2012)		10 May 1994	17 January 1995	Forza Italia	Berlusconi I
Paolo Baratta (1939– )		17 January 1995	17 May 1996	Independent	Dini
Antonio Di Pietro (1950– )		17 May 1996	20 November 1996	Independent	Prodi I
Paolo Costa (1943– )		20 November 1996	21 October 1998	Movement for the Olive Tree	Prodi I
Enrico Luigi Micheli (1938–2011)		21 October 1998	22 December 1999	Italian People's Party	D'Alema I
Willer Bordon (1949–2015)		22 December 1999	25 April 2000	The Democrats	D'Alema II
Nerio Nesi (1925–2024)		25 April 2000	11 June 2001	Party of Italian Communists	Amato II
Minister of Infrastructures and Transports
Pietro Lunardi (1939– )		11 June 2001	17 May 2006	Forza Italia	Berlusconi II·III
Minister of Infrastructures
Antonio Di Pietro (1950– )		17 May 2006	8 May 2008	Italy of Values	Prodi II
Minister of Infrastructures and Transports
Altero Matteoli (1940–2017)		8 May 2008	16 November 2011	The People of Freedom	Berlusconi IV
Corrado Passera (1954– )		16 November 2011	28 April 2013	Independent	Monti
Maurizio Lupi (1954– )		28 April 2013	20 March 2015	The People of Freedom/ New Centre-Right	Letta
Maurizio Lupi (1954– )		28 April 2013	20 March 2015	The People of Freedom/ New Centre-Right	Renzi
Graziano Delrio (1960– )		2 April 2015	1 June 2018	Democratic Party	Renzi; Gentiloni
Danilo Toninelli (1974– )		1 June 2018	Incumbent	Five Star Movement	Conte I
Paola De Micheli (1973– )		5 September 2019	13 February 2021	Democratic Party	Conte II
Enrico Giovannini (1957– )		13 February 2021	Incumbent	Independent	Draghi
