= Giovanni Spagnolli =

Italian politician (1907–1984)

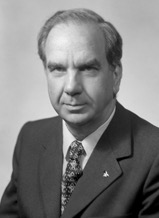

President of the Italian Senate
- In office 27 June 1973 – 4 July 1976
- Preceded by: Amintore Fanfani
- Succeeded by: Amintore Fanfani

Minister of Merchant Navy
- In office 5 December 1963 – 23 July 1964
- Prime Minister: Aldo Moro
- Preceded by: Francesco Maria Dominedò
- Succeeded by: Vittorino Colombo
- In office 25 June 1968 – 13 December 1968
- Prime Minister: Giovanni Leone
- Preceded by: Lorenzo Natali
- Succeeded by: Giuseppe Lupis

Minister of Telecommunications
- In office 23 February 1966 – 25 June 1968
- Prime Minister: Aldo Moro
- Preceded by: Carlo Russo
- Succeeded by: Angelo De Luca

Senator of the Republic
- In office 25 June 1953 – 4 July 1976
- Constituency: Trentino Alto Adige

Personal details
- Born: 26 October 1907 Rovereto, Italy
- Died: 5 October 1984 (aged 76) Rovereto, Italy
- Party: Christian Democracy
- Education: Università Cattolica del Sacro Cuore

Giovanni Spagnolli (26 October 1907 – 5 October 1984) was an Italian Christian Democrat politician.

== Biography ==
=== Early life and education ===
He was born on 26 October 1907 in Rovereto, a city in the Austro-Hungarian Tyrol at the time. He began his high school studies at the Imperial Regio Ginnasio in Rovereto. Refugee with his family (originally from Isera) in Dornbirn, in Vorarlberg during the Great War, he returned to his city after 1918, to complete his studies there until the end of high school.

At 19, he chose Milan for the university, convinced that this "leap from the province" could benefit his future: he earned two degrees, and Agostino Gemelli retained him as Administrative Deputy Secretary of the Catholic University of the Sacred Heart.

The Feltrinelli Legnami company, with many contacts in Trentino, called him in turn as administrator. During the years of the Resistance, he worked in Brianza and Milan to shake consciences and organize the ranks of the new party of the Christian Democrats, of which he became the Milanese secretary. He collaborated from Rome in the reconstruction of Italy through UNRRA-CAASAS plans to give new homes to millions of homeless.

=== Political career ===
From 1953 for 23 years he was a member of parliament in the Constituency of Rovereto. He was undersecretary of foreign trade from July 1958 to March 1960; Minister of the Merchant Marine from December 1963 to February 1966 and from June to December 1968. From February 1966 to June 1968 he was Minister of Post and Teleommunications.

From 1973 to 1976 he held the position of President of the Senate (the first Alpine in that position). He left his political life in 1976 to deal with the Italian Alpine Club, of which he was president from 1971 to 1980, and with the problems of international volunteering.

=== Death ===
He died of a stroke in 1984.
