= Giacinto Bosco =

Italian jurist and politician (1905–1997)

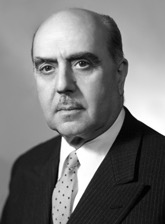
- Born: 25 January 1905; Caserta
- Died: 11 October 1997 (aged 92); Rome
- Education: University of Naples
- Occupation: Jurist
- Years active: 1927–1988
- Political party: Christian Democracy

Academic work
- Discipline: Law
- Sub-discipline: International law
- Institutions: University of Urbino; University of Florence; University of Rome

Giacinto Bosco (25 January 1905 – 11 October 1997) was an Italian jurist, academic and politician from the Christian Democrats. He held various ministerial posts from 1960 to 1972. After retiring from politics he served as a judge at the Court of Justice of the European Union between 1976 and 1988.

== Early life and education ==
Born on 25 January 1905 in Caserta Bosco obtained a PhD in law from the University of Naples in 1925.

== Career ==
Bosco worked as a deputy secretary at the Ministry of Foreign Affairs in the period 1927–1932. He became a professor of international law at the University of Rome and the dean of the Faculty of Law at the University of Urbino in 1932. He worked as a full professor of international law at the University of Florence (1933–1940) and at the University of Rome (1940–1975).

Bosco was a member of the Christian Democrats and was a close ally of Amintore Fanfani. In the 1960s they were part of the same faction within the party. Bosco served as a senator in the period 1948–1972 for the Christian Democrats. He was the state secretary at the Ministry of Defense (1953–1958), vice president of the Senate (1958–1960). From 1960 Bosco held several cabinet posts: minister of education (1960–1962); minister of justice (1962–1963); minister of labor and social security (1963–1964 and 1966–1968); minister without portfolio for United Nations affairs (1968–1969 and 1970); minister of finance (1969–1970) and minister of posts and telecommunications (1970–1972). He served as a judge at the Court of Justice of the European Union from 7 October 1976 to 6 October 1988.

== Death ==
Bosco died in Rome at the age of 92 on 11 October 1997.
