= Giacomo Mancini =

Italian politician (1916–2002)

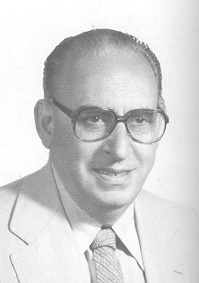

Member of the Chamber of Deputies
- In office 8 May 1948 – 22 April 1992
- Constituency: Catanzaro

Mayor of Cosenza
- In office 14 September 1985 – 15 July 1986
- Preceded by: Claudio Giuliani
- Succeeded by: Claudio Giuliani
- In office 6 December 1993 – 8 April 2002
- Preceded by: Luigi Serra
- Succeeded by: Eva Catizone

Minister of Health
- In office 4 December 1963 – 22 July 1964
- Prime Minister: Aldo Moro
- Preceded by: Angelo Raffaele Jervolino
- Succeeded by: Luigi Mariotti

Minister of Public Works
- In office 22 July 1964 – 4 June 1968
- Prime Minister: Aldo Moro
- Preceded by: Giovanni Pieraccini
- Succeeded by: Lorenzo Natali
- In office 12 December 1968 – 5 August 1969
- Prime Minister: Mariano Rumor
- Preceded by: Lorenzo Natali
- Succeeded by: Lorenzo Natali

Personal details
- Born: 21 April 1916 Cosenza, Italy
- Died: 8 April 2002 (aged 85) Cosenza, Italy
- Party: PSI (until 1994); PSE-Mancini List (1994–2002)
- Occupation: Lawyer, politician

Giacomo Mancini (21 April 1916 – 8 April 2002) was an Italian politician and lawyer.

He was the grandfather of the namesake politician Giacomo Mancini Jr.

== Biography ==
He was the son of Pietro Mancini, one of the founders of the Italian Socialist Party (PSI). In 1944, he became part of the anti-fascist clandestine military organization in Rome. After the liberation, he returned to Cosenza and became secretary, until 1947, of the local socialist federation and a member of the national party leadership until 1948. He served as municipal councillor of Cosenza from 1946 to 1952, while he entered the Chamber of Deputies in 1948, with 26,000 votes of preference, elected on the lists of the Popular Democratic Front: he remained there for ten legislatures, until 1992.

In January 1953, he was elected regional secretary of the PSI. In 1956, in the aftermath of the Soviet repression of the Hungarian revolution, the political ways of the PSI and the PCI separated, and Mancini was called by Pietro Nenni to take care of the organization of the party.

He was Minister of Health in the first Moro government and Minister of Public Works in the second and third Moro governments and in the first Rumor government. Later, he became Minister of Extraordinary Interventions in the South in the fifth Rumor government. As Minister of Health, he also imposed the introduction of the Sabin polio vaccine. As Minister of Public Works, he completed the construction of the Salerno-Reggio Calabria motorway.

On 9 June 1969, he became national deputy secretary of the PSI, and, on 23 April 1970, he became its secretary. He held office until 13 March 1971.

After having already been Mayor of Cosenza for a few months in 1985, he was re-elected in 1993 at the head of some civic lists unrelated to traditional parties. It the same year some repentants accused him of alleged relations with mafia gangs of Reggio Calabria and Cosenza. Mancini dismissed the accusations made against him, but the Court of Palmi, on 25 March 1996, sentenced him for external competition in a mafia association. A year later, the Court of Appeal of Reggio Calabria, on 24 June 1997, annulled the sentence for territorial incompetence, postponing all the documents to Catanzaro. A first conclusion of the court case came on 19 November 1999, with the acquittal by the judge for the preliminary hearing, Vincenzo Calderazzo, who declared the crime of criminal association extinguished by prescription, while for that of external competition in mafia association Mancini was acquitted because the fact didn't exist. The appeal process, set at the end of June 2000, was postponed to a new role and never began.

After the legal proceedings, Mancini resumed political and administrative activity, after a period of suspension from the office of mayor. He returned to lead the municipal administration of Cosenza and was re-elected mayor in the first round in 1997, also supported by The Olive Tree coalition. After the dissolution of the PSI, he founded the Mancini List, which aimed to bring the values of European socialism into Italian politics.
