= Roberto Tremelloni =

Italian academic and politician (1900–1987)

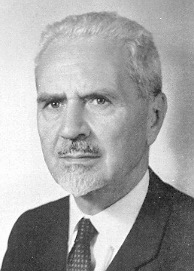

Personal details
- Born: 10 October 1900 Milan
- Died: 8 September 1987 (aged 86) Bruneck, South Tyrol
- Party: PRI (1910s); PSU (1922–1930); PSI (1930–1947); PSDI (from 1947)
- Children: 2
- Education: University of Turin

Roberto Tremelloni (30 October 1900 – 8 September 1987) was an Italian economist, academic, businessman and social democratic politician. He served in various cabinet posts.

== Early life ==
Tremelloni was born in Milan on 30 October 1900. He initially studied accounting at the Istituto Carlo Cattaneo in the city, before graduating with a degree in economics and commercial sciences at the University of Turin in 1924. Having long held ambitions to become a journalist, after serving with the Italian Army in the First World War he entered the editorial staff of the Milanese newspaper La Sera. In 1919 he formed the Aracne publishing house with his brother Attilio, and subsequently helped to establish an industrial co-operative that launched the first incarnation of the Milan Trade Fair.

Tremelloni's political activity began during the war, when he became involved with the youth wing of the Italian Republican Party (PRI). He then became a devoted supporter of the evolutionary socialist and anti-fascist Filippo Turati, following him into the ranks of the Unitary Socialist Party (PSU) when it was formed in 1922. The PSU, having broken away from the Italian Socialist Party (PSI), was absorbed back into it in 1930, and Tremelloni emerged as a prominent member of its reformist wing, alongside the likes of Turati, Claudio Treves, Carlo Rosselli and Giuseppe Saragat. It was with Rosselli and Pietro Nenni that he founded the socialist periodical Quarto Stato in 1926.

== Career ==
Having struggled to find an academic post due to his anti-fascist beliefs, in 1930 Tremelloni became a lecturer in political economy at the University of Geneva in Switzerland. He co-founded the financial newspaper 24 ore, modelled on the Financial Times, which was first published on 15 February 1933. In 1937, he carried out a study of the textile industry of Italy. Having escaped confinement for his anti-fascist activities, during the Second World War he maintained a low profile, retreating to the town of Cocquio-Trevisago in Varese to focus on his work with Aracne and to writing a history of contemporary Italian industry. At the end of the war, he was awarded the roles of commissioner at the Ministry of Industrial Production for Northern Italy and president of the Industrial Council of Northern Italy.

Tremelloni remained a senior figure in the PSI for many years and then, after its establishment in 1947, in the breakaway Italian Democratic Socialist Party (PSDI). In 1946, he was elected to the city council in Milan as a PSI member and, later that year, became a deputy in the Constituent Assembly. Between 1947 and 1948 he served as the minister of industry and commerce in the fourth cabinet of Prime Minister Alcide De Gasperi. He was appointed minister without portfolio, responsible for the implementation of the Marshall Plan, in De Gasperi's fifth cabinet in 1948. However, Tremelloni and two other social democratic cabinet members – Giuseppe Saragat, deputy prime minister and minister of merchant navy, and Ivan Matteo Lombardo, minister of industry and commerce – resigned from office on 31 October 1949.

Out of government, Tremelloni then became the president of the Istituto per le Relazioni Pubbliche, founded in Milan in 1952, and the following year he was appointed Professor of Economics and Business Organisation at the Polytechnic of Milan. It was during this period that he and Ezio Vigorelli led the parliament's inquiry committee on the problems of poverty and unemployment. In 1954 he returned to government when he was named as minister of finance in the coalition cabinet led by Mario Scelba, which was formed on 10 February. Tremelloni and Vigorelli were the two PSDI members of the cabinet.

In the 1960s, Tremelloni served as treasury minister on three occasions, from 21 February 1962 to 20 June 1963, from 4 December 1963 to 21 July 1964 and from 22 July 1964 to 22 February 1966. He was minister of defense from 23 February 1966 to 23 June 1968. He was also a board member of the European Investment Bank when serving as treasury minister. From 1963 to 1968 he was a member of the Italian Senate.

Tremelloni died of heart attack at a hospital in Bruneck, South Tyrol, on 8 September 1987.

Preceded by Giulio Andreotti	Minister of Defence of Italy; 1966–1968	Succeeded by Luigi Gui
