= Angelo Salizzoni =

Italian politician (1907–1992)

Angelos Salizzoni
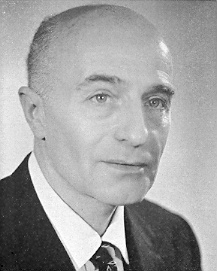

Member of Italian Chamber of Deputies
- In office 20 July 1979 – 1 July 1987
- Constituency: Bologna

Secretary of the Council of Ministers
- In office 8 December 1963 – 25 June 1968

Secretary of the Council of Ministers
- In office 27 November 1974 – 30 July 1976

Personal details
- Born: 15 October 1907 Bologna, Emilia-Romagna, Italy
- Died: 1 February 1992 (aged 84) Bologna, Emilia-Romagna, Italy
- Citizenship: Italy
- Party: Christian Democrats
- Profession: Insurer

Angelo Salizzoni (15 October 1907 – 1 February 1992) was an Italian politician, a member of Christian Democracy (Democrazia Cristiana, or DC) and deputy of the Constituent Assembly and the first six legislatures.

== Biography ==
Born in 1907 in Bologna to Giacomo and Venusta Stanzani, he worked as an accountant, with several insurance companies, and combined this professional activity with catholic political commitment.

Member of the Christian Democracy, he founded the christian democracy Bologna branch and served as its Vice-National Secretary. He was one of Aldo Moro's closest collaborators, who appointed him as secretary to the Prime Minister in his five governments.

Salizzoni died in Bologna on 1 February 1992.
