= Council of Ministers (Italy) =

Executive organ of the Italian government

Council of Ministers of Republic of Italy
- Italian: Consiglio dei Ministri

Overview
- Established: 23 March 1861; 165 years ago (Kingdom of Italy); 14 July 1946; 80 years ago (Italian Republic)
- State: Italy
- Leader: President of the Council
- Appointed by: President of the Republic
- Responsible to: Italian Parliament
- Headquarters: Chigi Palace
- Website: Official website

The Council of Ministers (Italian: Consiglio dei Ministri, CdM) is the principal executive organ of the Government of Italy. It comprises the President of the Council (the Prime Minister of Italy), all the ministers, and the Undersecretary to the Prime Minister. Deputy ministers (Italian: viceministri) and junior ministers (Italian: sottosegretari) are part of the government, but are not members of the Council of Ministers.

== History ==
The Council of Ministers' origins date to the production of the Albertine Statute by the Kingdom of Sardinia in 1848. The Statute, which subsequently became the Constitution of the Kingdom of Italy, did not envision collegial meetings of individual ministers, but simply the existence of ministers as heads of their ministries, responsible for their operations. The Council of Ministers subsequently developed as a constitutional convention and the office of the President of the Council emerged from the need to co-ordinate the activities of the individual ministers.

== Formation ==
=== Appointment ===
The Office of the Council of Ministers is regulated by the Constitution and consists of:

- The President of the Council of Ministers (usually referred to as Prime Minister), is the chair of the council and is appointed by the President of Italy after post-election consultations with the leaders of parliamentary groups, the Presidents of the Senate and Chamber of Deputies, and former Presidents of the Republic. The prime minister is confirmed by a motion of confidence (nominal voting) of both Houses of Parliament no later than 10 days following the swearing of Government as per the Constitution;
  - Should either House not pass the aforementioned motion, the Prime Minister has a constitutional duty to resign to allow the President either to find a new majority for the support of another appointed Prime Minister or to call for new elections;
- The Ministers, appointed by the President of Italy, but at the request of the Prime Minister;
  - As the per Constitution, the President has the power to question the choice of a minister, should there be grounds to call it into question. Until an agreement has been found, the head of the Ministry in question will not be appointed.

All powers of the Council of Ministers rest in the hands of the President of the Republic until the ministers assume their offices.

=== Oath ===
After the President of the Republic signs the appointment decrees, but before being able to exercise their functions, the Prime Minister and the Ministers must take an oath of office according to the formula laid out in Article 1.3 of Law n. 400/1988. The oath expresses the necessity of trust which is incumbent on all citizens, but especially on those holding public office (according to Article 54 of the Constitution).

=== Recall ===
According to Article 94 of the Constitution, the Government can have its confidence (or trust) revoked. The motion of no-confidence must be signed by at least one-tenth of the members of the House, and cannot be discussed for at least three days following the proposal. Once discussed, it must be voted through nominal appeal. While the recall of single ministers is not explicitly regulated, procedural practice allows for an individual motion of no-confidence: the first such case was Filippo Mancuso in 1995.

== Functions ==
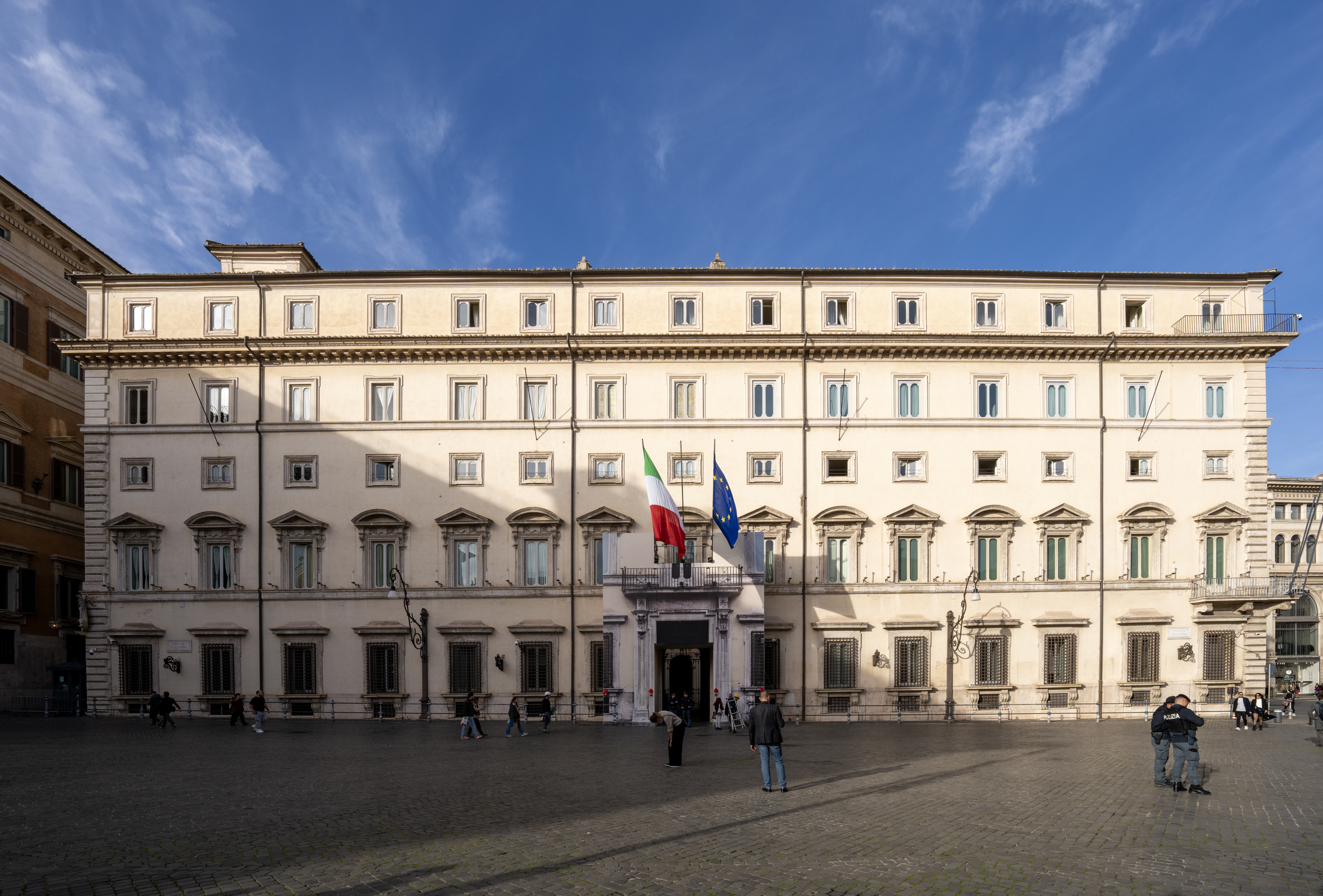
Chigi Palace in Rome, the seat of the Council of Ministers and the official residence of the Prime Minister of Italy

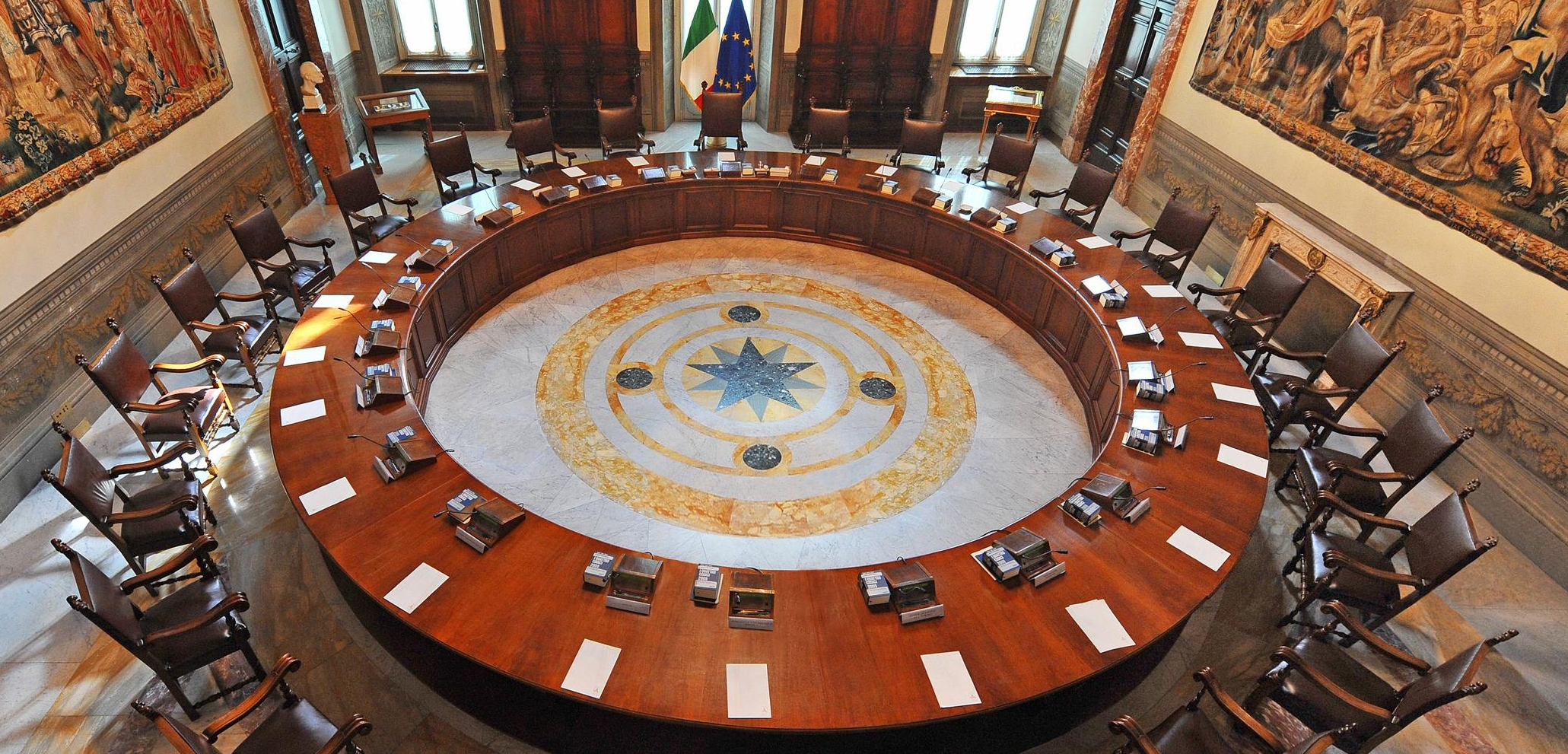
The meeting room of the Council of Ministers

The functions of the Council of Ministers are disciplined by the Constitution (article 92–96) and by Law n. 400 of 23 August 1988.

=== Relationship with other parts of the political system ===
The Council of Ministers within a Parliamentary form of Government (e.g., Italy) is the principal holder of executive power – that is, the power to put a decision of the Italian political process into effect (i.e., execute it).

- In relation to the Parliament, the "relationship of trust" (rapporto di fiducia) is crucial. For the Council of Ministers and the Prime Minister to exercise their functions fully and continue to stay in office, they must retain the political support of both Houses of Parliament. The relationship of trust is the core of parliamentary systems like the Italian one because it means that the Government is "responsible" to Parliament.
- The President of the Republic has the power to appoint the Prime Minister and the ministers.
- The regular judiciary is organised from an administrative-structural point of view by the Minister of Justice; however, the independence of the judiciary in relation to the other parts of the state remains firm, as is made clear by the existence of the High Council of the Judiciary which appoints, transfers, promotes, and disciplines members of the judiciary independently of the executive branch.

The members of the Council of Ministers, even if they leave their positions, are subject to the jurisdiction of the courts for activities committed in their official capacity only with the authorization of one of the chambers of the Parliament (art. 96 of the Constitution).

=== Powers ===
As the main organ of the executive power, the primary role of the Council of Ministers is the actualization of a given national policy. The Constitution provides it with the following means for doing this:

- Legislative initiative: The Council of Ministers can present bills to the two Houses of Parliament.
- Decree power: The Council of Ministers can adopt two different types of decree that have the force of law (that is, with a legal power equivalent to laws approved by Parliament): the law-decree (provisional) in matters of urgency and the legislative decree (non-provisional) in cases where Parliament has expressly delegated legislative authority to the council. Frequent use of the decree power has seen substantial legislative power shift from Parliament to the Council in recent times.
  - The law-decree (arts. 72 and 77 of the Constitution and art. 15 of Law n. 400/1988) is an act drafted by the Council of Ministers and passed by a majority of its members, but only in cases of the utmost need and urgency. Once passed, it enters into force immediately and is proposed to either House of Parliament for conversion into law. If the decree is not converted within 60 days, its effects become null and void.
  - The legislative decree (art. 76 of the Constitution) is a tool by means of which the Houses decide (e.g., due to inadequacy or lack of time) not to discipline in a detailed way a particular subject-matter (except in cases that must be disciplined by ordinary law), while at the same time they adopt the principles and criteria (i.e., the "frame") within which Government will have to legislate. This binds the Government to follow specific limits, and is a law in itself (s.c. "delegating law"), which is approved by Parliament just like an ordinary law. Once the established deadline is passed, the Government can no longer legislate. Furthermore, should the Government not abide by the delegating law, it will exceed the delegation, which, if presented to the Constitutional Court, the latter will decree the lack of constitutionality of the legislative decree in its part that exceeds the delegation. Just like the law-decree, the legislative decree is drafted by the council and passed by a majority of its members. It does not need conversion into law.
- Regulatory power: The ministers have two distinct but co-existing roles. They are, politically, the supreme executive authorities appointed by Parliament, but they are also the administrative heads of the State, the activities of which they direct in accordance with the political process. As administrators, the council and the individual ministers can produce "regulations" (regolamenti), which are legal implements subordinate to legislation. Thus, regulations which contradict legislation (i.e. laws passed by parliament, law-decrees, legislative decrees) are illegitimate and can be set aside by ordinary judges and annulled by administrative judges.

=== Tasks of the president of the council and of the ministers ===
- The president of the council directs the general policies of the government and is responsible for them. The president holds the unity of political and administrative direction by promoting and co-ordinating the activity of the ministers.
- The ministers are collectively responsible for the acts of the Council of Ministers and individually responsible for the acts pertaining to their ministries.

== List of current Italian ministers ==
The current Italian government is led by Giorgia Meloni. As of October 2022, the government has 25 ministers, of whom 9 are without portfolio.

Office	Portrait	Name	Term of office	Party
Prime Minister		Giorgia Meloni	22 October 2022 – present	Brothers of Italy
Deputy Prime Minister		Antonio Tajani	22 October 2022 – present	Forza Italia
Deputy Prime Minister		Matteo Salvini	22 October 2022 – present	League
Minister of Foreign Affairs and International Cooperation		Antonio Tajani	22 October 2022 – present	Forza Italia
Minister of the Interior		Matteo Piantedosi	22 October 2022 – present	Independent (close to League)
Minister of Justice		Carlo Nordio	22 October 2022 – present	Brothers of Italy
Minister of Defence		Guido Crosetto	22 October 2022 – present	Brothers of Italy
Minister of Economy and Finance		Giancarlo Giorgetti	22 October 2022 – present	League
Minister of Business and Made in Italy		Adolfo Urso	22 October 2022 – present	Brothers of Italy
Minister of Agriculture, Food Sovereignty and Forests		Francesco Lollobrigida	22 October 2022 – present	Brothers of Italy
Minister for the Environment and Energy Security		Gilberto Pichetto Fratin	22 October 2022 – present	Forza Italia
Minister of Infrastructure and Transport		Matteo Salvini	22 October 2022 – present	League
Minister of Labour and Social Policies		Marina Elvira Calderone	22 October 2022 – present	Independent
Minister of Education and Merit		Giuseppe Valditara	22 October 2022 – present	League
Minister of University and Research		Anna Maria Bernini	22 October 2022 – present	Forza Italia
Minister of Culture		Alessandro Giuli	6 September 2024 – present	Independent (close to FdI)
Minister of Health		Orazio Schillaci	22 October 2022 – present	Independent
Minister of Tourism		Gianmarco Mazzi	3 April 2026 – present	Brothers of Italy
Minister for Relations with Parliament (without portfolio)		Luca Ciriani	22 October 2022 – present	Brothers of Italy
Minister for Public Administration (without portfolio)		Paolo Zangrillo	22 October 2022 – present	Forza Italia
Minister for Regional Affairs and Autonomies (without portfolio)		Roberto Calderoli	22 October 2022 – present	League
Minister for Civil Protection and Maritime Policies (without portfolio)		Nello Musumeci	22 October 2022 – present	Brothers of Italy
Minister for European Affairs, Southern Italy, Cohesion Policy and the NRRP (without portfolio)		Tommaso Foti	2 December 2024 – present	Brothers of Italy
Minister for Sport and Youth (without portfolio)		Andrea Abodi	22 October 2022 – present	Independent
Minister for Family, Birth Rate and Equal Opportunities (without portfolio)		Eugenia Roccella	22 October 2022 – present	Brothers of Italy
Minister for Disabilities (without portfolio)		Alessandra Locatelli	22 October 2022 – present	League
Minister for Institutional Reforms and Regulatory Simplification (without portfolio)		Elisabetta Casellati	22 October 2022 – present	Forza Italia
Secretary of the Council of Ministers		Alfredo Mantovano	22 October 2022 – present	Independent

=== Possible current additional members ===
The Presidents of the Regions with Special Statute have the right to participate in sessions of the Council of Ministers in matters relevant to them are discussed (distinct from general issues common to all the regions). The Presidents of Sardinia, Friuli-Venezia Giulia, Aosta Valley, and Trentino-Alto Adige/Südtirol have only a consultative vote, while the President of Sicily has a full vote and the rank of a minister.

Presidents of the Regions with Special Statute
Member	Title
Renato Schifani	President of Sicily
Alessandra Todde	President of Sardinia
Renzo Testolin	President of the Aosta Valley
Massimiliano Fedriga	President of Friuli-Venezia Giulia
Arno Kompatscher	President of Trentino-Alto Adige/Südtirol
