= Ministry of Communications (Italy) =

The Ministry of Communications was set up in 1924 as a government ministry of the Kingdom of Italy, dealing with postal, telephone, telegraph and electronic communications, journalistic information and commercial advertising. Since the Berlusconi IV Cabinet of 2008 it has been incorporated into the Ministry of Economic Development.

== History ==
The first Ministry of Communications was established on 30 April 1924, replacing the Ministry of Posts and Telegraphs from the government of Mussolini. The first minister was Costanzo Ciano, founder of what was to become RAI (Radio-television Italia).

The ministry was divided into two distinct divisions on 12 December 1944, with a Ministry of Transport and a Ministry of Post and Telegraphs (later renamed the Ministry of Post and Telecommunications).

In 1992 Italy underwent a period of telecommunication reform in which the responsibility for running telecommunications passed from direct state control to private control (of state holdings). This resulted in the establishment of Telecom Italia S.p.A. in 1994, after the reorganisation of the ministry for the second time.

The period following resulted in large upheaval of the ministry, beginning in 1997 with the Autonomous Administration of Post and Telegraphs (an autonomous organ of the ministry) being incorporated into the Poste Italiane (the Italian Post Office) as well as simultaneously being made a public entity. In the same year, the ministry was renamed to its original title, Ministry of Communications. Two years later, the ministry was incorporated into the Ministry of Productive Activities. The actual incorporation was to take place in 2001, but was stopped by the government of Silvio Berlusconi.

The ministry reached its present-day configuration after the 2008 financial crisis, when the Prodi Government decided to revert to the Bassanini Reform of 1999. This was finally implemented by Berlusconi, incorporating the Ministry of Communications into the Ministry of Economic Development (present day equivalent of Ministry of Productive Activities).

== Organisation ==
The Ministry of Communications was organized as follows:

=== General Secretariat ===
- Directorate General for Human Resources Management
- Directorate General for Electronic Communication Services and Broadcasting
- Directorate General for Planning and Radio-electronic spectrum management
- Directorate General for Resource Management
- Directorate General for the Regulation of the Postal Sector
- Institute of Communications and Information Technology
- Territorial Inspectorates

=== Internal Organs ===
- Executive Committee for Broadband
- Council for Communications
- Commission for the Study and card processing postal stamps

== See also ==
- Ministry of Economic Development
- Italian Government
