= Tambroni government =

15th government of the Italian Republic

Tambroni Cabinet
- 15th Cabinet of Italy

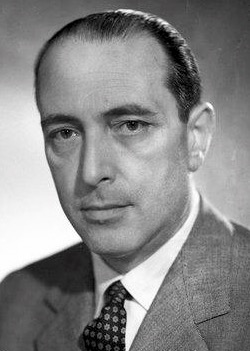
- Date formed: 26 March 1960
- Date dissolved: 27 July 1960

People and organisations
- Head of state: Giovanni Gronchi
- Head of government: Fernando Tambroni
- Total no. of members: 22
- Member party: DC; External support: MSI
- Status in legislature: One-party government
- Opposition parties: PCI, PSI, PSDI, PLI, PRI, PDIUM

History
- Legislature term: Legislature III (1958–1963)
- Predecessor: Segni II Cabinet
- Successor: Fanfani III Cabinet

The Tambroni Cabinet was the 15th cabinet of the Italian Republic led by the Fernando Tambroni of Christian Democracy (DC). It lasted from 25 March to 26 July 1960. The government received the necessary vote of confidence from the parliament thanks to the support of the neo-fascist Italian Social Movement (MSI), a unique case in the history of the Italian Republic. As a result, Tambroni's brief government was heavily criticized by the Italian left. His role as Prime Minister of Italy is best remembered for the short-lived riots that occurred in the summer of the same year due to his support for the MSI; as a consequence, Tambroni was eventually replaced by the fellow DC politician Amintore Fanfani as Prime Minister.

== History ==
Prime Minister Tambroni was a prominent advocate of law and order policies. He is mostly remembered for his resignation caused by the Genoa riots of 1960. Ferruccio Parri held an anti-fascist talk in during a demonstration on 19 July, two days after Tambroni's resignation. Its Minister of Culture Umberto Tupini attacked Federico Fellini's 1960 film La Dolce Vita, announcing that all the "shameful films" would soon be banned.

The 1960 Summer Olympics were to be held in Rome from 25 August. Italy had been admitted to the United Nations in December 1955 and international public opinion in 1960 was still aware of the shadow of the Fascist Italy past. Historian Gianpasquale Santomassimo said that if the games had been held under a government of neo-fascists, it would have been a catastrophic impact on Italy's image.

== Composition ==
| Office | Name | Party | Term |
|---|---|---|---|
| Prime Minister | Fernando Tambroni | DC | 26 March 1960–27 July 1960 |
| Deputy Prime Minister | Attilio Piccioni | DC | 26 March 1960–27 July 1960 |
| Minister of Foreign Affairs | Antonio Segni | DC | 26 March 1960–27 July 1960 |
| Minister of the Interior | Giuseppe Spataro | DC | 26 March 1960–27 July 1960 |
| Minister of Grace and Justice | Guido Gonella | DC | 26 March 1960–27 July 1960 |
| Minister of Budget | Fernando Tambroni (ad interim) | DC | 26 March 1960–27 July 1960 |
| Minister of Finance | Giuseppe Trabucchi | DC | 26 March 1960–27 July 1960 |
| Minister of Treasury | Paolo Emilio Taviani | DC | 26 March 1960–27 July 1960 |
| Minister of Defence | Giulio Andreotti | DC | 26 March 1960–27 July 1960 |
| Minister of Public Education | Giuseppe Medici | DC | 26 March 1960–27 July 1960 |
| Minister of Public Works | Giuseppe Togni | DC | 26 March 1960–27 July 1960 |
| Minister of Agriculture and Forests | Mariano Rumor | DC | 26 March 1960–27 July 1960 |
| Minister of Transport | Fiorentino Sullo | DC | 26 March 1960–11 April 1960 |
| Minister of Transport | Mario Ferrari Aggradi (ad interim) | DC | 11 April–27 July 1960 |
| Minister of Post and Telecommunications | Antonio Maxia | DC | 26 March 1960–27 July 1960 |
| Minister of Industry and Commerce | Emilio Colombo | DC | 26 March 1960–27 July 1960 |
| Minister of Health | Camillo Giardina | DC | 26 March 1960–27 July 1960 |
| Minister of Foreign Trade | Mario Martinelli | DC | 26 March 1960–27 July 1960 |
| Minister of Merchant Navy | Angelo Raffaele Jervolino | DC | 26 March 1960–27 July 1960 |
| Minister of State Holdings | Mario Ferrari Aggradi | DC | 26 March 1960–27 July 1960 |
| Minister of Labour and Social Security | Benigno Zaccagnini | DC | 26 March 1960–27 July 1960 |
| Minister of Tourism and Entertainment | Umberto Tupini | DC | 26 March 1960–27 July 1960 |
| Minister for the South and the Depressed Areas (without portfolio) | Giulio Pastore | DC | 26 March 1960–27 July 1960 |
| Minister for the South and the Depressed Areas (without portfolio) | Fernando Tambroni (ad interim) | DC | 26 March 1960–27 July 1960 |
| Minister for Parliamentary Relations (without portfolio) | Armando Angelini | DC | 26 March 1960–27 July 1960 |
| Minister for Public Administration Reform (without portfolio) | Giorgio Bo | DC | 26 March 1960–11 April 1960 |
| Secretary of the Council of Ministers | Alberto Folchi | DC | 26 March 1960–27 July 1960 |

== Sources ==
- Ginsborg, Paul (1990). A History of Contemporary Italy: Society and Politics, 1943-1988.
