= Fiorentino Sullo =

Italian politician (1921–2000)

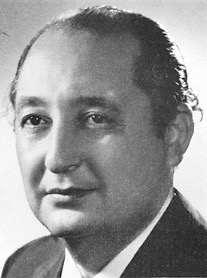

Minister for Regional Affairs
- In office 26 June 1972 – 8 July 1973
- Prime Minister: Giulio Andreotti
- Preceded by: Eugenio Gatto
- Succeeded by: Mario Toros

Minister of University and Research
- In office 17 February 1972 – 26 June 1972
- Prime Minister: Giulio Andreotti
- Preceded by: Camillo Ripamonti
- Succeeded by: Pier Luigi Romita

Minister of Public Education
- In office 12 December 1968 – 24 March 1969
- Prime Minister: Mariano Rumor
- Preceded by: Giovanni Battista Scaglia
- Succeeded by: Mario Ferrari Aggradi

Minister of Public Works
- In office 21 February 1962 – 4 December 1963
- Prime Minister: Amintore Fanfani; Giovanni Leone
- Preceded by: Benigno Zaccagnini
- Succeeded by: Giovanni Pieraccini

Minister of Transport
- In office 25 March 1960 – 11 April 1960
- Prime Minister: Fernando Tambroni
- Preceded by: Armando Angelini
- Succeeded by: Carlo Ferrari Aggradi
Parliamentary offices
Member of the Chamber of Deputies
In office 20 June 1979 – 1 July 1987
Constituency	Benevento
In office 8 May 1948 – 4 July 1976
Constituency	Benevento
Member of the Constituent Assembly
In office 25 June 1946 – 31 January 1948
Constituency	Salerno

Personal details
- Born: 29 March 1921 Paternopoli, Kingdom of Italy
- Died: 3 July 2000 (aged 79) Salerno, Italy
- Party: DC (until 1974; from 1982); PSDI (1974–1982)
- Spouse: Viretta De Laurentiis
- Children: 1
- Education: University of Naples

Fiorentino Sullo (29 March 1921 – 3 July 2000) was an Italian politician who was a member of the Christian Democracy. He held several cabinet posts, including minister public works.

== Early life and education ==
Sullo was born in Paternopoli on 29 March 1921. He graduated from the faculty of literature and philosophy at the University of Naples. Then he received a degree in law from the University of Naples in March 1949.

== Career and activities ==
Following his graduation Sullo worked as a history and philosophy teacher in high schools from 1944 to 1946. He became a member of Christian Democracy in April 1944. In 1946 he was elected to the Constituent Assembly from the Salerno-Avellino district. He represented the party at the Parliament for eight terms between 1948 and 1987 with a one-term interruption from1976 to 1979. Sullo was named as the national leader of a leftist faction (Italian: Sinistra di Base) in the party. He left the faction in 1964 and joined another one, the Dorotei (Dorotheans) faction.

Sullo served as state secretary in three successive cabinets between 1957 and 1960. He was appointed minister of transport on 25 March 1960 to the cabinet of Fernando Tambroni. Sullo resigned from the post on 11 April 1960. Next Sullo was named as the minister of labor and social security on 26 July 1960 to the cabinet led by Amintore Fanfani and served in the post until 20 February 1962. Sullo was the minister of public works between 21 February 1962 and 20 June 1963 in the next cabinet led by Amintore Fanfani. From June to December 1963 he continued to serve in the same post in the subsequent cabinet headed by Giovanni Leone. In April 1968 he was again nominated as minister of public works, but he was not confirmed by the Parliament. Therefore, his reformation plan which had been initiated by him in 1962 ended.

In December 1968 Sullo was appointed minister of education in the cabinet of Mariano Rumor. Sullo resigned from office in February 1969. From February 1972 to July 1973 he served in the first and second cabinets of Giulio Andreotti as state minister without portfolio. In March 1974 Sullo resigned from the Christian Democracy and joined the Italian Social Democratic Party in June that year. However, he was elected to the Parliament in 1983 on the list of the Christian Democracy where he served until 1987.

== Personal life and death ==
In 1961 Sullo married Viretta De Laurentiis with whom he would have a daughter, Marcella. Following his retirement from politics they settled in Torella dei Lombardi in the province of Avellino. He died of complications resulted from diabetes in Salerno on 3 July 2000.

=== Legacy ===
Following his death a foundation was established with his name, Fiorentino Sullo Foundation.

== Electoral history ==
Election	House	Constituency	Party	Votes	Result
1946	Constituent Assembly	Salerno–Avellino	DC	15,532	Elected
1948	Chamber of Deputies	Benevento–Avellino–Salerno	DC	49,448	Elected
1953	Chamber of Deputies	Benevento–Avellino–Salerno	DC	58,199	Elected
1958	Chamber of Deputies	Benevento–Avellino–Salerno	DC	90,870	Elected
1963	Chamber of Deputies	Benevento–Avellino–Salerno	DC	123,542	Elected
1968	Chamber of Deputies	Benevento–Avellino–Salerno	DC	142,499	Elected
1972	Chamber of Deputies	Benevento–Avellino–Salerno	DC	116,513	Elected
1979	Chamber of Deputies	Benevento–Avellino–Salerno	PSDI	14,800	Elected
1983	Chamber of Deputies	Benevento–Avellino–Salerno	DC	66,805	Elected
