= Second Segni government =

14th government of the Italian Republic

Segni II Cabinet
- 14th Cabinet of Italy

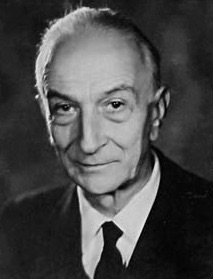
- Date formed: 16 February 1959
- Date dissolved: 26 March 1960

People and organisations
- Head of state: Giovanni Gronchi
- Head of government: Antonio Segni
- Total no. of members: 22
- Member party: DC; External support: MSI, PLI, PNM, PMP
- Status in legislature: One-party government
- Opposition parties: PCI, PSI, PSDI, PRI

History
- Legislature term: Legislature III (1958–1963)
- Predecessor: Fanfani II Cabinet
- Successor: Tambroni Cabinet

The Segni II Cabinet was the 14th cabinet of the Italian Republic, which held office from 16 February 1959 to 26 March 1960, for a total of 404 days (or 1 year, 1 month and 10 days).

== Composition ==
Office	Name	Party	Term
Prime Minister	Antonio Segni	DC	16 February 1959–26 March 1960
Minister of Foreign Affairs	Giuseppe Pella	DC	16 February 1959–26 March 1960
Minister of the Interior	Antonio Segni (ad interim)	DC	16 February 1959–26 March 1960
Minister of Grace and Justice	Guido Gonella	DC	16 February 1959–26 March 1960
Minister of Budget	Fernando Tambroni	DC	16 February 1959–26 March 1960
Minister of Finance	Paolo Emilio Taviani	DC	16 February 1959–26 March 1960
Minister of Treasury	Fernando Tambroni (ad interim)	DC	16 February 1959–26 March 1960
Minister of Defence	Giulio Andreotti	DC	16 February 1959–26 March 1960
Minister of Public Education	Giuseppe Medici	DC	16 February 1959–26 March 1960
Minister of Public Works	Giuseppe Togni	DC	16 February 1959–26 March 1960
Minister of Agriculture and Forests	Mariano Rumor	DC	16 February 1959–26 March 1960
Minister of Transport	Armando Angelini	DC	16 February 1959–26 March 1960
Minister of Post and Telecommunications	Giuseppe Spataro	DC	16 February 1959–26 March 1960
Minister of Industry and Commerce	Emilio Colombo	DC	16 February 1959–26 March 1960
Minister of Health	Camillo Giardina	DC	16 February 1959–26 March 1960
Minister of Foreign Trade	Rinaldo Del Bo	DC	16 February 1959–26 March 1960
Minister of Merchant Navy	Angelo Raffaele Jervolino	DC	16 February 1959–26 March 1960
Minister of State Holdings	Mario Ferrari Aggradi	DC	16 February 1959–26 March 1960
Minister of Labour and Social Security	Benigno Zaccagnini	DC	16 February 1959–26 March 1960
Minister of Tourism and Entertainment (Note: Until 31 July 1959: Minister without portfolio)	Umberto Tupini	DC	16 February 1959–26 March 1960
Minister for the South and the Depressed Areas (without portfolio)	Giulio Pastore	DC	16 February 1959–26 March 1960
Minister for Parliamentary Relations (without portfolio)	Giuseppe Bettiol	DC	16 February 1959–26 March 1960
Minister for Public Administration Reform (without portfolio)	Giorgio Bo	DC	16 February 1959–26 March 1960
Secretary of the Council of Ministers	Carlo Russo	DC	16 February 1959–26 March 1960
