= Second Fanfani government =

13th government of the Italian Republic

Fanfani II Cabinet
- 13th Cabinet of Italy

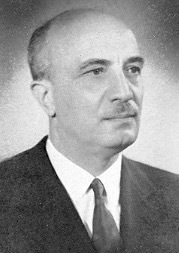
- Date formed: 2 July 1958
- Date dissolved: 16 February 1959

People and organisations
- Head of state: Giovanni Gronchi
- Head of government: Amintore Fanfani
- Total no. of members: 21
- Member parties: DC, PSDI
- Status in legislature: Coalition government

History
- Election: 1958 election
- Legislature term: Legislature III (1958–1963)
- Predecessor: Zoli Cabinet
- Successor: Segni II Cabinet

The Fanfani II Cabinet was the 13th cabinet of the Italian Republic, that held office from 2 July 1958 to 16 February 1959, for a total of 229 days, or 7 months and 14 days.

The government obtained the confidence in the Senate on 12 July 1958, with 128 votes in favor, 111 against and 2 abstentions, and in the Chamber of Deputies on 19 July, with 295 votes in favor, 287 against and 9 abstentions.

== Party breakdown ==
- Christian Democracy (DC): Prime minister, 16 ministers, 29 undersecretaries
- Italian Democratic Socialist Party (PSDI): 4 ministers, 5 undersecretaries

== Composition ==
Office	Name	Party	Term
Prime Minister	Amintore Fanfani	DC	2 July 1958–16 February 1959
Deputy Prime Minister	Antonio Segni	DC	2 July 1958–16 February 1959
Minister of Foreign Affairs	Antonio Segni (ad interim)	DC	2 July 1958–16 February 1959
Minister of the Interior	Fernando Tambroni	DC	2 July 1958–16 February 1959
Minister of Grace and Justice	Guido Gonella	DC	2 July 1958–16 February 1959
Minister of Budget	Giuseppe Medici	DC	2 July 1958–16 February 1959
Minister of Finance	Luigi Preti	PSDI	2 July 1958–16 February 1959
Minister of Treasury	Giulio Andreotti	DC	2 July 1958–16 February 1959
Minister of Defence	Antonio Segni	DC	2 July 1958–16 February 1959
Minister of Public Education	Aldo Moro	DC	2 July 1958–16 February 1959
Minister of Public Works	Giuseppe Togni	DC	2 July 1958–16 February 1959
Minister of Agriculture and Forests	Mario Ferrari Aggradi	DC	2 July 1958–16 February 1959
Minister of Transport	Armando Angelini	DC	2 July 1958–16 February 1959
Minister of Post and Telecommunications	Alberto Simonini	PSDI	2 July 1958–16 February 1959
Minister of Industry and Commerce	Giorgio Bo	DC	2 July 1958–16 February 1959
Minister of Health	Vincenzo Monaldi	DC	2 July 1958–16 February 1959
Minister of Foreign Trade	Emilio Colombo	DC	2 July 1958–16 February 1959
Minister of Merchant Navy	Giuseppe Spataro	DC	2 July 1958–16 February 1959
Minister of State Holdings	Edgardo Lami Starnuti	PSDI	2 July 1958–16 February 1959
Minister of Labour and Social Security	Ezio Vigorelli	PSDI	2 July 1958–16 February 1959
Minister for the Fund for the South (without portfolio)	Giulio Pastore	DC	2 July 1958–16 February 1959
Minister for Parliamentary Relations (without portfolio)	Rinaldo Del Bo	DC	2 July 1958–16 February 1959
Minister for Public Administration Reform (without portfolio)	Camillo Giardina	DC	2 July 1958–16 February 1959
Secretary of the Council of Ministers	Antonio Maxia	DC	2 July 1958–16 February 1959
