= Zoli government =

12th government of the Italian Republic

Zoli Cabinet
- 12th Cabinet of Italy

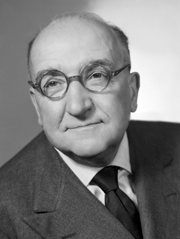
- Date formed: 20 May 1957
- Date dissolved: 2 July 1958

People and organisations
- Head of state: Giovanni Gronchi
- Head of government: Adone Zoli
- Total no. of members: 20
- Member parties: DC; External support: MSI, PSDI, PLI, PMP, PNM, PRI
- Status in legislature: One-party government
- Opposition parties: PCI, PSI

History
- Outgoing election: 1958 election
- Legislature term: Legislature II (1953–1958)
- Predecessor: Segni I Cabinet
- Successor: Fanfani II Cabinet

The Zoli Cabinet was the 12th cabinet of the Italian Republic, which held office from 20 May 1957 to 2 July 1958, for a total of 408 days, or 1 year, 1 months and 12 days.

The government obtained the confidence in the Senate on 4 June 1957, with 132 votes in favor and 93 against, and in the Chamber of Deputies on 7 June, with 305 votes in favor, 255 against and 11 abstentions.

This cabinet was the first one who has been supported by the neo-fascist Italian Social Movement; but Zoli, a strong anti-fascist, resigned the post of Prime Minister soon after it became clear that he would have needed to rely on the votes of the neo-fascists to form a majority in the Parliament. He was then convinced by President of the Republic, Giovanni Gronchi, to remain in the post until the natural dissolution of the Italian Parliament in 1958.

== Composition ==
Office	Name	Party	Term
Prime Minister	Adone Zoli	DC	20 May 1957–2 July 1958
Deputy Prime Minister	Giuseppe Pella	DC	20 May 1957–2 July 1958
Minister of Foreign Affairs	Giuseppe Pella	DC	20 May 1957–2 July 1958
Minister of the Interior	Fernando Tambroni	DC	20 May 1957–2 July 1958
Minister of Grace and Justice	Guido Gonella	DC	20 May 1957–2 July 1958
Minister of Budget	Adone Zoli (ad interim)	DC	20 May 1957–2 July 1958
Minister of Finance	Giulio Andreotti	DC	20 May 1957–2 July 1958
Minister of Treasury	Giuseppe Medici	DC	20 May 1957–2 July 1958
Minister of Defence	Paolo Emilio Taviani	DC	20 May 1957–2 July 1958
Minister of Public Education	Aldo Moro	DC	20 May 1957–2 July 1958
Minister of Public Works	Giuseppe Togni	DC	20 May 1957–2 July 1958
Minister of Agriculture and Forests	Emilio Colombo	DC	20 May 1957–2 July 1958
Minister of Transport	Armando Angelini	DC	20 May 1957–2 July 1958
Minister of Post and Telecommunications	Bernardo Mattarella	DC	20 May 1957–2 July 1958
Minister of Industry and Commerce	Silvio Gava	DC	20 May 1957–2 July 1958
Minister of Foreign Trade	Guido Carli	DC	20 May 1957–2 July 1958
Minister of Merchant Navy	Gennaro Cassiani	DC	20 May 1957–2 July 1958
Minister of State Holdings	Giorgio Bo	DC	20 May 1957–2 July 1958
Minister of Labour and Social Security	Luigi Gui	DC	20 May 1957–17 June 1958
Minister of Labour and Social Security	Adone Zoli (ad interim)	DC	17 June 1958–2 July 1958
Minister for the Fund for the South (without portfolio)	Pietro Campilli	DC	20 May 1957–26 February 1958
Minister for Parliamentary Relations (without portfolio)	Rinaldo Del Bo	DC	20 May 1957–2 July 1958
Minister for Public Administration Reform (without portfolio)	Mario Zotta	DC	20 May 1957–2 July 1958
Secretary of the Council of Ministers	Lorenzo Spallino	DC	20 May 1957–2 July 1958
