= Centrism (Italy) =

Italian party system (1947–1962)

Centrism Centrismo
- Leaders: Alcide De Gasperi; Luigi Einaudi; Mario Scelba; Antonio Segni
- Founded: 1947
- Dissolved: 1962
- Succeeded by: Organic centre-left
- Ideology: Christian democracy Liberalism
- Political position: Centre

Centrism (Italian: centrismo) was a political formula that inspired the Atlanticist, anti-communist, and centrist governments of the Italian Republic between the late 1940s and the early 1960s. The governments of this period were characterized by a coalition pact between the Christian Democracy (DC) and the other minor secular and regionalist parties.

Also known as "The Years of Centrism" (Italian: gli anni del centrismo), the DC-led party system and coalition governments formally ended in 1962 when the fourth Fanfani government obtained a motion of confidence with the abstention of the Italian Socialist Party (PSI), sparking the organic centre-left coalition. By 1963, the first Moro government saw the full participation of the PSI and a move to the left.

== Background ==
The centrist coalition had its origins in the late 1940s, or around 1947, representing the first party system of history of the Italian Republic and of the First Italian Republic following the National Liberation Committee (CLN) governments during the Italian Resistance and the Constituent Assembly period. It presided over four full governments (plus one that did not obtain a vote of confidence) led by Alcide De Gasperi, who was prime minister of Italy from 1946 to 1953, more than any other past and present democratically-elected prime minister. The May 1947 crises that saw the exclusion of communists from the government of France and Italy on the orders of the United States as the post-war period entered Italy and its government in the Cold War era.

== History ==
=== 1948 general election ===
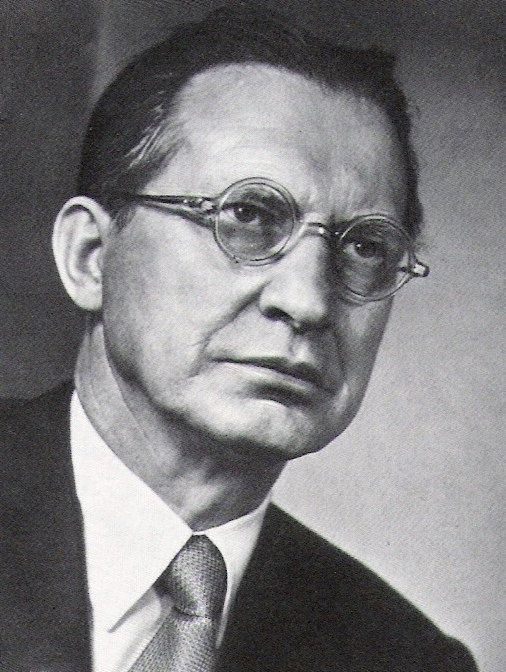
Alcide De Gasperi, prime minister of Italy (1946–1953)

The 1948 Italian general election, which was held on 18 April, was heavily influenced by the Cold War confrontation between the United States and the Soviet Union, with the United States engaging in heavy funding, propaganda, and covert operations, a practice that continued in the subsequent decades. After the Soviet-inspired February 1948 Communist coup in Czechoslovakia, the United States became alarmed about Soviet intentions and feared that if the leftist coalition were to win the elections, the Soviet-funded Italian Communist Party (PCI) would draw Italy into the Soviet Union's sphere of influence. In a context of fears of a new civil war after the Italian Civil War (1943–1945), the DC ran a fearmongering political campaign, assuring voters that disaster would strike Italy if the left were to take power. Among its political slogans were that in Communist countries "children send parents to jail", "children are owned by the state", and that "people eat their own children", the latter a claim often made in particular by the centre-right coalition under Silvio Berlusconi. Another popular slogan was "In the secrecy of the polling booth, God sees you – Stalin doesn't".

Moreover, the United States and George Marshall informed the Italian government that anti-communism was a pre-condition for receiving American aid, and James Clement Dunn had directly asked De Gasperi to dissolve the Italian Parliament and remove the PCI. The threats of the United States in relation to the Marshall Plan and other foreign aid, which was further corroborated by Luigi Einaudi, who wrote in his diary of a dinner at the home of Pietro Quaroni, the Italian Ambassador to the Soviet Union, that it was agreed the United States would not grant real aid with the PCI still in government, were referenced in a speech by the PCI leader Palmiro Togliatti, who described the April 1948 election as not having been free and fair. He and other PCI leaders were instrumental in avoiding an armed insurrection and civil war in the aftermath of Togliatti's assassination attempt in July 1948.

In an election heavily influenced by the United States and the Vatican, and to a lesser degree by the Soviet Union, and even by the Irish government, the DC won a resounding victory with 48.5% of the vote (their best result ever) and large majorities in both the Chamber of Deputies and Senate. The Popular Democratic Front (FPD), which was composed of the PSI and the PCI, was not able to reach or improve the results that the two parties had achieved in the 1946 Italian general election. Despite the loss, the FPD was significant in that the election result established the PCI as the de facto largest and main left-wing party, sparking an hegemony on the left over the PSI. Although De Gasperi could have formed a single-party government, he instead formed a centrist coalition with the Italian Liberal Party (PLI), the Italian Republican Party (PRI), and the Italian Democratic Socialist Party (PSDI). De Gasperi formed three governments, the second one in 1950 after the defection of the PLI, which hoped for more right-wing policies, and the third one in 1951 after the defection of the PSDI, which hoped for more leftist policies. He ruled for five more years, helming four additional coalitions. According to The New York Times foreign news correspondent Anne O'Hare McCormick, "De Gasperi's policy is patience. He seems to be feeling his way among the explosive problems he has to deal with, but perhaps this wary mine-detecting method is the stabilizing force that holds the country in balance."

=== Scam Law and opening to the centre-left ===
The 1953 Italian general election was characterised by changes in the electoral law. Even if the general structure remained uncorrupted, the government introduced a majority bonus system of two thirds of seats in the Chamber for the coalition which would obtain at-large the absolute majority of votes. The change was strongly opposed by the opposition parties, as well as the DC's smaller coalition partners, who had no realistic chance of success under this system. The new law was called the "Scam Law" (Italian: legge truffa) by its critics, and its parliamentarian exam also had a disruptive effect, as some dissidents of minor government parties founded special opposition groups to deny the DC an artificial landslide victory. The campaign of the opposition to the Scam Law achieved its goal. The centrist coalition, which was composed of the DC, the PSDI, the PLI, the PRI, the South Tyrolean People's Party (SVP), and the Sardinian Action Party (PSd'Az), won 49.9% of national vote, resulting in an ordinary proportional distribution of the seats. Minor dissident parties resulted determinant for the final result, especially the short-lived National Democratic Alliance. As the leading and de facto ruling party, the DC did not repeat the result of 1948 that had been obtained under special conditions linked to the Cold War, and lost significant votes to the right, including resurgent neo-fascist politicians, particularly in Southern Italy. Technically, the government won the election, winning a majority of seats in both houses of Parliament; however, the frustration with the lack of a supermajority caused significant tensions in the leading coalition. De Gasperi was forced to resign by the Italian Parliament on 2 August and subsequently retired, and died twelve months later.

The legislature continued with weak governments, with minor parties refusing institutional responsibilities. Giuseppe Pella rose to power but fell after only five months, following heated disputes about the status of the Free Territory of Trieste, which Pella was claiming. Amintore Fanfani's succeeding first ministry failed to receive a vote of confidence in Parliament, whilst Mario Scelba and Antonio Segni followed with more traditional centrist coalitions supported by the PSDI and the PLI. Under the administration of Scelba, the problem of Trieste was settled by ceding Koper to Yugoslavia. The parliamentary term was seen out by the minority government chaired by Adone Zoli, finishing a legislature that significantly weakened the office of the Prime Minister, held by six different leaders. The 1958 Italian general election confirmed the centrist coalition, with government formed by the DC and the PSI under Amintore Fanfani. This marked the de facto end of the centrist coalition as the second Fanfani government was followed by three single-party government led by the DC, including the short but controversial Tambroni government, which saw the support of the neo-fascist Italian Social Movement (MSI). Fanfani returned to power following the resignation of Tambroni, presiding over a longer government that lasted until 1962. The fourth Fanfani government established in February 1962 saw the abstention of the PSI and is generally considered the end of the centrist coalition and the beginning of the more social-democratic influenced and oriented organic centre-left, which formally started in December 1963 as the PSI joined three consecutive governments led by Aldo Moro between 1963 and 1968.

== Political parties ==
Party	Main ideology	Leader
Christian Democracy	Christian democracy	Alcide De Gasperi
Italian Democratic Socialist Party	Social democracy	Giuseppe Saragat
Italian Liberal Party	Liberalism	Luigi Einaudi
Italian Republican Party	Social liberalism	Randolfo Pacciardi
South Tyrolean People's Party	Regionalism	Karl Erckert
Sardinian Action Party	Regionalism	Emilio Lussu

== Electoral results ==
=== Chamber of Deputies ===
Election	Votes	%	Seats	+/−	Prime Minister
1948	16,439,931 (1st)	62.6	370 / 574	–	Alcide De Gasperi
1953	13,488,813 (1st)	49.8	303 / 590	▼67	Alcide De Gasperi

=== Senate of the Republic ===
Election	Votes	%	Seats	+/−	Prime Minister
1948	14,427,297 (1st)	63.7	156 / 237	–	Alcide De Gasperi
1953	11,771,179 (1st)	48.5	121 / 237	▼35	Alcide De Gasperi
