= Third Fanfani government =

16th government of the Italian Republic

Fanfani III Cabinet
- 16th Cabinet of Italy

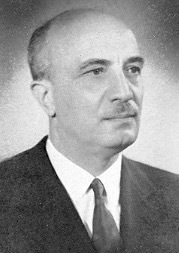
- Date formed: 27 July 1960
- Date dissolved: 22 February 1962

People and organisations
- Head of state: Giovanni Gronchi
- Head of government: Amintore Fanfani
- Total no. of members: 22
- Member party: DC; External support: PSDI, PLI, PRI; Abstention: PSI, PDIUM
- Status in legislature: One-party government
- Opposition parties: PCI, MSI

History
- Legislature term: Legislature III (1958–1963)
- Predecessor: Tambroni Cabinet
- Successor: Fanfani IV Cabinet

The Fanfani III Cabinet was the 16th cabinet of the Italian Republic, which held office from 27 July 1960 to 22 February 1962, for a total of 575 days, or 1 year, 6 months and 26 days.

The government obtained the confidence in the Senate on 3 August 1960, with 126 votes in favor, 58 against and 36 abstentions, and in the Chamber of Deputies on 5 August 1960, with 310 votes in favor, 156 against and 96 abstentions.

It was also known as Government of parallel convergences (Governo delle convergenze parallele).

== Composition ==
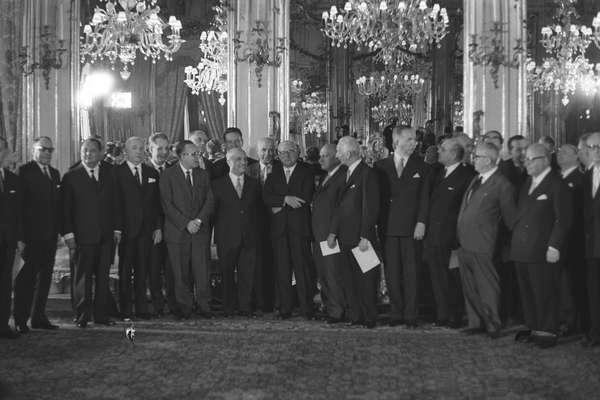
Official photo of the Craxi's government after the oath at the Quirinal Palace

Office	Name	Party	Term
Prime Minister	Amintore Fanfani	DC	27 July 1960–22 February 1962
Deputy Prime Minister	Attilio Piccioni	DC	27 July 1960–22 February 1962
Minister of Foreign Affairs	Antonio Segni	DC	27 July 1960–22 February 1962
Minister of the Interior	Mario Scelba	DC	27 July 1960–22 February 1962
Minister of Grace and Justice	Guido Gonella	DC	27 July 1960–22 February 1962
Minister of Budget	Giuseppe Pella	DC	27 July 1960–22 February 1962
Minister of Finance	Giuseppe Trabucchi	DC	27 July 1960–22 February 1962
Minister of Treasury	Paolo Emilio Taviani	DC	27 July 1960–22 February 1962
Minister of Defence	Giulio Andreotti	DC	27 July 1960–22 February 1962
Minister of Public Education	Giacinto Bosco	DC	27 July 1960–22 February 1962
Minister of Public Works	Benigno Zaccagnini	DC	27 July 1960–22 February 1962
Minister of Agriculture and Forests	Mariano Rumor	DC	27 July 1960–22 February 1962
Minister of Transport	Giuseppe Spataro	DC	27 July 1960–22 February 1962
Minister of Post and Telecommunications	Lorenzo Spallino	DC	27 July 1960–22 February 1962
Minister of Industry and Commerce	Emilio Colombo	DC	27 July 1960–22 February 1962
Minister of Health	Camillo Giardina	DC	27 July 1960–22 February 1962
Minister of Foreign Trade	Mario Martinelli	DC	27 July 1960–22 February 1962
Minister of Merchant Navy	Angelo Raffaele Jervolino	DC	27 July 1960–22 February 1962
Minister of State Holdings	Giorgio Bo	DC	27 July 1960–22 February 1962
Minister of Labour and Social Security	Fiorentino Sullo	DC	27 July 1960–22 February 1962
Minister of Tourism and Entertainment	Alberto Folchi	DC	27 July 1960–22 February 1962
Minister for the South and the Depressed Areas (without portfolio)	Giulio Pastore	DC	27 July 1960–22 February 1962
Minister for Parliamentary Relations (without portfolio)	Giuseppe Codacci Pisanelli	DC	27 July 1960–22 February 1962
Minister for Public Administration Reform (without portfolio)	Tiziano Tessitori	DC	27 July 1960–22 February 1962
Secretary of the Council of Ministers	Umberto Delle Fave	DC	27 July 1960–22 February 1962
