= Spataro =

Spataro is a surname. Notable people with the surname include:

- Emiliano Spataro (born 1976), Argentine racing driver
- Giovanni Spataro (1458–1541), Italian music theorist, composer, and choirmaster
- Giuseppe Spataro (1897–1979), Italian political figure
