= Armando Angelini =

Italian lawyer and politician (1891–1968)

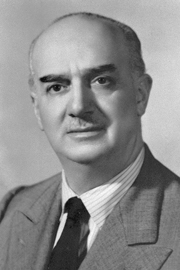
- Angelini while serving in the Senate

Personal details
- Born: 31 December 1891 Seravezza, Kingdom of Italy
- Died: 17 April 1968 (aged 76) Rome, Italy
- Party: Italian People's Party; Christian Democracy
- Education: University of Pisa
- Occupation: Lawyer

Armando Angelini (1891–1968) was an Italian lawyer and politician from the Christian Democracy. He served as the minister of transport and minister without portfolio in the late 1950s and in the early 1960s in various Italian cabinets. He was a member of the Parliament and the Senate.

== Early life and education ==
Angelini was born in Seravezza on 31 December 1891. He obtained a degree in law from the University of Pisa.

== Career ==
Following his graduation Angelini worked as a lawyer. He became a provincial councillor and was elected as a deputy for the Italian People's Party in 1919 which he held until 1924.

Following the end of the Fascist rule Angelini became a member of the Constituent Assembly in 1946. Then he served for two terms in the Parliament and for two terms in the Senate. His first term at the Parliament was between 1 June 1948 and 24 June 1953, and he was elected for the Christian Democracy from Pisa.

Angelini became a deputy for the party from Pisa again in 1954 and was in office until June 1958. He headed the Merchant Marine Commission in the Parliament in 1954. Angelini was the minister of transport between 1955 and 1958. He was appointed to the post 6 July 1955 to the first cabinet of Prime Minister Antonio Segni, and his term ended on 19 May 1957. Angelini was again named as the minister of transport on 20 May 1957 and held the post until 1 July 1958 in the cabinet of Prime Minister Adone Zoli.

Angelini became a member of the Senate on 12 June 1958 and served until 15 May 1963. He also held various cabinet posts during this period. He was the minister of transport from 1 July 1958 to 14 February 1959 in the second cabinet of Amintore Fanfani. He held the same post in the second cabinet of Antonio Segni between 15 February 1959 and 24 March 1960. Angelini was named as the minister without portfolio for relations with Parliament on 25 March 1960 to the cabinet of Fernando Tambroni and remained in office until 25 July 1960. Angelini was appointed minister without portfolio for public administration reform on 12 April 1960 to the cabinet of Tambroni, and his term ended on 25 July 1960.

Angelini was again a member of the senate between 16 May 1963 and 17 April 1968.

== Later years and death ==
Angelini died in a clinic in Rome on 17 April 1968 while he was a member of the Italian Senate.
