= Minister of Health (Italy) =

Ministry in the Cabinet of Italy

- Ministro della Salute

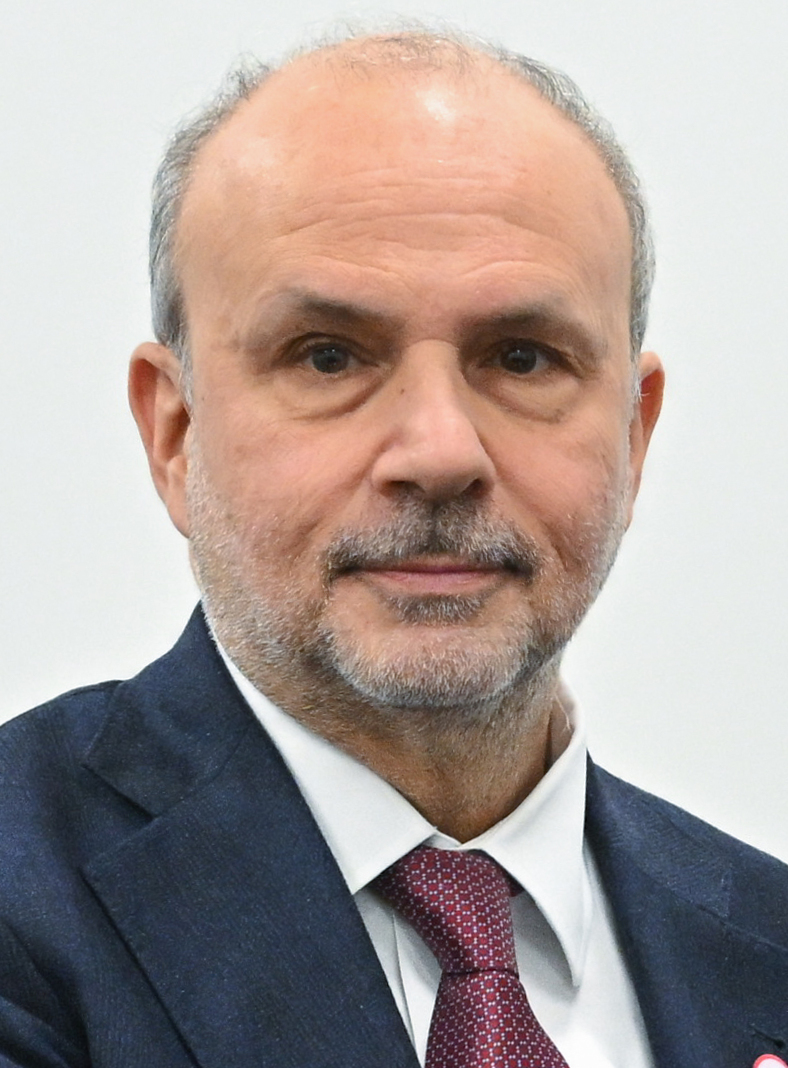
- Incumbent; Orazio Schillaci since 22 October 2022
- Ministry of Health
- Member of: Council of Ministers
- Reports to: The prime minister
- Seat: Rome
- Appointer: The president
- Term length: No fixed term
- Formation: 14 August 1958; 68 years ago
- First holder: Vincenzo Monaldi
- Website: www.salute.gov.it

The minister of health (Italian: ministro della salute) in Italy is one of the positions in the Italian government. The ministry was officially established in 1958, with Vincenzo Monaldi, of the Christian Democracy, serving as the first minister. From 1946 to 1958, the position was held by a high commissioners for hygiene and public health, who was not a minister but a special commissioner. Nicola Perrotti, of the Italian Socialist Party, served as the first high commissioner.

The current head of the Ministry of Health is professor Orazio Schillaci, appointed on 22 October 2022 by Prime Minister Giorgia Meloni.

== List of Italian ministers of health ==
Parties

- 1958–1994:
  - Christian Democracy
  - Italian Socialist Party
  - Italian Liberal Party
- 1994–present:
  - Italian People's Party
  - Forza Italia / The People of Freedom
  - National Alliance
  - Democrats of the Left / Democratic Party
  - New Centre-Right / Popular Alternative
  - Five Star Movement
  - Article One
  - Independent

Coalitions:

- 1946–1994:
  - Centrist coalition
  - Organic centre-left
  - Pentapartito / Quadripartito
  - Mixed coalition
- 1994–present:
  - Centre-right coalition
  - Centre-left coalition
  - Mixed coalition

Portrait	Name (Born–Died)	Term of office			Party	Government	Ref.
Portrait	Name (Born–Died)	Took office	Left office	Time in office	Party	Government	Ref.
Minister of Health
	Vincenzo Monaldi (1899–1969)	14 August 1958	16 February 1959	186 days	Christian Democracy	Fanfani II	
	Camillo Giardina (1907–1985)	16 February 1959	21 February 1962	3 years, 5 days	Christian Democracy	Segni II; Tambroni; Fanfani III	
	Angelo Raffaele Jervolino (1890–1985)	21 February 1962	4 December 1963	1 year, 286 days	Christian Democracy	Fanfani IV; Leone I	
	Giacomo Mancini (1916–2002)	4 December 1963	22 July 1964	231 days	Italian Socialist Party	Moro I	
	Luigi Mariotti (1912–2004)	22 July 1964	24 June 1968	3 years, 338 days	Italian Socialist Party	Moro II·III	
	Ennio Zelioli-Lanzini (1899–1976)	24 June 1968	12 December 1968	171 days	Christian Democracy	Leone II	
	Camillo Ripamonti (1919–1997)	12 December 1968	23 March 1970	1 year, 101 days	Christian Democracy	Rumor I	
	Camillo Ripamonti (1919–1997)	12 December 1968	23 March 1970	1 year, 101 days	Christian Democracy	Rumor II	
	Luigi Mariotti (1912–2004)	27 March 1970	17 February 1972	1 year, 327 days	Italian Socialist Party	Rumor III; Colombo	
	Athos Valsecchi (1919–1985)	17 February 1972	26 June 1972	130 days	Christian Democracy	Andreotti I	
	Remo Gaspari (1921–2011)	26 July 1972	7 July 1973	346 days	Christian Democracy	Andreotti II	
	Luigi Gui (1914–2010)	7 July 1973	14 March 1974	250 days	Christian Democracy	Rumor IV	
	Vittorino Colombo (1925–1996)	14 March 1974	23 November 1974	254 days	Christian Democracy	Rumor V	
	Antonio Pietro Gullotti (1922–1989)	23 November 1974	12 February 1976	1 year, 81 days	Christian Democracy	Moro IV	
	Luciano Dal Falco (1925–1992)	12 February 1976	11 March 1978	2 years, 27 days	Christian Democracy	Moro V Andreotti III	
	Tina Anselmi (1927–2016)	11 March 1978	4 August 1979	1 year, 146 days	Christian Democracy	Andreotti IV·V	
	Renato Altissimo (1940–2015)	4 August 1979	4 April 1980	244 days	Italian Liberal Party	Cossiga I	
	Aldo Aniasi (1921–2005)	4 April 1980	28 June 1981	1 year, 85 days	Italian Socialist Party	Cossiga II; Forlani	
	Renato Altissimo (1940–2015)	28 June 1981	4 August 1983	2 years, 37 days	Italian Liberal Party	Spadolini I·II; Fanfani V	
	Costante Degan (1930–1988)	4 August 1983	1 August 1986	2 years, 362 days	Christian Democracy	Craxi I	
	Carlo Donat-Cattin (1919–1989)	1 August 1986	22 July 1989	2 years, 355 days	Christian Democracy	Craxi II	
	Carlo Donat-Cattin (1919–1989)	1 August 1986	22 July 1989	2 years, 355 days	Christian Democracy	Fanfani VI	
	Carlo Donat-Cattin (1919–1989)	1 August 1986	22 July 1989	2 years, 355 days	Christian Democracy	Goria; De Mita	
	Francesco De Lorenzo (1938– )	22 July 1989	21 February 1993	3 years, 214 days	Italian Liberal Party	Andreotti VI·VII; Amato I	
	Raffaele Costa (1936–2026)	21 February 1993	28 April 1993	66 days	Italian Liberal Party	Amato I	
	Maria Pia Garavaglia (1947– )	28 April 1993	10 May 1994	1 year, 12 days	Christian Democracy / Italian People's Party	Ciampi	
	Raffaele Costa (1936–2026)	10 May 1994	17 January 1995	252 days	Forza Italia	Berlusconi I	
	Elio Guzzanti (1920–2014)	17 January 1995	17 May 1996	1 year, 121 days	Independent	Dini	
	Rosy Bindi (1951– )	17 May 1996	25 April 2000	3 years, 344 days	Italian People's Party	Prodi I D'Alema I·II	
	Umberto Veronesi (1925–2016)	25 April 2000	11 June 2001	1 year, 47 days	Independent	Amato II	
	Girolamo Sirchia (1933– )	11 June 2001	23 April 2005	3 years, 316 days	Independent	Berlusconi II	
	Francesco Storace (1959– )	23 April 2005	10 March 2006	321 days	National Alliance	Berlusconi III	
	Silvio Berlusconi (1936–2023) As Prime Minister	11 March 2006	17 May 2006	67 days	Forza Italia	Berlusconi III	
	Livia Turco (1955– )	17 May 2006	8 May 2008	1 year, 357 days	Democrats of the Left / Democratic Party	Prodi II	
Minister of Labour, Health and Social Affairs
	Maurizio Sacconi (1950– )	8 May 2008	15 December 2009	1 year, 221 days	The People of Freedom	Berlusconi IV	
Minister of Health
	Ferruccio Fazio (1944– )	15 December 2009	16 November 2011	1 year, 336 days	Independent	Berlusconi IV	
	Renato Balduzzi (1954– )	16 November 2011	28 April 2013	1 year, 163 days	Independent	Monti	
	Beatrice Lorenzin (1971– )	28 April 2013	1 June 2018	5 years, 34 days	The People of Freedom / New Centre-Right / Popular Alternative	Letta	
	Beatrice Lorenzin (1971– )	28 April 2013	1 June 2018	5 years, 34 days	The People of Freedom / New Centre-Right / Popular Alternative	Renzi; Gentiloni	
	Giulia Grillo (1975– )	1 June 2018	5 September 2019	1 year, 96 days	Five Star Movement	Conte I	
	Roberto Speranza (1979– )	5 September 2019	22 October 2022	3 years, 47 days	Article One	Conte II; Draghi	
	Orazio Schillaci (1966– )	22 October 2022	Incumbent	3 years, 324 days	Independent	Meloni	

== See also ==
- Ministry of Health (Italy)
