= Vincenzo Monaldi =

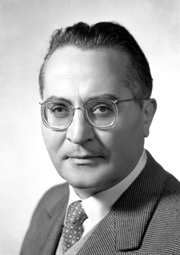

Minister of Health
- In office 14 August 1958 – 15 February 1959
- Prime Minister: Amintore Fanfani
- Succeeded by: Camillo Giardina

Senator of the Republic
- In office 8 May 1948 – 4 June 1968
- Constituency: Campania

Personal details
- Born: 16 April 1899 Monte Vidon Combatte, Italy
- Died: 7 November 1969 (aged 70) Naples, Italy
- Party: Christian Democracy
- Education: Sapienza University of Rome
- Profession: physician and physiologist

Vincenzo Monaldi (16 April 1899, in Monte Vidon Combatte, Marche – 7 November 1969) was an Italian physician and physiologist. His family lived in Grottazzolina, some of his relatives still live there, two brothers Giulio and Francesco Monaldi emigrated to Argentina.

== Biography ==
He fought in the First World War, while he studied, obtaining a military award, the Croce di Guerra. In 1925 he obtained his medicine degree and specialized in treating Tuberculosis and illness of the respiratory system. He established the academic journal "Archivio di fisiologia", which is still one of the top journals in the field, now called "Monaldi Archives of Chest Disease." He gathered international fame and was named member of the Royal Society of Medicine in London and others in Italy and Germany. He was assistant at the Physiology Institute of Rome, then he went on to Naples as professor and director of "Principe di Piemonte" sanatorium (now "Ospedale Monaldi").

== Political life ==
He was Mayor of his home town Grottazzolina when he was just 20 years old, the youngest mayor in Italy. He joined the Italian People's Party of Don Luigi Sturzo then the Democrazia Cristiana. He was elected senator in 1948, holding important positions in government until he became High Commissioner for Hygiene and then became the first Italian Minister of Health in the Fanfani II Cabinet.

== Last years ==
When Vincenzo Monaldi left political activity, he returned to practice as a doctor and teacher. He died in Naples in 1969. Today, the "Principe di Piemonte" sanatorium is named after him.
