= Giuseppe Medici =

Italian politician and economist

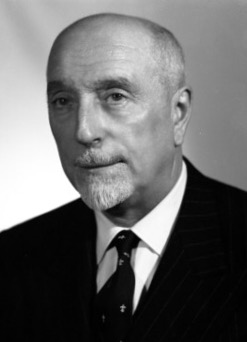

Minister of Foreign Affairs
- In office 26 July 1972 – 7 July 1973
- Prime Minister: Giulio Andreotti
- Preceded by: Aldo Moro
- Succeeded by: Aldo Moro
- In office 24 June 1968 – 12 December 1968
- Prime Minister: Aldo Moro
- Preceded by: Amintore Fanfani
- Succeeded by: Pietro Nenni

Minister for Public Administration Reform
- In office 21 February 1962 – 16 May 1963
- Prime Minister: Amintore Fanfani
- Preceded by: Tiziano Tessitori
- Succeeded by: Roberto Lucifredi

Minister of Industry and Commerce
- In office 5 December 1963 – 5 March 1965
- Prime Minister: Aldo Moro
- Preceded by: Giuseppe Togni
- Succeeded by: Edgardo Lami Starnuti

Minister of Public Education
- In office 15 February 1959 – 26 July 1960
- Prime Minister: Antonio Segni; Fernando Tambroni
- Preceded by: Aldo Moro
- Succeeded by: Giacinto Bosco

Minister of Budget
- In office 1 July 1958 – 15 February 1959
- Prime Minister: Fernando Tambroni
- Preceded by: Amintore Fanfani
- Succeeded by: Adone Zoli
- In office 21 June 1963 – 4 December 1963
- Prime Minister: Antonio Giolitti
- Preceded by: Giovanni Leone
- Succeeded by: Ugo La Malfa

Minister of Treasury
- In office 16 February 1956 – 1 July 1958
- Prime Minister: Giulio Andreotti
- Preceded by: Antonio Segni; Adone Zoli
- Succeeded by: Ezio Vanoni

Minister of Agriculture
- In office 18 January 1954 – 2 July 1955
- Prime Minister: Emilio Colombo
- Preceded by: Amintore Fanfani; Mario Scelba
- Succeeded by: Rocco Salomone

Member of the Senate
- In office 8 May 1948 – 4 July 1976

Personal details
- Born: 24 October 1907 Sassuolo, Italy
- Died: 21 August 2000 (aged 92) Modena, Italy
- Party: Christian Democracy
- Profession: Politician

Giuseppe Medici (24 October 1907 – 21 August 2000) was an Italian politician and economist.

== Biography ==
He was born in Sassuolo, in the province of Modena, to Agostino Medici and Ersilia Messori, the second of four children. In 1926, after graduating as a surveyor at the Guarini Institute in Modena, he enrolled at the "Istituto Superiore Agrario di Milano" where he graduated in Agricultural Sciences in 1929, with a thesis on the economy of irrigation in the Lombard plain. Once military obligations were fulfilled, he briefly taught at the Technical Institute for Surveyors of Piacenza. In 1930 he published numerous publications and in 1931 he became the assistant of Giuseppe Tassinari; the following year he was a lecturer in agricultural economics and politics at the University of Bologna. In 1933 he won the competition for the chair at the University of Perugia and was then called to teach at the University of Turin.

In 1934 he published the Introduction to Agrarian Estimation which was a prelude to the Principles of Estimation of 1948, a text that will know many editions and will be adopted in numerous schools. In that same year he married Grazia Fiandri, with whom he had three children. In 1940 he wrote numerous agricultural voices in the Dictionary of Politics of the National Fascist Party. He was head of the Research Office of the Ministry of Agriculture, actively participated in the drafting of the civil code of 1942. The provisions of Book V in matters of agricultural law were set up by a subcommittee in which Medici had a prominent role, and great part of those rules were drafted by him in person.

Doctors also carried out a scientific activity focused on the themes of agriculture, agrarian reform and land reclamation. In July 1943 he took part in the work that led to the drafting of the Code of Camaldoli.

In 1960 he was called to hold the chair of Economic and Financial Policy of the Faculty of Political Science at the Sapienza University of Rome and became president of the National Academy of Agriculture.

From 1945 onwards he had more and more frequent relations with political circles thanks above all to agricultural skills: he was called by Manlio Rossi Doria to give his contribution to the solution of the problems of the agricultural economy in Italy and was included in the Italian delegation which in 1947 he went to the United States to discuss the Marshall Plan.

Initially close to the Italian Liberal Party, Medici then decided to join the Christian Democracy.

In 1948 he was elected Senator and held office until 1976. Medici served numerous times as Minister: he was Minister of Agriculture (Fanfani I Cabinet and Scelba Cabinet), Minister of Treasury (Leone II Cabinet and Andreotti II Cabinet), Minister of Budget (Fanfani II Cabinet), Minister of Public Education (Segni II Cabinet), Minister of Public Administration (Fanfani IV Cabinet), Minister of Industry (Moro I Cabinet and Moro II Cabinet) and Minister of Foreign Affairs (Andreotti II Cabinet).

He declined to run for re-election in 1976. Following his retirement from politics, he returned to academia and served as a professor emeritus at Sapienza University of Rome. He was also President of Montedison from 1977 to 1980.

He was also president of the Bolognese economic studies firm "Nomisma" from 1984 to 1995 and honorary president from 1995 until his death.

He died on 21 August 2000 at the age of 92.
