= Orazio Schillaci =

Italian politician (born 1966)

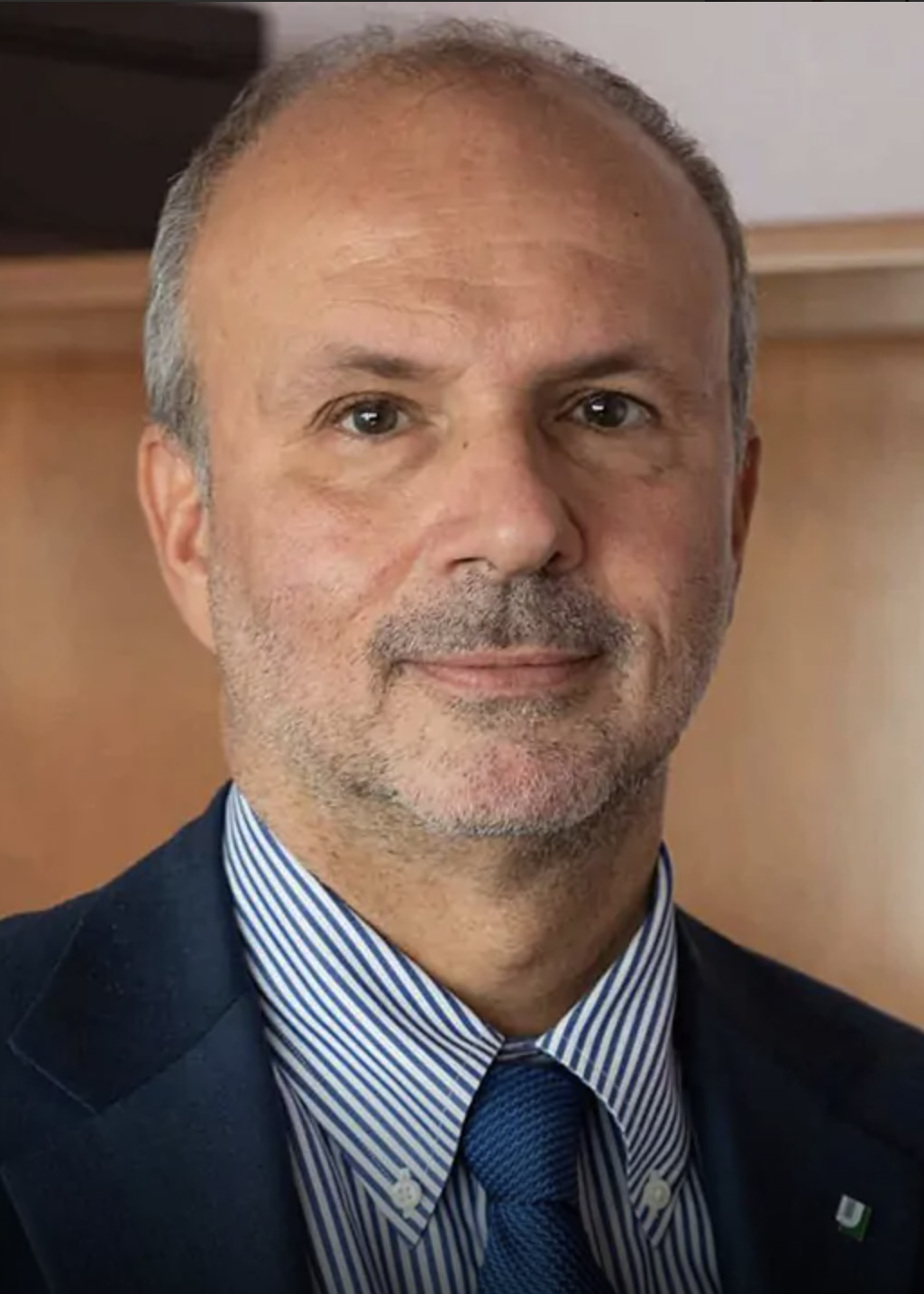
- Official portrait, 2022

Minister of Health
- Incumbent
- Assumed office 22 October 2022
- Prime Minister: Giorgia Meloni
- Preceded by: Roberto Speranza

Rector of University of Rome Tor Vergata
- In office 1 November 2019 – 22 October 2022
- Preceded by: Giuseppe Novelli
- Succeeded by: Roberto Longo (pro tempore)

Personal details
- Born: 27 April 1966 (age 60) Rome, Italy
- Party: Independent
- Education: Sapienza University
- Profession: University professor, doctor

Orazio Schillaci (born 27 April 1966) is an Italian politician who has been Minister of Health in the Meloni government since October 2022.

== Early life and career ==
Schillaci was born on 27 April 1966 in Rome. In 1990, he graduated in medicine and surgery at Sapienza University, where he then obtained in 1994 the specialization in nuclear medicine; until 2001, he was a researcher at the University of L'Aquila. In 2001, he moved to the University of Rome Tor Vergata as associate professor of nuclear medicine. From 2007, he became full professor. In 2008, he was director of the school of specialization in nuclear medicine. In the three-year period from 2006 to 2009, he was an expert member of the Superior Health Council. From 2011 to 2019, he was vice president and then president of the faculty of medicine and surgery of the University of Rome Tor Vergata, and in 2019 was elected rector of the same university.

== Minister of Health ==
In October 2022, Schillaci was appointed Minister of Health in Prime Minister Giorgia Meloni's government. In September 2023, it was reported in Science that evidence of possible scientific misconduct in the form of duplicated images had been found in eight scientific articles published by Schillaci between 2018 and 2022.

In January 2024, as Minister of Health, Schillaci ordered an inspection to verify the prescription methods of the Careggi University Hospital and to hold a roundtable discussion on the "pathways related to the treatment of children with gender dysphoria and the use of the drug triptorelin." The goal of the roundtable discussion was to make the standardize the management and the pharmacological approach with respect to the treatment of persons with gender dysphoria and gender variance. The drug triptorelin is a puberty-blocking medication to prevent or stop development of the body changes associated with puberty. The technical name for puberty blockers is gonadotropin releasing hormone analogues (GnRHa). Treatment of transgender adolescents with puberty blockers is fairly new and iittle information is available regarding long-term outcomes; however, these medications have been successfully used to treat precocious puberty with few side effects]. As of January 2014, Italy has 23 recognized centers for the treatment of gender dysphoria.
