= Fourth Fanfani government =

17th government of the Italian Republic

Fanfani IV Cabinet
- 17th Cabinet of Italy

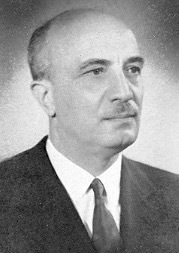
- Date formed: 22 February 1962
- Date dissolved: 22 June 1963

People and organisations
- Head of state: Giovanni Gronchi; Antonio Segni
- Head of government: Amintore Fanfani
- Total no. of members: 23
- Member parties: DC, PSDI, PRI; External support: PSI
- Status in legislature: Coalition government
- Opposition parties: PCI, MSI, PLI, PDIUM

History
- Outgoing election: 1963 election
- Legislature term: Legislature III (1958–1963)
- Predecessor: Fanfani III Cabinet
- Successor: Leone I Cabinet

The Fanfani IV Cabinet was the 17th cabinet of the Italian Republic, which held office from 22 February 1962 to 22 June 1963, for a total of 485 days, or 1 year and 4 months.

The government was presented to the chambers on 2 March 1962. The trust was voted in the Chamber of Deputies on 10 March, which was approved with 295 votes in favor, 195 against and the abstention of the PSI, while in the Senate the vote of trust took place on 15 March, which was approved with 122 votes in favor and 68 against.

On 18 June the Council of Ministers approved the law for the nationalization of electricity, one of the main points of the PSI program and which was approved by the parliament in November, and the Electricity Authority was established with the consequent transfer to it of the electrical industries. At the end of November there was a reshuffle with the replacement of some ministers and some undersecretaries and the changes were approved by the Chamber on 5 December by the Senate on 6 December.

From 4 to 8 January 1963 meetings between the secretaries of the respective parties were held in order to find a compromise between the various parties that supported the government to define how to conclude the legislature. In particular there were disagreements between DC and PSI on the law for the implementation of the regional order, that the DC would like to condition to the breaking of the PSI with the PCI in the local institutions. However, given the now close conclusion of the legislature, the PSI excluded the government crisis.

The parliament was dissolved on 18 February and the president Antonio Segni announced early election.

== Party breakdown ==
- Christian Democracy (DC): prime minister, deputy prime minister, 18 ministers, 32 undersecretaries
- Italian Democratic Socialist Party (PSDI): 3 ministers, 5 undersecretaries
- Italian Republican Party (PRI): 2 ministers, 1 undersecretary

== Composition ==
Office	Name	Party	Term
Prime Minister	Amintore Fanfani	DC	22 February 1962–22 June 1963
Deputy Prime Minister	Attilio Piccioni	DC	22 February 1962–22 June 1963
Minister of Foreign Affairs	Antonio Segni	DC	22 February 1962–7 May 1962
Minister of Foreign Affairs	Amintore Fanfani (ad interim)	DC	7 May 1962–29 May 1962
Minister of Foreign Affairs	Attilio Piccioni	DC	29 May 1962–22 June 1963
Minister of the Interior	Paolo Emilio Taviani	DC	22 February 1962–22 June 1963
Minister of Grace and Justice	Giacinto Bosco	DC	22 February 1962–22 June 1963
Minister of Budget	Ugo La Malfa	PRI	22 February 1962–22 June 1963
Minister of Finance	Giuseppe Trabucchi	DC	22 February 1962–22 June 1963
Minister of Treasury	Roberto Tremelloni	PSDI	22 February 1962–22 June 1963
Minister of Defence	Giulio Andreotti	DC	22 February 1962–22 June 1963
Minister of Public Education	Luigi Gui	DC	22 February 1962–22 June 1963
Minister of Public Works	Fiorentino Sullo	DC	22 February 1962–22 June 1963
Minister of Agriculture and Forests	Mariano Rumor	DC	22 February 1962–22 June 1963
Minister of Transport	Bernardo Mattarella	DC	22 February 1962–22 June 1963
Minister of Post and Telecommunications	Lorenzo Spallino	DC	22 February 1962–27 May 1962
Minister of Post and Telecommunications	Guido Corbellini	DC	27 May 1962–30 November 1962
Minister of Post and Telecommunications	Carlo Russo	DC	30 November 1962–22 June 1963
Minister of Industry and Commerce	Emilio Colombo	DC	22 February 1962–22 June 1963
Minister of Health	Angelo Raffaele Jervolino	DC	22 February 1962–22 June 1963
Minister of Foreign Trade	Luigi Preti	PSDI	22 February 1962–22 June 1963
Minister of Merchant Navy	Cino Macrelli	PRI	22 February 1962–22 June 1963
Minister of State Holdings	Giorgio Bo	DC	22 February 1962–22 June 1963
Minister of Labour and Social Security	Virginio Bertinelli	PSDI	22 February 1962–22 June 1963
Minister of Tourism and Entertainment	Alberto Folchi	DC	22 February 1962–22 June 1963
Minister for the South and the Depressed Areas (without portfolio)	Giulio Pastore	DC	22 February 1962–22 June 1963
Minister for Parliamentary Relations (without portfolio)	Giuseppe Codacci Pisanelli	DC	22 February 1962–22 June 1963
Minister for Scientific Research (without portfolio)	Guido Corbellini	DC	22 February 1962–22 June 1963
Minister for Public Administration Reform (without portfolio)	Giuseppe Medici	DC	22 February 1962–22 June 1963
Secretary of the Council of Ministers	Umberto Delle Fave	DC	22 February 1962–22 June 1963
