= Edgardo Lami Starnuti =

Italian lawyer and politician (1887–1968)

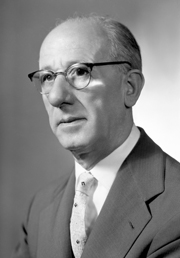

Minister of Industry and Commerce
- In office 5 March 1965 – 23 February 1966
- Prime Minister: Aldo Moro

Minister of State Holdings
- In office 2 July 1958 – 16 February 1959
- Prime Minister: Amintore Fanfani

Personal details
- Born: 3 March 1887 Pontedera, Kingdom of Italy
- Died: 4 May 1968 (aged 81)
- Party: Italian Democratic Socialist Party

Edgardo Lami Starnuti (3 March 1887 – 4 May 1968) was an Italian lawyer and politician. He was a member of Italian Senate for the Italian Democratic Socialist Party (PSDI). He also served as the minister of state holdings and minister of industry and commerce.

== Biography ==
Starnuti was born in Pontedera near Pisa on 3 March 1887. He was a lawyer by profession. During the Fascist rule in Italy he edited a weekly socialist publication, La Battaglia Socialista. He was arrested due to his opposition and detained on Lipari island for two years. He continued his anti-fascist activities after his release. Then he took refuge in Switzerland and could return to Italy in 1945.

He was elected to the Italian Senate on the PSDI list and served there for four terms. He was part of the Forti Commission which dealt with the reorganization of the Italian State in the first legislature. From 2 July 1958 to 16 February 1959 Starnuti served as the minister of state holdings in the cabinet led by Prime Minister Amintore Fanfani. Then he was appointed minister of industry and commerce to the second cabinet of Aldo Moro on 5 March 1965 and held the post until 23 February 1966.

Starnuti was also president of the Milan electricity company and provincial councilor in Milan. He died on 4 May 1968.
