= Camillo Giardina =

Italian politician (1907–1985)

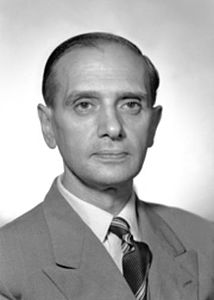

Minister for Reform of Public Administration
- In office 1 July 1958 – 26 January 1959
- Prime Minister: Amintore Fanfani
- Preceded by: Mario Zotta
- Succeeded by: Giorgio Bo

Minister of Health
- In office 15 February 1959 – 21 February 1962
- Prime Minister: Fernando Tambroni
- Preceded by: Vincenzo Monaldi
- Succeeded by: Angelo Raffaele Jervolino

Senator of the Republic
- In office 8 May 1948 – 24 May 1972

Personal details
- Born: 29 March 1907 Pavia, Italy
- Died: 26 February 1985 (aged 77)
- Party: Christian Democracy
- Education: University of Palermo
- Profession: Professor

Camillo Giardina (March 29, 1907 – February 26, 1985) was an Italian Christian Democrat politician. He was minister of health (1959–1962) in the Government of Italy.

== Biography ==
Son of a doctor and academic from the University of Pavia, Andrea Giardina, originally from Sicily, active in the Catholic movement and member of the People's Party. The family moved to Palermo and in 1929, Camillo Giardina obtained a degree in law from the city university.

In 1931 he obtained the free lecturer in history of law; first at the University of Urbino, until 1933, and then at that of Messina, where he remained until 1937, the year in which he became full professor. In 1940 he was called to the chair of the history of Italian law in Palermo, where he remained until the end academic career.

In 1942 he joined the underground movement of the Christian Democrats, a party of which he became a leading exponent. Provincial secretary from 1946 to 1948, he was elected Senator in the first legislature and re-elected consecutively until 1963.

He served as Minister for Reform of Public Administration in the Zoli government and as Minister of Health in the Tambroni government.
