= Mario Zotta =

Italian politician (1904–1963)

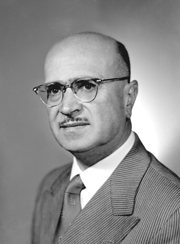
Mario Zotta

Mario Zotta (6 November 1904 – 21 February 1963) was an Italian politician. Zotta was born in Pietragalla. He represented the Christian Democracy party in the Constituent Assembly of Italy from 1946 to 1948 and in the Senate of the Republic from 1948 to 1963.
