= Rocco Salomone =

American football coach (1965-2015)

Biographical details
- Born: January 17, 1965; Silver Spring, Maryland, U.S.
- Died: February 4, 2015 (aged 50); Brockport, New York, U.S.
- Education: Brockport

Coaching career (HC unless noted)
- 1988: Brockport (GA)
- 1989: Camp Hill HS (PA) (OL)
- 1990–1994: Brockport (DC/RB)
- 1995–2012: Brockport
- 2014: Susquehanna (DC)

Head coaching record
- Overall: 103–80–1
- Bowls: 1–0
- Tournaments: 2–4 (NCAA D-III playoffs)

Accomplishments and honors

Championships
- 1 ACFC (2005)

Rocco Salomone (January 17, 1965 – February 4, 2015) was an American football coach. He served as the head football coach at The College at Brockport, State University of New York in Brockport, New York from 1995 to 2012, where he completed a record of 103–80–1.

Salomone was a Brockport graduate who had previously served as an assistant coach at his alma mater.

Salomone also spent one season in 2014 as the defensive coordinator at Susquehanna University in Selinsgrove, Pennsylvania.

== Head coaching record ==
| Year | Team | Overall | Conference | Standing | Bowl/playoffs |
|---|---|---|---|---|---|
Brockport Golden Eagles (NCAA Division III independent) (1995–2003)
| 1995 | Brockport | 4–5–1 | | | |
| 1996 | Brockport | 6–4 | | | |
| 1997 | Brockport | 6–4 | | | |
| 1998 | Brockport | 3–6 | | | |
| 1999 | Brockport | 6–4 | | | |
| 2000 | Brockport | 8–1 | | | L NCAA Division III First Round |
| 2001 | Brockport | 9–2 | | | L NCAA Division III First Round |
| 2002 | Brockport | 10–3 | | | L NCAA Division III Quarterfinal |
| 2003 | Brockport | 9–2 | | | L NCAA Division III First Round |
Brockport Golden Eagles (Atlantic Central Football Conference) (2004–2007)
| 2004 | Brockport | 6–4 | 3–2 | 3rd | |
| 2005 | Brockport | 5–5 | 4–1 | T–1st | |
| 2006 | Brockport | 4–6 | 2–2 | T–2nd | |
| 2006 | Brockport | 5–5 | 2–2 | 3rd | |
Brockport Golden Eagles (New Jersey Athletic Conference) (2008–2012)
| 2008 | Brockport | 7–4 | 6–3 | T–4th | W ECAC Bowl |
| 2009 | Brockport | 4–6 | 3–6 | T–6th | |
| 2010 | Brockport | 2–8 | 2–7 | T–8th | |
| 2011 | Brockport | 3–7 | 3–6 | T–7th | |
| 2012 | Brockport | 6–4 | 4–4 | 5th | |
| Brockport: | | 103–80–1 | 29–33 | | |
| Total: | | 103–80–1 | | | |
National championship Conference title Conference division title or championship game berth
