= Giuseppe Spataro =

Italian politician (1897–1979)

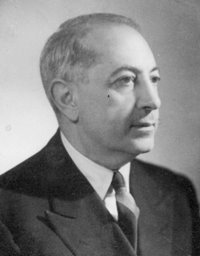

Minister of Transport
- In office 26 July 1960 – 21 February 1962
- Prime Minister: Amintore Fanfani
- Preceded by: Mario Ferrari Aggradi
- Succeeded by: Bernardo Mattarella

Minister of the Interior
- In office 25 March 1960 – 26 July 1960
- Prime Minister: Fernando Tambroni
- Preceded by: Antonio Segni
- Succeeded by: Mario Scelba

Minister of Merchant Navy
- In office 1 July 1958 – 15 February 1959
- Prime Minister: Amintore Fanfani
- Preceded by: Gennaro Cassiani
- Succeeded by: Angelo Raffaele Jervolino

Italian Minister of Public Works
- In office 16 July 1953 – 2 August 1953
- Prime Minister: Acide De Gasperi
- Preceded by: Salvatore Aldisio
- Succeeded by: Umberto Merlin

Minister of Post and Telecommunications
- In office 27 January 1950 – 7 July 1953
- Prime Minister: Acide De Gasperi
- Preceded by: Angelo Raffaele Jervolino
- Succeeded by: Giuseppe Togni
- In office 15 February 1959 – 23 March 1960
- Prime Minister: Antonio Segni
- Preceded by: Alberto Simonini
- Succeeded by: Antonio Maxia

Member of the Senate of the Republic
- In office 28 April 1963 – 4 July 1976
- Constituency: Lanciano-Vasto

Member of the Chamber of Deputies
- In office 8 May 1948 – 28 April 1963

Member of the Constituent Assembly
- In office 25 June 1946 – 31 January 1948

Personal details
- Born: 12 June 1897 Vasto, Italy
- Died: 30 January 1979 (aged 81) Rome, Italy
- Party: Christian Democracy
- Spouse: Letizia De Giorgio
- Children: 3
- Education: Sapienza University of Rome

Giuseppe Spataro (12 June 1897 – 30 January 1979) was an Italian politician.

== Biography ==
Spataro was born in Vasto, Italy to Anna and Alfonso Nasci, who were a high-class Italian family, in the urban center within the province Chieti.

After studying in his birth city of Vasto, Spataro transferred to a boarding school called Montecassino in 1908, the adjustment to this new life made easier by the death of his father in 1910. In 1914, Spataro moved to Rome to study Law and graduated in 1919.

During the First World War, Spataro initially served as a "corpo specializzato del Genio" and was later promoted as an official.

Already distinguished within the main catholic-roman journalist firms, he became an exponent member of FUCI. In 1919, he was elected vice president, later advanced as president of FUCI in 1920. Following his presidency at FUCI, Spataro was elected vice-president at another organization called Pax Romana. Eventually, Spataro’s close relations with Luigi Sturzo- led to his membership to the Roman sector of the Italian People's Party in 1919. From 1921 to 1925, Spataro served as the sole national vice-secretary.

In 1923, Spataro married Letizia De Giorgio. Together, the couple had 3 children: Alfonso, Anna and PierGiorgio. Following his marriage, in June 1925, Spataro became the principal organizer of the international “V” congress of the party. Soon after, from 1945-1946, he became the vice secretary of internal affairs, in 1946, he was elected member of the National council and president of RAI. Through his control of this radio, and then television programming, Spataro was able to create the basis for his future Democratic-Christian control over the media. He held this post, until 1950, when he stepped down as president of RAI, in order to assume the minister of communications role. In 1953, Spataro became minister of public works, and between 1953-1954, Spataro was the vice secretary of Christian Democratic political party. In 1960, he became the minister of Merchant Navy and the minister of internal affairs as well as the minister of transport. In 1959, Spataro resumed his office as minister of telecommunications until 1962. From 1964 until his death in 1979, Spataro served as president of the Istituto Luigi Sturzo, in Rome.
