= Fernando Tambroni =

Italian politician (1901–1963)

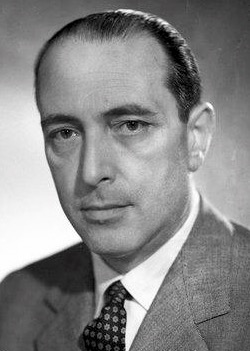

Prime Minister of Italy
- In office 26 March 1960 – 27 July 1960
- President: Giovanni Gronchi
- Preceded by: Antonio Segni
- Succeeded by: Amintore Fanfani

Minister of Budget
- In office 15 February 1959 – 27 July 1960
- Prime Minister: Antonio Segni; Himself
- Preceded by: Giuseppe Medici
- Succeeded by: Giuseppe Pella

Minister of the Treasury
- In office 16 February 1959 – 26 March 1960
- Prime Minister: Antonio Segni
- Preceded by: Giulio Andreotti
- Succeeded by: Paolo Emilio Taviani

Minister of the Interior
- In office 6 July 1955 – 16 February 1959
- Prime Minister: Antonio Segni; Adone Zoli; Amintore Fanfani
- Preceded by: Mario Scelba
- Succeeded by: Antonio Segni

Minister of Merchant Navy
- In office 17 August 1953 – 6 July 1955
- Prime Minister: Giuseppe Pella; Amintore Fanfani; Mario Scelba
- Preceded by: Bernardo Mattarella
- Succeeded by: Gennaro Cassiani
Member of the Parliament
Member of the Chamber of Deputies
In office 8 May 1948 – 18 February 1963
Constituency	Ancona–Pesaro–Macerata–Ascoli Piceno
Member of the Constituent Assembly
In office 25 June 1946 – 31 January 1948
Constituency	Ancona–Pesaro–Macerata–Ascoli Piceno

Personal details
- Born: Fernando Tambroni Armaroli; 25 November 1901 Ascoli Piceno, Kingdom of Italy
- Died: 18 February 1963 (aged 61) Rome, Italy
- Party: PPI (1919–1923); PNF (1932–1943); DC (1943–1963)
- Spouse: Mafalda Giacopelli
- Children: 2
- Education: University of Macerata

Fernando Tambroni Armaroli (Italian: [ferˈnando tamˈbroːni armaˈrɔːli]; 25 November 1901 – 18 February 1963) was an Italian politician. A member of Christian Democracy, he served as the 36th Prime Minister of Italy from March to July 1960. He also served as Minister of the Interior from July 1955 until February 1959, Minister of Budget and Treasury from February 1959 to March 1960, and Minister of the Merchant Navy from August 1953 until July 1955.

Despite having started his political career as a reformist and supporter of centre-left economic policies, while in government he became a right-wing, conservative politician, implementing law and order policies. Moreover, he was accused as Interior Minister of having created his own secret police to produce dossiers on his political opponents. His role as Prime Minister is best remembered for the riots which resulted from the possibility that he might look to the neo-fascist Italian Social Movement for support against the parliamentary left.

== Early life ==
Tambroni was born in Ascoli Piceno, Marche, Kingdom of Italy, in 1901. His father, Arturo Tambroni, was the director of a youth re-educational institute, while her mother Amalia Laurenti was a housewife. After attending the classical lyceum, he studied law at the University of Macerata, where he graduated a few years later. In those years he became a member of the Italian People's Party (PPI), the Christian-democratic party led by Don Luigi Sturzo, of which he was appointed provincial secretary for Macerata. He served also as vice president of the Italian Catholic Federation of University Students (FUCI), under the presidency of Giuseppe Spataro.

=== Fascist regime ===
In November 1926, after the dissolution of the PPI imposed by the Fascist regime in Italy, Tambroni published an article on the Corriere Adriatico, in which he declared that he had "abjured [his] previous political ideals" and that he had become uninterested in any activity contrary to the fascist regime. He described Benito Mussolini as "the man designated by the providence of God". After a few years, in 1932, he joined the National Fascist Party (PNF). Once the regime had fallen, he declared that he had not written the article willingly but had been forced to do so by PNF bosses' threats.

Tambroni entered the legal profession in 1923. He started out in the law firm of Augusto Giardini. During the 1920s, he became a rather well-known and appreciated criminal defense lawyer. In 1927, he welcomed his sister Rina, the second female lawyer in Ancona, as a colleague in the firm. After the war, Rina would take over the running of the firm. During these years, Tambroni married Mafalda Giacopelli. Two daughters were born to the couple: Maria Grazia and Gabriella.

The Second World War found Tambroni serving in the Voluntary Militia for National Security (MVSN), commonly known as the Blackshirts, the paramilitary wing of the PNF. His squad was an anti-aircraft battery in the Ancona area. Once the Duce had been overthrown in July 1943, Tambroni left the PNF and did not follow Mussolini in the Italian Social Republic, returning instead to more moderate political activity and contributing in December 1943 to the foundation of Christian Democracy (DC), the new centrist and Catholic party led by Alcide De Gasperi. Tambroni soon became one of the main DC figures in the Marche region.

== Political career ==
In the 1946 Italian general election, he was elected in the Constituent Assembly of Italy for the constituency of Ancona–Pesaro–Macerata–Ascoli Piceno, receiving almost 20,500 votes. In the Constituent Assembly, he was appointed in the electoral commission and then in the 4th commission for bills' examination.

In the 1948 Italian general election, he was elected in the Chamber of Deputies with more than 45,000 votes. In these years, he became a vocal critic of De Gasperi's policies, advocating for more incisive social reforms. Between June 1948 and January 1950, he served as vice-president of the public works commission of the Chamber, therefore, from January 1950 to July 1953, under-secretary of the Merchant Navy in the sixth and seventh governments chaired by Alcide De Gasperi.

=== Minister of Merchant Navy ===
In the 1953 Italian general election, the government coalition won 49.9% of national vote, just a few thousand votes of the threshold for a supermajority, resulting in an ordinary proportional distribution of the seats. Technically, the government won the election, winning a clear working majority of seats in both houses, but frustration with the failure to win a supermajority caused significant tensions in the leading coalition, which ended on 2 August, when De Gasperi was forced to resign by the Parliament. On 17 August, President Luigi Einaudi appointed Giuseppe Pella as new Prime Minister, while Tambroni became Minister of Merchant Navy. He would remain in office until July 1955, serving also in the governments of Amintore Fanfani and Mario Scelba.

As minister, he approved the so-called "Tambroni law", which for the first time attempted to resolve the shipyards situation, with a 10 year concession of tax relief and state aids to encourage the reduction of production costs, promoting their competitiveness in the international market.

=== Minister of the Interior ===
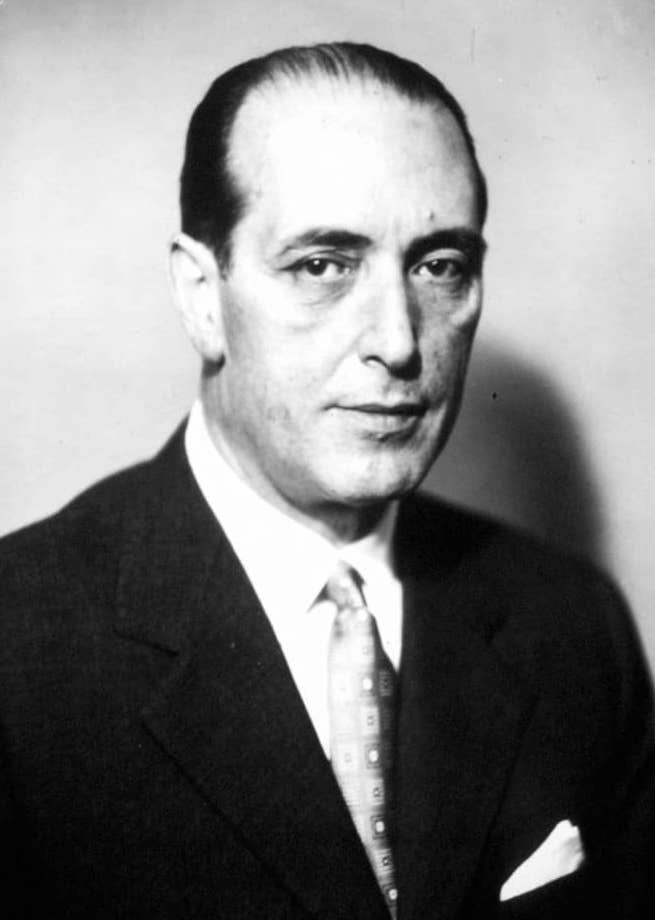
Tambroni in 1950

In July 1955, the newly appointed Prime Minister, Antonio Segni, selected Tambroni as his Minister of the Interior. Tambroni would remain at the Viminale Palace until February 1959, serving also in the cabinets of Adone Zoli and Amintore Fanfani.

During his ministry, he was accused of using prefects in favor of the political interest of the government and his party. In 1956, he sent a confidential note to all Italian prefects inviting them to produce a report that not only illustrated the political ideals of the population, but also indicated measures that "could be implemented before the 1957 local elections to favorably influence voters, with the aim of starting a more effective fight against communism. He also created an ad hoc office, with some of his close and trusted advisors. Politicians, militants and citizens with leftist sympathies and ideas ended up in these files, but dossiers were also opened on party comrades and politicians close to the DC, to have instruments of conditioning, if not blackmail, other politicians.

As minister, he organized the electoral campaign of the 1958 Italian general election. He also approved interventions on municipal laws and local finances, prepared plans for reforming public assistance and Protezione Civile law and reorganized the Vigili del Fuoco, the Italian firefighters corp. Tambroni authorized also the translation of Mussolini's body in the family chapel in Predappio and dissolved the city council of Naples, earning the hostility of mayor Achille Lauro.

During these years, he was ranked among the main supporters of centre-left politics, becoming a close ally of Amintore Fanfani. In 1956, speaking at the party congress in Trento, he openly supported an alliance with the Italian Socialist Party (PSI), calling for an "innovative government program" and describing the centrist policies as "absurd".

In January 1959, a conspicuous group of Christian Democrats started voting against their own government, forcing Fanfani to resign on 26 January 1959, after only six months in power. On 16 February, Antonio Segni sworn in as new Prime Minister and Tambroni was appointed Minister of Budget and Treasury.

== Prime Minister of Italy ==
In March 1960, the Italian Liberal Party (PLI) withdrew its support to his government and Segni was forced to resign. President Giovanni Gronchi gave Tambroni the task of forming a new cabinet. Tambroni formed a one-party cabinet composed only by DC members, with the sole external support of the neo-fascist Italian Social Movement (MSI), a unique case in the history of the Italian Republic.

On 8 April, the Chamber of Deputies gave the confidence vote to government, with the fundamental support of the MSI. However, the neo-fascist vital supported created growing tensions within the DC and with some ministers who threatened their resignations, Tambroni was forced to resign. President Gronchi gave then the task of forming a new cabinet to Fanfani, to verify the possibility of starting a centre-left government. However, he was opposed by an important part of the DC, so Tambroni returned to the Senate, where he received the confidence vote on 29 April.

Tambroni listed among the main focus of his government's program the institution of regions with a special statute for Friuli-Venezia Giulia, the reform of local finances, the modernization of public administration, a wide program of social and economic interventions, the reorganization of the state railways and a new foreign policy to improve bilateral relations with emerging countries like China, India and Arab countries.

Since the beginning, Tambroni's premiership was characterised by a strong social conservatism on social issues, often pursued with authoritarian manners. On 21 May 1960, a rally led by Communist deputy Giancarlo Pajetta was broken up by the police with the total support from the government, causing riots. While on 15 June, the Minister of Culture, Umberto Tupini announced plans to censor all movies with "scandalous subjects, harmful for the consciousness of Italians", including Federico Fellini's La Dolce Vita.

=== Anti-fascist riots ===
The 1960 riots in Genoa

The most controversial decision of his cabinet, was the permission to the MSI to hold its national congress in Genoa, one of the capitals of Italian Resistance against Fascism. This move was considered by the public opinion as a further and unacceptable opening to the neo-fascists, by the government.

On 30 June 1960, a large demonstration summoned by the left-wing CGIL trade union and by other leftist forces in the streets of Genoa was heavily suppressed by the Italian police. Other popular demonstrations in Reggio Emilia, Rome, Palermo, Catania, Licata again saw violent intervention by the police, causing several deaths. On 7 July, while news of the five demonstrators killed in Reggio Emilia (Lauro Farioli, Ovidio Franchi, Marino Serri, Afro Tondelli and Emilio Reverberi) arrived in the Chamber; Tambroni only spoke about "unpleasant incidents", stating the government's willingness was to do "its duty to defend the state and the free institutions". Moreover, the interior minister, Giuseppe Spataro, accused the PCI of having stirred up the riots.

On 8 July, the political situation was so worrying that the President of the Senate, Cesare Merzagora, with an unprecedented practice and not informing the President of the Republic, proposed, finding support also in the President of the Chamber Giovanni Leone, a fifteen-day truce, with the return of the police to the barracks and the consequent stop of anti-fascist protests. This effectively delegitimized the actions of Tambroni and Spataro, and represented the beginning of the government crisis.

On 19 July, when many members of his own party, withdrew their supports to the government, Tambroni was forced to resign, after only 116 days in power.

== Death and legacy ==
After his resignation, Tambroni's political life was de facto concluded and he would never play a key role again. On 18 February 1963, Tambroni died in Rome due to cardiac arrest. A few days earlier, DC's secretary Aldo Moro had informed him that he was going to be excluded from the party list in the 1963 Italian general election. On the following day, the newspaper La Stampa remembered him on the front page as "a cold man with no cordiality. ... Tambroni had always been a loner, with very few really close friends, even when he reached the top of his political career".

Due to his authoritarian stances and his alliance with the neo-fascist MSI, Tambroni has often been regarded as one of the least appreciated Prime Ministers in the history of Italian Republic.

== Electoral history ==
Election	House	Constituency	Party	Votes	Result
1946	Constituent Assembly	Ancona–Pesaro–Macerata–Ascoli Piceno	DC	20,592	Elected
1948	Chamber of Deputies	Ancona–Pesaro–Macerata–Ascoli Piceno	DC	45,606	Elected
1953	Chamber of Deputies	Ancona–Pesaro–Macerata–Ascoli Piceno	DC	82,557	Elected
1958	Chamber of Deputies	Ancona–Pesaro–Macerata–Ascoli Piceno	DC	128,563	Elected

Political offices
Preceded by Bernardo Mattarella	Minister of Merchant Navy; 1953–1955	Succeeded by Gennaro Cassiani
Preceded by Mario Scelba	Minister of the Interior; 1955–1959	Succeeded by Antonio Segni
Preceded by Giulio Andreotti	Minister of Treasury; 1959–1960	Succeeded by Paolo Emilio Taviani
Preceded by Giuseppe Medici	Minister of Budget; 1959–1960	Succeeded by Giuseppe Pella
Preceded by Antonio Segni	Prime Minister of Italy; 1960	Succeeded by Amintore Fanfani
