= Amintore Fanfani =

Italian politician and statesman (1908–1999)

Senator for life Amintore Fanfani
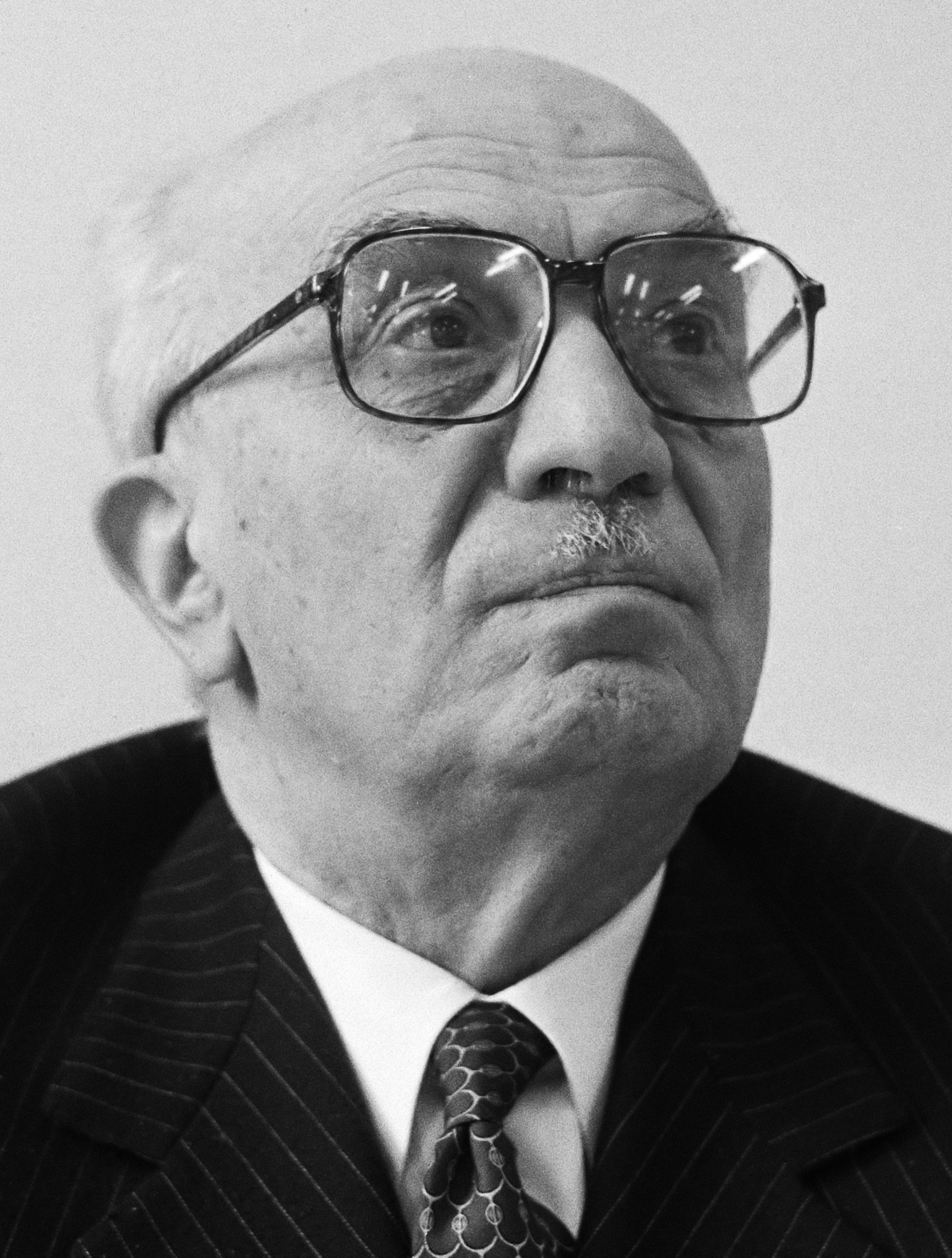
- Fanfani in 1983

Prime Minister of Italy
- In office 18 April 1987 – 29 July 1987
- President: Francesco Cossiga
- Preceded by: Bettino Craxi
- Succeeded by: Giovanni Goria
- In office 1 December 1982 – 4 August 1983
- President: Sandro Pertini
- Preceded by: Giovanni Spadolini
- Succeeded by: Bettino Craxi
- In office 27 July 1960 – 22 June 1963
- President: Giovanni Gronchi; Antonio Segni
- Deputy: Attilio Piccioni
- Preceded by: Fernando Tambroni
- Succeeded by: Giovanni Leone
- In office 2 July 1958 – 16 February 1959
- President: Giovanni Gronchi
- Deputy: Antonio Segni
- Preceded by: Adone Zoli
- Succeeded by: Antonio Segni
- In office 19 January 1954 – 10 February 1954
- President: Luigi Einaudi
- Preceded by: Giuseppe Pella
- Succeeded by: Mario Scelba

Acting President of Italy
- In office 15 June 1978 – 9 July 1978
- Prime Minister: Giulio Andreotti
- Preceded by: Giovanni Leone
- Succeeded by: Sandro Pertini

President of the Senate of the Republic
- In office 9 July 1985 – 17 April 1987
- Preceded by: Francesco Cossiga
- Succeeded by: Giovanni Malagodi
- In office 5 July 1976 – 1 December 1982
- Preceded by: Giovanni Spagnolli
- Succeeded by: Tommaso Morlino
- In office 5 June 1968 – 26 June 1973
- Preceded by: Ennio Zelioli-Lanzini
- Succeeded by: Giovanni Spagnolli
Ministerial offices
Minister of the Budget
In office 13 April 1988 – 23 July 1989
Prime Minister	Ciriaco De Mita
Preceded by	Emilio Colombo
Succeeded by	Paolo Cirino Pomicino
Minister of the Interior
In office 29 July 1987 – 13 April 1988
Prime Minister	Giovanni Goria
Preceded by	Oscar Luigi Scalfaro
Succeeded by	Antonio Gava
In office 16 July 1953 – 19 January 1954
Prime Minister	Alcide De Gasperi; Giuseppe Pella
Preceded by	Mario Scelba
Succeeded by	Giulio Andreotti
Minister of Foreign Affairs
In office 24 February 1966 – 25 June 1968
Prime Minister	Aldo Moro
Preceded by	Aldo Moro
Succeeded by	Giuseppe Medici
In office 5 March 1965 – 30 December 1965
Prime Minister	Aldo Moro
Preceded by	Aldo Moro
Succeeded by	Aldo Moro
In office 2 July 1958 – 16 February 1959
Prime Minister	Himself
Preceded by	Giuseppe Pella
Succeeded by	Giuseppe Pella
Minister of Agriculture
In office 26 July 1951 – 16 July 1953
Prime Minister	Alcide De Gasperi
Preceded by	Antonio Segni
Succeeded by	Rocco Salomone
Minister of Labour
In office 1 June 1947 – 27 January 1950
Prime Minister	Alcide De Gasperi
Preceded by	Giuseppe Romita
Succeeded by	Achille Marazza
Party political offices
Secretary of Christian Democracy
In office 17 June 1973 – 25 July 1975
Preceded by	Arnaldo Forlani
Succeeded by	Benigno Zaccagnini
In office 16 July 1954 – 31 January 1959
Preceded by	Alcide De Gasperi
Succeeded by	Aldo Moro
Parliamentary offices
Member of the Senate of the Republic
Life tenure 10 March 1972 – 20 November 1999
Appointed by	Giovanni Leone
In office 5 June 1968 – 9 March 1972
Constituency	Arezzo
Member of the Chamber of Deputies
In office 8 May 1948 – 4 June 1968
Constituency	Siena–Arezzo–Grosseto
Member of the Constituent Assembly
In office 25 June 1946 – 31 January 1948
Constituency	Siena–Arezzo–Grosseto

Personal details
- Born: 6 February 1908 Pieve Santo Stefano, Tuscany, Kingdom of Italy
- Died: 20 November 1999 (aged 91) Rome, Lazio, Italy
- Party: PNF (1935–1943); DC (1943–1994); PPI (1994–1999)
- Height: 1.63 m (5 ft 4 in)
- Spouses: Biancarosa Provasoli (m. 1939; died 1968) Maria Pia Tavazzani (m. 1975)
- Children: 7
- Education: Catholic University of the Sacred Heart
- Occupation: Politician; economist

Amintore Fanfani (Italian pronunciation: [aˈmintore faɱˈfaːni]; 6 February 1908 – 20 November 1999) was an Italian politician and statesman who served as 32nd prime minister of Italy for five separate terms. He was one of the best-known Italian politicians after the Second World War and a historical figure of the left-wing faction of Christian Democracy. He is also considered one of the founders of the modern Italian centre-left.

Beginning as a protégé of Alcide De Gasperi, Fanfani achieved cabinet rank at a young age and occupied all the major offices of state over the course of a forty-year political career. In foreign policy, he was one of the most vocal supporters of European integration and established closer relations with the Arab world. In domestic policy, he was known for his cooperation with the Italian Socialist Party, which brought to an alliance that radically changed the country, by such measures as the nationalization of Enel, the extension of compulsory education, and the introduction of a more progressive tax system.

Fanfani served in numerous ministerial positions, including Minister of the Interior, Minister of Foreign Affairs, Minister of Labour, Minister of Agriculture, and Minister of Budget and Economic Planning. He served also as president of the Senate of the Republic for three terms between 1968 and 1987. He was appointed senator for life in 1972. Six years later, after the resignation of Giovanni Leone, he provisionally assumed the functions of president of the Italian Republic as chairman of the upper house of the Italian Parliament until the election of Sandro Pertini. Despite his long political experience and personal prestige, Fanfani never succeeded in being elected head of state, and died at the age on 91 on 22 November 1999.

Fanfani and the long-time liberal leader Giovanni Giolitti still hold the record as the only statesmen to have served as prime minister of Italy in five non-consecutive periods of office. He was sometimes nicknamed Cavallo di Razza ("Purebred Horse"), thanks to his innate political ability; however, his detractors simply called him "Pony" due to his small size.

== Early life ==
Fanfani was born in Pieve Santo Stefano, in the province of Arezzo, Tuscany, in a middle-class family. His father, Giuseppe Fanfani (1878–1943), was a carpenter's son who succeeded in studying and graduating in law, starting the profession of lawyer and notary; while his mother Annita Leo (1884–1968) was a housewife. Fanfani, who was the first of nine children, grew up in an observant Catholic family. Fanfani was named after Amintore Galli, who composed the socialist anthem the Workers' Hymn; Fanfani's siblings were similarly named with eclectic or unusual names.

In 1920, at 12 years old, Fanfani joined Catholic Action (AC), of which he became a local leader after a few years. After attending the scientific lyceum of Arezzo, he graduated in political and economic sciences in 1930 at the Catholic University of Milan, with the thesis "Economic Repercussions and Effects of the English Schism". He was the author of a number of important works on economic history dealing with religion and the development of capitalism in the Renaissance and Protestant Reformation in Europe. His thesis was published in Italian and then in English as Catholicism, Protestantism and Capitalism in 1935.

Under the regime of Benito Mussolini, Fanfani joined the National Fascist Party (PNF) supporting the corporatist ideas of the regime promoting collaboration between the classes, which he defended in many articles. He once wrote: "Some day the European continent will be organized into a vast supranational area guided by Italy and Germany. Those areas will take authoritarian governments and synchronize their constitutions with Fascist principles." Fanfani wrote for the official magazine of racism in Fascist Italy, The Defence of the Race (Italian: La difesa della razza). In 1938, he was among the 330 that signed the antisemitic Manifesto of Race (Italian: Manifesto della razza), culminating in laws that stripped the Italian Jews of any position in the government, university, or professions that many previously had. Fanfani also became a professor at the School of Fascist Mysticism in Milan.

On 22 April 1939, Fanfani married Biancarosa Provasoli, a 25-year-old lady who grew up in a bourgeois family from Milan. The couple had two sons and five daughters, born between 1940 and 1955. During the years spent in Milan, Fanfani met Giuseppe Dossetti and Giorgio La Pira. They formed a group known as the "little professors" who lived ascetically in monastery cells and walked barefoot. They formed the nucleus of Democratic Initiative (ID), an intensely Catholic but economically reformist wing of the post-war Christian Democracy (DC) party, holding meetings to discuss Catholicism and society. In Milan, Fanfani wrote "Catholicism and Protestantism in the historical development of Capitalism", in which he proposed a bold interpretation of the phenomena of capitalism, with particular reference to the conditioning of the religious factors and fundamentally disagree with the thesis of Max Weber. This work brought him to the forefront among US Catholics. After the surrender of Italy to the Allied armed forces on 8 September 1943, the group disbanded. Until the liberation of Italy in April 1945, Fanfani fled to Switzerland dodging military service, and organized university courses for Italian refugees.

== Early political career ==
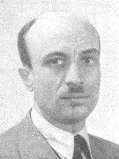
Fanfani in 1948

Upon his return to Italy, Fanfani joined the newly founded DC, of which his friend Dossetti was serving as deputy secretary. He was as one of the youngest party leaders and a protégé of Alcide De Gasperi, the undisputed leader of the party for the following decade. Fanfani represented a particular ideological position, that of conservative Catholics who favoured socio-economic interventionism, which was very influential in the 1950s and 1960s but gradually lost its appeal. He once wrote: "Capitalism requires such a dread of loss, such a forgetfulness of human brotherhood, such a certainty that a man's neighbour is merely a customer to be gained or a rival to be overthrown, and all these are inconceivable in the Catholic conception ... There is an unbridgeable gulf between the Catholic and the capitalist conception of life." In his view, private economic initiative was justifiable only if harnessed to the common good.

In the 1946 Italian general election, Fanfani was elected to the Constituent Assembly for the constituency of Siena–Arezzo–Grosseto, which would remain his political stronghold for all his career. As a constituent, he was appointed in the commission that drafted the text of the new republican Italian Constitution. The first article of the new constitution reflected Fanfani's philosophy. He proposed an article, which read "Italy is a democratic republic founded on labor". In the 1948 Italian general election, he was elected to the Chamber of Deputies, with more than 35,000 votes.

Under De Gasperi, Fanfani took on a succession of ministries. From June 1947 until January 1950, he served as Minister of Labour; while from July 1951 to July 1953, he was Minister of Agriculture, and from July 1953 to January 1954 he served as Minister of the Interior in the caretaker government of Giuseppe Pella. As Minister of Labour, he developed the so-called "Fanfani house" program for government-built workers' homes and put 200,000 of Italy's unemployed to work on a reforestation program. As Minister of Agriculture, he set in motion much of the Christian Democrats' land reform program. According to a news report in Time magazine, "He can keep going for 36 hours on catnaps, apples and a few sips of water", and when someone proposed Fanfani for another ministry, De Gasperi refused, stating: "If I keep on appointing Fanfani to various ministries, I am sure that one of these days I will open the door to my study and find Fanfani sitting at my desk."

== Leader of Christian Democracy and prime minister ==
=== First government ===
On 12 January 1954, after 5 months in power, Prime Minister Giuseppe Pella was forced to resign, after a strong confrontation with many members of DC, regarding the appointment of Salvatore Aldisio as new Minister of Agriculture. Fanfani was then appointed by President Luigi Einaudi as new head of the government. Fanfani formed a one-party government composed only by members of the Christian Democracy. He chose, among others, Giulio Andreotti, another protégé of De Gasperi, as Minister of the Interior, Adone Zoli as Minister of Finance and Paolo Emilio Taviani as Minister of Defence.

The cabinet lasted 23 days when it failed to win approval in the Parliament, being rejected by the Chamber of Deputies with 260 votes in favor, 303 votes against and 12 abstentions out of 563 present. On 10 February 1954, Mario Scelba sworn in as new prime minister. Fanfani's first government was the shortest-lived cabinet in the history of the Italian Republic. Since De Gasperi's retirement in 1953 Fanfani emerged as the most probable successor, a role confirmed by his appointment as party secretary in June 1954, a position that he would held until March 1959.

=== Secretary of Christian Democracy ===
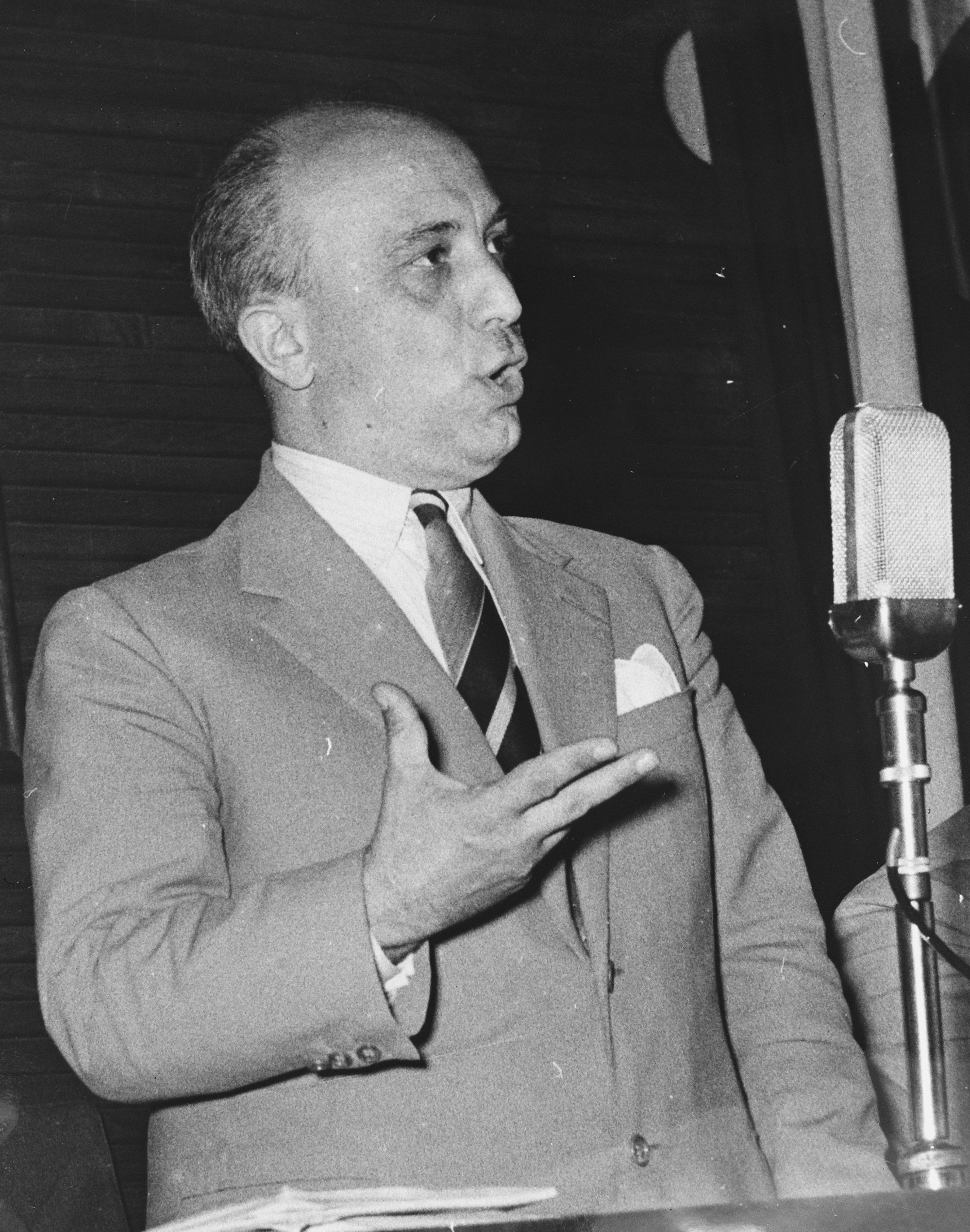
Fanfani during a rally in 1954

As secretary, Fanfani reorganized and rejuvenated the national party organization of the DC, decreasing its strong dependence on the Catholic Church and the national government that had typified the De Gasperi period. During his tenure, he built a close relation with Enrico Mattei, the CEO of Eni. They remained key allies until Mattei's death in October 1962.

Fanani's activist and sometimes authoritarian style, as well as his reputation as an economic reformer, ensured that the moderate and the right-wingers within the DC, who opposed the state's intrusion into the country's economic life, regarded him with distrust. His indefatigable energy and his passion for efficiency carried him far in politics, but he was rarely able to exploit fully the opportunities that he created. As an anonymous Christian Democrat bigwig once remarked: "Fanfani has colleagues, associates, acquaintances and subordinates, but I have never heard much about his friends."

In May 1955, Einaudi's term as president of the Italian Republic came to an end, and Parliament had to choose his successor. Fanfani was promoting for the office the liberal Cesare Merzagora, who was then president of the Senate; however, the right wing of the party, led by Pella and Andreotti, organized an internal coup to get Giovanni Gronchi elected instead. The move received the surprising support of the Italian Communist Party (PCI) and Italian Socialist Party (PSI), as well as the Monarchist National Party (PNM) and the neo-fascist Italian Social Movement (MSI). After a bitter battle and the final crumbling of the centrist front, Gronchi was elected president of the Italian Republic on 29 April 1955, with 658 votes out of 883.

During his secretariat, Fanfani built good relations both with US President Dwight D. Eisenhower and Secretary of State John Foster Dulles, culminated to a state visit to Washington, D.C., in August 1956. The brutal suppression of 1956 Hungarian Revolution saw him coordinating a strong anti-communist propaganda in the country.

=== Second government ===
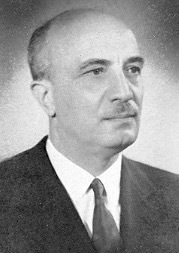
Fanfani as member of the Chamber of Deputies in 1963

In the 1958 Italian general election, Fanfani ran as secretary of the DC and main candidate to become the next prime minister. The electoral result was similar to the one of five years before. The DC gained 42.4% of votes, nearly doubling the results of the Italian Communist Party (PCI) led by Palmiro Togliatti. The poor results of the other small centrist and secular parties meant the continuation of the same problems of political instability within the Italian system of centrism that had characterized the previous legislature.

The DC resulted even more polarized between Fanfani's leftist faction and the opposite one, which urged for a more right-wing policy; Fanfani relaunched his reformist agenda, advocating for a dialogue with the Italian Socialist Party (PSI), which had stopped its ties with the PCI after the Hungarian Revolution. A government between DC and PSI was probably too premature due to the strong opposition of DC's right-wing. On 2 July 1958, Fanfani was sworn in as new prime minister at the head of a coalition government with the more moderate Italian Democratic Socialist Party (PSDI), and a case-by-case support of the Italian Republican Party (PRI).

Fanfani then decided not to resign immediately as secretary of the DC, wanting to bring the party behind him, at least until a new congress. He started an active foreign policy, along the lines of the "neo-Atlantism", implementing a more autonomous foreign policy from the United States, presenting Italy as the main regional power of the Mediterranean Basin, trying to avoid the increase of Soviet Union's sphere of influence over the Arab countries. He failed to leave a mark in domestic politics despite his ambitious proposal of a 10-year plan for the development of public school, which was approved by the Italian Parliament but not implemented. His economic policy was characterized by an increasing public spending.

The unprecedented concentration of power that he had achieved was also the main reason of his second government's decline. The outraged conservative opposition resulted in a progressive breakdown of the internal majority faction, "Democratic Initiative". In January 1959, a conspicuous group of members of the DC started voting against their own government, forcing Fanfani to resign on 26 January 1959 after six months in power. On 16 February 1959, Antonio Segni sworn in as new prime minister. In March 1959, Fanfani resigned as party's secretary, and Aldo Moro became the new leader. After few weeks, he founded a new faction, known as Nuove Cronache ("New Chronicles").

In the party's congress in October 1959, Moro was narrowly confirmed secretary after a thought battle with Fanfani, who was defeated thanks to the decisive vote of the right-wing faction of Scelba and Andreotti. When the Italian Liberal Party (PLI) withdrew its support to Segni's government, Fanfani cooperated with Moro, attempting to establish a new centre-left government, with a case-by-case socialist support. This pact was strongly opposed by ecclesiastical hierarchies as well as the opposition of the DC's right-wing. After Fanfani's failure, Fernando Tambroni was appointed new prime minister. Tambroni, a right-wing conservative, received a decisive vote of confidence by the neo-fascist Italian Social Movement (MSI). The MSI had been banned by any type of political power since its birth under the theory of the "Constitutional Arch", which stated that any government or party which had voted the Italian Constitution, had to refuse any relationship with neo-fascist and monarchist forces, seen as anti-constitutional groups. Strikes and revolts causing some casualties erupted through the country, and Tambroni had to resign within few months. On 26 July 1960, Fanfani returned to the premiership, this time with an openly centre-left programme supported by the PSI abstention.

=== Third and fourth government ===
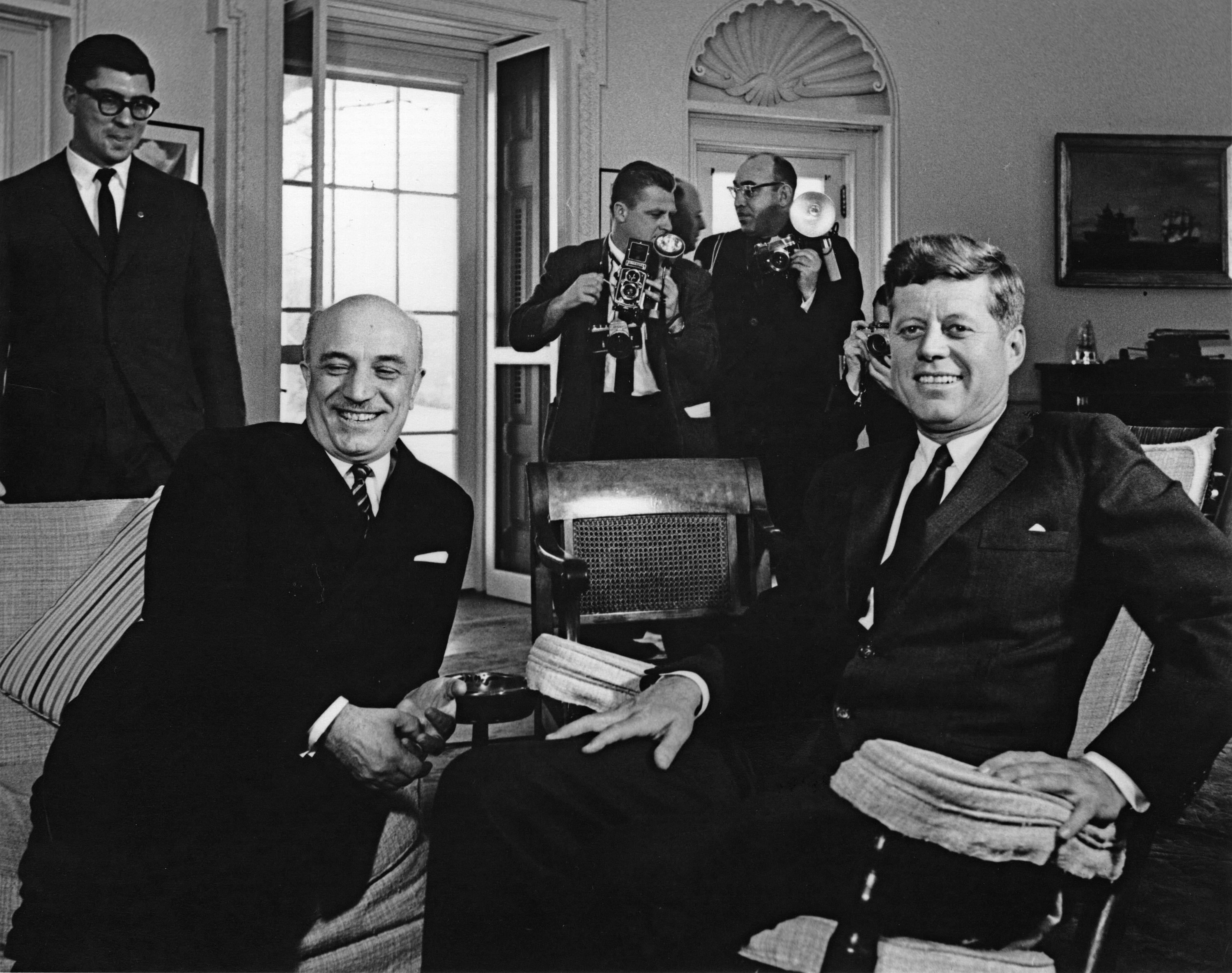
Fanfani with US President John F. Kennedy at the White House in 1963

The third Fanfani government was formed only by DC ministers, and included also members of the party's right-wing, like Andreotti, Pella, Scelba, and Guido Gonella, who served respectively as ministers of Defence, Budget Interior, and Justice. The cabinet was externally supported by PSDI, PRI, and PLI. With Fanfani as prime minister and Moro as secretary of the party, the organic centre-left period officially began. In February 1962, after the national congress of the DC, Fanfani reorganized his cabinet and gained the benign abstention of the socialist leader Pietro Nenni. During this term as prime minister, Fanfani carried out a number of reforms in areas such as health, education, and social security.

In his three years rule, thanks to the key support of the PSI, Fanfani approved the nationalization of Enel, the national electric company and the establishment of middle school, the introduction of share taxation. Only the implementation of the ordinary statute Italian regions and the urban reform remained uncompleted due to a strong internal opposition within the DC. Moreover, the new international balance of power marked by the presidency of John F. Kennedy, influenced Western politics in favor of reformism, as the best alternative to defeat Soviet Communism. During his premiership, Fanfani built up a good relation with President Kennedy. The two leaders met the first time during 1956 Democratic National Convention in Chicago, and in 1963 was invited at the White House. Some analysts reported that Kennedy considered Fanfani an example of Catholic reformism. According to Ettore Bernabei, during the Cuban Missile Crisis it was Fanfani who proposed the withdrawal of medium-range US missiles from Apulia, which than resulted in a peaceful ending of the crisis.

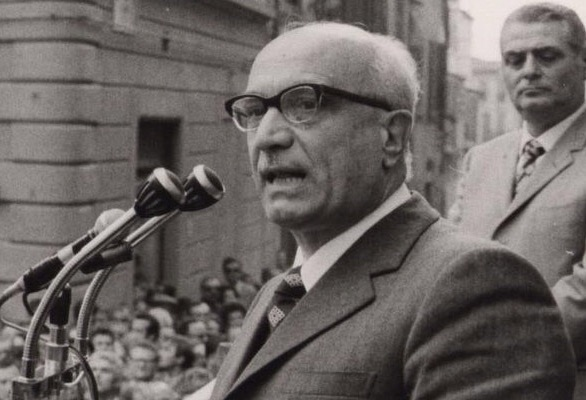
Fanfani during a Christian Democracy rally in the late 1960s

Despite a good approval in public opinion, his reformist policy produced a significant mistrust of the Italian industrial class and the right wing of the DC; multinational potentates opposed the opening to the Arab countries led by Fanfani's ally Enrico Mattei, founder of Eni. In the 1963 Italian general election, the DC lost almost one million votes, gaining nearly 38%, while the PCI arrived second with 25%. The PLI surged to 7%, the party's best result, receiving many votes from former DC supporters who were against Fanfani's centre-left policies. With the decline of electoral support, on 22 June 1963 the majority of DC members decided to replace Fanfani with a provisional government led by the Chamber of Deputies impartial president Giovanni Leone; however, when the party congress of the PSI in autumn authorized a full engagement of the party into the government, Leone resigned and Moro, secretary of the DC and leader of the more leftist wing of the party, became the new prime minister and ruled Italy for more than four years.

== Minister and president of the Senate ==
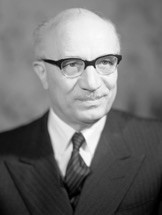
Fanfani during the 1970s

In August 1964, President Segni suffered a serious cerebral hemorrhage while he was working at the presidential palace; he only partially recovered and decided to resign. Fanfani tried to be elected president, running against Leone as the DC's official candidate. Neither Fanfani nor Leone succeeded in being elected, and instead the 1964 Italian presidential election was won by the social-democratic leader Giuseppe Saragat of the PSDI, who succeeded in gaining the majority of votes.

Fanfani's reckless action against Leone caused him even more enmities. In March 1965, Fanfani was appointed Minister of Foreign Affairs during the second Moro government. In December 1965, he was forced to resign after the publication of an unauthorized interview, in which he harshly criticized the government and the United States. After two months, he returned to the office in the third Moro government. During his ministry, he implemented a strong pro-European politics, advocating a strengthen of the European Economic Community (EEC). Moreover, he was a vocal opponent of US bombing on civilians during the Vietnam War. Fanfani also continued implementing his pro-Arab policies in the Mediterranean Sea, and tried to build a closer relation with the People's Republic of China. From 1965 to 1966, he also served as president of the United Nations General Assembly, becoming the only Italian to have held this office.

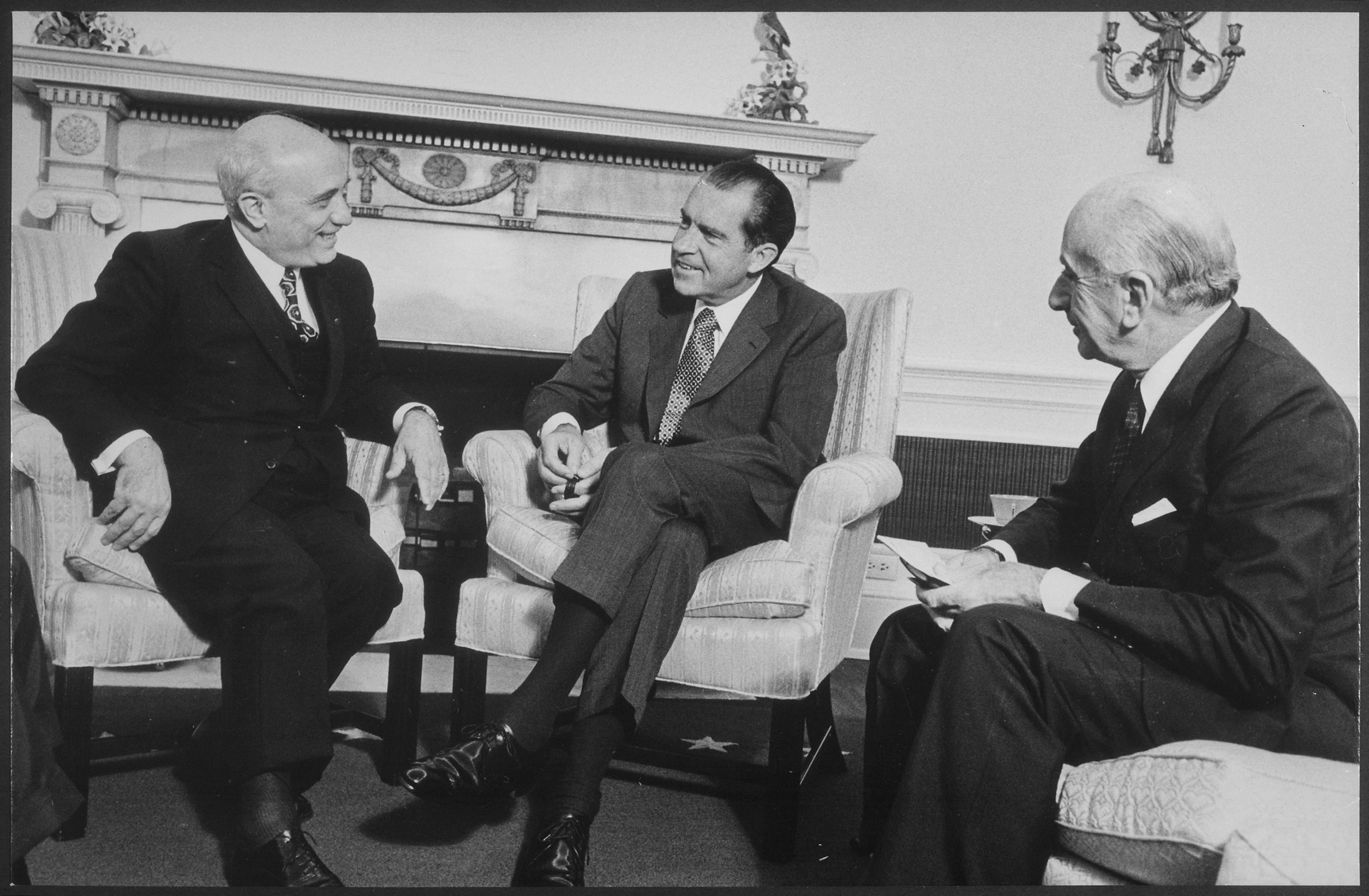
Fanfani with US President Richard Nixon in 1970

In the 1968 Italian general election, Fanfani ran for the Senate of the Republic, being elected in the constituency of Arezzo with 41,070 votes. On 5 June 1968, he was elected president of the Senate and remained in office until 26 June 1973. On 26 September 1968, Fanfani lost his wife, Biancarosa, who died of cerebral venous thrombosis at 54-year-old. In March 1970, after the fall of Mariano Rumor's second government, President Saragat gave Fanfani the task of forming a new centre-left government, but his proposal to bring in the cabinet all the parties' secretaries was not accepted because it was seen as an excessive way to strengthen the government in contrast to the particracy that dominated Italian politics. On 27 March 1970, Rumor was sworn in as prime minister again.

In the 1971 Italian presidential election, Fanfani was proposed as the DC candidate for president of the Italian Republic. Once again the move failed, being weakened by the divisions within his own party and the PSI candidacy of Francesco De Martino, who received votes from the PCI, PSI, and some PSDI members. Fanfani retired after several unsuccessful ballots; at the twenty-third round, Leone, who was Fanfani's rival in the 1964 election, was elected with the necessary majority. On 10 March 1972, Leone appointed Fanfani senator for life.

=== Second term as secretary ===
In June 1973 Fanfani was elected secretary of the DC for a second term, replacing his former protégé Arnaldo Forlani, who was now a supporter of centrist policies. As such, he led the campaign for the 1974 Italian divorce referendum on repealing the law allowing divorce, which was approved by Parliament in 1970. Those voting "yes" wanted to outlaw divorce as had been the case before the law came into effect, and those voting "no" wanted to retain the law and their newly gained right to divorce. The voting method caused significant confusion with many people not understanding that they had to vote "no" to be able to divorce or vote "yes" to outlaw divorce.

The DC and the neo-fascist MSI intensely campaigned for a "yes" vote to abolish the law and make divorce illegal again. Their main themes were the safeguarding of the traditional nuclear family model and the Roman Catechism, while most left-wing political forces, including PCI and PSI, supported the "no" faction. Fanfani thought that a "no" victory could have given him the control of in his own party again; in fact, other key figures like Moro, Rumor, Emilio Colombo, and Francesco Cossiga, who believed in the defeat at the referendum, kept a low profile during the campaign.

Despite Fanfani's activism, the "no" front was defeated by margin of 59.3% to 40.7% on a voter turnout of 87.7%, thus allowing the divorce laws to remain in force. The soundly defeat in the divorce referendum forced his resignation as party secretary in July 1975. The new secretary of the party was Benigno Zaccagnini, a Christian leftist who was initially supported by Fanfani. After his ideas of starting a cooperation with the PCI, Fanfani, Andreotti, and Flaminio Piccoli tried to force Zaccagnini to resignation but failed.

On 3 August 1975, Fanfani married his second wife, Mariapia Vecchi (née Tavazzani), a widow and strong-willed woman engaged in multiple voluntary activities, nationally and internationally. On 5 July 1976, Fanfani was elected president of the Senate for a second term, a position that he held until 1 December 1982. In that new political phase he had to significantly reduce his ambitions of holding an active political role, acting like sober and low-profile statesman. On 30 July 1976, Moro reached an agreement with the PCI leader Enrico Berlinguer to start a government composed only by the DC but with the abstention of the PCI. The cabinet, who was led by Andreotti, was nicknamed "government of the non-no-confidence".

=== Kidnapping of Aldo Moro ===
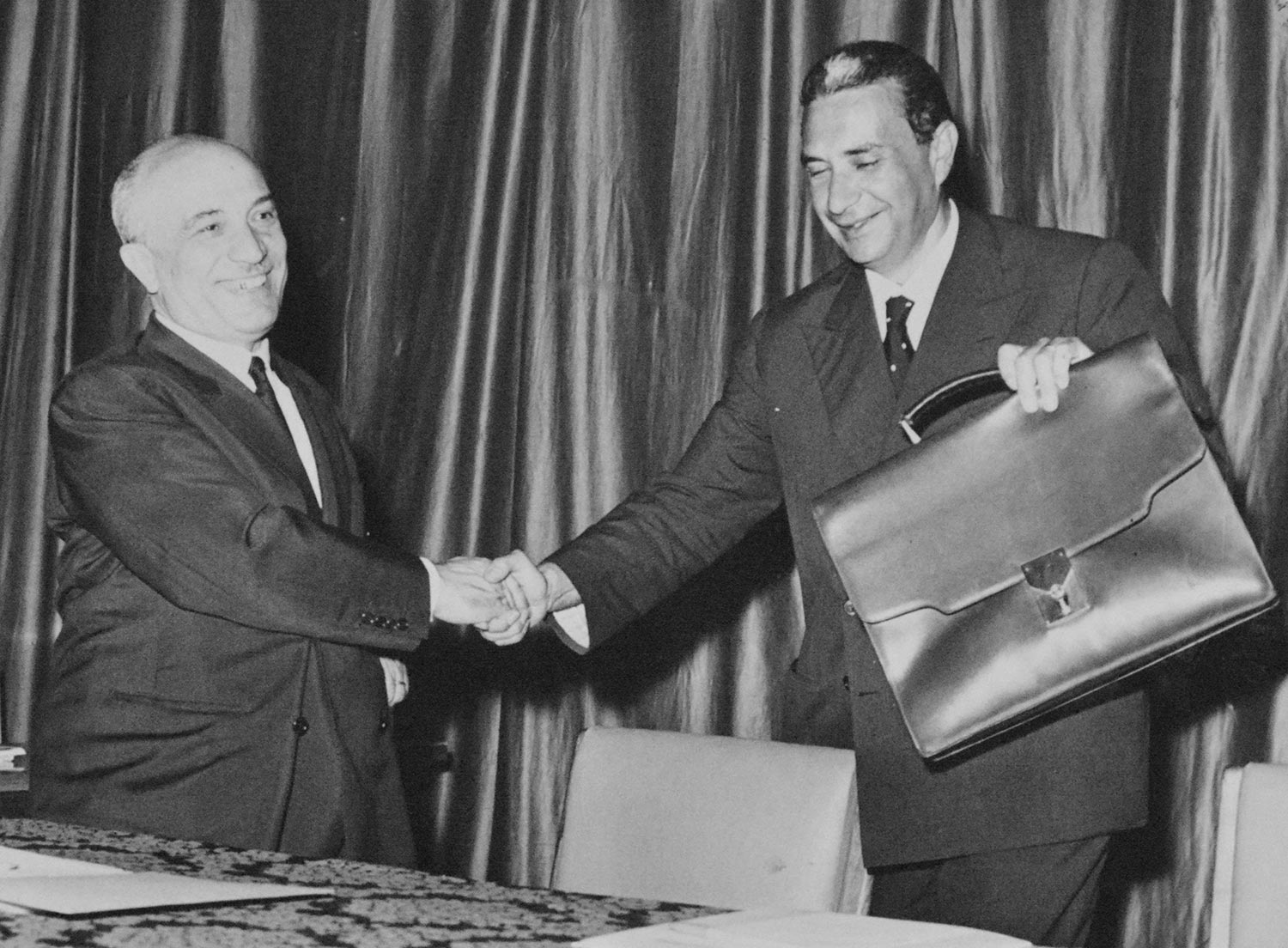
Fanfani and Moro during the 1970s

In January 1978, Andreotti's government fell due to the withdrawal of support from the PCI, which wanted to be directly involved in the government, an hypothesis rejected by the DC. In March 1978, the political crisis was overcome by the intervention of Moro, who proposed a new cabinet, again formed only by DC members but with positive confidence votes from the other parties, including Berlinguer's PCI. This cabinet was formed on 16 March 1978, the day of the kidnapping and murder of Moro by the left-wing terrorist group known as Red Brigades (BR). The dramatic situation that followed brought PCI to vote in favour of the fourth Andreotti government for the sake of what was called "national solidarity", despite its refusal to accept several previous requests. During the kidnapping of his long-time friend but also rival, despite Andreotti and Cossiga's positions, Fanfani did not refuse every possibility of negotiations with the terrorists. Moro was killed by the BR in May 1978. Fanfani was the only DC leader to be allowed by Moro's family to participate to the funeral.

== Last terms as prime minister ==
Fanfani with the other G7 leaders in Virginia, 1983

In June 1981, Giovanni Spadolini, a member of the PRI, was appointed prime minister, becoming the first non-DC member to hold the office since the foundation of the Italian Republic. In November 1982, Spadolini was forced to resign due to the "godmothers' quarrel", a political conflict between ministers Beniamino Andreatta and Rino Formica about the separation between Ministry of Treasury and Bank of Italy. Fanfani, who was still serving as president of the Senate, received the task from President Sandro Pertini of forming a new government and sworn in on 1 December 1982. The cabinet was composed by members of DC, PSI, PSDI, and PLI. Fanfani resigned on 29 April 1983. After months of tense relations in the majority, the central committee of the PSI, meeting on 22 April, decided the withdrew its support to the government, calling for new elections.

The 1983 Italian general election resulted in a big loss for DC and its new secretary, Ciriaco De Mita. The DC lost more than five percentage points from the previous election, while the PSI gained ground. On 4 August 1983, the PSI leader Bettino Craxi succeeded Fanfani at the head of the government. De Mita accused Fanfani for the electoral defeat and did not candidate him as president of the Senate, preferring Francesco Cossiga. After this fact, it was even clearer how Fanfani had by then lost much of his political power and control over the party. In the 1985 Italian presidential election, Cossiga was elected as president with 752 votes out of 977. His candidacy was endorsed by the DC but supported also by the PCI, PSI, PSDI, PLI, and PRI. This was the first time an Italian presidential candidate had won the election on the first ballot where a two-thirds majority is necessary. On 9 July 1985, Fanfani was re-elected president of the Senate for a third term.

In April 1987, De Mita decided to drop his support for the second Craxi's government. This caused the immediate fall of the cabinet and the formation of a new government led again by Fanfani. Even though he was a close friend of Craxi, the PSI leader did not participate in the swearing in ceremony, sending Giuliano Amato, the then undersecretary of the Council of Ministers to protest against De Mita's decision. The sixth Fanfani government, composed only of DC ministers with some independent ministers, did not gain the confidence in the Chamber of Deputies following a surreal vote when it gained the confidence from the PSI, PSDI and Radical Party (PR) that were excluded from the government, while the DC abstained. Fanfani presented his resignation after 11 days as head of government, causing the early dissolution of the houses of Parliament. He would remain in office until 29 July 1987. After the 1987 Italian general election, a new government was formed with Giovanni Goria at its head.

== After the premiership ==
In Goria's cabinet, Fanfani was appointed Minister of the Interior. The government fell in April 1988 after the PSI withdrew its support in opposition to the reopening of the Montalto di Castro nuclear power plant, decided by the government. De Mita became the new prime minister and Fanfani held the office of Minister of Budget and Economic Planning. Tensions between the DC and the PSI and continued growing and De Mita was forced to resign in July 1989. In 1992, Fanfani was elected to the prestigious office of chairman of the Foreign Affairs Committee of the Senate and held the role until 1994. In January 1994, he supported the dissolution of the DC, which had been overwhelmed by Tangentopoli corruption scandal, and the formation of the Italian People's Party (PPI).

== Death and legacy ==
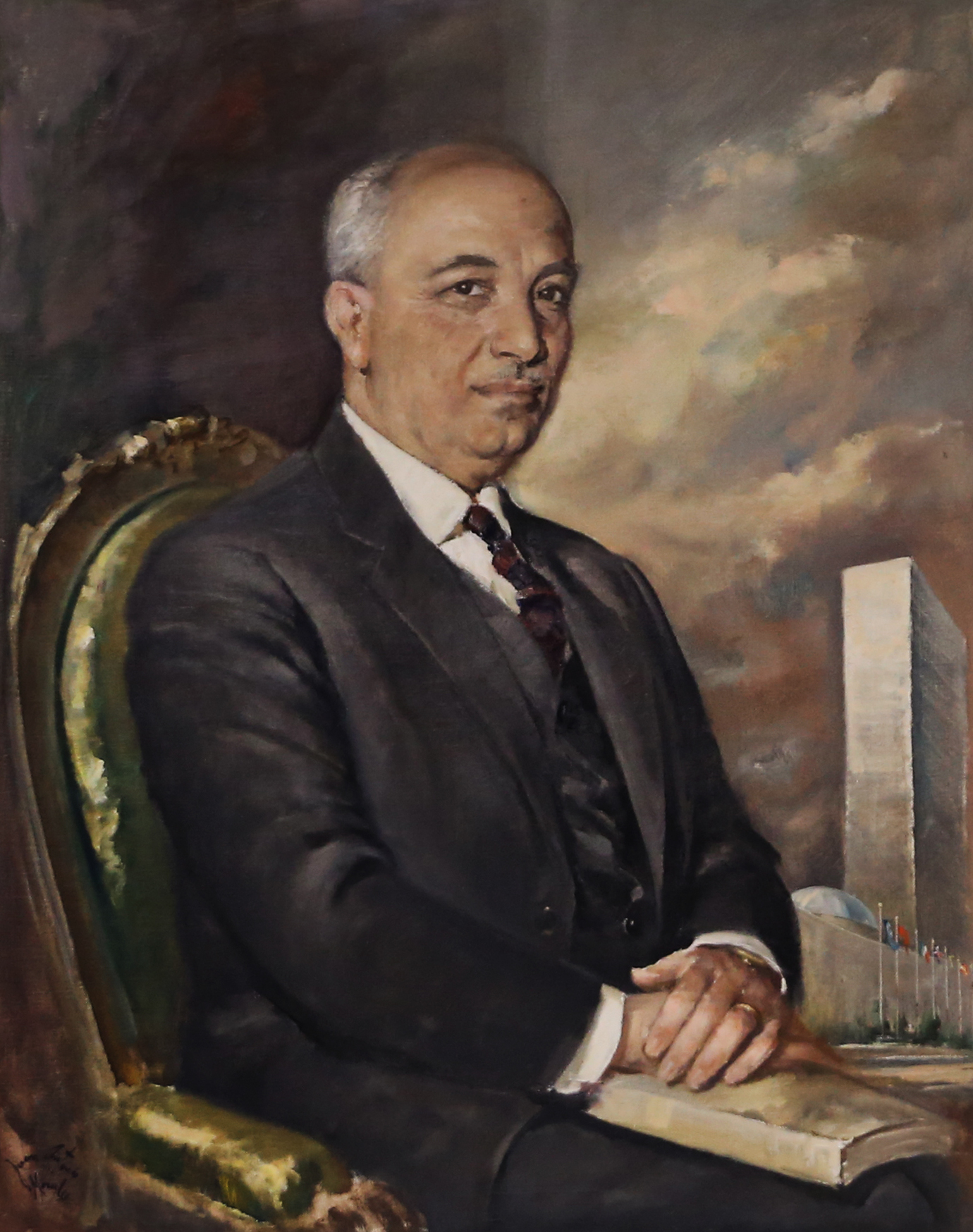
A portrait of Fanfani as president of the UN General Assembly

Fanfani died in Rome on 20 November 1999, at the age 91. Fanfani is still a controversial figure in Italian politics. Admirers emphasize his reformist agenda and his ambition to cooperate with socialists, laying the groundwork for the birth of the modern Italian centre-left, of which he is widely considered one of the main founding fathers. Critics condemn his centralized and often authoritarian political style, which was probably the main reason for his decline. He had always believed in corporatism, considering Italian fascism only as a "temporary aberration" of corporatism. He never tried to hide his fascist past; unlike many Italians, he freely admitted that he was wrong.

Fanfani held all positions and offices that a politician could possibly aspire to, except the one he craved most, the presidency of the Italian Republic. His authoritarian nature and factionalism within the DC turned out to be the biggest obstacles to the emergence of Fanfanism, the Italian version of Gaullism, and one by one he lost all his offices. In an obituary for La Stampa, journalist Filippo Ceccarelli reflected that Fanfani's commitment to public service inspired the values of the public broadcaster RAI, which matured during his political career.

== Electoral history ==
Election	House	Constituency	Party	Votes	Result
1946	Constituent Assembly	Siena–Arezzo–Grosseto	DC	15,692	Elected
1948	Chamber of Deputies	Siena–Arezzo–Grosseto	DC	35,515	Elected
1953	Chamber of Deputies	Siena–Arezzo–Grosseto	DC	44,816	Elected
1958	Chamber of Deputies	Siena–Arezzo–Grosseto	DC	45,956	Elected
1963	Chamber of Deputies	Siena–Arezzo–Grosseto	DC	58,791	Elected
1968	Senate of the Republic	Arezzo	DC	41,070	Elected

Political offices
Preceded by Giuseppe Romita	Minister of Labour; 1947–1950	Succeeded by Achille Marazza
Preceded by Antonio Segni	Minister of Agriculture; 1951–1953	Succeeded by Rocco Salomone
Preceded by Mario Scelba	Minister of the Interior; 1953–1954	Succeeded by Giulio Andreotti
Preceded by Giuseppe Pella	Prime Minister of Italy; 1954	Succeeded by Mario Scelba
Preceded by Adone Zoli	Prime Minister of Italy; 1958–1959	Succeeded by Antonio Segni
Preceded by Giuseppe Pella	Minister of Foreign Affairs; 1958–1959	Succeeded by Giuseppe Pella
Preceded by Fernando Tambroni	Prime Minister of Italy; 1960–1963	Succeeded by Giovanni Leone
Preceded by Antonio Segni	Minister of Foreign Affairs; Acting; 1962	Succeeded by Attilio Piccioni
Preceded by Aldo Moro; Acting	Minister of Foreign Affairs; 1965	Succeeded by Aldo Moro; Acting
Preceded by Aldo Moro; Acting	Minister of Foreign Affairs; 1966–1968	Succeeded by Giuseppe Medici
Preceded by Ennio Zelioli-Lanzini	President of the Senate of the Republic; 1968–1973	Succeeded by Giovanni Spagnolli
Preceded by Giovanni Spagnolli	President of the Senate of the Republic; 1976–1982	Succeeded by Tommaso Morlino
Preceded by Giovanni Leone	President of Italy; Acting; 1978	Succeeded by Sandro Pertini
Preceded by Giovanni Spadolini	Prime Minister of Italy; 1982–1983	Succeeded by Bettino Craxi
Preceded by Francesco Cossiga	President of the Senate of the Republic; 1985–1987	Succeeded by Giovanni Malagodi
Preceded by Bettino Craxi	Prime Minister of Italy; 1987	Succeeded by Giovanni Goria
Preceded by Oscar Luigi Scalfaro	Minister of the Interior; 1987–1988	Succeeded by Antonio Gava
Preceded by Emilio Colombo	Minister of the Budget; 1988–1989	Succeeded by Paolo Cirino Pomicino
Party political offices
Preceded by Alcide De Gasperi	Secretary of Christian Democracy; 1954–1959	Succeeded by Aldo Moro
Preceded by Arnaldo Forlani	Secretary of Christian Democracy; 1973–1975	Succeeded by Benigno Zaccagnini
Diplomatic posts
Preceded by Alex Quaison-Sackey	President of the UN General Assembly; 1965–1966	Succeeded by Abdul Rahman Pazhwak
Preceded by Yasuhiro Nakasone	Chairperson of the G7; 1987	Succeeded by Brian Mulroney
