= Colombo government =

26th government of the Italian Republic

Colombo Cabinet
- 26th Cabinet of Italy

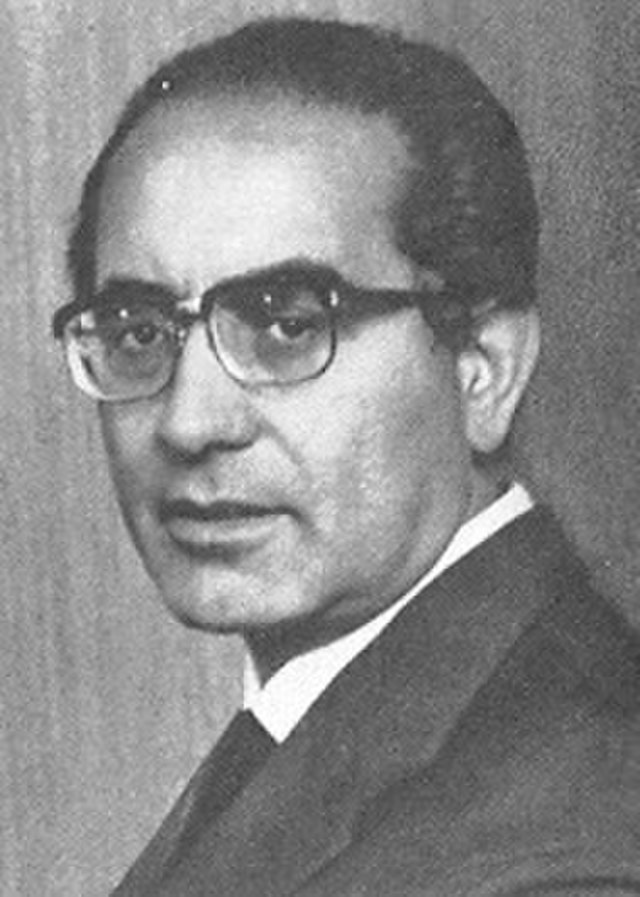
- Date formed: 6 August 1970
- Date dissolved: 18 February 1972

People and organisations
- Head of state: Giuseppe Saragat; Giovanni Leone
- Head of government: Emilio Colombo
- Member parties: DC, PSI, PSDI, PRI
- Status in legislature: Coalition government Organic Centre-left
- Opposition parties: PCI, PLI, MSI, PSIUP, PDIUM

History
- Legislature term: V Legislature (1968–1972)
- Predecessor: Rumor III Cabinet
- Successor: Andreotti I Cabinet

The Colombo Cabinet was the 26th cabinet of the Italian Republic. It held office from 6 August 1970 to 18 February 1972, for a total of 561 days (1 year, 6 months and 12 days).

Colombo resigned on 15 January 1972, following the withdrawal of support from the PRI, which was contrary to the government's economic policy.

== Party breakdown ==
- Christian Democracy (DC): prime minister, 15 ministers, 33 undersecretaries
- Italian Socialist Party (PSI): deputy prime minister, 5 ministers, 14 undersecretaries
- Italian Democratic Socialist Party (PSDI): 4 ministers, 9 undersecretaries
- Italian Republican Party (PRI): 1 minister, 2 undersecretaries

== Composition ==
Portfolio	Minister	Took office	Left office	Party
Prime Minister	Emilio Colombo	6 August 1970	18 February 1972	DC
Deputy Prime Minister	Francesco De Martino	6 August 1970	18 February 1972	PSI
Minister of Foreign Affairs	Aldo Moro	6 August 1970	18 February 1972	DC
Minister of the Interior	Franco Restivo	6 August 1970	18 February 1972	DC
Minister of Grace and Justice	Oronzo Reale	6 August 1970	1 March 1971	PRI
Minister of Grace and Justice	Emilio Colombo (ad interim)	1 March 1971	18 February 1972	DC
Minister of Budget and Economic Planning	Antonio Giolitti	6 August 1970	18 February 1972	PSI
Minister of Finance	Luigi Preti	6 August 1970	18 February 1972	PSDI
Minister of Treasury	Mario Ferrari Aggradi	6 August 1970	18 February 1972	DC
Minister of Defence	Mario Tanassi	6 August 1970	18 February 1972	PSDI
Minister of Public Education	Riccardo Misasi	6 August 1970	18 February 1972	DC
Minister of Public Works	Salvatore Lauricella	6 August 1970	18 February 1972	PSI
Minister of Agriculture and Forests	Lorenzo Natali	6 August 1970	18 February 1972	DC
Minister of Transport and Civil Aviation	Italo Viglianesi	6 August 1970	18 February 1972	PSI
Minister of Post and Telecommunications	Giacinto Bosco	6 August 1970	18 February 1972	DC
Minister of Industry, Commerce and Craftsmanship	Silvio Gava	6 August 1970	18 February 1972	DC
Minister of Health	Luigi Mariotti	6 August 1970	18 February 1972	PSI
Minister of Foreign Trade	Mario Zagari	6 August 1970	18 February 1972	PSI
Minister of Merchant Navy	Salvatore Mannironi	6 August 1970	6 April 1971	DC
Minister of Merchant Navy	Salvatore Mannironi	10 April 1971	18 February 1972	DC
Minister of State Holdings	Flaminio Piccoli	6 August 1970	18 February 1972	DC
Minister of Labour and Social Security	Carlo Donat-Cattin	6 August 1970	18 February 1972	DC
Minister of Tourism and Entertainment	Gianmatteo Matteotti	6 August 1970	18 February 1972	PSDI
Minister for Particular Political and Coordination Tasks (Note: with special regard to the Presidency of the Italian delegation to the UN) (without portfolio)	Giuseppe Lupis	6 August 1970	18 February 1972	PSDI
Minister for Extraordinary Interventions in the South (without portfolio)	Paolo Emilio Taviani	6 August 1970	18 February 1972	DC
Minister for the Problems Related to the Implementation of the Regions (without portfolio)	Eugenio Gatto	6 August 1970	18 February 1972	DC
Minister for Parliamentary Relations (without portfolio)	Carlo Russo	6 August 1970	18 February 1972	DC
Minister for Scientific Research (without portfolio)	Camillo Ripamonti	6 August 1970	18 February 1972	DC
Minister for Public Administration Reform (without portfolio)	Remo Gaspari	6 August 1970	18 February 1972	DC
Secretary of the Council of Ministers	Dario Antoniozzi	6 August 1970	18 February 1972	DC
