= First Rumor government =

23rd government of the Italian Republic

Rumor I Cabinet
- 23rd Cabinet of Italy

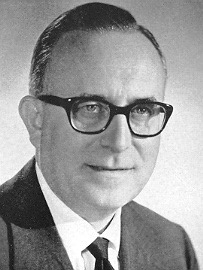
- Date formed: 13 December 1968
- Date dissolved: 6 August 1969

People and organisations
- Head of state: Giuseppe Saragat
- Head of government: Mariano Rumor
- Member parties: DC, PSI, PRI
- Status in legislature: Coalition government

History
- Legislature term: V Legislature (1968–1972)
- Predecessor: Leone II Cabinet
- Successor: Rumor II Cabinet

The Rumor I Cabinet was the 23rd cabinet of the Italian Republic.

The government fell in July 1969 following the splitting of the Unitary Socialist Party from the PSI.

== Party breakdown ==
- Christian Democracy (DC): prime minister, 16 ministers, 32 undersecretaries
- Italian Socialist Party (PSI): deputy prime minister, 8 ministers, 22 undersecretaries
- Italian Republican Party (PRI): 1 minister, 2 undersecretaries

== Composition ==
Portfolio	Minister	Took office	Left office	Party
Prime Minister	Mariano Rumor	13 December 1968	6 August 1969	DC
Deputy Prime Minister	Francesco De Martino	13 December 1968	6 August 1969	PSI
Minister of Foreign Affairs	Pietro Nenni	13 December 1968	6 August 1969	PSI
Minister of the Interior	Franco Restivo	13 December 1968	6 August 1969	DC
Minister of Grace and Justice	Silvio Gava	13 December 1968	6 August 1969	DC
Minister of Budget and Economic Planning	Luigi Preti	13 December 1968	6 August 1969	PSI
Minister of Finance	Oronzo Reale	13 December 1968	6 August 1969	PRI
Minister of Treasury	Emilio Colombo	13 December 1968	6 August 1969	DC
Minister of Defence	Luigi Gui	13 December 1968	6 August 1969	DC
Minister of Public Education	Fiorentino Sullo	13 December 1968	24 March 1969	DC
Minister of Public Education	Mario Ferrari Aggradi	24 March 1969	6 August 1969	DC
Minister of Public Works	Giacomo Mancini	13 December 1968	6 August 1969	PSI
Minister of Agriculture and Forests	Athos Valsecchi	13 December 1968	6 August 1969	DC
Minister of Transport and Civil Aviation	Luigi Mariotti	13 December 1968	6 August 1969	PSI
Minister of Post and Telecommunications	Mario Ferrari Aggradi	13 December 1968	24 March 1969	DC
Minister of Post and Telecommunications	Crescenzo Mazza	24 March 1969	6 August 1969	DC
Minister of Industry, Commerce and Craftsmanship	Mario Tanassi	13 December 1968	6 August 1969	PSI
Minister of Health	Camillo Ripamonti	13 December 1968	6 August 1969	DC
Minister of Foreign Trade	Vittorino Colombo	13 December 1968	6 August 1969	DC
Minister of Merchant Navy	Giuseppe Lupis	13 December 1968	6 August 1969	PSI
Minister of State Holdings	Arnaldo Forlani	13 December 1968	6 August 1969	DC
Minister of Labour and Social Security	Giacomo Brodolini	13 December 1968	6 August 1969	PSI
Minister of Tourism and Entertainment	Lorenzo Natali	13 December 1968	6 August 1969	DC
Minister for Extraordinary Interventions in the South and in the depressive areas of the Center-North (without portfolio)	Paolo Emilio Taviani	13 December 1968	6 August 1969	DC
Minister for Particular Political Tasks (without portfolio)	Crescenzo Mazza	13 December 1968	6 August 1969	DC
Minister for Parliamentary Relations (without portfolio)	Carlo Russo	13 December 1968	6 August 1969	DC
Minister for Scientific Research (without portfolio)	Salvatore Lauricella	13 December 1968	6 August 1969	PSI
Minister for Public Administration Reform (without portfolio)	Eugenio Gatto	13 December 1968	6 August 1969	DC
Minister for Special Assignments (without portfolio)	Giacinto Bosco	13 December 1968	6 August 1969	DC
Secretary of the Council of Ministers	Antonio Bisaglia	13 December 1968	6 August 1969	DC
