= Second Rumor government =

24th government of the Italian Republic

Rumor II Cabinet
- 24th Cabinet of Italy

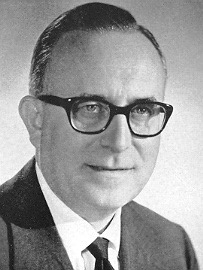
- Date formed: 6 August 1969
- Date dissolved: 28 March 1970

People and organisations
- Head of state: Giuseppe Saragat
- Head of government: Mariano Rumor
- Member parties: DC
- Status in legislature: One-party government

History
- Legislature term: V Legislature (1968–1972)
- Predecessor: Rumor I Cabinet
- Successor: Rumor III Cabinet

The Rumor II Cabinet was the 24th cabinet of the Italian Republic. It held office from 5 August 1969 until 27 March 1970, for a total of 234 days, or 7 months and 22 days.

== Composition ==
Cabinet members
Portfolio	Minister	Took office	Left office	Party
Prime Minister	Mariano Rumor	6 August 1969	28 March 1970	DC
Deputy Prime Minister	Paolo Emilio Taviani	6 August 1969	28 March 1970	DC
Minister of Foreign Affairs	Aldo Moro	6 August 1969	28 March 1970	DC
Minister of the Interior	Franco Restivo	6 August 1969	28 March 1970	DC
Minister of Grace and Justice	Silvio Gava	6 August 1969	28 March 1970	DC
Minister of Budget and Economic Planning	Giuseppe Caron	6 August 1969	28 March 1970	DC
Minister of Finance	Giacinto Bosco	6 August 1969	28 March 1970	DC
Minister of Treasury	Emilio Colombo	6 August 1969	28 March 1970	DC
Minister of Defence	Luigi Gui	6 August 1969	28 March 1970	DC
Minister of Public Education	Mario Ferrari Aggradi	6 August 1969	28 March 1970	DC
Minister of Public Works	Lorenzo Natali	6 August 1969	28 March 1970	DC
Minister of Agriculture and Forests	Giacomo Sedati	6 August 1969	28 March 1970	DC
Minister of Transport and Civil Aviation	Remo Gaspari	6 August 1969	28 March 1970	DC
Minister of Post and Telecommunications	Athos Valsecchi	6 August 1969	28 March 1970	DC
Minister of Industry, Commerce and Craftsmanship	Domenico Magrì	6 August 1969	28 March 1970	DC
Minister of Health	Camillo Ripamonti	6 August 1969	28 March 1970	DC
Minister of Foreign Trade	Riccardo Misasi	6 August 1969	28 March 1970	DC
Minister of Merchant Navy	Vittorino Colombo	6 August 1969	28 March 1970	DC
Minister of State Holdings	Franco Maria Malfatti	6 August 1969	28 March 1970	DC
Minister of Labour and Social Security	Carlo Donat-Cattin	6 August 1969	28 March 1970	DC
Minister of Tourism and Entertainment	Giovanni Battista Scaglia	6 August 1969	28 March 1970	DC
Minister for Parliamentary Relations (without portfolio)	Carlo Russo	6 August 1969	28 March 1970	DC
Minister for Relations with the UN (without portfolio)	Arnaldo Forlani	6 August 1969	28 March 1970	DC
Minister for Scientific Research (without portfolio)	Giorgio Bo	6 August 1969	28 March 1970	DC
Minister for Public Administration Reform (without portfolio)	Eugenio Gatto	6 August 1969	28 March 1970	DC
Secretary of the Council of Ministers	Antonio Bisaglia	6 August 1969	28 March 1970	DC
