= Fifth Rumor government =

30th government of the Italian Republic

Rumor V Cabinet
- 30th Cabinet of Italy

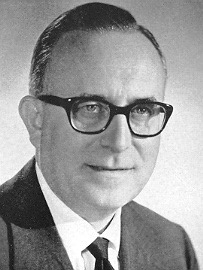
- Date formed: 15 March 1974
- Date dissolved: 23 November 1974

People and organisations
- Head of state: Giovanni Leone
- Head of government: Mariano Rumor
- Member parties: DC, PSI, PSDI
- Status in legislature: Coalition government

History
- Legislature term: VI Legislature (1972–1976)
- Predecessor: Rumor IV Cabinet
- Successor: Moro IV Cabinet

The Rumor V Cabinet was the 30th cabinet of the Italian Republic. It held office from 14 March 1974 to 23 November 1974, for a total of 254 days (8 months and 9 days).

== Party breakdown ==
- Christian Democracy (DC): Prime minister, 15 ministers, 22 undersecretaries
- Italian Socialist Party (PSI): 6 ministers, 12 undersecretaries
- Italian Democratic Socialist Party (PSDI): 4 ministers, 8 undersecretaries

== Composition ==
Portfolio	Minister	Took office	Left office	Party
Prime Minister	Mariano Rumor	14 March 1974	23 November 1974	DC
Minister of Foreign Affairs	Aldo Moro	14 March 1974	23 November 1974	DC
Minister of the Interior	Paolo Emilio Taviani	14 March 1974	23 November 1974	DC
Minister of Grace and Justice	Mario Zagari	14 March 1974	23 November 1974	PSI
Minister of Budget and Economic Planning	Antonio Giolitti	14 March 1974	23 November 1974	PSI
Minister of Finance	Mario Tanassi	14 March 1974	23 November 1974	PSDI
Minister of Treasury	Emilio Colombo	14 March 1974	23 November 1974	DC
Minister of Defence	Giulio Andreotti	14 March 1974	23 November 1974	DC
Minister of Public Education	Franco Maria Malfatti	14 March 1974	23 November 1974	DC
Minister of Public Works	Salvatore Lauricella	14 March 1974	23 November 1974	PSI
Minister of Agriculture and Forests	Antonio Bisaglia	14 March 1974	23 November 1974	DC
Minister of Transport and Civil Aviation	Luigi Preti	14 March 1974	23 November 1974	PSDI
Minister of Post and Telecommunications	Giuseppe Togni	14 March 1974	23 November 1974	DC
Minister of Industry, Commerce and Craftsmanship	Ciriaco De Mita	14 March 1974	23 November 1974	DC
Minister of Health	Vittorino Colombo	14 March 1974	23 November 1974	DC
Minister of Foreign Trade	Gianmatteo Matteotti	14 March 1974	23 November 1974	PSDI
Minister of Merchant Navy	Dionigi Coppo	14 March 1974	23 November 1974	DC
Minister of State Holdings	Antonino Pietro Gullotti	14 March 1974	23 November 1974	DC
Minister of Labour and Social Security	Luigi Bertoldi	14 March 1974	23 November 1974	PSI
Minister of Tourism and Entertainment	Camillo Ripamonti	14 March 1974	23 November 1974	DC
Minister of Cultural Heritage and of Environment (without portfolio)	Giuseppe Lupis	14 March 1974	23 November 1974	PSDI
Minister for the Coordination of Scientific and Technological Research Initiatives (without portfolio)	Giovanni Pieraccini	14 March 1974	23 November 1974	PSI
Minister for the Organization of Public Administration (without portfolio)	Luigi Gui	14 March 1974	23 November 1974	DC
Minister for Extraordinary Interventions in the South (without portfolio)	Giacomo Mancini	14 March 1974	23 November 1974	PSI
Minister for the Problems Related to the Regions (without portfolio)	Mario Toros	14 March 1974	23 November 1974	DC
Minister for Parliamentary Relations (without portfolio)	Giovanni Gioia	14 March 1974	23 November 1974	DC
Secretary of the Council of Ministers	Adolfo Sarti	14 March 1974	23 November 1974	DC
