= Third Rumor government =

25th government of the Italian Republic

Rumor III Cabinet
- 25th Cabinet of Italy

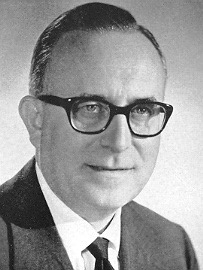
- Date formed: 28 March 1970
- Date dissolved: 6 August 1970

People and organisations
- Head of state: Giuseppe Saragat
- Head of government: Mariano Rumor
- Member parties: DC, PSI, PSDI, PRI
- Status in legislature: Coalition government

History
- Legislature term: V Legislature (1968–1972)
- Predecessor: Rumor II Cabinet
- Successor: Colombo Cabinet

The Rumor III Cabinet was the 25th cabinet of the Italian Republic.

== Party breakdown ==
- Christian Democracy (DC): prime minister, 16 ministers, 33 undersecretaries
- Italian Socialist Party (PSI): deputy prime minister, 5 ministers, 13 undersecretaries
- Italian Democratic Socialist Party (PSDI): 3 ministers, 8 undersecretaries
- Italian Republican Party (PRI): 1 minister, 2 undersecretaries

== Composition ==
Portfolio	Minister	Took office	Left office	Party
Prime Minister	Mariano Rumor	28 March 1970	6 August 1970	DC
Deputy Prime Minister	Francesco De Martino	28 March 1970	6 August 1970	PSI
Minister of Foreign Affairs	Aldo Moro	28 March 1970	6 August 1970	DC
Minister of the Interior	Franco Restivo	28 March 1970	6 August 1970	DC
Minister of Grace and Justice	Oronzo Reale	28 March 1970	6 August 1970	PRI
Minister of Budget and Economic Planning	Antonio Giolitti	28 March 1970	6 August 1970	PSI
Minister of Finance	Luigi Preti	28 March 1970	6 August 1970	PSDI
Minister of Treasury	Emilio Colombo	28 March 1970	6 August 1970	DC
Minister of Defence	Mario Tanassi	28 March 1970	6 August 1970	PSDI
Minister of Public Education	Riccardo Misasi	28 March 1970	6 August 1970	DC
Minister of Public Works	Salvatore Lauricella	28 March 1970	6 August 1970	PSI
Minister of Agriculture and Forests	Lorenzo Natali	28 March 1970	6 August 1970	DC
Minister of Transport and Civil Aviation	Italo Viglianesi	28 March 1970	6 August 1970	PSI
Minister of Post and Telecommunications	Franco Maria Malfatti	28 March 1970	9 June 1970	DC
Minister of Post and Telecommunications	Giacinto Bosco	9 June 1970	6 August 1970	DC
Minister of Industry, Commerce and Craftsmanship	Silvio Gava	28 March 1970	6 August 1970	DC
Minister of Health	Luigi Mariotti	28 March 1970	6 August 1970	PSI
Minister of Foreign Trade	Mario Zagari	28 March 1970	6 August 1970	PSI
Minister of Merchant Navy	Salvatore Mannironi	28 March 1970	6 August 1970	DC
Minister of State Holdings	Flaminio Piccoli	28 March 1970	6 August 1970	DC
Minister of Labour and Social Security	Carlo Donat-Cattin	28 March 1970	6 August 1970	DC
Minister of Tourism and Entertainment	Giuseppe Lupis	28 March 1970	6 August 1970	PSDI
Minister for Particular Political and Coordination Tasks (Note: with special regard to the Presidency of the Italian delegation to the UN) (without portfolio)	Giacinto Bosco	28 March 1970	9 June 1970	DC
Minister for Particular Political and Coordination Tasks (without portfolio)	Carlo Russo	9 June 1970	6 August 1970	DC
Minister for Extraordinary Interventions in the South (without portfolio)	Paolo Emilio Taviani	28 March 1970	6 August 1970	DC
Minister for the Problems Related to the Implementation of the Regions (without portfolio)	Eugenio Gatto	28 March 1970	6 August 1970	DC
Minister for Parliamentary Relations (without portfolio)	Mario Ferrari Aggradi	28 March 1970	6 August 1970	DC
Minister for Scientific Research (without portfolio)	Camillo Ripamonti	28 March 1970	6 August 1970	DC
Minister for Public Administration Reform (without portfolio)	Remo Gaspari	28 March 1970	6 August 1970	DC
Secretary of the Council of Ministers	Antonio Bisaglia	28 March 1970	6 August 1970	DC
