= Fourth Rumor government =

29th government of the Italian Republic

Rumor IV Cabinet
- 29th Cabinet of Italy

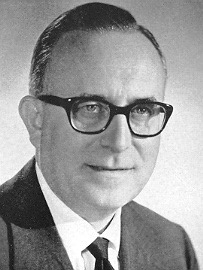
- Date formed: 8 July 1973
- Date dissolved: 14 March 1974

People and organisations
- Head of state: Giovanni Leone
- Head of government: Mariano Rumor
- Member parties: DC, PSI, PSDI, PRI
- Status in legislature: Coalition government

History
- Legislature term: VI Legislature (1972–1976)
- Predecessor: Andreotti II Cabinet
- Successor: Rumor V Cabinet

The Rumor IV Cabinet was the 29th cabinet of the Italian Republic. It held office from 8 July 1973 to 14 March 1974, for a total of 250 days (8 months, 7 days).

== Party breakdown ==
- Christian Democracy (DC): Prime minister, 16 ministers, 32 undersecretaries
- Italian Socialist Party (PSI): 6 ministers, 15 undersecretaries
- Italian Democratic Socialist Party (PSDI): 4 ministers, 9 undersecretaries
- Italian Republican Party (PRI): 2 ministers, 2 undersecretaries

== Composition ==
Cabinet members
Portfolio	Minister	Took office	Left office	Party
Prime Minister	Mariano Rumor	8 July 1973	14 March 1974	DC
Minister of Foreign Affairs	Aldo Moro	8 July 1973	14 March 1974	DC
Minister of the Interior	Paolo Emilio Taviani	8 July 1973	14 March 1974	DC
Minister of Grace and Justice	Mario Zagari	8 July 1973	14 March 1974	PSI
Minister of Budget and Economic Planning	Antonio Giolitti	8 July 1973	14 March 1974	PSI
Minister of Finance	Emilio Colombo	8 July 1973	14 March 1974	DC
Minister of Treasury	Ugo La Malfa	8 July 1973	14 March 1974	PRI
Minister of Defence	Mario Tanassi	8 July 1973	14 March 1974	PSDI
Minister of Public Education	Franco Maria Malfatti	8 July 1973	14 March 1974	DC
Minister of Public Works	Salvatore Lauricella	8 July 1973	14 March 1974	PSI
Minister of Agriculture and Forests	Mario Ferrari Aggradi	8 July 1973	14 March 1974	DC
Minister of Transport and Civil Aviation	Luigi Preti	8 July 1973	14 March 1974	PSDI
Minister of Post and Telecommunications	Giuseppe Togni	8 July 1973	14 March 1974	DC
Minister of Industry, Commerce and Craftsmanship	Ciriaco De Mita	8 July 1973	14 March 1974	DC
Minister of Health	Luigi Gui	8 July 1973	14 March 1974	DC
Minister of Foreign Trade	Gianmatteo Matteotti	8 July 1973	14 March 1974	PSDI
Minister of Merchant Navy	Giovanni Pieraccini	8 July 1973	14 March 1974	PSI
Minister of State Holdings	Antonino Pietro Gullotti	8 July 1973	14 March 1974	DC
Minister of Labour and Social Security	Luigi Bertoldi	8 July 1973	14 March 1974	PSI
Minister of Tourism and Entertainment	Nicola Signorello	8 July 1973	14 March 1974	DC
Minister of the Environment (without portfolio)	Achille Corona	8 July 1973	14 March 1974	PSI
Minister of Cultural Heritage (without portfolio)	Camillo Ripamonti	8 July 1973	14 March 1974	DC
Minister for Particular Political Tasks (Note: with special regard to the Presidency of the Italian delegation to the UN) (without portfolio)	Giuseppe Lupis	8 July 1973	14 March 1974	PSDI
Minister for Particular Political Tasks (Note: with particular regard to the bodies supervised by the Presidency of the Council) (without portfolio)	Dionigi Coppo	8 July 1973	14 March 1974	DC
Minister for Extraordinary Interventions in the South (without portfolio)	Carlo Donat-Cattin	8 July 1973	14 March 1974	DC
Minister for the Problems Related to the Implementation of the Regions (without portfolio)	Mario Toros	8 July 1973	14 March 1974	DC
Minister for Parliamentary Relations (without portfolio)	Giovanni Gioia	8 July 1973	14 March 1974	DC
Minister for Scientific Research (without portfolio)	Pietro Bucalossi	8 July 1973	14 March 1974	PRI
Minister for Public Administration Reform (without portfolio)	Silvio Gava	8 July 1973	14 March 1974	DC
Secretary of the Council of Ministers	Adolfo Sarti	8 July 1973	14 March 1974	DC
