= Second Andreotti government =

28th government of the Italian Republic

Andreotti II Cabinet
- 28th Cabinet of Italy

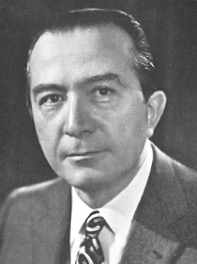
- Date formed: 26 June 1972
- Date dissolved: 8 July 1973

People and organisations
- Head of state: Giovanni Leone
- Head of government: Giulio Andreotti
- Member parties: DC, PSDI, PLI; External support: PRI
- Status in legislature: Coalition government
- Opposition parties: PCI, PSI, MSI, PSIUP

History
- Election: 1972 election
- Legislature term: VI Legislature (1972–1976)
- Predecessor: Andreotti I Cabinet
- Successor: Rumor IV Cabinet

The Andreotti II Cabinet was the 28th cabinet of the Italian Republic. It held office from 26 June 1972 to 8 July 1973, for a total of 377 days (1 year, 13 days). It was also known as Andreotti-Malagodi Cabinet.

He obtained the confidence of the House on July 7, 1972 with 329 votes in favor and 288 against.

He also obtained the trust in the Senate on July 13, 1972 with 163 votes in favor and 155 against.

The government fell due to the withdrawal of support from the PRI, following the dimming of the private cable TV "Telebiella", imposed by the minister Gioia.

The government resigned on June 12, 1973.

== Party breakdown ==
- Christian Democracy (DC): Prime minister, 16 ministers, 40 undersecretaries
- Italian Democratic Socialist Party (PSDI): 5 ministers, 10 undersecretaries
- Italian Liberal Party (PLI): 4 ministers, 8 undersecretaries

== Composition ==
Portfolio	Minister	Took office	Left office	Party
Prime Minister	Giulio Andreotti	26 June 1972	8 July 1973	DC
Deputy Prime Minister	Mario Tanassi	26 June 1972	8 July 1973	PSDI
Minister of Foreign Affairs	Giuseppe Medici	26 June 1972	8 July 1973	DC
Minister of the Interior	Mariano Rumor	26 June 1972	8 July 1973	DC
Minister of Grace and Justice	Guido Gonella	26 June 1972	8 July 1973	DC
Minister of Budget and Economic Planning	Paolo Emilio Taviani	26 June 1972	8 July 1973	DC
Minister of Finance	Athos Valsecchi	26 June 1972	8 July 1973	DC
Minister of Treasury	Giovanni Malagodi	26 June 1972	8 July 1973	PLI
Minister of Defence	Mario Tanassi	26 June 1972	8 July 1973	PSDI
Minister of Public Education	Oscar Luigi Scalfaro	26 June 1972	8 July 1973	DC
Minister of Public Works	Antonino Pietro Gullotti	26 June 1972	8 July 1973	DC
Minister of Agriculture and Forests	Lorenzo Natali	26 June 1972	8 July 1973	DC
Minister of Transport and Civil Aviation	Aldo Bozzi	26 June 1972	8 July 1973	PLI
Minister of Post and Telecommunications	Giovanni Gioia	26 June 1972	8 July 1973	DC
Minister of Industry, Commerce and Craftsmanship	Mauro Ferri	26 June 1972	8 July 1973	PSDI
Minister of Health	Remo Gaspari	26 June 1972	8 July 1973	DC
Minister of Foreign Trade	Gianmatteo Matteotti	26 June 1972	8 July 1973	PSDI
Minister of Merchant Navy	Giuseppe Lupis	26 June 1972	8 July 1973	PSDI
Minister of State Holdings	Mario Ferrari Aggradi	26 June 1972	8 July 1973	DC
Minister of Labour and Social Security	Dionigi Coppo	26 June 1972	8 July 1973	DC
Minister of Tourism and Entertainment	Vittorio Badini Confalonieri	26 June 1972	8 July 1973	PLI
Minister for Particular Political Tasks (Note: with special regard to the Presidency of the Italian delegation to the UN) (without portfolio)	Emilio Colombo	26 June 1972	8 July 1973	DC
Minister for Extraordinary Interventions in the South (without portfolio)	Paolo Emilio Taviani	26 June 1972	8 July 1973	DC
Minister for the Problems of Youth (without portfolio)	Italo Giulio Caiati	26 June 1972	8 July 1973	DC
Minister for the Problems Related to the Implementation of the Regions (without portfolio)	Fiorentino Sullo	26 June 1972	8 July 1973	DC
Minister for Parliamentary Relations (without portfolio)	Giorgio Bergamasco	26 June 1972	8 July 1973	PLI
Minister for Scientific Research (without portfolio)	Pierluigi Romita	26 June 1972	8 July 1973	PSDI
Minister for Public Administration Reform (without portfolio)	Silvio Gava	26 June 1972	8 July 1973	DC
Secretary of the Council of Ministers	Franco Evangelisti	26 June 1972	8 July 1973	DC
