= Legislature V of Italy =

5th legislature of the Italian Republic (1968–1972)

Legislature V of Italy V legislatura della Repubblica Italiana
- 5th legislature

Type
- Type: bicameral
- Houses: Chamber of Deputies; Senate of the Republic

History
- Founded: 5 June 1968
- Disbanded: 24 May 1972 (3 years, 354 days)
- Preceded by: IV Legislature
- Succeeded by: VI Legislature

Leadership
- President of the Senate: Amintore Fanfani, DC
- President of the Chamber of Deputies: Sandro Pertini, PSI

Structure
- Seats: 630 (C); 315+ (S)
- Chamber of Deputies political groups: DC (266); PCI (177); PSU (91); PLI (31); MSI (24); PSIUP (23); PRI (9); PDIUM (6); Others (3)
- Senate political groups: DC (135); PCI (101); PSU (46); PLI (16); MSI (11); PRI (2); PDIUM (2); Others (2)

Elections
- Chamber of Deputies voting system: Proportional
- Senate voting system: Proportional
- Last general election: 19 May 1968

Meeting place
- Palazzo Montecitorio, Rome (C)
- Palazzo Madama, Rome (S)

Website
- Fifth Legislature – Chamber of Deputies; Fifth Legislature – Senate

Constitution
- Constitution of Italy

The Legislature V of Italy (Italian: V Legislatura della Repubblica Italiana) was the 5th legislature of the Italian Republic, and lasted from 5 June 1968 until 24 May 1972. Its composition was the one resulting from the general election of 19 May 1968.

It was the first republican legislature to be dismissed before its term's natural expiration.

== Main chronology ==
The period of the late 1960s–1970s came to be known as the Opposti Estremismi, (from left-wing and right-wing extremists riots), later renamed anni di piombo ("years of lead") because of a wave of political terrorist attacks.

After another short Leone's government, on 12 December 1968 Mariano Rumor sworn is as prime minister for the first time, leading a government composed by DC, PSU and PRI.

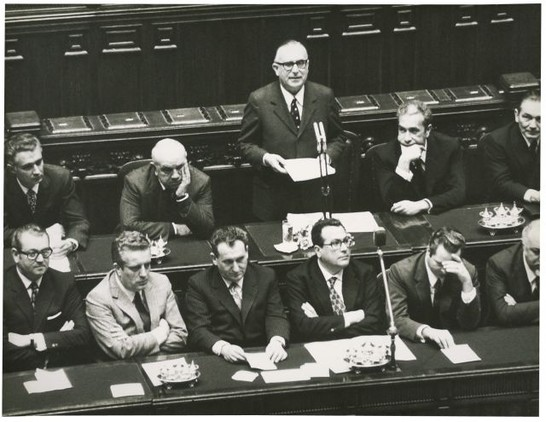
Mariano Rumor speaks to the Chamber of Deputies in March 1970

Between 1968 and 1970 a notable number of progressive reforms were carried out. On 11 December 1969 a new law extended access to higher education to all students holding a higher secondary school diploma. It was formerly limited to students who came from classical, and in some cases, scientific, curricula. Another bill, approved on 30 April 1969, introduced broad provisions covering pensions under the general scheme. The multiplying coefficient was increased to 1.85%, applied to average earnings of the best 3 years in the last 5 years of work (maximum pension, after 40 years of contribution: 74% of previous earnings). A social pension was also introduced for people over the age of 65 with low incomes and not eligible for any type of pension. In addition, cost of living indexation for all pensions (with the exception of social pensions) was introduced.

Rumor led three different governments. The second one, from August 1969 to February 1970, was a DC-only government; its collapse led to a 45-day long period without government. After this period, which included an attempt by former Prime Minister Amintore Fanfani to form a government, Rumor led a new coalition with PSI, PRI and PSDI from March until July 1970.

After another centre-left government led by Emilio Colombo, in February 1972 Giulio Andreotti was asked to form a new government which didn't obtained the confidence of the Parliament. On 28 February 1972 President Giovanni Leone dismissed the Parliament and called the first snap election in the history of the Italian Republic.

=== Presidential election ===
On 9 December 1971 the Parliament and the representatives of the 20 Italian regions met to elect the fifth President of Italy. On 24 December 1971 the Christian democrat Giovanni Leone was elected on the twenty-third ballot with 518 votes out of 1008.

== Government ==
Prime Minister	Party	Term of office		Government	Composition
Prime Minister	Party	Took office	Left office	Government	Composition
Giovanni Leone (1908–2001)	Christian Democracy	24 June 1968	12 December 1968	Leone II	DC (with PSU and PRI's external support)
Mariano Rumor (1915–1990)	Christian Democracy	12 December 1968	5 August 1969	Rumor I	DC • PSU • PRI (Organic Centre-left)
Mariano Rumor (1915–1990)	Christian Democracy	5 August 1969	27 March 1970	Rumor II	DC (with PSI, PSDI and PRI's external support)
Mariano Rumor (1915–1990)	Christian Democracy	27 March 1970	6 August 1970	Rumor III	DC • PSI • PSDI • PRI (Organic Centre-left)
Emilio Colombo (1920–2013)	Christian Democracy	6 August 1970	17 February 1972	Colombo	DC • PSI • PSDI • PRI (Organic Centre-left)
Giulio Andreotti (1919–2013)	Christian Democracy	17 February 1972	26 June 1972	Andreotti I	DC

== Parliamentary composition ==
=== Chamber of Deputies ===
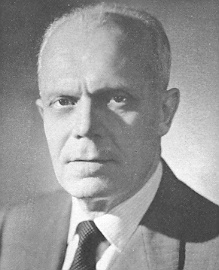
Sandro Pertini, President of the Chamber of Deputies

- President: Sandro Pertini (PSI), elected on 5 June 1968
- Vice Presidents: Guido Gonella (DC, until 24 June 1968), Benigno Zaccagnini (DC), Lucio Mario Luzzatto (PSIUP), Arrigo Boldrini (PCI), Roberto Lucifredi (DC, from 24 July 1968)

Parliamentary groups in the Chamber of Deputies
Initial composition (5 June 1968)		Final composition (24 May 1972)		
Parliamentary group	Seats	Parliamentary group	Seats	Change
Christian Democracy	266	Christian Democracy	263	▼3
Italian Communist Party	177	Italian Communist Party	166	▼11
Unified Socialist Party	91	Italian Socialist Party	62	Steady
Unified Socialist Party	91	Italian Democratic Socialist Party	29	Steady
Italian Liberal Party	31	Italian Liberal Party	30	▼1
Italian Social Movement	24	Italian Social Movement	25	▲1
Italian Socialist Party of Proletarian Unity	23	Italian Socialist Party of Proletarian Unity	22	▼1
Italian Republican Party	9	Italian Republican Party	9	Steady
Italian Democratic Party of Monarchist Unity	6	Italian Democratic Party of Monarchist Unity	5	▼1
Mixed	3	Mixed	19	▲16
Südtiroler Volkspartei	3	Südtiroler Volkspartei	3	Steady
		Independent–Non inscrits	16	▲16
Total seats	630	Total seats	630	Steady

=== Senate of the Republic ===
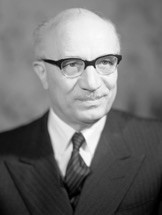
Amintore Fanfani, President of the Senate

- President: Amintore Fanfani (DC), elected on 5 June 1968
- Vice Presidents: Giuseppe Spataro (DC), Domenico Macaggi (PSI, till 9 March 1969), Pietro Secchia (PCI), Pietro Caleffi (PSI, from 13 May 1970), Italo Viglianesi (PSI, from 26 March 1970)

Parliamentary groups in the Senate of the Republic
Initial composition (5 June 1968)		Final composition (24 May 1972)		
Parliamentary group	Seats	Parliamentary group	Seats	Change
Christian Democracy	135	Christian Democracy	137	▲2
Italian Communist Party	101	Italian Communist Party	102	▲1
Unified Socialist Party	46	Italian Socialist Party	40	Steady
Unified Socialist Party	46	Italian Democratic Socialist Party	6	Steady
Italian Liberal Party	16	Italian Liberal Party	16	Steady
Italian Social Movement	11	Italian Social Movement	13	▲1
Mixed	6	Mixed	2	▼4
Italian Democratic Party of Monarchist Unity	2	Italian Democratic Party of Monarchist Unity	0	▼2
Italian Republican Party	2	Italian Republican Party	0	▼2
Südtiroler Volkspartei	2	Südtiroler Volkspartei	2	Steady
Total seats	315	Total seats	315	Steady

==== Senators for Life ====
Senator	Motivation	Appointed by	From	Till
Giovanni Gronchi	Former President of Italy	ex officio	Previous legislature	Next legislature
Cesare Merzagora	Merits in the social field	President Antonio Segni	Previous legislature	Next legislature
Ferruccio Parri	Merits in the social field	President Antonio Segni	Previous legislature	Next legislature
Meuccio Ruini	Merits in the social and scientific field	President Antonio Segni	Previous legislature	6 March 1970 (deceased)
Antonio Segni	Former President of Italy	ex officio	Previous legislature	Next legislature
Eugenio Montale	Merits in the literary field	President Giuseppe Saragat	Previous legislature	Next legislature
Giovanni Leone	Merits in the social field	President Giuseppe Saragat	Previous legislature	29 December 1971 (elected President of Italy)
Pietro Nenni	Merits in the social field	President Giuseppe Saragat	25 November 1970	Next legislature
Giuseppe Saragat	Former President of Italy	ex officio	29 December 1971	Next legislature
Amintore Fanfani	Merits in the social field	President Giovanni Leone	10 March 1972	Next legislature

== Gallery ==
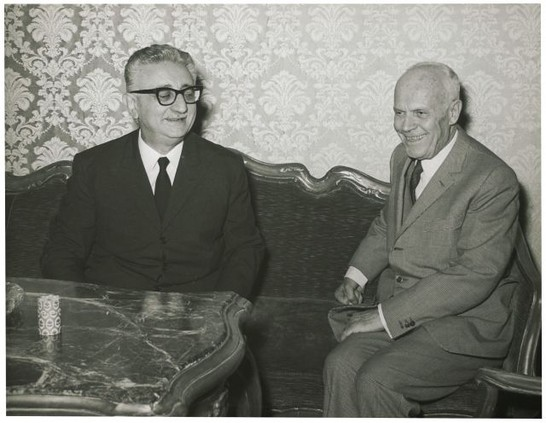
Giovanni Leone with Sandro Pertini, President of the Chamber of Deputies, in June 1968

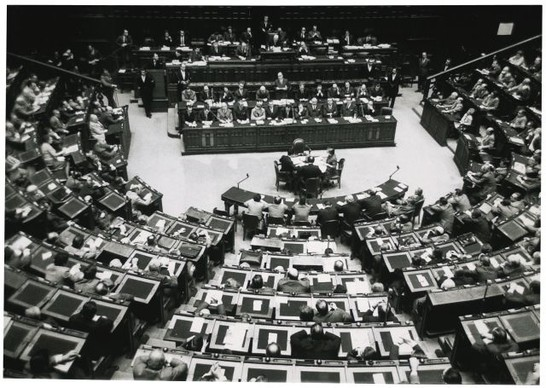
Confidence vote on Rumor III Cabinet at the Chamber of Deputies in March 1970

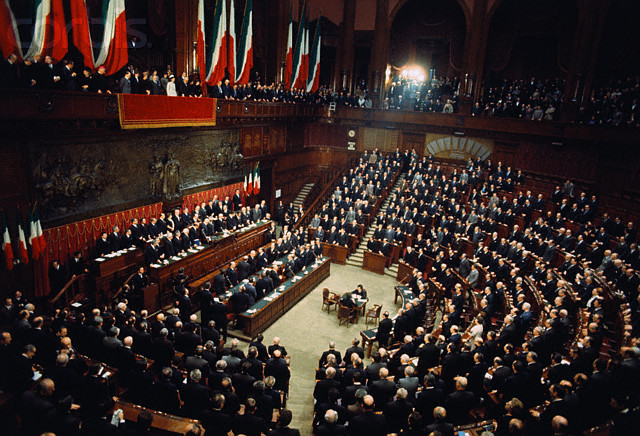
Giovanni Leone presidential inauguration on 29 December 1971
