= Minister of Economic Development (Italy) =

Ministry in the Cabinet of Italy

Minister for Enterprises and Made in Italy
- Ministro per le Imprese e il Made in Italy
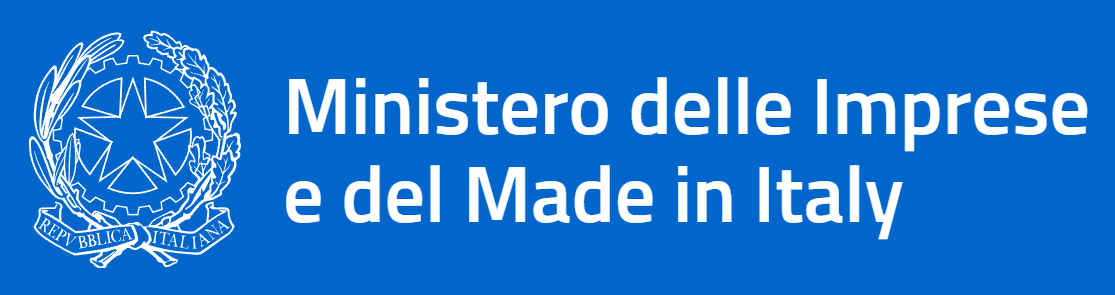

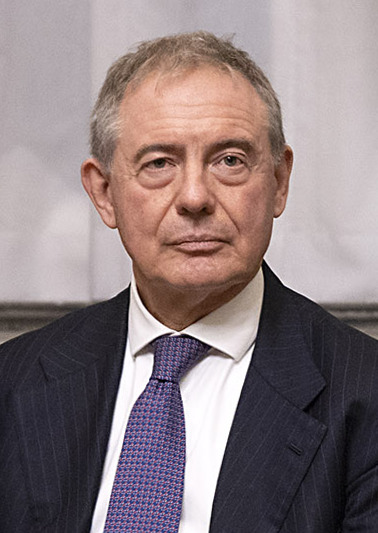
- Incumbent; Adolfo Urso since October 22, 2022
- Ministry of Enterprises and Made in Italy
- Member of: Council of Ministers; High Council of Defence
- Seat: Rome
- Appointer: The president of Italy
- Term length: No fixed term
- Formation: July 13, 1946; 80 years ago
- First holder: Rodolfo Morandi
- Website: www.mimit.gov.it

The minister of economic development, whose official title since 2022 has been Minister for Enterprises and Made in Italy, is the head of the Ministry of Enterprises and Made in Italy in Italy. The list shows also the ministers that served under the same office but with other names, in fact this minister has changed name many times.

The current minister is Adolfo Urso, appointed on 22 October 2022 by Prime Minister Giorgia Meloni.

== List of ministers ==
Parties:

- 1946–1994:
  - Italian Socialist Party
  - Christian Democracy
  - Socialist Party of Italian Workers / Italian Democratic Socialist Party
  - Italian Liberal Party
  - Italian Republican Party
  - Independent
- 1994–present:
  - Northern League / League
  - People's Party
  - Democratic Party of the Left / Democrats of the Left
  - Forza Italia / The People of Freedom
  - Democratic Party
  - Five Star Movement
  - Brothers of Italy
  - Independent

Coalitions:

- 1946–1994:
  - Centrist coalition
  - Organic Centre-left
  - Pentapartito / Quadripartito
  - Mixed coalition
- 1994–present:
  - Centre-right coalition
  - Centre-left coalition
  - Mixed coalition

Portrait	Name (Born–Died)	Term of office			Party	Government	Ref.
Portrait	Name (Born–Died)	Took office	Left office	Time in office	Party	Government	Ref.
Minister of Industry and Commerce
	Rodolfo Morandi (1903–1955)	13 July 1946	31 May 1947	322 days	Italian Socialist Party	De Gasperi II·III	
	Giuseppe Togni (1903–1981)	31 May 1947	15 December 1947	198 days	Christian Democracy	De Gasperi IV	
	Roberto Tremelloni (1900–1987)	15 December 1947	23 May 1948	160 days	Socialist Party of Italian Workers	De Gasperi IV	
	Ivan Matteo Lombardo (1902–1980)	23 May 1948	7 November 1949	1 year, 168 days	Socialist Party of Italian Workers	De Gasperi V	
	Giovanni Battista Bertone (1874–1969)	7 November 1949	27 January 1950	81 days	Christian Democracy	De Gasperi V	
	Giuseppe Togni (1903–1981)	27 January 1950	26 July 1951	1 year, 180 days	Christian Democracy	De Gasperi VI	
	Pietro Campilli (1891–1974)	26 July 1951	16 July 1953	1 year, 355 days	Christian Democracy	De Gasperi VII	
	Silvio Gava (1901–1999)	16 July 1953	17 August 1953	32 days	Christian Democracy	De Gasperi VIII	
	Piero Malvestiti (1899–1964)	17 August 1953	18 January 1954	170 days	Christian Democracy	Pella	
	Salvatore Aldisio (1890–1964)	18 January 1954	10 February 1954	23 days	Christian Democracy	Fanfani I	
	Bruno Villabruna (1884–1971)	10 February 1954	6 July 1955	1 year, 146 days	Italian Liberal Party	Scelba	
	Guido Cortese (1908–1964)	6 July 1955	19 May 1957	1 year, 322 days	Italian Liberal Party	Segni I	
	Silvio Gava (1901–1999)	19 May 1957	1 July 1958	1 year, 43 days	Christian Democracy	Zoli	
	Giorgio Bo (1905–1980)	1 July 1958	16 February 1959	230 days	Christian Democracy	Fanfani II	
	Emilio Colombo (1920–2013)	16 February 1959	21 June 1963	4 years, 125 days	Christian Democracy	Segni II; Tambroni; Fanfani III·IV	
	Giuseppe Togni (1903–1981)	21 June 1963	4 December 1963	166 days	Christian Democracy	Leone I	
	Giuseppe Medici (1907–2000)	4 December 1963	5 March 1965	1 year, 91 days	Christian Democracy	Moro I·II	
	Edgardo Lami Starnuti (1887–1968)	5 March 1965	23 February 1966	355 days	Italian Democratic Socialist Party	Moro II	
Minister of Industry, Commerce and Crafts
	Giulio Andreotti (1919–2013)	23 February 1966	12 December 1968	2 years, 293 days	Christian Democracy	Moro III	
	Giulio Andreotti (1919–2013)	23 February 1966	12 December 1968	2 years, 293 days	Christian Democracy	Leone II	
	Mario Tanassi (1916–2007)	12 December 1968	5 August 1969	236 days	Italian Democratic Socialist Party	Rumor I	
	Domenico Magrì (1903–1983)	5 August 1969	27 March 1970	234 days	Christian Democracy	Rumor II	
	Silvio Gava (1901–1999)	27 March 1970	26 June 1972	2 years, 91 days	Christian Democracy	Rumor III; Colombo	
	Silvio Gava (1901–1999)	27 March 1970	26 June 1972	2 years, 91 days	Christian Democracy	Andreotti I	
	Mauro Ferri (1920–2015)	26 July 1972	7 July 1973	346 days	Italian Democratic Socialist Party	Andreotti II	
	Ciriaco De Mita (1928–2022)	7 July 1973	23 November 1974	1 year, 139 days	Christian Democracy	Rumor IV·V	
	Carlo Donat-Cattin (1919–1991)	23 November 1974	25 November 1978	4 years, 2 days	Christian Democracy	Moro IV·V; Andreotti III·IV	
	Romano Prodi (1939– )	25 November 1978	20 March 1979	115 days	Christian Democracy	Andreotti IV	
	Franco Nicolazzi (1924–2015)	20 March 1979	4 August 1979	137 days	Italian Democratic Socialist Party	Andreotti V	
	Antonio Bisaglia (1929–1984)	4 August 1979	20 December 1980	1 year, 138 days	Christian Democracy	Cossiga I	
	Antonio Bisaglia (1929–1984)	4 August 1979	20 December 1980	1 year, 138 days	Christian Democracy	Cossiga II; Forlani	
	Filippo Maria Pandolfi (1927–2025)	20 December 1980	28 June 1981	190 days	Christian Democracy	Forlani	
	Giovanni Marcora (1922–1983)	28 June 1981	1 December 1982	1 year, 156 days	Christian Democracy	Spadolini I·II	
	Filippo Maria Pandolfi (1927–2025)	1 December 1982	4 August 1983	246 days	Christian Democracy	Fanfani V	
	Renato Altissimo (1940–2015)	4 August 1983	1 August 1986	2 years, 362 days	Italian Liberal Party	Craxi I	
	Valerio Zanone (1936–2016)	1 August 1986	18 April 1987	260 days	Italian Liberal Party	Craxi II	
	Franco Piga (1927–1990)	18 April 1987	29 July 1987	102 days	Christian Democracy	Fanfani VI	
	Adolfo Battaglia (1930–2026)	29 July 1987	12 April 1991	3 years, 257 days	Italian Republican Party	Goria; De Mita; Andreotti VI	
	Guido Bodrato (1933–2023)	12 April 1991	28 June 1992	1 year, 77 days	Christian Democracy	Andreotti VII	
	Giuseppe Guarino (1922–2020)	28 June 1992	28 April 1993	304 days	Christian Democracy	Amato I	
	Paolo Savona (1936– )	28 April 1993	19 April 1994	356 days	Independent	Ciampi	
	Paolo Baratta (1939– )	19 April 1994	10 May 1994	21 days	Independent	Ciampi	
	Vito Gnutti (1939–2008)	10 May 1994	17 January 1995	304 days	Northern League	Berlusconi I	
	Alberto Clò (1947– )	17 January 1995	17 May 1996	1 year, 121 days	Independent	Dini	
	Pier Luigi Bersani (1951– )	17 May 1996	22 December 1999	3 years, 219 days	Democratic Party of the Left / Democrats of the Left	Prodi I D'Alema I	
	Enrico Letta (1966– )	22 December 1999	11 June 2001	1 year, 171 days	Italian People's Party	D'Alema II; Amato II	
Minister of Productive Activities
	Antonio Marzano (1935– )	11 June 2001	23 April 2005	3 years, 316 days	Forza Italia	Berlusconi II	
	Claudio Scajola (1948– )	23 April 2005	17 May 2006	1 year, 24 days	Forza Italia	Berlusconi III	
Minister of Economic Development
	Pier Luigi Bersani (1951– )	17 May 2006	8 May 2008	1 year, 357 days	Democrats of the Left / Democratic Party	Prodi II	
	Claudio Scajola (1948– )	8 May 2008	4 May 2010	1 year, 361 days	The People of Freedom	Berlusconi IV	
	Silvio Berlusconi (1936–2023) As Prime Minister	4 May 2010	4 October 2010	153 days	The People of Freedom	Berlusconi IV	
	Paolo Romani (1947– )	4 October 2010	16 November 2011	1 year, 43 days	The People of Freedom	Berlusconi IV	
	Corrado Passera (1954– )	16 November 2011	28 April 2013	1 year, 163 days	Independent	Monti	
	Flavio Zanonato (1950– )	28 April 2013	22 February 2014	300 days	Democratic Party	Letta	
	Federica Guidi (1969– )	22 February 2014	5 April 2016	2 years, 43 days	Independent	Renzi	
	Matteo Renzi (1975– ) As Prime Minister	5 April 2016	10 May 2016	35 days	Democratic Party	Renzi	
	Carlo Calenda (1973– )	10 May 2016	1 June 2018	2 years, 22 days	Independent / Democratic Party	Renzi; Gentiloni	
Minister of Economic Development, Labour and Social Policies
	Luigi Di Maio (1986– )	1 June 2018	5 September 2019	1 year, 96 days	Five Star Movement	Conte I	
Minister of Economic Development
	Stefano Patuanelli (1974– )	5 September 2019	13 February 2021	1 year, 161 days	Five Star Movement	Conte II	
	Giancarlo Giorgetti (1966– )	13 February 2021	22 October 2022	1 year, 251 days	League	Draghi	
Minister for Enterprises and Made in Italy
	Adolfo Urso (1957– )	22 October 2022	Incumbent	3 years, 320 days	Brothers of Italy	Meloni	
