= Gianmatteo Matteotti =

Italian journalist and politician (1921–2000)

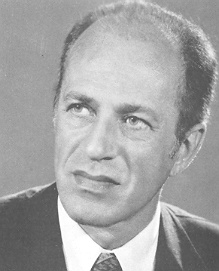

Minister of Foreign Trade
- In office 26 June 1972 – 23 November 1974
- Prime Minister: Giulio Andreotti; Mariano Rumor
- Preceded by: Camillo Ripamonti
- Succeeded by: Ciriaco De Mita

Minister of Tourism and Entertainment
- In office 6 August 1970 – 18 February 1972
- Prime Minister: Emilio Colombo
- Preceded by: Giuseppe Lupis
- Succeeded by: Giovanni Battista Scaglia

Member of the Chamber of Deputies
- In office 8 May 1948 – 11 July 1983
- Constituency: Venice (1948–1963; 1968–1972); Verona (1963–1968; 1972–1983)

Member of the Constituent Assembly
- In office 25 June 1946 – 31 January 1948
- Constituency: Pisa

Personal details
- Born: 17 February 1921 Rome, Kingdom of Italy
- Died: 14 June 2000 (aged 79) Verona, Italy
- Resting place: Fratta Polesine
- Party: PSI (1943–1947; 1959–1969); PSDI (1947–1959; 1969–1998); SDI (1998–2000)
- Parent: Giacomo Matteotti (father)

Gianmatteo Matteotti (17 February 1921 – 14 June 2000), also known as Matteo Matteotti, was an Italian socialist politician. He held several cabinet posts in the 1970s.

== Early life ==
Matteotti was born in Rome on 17 February 1921. He was the second son of Giacomo Matteotti and had an older brother, Giancarlo, and a younger sister, Isabella.

== Career and activities ==
After 8 September 1943 Matteotti participated in the War of Liberation and was a militant of the Red Flag movement.

He later joined the Italian Socialist Party (PSI) and served as its secretary, until 1946. The same year he was elected deputy to the Constituent Assembly. In 1947 he became a member of the Italian Democratic Socialist Party (PSDI) and was elected to the Chamber in 1948 for the party. In the mid-1950s he was the general secretary of the party. In 1959 Matteotti rejoined the PSI. In 1968 he left the party and rejoined the PSDI.

He was appointed minister of tourism and entertainment to the cabinet led by Prime Minister Emilio Colombo in 1970. Then he was appointed minister of foreign trade to the cabinet of Giulio Andreotti in 1973. Matteotti also held the same post in the subsequent cabinet headed by Mariano Rumor from 1973 to 1974.

== Death ==
Matteotti died in Verona on 14 June 2000. Like his father and his older brother Giancarlo (1918–2006) he was buried in Fratta Polesine.

== Electoral history ==
Election	House	Constituency	Party	Votes	Result
1946	Constituent Assembly	Pisa–Livorno–Lucca–Massa Carrara	PSIUP	9,566	Elected
1948	Chamber of Deputies	Venice–Treviso	US	6,930	Elected
1953	Chamber of Deputies	Venice–Treviso	PSDI	3,385	Elected
1958	Chamber of Deputies	Venice–Treviso	PSDI	5,250	Elected
1963	Chamber of Deputies	Verona–Padua–Vicenza–Rovigo	PSDI	4,580	Elected
1968	Chamber of Deputies	Venice–Treviso	PSU	13,639	Elected
1972	Chamber of Deputies	Verona–Padua–Vicenza–Rovigo	PSDI	8,214	Elected
1976	Chamber of Deputies	Verona–Padua–Vicenza–Rovigo	PSDI	5,015	Elected
1979	Chamber of Deputies	Verona–Padua–Vicenza–Rovigo	PSDI	2,862	Elected

Preceded by Giuseppe Saragat	Secretary of the Italian Democratic Socialist Party; 1954–1957	Succeeded by Giuseppe Saragat
