= Second Leone government =

22nd government of the Italian Republic

Leone II Cabinet
- 22nd Cabinet of Italy

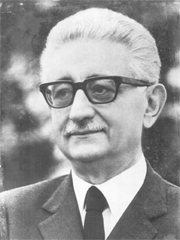
- Date formed: 25 June 1968
- Date dissolved: 13 December 1968

People and organisations
- Head of state: Giuseppe Saragat
- Head of government: Giovanni Leone
- Member party: DC; Abstention: PRI, PSI-PSDI
- Status in legislature: One-party government

History
- Legislature term: V Legislature (1968–1972)
- Predecessor: Moro III Cabinet
- Successor: Rumor I Cabinet

The Leone II Cabinet was the 22nd cabinet of the Italian Republic.

The government resigned on 19 November 1968, following the positions taken by the Republicans, Socialists, Social Democrats and Christian Democrats of opening for the formation of a new coalition Government.

== Composition ==
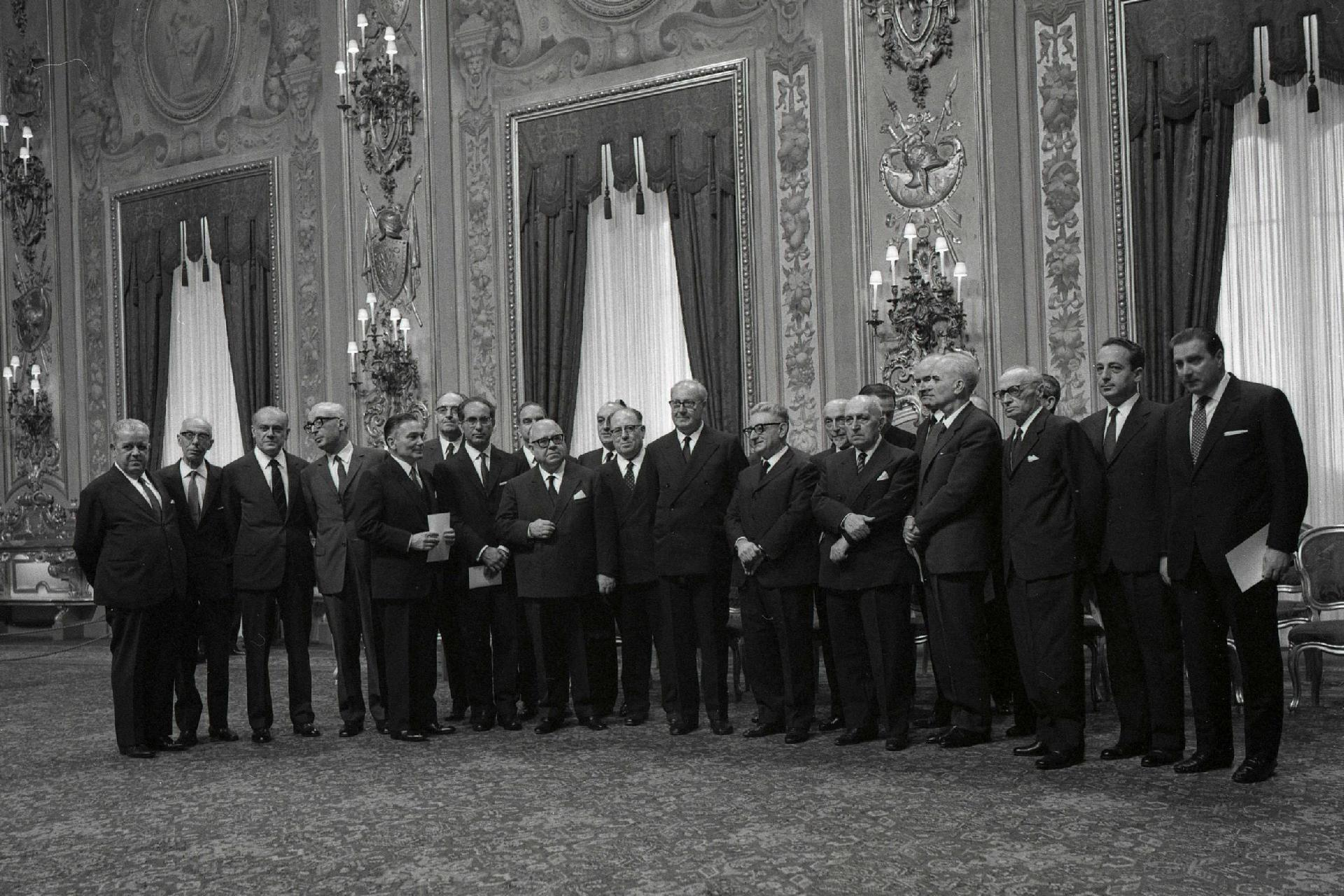
Official photo of the Leone's government after the oath at the Quirinal Palace

Portfolio	Minister	Took office	Left office	Party
Prime Minister	Giovanni Leone	25 June 1968	13 December 1968	DC
Minister of Foreign Affairs	Giuseppe Medici	25 June 1968	13 December 1968	DC
Minister of the Interior	Franco Restivo	25 June 1968	13 December 1968	DC
Minister of Grace and Justice	Guido Gonella	25 June 1968	13 December 1968	DC
Minister of Finance and of Budget and Economic Planning	Mario Ferrari Aggradi	25 June 1968	13 December 1968	DC
Minister of Treasury	Emilio Colombo	25 June 1968	13 December 1968	DC
Minister of Defence	Luigi Gui	25 June 1968	13 December 1968	DC
Minister of Public Education	Giovanni Battista Scaglia	25 June 1968	13 December 1968	DC
Minister of Public Works	Lorenzo Natali	25 June 1968	13 December 1968	DC
Minister of Agriculture and Forests	Giacomo Sedati	25 June 1968	13 December 1968	DC
Minister of Transport and Civil Aviation	Oscar Luigi Scalfaro	25 June 1968	13 December 1968	DC
Minister of Post and Telecommunications	Angelo De Luca	25 June 1968	13 December 1968	DC
Minister of Industry, Commerce and Craftsmanship	Giulio Andreotti	25 June 1968	13 December 1968	DC
Minister of Health	Ennio Zelioli-Lanzini	25 June 1968	13 December 1968	DC
Minister of Foreign Trade	Carlo Russo	25 June 1968	13 December 1968	DC
Minister of Merchant Navy	Giovanni Spagnolli	25 June 1968	13 December 1968	DC
Minister of State Holdings	Giorgio Bo	25 June 1968	13 December 1968	DC
Minister of Labour and Social Security	Giacinto Bosco	25 June 1968	13 December 1968	DC
Minister of Tourism and Entertainment	Domenico Magrì	25 June 1968	13 December 1968	DC
Minister for Special Assignments (without portfolio)	Attilio Piccioni	25 June 1968	13 December 1968	DC
Minister for Extraordinary Interventions in the South and in the depressive areas of the Center-North (without portfolio)	Italo Giulio Caiati	25 June 1968	13 December 1968	DC
Minister for Parliamentary Relations (without portfolio)	Crescenzo Mazza	25 June 1968	13 December 1968	DC
Minister for Public Administration Reform (without portfolio)	Tiziano Tessitori	25 June 1968	13 December 1968	DC
Secretary of the Council of Ministers	Luigi Michele Galli	25 June 1968	13 December 1968	DC
