= Minister of Labour and Social Policies =

Senior position in the Italian government

- Ministro del Lavoro e delle Politiche Sociali

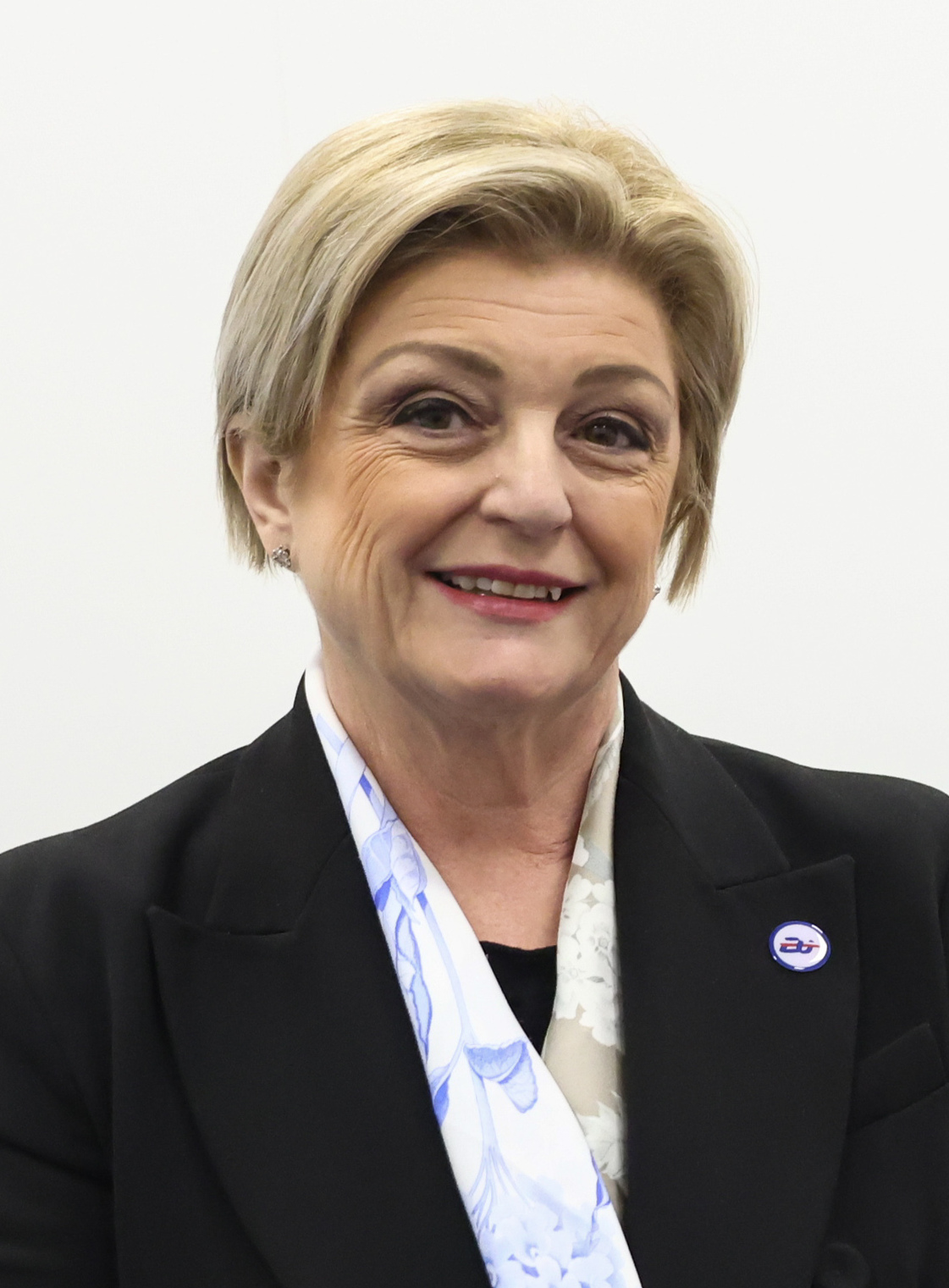
- Incumbent; Marina Calderone since October 22, 2022
- Ministry of Labour and Social Policies
- Member of: Council of Ministers
- Seat: Rome
- Appointer: The president of Italy
- Term length: No fixed term
- Formation: June 3, 1920; 106 years ago
- First holder: Mario Abbiate
- Website: www.lavoro.gov.it

This is a list of ministers of labour and social policies, a senior member of the Italian government who leads the Ministry of Labour and Social Policies. The list shows also the ministers that served under the same office but with other names, in fact this Ministry has changed name many times.

The current minister is Marina Calderone, and independent, who served since 22 October 2022 in the government of Giorgia Meloni.

== List of ministers ==
=== Kingdom of Italy ===
Parties

- 1920–1924:
  - Italian Radical Party
  - Italian Reformist Socialist Party
  - Italian People's Party
  - Italian Liberal Party
- 1924–1943:
  - National Fascist Party
- 1943–1946:
  - Italian Liberal Party
  - Italian Socialist Party
  - Christian Democracy
  - Independent

Coalitions

- 1920–1922:
  - Liberal coalition
- 1922–1943:
  - Fascist
- 1943–1946:
  - Mixed coalition

Portrait	Name (Born–Died)	Term of office			Party	Government	Ref.
Portrait	Name (Born–Died)	Took office	Left office	Time in office	Party	Government	Ref.
Minister of Labour and Social Security
	Mario Abbiate (1887–1954)	3 June 1920	15 June 1920	12 days	Italian Radical Party	Nitti II	
	Arturo Labriola (1873–1959)	15 June 1920	4 July 1921	1 year, 19 days	Italian Reformist Socialist Party	Giolitti V	
	Alberto Beneduce (1873–1959)	4 July 1921	26 February 1922	237 days	Italian Reformist Socialist Party	Bonomi I	
	Arnaldo Dello Sbarba (1873–1958)	26 February 1922	31 October 1922	247 days	Italian Reformist Socialist Party	Facta I·II	
	Stefano Cavazzoni (1881–1951)	31 October 1922	27 April 1923	247 days	Italian People's Party	Mussolini	
Minister of National Economy
	Orso Mario Corbino (1876–1937)	5 July 1923	1 July 1924	362 days	Italian Liberal Party	Mussolini	
	Cesare Nava (1861–1933)	1 July 1924	10 July 1925	1 year, 9 days	National Fascist Party	Mussolini	
	Giuseppe Belluzzo (1876–1952)	10 July 1925	9 July 1928	2 years, 365 days	National Fascist Party	Mussolini	
	Alessandro Martelli (1876–1934)	9 July 1928	12 September 1929	1 year, 65 days	National Fascist Party	Mussolini	
Minister of Corporations
	Giuseppe Bottai (1895–1959)	12 September 1929	20 July 1932	2 years, 312 days	National Fascist Party	Mussolini	
	Benito Mussolini (1883–1945) As Prime Minister	20 July 1932	11 June 1936	3 years, 327 days	National Fascist Party	Mussolini	
	Ferruccio Lantini (1886–1958)	11 June 1936	31 October 1939	3 years, 142 days	National Fascist Party	Mussolini	
	Renato Ricci (1896–1956)	31 October 1939	6 February 1943	3 years, 98 days	National Fascist Party	Mussolini	
	Carlo Tiengo (1892–1945)	6 February 1943	19 April 1943	72 days	National Fascist Party	Mussolini	
	Tullio Cianetti (1899–1976)	19 April 1943	25 July 1943	97 days	National Fascist Party	Mussolini	
Minister of Industry, Commerce and Labour
	Leopoldo Piccardi (1899–1974)	25 July 1943	16 November 1943	114 days	Independent	Badoglio I	
	Epicarmo Corbino (1890–1984)	11 February 1944	24 April 1944	73 days	Italian Liberal Party	Badoglio I	
	Attilio Di Napoli (1883–1953)	24 April 1944	18 June 1944	55 days	Italian Socialist Party	Badoglio II	
	Giovanni Gronchi (1887–1978)	18 June 1944	21 June 1945	1 year, 3 days	Christian Democracy	Bonomi II·III	
Minister of Labour and Social Security
	Gaetano Barbareschi (1889–1963)	21 June 1945	13 July 1946	1 year, 22 days	Italian Socialist Party	Parri; De Gasperi I	

=== Italian Republic ===
Parties

- 1946–1994:
  - Italian Socialist Party
  - Christian Democracy
  - Italian Democratic Socialist Party
- 1994–present:
  - Christian Democratic Centre
  - Italian Renewal
  - Democrats of the Left
  - Lega Nord
  - Democratic Party
  - The People of Freedom
  - Five Star Movement
  - Independent

Coalitions

- 1946–1994:
  - Centrist coalition
  - Organic centre-left
  - Pentapartito / Quadripartito
  - Mixed coalition
- 1994–present:
  - Centre-right coalition
  - Centre-left coalition
  - Mixed coalition

Portrait	Name (Born–Died)	Term of office			Party	Government	Ref.
Portrait	Name (Born–Died)	Took office	Left office	Time in office	Party	Government	Ref.
Minister of Labour and Social Security
	Ludovico D'Aragona (1876–1961)	13 July 1946	2 February 1947	204 days	Italian Socialist Party	De Gasperi II	
	Giuseppe Romita (1887–1958)	2 February 1947	31 May 1947	118 days	Italian Socialist Party	De Gasperi III	
	Amintore Fanfani (1908–1999)	31 May 1947	27 January 1950	2 years, 241 days	Christian Democracy	De Gasperi IV·V	
	Achille Marazza (1894–1967)	27 January 1950	26 July 1951	1 year, 180 days	Christian Democracy	De Gasperi VI	
	Leopoldo Rubinacci (1903–1969)	26 July 1951	18 January 1954	2 years, 176 days	Christian Democracy	De Gasperi VII·VIII; Pella	
	Luigi Gui (1914–2010)	18 January 1954	10 February 1954	23 days	Christian Democracy	Fanfani I	
	Ezio Vigorelli (1892–1964)	10 February 1954	19 May 1957	3 years, 98 days	Italian Democratic Socialist Party	Scelba; Segni I	
	Luigi Gui (1914–2010)	19 May 1957	17 June 1958	1 year, 29 days	Christian Democracy	Zoli	
	Adone Zoli (1887–1960) As Prime Minister	17 June 1958	1 July 1958	14 days	Christian Democracy	Zoli	
	Ezio Vigorelli (1892–1964)	1 July 1958	16 February 1959	230 days	Italian Democratic Socialist Party	Fanfani II	
	Benigno Zaccagnini (1912–1989)	16 February 1959	26 July 1960	1 year, 161 days	Christian Democracy	Segni II; Tambroni	
	Fiorentino Sullo (1921–2000)	26 July 1960	21 February 1962	1 year, 220 days	Christian Democracy	Fanfani III	
	Virginio Bertinelli (1901–1973)	21 February 1962	21 June 1963	1 year, 120 days	Italian Democratic Socialist Party	Fanfani IV	
	Umberto Delle Fave (1912–1986)	21 June 1963	4 December 1963	166 days	Christian Democracy	Leone I	
	Giacinto Bosco (1905–1997)	4 December 1963	22 July 1964	231 days	Christian Democracy	Moro I	
	Umberto Delle Fave (1912–1986)	22 July 1964	23 February 1966	1 year, 216 days	Christian Democracy	Moro II	
	Giacinto Bosco (1905–1997)	23 February 1966	12 December 1968	2 years, 293 days	Christian Democracy	Moro III	
	Giacinto Bosco (1905–1997)	23 February 1966	12 December 1968	2 years, 293 days	Christian Democracy	Leone II	
	Giacomo Brodolini (1920–1969)	12 December 1968	5 August 1969	236 days	Italian Socialist Party	Rumor I	
	Carlo Donat-Cattin (1919–1991)	5 August 1969	26 June 1972	2 years, 326 days	Christian Democracy	Rumor II	
	Carlo Donat-Cattin (1919–1991)	5 August 1969	26 June 1972	2 years, 326 days	Christian Democracy	Rumor III; Colombo	
	Carlo Donat-Cattin (1919–1991)	5 August 1969	26 June 1972	2 years, 326 days	Christian Democracy	Andreotti I	
	Dionigi Coppo (1921–2003)	26 July 1972	7 July 1973	346 days	Christian Democracy	Andreotti II	
	Luigi Bertoldi (1920–2001)	7 July 1973	23 November 1974	1 year, 139 days	Italian Socialist Party	Rumor IV·V	
	Mario Toros (1922–2018)	23 November 1974	29 July 1976	1 year, 249 days	Christian Democracy	Moro IV·V	
	Tina Anselmi (1927–2016)	29 July 1976	11 March 1978	1 year, 225 days	Christian Democracy	Andreotti III	
	Vincenzo Scotti (1933– )	11 March 1978	4 April 1980	2 years, 24 days	Christian Democracy	Andreotti IV·V; Cossiga I	
	Franco Foschi (1931–2007)	4 April 1980	28 June 1981	1 year, 85 days	Christian Democracy	Cossiga II; Forlani	
	Michele Di Giesi (1927–1983)	28 June 1981	1 December 1982	1 year, 156 days	Italian Democratic Socialist Party	Spadolini I·II	
	Vincenzo Scotti (1933– )	1 December 1982	4 August 1983	246 days	Christian Democracy	Fanfani V	
	Gianni De Michelis (1940–2019)	4 August 1983	18 April 1987	3 years, 257 days	Italian Socialist Party	Craxi I·II	
	Ermanno Gorrieri (1920–2004)	18 April 1987	29 July 1987	102 days	Christian Democracy	Fanfani VI	
	Rino Formica (1927– )	29 July 1987	22 July 1989	1 year, 358 days	Italian Socialist Party	Goria; De Mita	
	Carlo Donat-Cattin (1919–1991)	22 July 1989	17 March 1991	1 year, 238 days	Christian Democracy	Andreotti VI	
	Rosa Russo Iervolino (1936– )	18 March 1991	12 April 1991	25 days	Christian Democracy	Andreotti VI	
	Franco Marini (1933–2021)	12 April 1991	28 June 1992	1 year, 77 days	Christian Democracy	Andreotti VII	
	Nino Cristofori (1930–2015)	28 June 1992	28 April 1993	304 days	Christian Democracy	Amato I	
	Gino Giugni (1927–2009)	28 April 1993	10 May 1994	1 year, 12 days	Italian Socialist Party	Ciampi	
	Clemente Mastella (1947– )	10 May 1994	17 January 1995	252 days	Christian Democratic Centre	Berlusconi I	
	Tiziano Treu (1939– )	17 January 1995	21 October 1998	3 years, 277 days	Independent / Italian Renewal	Dini	
	Tiziano Treu (1939– )	17 January 1995	21 October 1998	3 years, 277 days	Independent / Italian Renewal	Prodi I	
	Antonio Bassolino (1947– )	21 October 1998	21 June 1999	243 days	Democrats of the Left	D'Alema I	
	Cesare Salvi (1948– )	21 June 1999	11 June 2001	1 year, 355 days	Democrats of the Left	D'Alema I·II; Amato II	
Minister of Labour and Social Policies
	Roberto Maroni (1955–2022)	11 June 2001	17 May 2006	4 years, 340 days	Lega Nord	Berlusconi II·III	
Minister of Labour and Social Security
	Cesare Damiano (1948– )	17 May 2006	8 May 2008	1 year, 326 days	Democrats of the Left / Democratic Party	Prodi II	
Minister of Labour and Social Policies
	Maurizio Sacconi (1950– )	8 May 2008	16 November 2011	3 years, 192 days	The People of Freedom	Berlusconi IV	
	Elsa Fornero (1948– )	16 November 2011	28 April 2013	1 year, 163 days	Independent	Monti	
	Enrico Giovannini (1957– )	28 April 2013	22 February 2014	300 days	Independent	Letta	
	Giuliano Poletti (1951– )	22 February 2014	1 June 2018	4 years, 99 days	Independent / Democratic Party	Renzi; Gentiloni	
Minister of Economic Development, Labour and Social Policies
	Luigi Di Maio (1986– )	1 June 2018	5 September 2019	1 year, 96 days	Five Star Movement	Conte I	
Minister of Labour and Social Policies
	Nunzia Catalfo (1967– )	5 September 2019	13 February 2021	1 year, 161 days	Five Star Movement	Conte II	
	Andrea Orlando (1969– )	13 February 2021	22 October 2022	1 year, 251 days	Democratic Party	Draghi	
	Marina Calderone (1965– )	22 October 2022	Incumbent	3 years, 321 days	Independent	Meloni	
