= Balzani =

Balzani is a surname. Notable people with the surname include:

- Annarita Balzani (born 1967), Italian sprinter
- Roberto Balzani (born 1961), Italian historian, professor and politician
- Ugo Balzani (1847–1916), Italian historian
- Vincenzo Balzani (born 1936), Italian chemist

== See also ==
- Balzano
