= Luigi Bertoldi =

Italian politician (1920–2001)

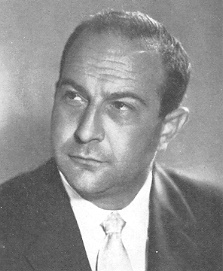

Minister of Labour and Social Policies
- In office 6 July 1973 – 22 November 1974
- Prime Minister: Mariano Rumor

Personal details
- Born: 31 January 1920 Balzano
- Died: 17 December 2001 (aged 81) Verona
- Party: Italian Socialist Party

Luigi Bertoldi (31 January 1920 – 17 December 2001) was an Italian socialist politician who served as the minister of labour and social policies between 1973 and 1974. He was a long-term member of the Italian Parliament for the Italian Socialist Party.

== Biography ==
Bertoldi was born in Bolzano on 31 January 1920. He was a member of the Italian Socialist Party. He was a member of the Italian Parliament for five terms between 1958 and 1979 and acted as one of the leaders of the Socialist Party at the parliament.

He was appointed minister of labour and social policies to the cabinet led by Prime Minister Mariano Rumor on 6 July 1973 and also served in the same post in the following cabinet which was also headed by Rumor from 14 March 1974 to 22 November 1974. He died in Verona on 17 December 2001.
