= Giovanni Porzio =

Italian politician and lawyer

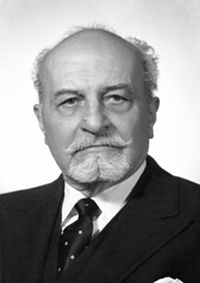
Giovanni Porzio

Giovanni Porzio (6 October 1873 – 22 September 1962) was an Italian politician and lawyer. He served as Deputy Prime Minister of Italy from 1948 to 1950.

== Biography ==
He graduated from the Vittorio Emanuele II High School in Naples and graduated in law at the University of Naples Federico II, then began his forensic activity by collaborating with the lawyer and scholar Alfonso Ridola, with Alberto Geremicca (who would later be mayor of Naples).

Subsequently, he exercised autonomously and as a brilliant criminal lawyer at the Court of Naples and in Campania, acquiring a reputation that he maintained once he entered the Chamber in March 1912, remaining among the counters of deputies until 1929.

Liberal, he became an Undersecretary for Justice in the Nitti government (from March to May 1920), then undersecretary in the second Nitti government (May–June 1920), joining the Undersecretariat to the presidency of the council in the last government of Giovanni Giolitti (from June 1920 to July 1921). To his electors he affirmed the necessity of defending the prestige of the state, safeguarding the order by repressing every attempt at violence, be it red or in opposition to it.

For the policies of 1924 he agreed to enter the list, but, disappointed by fascism, he withdrew from politics in 1929.

His political career resumed after liberation, first as a consultant and then as a constituent.

In 1948 he was appointed senator of law ex-III disp. trans. of the Italian Constitution, by virtue of the six previous legislatures.

He was also president of the Naples Bar Association.
