= Giuseppe Lupis =

Italian journalist and politician (1896–1997)

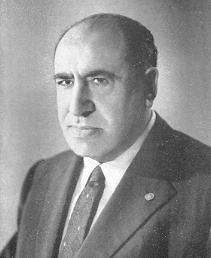
- Born: 28 March 1896; Ragusa
- Died: 19 October 1979 (aged 83)
- Occupation: Journalist
- Political party: PSDI

Giuseppe Lupis (28 March 1896 – 19 October 1979) was an Italian journalist and socialist politician, a member of the Italian Democratic Socialist Party. He settled in the United States when Italy was under Fascist rule. Then he returned to Italy and held numerous cabinet posts.

== Early life and education ==
Lupis was born in Ragusa on 28 March 1896. His family were part of the Sicilian branch of the Lupis, a local nobility, the barons of the Carrozziero in Ragusa.

== Career and activities ==
During the Fascist rule in Italy Lupis went into exile in New York City together with Giuseppe Saragat. There Lupis edited a bilingual magazine entitled Il Mondo which was a biweekly publication established by him in 1939. In New York Lupis also worked in the Office of War Information at the Federal Communications Commission.

Following his return to Italy Lupis became a member of the National Council. Then he served as a deputy seven times (from the first to seventh legislatures) and held various cabinet posts. Lupis was the undersecretary for foreign affairs in the following cabinets: the third De Gasperi cabinet, the second and fourth cabinets of Amintore Fanfani and the first, second and third cabinets of Aldo Moro. Lupis was the minister of merchant navy in the first cabinet of Mariano Rumor (12 December 1968 – 4 August 1969) and the second cabinet of Giulio Andreotti. He also served as the minister of tourism and entertainment in the third cabinet of Mariano Rumor (27 March 1970 – 5 August 1970). His other cabinet posts included the minister without portfolio with responsibility for the United Nations in the cabinet of Emilio Colombo (6 August 1970 – 16 February 1972) and in the fourth cabinet of Mariano Rumor and the minister without portfolio with responsibility for cultural heritage and the environment in the fifth cabinet of Mariano Rumor.

Lupis was also the president of the Italian National Press Federation from 21 January 1955 to 30 April 1956. He died on 19 October 1979.
