= Guido De Martino =

Italian politician

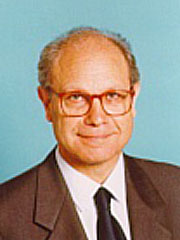

Senator of the Republic of Italy
- In office 15 April 1994 – 29 May 2001
- Constituency: Campania

Member of the Italian Chamber of Deputies
- In office 23 April 1992 – 14 April 1994
- Constituency: Naples
- In office 12 July 1983 – 1 July 1987
- Constituency: Naples

Personal details
- Born: 22 August 1943 (age 83) Somma Vesuviana, Naples, Italy
- Party: Italian Socialist Party
- Occupation: Professor of History and Philosophy

Guido De Martino (born Somma Vesuviana, 22 August 1943) is a former Italian politician of the Italian Socialist Party. He is also the son of the late socialist politician Francesco De Martino and was kidnapped for 40 days in 1977 by the Camorra.

== Biography ==
De Martino was born in Somma Vesuviana, Naples Italy on 22 August 1943 to the family of Francesco De Martino. He would get a degree in philosophy before going on to become a professor of history and philosophy.

While serving as secretary of the Italian Socialist Party (PSI) in Naples, De Martino was kidnapped in Naples on 5 April 1977. He had been taken by the Neapolitan Mafia, the Camorra, who held him for six weeks. He was only freed after a one billion lire ransom, that was raised by the party, was paid to the perpetrators. It would later be revealed that some of the funds the party had provided were attained through kidnappings done by the Red Brigades. This scandal has been compared to the Moro kidnapping, by those who suspected similar political beliefs between the victims to have been the cause.

De Martino would go on to achieve electoral victory in Naples as a member of the PSI, securing a seat in the Italian Chamber of Deputies during the IX legislature and again in XI legislature. He continued to work with the PSI, getting elected to the Italian Senate during the XII and XIII legislatures.

== See also ==
- List of kidnappings
- List of solved missing person cases
