= Camillo Ripamonti =

Italian politician (1919–1997)

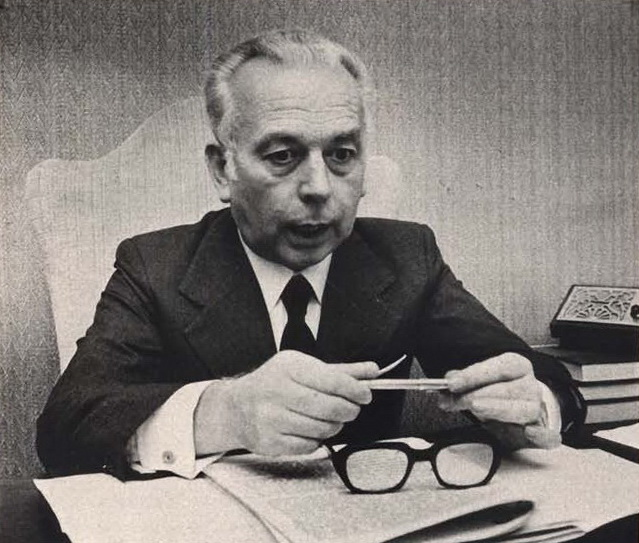
- Born: 25 May 1919; Gorgonzola, Italy
- Died: 23 April 1997 (aged 77); Milan, Italy
- Occupation: Politician

Camillo Ripamonti (25 May 1919 – 23 April 1997) was an Italian politician. Born in Gorgonzola, he was the mayor of his hometown for 34 years, from 1946 to 1980, and between 1968 and 1974 he was appointed as minister several times in various Italian cabinets.

He was Deputy for Christian Democracy from 1958 to 1968 and Senator from 1968 to 1983.

== Government offices ==
- Minister of Health in the Rumor I Cabinet, from 12 December 1968 to 5 August 1969
- Minister of Health in the Rumor II Cabinet, from 5 August 1969 to 27 March 1970
- Minister of Scientific Research in the Rumor III Cabinet, from 27 March 1970 to 6 August 1970
- Minister of Scientific Research in the Colombo Cabinet, from 6 August 1970 to 17 February 1972
- Minister of Foreign Trade in the Andreotti I Cabinet, from 17 February 1972 to 26 June 1972
- Minister of Cultural heritage in the Rumor IV Cabinet, from 7 July 1973 to 14 March 1974
- Minister of Tourism and entertainment in the Rumor V Cabinet, from 14 March 1974 to 23 November 1974
