= Giacomo Brodolini =

Italian politician (1920–1969)

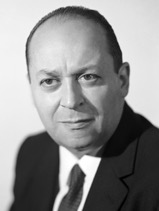

Minister of Labour and Social Security
- In office December 1969 – 11 July 1969
- Prime Minister: Mariano Rumor

Personal details
- Born: 19 July 1920 Recanati, Kingdom of Italy
- Died: 11 July 1969 (aged 48) Zürich, Switzerland
- Party: PdA (1946–1948); PSI (1948–1969)
- Education: University of Bologna

Giacomo Brodolini (19 July 1920 – 11 July 1969) was an Italian socialist politician and trade unionist. He served as the minister of labour and social security between December 1968 and 1969.

== Early life and education ==
Brodolini was born in Recanati on 19 July 1920. After graduating from high school he joined the army in 1940 and served there during World War II. Then he graduated from the University of Bologna receiving a degree in literature.

== Career ==
In 1946 Brodolini joined the Action Party (PdA), but he left it to join the Italian Socialist Party (PSI) in 1948. He was the deputy secretary of the Italian General Confederation of Labour from 1955 to 1960. He also served as the deputy secretary of the PSI from 1963 to 1966. He held the same position in the Unified Socialist Party, formed upon the merger of the PSI with the Italian Democratic Socialist Party (PSDI), until 1968. He was elected to the Italian Parliament in 1953 and became a senator in 1968. He was appointed minister of labour and social security in December 1968.

== Death ==
Brodolini died of cancer at a hospital in Zürich on 11 July 1969.
