= Francesco De Martino =

Italian politician (1907–2002)

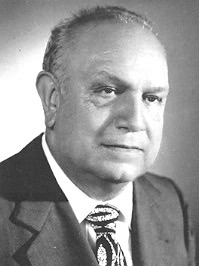

Deputy Prime Minister of Italy
- In office 6 August 1970 – 15 January 1972
- Prime Minister: Emilio Colombo
- Preceded by: Paolo Emilio Taviani
- Succeeded by: Mario Tanassi
- In office 12 December 1968 – 5 July 1969
- Prime Minister: Mariano Rumor
- Preceded by: Pietro Nenni
- Succeeded by: Paolo Emilio Taviani

Member of the Senate of the Republic
- Life tenure 1 June 1991 – 18 November 2002
- Appointed by: Francesco Cossiga
- In office 12 July 1983 – 1 July 1987
- Constituency: Campania

Member of the Chamber of Deputies
- In office 8 May 1948 – 11 July 1983
- Constituency: Naples

Personal details
- Born: 31 May 1907 Naples, Campania, Italy
- Died: 18 November 2002 (aged 95) Naples, Campania, Italy
- Party: Pd'A (1943–1946); PSI (1946–1994); DS (1998–2002)
- Children: Guido De Martino

Francesco de Martino (31 May 1907 – 18 November 2002) was an Italian jurist, politician, lifetime senator (1991–2002) and former Vice President of the Council of Ministers. He was considered by many to be the conscience of the Italian Socialist Party.

== Biography ==
De Martino was born on 31 May 1907 in Naples, Italy. He graduated from the law school Federico II in Naples, and, under the guidance of Enrico De Nicola, embarked on the study of law and economics and became a distinguished scholar of Roman law.

Emeritus Professor of law at the law school Federico II in Naples, he published several tomes, among which, the History of the Roman Constitution (in six tomes, which was compared for his monumental significance to the "Staatsrecht" by Theodor Mommsen) and the Economic History of Ancient Rome; his publications were translated in English, Spanish, German, French and Chinese.

He first joined the Action Party (an anti-fascist political party) in 1943, and then joined the reconstituted Socialist Party in 1945.

At the first elections of the new Italian Republic in 1948, he was elected to Parliament with the Popular Front alliance of communists and socialists. He soon won the confidence of party leader Pietro Nenni, to whom he became vice secretary. In 1959, Nenni would entrust De Mortino with leading the socialist magazine Mondoperaio.

De Martino served as Deputy Prime Minister during the Rumor I, Rumor III, and Colombo governments.

De Martino was twice the PSI's candidate for the presidential elections, in 1971 and 1978. This time, however, the more popular socialist, the former Speaker of the Chamber of Deputies, Sandro Pertini was elected. De Martino's candidacy was tarnished when the family paid a 1bn lire ransom for his release, his son Guido, who was kidnapped by the Camorra for 40 days. The kidnappers were eventually captured, but those behind them were never discovered.

In 1976, he was ousted as party secretary by Bettino Craxi when the PSI lost in the elections, falling below 10% for the second time. De Martino became the scapegoat, and Craxi became Italy's first socialist Prime Minister in 1983.

Nonetheless, he continued to be elected to the Parliament, and, on 1 June 1991, was appointed senator for life. After this appointment he joined the post-communist Democrats of the Left. He was dismayed by the demise of the historical socialist party after the corruption under Craxi.

He resumed his academic career at the law school Federico II, where his secular funeral was celebrated in the presence of the President of Italy, Carlo Azeglio Ciampi.

De Martino died in Naples on 18 November 2002. He is survived by his children, Armando, Guido, Antonino, Elisa and Laura.

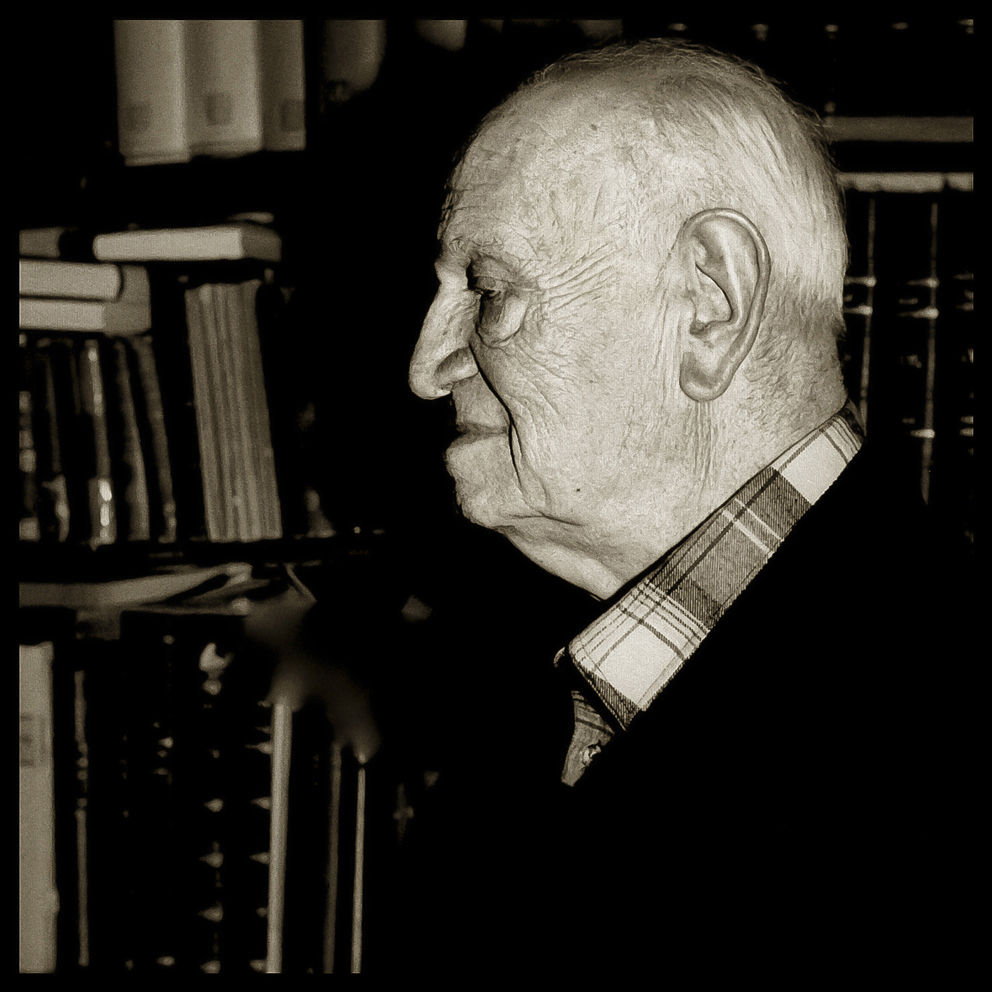
Francesco De Martino in 1995, photographed by Augusto De Luca

== Electoral history ==
| Election | House | Constituency | Party | Votes | Result |
|---|---|---|---|---|---|
| 1948 | Chamber of Deputies | Naples–Caserta | FDP | 20,452 | Elected |
| 1953 | Chamber of Deputies | Naples–Caserta | PSI | 42,108 | Elected |
| 1958 | Chamber of Deputies | Naples–Caserta | PSI | 43,295 | Elected |
| 1963 | Chamber of Deputies | Naples–Caserta | PSI | 59,965 | Elected |
| 1968 | Chamber of Deputies | Naples–Caserta | PSI | 61,431 | Elected |
| 1972 | Chamber of Deputies | Naples–Caserta | PSI | 66,296 | Elected |
| 1976 | Chamber of Deputies | Naples–Caserta | PSI | 69,244 | Elected |
| 1979 | Chamber of Deputies | Naples–Caserta | PSI | 83,634 | Elected |
| 1983 | Senate of the Republic | Campania – Naples III | PSI | 11,243 | Elected |
