= Balzano =

Balzano is an Italian surname which translates to "strange" or "odd". Notable people with the surname include:

- Antonio Balzano (born 1986), Italian association football player
- Birago Balzano (1936–2022), Italian cartoonist
- Flora Balzano (born 1951), Canadian writer and comedian
- Marco Balzano (born 1978), Italian writer
