= Italo Viglianesi =

Italian trade unionist politician and syndicalist

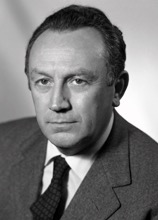
Italo Viglianesi

Italo Viglianesi (1 January 1916 – 19 January 1995) was an Italian trade unionist politician and syndicalist.

Viglianesi was born in Caltagirone, Italy. In 1950, he was one of the founders and first general secretary of Italian Labour Union (UIL) one of the biggest Italian trade union centers. He was minister of transport from 27 March 1970 to 17 February 1972 under Mariano Rumor and Emilio Colombo cabinets representing the Italian Socialist Party (PSI). He was senator from 1963 to 1979 when he retired. He was vice-president of the Italian Senate for 1 year. He died in Rome, aged 79.

== See also ==
- Italian Labour Union
