= Organic centre-left =

Italian party system (1962–1976)

Organic centre-left Centro-sinistra organico
- Leaders: Amintore Fanfani; Pietro Nenni; Aldo Moro
- Founded: 1962
- Dissolved: 1976
- Preceded by: Centrism
- Succeeded by: Historic Compromise (1976); Pentapartito (1981)
- Headquarters: Rome
- Ideology: Christian democracy Social democracy
- Political position: Centre-left

The organic centre-left (Italian: centro-sinistra organico) was a coalition of four Italian political parties that formed governments throughout the 1960s and the middle 1970s. The coalition, composed of the Italian system of centrism parties Christian Democracy (DC) and the Italian Democratic Socialist Party (PSDI) plus the consistent addition of the Italian Republican Party (PRI), was "organic" in the sense that the Italian Socialist Party (PSI) was fully part of the government, was within the organisation of the cabinet. This was different from first two centre-left governments in the early 1960s where the PSI gave an external support only.

Within the context of the party system in the history of the Italian Republic and the First Italian Republic in particular, it was succeeded by the government of national solidarity and the Historic Compromise between the DC and the Italian Communist Party (PCI) in 1976, while as a proper coalition it was followed by the Pentapartito between 1979 (the end of the two national solidarity governments of the Historic Compromise) and 1981 (the year it was formally established).

== History ==
From 1947 to 1962, the Christian Democrats led a succession of centre-right coalition governments. In 1962, however, the Christian Democracy (DC) leader Amintore Fanfani formed a cabinet with members of the PSDI and the PRI; it is considered the beginning of the organic centre-left and the centre-left more broadly. The two Fanfani governments in 1962 and 1963 approved many social reforms and more left-leaning and social-democratic policies, such as the nationalisation of industries like Enel.

On 4 December 1963, Aldo Moro formed the first proper organic centre-left government with the active support of the PSI. Prominent socialist politicians, such as Pietro Nenni and Antonio Giolitti, were appointed ministers. In 1968, after three consecutive centre-left governments, Moro resigned as Prime Minister of Italy and his successor, Giovanni Leone, formed a cabinet composed only of DC members. After a few years, the DC leader Mariano Rumor proposed a new government coalition composed of centre-left parties. The Rumor government approved the divorce law, a new Workers' Statute, the creation of the Antimafia Commission, and a reform to give more powers and autonomy to the Italian regions.

The coalition still judged the PCI and the neo-fascist Italian Social Movement (MSI) as too extreme for participation in government. Internationally, the coalition relied on a strong pro-Europeanism and Atlanticism from a pro-Arab policy. This fact caused many frictions between the socialists and the more liberal parties, and was one of the causes of the dissolution of the coalition. The coalition also adopted a pro-China policy, as it established foreign relations with the People's Republic of China in 1970. The successor of the organic centre-left was the Pentapartito, a coalition between the four parties that formed a new centre-left coalition with the more social liberal Italian Liberal Party (PLI) under Valerio Zanone.

== Programme ==
The coalition programme was based on an extensive reformist agenda:

- Extension of compulsory education from elementary school to secondary school (1962)
- Free school books (1964)
- Nationalisation of the electric industry (1962)
- Creation of Enel (1962)
- Divorce law (1970), despite its refusal by the DC, which organised the unsuccessful 1974 Italian divorce referendum
- Worker's Statute (1970)
- Creation of the Antimafia Commission (1963)
- Supports of decentralisation and creation of the regions (1970)

== Composition ==
Party	Main ideology	Leaders
Christian Democracy	Christian democracy	Amintore Fanfani, Aldo Moro
Italian Socialist Party	Democratic socialism	Pietro Nenni, Francesco De Martino
Italian Democratic Socialist Party	Social democracy	Giuseppe Saragat
Italian Republican Party	Social liberalism	Ugo La Malfa

== Electoral results ==
=== Italian Parliament ===
Chamber of Deputies
Election year	Votes	%	Seats	+/−	Prime Minister
1963	18,325,502 (1st)	59.6	386 / 630	–	Aldo Moro
1968	17,667,573 (1st)	55.6	366 / 630	▼20	Mariano Rumor
1972	18,793,462 (1st)	56.3	371 / 630	▲5	Giulio Andreotti

Senate of the Republic
Election year	Votes	%	Seats	+/−	Prime Minister
1963	15,834,690 (1st)	57.6	187 / 315	–	Aldo Moro
1968	15,949,408 (1st)	55.7	183 / 315	▼4	Mariano Rumor
1972	17,223,486 (1st)	57.2	184 / 315	▲1	Giulio Andreotti

== See also ==
- Centre-left coalition (Italy)
