= Luigi Gui =

Italian politician and philosopher

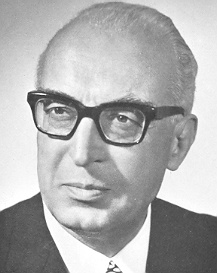

Minister of the Interior
- In office 23 November 1974 – 12 February 1976
- Prime Minister: Aldo Moro
- Preceded by: Paolo Emilio Taviani
- Succeeded by: Aldo Moro
Other Ministerial offices
Minister for the Organization of Public Administration
In office 14 March 1974 – 3 October 1974
Prime Minister	Mariano Rumor
Preceded by	Silvio Gava
Succeeded by	Francesco Cossiga
Minister of Health
In office 7 July 1973 – 14 March 1974
Prime Minister	Mariano Rumor
Preceded by	Remo Gaspari
Succeeded by	Vittorino Colombo
Minister of Defense
In office 24 June 1968 – 23 March 1970
Prime Minister	Giovanni Leone; Mariano Rumor
Preceded by	Roberto Tremelloni
Succeeded by	Mario Tanassi
Minister of Public Education
In office 21 February 1962 – 24 June 1968
Prime Minister	Amintore Fanfani; Giovanni Leone; Aldo Moro
Preceded by	Giacinto Bosco
Succeeded by	Giovanni Battista Scaglia
Minister of Labour and Social Security
In office 18 January 1954 – 8 February 1954
Prime Minister	Amintore Fanfani
Preceded by	Leopoldo Rubinacci
Succeeded by	Ezio Vigorelli
Parliamentary offices
Member of the Chamber of Deputies
In office 20 June 1979 – 11 July 1983
Constituency	Verona
In office 8 May 1948 – 4 July 1976
Constituency	Verona
Member of the Senate of the Republic
In office 5 July 1976 – 19 June 1979
Constituency	Veneto
Member of the Constituent Assembly
In office 25 June 1946 – 31 January 1948
Constituency	Verona

Personal details
- Born: 26 September 1914 Padua, Veneto, Italy
- Died: 26 April 2010 (aged 95) Padua, Veneto, Italy
- Party: Christian Democracy
- Education: Università Cattolica del Sacro Cuore
- Profession: Philosopher, Politician

Luigi Gui (26 September 1914 – 26 April 2010) was an Italian politician and philosopher.

== Biography ==
Gui was born in Padua (Veneto). He graduated in philosophy at the Catholic University in Milan. He was an officer of the Alpini corps of the Italian Army, and fought in USSR during World War II. Later, he was a member of the Italian Constituent Assembly which later became the modern Italian Parliament. He was deputy and senator from 1948 to 1983.

He served as Minister of labour and social security, Minister of education, Minister of health, Minister of the Interior, Minister of Defense and Minister of Public Administration.

He died on 26 April 2010, at the age of 95.

== Electoral history ==
Election	House	Constituency	Party	Votes	Result
1946	Constituent Assembly	Verona–Padova–Vicenza–Rovigo	DC	12,914	Elected
1948	Chamber of Deputies	Verona–Padova–Vicenza–Rovigo	DC	33,743	Elected
1953	Chamber of Deputies	Verona–Padova–Vicenza–Rovigo	DC	31,552	Elected
1958	Chamber of Deputies	Verona–Padova–Vicenza–Rovigo	DC	33,084	Elected
1963	Chamber of Deputies	Verona–Padova–Vicenza–Rovigo	DC	63,817	Elected
1968	Chamber of Deputies	Verona–Padova–Vicenza–Rovigo	DC	58,768	Elected
1972	Chamber of Deputies	Verona–Padova–Vicenza–Rovigo	DC	61,327	Elected
1976	Senate of the Republic	Veneto – Este	DC	57,017	Elected
1979	Chamber of Deputies	Verona–Padova–Vicenza–Rovigo	DC	46,999	Elected
