= Paolo Emilio Taviani =

Italian political leader, economist, and historian (1912–2001)

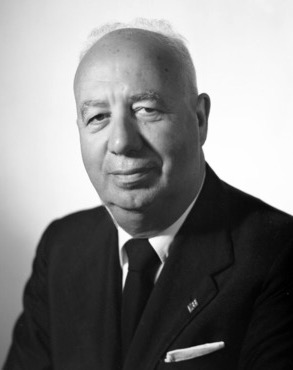

Minister of the Interior
- In office 7 July 1973 – 23 November 1974
- Prime Minister: Mariano Rumor
- Preceded by: Mariano Rumor
- Succeeded by: Luigi Gui
- In office 4 December 1963 – 24 June 1968
- Prime Minister: Aldo Moro
- Preceded by: Mariano Rumor
- Succeeded by: Franco Restivo
- In office 21 February 1962 – 21 June 1963
- Prime Minister: Amintore Fanfani
- Preceded by: Mario Scelba
- Succeeded by: Mariano Rumor

Minister of Budget
- In office 17 February 1972 – 7 July 1973
- Prime Minister: Giulio Andreotti
- Preceded by: Antonio Giolitti
- Succeeded by: Antonio Giolitti

Minister of Treasury
- In office 25 March 1960 – 21 February 1962
- Prime Minister: Fernando Tambroni; Amintore Fanfani
- Preceded by: Fernando Tambroni
- Succeeded by: Roberto Tremelloni

Minister of Finance
- In office 15 February 1959 – 23 March 1960
- Prime Minister: Antonio Segni
- Preceded by: Luigi Preti
- Succeeded by: Giuseppe Trabucchi

Minister of Defence
- In office 17 August 1953 – 1 July 1958
- Prime Minister: Giuseppe Pella; Amintore Fanfani; Mario Scelba; Antonio Segni; Adone Zoli
- Preceded by: Giuseppe Codacci Pisanelli
- Succeeded by: Antonio Segni
Parliamentary offices
Member of the Senate of the Republic
Life tenure 1 June 1991 – 18 June 2001
Appointed by	Francesco Cossiga
In office 5 July 1976 – 1 June 1991
Constituency	Liguria
Member of the Chamber of Deputies
In office 8 May 1948 – 4 July 1976
Constituency	Genoa–Imperia–La Spezia–Savona
Member of the Constituent Assembly
In office 25 June 1946 – 31 January 1948
Constituency	Genoa–Imperia–La Spezia–Savona

Personal details
- Born: 6 November 1912 Genoa, Kingdom of Italy
- Died: 18 June 2001 (aged 88) Rome, Italy
- Party: Christian Democracy
- Spouse: Vittoria Festa (m. 1941)
- Children: Ferdinando; Cesare; Ida; Giuseppe; Andrea; Elide; Pietro; Paolo
- Profession: Politician; university professor

Paolo Emilio Taviani (6 November 1912 – 18 June 2001) was an Italian political leader, economist, and historian of the career of Christopher Columbus. He was a partisan leader in Liguria, a Gold Medal of the Italian resistance movement, then a member of the Consulta (the national assembly gathered to direct the transformation of the monarchy into a republic) and the Constituent Assembly, later of the Italian Parliament from 1948 until his death. Several times minister in the Republic's governments. He was author of studies on economics and important works on Columbus, university professor and journalist.

Giorgio Napolitano, the then-President of the Italian Republic, described him as an "eminent political and government figure who for decades continued to bear witness to the diversity of ideals that inspired the Resistance."

== Biography ==
=== Early years (1912–1943) ===
Taviani was born in Genoa on 6 November 1912. His mother, Elide Banchelli, was an elementary school teacher. His father, Ferdinando, was a headmaster and one of the founders of the Genoese section of the Italian People's Party (1919). After graduating from the Classical “Liceo”, Taviani went on to university where he earned a law degree in 1934. The same year he obtained his journalist's license and began working for various Catholic oriented newspapers. In 1936 he obtained a second degree in social sciences from the prestigious Scuola Normale Superiore of Pisa (Collegio Mussolini i.e. present day Sant'Anna School of Advanced Studies) and in 1939 he earned a third degree in Letters and Philosophy from the Catholic University of Milan. The next year he was professor of History and Philosophy in the public “Licei” as well as assistant lecturer in geography at the University of Genoa. From 1943 he was professor of Demographics in the Faculty of Law in Genoa.

=== Resistance (1943–1945) ===
Already in secondary school Taviani joined the Catholic group that was most sensitive to social issues. At university he became head of the Genoese branch of FUCI (Federazione Universitaria dei Cattolici Italiani). Following the Lateran Pacts, Taviani, a young man at the time, shared in the illusion that Fascism might one day evolve into a movement for social justice inspired by Catholic values. Consequently, at the age of 18 he joined the PNF. But the fascists’ belligerent policies and, above all, the racial laws of 1938 shattered that illusion. By the eve of the war, Taviani was firmly in the camp of the anti-fascists. On 27 July 1943 just before the fall of the regime, Taviani founded in Liguria the section of the “Partito-Cristiano-Sociale Democratico” (later Christian Democracy, DC) bringing together young people from the Christian Social Movement with the older members of the People's Party.

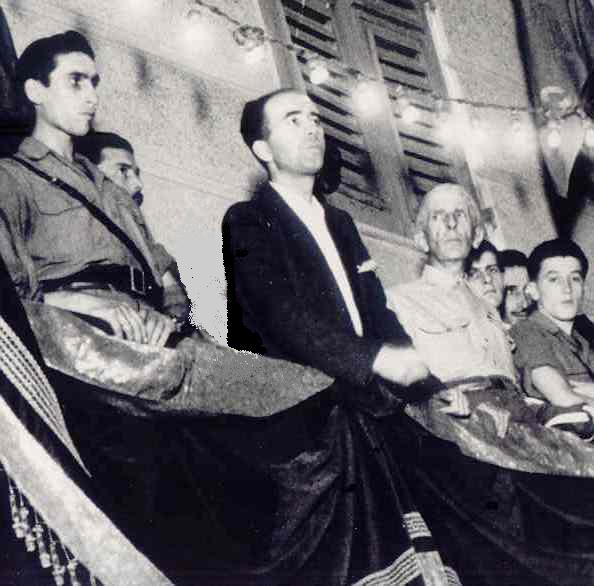
Taviani during a speech in Genoa, 1945

Immediately after 8 September, under the pseudonym of Riccardo Pittaluga, Taviani founded the Committee for National Liberation in Liguria (CLNL) as representative of the Christian Democracy. His clandestine activities often brought him among the partisans in the mountains (it was in these years that he became close friends with the commanders Aldo Gastaldi, "Bisagno" and Aurelio Ferrando, "Scrivia"). Taviani maintained contacts with Allied military missions that had parachuted behind enemy lines. He was also editor of La Voce d'Italia a banned periodical published by the Resistance in Liguria. Within the CLNL Taviani often argued the need for a single military command that could effectively coordinate the efforts of volunteers from so many different political backgrounds. On the night of 23 April 1945 the CLNL assumed the leadership of the insurrection in Genoa. On the evening of 25 April the German commander surrendered to representatives of the CLNL. The next morning it was Taviani who announced that the city had been liberated in a radio address broadcast by the BBC: "Genoa is free. People of Genoa, rejoice! For the first time in the history of this war a military unit has surrendered to the spontaneous forces of a people: the people of Genoa!" For his activity in the Resistance Taviani would later receive the gold medal for Merit in War in Italy, Gold medals for Merit in the United States and the Soviet Union, the title of Grand Official of the Légion d'Honneur in France. Taviani wrote about the Resistance in the Breve storia dell’insurrezione di Genova, in the collection of short stories Pittaluga Racconta as well as in dozens of articles. His early years in the Resistance marked Taviani's entire political career.

From 1963 he was President of Italian Federation of Volunteers for Freedom (FIVL). In 1987 he was appointed President of the Historical Museum of the Liberation of Rome "Via Tasso". On 25 April 1994, he gave a passionate speech in defence of the values of the Resistance during a large demonstration which was strongly opposed by supporters of the Centre-Right coalition. In 2001 Taviani celebrated the first Memorial Day in Italy remembering the mass extermination of Jews at the "Via Tasso" Museum.

=== From the post-war years to government (1945–1975) ===
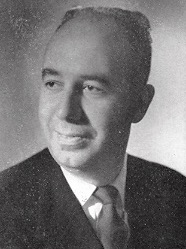
Official portrait of Taviani as a member of the Chamber of Deputies, 1963

Immediately after the war, Taviani became involved in the task of transforming the monarchy into a republic. Appointed to the Consulta he was later elected to the Constituent Council where he drafted the articles regarding property in the Constitution of the Italian Republic (arts. 41–45 in the final text). In the elections from 1948 to 1976 Taviani always managed to obtain the most votes among the deputies elected from Liguria. From 1947 to 1950 he was first Vice-secretary, then National Political Secretary of the Christian Democratic Party. In the party he always supported the secular basis that De Gasperi had wanted. In 1950 Taviani was head of the Italian delegation in Paris for the Schumann Plan, the first major step towards a united Europe.

Undersecretary to De Gasperi at the Ministry of Foreign Affairs (1951), later Minister for Foreign Trade (1953), then again Minister of Defence (from 1953 to 1958), Taviani supported the choice to enter the Atlantic alliance, though always from a pro-European perspective. He was one of the foremost supporters of the ECSC, the EEC and finally the European Union. As Defence Minister he favoured the re-entry of the Federal Republic of Germany into the western Alliance.

From 1953 until 1974 Taviani was minister in every one of Italy's governments. As Minister of the Interior he was active in the struggle against the mafia and effectively countered both the Neo-Fascists (in 1973 he outlawed the far-right organisation Ordine Nuovo) and the Red Brigades. Taviani managed to survive the “death sentences” imposed on him by the OAS, the ON and the BR.

=== Social Christianity, support for NATO, and opening up to the Left ===
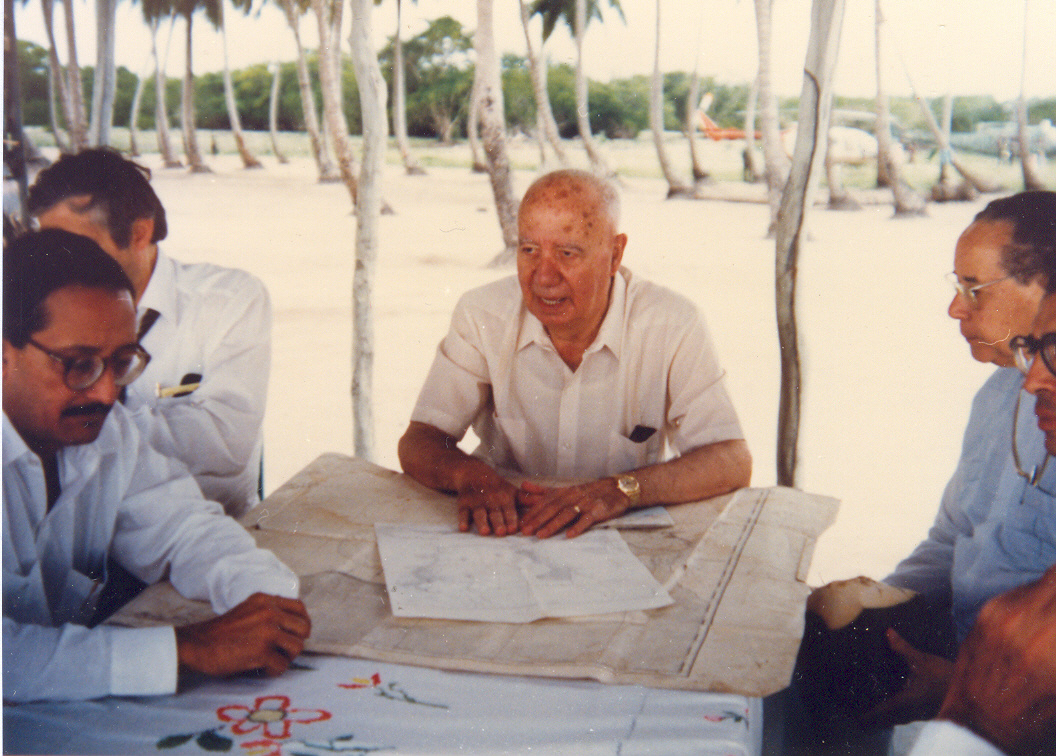
Taviani in Saona Island, 1989

In the eyes of conservatives Taviani's contribution to the Italian Constitution and his book La Proprietà made him appear to be too close to socialist ideas. But during the first years of the cold war Taviani was one of the firmest supporters of NATO which he viewed as the only possible guarantee of Italy's security. This position drew criticism from socialists and communists.

In the early 1960s Taviani favoured an alliance between the Christian Democrats and the Socialist Party in the regional government of Liguria which he later supported for years in national governments. In 1964 he firmly refused to accept a proposal by Italy's President Antonio Segni to head an emergency government as an authoritarian crack down on the communists. In the years that followed Taviani was severely criticised by supporters of the political Right.

After the coup d'état in Chile, Taviani recognised the change that took place in the Italian Communist Party (PCI) under Enrico Berlinguer. During his final period as Minister of the Interior he expressed appreciation of the aid the PCI provided in countering illegal armed organisations (both from the Right and Left wings). By the end of 1974 Taviani's position within the Christian Democratic Party had become difficult because many felt he was too far to the Left. Taviani refused offers to compromise and thereafter only accepted institutional appointments but never again took up a post in the government.

=== Senator ===
From 1976 to 1987 Taviani was elected senator of the Italian Republic in Liguria. From 1979 he was President of the Senate's Foreign Affairs Committee. In 1991 he was appointed “Senator for Life” for “social, literary and scholarly merit”. After the dissolution of the Christian Democratic Party Taviani became a member of the new Italian People's Party (in the Centre-Left coalition). In one of his final interviews he expressed the hope that the PPI would join the European social democratic group.

== Ideology ==
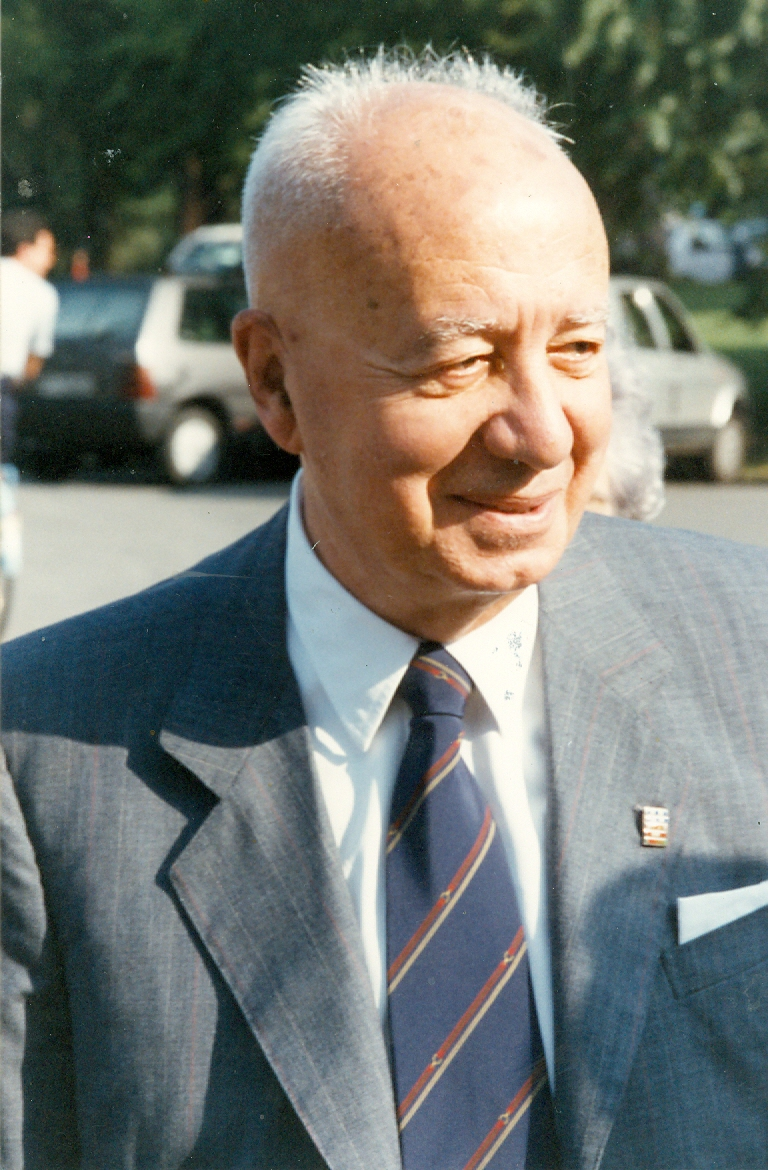
Taviani in Rome

=== Economics ===
Taviani's economic thought belongs to a current of Christian Socialism. His critical studies of Marx, Pareto, Smith and Ricardo were influenced by Maritain, Blondel and Mounier. After an interest in his youth for corporativist theories, Taviani developed the idea of a “mixed” economy, a “third way” which would be capable of promoting social justice while getting beyond the opposition between capitalism and socialism. An important event for Taviani was his participation in the drafting of the Codice di Camaldoli, 99 propositions that had been conceived to orient the activities of Catholics in the social, economic and political spheres. Of particular note among Taviani's economic studies are Problemi economici nei riformatori sociali del Risorgimento italiano; Utilità, economia e morale; Il concetto di utilità nella teoria economica.

Taviani taught the History of Economic Doctrines at the University of Genoa from 1961 to 1986. From 1950 to 1995 Taviani was editor of the journal Civitas which dealt with topics related to economics, contemporary history and international politics.

== Personal life ==
=== Historian of Christopher Columbus ===
Taviani's first publications on Christopher Columbus date back to 1932. But it was in the second half of the 1970s that research on Columbus absorbed a large part of his time. Taviani has left approximately 200 publications on Christopher Columbus (these have been translated English, French, Spanish, German, Portuguese, Hungarian, Turkish, Vietnamese, etc.).). There are two major works: Christopher Columbus. The grand design (1974, ing. ed. 1985) and The voyages of Columbus (1984, ing. ed. 1991). Taviani wrote them by combining a study of primary and secondary sources with a direct geographic analysis of all the places Columbus reached. Taviani compared the various interpretations, pointed out those that were most reliable, provided some new insights and left the field open to further hypotheses whenever it was not possible to overcome any reasonable doubt. He dialogued with scholars from Italy and abroad and managed to achieve a nearly unanimous consensus on a few firm points of historiography.

From the second half of the 1980s Taviani was president of the Scientific Committee for the "Nuova Raccolta Colombiana" (22 works by the most important scholars from Italy and abroad) and he also took part in organising celebrations marking the 500th Anniversary of the Columbus’ discoveries in 1992. His definitive work on the subject appeared in 1996 which summarised and updated all the previous works: Christopher Columbus (three volumes published by the Italian Geographic Society).

=== Private life ===
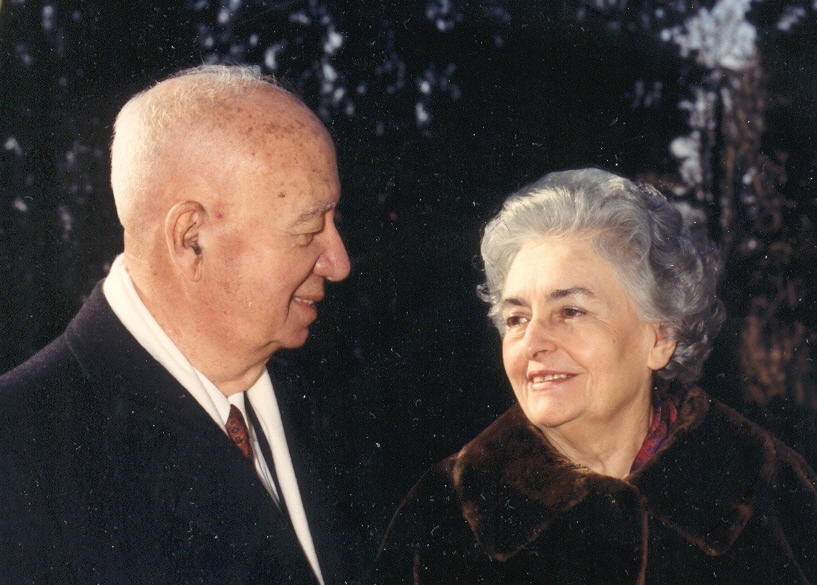
Taviani with his wife Vittoria Festa

Taviani moved to Rome after the war and lived there for the rest of his life. For purposes of study, institutional postings or simply out of passion, from his youth Taviani made countless trips, visiting every continent, especially the countries of Latin America. Still he always retained close ties to his native Liguria. Every year he spent long periods near Bávari (a suburb of Genoa) in his parents’ modest country house. He was especially fond of the small mountain villages in the upper Val Trebbia where he had seen the Resistance grow against the Nazis and Fascists.

In January 1941 Taviani married Vittoria Festa whom he had met at the University of Genoa: after more than sixty years of marriage they had eight children and twenty grandchildren.

=== Death ===
Taviani appeared for the last time on the Italian political stage on 30 May 2001, when he presided as senior member of the Senate's inaugural session. A few days later he suffered a stroke and died in Rome in the early morning of 18 June. His memoirs came out a few weeks later: Politica a memoria d’uomo. He is buried in Bávari.

== Electoral history ==
Election	House	Constituency	Party	Votes	Result
1946	Constituent Assembly	Genoa–Imperia–La Spezia–Savona	DC	28,847	Elected
1948	Chamber of Deputies	Genoa–Imperia–La Spezia–Savona	DC	53,079	Elected
1953	Chamber of Deputies	Genoa–Imperia–La Spezia–Savona	DC	51,989	Elected
1958	Chamber of Deputies	Genoa–Imperia–La Spezia–Savona	DC	82,649	Elected
1963	Chamber of Deputies	Genoa–Imperia–La Spezia–Savona	DC	74,138	Elected
1968	Chamber of Deputies	Genoa–Imperia–La Spezia–Savona	DC	95,192	Elected
1972	Chamber of Deputies	Genoa–Imperia–La Spezia–Savona	DC	98,289	Elected
1976	Senate of the Republic	Liguria – Chiavari	DC	53,755	Elected
1979	Senate of the Republic	Liguria – Chiavari	DC	50,539	Elected
1983	Senate of the Republic	Liguria – Chiavari	DC	42,573	Elected
1987	Senate of the Republic	Liguria – Chiavari	DC	44,862	Elected

== Bibliography ==
- Problemi economici nei riformatori sociali del Risorgimento italiano, Milano: Ancora, 1940; Firenze: Le Monnier, 1968.
- Prospettive sociali, Milano: Istituto di propaganda libraria, 1943, 1945.
- Breve storia dell’insurrezione di Genova, Firenze: Le Monnier, 1945 (12 ed. 1995).
- La Proprietà, Roma: Edizioni Studium, 1946.
- Utilità, Economia e morale, Milano: Istituto di propaganda libraria, 1946; Firenze: Le Monnier, 1970.
- Il Piano Schuman, Roma: Ministero Affari Esteri, 1953; 1954.
- Solidarietà atlantica e comunità europea, Firenze: Le Monnier, 1954; 1967.
- Principi cristiani e metodo democratico, Firenze: Le Monnier, 1965; 1972.
- Il concetto di utilità nella teoria economica, voll. 1–2, Firenze: Le Monnier, 1968–1970; 1973.
- Sì alle Regioni, Roma: Edizioni Civitas, 1970.
- Cristoforo Colombo. La genesi della grande scoperta, voll. 1–2, Novara: De Agostini, 1974; 1988 (inglish trans.).
- Terre di Liguria, Roma: Editalia, 1977.
- "La guerra dei cento fronti", in Civitas, 34.1 (1983), pp. 5–9.
- I viaggi di Colombo. La grande scoperta, voll. 1–2, Novara: De Agostini, 1984; 1990 (inglish trans.).
- ‘Presentazione’, in A. Paladini, Via Tasso. Museo Storico della Liberazione di Roma, Roma: Istituto poligrafico dello Stato, 1986, pp. 5–7.
- C. Colombo, Il giornale di bordo, tomi 1–2, a cura di P.E. Taviani e C. Varela (‘Nuova raccolta colombiana’, 1), Roma: Istituto poligrafico dello Stato, 1988 (inglish trans.).
- Pittaluga racconta, Genova: Ecig, 1988; Bologna: Il Mulino, 1999.
- La meravigliosa avventura di Cristoforo Colombo, Novara: De Agostini, 1989; = L’avventura di Cristoforo Colombo, Bologna: Il Mulino, 2001 (tradotto in spagnolo, tedesco, ungherese, vietnamita, Turco).
- F. Colombo, Le Historie della vita e dei fatti dell’ammiraglio don Cristoforo Colombo, tomi 1–2, a cura di P.E. Taviani e I.L. Caraci, (‘Nuova raccolta colombiana’, 8), Roma: Istituto Poligrafico dello Stato, 1990 (inglish trans.).
- C. Colombo, Relazioni e lettere sul secondo, terzo e quarto viaggio, tomi 1–2, a cura di P.E. Taviani e C. Varela, J. Gil, M. Conti (‘Nuova raccolta colombiana’, 2), Roma: Istituto poligrafico dello Stato, 1992 (inglish trans.).
- C. Colombo, Lettere e scritti, tomo 2, a cura di P.E. Taviani e C. Varela (‘Nuova raccolta colombiana’, 3.2), Roma: Istituto poligrafico dello Stato, 1993.
- “La questione dell’ordine pubblico (1976-1979)”, in Il Parlamento italiano. 22, Milano: Nuova Cei, 1993, pp. 95–125.
- I Giorni di Trieste, Roma: Edizioni Civitas, 1994; Bologna: Il Mulino, 1998.
- Cristoforo Colombo, voll. 1–3, Roma: Società Geografica Italiana, 1996 (inglish trans.).
- Politica a memoria d’uomo, Bologna: Il Mulino, Bologna, 2001.
- Discorsi parlamentari, Bologna: Il Mulino, 2005.

Political offices
Preceded by Ugo La Malfa	Minister of Foreign Trade; 1947–1949	Succeeded by Costantino Bresciani Turroni
Preceded by Giuseppe Codacci Pisanelli	Minister of Defence; 1953–1958	Succeeded by Antonio Segni
Preceded by Luigi Preti	Minister of Finance; 1959–1960	Succeeded by Giuseppe Trabucchi
Preceded by Fernando Tambroni	Minister of Treasury; 1960–1962	Succeeded by Roberto Tremelloni
Preceded by Mario Scelba	Minister of the Interior; 1962–1963	Succeeded by Mariano Rumor
Preceded by Mariano Rumor	Minister of the Interior; 1963–1968	Succeeded by Franco Restivo
Preceded by Francesco De Martino	Deputy Prime Minister of Italy; 1969–1970	Succeeded by Francesco De Martino
Preceded by Antonio Giolitti	Minister of Budget; 1972–1973	Succeeded by Antonio Giolitti
Preceded by Mariano Rumor	Minister of the Interior; 1973–1974	Succeeded by Luigi Gui
Party political offices
Preceded by Giuseppe Cappi	Secretary of the Christian Democracy; 1949–1950	Succeeded by Guido Gonella
