= Silvio Gava =

Italian jurist and politician (1901–1999)

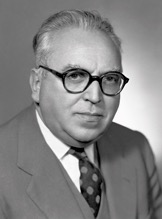
Silvio Gava

Silvio Gava (25 April 1901 in Vittorio Veneto – 23 December 1999 in Rome) was an Italian politician who was one of the founders of the Christian Democracy Party. He hailed from a family based in Naples. He was a lawyer by profession.

Gava became part of the Christian Democracy Party's national directorate in 1944. He was elected to the Italian Senate in 1948. He held several government posts 13 times between 1948 and 1975, including minister of grace and justice, minister of treasury and minister of industry and commerce. From 1969 to 1974 Gava was the head of Christian Democracy Party's senatorial group.

Gava's son, Antonio Gava, was also a politician from the Christian Democracy Party and served in various ministerial posts. Silvio Gava was the author of several books, one of which is his memoirs published in 1999.
