= Emilio Colombo =

Italian politician (1920–2013)

Senator for life Emilio Colombo
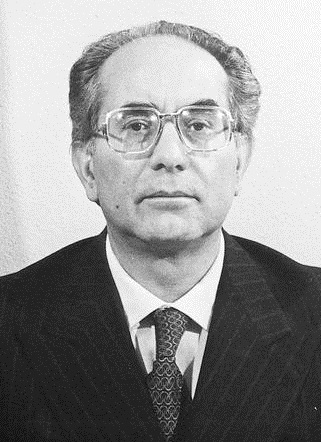

Prime Minister of Italy
- In office 6 August 1970 – 18 February 1972
- President: Giuseppe Saragat; Giovanni Leone
- Deputy: Francesco De Martino
- Preceded by: Mariano Rumor
- Succeeded by: Giulio Andreotti

12th President of the European Parliament
- In office 8 March 1977 – 17 July 1979
- Preceded by: Georges Spénale
- Succeeded by: Simone Veil
Ministerial offices
Minister of Foreign Affairs
In office 1 August 1992 – 28 April 1993
Prime Minister	Giuliano Amato
Preceded by	Vincenzo Scotti
Succeeded by	Beniamino Andreatta
In office 4 April 1980 – 4 August 1983
Prime Minister	Arnaldo Forlani; Giovanni Spadolini; Amintore Fanfani
Preceded by	Attilio Ruffini
Succeeded by	Giulio Andreotti
Minister of Finance
In office 13 April 1988 – 23 July 1989
Prime Minister	Ciriaco De Mita
Preceded by	Antonio Gava
Succeeded by	Rino Formica
Minister of the Budget
In office 29 July 1987 – 13 April 1988
Prime Minister	Giovanni Goria
Preceded by	Giovanni Goria
Succeeded by	Amintore Fanfani
In office 25 June 1968 – 13 December 1968
Prime Minister	Giovanni Leone
Preceded by	Giovanni Pieraccini
Succeeded by	Luigi Preti
Minister of the Treasury
In office 15 March 1974 – 30 July 1976
Prime Minister	Mariano Rumor; Aldo Moro
Preceded by	Ugo La Malfa
Succeeded by	Gaetano Stammati
In office 18 February 1972 – 26 June 1972
Prime Minister	Giulio Andreotti
Preceded by	Mario Ferrari Aggradi
Succeeded by	Giovanni Malagodi
In office 22 June 1963 – 6 August 1970
Prime Minister	Giovanni Leone; Aldo Moro; Mariano Rumor
Preceded by	Roberto Tremelloni
Succeeded by	Mario Ferrari Aggradi
Minister of Grace and Justice
In office 6 March 1971 – 17 February 1972
Prime Minister	Himself
Preceded by	Oronzo Reale
Succeeded by	Guido Gonella
Minister of Foreign Trade
In office 2 July 1958 – 16 February 1959
Prime Minister	Amintore Fanfani
Preceded by	Guido Carli
Succeeded by	Rinaldo Del Bo
Minister of Agriculture
In office 6 July 1955 – 2 July 1958
Prime Minister	Antonio Segni; Adone Zoli
Preceded by	Giuseppe Medici
Succeeded by	Mario Ferrari Aggradi
Mayor of Potenza
In office 14 June 1952 – 14 January 1955
Preceded by	Pietro Scognamiglio
Succeeded by	Vincenzo Solimena
Member of the Parliament
Member of the Senate
Life tenure 14 January 2003 – 24 June 2013
Appointed by	Carlo Azeglio Ciampi
Member of the European Parliament
In office 25 July 1989 – 19 July 1994
Constituency	Southern Italy
In office 17 July 1979 – 24 July 1984
Constituency	Southern Italy
Member of the Chamber of Deputies
In office 8 May 1948 – 9 September 1992
Constituency	Potenza–Matera
Member of the Constituent Assembly
In office 25 June 1946 – 31 January 1948
Constituency	Potenza–Matera

Personal details
- Born: 11 April 1920 Potenza, Kingdom of Italy
- Died: 24 June 2013 (aged 93) Rome, Italy
- Party: Christian Democracy
- Height: 1.73 m (5 ft 8 in)
- Education: Sapienza University

Emilio Colombo (Italian: [eˈmiːljo koˈlombo]; 11 April 1920 – 24 June 2013) was an Italian politician. A member of the Christian Democracy party, he served as Prime Minister of Italy from August 1970 to February 1972. In 2003, he was appointed senator for life, a seat he held until his death.

During his long political career, Colombo held many offices in several governments. He served as Minister of Agriculture from 1955 to 1958; Minister of Foreign Trade from 1958 to 1959; Minister of Grace and Justice from 1970 to 1972; Minister of Treasury from 1963 to 1970, in 1962 and from 1974 to 1976; Minister of Budget in 1968 and from 1987 to 1988; Minister of Finance from 1988 to 1989; and Minister of Foreign Affairs from 1980 to 1983 and from 1992 to 1993. A fervent Europeanist, he also served as president of the European Parliament from 1977 to 1979.

== Early life and education ==
Colombo was born in Potenza, Basilicata, on 11 April 1920. He grew up, along with his six brothers, in a middle-class family; his father, Angelo Colombo, was a public administration official, while his mother, Rosa Tordella, was a housewife.

In 1935, he founded the first local section of Catholic Action (AC), a widespread Catholic association and one of the few non-fascist organizations, admitted by the regime of Benito Mussolini. In 1937, Colombo became the president of Potenza's Catholic Action and a member of the National Council of Catholic Action's Youth. In the same year, he obtained the classical lyceum diploma at the high school entitled to Quintus Horatius Flaccus in Potenza.

In 1941, Colombo graduated in law at the Sapienza University of Rome, with a thesis on canon law. On 1 August 1942, he was enrolled and took part in the World War II. In September 1943, after the armistice, Colombo returned to Basilicata, starting his political commitment based on anti-fascist and Christian democratic principles. From 1944 to 1947, he was appointed general secretary of Azione Cattolica's youth wing.

== Political career ==
Colombo entered politics as a member of the Christian Democracy (DC) party in 1943. In the 1946 Italian general election, Colombo was elected to the Constituent Assembly of Italy with nearly 21,000 votes, becoming one of the youngest members of the Italian Parliament. He was elected for the constituency of Potenza–Matera, which would remain his stronghold for all his political career.

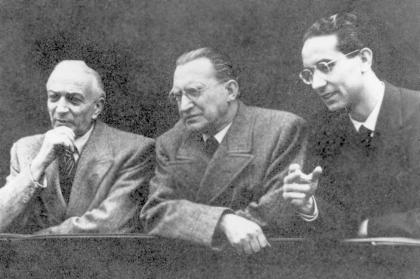
Colombo with Alcide De Gasperi and Antonio Segni in the early 1950s

After two years, in the 1948 Italian general election, Colombo was re-elected in the country's Chamber of Deputies for his constituency with more than 43,000 votes. From May 1948 to July 1951, he was appointed undersecretary to the Ministry of Agriculture and Forests in the 5th and 6th governments of Alcide De Gasperi.

During these years, Colombo was involved in a successful mediation in Calabria in 1949 during clashes for the occupation of the lands by peasants. He also collaborated with Minister Antonio Segni in the approval of the agrarian reform. The land reform, approved by the parliament in October 1950, was financed in part by the funds of the Marshall Plan launched by the United States in 1947 and considered by some scholars as the most important reform of the entire post-war period. The reform proposed, through forced expropriation, the distribution of land to agricultural laborers, thus making them small entrepreneurs and no longer subject to the large landowner. If in some ways the reform had this beneficial result, for others it significantly reduced the size of farms, effectively removing any possibility of transforming them into advanced businesses. This negative element was mitigated and in some cases eliminated by forms of cooperatives.

== Prime Minister of Italy ==
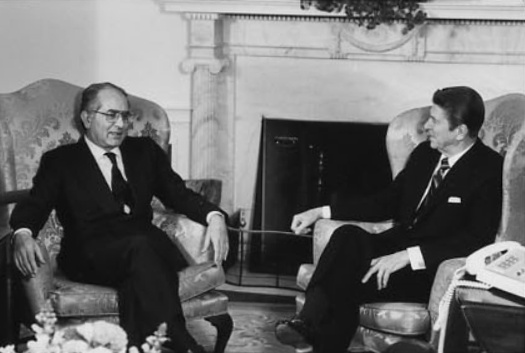
Colombo with Ronald Reagan in 1981

A number of progressive reforms were introduced during Colombo's time as prime minister. A housing reform law began on 22 October 1971.

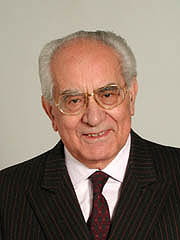
Colombo in 2003

Between 1977 and 1979, Colombo was the president of the European Parliament. From 1980 to 1983 and again from 1992 to 1993, he was the foreign minister of Italy.

== Later life ==
In 2003, then president Carlo Azeglio Ciampi bestowed Italy's highest political honour on him by nominating him senator for life. In the first five years as a lifetime senator, he was an independent politician. From 2008 until his death in June 2013, Colombo was a member of the For the Autonomies group, formed mainly by elects in Trentino-Alto Adige/Südtirol. After the inconclusive 2013 Italian general election and the following difficulties of the Senate of the Republic in electing a presiding officer, Colombo became its provisional president until the election of Pietro Grasso on 16 March 2013. The oldest senator, former prime minister Giulio Andreotti, was due to inaugurate the new legislature, but his unavailability benefited Colombo. After the death of Andreotti on 6 May 2013, Colombo became the last surviving member of the Italian Constituent Assembly.

== Personal life ==
In November 2003, Colombo admitted to having used cocaine for therapeutic purposes over a 12- to 18-month period. He died in Rome on 24 June 2013 at the age of 93.

== Honours and awards ==
- France: Grand Officier of the Legion of Honour
- Iran: Commemorative Medal of the 2,500 year celebration of the Persian Empire
- Italy: Knight of Grand Cross of the Order of Merit of the Italian Republic
- Italy: Grand Cross of the Sacred Military Constantinian Order of Saint George
- EU: Gold Medal of the Jean Monnet Foundation for Europe, 2011

== Electoral history ==
Election	House	Constituency	Party	Votes	Result
1946	Constituent Assembly	Potenza–Matera	DC	20,922	Elected
1948	Chamber of Deputies	Potenza–Matera	DC	43,691	Elected
1953	Chamber of Deputies	Potenza–Matera	DC	54,288	Elected
1958	Chamber of Deputies	Potenza–Matera	DC	88,411	Elected
1963	Chamber of Deputies	Potenza–Matera	DC	79,194	Elected
1968	Chamber of Deputies	Potenza–Matera	DC	103,345	Elected
1972	Chamber of Deputies	Potenza–Matera	DC	117,902	Elected
1976	Chamber of Deputies	Potenza–Matera	DC	90,420	Elected
1979	Chamber of Deputies	Potenza–Matera	DC	90,818	Elected
1979	European Parliament	Southern Italy	DC	860,147	Elected
1983	Chamber of Deputies	Potenza–Matera	DC	105,345	Elected
1987	Chamber of Deputies	Potenza–Matera	DC	105,047	Elected
1989	European Parliament	Southern Italy	DC	364,541	Elected
1992	Chamber of Deputies	Potenza–Matera	DC	31,850	Elected
2001	Senate of the Republic	Basilicata – Potenza	DE	11,298	Not elected
