= Merloni =

- Language: Italian

Merloni is a surname. One of the families bearing this surname is an Italian family, dealing with business. Notable persons with that name include:

- Aristide Merloni (1897–1970), Italian businessman, founder of the Merloni industries
- Clelia Merloni (1861–1930), Italian Roman Catholic professed religious and the founder of the Apostles of the Sacred Heart of Jesus
- Francesco Merloni (1925–2024), Italian businessman and politician
- Lou Merloni (born 1971), American radio personality and baseball player
- Pete Merloni (1904–1967), American professional football player
- Vittorio Merloni (1933–2016), Italian businessman

== See also ==
- Industrie Merloni, former Italian appliance manufacturer
  - Ariston (formerly Merloni TermoSanitari), Italian home appliance manufacturer
  - Indesit (formerly Merloni Elettrodomestici), Italian home appliance manufacturer
