= Ciampi government =

50th government of the Italian Republic

Ciampi Cabinet
- 50th Cabinet of Italy

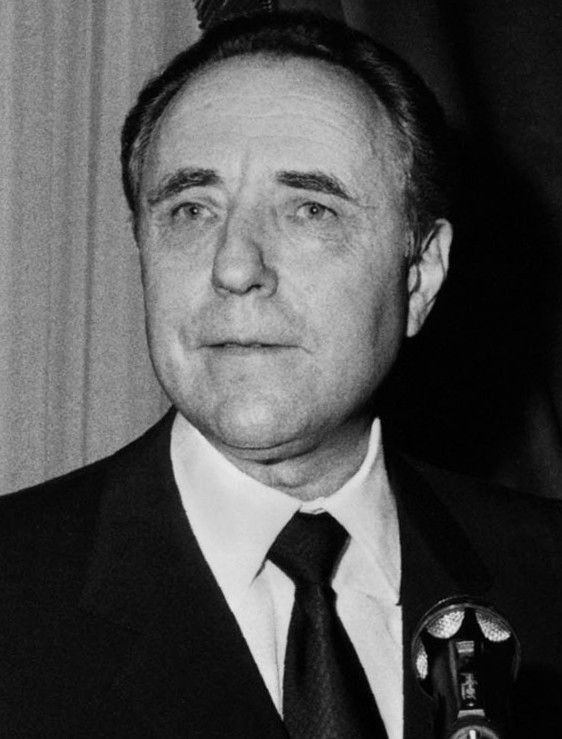
- Date formed: 29 April 1993
- Date dissolved: 11 May 1994 (378 days)

People and organisations
- Head of state: Oscar Luigi Scalfaro
- Head of government: Carlo Azeglio Ciampi
- No. of ministers: 25 (incl. Prime Minister)
- Ministers removed: 6
- Total no. of members: 30 (incl. Prime Minister)
- Member parties: Independents, DC, PSI, PSDI, PLI; Abstention: PDS, LN, PRI, FdV
- Status in legislature: National unity government Technocratic cabinet
- Opposition parties: PRC, MSI, Rete

History
- Outgoing election: 1994 election
- Legislature term: XI Legislature (1992–1994)
- Predecessor: Amato I Cabinet
- Successor: Berlusconi I Cabinet

The Ciampi government, led by Carlo Azeglio Ciampi (the former governor of the Bank of Italy), was the 50th cabinet (Council of Ministers) of the Italian Republic, and the second and final cabinet of the XI Legislature. It held office from 29 April 1993 until 11 May 1994, a total of 378 days, or 1 year and 12 days. Referred to as a governo di scopo ("purpose government" or "limited-purpose government"), it was a transitional government and was also similar to a technocratic government, although it mainly included ministers from political parties.

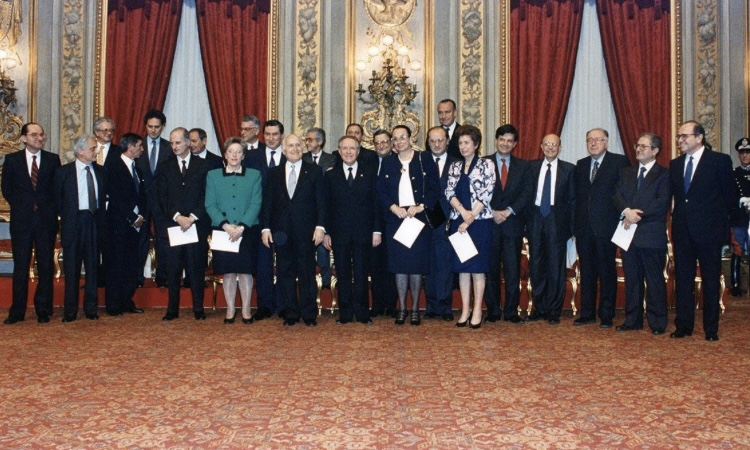
Official photo of the Ciampi government after the oath at the Quirinal Palace

In what was a sort of national unity government, the Ciampi government was the first government of the Italian Republic led by a non-parliamentarian and the last government led by Christian Democracy (DC). Former Italian Communist Party (PCI) members joined the government for the first time since 1947; however, they left the government after a few days.

On 4 May 1993, a few days later the settlement of the government and at the height of Tangentopoli, the Democratic Party of the Left (PDS) and the Federation of the Greens (FdV) withdrew their ministers in protest against the failed authorization to proceed against Italian Socialist Party (PSI) leader Bettino Craxi by the Chamber of Deputies.

The PDS ministers were replaced with independent politicians or experts, and the cabinet obtained the confidence in the Chamber of Deputies on 7 May 1993, with 309 votes in favour, 60 against and 182 abstentions, and in the Senate of the Republic on 12 May 1993, with 162 votes in favour, 36 against and 50 abstentions. The PDS, the Northern League (LN), the Italian Republican Party (PR), and the FdV refrained from voting for confidence in the government. The government resigned on 13 January 1994.

== Party breakdown ==
The government was initially composed of the members of the following parties:

- Independents: Prime Minister, 8 ministers
- Christian Democracy (DC): 8 ministers and 20 undersecretaries
- Italian Socialist Party (PSI): 5 ministers and 10 undersecretaries
- Italian Liberal Party (PLI): 1 minister and 3 undersecretaries
- Italian Democratic Socialist Party (PSDI): 1 minister and 3 undersecretaries
- Italian Republican Party (PRI): 1 undersecretary

Until 4 May 1993, the government was also composed of members of the following parties:

- Democratic Party of the Left (PDS): 3 ministers
- Federation of the Greens (FdV): 1 minister

== Composition ==
Portrait	Office	Name	Term	Party	Undersecretaries
	Prime Minister	Carlo Azeglio Ciampi	29 April 1993 – 11 May 1994	Independent	Antonio Maccanico (PRI) (Note: Secretary of the Council of Ministers); Vito Riggio (DC) (Note: Delegated to the Civil Protection)
	Minister of Foreign Affairs	Beniamino Andreatta	29 April 1993 – 19 April 1994	Christian Democracy	Carmelo Azzarà (DC); Giuseppe Giacovazzo (DC); Laura Fincato (PSI)
	Minister of Foreign Affairs	Leopoldo Elia	19 April 1994 – 11 May 1994	Christian Democracy	Carmelo Azzarà (DC); Giuseppe Giacovazzo (DC); Laura Fincato (PSI)
	Minister of the Interior	Nicola Mancino	29 April 1993 – 19 April 1994	Christian Democracy	Antonino Murmura (DC); Saverio D'Aquino (PLI); Costantino Dell'Osso (PSI)
	Minister of the Interior	Carlo Azeglio Ciampi (ad interim)	19 April 1994 – 11 May 1994	Independent	Antonino Murmura (DC); Saverio D'Aquino (PLI); Costantino Dell'Osso (PSI)
	Minister of Justice	Giovanni Conso	29 April 1993 – 11 May 1994	Independent	Vincenzo Binetti (DC); Daniela Mazzuconi (DC)
	Minister of Budget and Economic Planning	Luigi Spaventa	29 April 1993 – 11 May 1994	Independent	Luigi Grillo (DC); Florindo D'Aimmo (DC)
	Minister of Finance	Vincenzo Visco	29 April 1993 – 4 May 1993	Democratic Party of the Left	Stefano De Luca (PLI); Riccardo Triglia (DC); Antonio Pappalardo (PSDI) (until 22 May 1993); Paolo Bruno (PSDI) (since 14 June 1993)
	Minister of Finance	Franco Gallo	5 May 1993 – 11 May 1994	Independent	Stefano De Luca (PLI); Riccardo Triglia (DC); Antonio Pappalardo (PSDI) (until 22 May 1993); Paolo Bruno (PSDI) (since 14 June 1993)
	Minister of Treasury	Piero Barucci	29 April 1993 – 11 May 1994	Christian Democracy	Paolo De Paoli (PSDI); Piergiovanni Malvestio (DC); Maurizio Sacconi (PSI); Sergio Coloni (DC)
	Minister of Defence	Fabio Fabbri	29 April 1993 – 11 May 1994	Italian Socialist Party	Antonio Giagu Demartini (DC); Antonio Patuelli (PLI)
	Minister of Public Education	Rosa Russo Jervolino	29 April 1993 – 11 May 1994	Christian Democracy	Giuseppe Matulli (DC); Antonio Mario Innamorato (PSI)
	Minister of Public Works	Francesco Merloni	29 April 1993 – 11 May 1994	Christian Democracy	Achille Cutrera (PSI); Pino Pisicchio (DC)
	Minister of Agriculture and Forests	Alfredo Luigi Diana	29 April 1993 – 11 May 1994	Christian Democracy	Pasquale Diglio (PSI)
	Minister of Post and Telecommunications	Maurizio Pagani	29 April 1993 – 11 May 1994	Italian Democratic Socialist Party	Ombretta Fumagalli Carulli (DC)
	Minister of Industry, Commerce and Craftsmanship	Paolo Savona	29 April 1993 – 19 April 1994	Independent	Germano De Cinque (DC); Rossella Artioli (PSI)
	Minister of Industry, Commerce and Craftsmanship	Paolo Baratta (ad interim)	19 April 1994 – 11 May 1994	Independent	Germano De Cinque (DC); Rossella Artioli (PSI)
	Minister of Health	Mariapia Garavaglia	29 April 1993 – 11 May 1994	Christian Democracy	Nicola Savino (PSI); Publio Fiori (DC)
	Minister of Foreign Trade	Paolo Baratta	29 April 1993 – 11 May 1994	Independent	
	Minister of Transport and Navigation	Raffaele Costa	29 April 1993 – 11 May 1994	Italian Liberal Party	Giorgio Carta (PSDI); Michele Sellitti (PSI)
	Minister of Labour and Social Security	Gino Giugni	29 April 1993 – 11 May 1994	Italian Socialist Party	Luciano Azzolini (DC); Sandro Principe (PSI)
	Minister of Tourism and Entertainment	Carlo Azeglio Ciampi (ad interim)	29 April 1993 – 11 May 1994	Independent	
	Minister of Cultural and Environmental Heritage	Alberto Ronchey	29 April 1993 – 11 May 1994	Independent	
	Minister of the Environment	Francesco Rutelli	29 April 1993 – 4 May 1993	Federation of the Greens	Roberto Formigoni (DC)
	Minister of the Environment	Valdo Spini	4 May 1993 – 11 May 1994	Italian Socialist Party	Roberto Formigoni (DC)
	Minister of University and Scientific and Technological Research	Luigi Berlinguer	29 April 1993 – 4 May 1993	Democratic Party of the Left	Silvia Costa (DC)
	Minister of University and Scientific and Technological Research	Umberto Colombo	4 May 1993 – 11 May 1994	Independent	Silvia Costa (DC)
	Minister of Public Function (without portfolio)	Sabino Cassese	29 April 1993 – 11 May 1994	Independent	
	Minister for the Coordination of Community Policies (without portfolio)	Valdo Spini	29 April 1993 – 4 May 1993	Italian Socialist Party	
	Minister for the Coordination of Community Policies (without portfolio)	Livio Paladin	4 May 1993 – 11 May 1994	Independent	
	Minister for Social Affairs (without portfolio)	Fernanda Contri	29 April 1993 – 11 May 1994	Italian Socialist Party	
	Minister for Parliamentary Relations (without portfolio)	Augusto Barbera	29 April 1993 – 4 May 1993	Democratic Party of the Left	
	Minister for Parliamentary Relations (without portfolio)	Paolo Barile	4 May 1993 – 11 May 1994	Independent	
	Minister for Electoral and Institutional Reforms (without portfolio)	Leopoldo Elia	29 April 1993 – 11 May 1994	Christian Democracy	

== See also ==
- Technocratic government (Italy)
