= First Amato government =

49th government of the Italian Republic

Amato I Cabinet
- 49th Cabinet of Italy

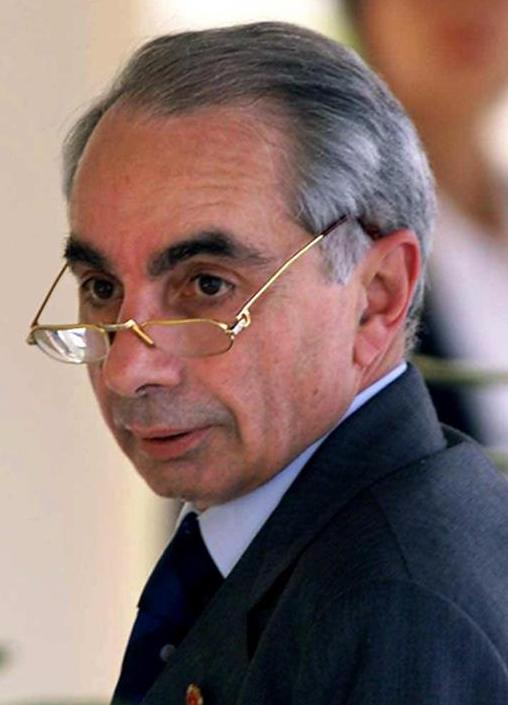
- Date formed: 28 June 1992
- Date dissolved: 29 April 1993 (306 days)

People and organisations
- Head of state: Oscar Luigi Scalfaro
- Head of government: Giuliano Amato
- No. of ministers: 21 (incl. Prime Minister)
- Ministers removed: 7
- Total no. of members: 28 (incl. Prime Minister)
- Member parties: DC, PSI, PSDI, PLI
- Status in legislature: Coalition government Quadripartito
- Opposition parties: PDS, LN, PRC, PRI, MSI, FdV, Rete

History
- Election: 1992 election
- Legislature term: XI Legislature (1992–1994)
- Predecessor: Andreotti VII Cabinet
- Successor: Ciampi Cabinet

The Amato I Cabinet was the 49th cabinet of the Italian Republic, and the first cabinet of the XI Legislature. It held office from 28 June 1992 until 28 April 1993, a total of 304 days, or 10 months.

The cabinet obtained the confidence of the Senate on 2 July 1992 with 173 votes in favour and 140 against. It obtained the confidence of the Chamber of Deputies on 4 July 1992 with 330 votes in favour, 280 against and 2 abstentions. The number of the ministries were reduced to 24 from 32. The government resigned on 22 April 1993.

== Party breakdown ==
=== Beginning of term ===
- Italian Socialist Party (PSI): Prime minister, 7 ministers, 11 undersecretaries
- Christian Democracy (DC): 12 ministers, 18 undersecretaries
- Italian Liberal Party (PLI): 2 ministers, 3 undersecretaries
- Italian Democratic Socialist Party (PSDI): 2 ministers, 3 undersecretaries
- Independents: 2 ministers

=== End of term ===
- Italian Socialist Party (PSI): Prime minister, 3 ministers, 11 undersecretaries
- Christian Democracy (DC): 13 ministers, 18 undersecretaries
- Italian Liberal Party (PLI): 2 ministers, 3 undersecretaries
- Italian Democratic Socialist Party (PSDI): 2 ministers, 3 undersecretaries
- Independents: 3 ministers

== Composition ==
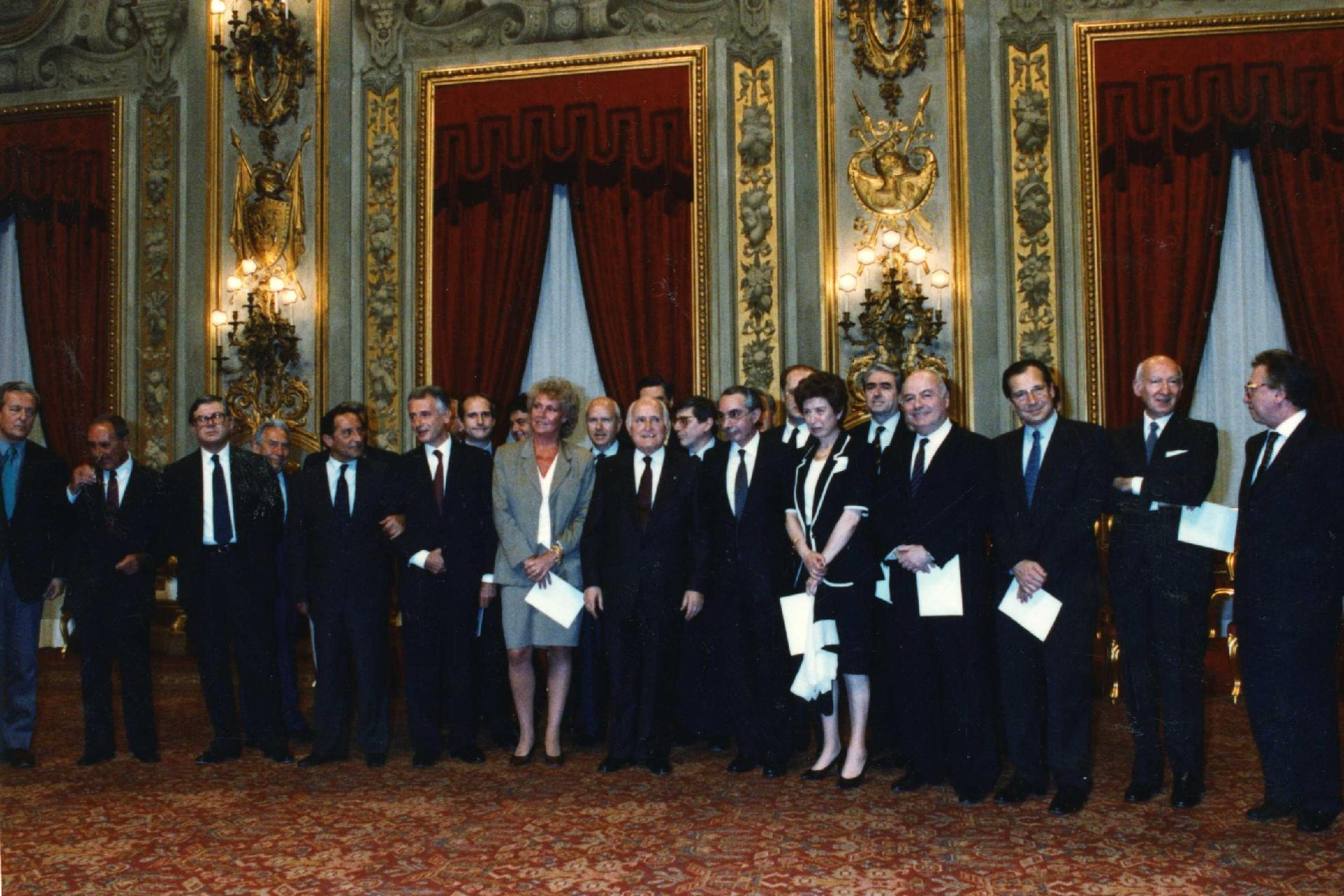
Official photo of the Amato's government after the oath at the Quirinal Palace

| Portfolio | Minister | Took office | Left office | Party |
|---|---|---|---|---|
| Prime Minister | Giuliano Amato | 28 June 1992 | 29 April 1993 | PSI |
| Minister of Foreign Affairs | Vincenzo Scotti | 28 June 1992 | 29 July 1992 | DC |
| Minister of Foreign Affairs | Giuliano Amato (ad interim) | 29 July 1992 | 1 August 1992 | PSI |
| Minister of Foreign Affairs | Emilio Colombo | 1 August 1992 | 29 April 1993 | DC |
| Minister of the Interior | Nicola Mancino | 28 June 1992 | 29 April 1993 | DC |
| Minister of Grace and Justice | Claudio Martelli | 28 June 1992 | 10 February 1993 | PSI |
| Minister of Grace and Justice | Giovanni Conso | 10 February 1993 | 29 April 1993 | Independent |
| Minister of Defence | Salvo Andò | 28 June 1992 | 29 April 1993 | PSI |
| Minister of Budget and Economic Planning | Franco Reviglio | 28 June 1992 | 21 February 1993 | PSI |
| Minister of Budget and Economic Planning | Beniamino Andreatta | 21 February 1993 | 29 April 1993 | DC |
| Minister of Finance | Giovanni Goria | 28 June 1992 | 19 February 1993 | DC |
| Minister of Finance | Franco Reviglio | 19 February 1993 | 30 March 1993 | PSI |
| Minister of Finance | Giuliano Amato (ad interim) | 30 March 1993 | 29 April 1993 | PSI |
| Minister of Treasury | Piero Barucci | 28 June 1992 | 29 April 1993 | DC |
| Minister for Agriculture and Forests | Giovanni Angelo Fontana | 28 June 1992 | 21 March 1993 | DC |
| Minister for Agriculture and Forests | Alfredo Luigi Diana | 22 March 1993 | 29 April 1993 | DC |
| Minister of Public Works | Francesco Merloni | 28 June 1992 | 29 April 1993 | DC |
| Minister of Transport | Giancarlo Tesini | 28 June 1992 | 29 April 1993 | DC |
| Minister of Merchant Navy | Giancarlo Tesini (ad interim) | 28 June 1992 | 29 April 1993 | DC |
| Minister of State Holdings | Giuseppe Guarino | 28 June 1992 | 29 April 1993 | DC |
| Minister of Industry, Commerce and Craftsmanship | Giuseppe Guarino (ad interim) | 28 June 1992 | 29 April 1993 | DC |
| Minister of Foreign Trade | Claudio Vitalone | 28 June 1992 | 29 April 1993 | DC |
| Minister of Post and Telecommunications | Maurizio Pagani | 28 June 1992 | 29 April 1993 | PSDI |
| Minister of Health | Francesco De Lorenzo | 28 June 1992 | 21 February 1993 | PLI |
| Minister of Health | Raffaele Costa | 21 February 1993 | 29 April 1993 | PLI |
| Minister of Labour and Social Security | Nino Cristofori | 28 June 1992 | 29 April 1993 | DC |
| Minister of Cultural and Environmental Heritage | Alberto Ronchey | 28 June 1992 | 29 April 1993 | Independent |
| Minister of the Environment | Carlo Ripa di Meana | 28 June 1992 | 7 March 1993 | PSI |
| Minister of the Environment | Valdo Spini | 7 March 1993 | 29 April 1993 | PSI |
| Minister of Public Education | Rosa Russo Jervolino | 28 June 1992 | 29 April 1993 | DC |
| Minister of University and Scientific and Technological Research | Alessandro Fontana | 28 June 1992 | 29 April 1993 | DC |
| Minister of Tourism and Entertainment | Margherita Boniver | 28 June 1992 | 29 April 1993 | PSI |
| Minister without portfolio (Social Affairs) | Adriano Bompiani | 28 June 1992 | 29 April 1993 | DC |
| Minister without portfolio (Urban Area) | Carmelo Conte | 28 June 1992 | 29 April 1993 | PSI |
| Minister without portfolio (Community Policies and Regional Affairs) | Raffaele Costa | 28 June 1992 | 21 February 1993 | PLI |
| Minister without portfolio (Community Policies and Regional Affairs) | Gianfranco Ciaurro | 21 February 1993 | 29 April 1993 | PLI |
| Minister without portfolio (Coordination of Civil Protection) | Ferdinando Facchiano | 28 June 1992 | 29 April 1993 | PSDI |
| Minister without portfolio (Restructuring of State Holdings) | Paolo Baratta | 21 February 1993 | 29 April 1993 | Independent |
| Secretary to the Council of Ministers | Fabio Fabbri | 28 June 1992 | 29 April 1993 | PSI |
