= Sabino Cassese =

Italian professor and former judge (born 1935)

Sabino Cassese OMRI
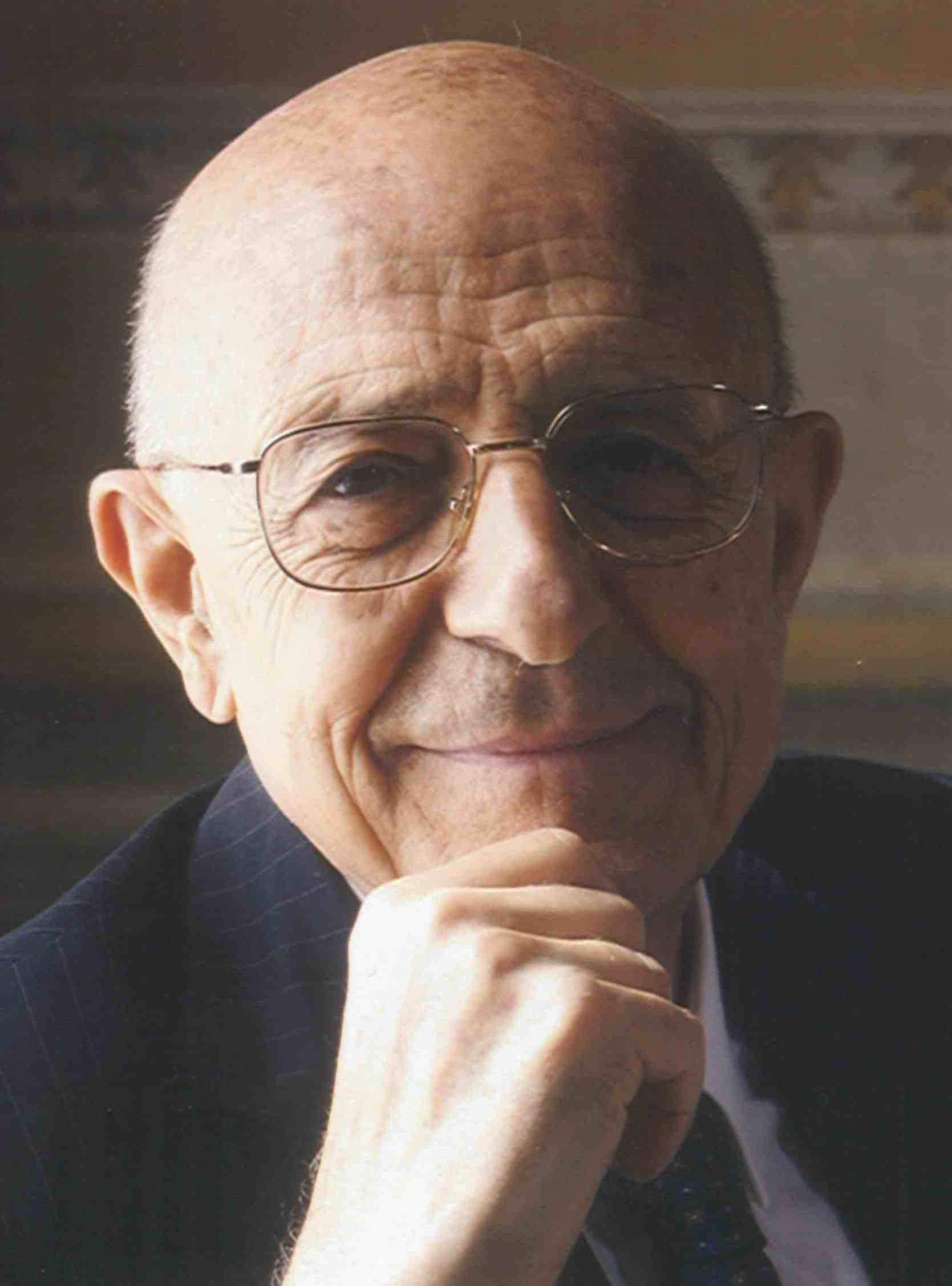
- Cassese in 1992

Judge of the Constitutional Court of Italy
- In office 9 November 2005 – 9 November 2014
- Appointed by: Carlo Azeglio Ciampi
- Preceded by: Fernanda Contri
- Succeeded by: Daria de Pretis

Minister for Public Function
- In office 29 April 1993 – 11 May 1994
- Prime Minister: Carlo Azeglio Ciampi
- Preceded by: Remo Gaspari
- Succeeded by: Giuliano Urbani

Personal details
- Born: 20 October 1935 (age 90) Atripalda, Italy
- Spouse: Rita Perez
- Children: 2
- Relatives: Antonio Cassese (brother)
- Education: University of Pisa

Sabino Cassese OMRI (born 20 October 1935) is an Italian jurist, former minister for the public function in the Ciampi government (1993–1994), and judge of the Constitutional Court of Italy (2005–2014).

== Education and career ==
Justice Emeritus of the Italian Constitutional Court and Emeritus professor at the Scuola Normale Superiore of Pisa. He teaches at the Luiss University - School of Government, Rome.

Cassese graduated (October 1956) summa cum laude in law from the University of Pisa, where he also studied (1952–1956) at the prestigious Collegio Medico-Giuridico of the Scuola Normale Superiore (which in 1987 changed its name to Sant'Anna School of Advanced Studies). He was an assistant professor at the Universities of Pisa and Rome and, since 1961, has served as a professor at the Universities of Urbino, Naples and Rome. He has been a member of many ministerial committees and of the governing body of the Italian Central Statistical Office. From 1975 to 1983 he taught at the Advanced School for the Civil Service (Rome). In 1993–94 he was a member of the Italian Government.

Cassese has received a doctor honoris causa degree from eight universities: Aix-en-Provence (1987), Cordoba (1995), Panthéon-Assas (1998), Castilla-La Mancha (2002), Athens (2002), Macerata (2002), European University Institute of Florence (2010) and Roma La Sapienza (2016).

He was president of the European Group of Public Administration (International Institute of Administrative Sciences) from 1987 to 1991; a visiting scholar at Berkeley (1965), London (1969), Stanford (1970, 1975, 1986) and Oxford (1987, 1988, 1989, 1995); professeur associé at the Universities of Panthéon-Sorbonne (1986, 1994, 1995, 1999), Nantes (1987) and at the Institut d'Etudes Politiques – Paris (1991); guest scholar Wilson Center, Washington (1983); professor at the Hauser Global Law School of the New York University (2004 and 2010), and from 2005 professor at the Master of Public Affairs of the Paris Institut d'Etudes Politiques. Since 2010 he is also a professor at the Master in International Public Affairs of the LUISS School of Government, and since 2011, a visiting professor at the LL.M. Law in a European and Global Context of the Católica Global School of Law, in Lisbon.

He is considered one of the leading experts in administrative law, but he has also carried out research in administrative history and legal thought, science of administration, public law of economics, comparative law and global administrative law. Since 1973, he has been a member and president of numerous study committees of national and international research institutions.

In 2004, together with some of his scholars, he founded the Institute for Research on Public Administration(IRPA), based in Rome.

Now he is Professor Emeritus at Scuola Normale Superiore di Pisa where he teaches History of Political Institution. As of September 2020, he is a member of the Italian Aspen Institute.

In 1994, Cassese was appointed a Knight Grand Cross of the Order of Merit of the Italian Republic (OMRI).

== Publications ==
Among his publications:

- La construction du droit administratif (2000, Montchrestien);
- Portrait de l’Italie actuelle (2001, La Documentation Française; trad. it. Ritratto dell’Italia, 2001, Laterza);
- La crisi dello Stato (2001, Laterza);
- Is There Really a 'Democratic Deficit?' in “Institutional reforms in the European Union – Memorandum for the Convention” (2002, Europeos);
- Lo spazio giuridico globale (2003, Laterza);
- The Age of Administrative Reforms, in “Governing Europe” (2003, J. Hayward-A. Menon, eds., Oxford Univ. Press);
- The Italian Legal System 1945-1999, in “Legal Culture in the Age of Globalization” (2003, L.M. Friedman-R. Perez Perdomo, eds., Stanford Univ. Press);
- Trattato di diritto amministrativo (editor) (2003, II ed., Giuffrè);
- La Nuova Costituzione Economica (V ed. 2012, Laterza);
- European Administrative Proceedings in « Law and Contemporary Problems » (2004, vol. 68, n. 1);
- Istituzioni di diritto amministrativo (editor) (IV ed., 2012, Giuffrè);
- Manuale di diritto pubblico (V ed., 2014, Giuffrè);
- Global standards for national administrative procedure, in « Law and Contemporary Problems » (2005, vol. 68, nn. 3-4);
- Dizionario di diritto pubblico (editor) (2006, Giuffrè);
- Oltre lo Stato (2006, Laterza);
- Global Administrative Law: An Introduction in « Journal of International Law and Politics » (2005, Summer, vol. 37, n. 4, p. 663-694);
- The Globalization of Law, in « Journal of International Law and Politics » (2005, Summer, vol. 37, n. 4, p. 973-993);
- La partecipazione dei privati alle decisioni pubbliche. Saggio di diritto comparato in «Rivista trimestrale di diritto pubblico» (2007, fasc. 1, p. 13-41);
- When Legal Orders collide: the Role of Courts (2010, Global Law Press)
- Il diritto globale. Giustizia e democrazia oltre lo Stato (2009, Einaudi);
- Lo Stato fascista (2010, Il Mulino);
- Handbuch Ius Publicum Europaeum (eds. Armin von Bogdandy, Sabino Cassese, Peter M. Huber), (2010, C.F. Mueller);
- Il diritto amministrativo: storia e prospettive (2010, Giuffrè);
- L'Italia: una società senza Stato (2011, Il Mulino);
- The Global Polity – Global Dimensions of Democracy and the Rule of Law (electronic book) (2012, Global Law Press, Editorial Derecho Global);
- The Italian constitutional architecture: from unification to the present day, in “Journal of Modern Studies” (2012, January, vol. 17, n. 1);
- Governare gli italiani: Storia dello stato ( 2014, Il Mulino).
- Dentro la Corte Diario di un giudice costituzionale (2015, il Mulino);
- Territori e potere Un nuovo ruolo per gli Stati? (2016, il Mulino);
- Research Handbook on Global Administrative Law (ed) (2016, Elgar);
- Lezioni sul meridionalismo. Nord e Sud nella storia d'Italia (ed) (2016, il Mulino);
- La democrazia e i suoi limiti (2017, Mondadori);
- The Administrative State with A. von Bogdandy, P. M. Huber (eds) (2017, Oxford University press);
- La democrazia e i suoi limiti. Nuova edizione aggiornata (2018, Mondadori);
- A World government? (2018, Global Law Press);
- I Presidenti della Repubblica, G. Galasso, A. Melloni (eds) (2018, il Mulino);
- La Svolta. Dialoghi sulla politica che cambia (2018, il Mulino);
- Il Popolo e i suoi rappresentanti (2019, Edizioni di storia e letteratura);
- Il Buon governo. L’età dei doveri (2020, Mondadori);
- Una volta il futuro era migliore. Lezioni per invertire la rotta (2021, Solferino);
- Advanced introduction to Global administrative law (2021, Elgar);
- Intellettuali (2021, il Mulino);
- La nuova Costituzione economica (eds) (2021, Laterza);
- Il governo dei giudici (2022, Laterza);
- I presidenti e la presidenza del Consiglio dei ministri nell’Italia repubblicana. Storia, politica, istituzioni, with A. Pajno, A. Melloni (2022, Laterza);
- Amministrare la Nazione (2023, Mondadori).

Political offices
Vacant Title last held by Remo Gaspari	Minister of Public Function; 1993–1994	Succeeded by Giuliano Urbani
Legal offices
Preceded by Fernanda Contri	Judge of the Constitutional Court of Italy; 2005–2014	Succeeded by Daria de Pretis
