= Aristide Merloni =

Italian businessman (1897–1970)

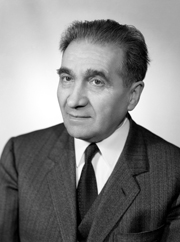
Aristide Merloni

Aristide Merloni (24 October 1897, Fabriano – 19 December 1970, Fabriano), was an Italian businessman, and founder of the Merloni industries. He started his entrepreneurial adventure with the production of scales. In the following decades, he developed a large range of products, from gas cylinders to water heaters, from bathtubs to household appliances and kitchen furniture. From his name, Aristide, the company drew inspiration to create its historical, most famous trademark, Ariston.

Upon his death, the various activities were divided into three companies, one for each one of his sons. Two of these companies are still in business: Ariston Thermo Group and Indesit Company.

== Biography ==
Coming from a family of workers, he attended the "Istituto Tecnico Industriale Statale Montani" in Fermo, from which he graduated in 1916, when he was drafted for the First World War.

When he returned to Albacina (AN), he participated with Lamberto Corsi, Tersilio Fida, Romualdo Castelli, don Agostino Crocetti and don Erminio Petruio in the Catholic trade unions’ and in the Popular Party.

In 1919 Aristide started his career in the entrepreneurial world as a draughtsman in a plant of Pinerolo (Piedmont, Italy) and in ten years he became the general manager of the company. After moving to Piedmont he still maintained his membership in the Popular Party. He got married in 1921 and had four sons: Ester, Francesco, Antonio and Vittorio.

His inspirational principle was always the corporate social responsibility: “There is no value in the economic success of any industrial initiative unless it is accompanied by a commitment to social progress”. Following the social philosophy of the Christian Democrat Party, he believed that in order to realize authentic human and social promotion, industrial and manufacturing development had to take place gradually, without creating rifts in lifestyles and customs, in traditions and values, drawing inspiration from the pragmatic assumption of respect for individuals.

On 20 July 1930, Aristide Merloni set up a small activity in Fabriano for the production of scales, which changed its name to S.A.M.A. (Società Anonima Merloni Aristide) in 1933.

By 1938 the company had grown bigger, with a turnover of 500,000,000 Liras - a value equivalent to approximately 250,000 Euros - and 70 employees. In the fifties, Merloni was the first Italian company in the field of weighing instruments, with a 40% market share.

Aristide Merloni was elected Mayor of Fabriano in 1951 for the Christian Democrat Party. He was confirmed Mayor in 1956 and at the same time elected to the Provincial Council of Ancona. In 1958 he became Senator for the Christian Democrat Party, and was confirmed in 1963 and 1968.

In 1963 in Fabriano, he founded the Aristide Merloni Foundation, Institute for the Economic and Social Development of Marche, which is today a research and study centre. When ENI found methane in the Po Valley, Merloni decided to start the production of cylinders for liquid gas, with the support of his fellow man Enrico Mattei, President of ENI. He set up a plant in Matelica that soon became the leader at the national level.

Diversification, which had already been a key factor of other Italian industrial initiatives, became a guiding principle for Merloni, and at the end of the fifties the production of water heaters, followed by enamelled gas stoves was started.

In thirty years they reached a production of 1,000 stoves a day, with more than 400 workers. In order to compete with leading manufacturers of brands such as Zoppas, Candy, Triplex, Rex and Fargas, Merloni used the Ariston brand, probably inspired by his name.

In 1966 seven plants were created in the Marche region, with a geographical disposition that reminds of the constellation of the Great Bear, in Fabriano, Matelica, Albacina, Genga, Sassoferrato, Cerreto d’Esi and Borgo Tufico.

In 1970 the Merloni industries were a composite mix of activities with a turnover slightly lower than 50 billion Liras, with 3,000 employees and production in 8 different plants.

Upon the death of its founder, which took place in Fabriano on 19 December 1970, the company was reorganized into three autonomous units, Merloni Elettrodomestici (today Indesit Company), directed by Vittorio Merloni, Merloni Termosanitari (today Ariston Thermo Group), directed by Francesco Merloni and the mechanical sector, managed by Antonio Merloni.

== Sources ==
- E. Sori - Merloni: da Fabriano al mondo - Milano, EGEA, 2005
- M. Bartocci, C. Crialesi, E. Sparisci - Aristide Merloni per la sua gente: l'impegno politico e sociale - Urbino, QuattroVenti, c1999
- AA.VV. - Aristide Merloni - Cento Anni 1987-1997 - Conerografica SNC, CAMERANO, 1997
- C. Galliano, D. Pilati, E. Sparisci con interventi di A. Forlani e F. Merloni - Aristide Merloni: l'uomo, il cattolico, l'amministratore - Fabriano, Centro studi Don Giuseppe Riganelli, 1991
- C. Barberis - Aristide Merloni: storia di un uomo e di un'industria in montagna - Bologna, Il Mulino, 1987
