= Second Cossiga government =

37th government of the Italian Republic

Cossiga II Cabinet
- 37th Cabinet of Italy

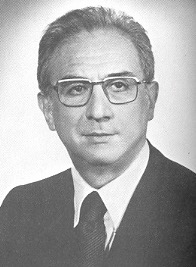
- Date formed: 4 April 1980
- Date dissolved: 18 October 1980

People and organisations
- Head of state: Sandro Pertini
- Head of government: Francesco Cossiga
- Member parties: DC, PSI, PRI
- Status in legislature: Coalition government
- Opposition parties: PCI, MSI, PSDI, PR, PLI, PdUP

History
- Legislature term: VIII Legislature (1979–1983)
- Predecessor: Cossiga I Cabinet
- Successor: Forlani Cabinet

The Cossiga II Cabinet, led by Francesco Cossiga, was the 37th cabinet of the Italian Republic.

It fell due to the rejection of the 1980 Budget by Parliament by secret ballot.

== Party breakdown ==
- Christian Democracy (DC): Prime minister, 15 ministers, 34 undersecretaries
- Italian Socialist Party (PSI): 9 ministers, 18 undersecretaries
- Italian Republican Party (PRI): 3 ministers, 5 undersecretaries

== Composition ==
Portfolio	Minister	Took office	Left office	Party
Prime Minister	Francesco Cossiga	4 April 1980	18 October 1980	DC
Minister of Foreign Affairs	Emilio Colombo	4 April 1980	18 October 1980	DC
Minister of the Interior	Virginio Rognoni	4 April 1980	18 October 1980	DC
Minister of Grace and Justice	Tommaso Morlino	4 April 1980	18 October 1980	DC
Minister of Budget and Economic Planning	Giorgio La Malfa	4 April 1980	18 October 1980	PRI
Minister of Finance	Franco Reviglio	4 April 1980	18 October 1980	PSI
Minister of Treasury	Filippo Maria Pandolfi	4 April 1980	18 October 1980	DC
Minister of Defence	Lelio Lagorio	4 April 1980	18 October 1980	PSI
Minister of Public Education	Adolfo Sarti	4 April 1980	18 October 1980	DC
Minister of Public Works	Francesco Compagna	4 April 1980	18 October 1980	PRI
Minister of Agriculture and Forests	Giovanni Marcora	4 April 1980	18 October 1980	DC
Minister of Transport	Rino Formica	4 April 1980	18 October 1980	PSI
Minister of Post and Telecommunications	Clelio Darida	4 April 1980	18 October 1980	DC
Minister of Industry, Commerce and Craftsmanship	Antonio Bisaglia	4 April 1980	18 October 1980	DC
Minister of Health	Aldo Aniasi	4 April 1980	18 October 1980	PSI
Minister of Foreign Trade	Enrico Manca	4 April 1980	18 October 1980	PSI
Minister of Merchant Navy	Nicola Signorello	4 April 1980	18 October 1980	DC
Minister of State Holdings	Gianni De Michelis	4 April 1980	18 October 1980	PSI
Minister of Labour and Social Security	Franco Foschi	4 April 1980	18 October 1980	DC
Minister of Cultural and Environmental Heritage	Oddo Biasini	4 April 1980	18 October 1980	PRI
Minister of Tourism and Entertainment	Bernardo D'Arezzo	4 April 1980	18 October 1980	DC
Minister of Regional Affairs (without portfolio)	Vincenzo Russo	4 April 1980	18 October 1980	DC
Minister for the Coordination of Scientific and Technological Research Initiatives (without portfolio)	Vincenzo Balzamo	4 April 1980	18 October 1980	PSI
Minister for the Coordination of Community Policies (without portfolio)	Vincenzo Scotti	4 April 1980	18 October 1980	DC
Minister of Public Function (without portfolio)	Massimo Severo Giannini	4 April 1980	18 October 1980	PSI
Minister for Extraordinary Interventions in the South (without portfolio)	Nicola Capria	4 April 1980	18 October 1980	PSI
Minister for Parliamentary Relations (without portfolio)	Remo Gaspari	4 April 1980	18 October 1980	DC
Minister for Social Tasks (without portfolio)	Beniamino Andreatta	4 April 1980	18 October 1980	DC
Secretary of the Council of Ministers	Piergiorgio Bressani	4 April 1980	18 October 1980	DC
