= B.TECH (company) =

Egyptian retail products chain

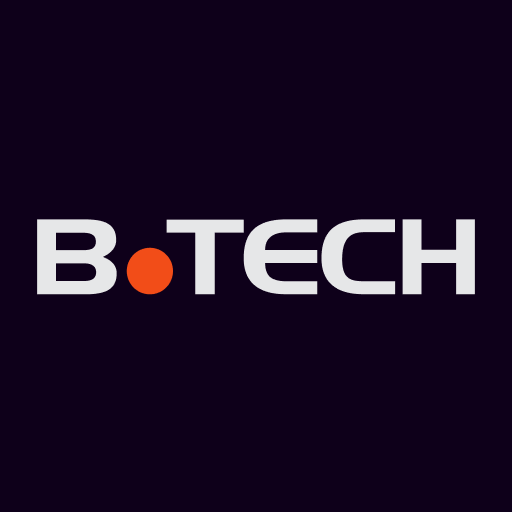
- Industry: Retail
- Founded: 1997
- Area served: Egypt
- Key people: Mahmoud Khattab (CEO)
- Products: Home appliances, consumer durables, electronic goods and gadgets
- Number of employees: 4200
- Website: btech.com/en

B.TECH is an Egyptian omnichannel retailer and consumer finance platform.

== History ==
Prior to its renaming in 2003, B.TECH was known as Olympic Stores. It operates over 88 branches spread across 25 governorates in Egypt, with more than 600 dealers and distributors.

== Brands ==
B.TECH is an authorized seller of Braun, Ariston, Miele, Apple.

== Partnerships ==
In 2016, Development Partners International (DPI), a UK private equity group acquired 33.3% of B.Tech. for $35 million. The strategic partnership enabled the enhancement of supply chain and IT infrastructure and a number of new products were introduced.

The online payment operations of B.Tech. are facilitated by Fawry Banking & Payment Technology Services Ltd. Apart from bank mobile wallets and credit cards, FawryPay provides customers with direct debit or automatic debit of installment amounts from their debit and credit cards.

== Expansion ==
During a 2015 press conference, the company's Chairman Mahmoud Khattab announced that they have increased their total sales area by 8,000 m^{2} (86,000 sq ft) and provided 300 new job opportunities.

B.TECH opened 17 new branches in 2019 with the intention of covering all governorates in Egypt. It runs 75 authorized service centers across Egypt. B.Tech. Academy was set up to offer certified programs for employee skill development.

B.TECH launched its technological school in 2020.
