= Franco Reviglio =

Italian academic and politician (1935–2025)

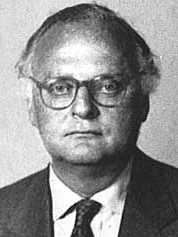

Minister of Finance
- In office 21 February 1993 – 31 March 1993
- Prime Minister: Giuliano Amato
- Preceded by: Giovanni Goria
- Succeeded by: Giuliano Amato (acting)
- In office 4 August 1979 – 28 June 1981
- Prime Minister: Francesco Cossiga; Arnaldo Forlani
- Preceded by: Franco Maria Malfatti
- Succeeded by: Rino Formica

Minister of Budget
- In office 28 June 1992 – 28 April 1993
- Prime Minister: Giuliano Amato
- Preceded by: Paolo Cirino Pomicino
- Succeeded by: Beniamino Andreatta

Member of the Senate of the Republic
- In office 23 April 1992 – 14 April 1994
- Constituency: Piedmont

Personal details
- Born: 3 February 1935 Turin, Italy
- Died: 23 October 2025 (aged 90) Turin, Italy
- Party: Italian Socialist Party
- Education: University of Turin
- Profession: University professor

Franco Reviglio (3 February 1935 – 23 October 2025) was an Italian academic, businessman and socialist politician, who served in various capacities in the public administration of Italy.

A member of the Italian Socialist Party, Reviglio served as the Italian minister of finance from 1979 to 1981 and again for a brief period in 1993. He also served as minister of budget from 1992 to 1993, and as a member of the Italian senate for Piedmont from 1992 to 1994.

At various points, Reviglio also worked as a professor at University of Turin, as the president of the major Italian energy company ENI, and as an advisor to the investment banks Lehman Brothers and Wasserstein Perella & Co., among other positions.

== Early life and education ==
Reviglio was born in Turin on 3 February 1935. He was also educated in Turin. He earned his Bachelor of Law degree from the University of Turin. His undergraduate thesis was about improving efficiency in state-owned companies.

== Career ==
Reviglio worked as a professor of public finance at the University of Turin. He was a member of the Socialist Party and served as the minister of finance from 4 August 1979 to 28 June 1981 in the first and second cabinets led by Prime Minister Francesco Cossiga, as well as the succeeding Forlani Cabinet. After working at the University of Turin for two more years he left his job in 1983 and became the president of the Italian energy firm Ente Nazionale Idrocarburi, which is commonly known as ENI. He was appointed to the post in order to reorganize and improve the firm. He achieved these goals in large degree. In fact, ENI witnessed one of its most successful periods when he led the firm. He supported privatization as a means of reorganizing asset portfolios and investment strategies. Reviglio's tenure at the firm ended in November 1989, and Umberto Colombo succeeded him in the post.

On 5 June 1990, Reviglio joined as a senior advisor to Wasserstein Perella & Co.'s team in regard to its European operations and held the post until 1992. In 1992, he was appointed budget minister in the cabinet led by Prime Minister Giuliano Amato. His tenure lasted until February 1993, and he was replaced by Beniamino Andreatta as budget minister. Reviglio was appointed finance minister in a cabinet reshuffle on 21 February 1993. He succeeded Giovanni Goria in the post. Reviglio resigned from office on 30 March 1993 due to his alleged involvement in a bribery scandal. He also served as a member of municipal council of Turin and as a senator (1992–1994).

After leaving office and politics, Reviglio returned to his teaching post at the University of Turin. He also assumed the role of senior advisor to Lehman Brothers from 2002 to 2007. He was the president and CEO of Azienda Energetica Metropolitana Torino SpA (Turin Energy Company; 2000–2006) as well as the president of NNOICOM, TLC company.

== Death ==
Reviglio died at his home town, Turin, on 23 October 2025, at the age of 90.
