= Maria De Unterrichter Jervolino =

Italian politician (1902–1975)

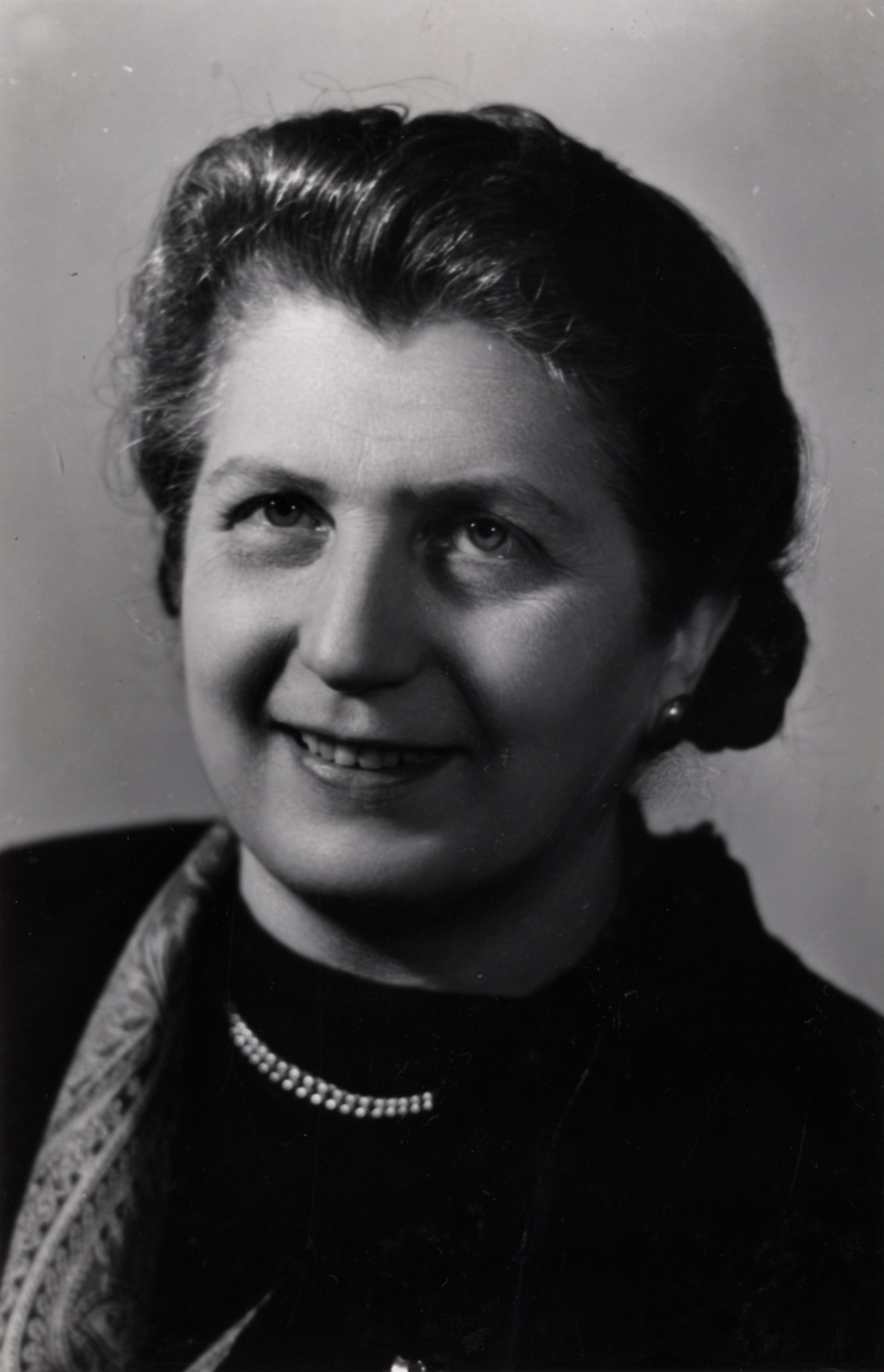
- Official portrait, 1948

Undersecretary for Public Education
- In office 1954–1958

Member of the Chamber of Deputies
- In office 1948–1953
- Constituency: National
- In office 1953–1963
- Constituency: Salerno–Avellino–Benevento

Member of the Constituent Assembly
- In office 1946–1948
- Constituency: National

Personal details
- Born: Maria De Unterrichter; 20 August 1902 Wulsan, Austria-Hungary
- Died: 27 December 1975 (aged 73) Rome, Italy
- Party: Christian Democracy (DC)
- Spouse: Angelo Raffaele Jervolino (m. 1930)
- Children: Rosa Jervolino
- Education: Sapienza University of Rome
- Occupation: Schoolteacher; politician

Maria De Unterrichter Jervolino (née De Unterrichter; 20 August 1902 – 27 December 1975) was an Italian teacher and politician. She was elected to the Constituent Assembly in 1946 as one of the first group of women parliamentarians in Italy and subsequently served in the Chamber of Deputies from 1948 to 1963.

== Biography ==
De Unterrichter was born in Wulsan in Austria-Hungary (now Ossana in Italy) in 1902, the daughter of Arturo De Unterrichter and Santa Belli. During World War I the family moved to Innsbruck, but returned to Wulsan, now part of Italy, after the war. She completed her education at the Liceo classico Giovanni Prati, before studying literature at the Sapienza University of Rome. She subsequently became a teacher. Between 1925 and 1929 she served as president of the Italian Catholic Federation of University Students. In 1930 she married Angelo Raffaele Jervolino; the couple moved to Naples, where they had a daughter, Rosa.

In the 1946 general elections De Unterrichter and her husband were elected to the Constituent Assembly as representatives of Christian Democracy. She was re-elected in the 1948 elections on the national list, and then in 1953 from Salerno–Avellino–Benevento; the following year she was appointed Undersecretary for Public Education. She was re-elected again in 1958, with her brother Guido also elected to the Senate. She served in the Chamber until retiring from politics in 1963.

After leaving parliament, De Unterrichter became a member of the Italian commission at UNESCO and served as president of the Italian committee of the World Organisation for Preschool Education, as well as being a founder of the Centre of Professional Education for Social Workers, of which she remained president until death. She served as world vice president of Association Montessori Internationale and president of the Opera Nazionale Montessori. Whilst she was a member of the Italian parliament, De Unterrichter Jervolino nominated Maria Montessori thrice for the Nobel Peace Price: in 1949, 1950, 1951 – without success.

De Unterrichter died in Rome in 1975. Her daughter Rosa later served as Minister of Public Education and Minister of the Interior during the 1990s.
