= Ferdinando Facchiano =

Italian lawyer and politician (1927–2022)

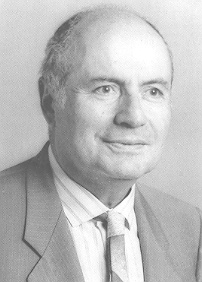
- Facchiano in 1987

Minister for the Coordination of Civil Protection
- In office 28 June 1992 – 29 April 1993
- Preceded by: Nicola Capria
- Succeeded by: Vito Riggio

Minister of Merchant Navy
- In office 13 April 1991 – 28 June 1992
- Preceded by: Carlo Vizzini
- Succeeded by: Giancarlo Tesini

Minister for Cultural and Environmental Heritage
- In office 23 July 1989 – 13 April 1991
- Preceded by: Vincenza Bono Parrino
- Succeeded by: Giulio Andreotti

Member of the Chamber of Deputies of Italy
- In office 29 June 1987 – 14 April 1994
- Constituency: Benevento

Personal details
- Born: 19 August 1927 Ceppaloni, Italy
- Died: 10 October 2022 (aged 95) Ceppaloni, Italy
- Party: PSDI
- Education: University of Naples Federico II
- Occupation: Lawyer

Ferdinando Facchiano (19 August 1927 – 10 October 2022) was an Italian lawyer and politician. A member of the Italian Democratic Socialist Party, he served as Minister for Cultural and Environmental Heritage from 1989 to 1991 and served in the Chamber of Deputies from 1987 to 1994.

Facchiano died in Ceppaloni on 10 October 2022, at the age of 95.
