= Raffaele Costa =

Italian politician (1936–2026)

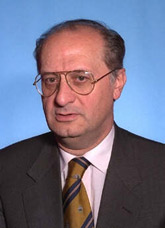

President of the Province of Cuneo
- In office 13 June 2004 – 9 June 2009
- Preceded by: Giovanni Quaglia
- Succeeded by: Gianna Gancia

Member of the European Parliament
- In office 13 June 1999 – 13 June 2004

Minister of Health
- In office 21 February 1993 – 23 April 1993
- Prime Minister: Giuliano Amato
- Preceded by: Francesco De Lorenzo
- Succeeded by: Maria Pia Garavaglia
- In office 10 May 1994 – 17 January 1995
- Prime Minister: Silvio Berlusconi
- Preceded by: Maria Pia Garavaglia
- Succeeded by: Elio Guzzanti

Secretary of the Italian Liberal Party
- In office 27 May 1993 – 6 February 1994
- Preceded by: Renato Altissimo
- Succeeded by: None

Minister of Transport and Navigation
- In office 28 April 1993 – 10 May 1994
- Prime Minister: Giuliano Amato
- Preceded by: Giancarlo Tesini
- Succeeded by: Publio Fiori

Minister for the Coordination of Community Policies and Regional Affairs
- In office 28 June 1992 – 21 February 1993
- Prime Minister: Giuliano Amato
- Preceded by: Pier Luigi Romita (Coordination of Community Policies); Mino Martinazzoli (Regional Affairs)
- Succeeded by: Gianfranco Ciaurro

Member of the Chamber of Deputies
- In office 5 July 1976 – 27 April 2006
- Constituency: Piedmont 2 – Fossano

Personal details
- Born: 8 September 1936 Mondovì, Kingdom of Italy
- Died: 11 September 2026 (aged 90) Mondovì, Italy
- Party: PLI (1976–1994); UdC (1993–1998); Forza Italia (1998–2009); PdL (2009–2010)

Raffaele Costa (8 September 1936 – 11 September 2026) was an Italian politician who was a deputy for decades and a minister and undersecretary in various governments. He was the president of the province of Cuneo from June 2004 to June 2009. Previously, he was a member of the Chamber of Deputies representing the Italian Liberal Party and later Forza Italia between 1976 and 2003, and was also Minister for the Coordination of Community Policies and Regional Affairs from 1992 to 1993, Minister of Transport and Navigation from 1993 to 1994, Minister of Health between 1993 and 1995, and a member of the European Parliament (MEP) of the European People's Party from 1999 until June 2004. He was an author and publisher, and his son Enrico Costa also became a prominent politician.

== Early life and education ==
Costa was born on 8 September 1936 in Mondovì, in the Italian region of Piedmont during the Fascist Italy era of the Kingdom of Italy. He held a degree in Law and Political Science. His son, Enrico Costa, is also a politician and was Minister of Regional Affairs and Autonomies (a post Costa himself held from 1992 to 1993) in the Matteo Renzi government (2014–2016) and the ensuing Paolo Gentiloni government (2016–2018).

== Career ==
Costa was elected to the Chamber of Deputies in 1976, 1979, 1983, 1987, 1992, 1994, 1996, and 2001. He was minister without portfolio for the co-ordination of community political and regional affairs (1992–1993), Minister of Health (1993–1995), and Minister of Transport and Navigation (1993–1994) in the Carlo Azeglio Ciampi government (from 2 January 1994 also Minister of Navigation). Previously, he had served as the parliamentary undersecretary of state in the Ministry of Grace and Justice in the first Francesco Cossiga government (1979–1980), the Ministry of Foreign Affairs in Giovanni Spadolini's governments (1981–1982) and the fifth Amintore Fanfani government (1982–1983), the Ministry of the Interior in Bettino Craxi's governments (1983–1987), and the Ministry of Public Works in the Giovanni Goria government and the ensuing Ciriaco De Mita government (1987–1989).

In 1992, Costa proposed a parliamentary commission about the waste at the UEFA Euro 1992 that came after the event, with Umberto Zappelloni writing on the matter in Il Foglio that "when the accounts were done, the total cost came to 7,230 billion lire, of which over 6,000 came from the state coffers." This triggered a long series of controversies, culminating in the establishment of two parliamentary commissions (the first by Costa and the second in 1999 promoted by Athos De Luca). The two investigations yielded no results.

During his parliamentary career, Costa was chairman of the Defence Committee of the Chamber of Deputies, vice-chairman of the Agriculture and Forestry Committee of the Chamber of Deputies (1976–1979), general secretary of the Italian Liberal Party (1993–1994), chairman of the Liberal Democratic Federalist parliamentary group (1995–1996), administrator of Forza Italia's Office for Citizens' Rights, and president of the province of Cuneo (2004–2009). Elected a MEP in the 1999 European Parliament election in Italy as a member of Forza Italia and in the European People's Party European Parliament group, Costa was a European Parliament member of the former Committee on the Atmosphere, the Committee on Budgetary Control, Committee on the Environment, Public Health and Food Safety, and the Committee on Internal Market and Consumer Protection.

== Death ==
Raffaele Costa died on 11 September 2026, three days after his 90th birthday.

== Author and publisher ==
Costa wrote four books, including The Doctor Is Outside the Room, My First Republic, Italy: Land of Waste, and Italy: Land of Privilege. He founded and published the periodical Il Duemila in 1971.

Political offices
Preceded by Pier Luigi Romita	Minister for the Coordination of Community Policies and Regional Affairs; 1992–1993	Succeeded by Gianfranco Ciaurro
Preceded by Francesco De Lorenzo	Minister of Health; 1993	Succeeded by Maria Pia Garavaglia
Preceded by Giancarlo Tesini	Minister of Transport and Navigation; 1993–1994	Succeeded by Pubblio Fiori
Preceded by Maria Pia Garavaglia	Minister of Health; 1994–1995	Succeeded by Elio Guzzanti
Preceded by Renato Altissimo	Secretary of Italian Liberal Party; 1994–1995	Succeeded by Dissolved
