= Minister of Transport (Italy) =

Ministry in the Cabinet of Italy

This is a list of the Italian ministers of transport. The list shows also the ministers that served under the same office but with other names; in fact, this ministry has changed name many times.

== List of ministers ==
Parties

- 1946–1994:

Communist Party Christian Democracy Democratic Socialist Party Socialist Party Liberal Party

- Since 1994:

National Alliance Democrats of the Left Italian Renewal Forza Italia/The People of Freedom Party of Italian Communists New Centre-Right Democratic Party Five Star Movement Independent

Name (Born–Died)	Portrait	Term of office		Political party	Government
Ministers of Transport
Giacomo Ferrari (1887–1974)		July 13, 1946	May 31, 1947	Italian Communist Party	De Gasperi II·III
Guido Corbellini (1890–1976)		May 31, 1946	January 27, 1950	Christian Democracy	De Gasperi IV·V
Ludovico D'Aragona (1876–1961)		January 27, 1950	April 5, 1951	Italian Democratic Socialist Party	De Gasperi VI
Pietro Campilli (1891–1974)		April 5, 1951	July 26, 1951	Christian Democracy	De Gasperi VI
Piero Malvestiti (1899–1964)		July 26, 1951	July 16, 1953	Christian Democracy	De Gasperi VII
Giuseppe Togni (1903–1981)		July 16, 1953	August 17, 1953	Christian Democracy	De Gasperi VIII
Bernardo Mattarella (1905–1971)		August 17, 1953	July 6, 1955	Christian Democracy	Pella; Fanfani I Scelba
Armando Angelini (1891–1968)		July 6, 1955	March 25, 1960	Christian Democracy	Segni I Zoli; Fanfani II; Segni II
Fiorentino Sullo (1921–2000)		March 25, 1960	April 11, 1960	Christian Democracy	Tambroni
Mario Ferrari Aggradi (1916–1997)		April 11, 1960	July 26, 1960	Christian Democracy	Tambroni
Giuseppe Spataro (1897–1979)		July 26, 1960	February 21, 1962	Christian Democracy	Fanfani III
Bernardo Mattarella (1905–1971)		February 21, 1962	June 21, 1963	Christian Democracy	Fanfani IV
Ministers of Transport and Civil Aviation
Guido Corbellini (1890–1976)		June 21, 1963	December 4, 1963	Christian Democracy	Leone I
Angelo Raffaele Jervolino (1890–1985)		December 4, 1963	February 23, 1966	Christian Democracy	Moro I·III
Oscar Luigi Scalfaro (1918–2012)		February 23, 1966	December 12, 1968	Christian Democracy	Moro III; Leone II
Luigi Mariotti (1912–2004)		December 12, 1968	August 5, 1969	Christian Democracy	Rumor I
Remo Gaspari (1921–2011)		August 5, 1969	March 27, 1970	Christian Democracy	Rumor II
Italo Viglianesi (1916–1995)		March 27, 1970	February 17, 1972	Italian Socialist Party	Rumor III; Colombo
Oscar Luigi Scalfaro (1918–2012)		February 17, 1972	July 26, 1972	Christian Democracy	Andreotti I
Aldo Bozzi (1909–1987)		July 26, 1972	July 7, 1973	Italian Liberal Party	Andreotti II
Luigi Preti (1914–2009)		July 7, 1974	November 23, 1974	Italian Socialist Democratic Party	Rumor IV·V
Ministers of Transport
Mario Martinelli (1906–2001)		November 23, 1974	July 29, 1976	Christian Democracy	Moro IV·V
Attilio Ruffini (1925–2011)		July 29, 1976	September 18, 1977	Christian Democracy	Andreotti III
Vittorio Lattanzio (1926–2010)		September 18, 1977	March 11, 1978	Christian Democracy	Andreotti III
Vittorino Colombo (1925–1996)		March 11, 1978	March 20, 1979	Christian Democracy	Andreotti IV
Luigi Preti (1914–2009)		March 20, 1979	April 4, 1980	Italian Socialist Democratic Party	Andreotti IV; Cossiga I
Rino Formica (1927– )		April 4, 1980	July 28, 1981	Italian Socialist Party	Cossiga II; Forlani
Vincenzo Balzamo (1929–1992)		July 28, 1981	December 1, 1982	Italian Socialist Party	Spadolini I·II
Mario Casalinuovo (1922–2018)		December 1, 1982	August 4, 1983	Italian Socialist Party	Fanfani V
Claudio Signorile (1937– )		August 4, 1983	April 17, 1987	Italian Socialist Party	Craxi I·II
Giovanni Travaglini (1924–2020)		April 17, 1987	July 28, 1987	Christian Democracy	FanfaniI VI
Calogero Mannino (1939–)		July 28, 1987	April 13, 1988	Christian Democracy	Goria
Giorgio Santuz (1936– )		April 13, 1988	July 22, 1989	Christian Democracy	De Mita
Carlo Bernini (1936–2011)		July 22, 1989	July 28, 1992	Christian Democracy	Andreotti VI·VII
Giancarlo Tesini (1929–2023)		July 22, 1992	April 28, 1993	Christian Democracy	Amato I
Ministers of Transport and Navigation
Raffaele Costa (1936–2026)		April 28, 1993	May 10, 1994	Italian Liberal Party	Ciampi
Publio Fiori (1938–2024)		May 10, 1994	January 17, 1995	National Alliance	Berlusconi I
Giovanni Caravale (1935–1997)		January 17, 1995	May 18, 1996	Independent	Dini
Claudio Burlando (1954– )		May 18, 1996	October 21, 1998	Democrats of the Left	Prodi I
Tiziano Treu (1939– )		October 21, 1998	December 22, 1999	Italian Renewal	D'Alema I
Pier Luigi Bersani (1951– )		December 22, 1999	July 11, 2001	Democrats of the Left	D'Alema II; Amato II
Minister of Infrastructure and Transport
Pietro Lunardi (1939– )		June 11, 2001	May 17, 2006	Forza Italia	Berlusconi II·III
Minister of Transport
Alessandro Bianchi (1945– )		May 17, 2006	May 8, 2008	Party of Italian Communists	Prodi II
Ministers of Infrastructure and Transport
Altero Matteoli (1940–2017)		May 8, 2008	November 16, 2011	The People of Freedom	Berlusconi IV
Corrado Passera (1954– )		November 16, 2011	April 28, 2013	Independent	Monti
Maurizio Lupi (1959– )		April 28, 2013	March 20, 2015	The People of Freedom/ New Centre-Right	Letta
Maurizio Lupi (1959– )		April 28, 2013	March 20, 2015	The People of Freedom/ New Centre-Right	Renzi
Graziano Delrio (1960– )		April 2, 2015	June 1, 2018	Democratic Party	Renzi; Gentiloni
Danilo Toninelli (1974– )		June 1, 2018	September 5, 2019	Five Star Movement	Conte I
Paola De Micheli (1973– )		September 5, 2019	February 13, 2021	Democratic Party	Conte II
Minister of Sustainable Infrastructure and Mobility
Enrico Giovannini (1957– )		February 13, 2021	Incumbent	Independent	Draghi
