= Fernanda Contri =

Italian jurist and politician (1935–2025)

Vice President of the Constitutional Court
- In office 2004–2005

Judge of the Constitutional Court
- In office 1996–2005
- Appointed by: Oscar Luigi Scalfaro

Minister of Social Affairs
- In office 28 April 1993 – March 1994
- Prime Minister: Carlo Azeglio Ciampi

Minister of State
- In office 1992–1993
- Prime Minister: Giuliano Amato

Personal details
- Born: 1935 Ivrea, Kingdom of Italy
- Died: 27 December 2025 (aged 90) Rapallo, Italy

Fernanda Contri (21 August 1935 – 27 December 2025) was an Italian jurist and politician. She was one of the first women to hold senior positions in the Italian judiciary system, and the first to be appointed to the Constitutional Court of Italy.

== Life and career ==
Contri was born in 1935. She joined the Higher Council of the Judiciary in 1986. She was the minister of state in the cabinet led by Prime Minister Giuliano Amato in the period 1992–1993. Then she was named the minister of social affairs to cabinet of Carlo Azeglio Ciampi in 1993 and was in office until March 1994. From October 1993 to February 1994 she developed an immigration reform bill in a commission called the Contri Commission. Due to the fall of the cabinet in March 1994, the bill, known as Contri Bill, was not approved and materialized although it was the most comprehensive legal framework on immigration in Italy and offered many advantages to the migrants.

In 1996, President Oscar Luigi Scalfaro appointed her to the Constitutional Court as a judge which she held until 2005. During her term she also served as its vice president in 2004.

Contri died at the age of 90 on 27 December 2025 at the hospital in Rapallo.
