= Carlo Donat-Cattin =

Italian politician and trade unionist (1919–1991)

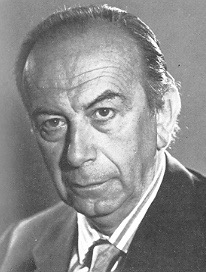

Minister of Labour and Social Security
- In office 5 August 1969 – 26 June 1972
- Prime Minister: Mariano Rumor; Emilio Colombo; Giulio Andreotti
- Preceded by: Giacomo Brodolini
- Succeeded by: Dionigi Coppo
- In office 22 July 1989 – 17 March 1991
- Prime Minister: Giulio Andreotti
- Preceded by: Rino Formica
- Succeeded by: Rosa Russo Iervolino

Minister of Industry, Trade and Crafts
- In office 23 November 1974 – 25 November 1978
- Prime Minister: Aldo Moro; Giulio Andreotti
- Preceded by: Ciriaco De Mita
- Succeeded by: Romano Prodi

Minister of Health
- In office 1 August 1986 – 22 July 1989
- Prime Minister: Bettino Craxi; Amintore Fanfani; Giovanni Goria; Ciriaco De Mita
- Preceded by: Costante Degan
- Succeeded by: Francesco De Lorenzo

Member of the Senate
- In office 19 June 1979 – 17 March 1991

Member of the Chamber of Deputies
- In office 12 June 1958 – 19 June 1979

Personal details
- Born: 26 June 1919 Finale Ligure, Italy
- Died: 17 March 1991 (aged 71) Monte Carlo, Monaco
- Party: Christian Democracy
- Occupation: Journalist, trade unionist, politician

Carlo Donat-Cattin (26 June 1919 – 17 March 1991) was an Italian politician and trade unionist. A member of Christian Democracy, he was several times minister of the Italian Republic. He was leader of the internal left current of the DC Forza Nuove (New Forces).

== Biography ==
Donat-Cattin was on 26 June 1919 in Finale Ligure. His father was from Turin, where Donat-Cattin moved at a young age. During World War II, he fought with the "White faction" (Christian-Democrat) of the Italian resistance movement. In 1950, Donat-Cattin took part in the foundation of the Italian Confederation of Workers' Trade Unions (Italian: Confederazione Italiana Sindacati Lavoratori, abbreviated as CISL). In the meantime he entered Christian Democracy (Italian Democrazia Cristiana, shortly DC), for which he was communal counsellor in Turin and from 1953 also provincial counsellor at the province of Turin.

Donat-Cattin was elected for the first time to the Italian Chamber of Deputies in 1958, a position he held until 1979, when he was elected to the Italian Senate. He was minister several times, first as Minister of Welfare and Health (Rumor II, III, Colombo and Andreotti I Cabinets (1969–1972), then as Minister of Mezzogiorno (Rumor IV, 1973) and, from 1974 to 1978, Minister of Industry and Trade in four consecutive governments (Moro IV and V, Andreotti III and IV).

Belonging to the left wing of the party, Donat-Cattin became vice-secretary of DC in 1978. He was initially in favour of dialogue towards DC's historical rival, the Italian Communist Party (Italian: Partito Comunista Italiano, or PCI), but after 1979 he became a supporter of the preambolo theory, which aimed to exclude PCI from any state charge. In 1980, however, after his son Marco was discovered to be a member of the far-left terrorist formation Prima Linea, he abandoned any public position and left politics for a while.

In 1986, Donat-Cattin was chosen as Minister of Health in the second Bettino Craxi-led government. At the time, he became a firm advocate of collaboration between DC and Craxi's party, the Italian Socialist Party. In 1989 he was Minister of Welfare in the Andreotti VI government. He died on 17 March 1991 in Montecarlo.
