= Francesco D'Onofrio (politician) =

Italian politician and academic (born 1939)

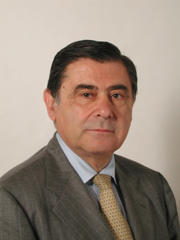

Minister of Public Education
- In office 10 May 1994 – 17 January 1995
- Prime Minister: Silvio Berlusconi
- Preceded by: Rosa Russo Iervolino
- Succeeded by: Giancarlo Lombardi

Member of the Senate
- In office 12 July 1983 – 1 July 1987
- In office 9 May 1996 – 28 April 2008

Member of the Chamber of Deputies
- In office 26 July 1990 – 9 May 1996

Personal details
- Born: 3 August 1939 (age 87) Salerno, Italy
- Party: DC (till 1994); CCD (1994-2002); UDC (since 2002)
- Education: University of Naples
- Occupation: Politician, academic, lawyer

Francesco D'Onofrio (born 3 August 1939) is an Italian politician and academic, former Minister of Public Education in the Berlusconi I Cabinet.

== Biography ==
D'Onofrio graduated in law at the University of Naples Federico II and achieved a Master in Law at the Harvard University under the guidance of Henry Kissinger, teaching a few years later Public Law at the Sapienza University of Rome.

In 1982, D'Onofrio joined the Christian Democracy, with which he has been elected to the Senate in 1983 and to the Chamber of Deputies in 1987 (he entered in Parliament only in 1990, replacing his colleague Giovanni Galloni who was elected to the CSM) and in 1992.

From 12 April 1991 to 24 April 1992, he joined the Andreotti VII Cabinet as undersecretary at the Ministry for Constitutional Reforms and at the Ministry for Regional Affairs.

In 1994, he joined Pier Ferdinando Casini's Christian Democratic Centre, allied with Silvio Berlusconi's Forza Italia, and is re-elected one more time to the Chamber of Deputies. In May 1994, D'Onofrio is appointed Minister of Public Education in the Berlusconi I Cabinet.

He is later re-elected to the Senate in 1996, in 2001 and in 2006. From 1996 to 2001, D'Onofrio has been the group leader in Palazzo Madama of the Christian Democratic Centre, while from 2006 to 2008 he has been the group leader of the Union of the Centre. He decided not to run again for a seat in Parliament in 2008.

He is currently a columnist of the online newspaper Formiche.net.
