= Angelo Raffaele Jervolino =

Italian politician (1890–1985)

Angelo Raffaele Jervolino OMRI
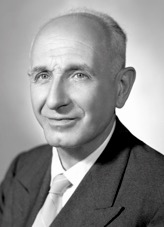

Minister of Transport
- In office 4 December 1963 – 23 February 1966
- Prime Minister: Aldo Moro
- Preceded by: Guido Corbellini
- Succeeded by: Oscar Luigi Scalfaro

Minister of Health
- In office 21 February 1962 – 4 December 1963
- Prime Minister: Amintore Fanfani; Giovanni Leone
- Preceded by: Camillo Giardina
- Succeeded by: Giacomo Mancini

Minister of Merchant Navy
- In office 15 February 1959 – 21 February 1962
- Prime Minister: Antonio Segni; Fernando Tambroni; Amintore Fanfani
- Preceded by: Giuseppe Spataro
- Succeeded by: Cino Macrelli

Minister of Post and Telecommunications
- In office 23 May 1948 – 27 January 1950
- Prime Minister: Alcide De Gasperi
- Preceded by: Ludovico D'Aragona
- Succeeded by: Giuseppe Spataro

Senator of the Republic
- In office 12 June 1958 – 4 June 1968
- Constituency: Campania

Member of the Chamber of Deputies
- In office 8 May 1948 – 11 June 1958
- Constituency: Naples

Member of the Constituent Assembly
- In office 25 June 1946 – 31 January 1948
- Constituency: Naples

Personal details
- Born: 2 September 1890 Naples, Kingdom of Italy
- Died: 10 March 1985 (aged 94) Rome, Italy
- Party: Christian Democracy
- Spouse: Maria De Unterrichter (m. 1930; died 1975)
- Children: Rosa Russo Iervolino
- Education: University of Naples Federico II
- Profession: Lawyer; professor

Angelo Raffaele Jervolino (2 September 1890 – 10 March 1985) was an Italian Christian Democrat politician. He was the father of former mayor of Naples Rosa Russo Jervolino.

== Biography ==
Angelo Raffaele Jervolino was born in Naples to a very poor family on 2 September 1890. Graduated in Law from the University of Naples Federico II and graduated from the same university for a Diplomatic and Consular career, he practiced law at the Supreme Court of Cassation, the Council of State, the Court of Auditors and the Sacra Romana Rota. He was also a professor of law for ten years at the Higher Institute of Letters and Sciences of Santa Chiara and a member of the Superior Forensic Council.

He entered the Neapolitan Catholic Action in 1908.

He served in the People's Party until its dissolution in 1926, however he preferred the activity of lay apostolate which he carried out through the Catholic Action of which he was diocesan president for Catholic Youth of Naples, then national councilor and general president for three two years from 1928 to 1934.

A convinced anti-fascist, he was a member of the National Liberation Committee representing the Christian Democracy, he participated as a protagonist in the birth of the democratic system and was political secretary of the DC for southern Italy until the capture of Rome, the day in which he and Migliori (secretary for northern Italy) resigned to hand the party over to Alcide De Gasperi.

He was called to be part of the Badoglio II government as undersecretary; he was part of the National Council; he was elected with very large suffrage to the Constituent Assembly in 1946 and joined that Assembly together with his wife Maria De Unterrichter, sister of Guido De Unterrichter.

Sub Commissioner of the Municipality in the period immediately following the Four days of Naples, in the following years, he was twice elected Municipal Councilor of Naples. He was elected Deputy in the first and second legislature in the college of Naples-Caserta. Among other things, he was the rapporteur for the law establishing the Fund for the South, as part of a continuous commitment to the southern areas.

He was elected Senator of the Republic in the third and fourth legislatures in the district of Nola.

He has participated in the government 13 times, five times as Undersecretary of State and eight times as Minister. In 1944 he was appointed Undersecretary of State at the Ministry of Education in the Badoglio Government. From 1944 to 1948 he was Undersecretary of State at the Ministry of Communications four times: in the first Bonomi Cabinet, in the second, third and fourth De Gasperi Cabinets. In 1948 he was appointed Minister of Post and Telecommunications in the V De Gasperi Government. In 1951 he was appointed Extraordinary Ambassador of Italy to Brazil. From 1960 to 1962 he was Minister of Merchant Navy in the second Segni and Tambroni government and in the third Fanfani government. From 1962 to 1963 he was Minister of Health in the fourth Fanfani government, reconfirmed in the first Leone government. From 1963 to 1966 he was Minister of Transport and Civil Aviation in the first and second Moro Governments.

On 12 December 1964, he was awarded the gold medal for Public Health by the President of the Republic. On 15 June 1968, he was appointed Knight of the Grand Cross Order of Merit of the Italian Republic.

He died on 10 March 1985 in Rome, aged 94.

== Awards and decorations ==
- Knight Grand Cross of the Order of Merit of the Italian Republic (1968)
