= Rino Formica =

Italian politician (born 1927)

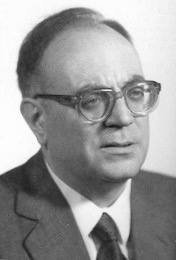

Minister of Finance
- In office 23 July 1989 – 28 June 1992
- Prime Minister: Giulio Andreotti
- Preceded by: Emilio Colombo
- Succeeded by: Giovanni Goria
- In office 28 June 1981 – 1 December 1982
- Prime Minister: Giovanni Spadolini
- Preceded by: Franco Reviglio
- Succeeded by: Francesco Forte
Other ministerial offices
Minister of Labour and Social Security
In office 29 July 1987 – 23 July 1989
Prime Minister	Giovanni Goria; Ciriaco De Mita
Preceded by	Ermanno Gorrieri
Succeeded by	Carlo Donat-Cattin
Minister of Transport
In office 4 April 1980 – 28 June 1981
Prime Minister	Francesco Cossiga; Arnaldo Forlani
Preceded by	Luigi Preti
Succeeded by	Vincenzo Balzamo
Parliamentary offices
Member of the Chamber of Deputies
In office 12 July 1983 – 14 April 1994
Constituency	Bari
Member of the Senate of the Republic
In office 20 June 1979 – 11 July 1983
Constituency	Lombardy
In office 5 June 1968 – 24 May 1972
Constituency	Apulia

Personal details
- Born: 1 March 1927 (age 99) Bari, Kingdom of Italy
- Party: Italian Socialist Party
- Education: University of Bari
- Occupation: Chartered accountant, politician

Salvatore Formica (born 1 March 1927), best known as Rino Formica, is a former Italian politician.

== Biography ==
Formica was born in Bari. He became a member of national importance of the Italian Socialist Party (Italian: Partito Socialista Italiano, or simply PSI) during the leadership of Bettino Craxi. He was several times Minister of the Italian Republic starting from 1980. He was Minister of Budget in the Spadolini II Cabinet, whose fall was caused by a quarrel between Formica and the other economy minister Beniamino Andreatta.

Formica was strongly critical of the PSI's transformation from a popular, social-based party into one involved in numerous corruption and official malfeasance scandals under Craxi. He declared "the convent is poor, but the monks are rich" (in reference to PSI's financial problems, where its members were instead increasingly well endowed), and defined PSI's national assembly as "a court of dwarves and ballerinas. Formica was one of the numerous PSI members involved in the Mani Pulite scandal of the early 1990s, although he was acquitted in the two trials raised against him. After Craxi's resignation as PSI national secretary in 1993, he supported Claudio Martelli as his successor. In 1994 he was not re-elected to the Italian Parliament for the first time since the 1970s.

In 2003, he founded a party called Socialismo è Libertà and later adhered to the new Italian Socialist Party, a small-sized formation of socialists who did not join the centre-left Democratic Party or the centre-right New PSI.

In February 2026, he declared that he would vote against the constitutional referendum promoted by Giorgia Meloni's right-wing government on judicial reform. He claimed that it was a law aimed at ushering in an authoritarian shift. He thus joined the socialist committee for the No vote (which also includes Elena Matteotti, granddaughter of Giacomo Matteotti), opposed to the socialists for the Yes vote (such as Bettino Craxi's son, Bobo Craxi). This situation marks yet another split within the Italian socialist diaspora.

== Electoral history ==
Election	House	Constituency	Party	Votes	Result
1968	Senate of the Republic	Apulia – Bari	PSI	25,936	Elected
1972	Senate of the Republic	Apulia – Bari	PSI	20,370	Not elected
1976	Chamber of Deputies	Bari–Foggia	PSI	25,138	Not elected
1979	Senate of the Republic	Lombardy – Milan VI	PSI	51,345	Elected
1983	Chamber of Deputies	Bari–Foggia	PSI	74,895	Elected
1987	Chamber of Deputies	Bari–Foggia	PSI	75,251	Elected
1992	Chamber of Deputies	Bari–Foggia	PSI	53,812	Elected
