= Vittorio Merloni =

Italian businessman

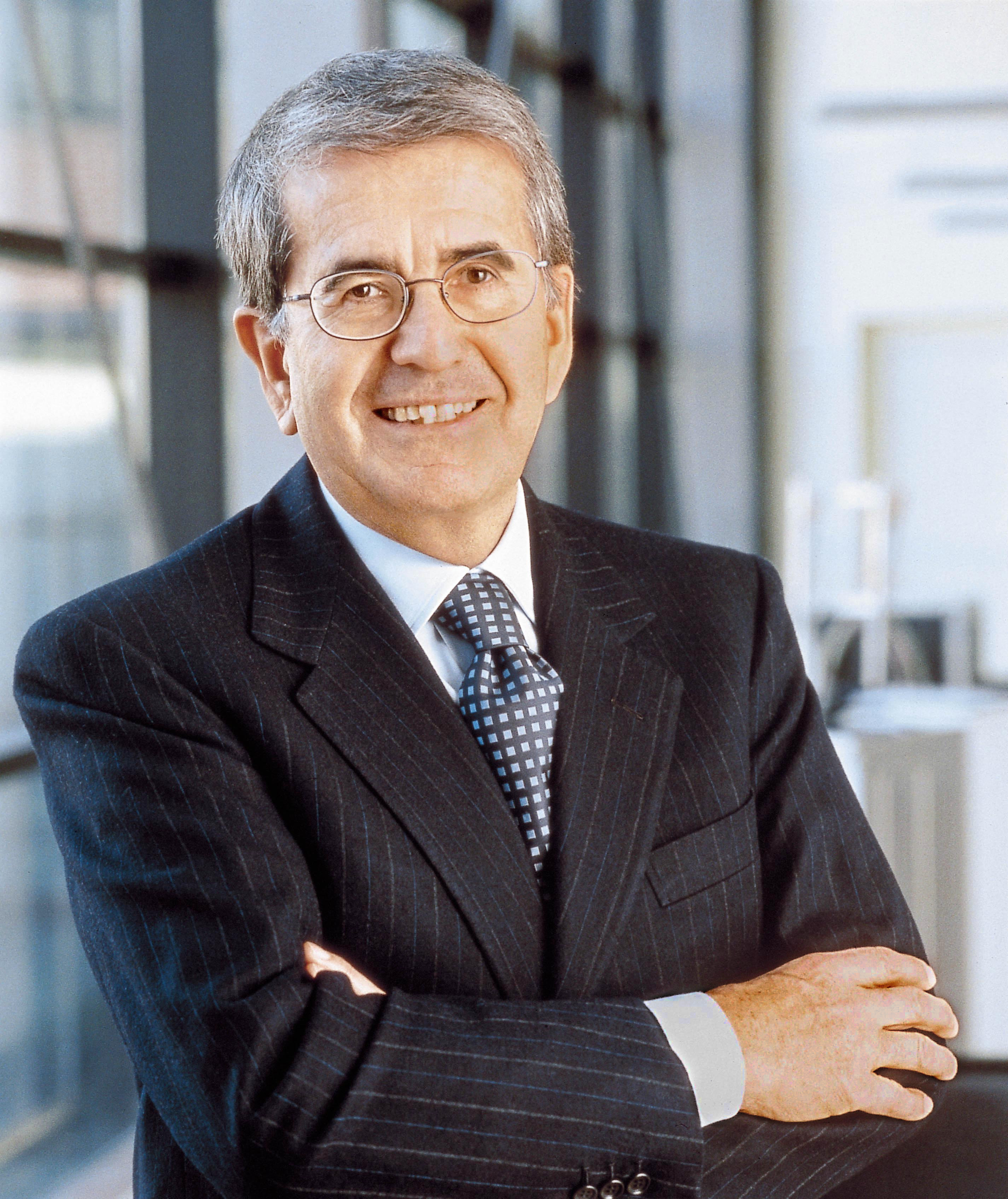
- Vittorio Merloni
- Born: 30 April 1933; Fabriano, Italy
- Died: 18 June 2016 (aged 83); Fabriano, Italy
- Known for: Founder, Indesit

Vittorio Merloni (30 April 1933 – 18 June 2016) was an Italian entrepreneur and industrialist. He was the honorary chairman of Indesit (chaired by his son Andrea Merloni) and Fineldo (chaired by his daughter Antonella), the family holding company that controls Indesit and other group interests.

== Early life ==
Vittorio Merloni was the son of Aristide Merloni. He had a degree in economics and commerce from the University of Perugia.

== Career ==
His entrepreneurial career began in the 1960s in the family business. In 1975 he founded Merloni Elettrodomestici (renamed Indesit in 2005) and he became the chairman, holding the position continuously until 29 April 2010, when he left the presidency to his son Andrea and was appointed honorary chairman.

The company, listed on the Milan stock exchange since 1987, is one of Europe’s leading manufacturers and distributors of large home appliances (washing machines, dryers, washer-dryers, dishwashers, fridges, freezers, cookers, hoods, ovens and hobs).

He became president of Confindustria (the Italian Employers’ Federation), a post he held for four years. In 1984, the year he was made a “Cavaliere del lavoro”, he was elected president of Centromarca, an Italian brand association, a post he held until 1988.

In 2001 he began a four-year presidency of Assonime, an Italian association of public limited companies. In the same year, he received an honorary doctorate in management engineering from the Politecnico di Milano. Since then he received various awards and acknowledgements: in 2003, two years after Indesit took over Hotpoint, a UK brand, he was made a Commander of the Order of the British Empire.

In 2004 he received the Leonardo Award for Internationalization and in 2005 he received the GEI (Gruppo Esponenti Italiani) award in New York City, in recognition and appreciation of his work in trade and industry, a contribution which has done much to improve Italy’s image abroad.

== Personal life ==
He was married to Franca Carloni and had four children: Maria Paola, Andrea, Antonella and Aristide. He died on 18 June 2016 at the age of 83.
