= Enrico Costa =

Enrico Costa may refer to:

- Enrico Costa (physicist) (born 1944), Italian astrophysicist
- Enrico Costa (politician) (born 1969), Italian politician and lawyer
- Enrico Costa (bobsledder) (born 1971), Italian bobsledder
