= Rossella Artioli =

Italian politician

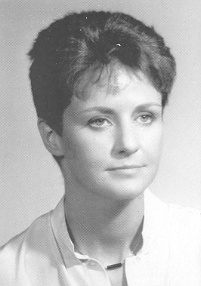

Member of the Chamber of Deputies
- In office 12 July 1983 – 14 April 1994
- Constituency: Milan–Pavia

Personal details
- Born: 26 January 1944 (age 81); Rome, Italy
- Political party: PSI (until 1994)

Rossella Artioli (born 26 January 1944) is an Italian teacher and former politician. She was a member of the Chamber of Deputies for the Italian Socialist Party (Partito Socialista Italiano; PSI).

== Early life ==
Artioli was born on 26 January 1944 in Rome, Italy. She received a degree in foreign languages and literature and worked as an English teacher. She was a member of the central committee of the PSI from 1972 and the civil secretary for the Milan chapter of the PSI from 1980.

== Political career ==
She was first elected to the Chamber of Deputies on 12 July 1983 in that year's general election as a representative for Milan-Pavia. She was a member of the commission on labour and social security and the commission on hygiene and public health. She was re-elected in the 1987 general election. She was a member of the commission on the budget and treasury and the commission on social affairs. She was also on the parliamentary commission on the investigation of the youth condition and the parliamentary commission on the investigation pursuant to Article 58.

Artioli was elected for the final time in the 1992 general election. She was appointed as vice president of the commission on social affairs. She was a member of the commission on the budget and treasury and of the parliamentary committee for prosecutorial proceedings. She was appointed as Secretary of State for the universities, scientific and technological research in the government of the former President of the Republic, Giuliano Amato, from 30 June 1992 until 28 April 1993. She then served as Secretary of State for industry, commerce and crafts in the government of Carlo Azeglio Ciampi from 7 May 1993 until 9 May 1994.
