= Pete Merloni =

American football player (1904–1967)

Profile
- Position: End,

Personal information
- Born: July 22, 1904
- Died: September 1967 (aged 63)
- Listed height: 5 ft 8 in (1.73 m)
- Listed weight: 160 lb (73 kg)

Career information
- College: University of Notre Dame

Career history
- Boston Bulldogs (1929)

Peter Merloni (July 22, 1904 – September 1967) was a professional football player who spent a season in the National Football League with the Boston Bulldogs in 1929. Prior to playing professional football, Merloni attended and played college football at the University of Notre Dame.
