= Giancarlo Tesini =

Italian politician (1929–2023)

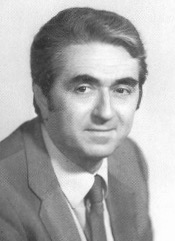

Minister of Transport
- In office 28 June 1992 – 28 April 1993
- Prime Minister: Giuliano Amato
- Preceded by: Carlo Bernini
- Succeeded by: Raffaele Costa

State Minister for Scientific and Technological Research
- In office 28 June 1981 – 1 December 1982
- Prime Minister: Giovanni Spadolini
- Preceded by: Pierluigi Romita
- Succeeded by: Pierluigi Romita

Member of the Chamber of Deputies
- In office 25 May 1972 – 22 April 1992
- Constituency: Bologna

Personal details
- Born: 5 February 1929 Bologna, Italy
- Died: 22 December 2023 (aged 94) Bologna, Italy
- Party: DC
- Profession: Sports manager

Giancarlo Tesini (5 February 1929 – 22 December 2023) was an Italian Christian Democracy politician and sports director.

Tesini was a deputy from 1972 to 1992 and served as minister without portfolio for scientific and technological research in the first and second cabinet of Giovanni Spadolini and as minister of transport in the first cabinet of Giuliano Amato.

Tesini was also president of Fortitudo Pallacanestro Bologna and Lega Basket.

Tesini died in Bologna on 22 December 2023, at the age of 94.
