= Indesit =

Italian appliance company

Indesit Company S.p.A.
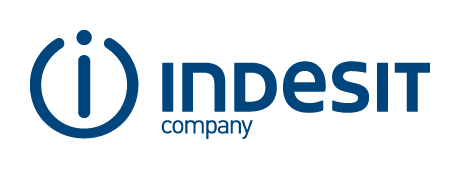

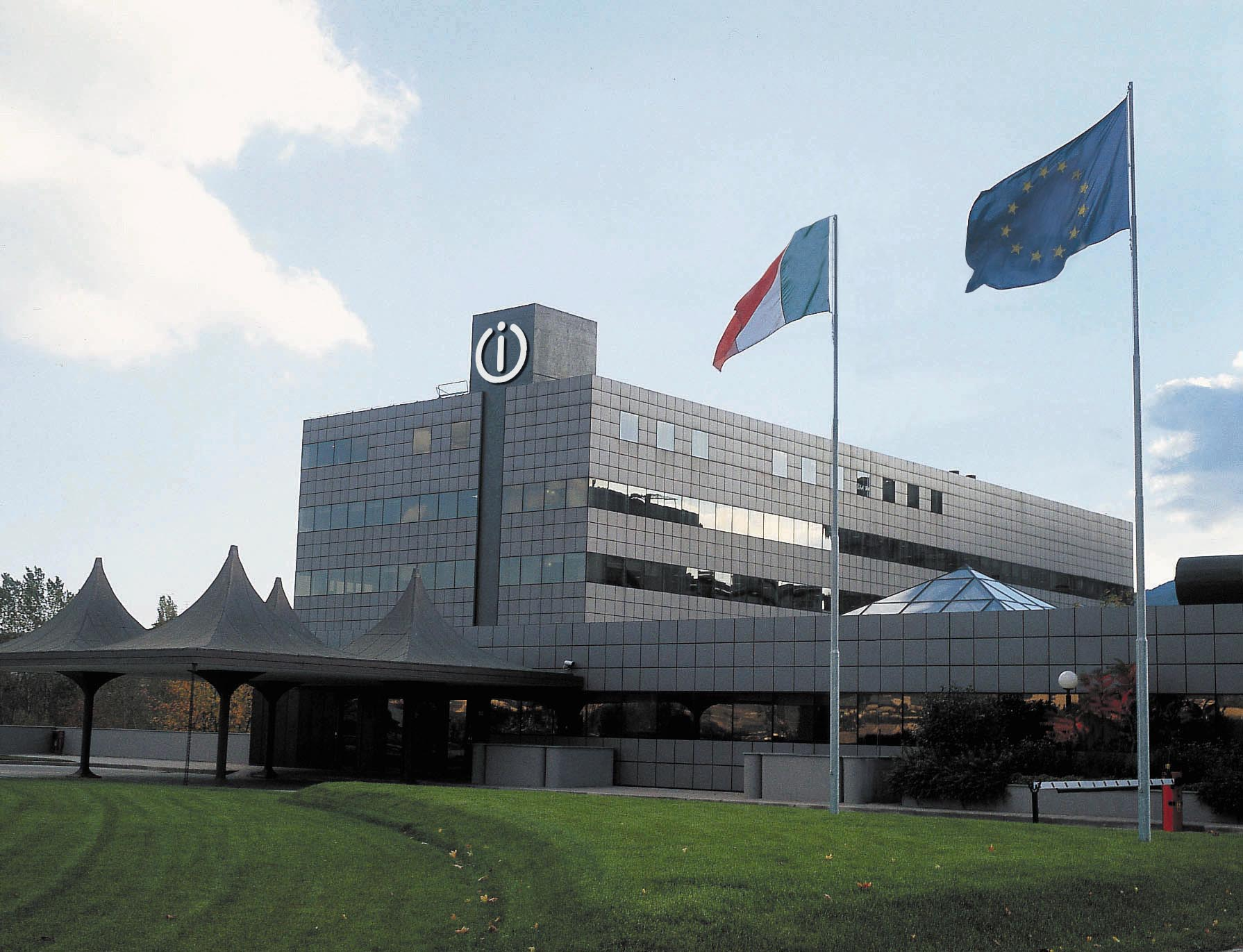
- Indesit Headquarters in Fabriano, Italy
- Formerly: Merloni Elettrodomestici S.p.A. (1975–2005)
- Type: Public
- Traded as: BIT: IND
- Industry: Home appliance
- Predecessor: Industrie Merloni
- Founded: 1975; 51 years ago
- Founder: Vittorio Merloni
- Defunct: 2016
- Fate: Merged into Whirlpool Europe, renamed Whirlpool EMEA
- Successor: Whirlpool EMEA
- Headquarters: Fabriano, Italy
- Area served: Worldwide
- Key people: Marco Milani (president and CEO)
- Products: Home appliances
- Revenue: ▲€8.74 billion (2023)
- Owner: Beko Europe (100%)
- Number of employees: 16,000 (2012)
- Parent: Whirlpool
- Website: www.indesit.com

Indesit Company S.p.A., more commonly known as Indesit (/ˈɪndɪsɪt/; Italian pronunciation: [ˈindezit]), is an Italian major appliance brand. It is one of the leading European manufacturers and distributors of home appliances.

Founded in 1975 as a company under the name Merloni Elettrodomestici S.p.A. and listed on the Milan Stock Exchange between 1987 and its 2014 purchase by Whirlpool, the group posted sales of €2.9 billion in 2012.

It has eight industrial areas in Italy, Poland, the UK, Russia and Turkey, and 16,000 employees.

== History ==
The company was founded in 1975 as Merloni Elettrodomestici by Vittorio Merloni as a spin-off from Industrie Merloni.

In the 1980s, with other Italian companies having been taken over by foreign appliance manufacturers, Merloni became the premier domestic producer in the industry. From 1981 the company went through a period of crisis, which ended in 1984, when Vittorio Merloni, having concluded his presidency of Confindustria, returned to managing Merloni. Profits and revenues of the company grew, and this led the Merloni family to decide in 1986 in favor of the company's entry into the stock market.

In 1987, Merloni Elettrodomestici, already publicly listed, acquired Indesit (founded in Turin, by Armando Campioni, Adelchi Candellero and Filippo Gatta in 1953), its biggest rival on the Italian market which also had a certain international presence, as well as 33% of Philco Italy. In 2005, Merloni Elettrodomestici was renamed Indesit Company.

In 1988, Merloni, under the Ariston and Indesit brands, had a turnover of USD1.059 billion, becoming the fourth largest European manufacturer of home appliances. The following year, it acquired and absorbed the French company Scholtès.

In 1990, the Marcegaglia Group, a supplier of the Fabriano-based company itself, entered the capital of Merloni Elettrodomestici and took over a 7% share. In the same year the company had approximately 6,000 employees in various establishments including France, Portugal and Russia.

In 1994, Merloni had a turnover of 1,920 billion lire with a market share of 10% in Europe. The following year took over one third of the capital of STAR (Società Trevigiana Apparecchi Riscaldamento), an Italian company of Conegliano Veneto producer of kitchen hoods, which will be fully acquired in 2002 and merged with the company in 2003.

In 1999, through Fineldo, the holding of Merloni family, acquired Panini, manufacturer of collectible stickers.

In 2000, Indesit took over the entire capital of Philco and acquired Stinol, the first Russian producer of household appliances.

=== Acquisition of Hotpoint ===
In 2002 Merloni Elettrodomestici finalized its acquisition of a 50% stake in GDA, the UK's top domestic appliance manufacturer known for its Hotpoint brand. This deal, authorized by the European Commission, made Merloni Europe's third-largest producer in the sector and the market leader in the UK.

The company of Fabriano in 2002 entered the consumer electronics industry with the purchase of Sinudyne.

In 2005, Indesit Company closes its French industrial site in Thionville. In February 2005, Merloni Elettrodomestici was renamed Indesit Company: Indesit is the best known of the group's brands outside Italy.

At the beginning of 2007, Indesit Company launched the group's new brand architecture, Hotpoint, and combined with Ariston to form the Hotpoint-Ariston brand.

On 31 July 2009 the Indesit closed its plant at Kinmel Park, Bodelwyddan, Denbighshire, Wales, UK due to a "continuing decline" in the market. The factory employed 305 workers.

Andrea Merloni, from 2010, succeeded his father Vittorio to lead the company as the new chairman. On 9 June 2010, the company announced an investment of 120 million over the three-year period 2010–2012 to consolidate its presence in Italy and simultaneously the closure of the two plants Brembate (Bergamo) and Refrontolo (Treviso).

In May 2011, the company signed sponsorship deals with Arsenal Football Club, of London.

In October 2012, Indesit signed a supply agreement with Waterlogic for advanced water purification devices. The agreement was valid until 2015. In 2012 Indesit Company announced its entry into the Small Domestic Appliances market.

In 2013, with reference to the year 2012, the maximum A+ application level was reached in the Sustainability Report.

In May 2013 Marco Milani was appointed Chairman of the group, maintaining simultaneously the role of CEO.

=== Whirlpool ownership ===
In 2014, Whirlpool agreed to pay 758 million euros to buy a 60% stake in Indesit, which was a market leader in Italy, the United Kingdom and Russia, from the Merloni family to further expand outside its U.S. home market. Following the buyout, Indesit was delisted from Borsa Italiana on 3 December of that year.

In 2016, Indesit Company merged with Whirlpool Europe, which changed its name to Whirlpool EMEA.

In 2017, police investigation pointed to an Indesit-made Hotpoint fridge freezer, model FF175BP of 2006-2009 (since discontinued) as the cause of the Grenfell Tower fire.

== The figures ==
Indesit Company has eight production sites, of which three are in Italy (Fabriano, Comunanza and Caserta), and five elsewhere (two in Poland, one in the UK, one in Russia and one in Turkey) counting 16 thousand employees.

== Brands ==
- Ariston
- Indesit
- Hotpoint Ariston
- Scholtès
- Stinol
- Termogamma

== See also ==
- Ariston (brand)
- Hotpoint Ariston
- Aristide Merloni
- Francesco Merloni
- Vittorio Merloni
