= Daria de Pretis =

Italian jurist

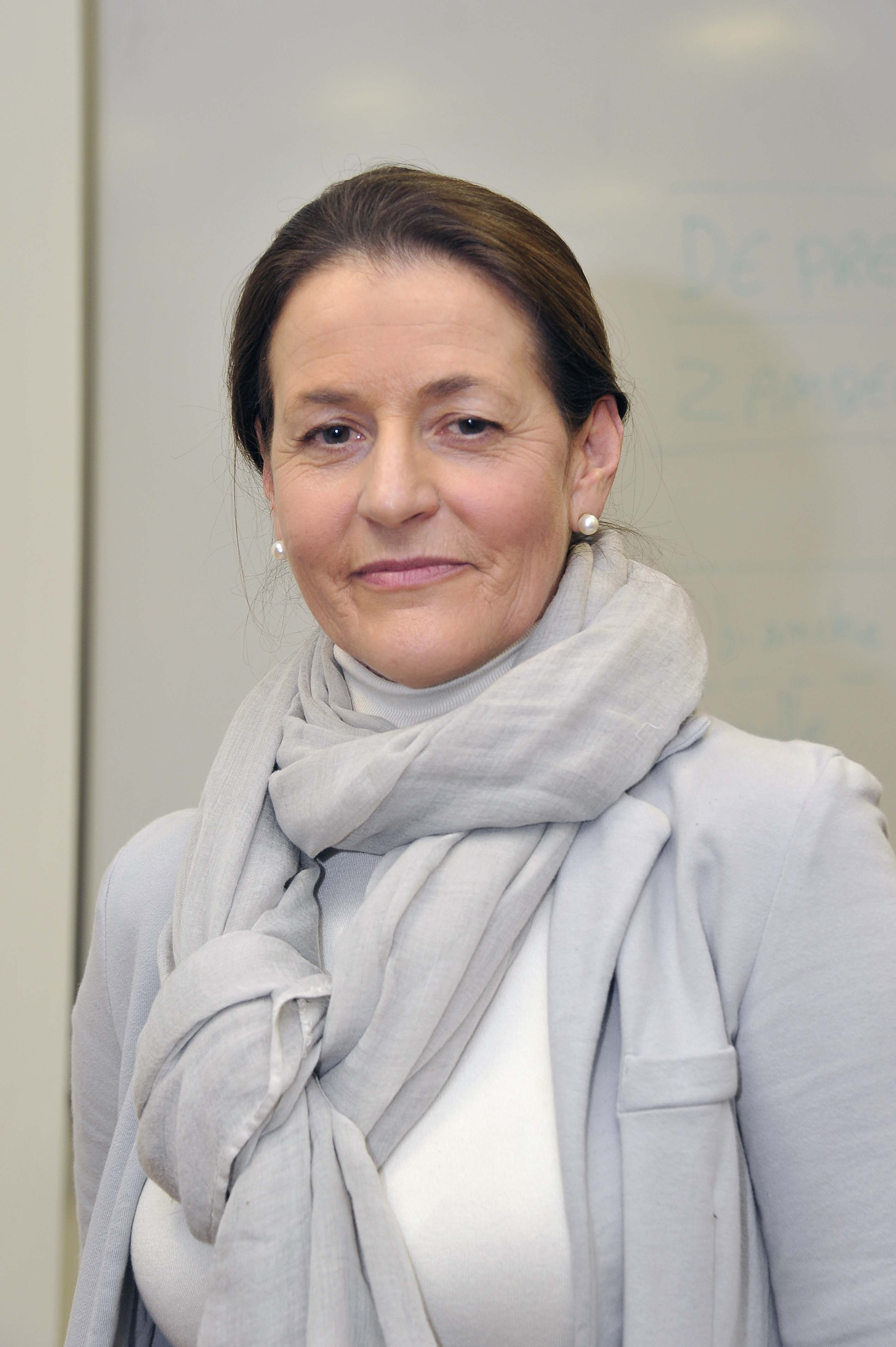
- Daria de Pretis

Judge of the Constitutional Court of Italy
- In office 11 November 2014 – 11 November 2023
- Appointed by: Giorgio Napolitano

Rector of the University of Trento
- In office 28 February 2013 – December 2014
- Preceded by: Davide Bassi
- Succeeded by: Paolo Collini

Personal details
- Born: 31 October 1956 (age 69) Cles, Italy
- Education: University of Bologna; Free University of Berlin

Daria de Pretis (born 31 October 1956) is an Italian jurist, Constitutional Judge of the Constitutional Court of Italy from 11 November 2014 to 11 November 2023 and a Law Professor. Previously she served as Rector of the University of Trento. She studied law at the University of Bologna and at the Free University of Berlin.

== Career ==
Daria de Pretis was a professor of Administrative, Comparative and Public law at the University of Trento, where she also served as Rector before being appointed to the Constitutional Court by the Italian President, Giorgio Napolitano, on 18 October 2014. At the university she also taught courses in EU Law and Law and Gender and was employed by the university for over twenty years. She was sworn in on 11 November 2014.

De Pretis has also served as head of the Italian Section of the International Institute of Administrative Sciences.

Academic offices
Preceded by Davide Bassi	Rector of the University of Trento; 2013–2014	Succeeded by Paolo Collini
