= Francesco De Lorenzo =

Italian politician (born 1938)

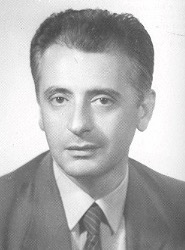

Minister of Health
- In office 22 July 1989 – 21 February 1993
- Prime Minister: Giulio Andreotti; Giuliano Amato
- Preceded by: Carlo Donat-Cattin
- Succeeded by: Raffaele Costa

Minister of the Environment
- In office 1 August 1986 – 17 April 1987
- Prime Minister: Bettino Craxi
- Preceded by: Valerio Zanone
- Succeeded by: Mario Pavan

Member of the Chamber of Deputies
- In office 12 July 1983 – 14 April 1994

Personal details
- Born: Francesco De Lorenzo; 5 June 1938 (age 87) Naples, Italy
- Party: Italian Liberal Party
- Height: 1.73 m (5 ft 8 in)
- Spouse: Marinella De Lorenzo
- Children: Ferruccio De Lorenzo, Alessandra De Lorenzo, Claudia De Lorenzo
- Parent: Ferruccio De Lorenzo (father)
- Occupation: Politician

Francesco De Lorenzo (born June 5, 1938 in Naples) is an Italian physician and politician and is a member of the Italian Liberal Party.

== Life and Works ==
He was born in Naples on June 5, 1938. He was minister of health (1989–1993) in the Government of Italy. He served in the cabinet of Prime Minister Bettino Craxi (1986–1987), Giulio Andreotti (1989–1992) and Giuliano Amato (1992–1993). He also served in the Chamber of Deputies of Italy in Legislature IX (1983–1987), Legislature X (1987–1992) and Legislature XI (1992–1994).

He was a central figure in the Tangentopoli bribery scandal uncovered by the Mani pulite investigations of the early 1990s.

== Publications ==
- Givol, D., De Lorenzo, F., Goldberger, R.F. and Anfinsen, C.B. Disulfide interchange and the three-dimensional structure of proteins. Proc. NatI. Acad. Sci. U.S.A., 53, 676, 1965
- Steiner, RF., De Lorenzo, F. and Anfinsen, C.B. Enzymically catalyzed disulfide interchange in randomly crosslinked soybean trypsin inhibitor. J. Biol. Chem., 240, 4648, 1965
- De Lorenzo, F., Goldberger, RF., Steers, E., Givol, D. and Anfinsen, C.B. Purification and properties of an enzyme from beef liver which catalyzes sulfhydryl-disulfide interchange in proteins . J. Biol. Chem., 241,1562,1966
- De Lorenzo, F., Fuchs, S. and Anfinsen, C.B. Characterization of a peptide fragment containing the essential half-cystine residue af a microsomal disulfide interchange enzyme'. Biochem., 5, 3961, 1966
- Givol, D. and De Lorenzo, F. The position of various cleavages of rabbit Immunoglobulin. G. J. Biol. Chem., 243, 1886, 1966
- De Lorenzo, F. and Ames, B.N. Histidine regulation in Salmonella typhimurium. VII. Purification and general properties of the histidine transfer ribonucleic acid synthetase. J. Biol. Chem., 245, 1710, 1970
- De Lorenzo, F., Straus, D. and Ames, B.N. Histidine regulation in Salmonella typhimurium. IX. Kinetic studies of mutant histidyl-tRNA synthetases. J. Biol. Chem., 247,2302, 1972
- De Lorenzo, F., Silengo, L. and Cortese, R. Mutagenicity of two widely used pesticides. International Conference on Ecological Perspectives on Carcinogens and Cancer control. Cremona, Settembre 1976
- De Lorenzo, F., Degl'Innocenti, S., Ruocco, A., Silengo, L. and Cortese, R. Mutagenicity of a pesticides containing 1,3-Dichloropropene, Cancer Research, 37, 1915-1917,1977
- N. Staiano, I. Quinto and F, De Lorenzo, Il test della Salmonella per l'identificazione di mutageni chimici: relazione tra struttura chimica e proprietà mutagene. Società Italiana di Biochimica, Urbino, Ottobre 1978
- F. De Lorenzo and I. Quinto, I test di mutagenesi nella valutazione della tossicologia dei farmaci. In: "Nuovi Aspetti di Tossicologia Sperimentale e Clinica" , C.G. Edizioni Medico-Scientifiche, Torino, 1979, pp 33–49
- Martire, G., Vricella, G., Perfumo, A.M. and De Lorenzo, F. "Evaluation of the Mutagenic of Coded Compounds in the Salmonella/Microsome Test. In: Evolution of short-term tests for carcinogens International Collaborative Program. Progress in Mutation Research, vol. I, pp 271-279, 1981.
- I. Quinto, G. Martire, G. Vricella, F. Riccardi, A. Perfumo, R, Giulivo and F. De Lorenzo. Screening of 24 pesticides by the Salmonella/microsome assay: mutagenicity of Benazolin, Metoxuron and Paraoxon. X Annual Meeting of the European Environmental Mutagen Society (EEMS), September 1980, Athens, Greece. Abstract published in: Mutation Res. 85, 265,1981
- I. Quinto, G. Scal, M. Mallardo, M.R. Ruocco and F. De Lorenzo. Spontaneous or mutagen-mediated expression of a promoterless neo gene integrated al different genomic sites of Rat 2 fibroblasts. Atti del UCLA Symposia on Molecular and Cellular Biology "Genomic Instability and Cancer", Febbraio 1991, Tamarron, Colorado, USA, estratto n. J129. Estratto pubblicato in: J. Celi. Biochem., Suppl. 15D, 107, 1991
- M. Sanchez, E. Gionti, G. Pontarelli, A. Arcella and F. De Lorenzo. Regulatation of α2-collagen gene expression in retinoic acid treated quail chondrocytes. Biochemical J., 295, 115-119, 1993

| Preceded by Carlo Donat-Cattin | Minister of Health of Italy; 1989–1993 | Succeeded by Raffaele Costa |
