= Ariston Group =

Italian thermal comfort manufacturing company

Ariston Holding N.V.
- Formerly: Merloni TermoSanitari S.p.A. (1975-2009); Ariston Thermo S.p.A. (2009-2020); Ariston Thermo Holding S.p.A. (2020-2021)
- Type: Public
- Traded as: BIT: ARIS; FTSE Italia Mid Cap
- ISIN: NL0015000N33
- Industry: Home appliance
- Predecessor: Industrie Merloni
- Founded: 1975; 51 years ago
- Founder: Francesco Merloni
- Headquarters: Fabriano, Italy
- Area served: Worldwide
- Key people: Francesco Merloni, honorary chairman; Paolo Merloni, chairman; Laurent Jacquemin, CEO
- Products: Thermal comfort
- Revenue: ▲€1.57 billion (2017)
- Number of employees: 7,000 (2017)
- Website: www.aristongroup.com

Ariston Holding N.V. (formerly known as Merloni TermoSanitari S.p.A., Ariston Thermo S.p.A. and Ariston Thermo Holding S.p.A.), known simply as Ariston, is an Italian multinational operating in the thermal comfort sector, active in the production of solutions for space and water heating, burners and components.

Founded in 1975 through the split of Industrie Merloni into several companies, it is headquartered in Fabriano, the Merloni family's traditional home.

It has been listed on the Milan Stock Exchange since November 2021.

== History ==
=== 1975-2009: Merloni TermoSanitari ===
In 1930, Aristide Merloni founded Industrie Merloni in the Marches and began producing scales.

The production of electric water heaters started in 1960 with the launch of the brand Ariston.

In 1975 Industrie Merloni split into several companies, including Merloni TermoSanitari (MTS Group) and Merloni Elettrodomestici.

During the 1980s the company started manufacturing boilers.

During the 1990s the company opened its first branches in Eastern Europe and Asia. It also acquired Racold, India's largest water heaters' manufacturer, and opened its first wholly owned plant in China.

In 2001, Industrie Merloni acquired the heating and burner companies Chaffoteaux, Elco, Cuenod and Rendamax.

In 2005 Merloni Elettrodomestici changed its name into Indesit Company.

=== 2009-present: Ariston ===
In 2009, the company changed its name to Ariston Thermo Group. It acquired the heat pumps company Termogamma in 2008, the water heating systems Swiss companies Cipag and Domotec in 2011, and the Italian heating company DhE in 2013. A joint-venture was launched in Uzbekistan to launch distribution in this country.

In 2014, Ariston Thermo acquired the water heaters South African company Heat Tech Geysers, inaugurated an electric water heater factory in Vietnam, and acquired the heating industry Dutch company ATAG Heating. In 2015, it acquired the heating Danish company Gastech-Energi, and inaugurated a 10,000 m^{2} logistics center in Vsevolozhsk near St. Petersburg. in 2016, it acquired the condensing boilers Canadian company NY Thermal.

During 2017 the Group completed two further acquisitions, one in the United States of America, where in August Ariston Thermo acquired HTP, a leading company in this market for thermal comfort solutions, and the other in Israel in October acquiring ATMOR Group, a leading company in the technology of electric instantaneous water heaters.

In 2021 changed its name to Ariston Group and has been listed on the Milan Stock Exchange.

== Controversy ==
Following Russia's invasion of Ukraine in 2022 and the resulting international sanctions, Ariston continued operations in Russia and actively hired staff. In April 2024, the Russian government transferred control of Ariston's assets to an entity managed by Gazprom, without notifying the company. This action drew criticism from the Italian government and the European Union, raising concerns over corporate autonomy.

== Description ==
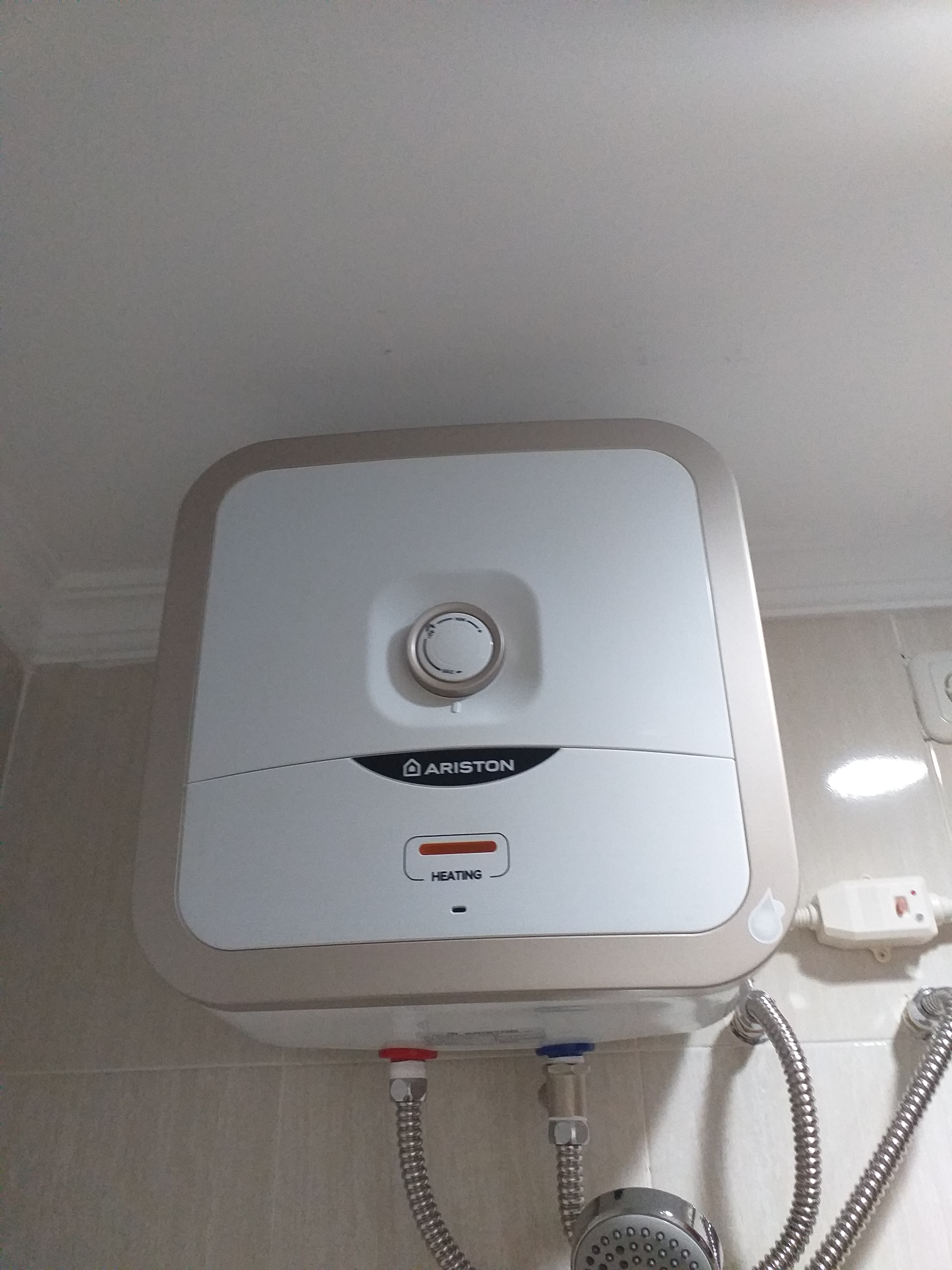
Ariston Water heater

In 2016, Ariston Thermo sold 7 million products in over 150 countries worldwide, amounting to a turnover of 1.43 billion Euro. It employs 6,900 people working in 59 companies, with 8 representative offices in 36 countries.

Ariston owns the following brands and companies: Ariston, Elco Heating Solutions (founded as Emile Looser Company), Chaffoteaux, Racold, Régent, ATAG (ATAG Heating Group founded by Antoon Tijdink and Antoon van Goor), NTI, HTP, Cuenod, Ecoflam, Thermowatt, Wolf Heiztechnik, Hotpoint, Brink Climate Systems, Ned Air, and Calorex.

== See also ==
- Francesco Merloni
- Indesit
- Merloni
