= Mariapia Garavaglia =

Italian politician

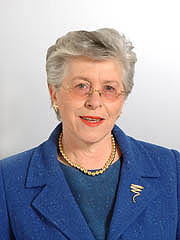

Minister of Health
- In office 28 April 1993 – 10 May 1994
- Prime Minister: Carlo Azeglio Ciampi
- Preceded by: Raffaele Costa
- Succeeded by: Raffaele Costa

Member of the Senate
- In office 29 April 2008 – 14 March 2013
- Constituency: Veneto

Member of the Chamber of Deputies
- In office 20 June 1979 – 14 April 1994
- Constituency: Milan

Personal details
- Born: 10 August 1947 (age 79) Cuggiono, Italy
- Party: DC (till 1994); PPI (1994-2002); DL (2002-2007); PD (since 2007)
- Education: Università Cattolica del Sacro Cuore

Mariapia Garavaglia (born 10 August 1947 in Cuggiono) is an Italian politician and professor, former Italian Minister of Health during the Carlo Azeglio Ciampi government and former Deputy Mayor of Rome. She has been member of the Christian Democracy, of the Italian People's Party, of The Daisy and finally of the Democratic Party. She was extraordinary commissioner and later President of Italian Red Cross. She is also director for international programs of the Italy-USA Foundation.

== Biography ==
Graduated in Literature and Political Sciences at the Catholic University of the Sacred Heart of Milan, she has always dedicated herself to teaching and voluntary activities in the health and social sector. She was a teacher of Letters at high schools. She is a contract professor at the Faculty of Psychology of the Sapienza University of Rome. In the academic years 1996-2007 she held seminars at the Bioengineering Department of the Polytechnic University of Milan. She carries out training and advertising activities in newspapers and periodicals and has published books on health and bioethical issues.

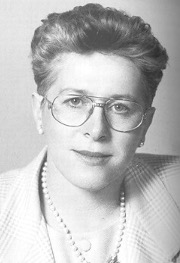
Mariapia Garavaglia in 1992

In 1979 she was elected to the Chamber of Deputies for the Constituency of Milan and Pavia. Garavaglia made news internationally on 27 September 1980, when she was one of two Christian Democracy members who had arrived several minutes too late to participate in voting on her party's economic proposals, a 297 to 298 loss that caused Prime Minister Francesco Cossiga and his government to resign. She was re-elected until 1994. From 1988 to 1992 she served as Undersecretary of the Ministry of Health and from April 1993 to May 1994 she held the position of Minister of Health.

From May 1995 to April 1998 she held the position of Extraordinary Commissioner of the Italian Red Cross, while from April 1998 to October 2002 she was appointed President of the same. From November 1997 to April 2004 she was Vice President of the International Federation of Red Cross and Red Crescent Societies; she was also President of the Coordination between the European Red Cross Societies.

From 2003 to 2008 she served also as Deputy Mayor of Rome.

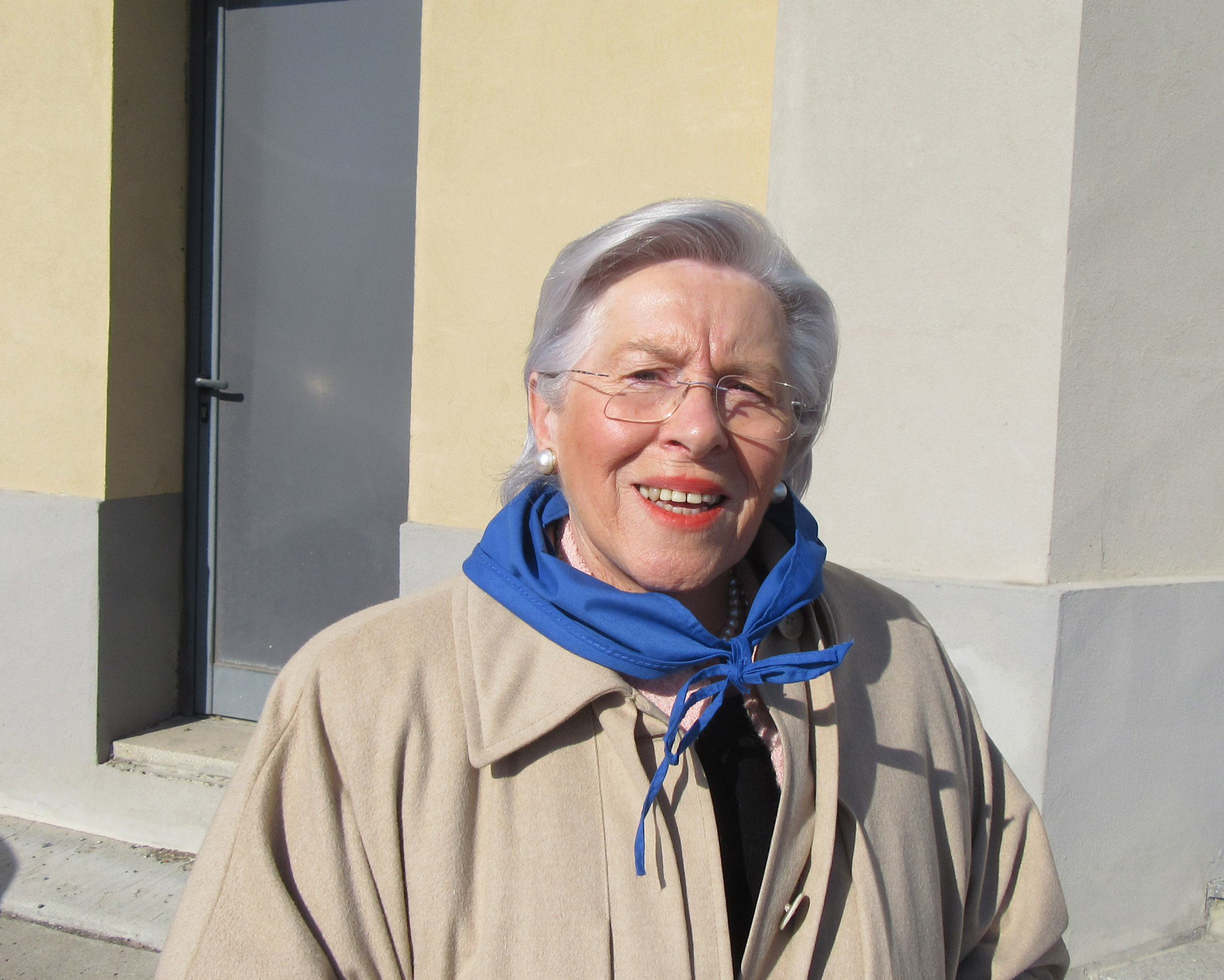
Mariapia Garavaglia in Caselle Landi, 2 April 2023.

In 2008 she was elected to the Senate of the Republic for the Constituency of Veneto among the ranks of the Democratic Party. Member of the "VII Commission of Education, University, Research, Cultural Heritage and Sport" and of the "Special Commission on Human Rights".

== Electoral history ==
Election	House	Constituency	Party	Votes	Result
1979	Chamber of Deputies	Milan–Pavia	DC	36,762	Elected
1983	Chamber of Deputies	Milan–Pavia	DC	51,093	Elected
1987	Chamber of Deputies	Milan–Pavia	DC	56,005	Elected
1992	Chamber of Deputies	Milan–Pavia	DC	36,341	Elected
2008	Senate of the Republic	Veneto	PD	– (Note: Elected in a closed list proportional representation system.)	Elected

Political offices
Preceded by Raffaele Costa	Italian Minister of Health; 1993–1994	Succeeded by Raffaele Costa
Non-profit organization positions
Preceded by Luigi Giannico	Extraordinary Commissioner of the Italian Red Cross; 1995–1998	Succeeded by Staffan de Mistura
Preceded by Angelo Savini Nicci	President of the Italian Red Cross; 1998–2002	Succeeded by Massimo Barra
Party political offices
New title	Shadow Minister of Public Education; 2008–2009	Title abolished
