= Rosa Russo Iervolino =

Italian politician (born 1936)

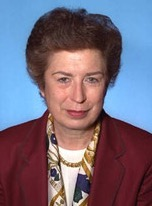
- Iervolino in 1996

Mayor of Naples
- In office 28 May 2001 – 1 June 2011
- Preceded by: Antonio Bassolino
- Succeeded by: Luigi de Magistris

Minister of the Interior
- In office 21 October 1998 – 22 December 1999
- Prime Minister: Massimo D'Alema
- Preceded by: Giorgio Napolitano
- Succeeded by: Enzo Bianco

Minister of Public Education
- In office 28 June 1992 – 10 May 1994
- Prime Minister: Giuliano Amato; Carlo Azeglio Ciampi
- Preceded by: Riccardo Misasi
- Succeeded by: Francesco D'Onofrio

Minister of Labour and Social Policies
- In office 18 March 1991 – 12 April 1991
- Prime Minister: Giulio Andreotti
- Preceded by: Carlo Donat-Cattin
- Succeeded by: Franco Marini

Minister for Social Affairs
- In office 28 July 1987 – 28 June 1992
- Prime Minister: Giovanni Goria; Ciriaco De Mita; Giulio Andreotti
- Preceded by: Office established
- Succeeded by: Adriano Bompiani
Parliamentary offices
Member of the Chamber of Deputies
In office 15 April 1994 – 30 May 2001
Constituency	Naples
Member of the Senate of the Republic
In office 20 June 1979 – 14 April 1994
Constituency	Rome (1979–1983); Lanciano–Vasto (1983–1994)

Personal details
- Born: Rosa Jervolino; 17 September 1936 (age 90) Naples, Kingdom of Italy
- Party: Italian Socialist Party (2024–)
- Other political affiliations: DC (1968–1994); PPI (1994–2002); DL (2002–2007); PD (2007–2017); Centre-left independent (2017–2024)
- Height: 1.68 m (5 ft 6 in)
- Spouse: Vincenzo Russo (m. 1964; died 1985)
- Children: 3
- Parents: Angelo Raffaele Jervolino (father); Maria De Unterrichter (mother)
- Profession: Lawyer

Rosa Russo Iervolino (born Rosa Jervolino, 17 September 1936) is an Italian politician.

== Biography ==
Iervolino was born to Angelo Raffaele Jervolino (1890–1985) and Maria De Unterrichter (1902–1975), a native of Trentino, on 17 September 1936. Her parents were both Christian Democracy parliamentarians. Her uncle was Südtiroler Volkspartei senator Guido De Unterrichter (1903–1979). She would go on to get a degree in law and begin practising as a lawyer. The philosopher and politician Domenico Jervolino (1946–2018) was her cousin.

She married Vincenzo Russo on 26 October 1964. Aldo Moro was her witness. They had three children (Michele, Maria Cristina and Francesca). Her husband died before her fiftieth birthday. Her surname was later rendered as Iervolino (with an I instead of a J) and put beside her husband's surname.

Iervolino was leader of the Christian Democratic Women group from 1968 to 1978. She served as a member of the Italian Senate as a Christian Democrat (Democrazia Cristiana; DC), starting in 1979 as part of legislature VIII to 1994 in legislature XI when she resigned. She was elected for her first Senate term representing Lazio, but would represent Abruzzo for the remainder of her term as a Senator. She would also serve in the Chamber of Deputies for two terms, between 1994 and 2001.

She was the Minister of Public Education (1992–1994) and the first woman to become Minister of the Interior in Italy (1998–1999).

Following the dissolution of the DC, Iervolino joined the Italian People's Party (PPI) in 1994, and together with her fellow party members was a member of the Olive Tree coalition. She ran as a candidate for Mayor of Naples in the 2001 municipal election for the centre-left coalition, and she won with 53% of the votes. She would become the first female mayor of the city. On 29 May 2006, she was confirmed with over 57% of the votes. She would subsequently go on to join the Democratic Party (PD).

== Legal Issues ==
In February 2013, Iervolino was charged by the Court of Audits, alongside other former mayors such as Antonio Bassolino. Each former mayor was charged with € 560,893 for wasting money on 'useless recruits.'

== Electoral history ==
Election	House	Constituency	Party	Votes	Result
1979	Senate of the Republic	Rome VIII	DC	44,811	Elected
1983	Senate of the Republic	Lanciano–Vasto	DC	49,659	Elected
1987	Senate of the Republic	Lanciano–Vasto	DC	50,673	Elected
1992	Senate of the Republic	Lanciano–Vasto	DC	51,422	Elected
1994	Chamber of Deputies	Campania 1	PPI	– (Note: Elected in a closed list proportional representation system.)	Elected
1996	Chamber of Deputies	Naples Fuorigrotta	PPI	38,581	Elected

=== First-past-the-post elections ===
1996 general election (C): Naples — Fuorigrotta
Candidate	Coalition	Votes	%
Rosa Russo Jervolino	The Olive Tree	38,581	58.9
Domenico Falco	Pole for Freedoms	26,930	41.1
Total		65,511	100.0

Preceded by Riccardo Misasi	Italian Minister of Public Instruction; 1992–1994	Succeeded by Francesco D'Onofrio
Preceded by Giorgio Napolitano	Italian Minister of the Interior; 1998–1999	Succeeded by Enzo Bianco
Preceded by Antonio Bassolino	Mayor of Naples; 2001–2011	Succeeded by Luigi de Magistris
