= Francesco Merloni =

Italian engineer and politician (1925–2024)

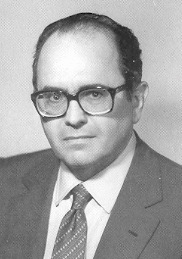

Minister of Public Works
- In office 28 June 1992 – 9 May 1994
- Prime Minister: Giuliano Amato; Carlo Azeglio Ciampi
- Preceded by: Giovanni Prandini
- Succeeded by: Roberto Maria Radice

Member of the Senate
- In office 25 May 1972 – 4 July 1976
- In office 22 April 1992 – 14 April 1994

Member of the Chamber of Deputies
- In office 4 July 1976 – 22 April 1992
- In office 9 May 1996 – 29 May 2001

Personal details
- Born: 17 September 1925 Fabriano, Italy
- Died: 1 October 2024 (aged 99) Fabriano, Italy
- Party: DC (until 1994); PPI (1994–2002)
- Spouse: Cecilia Lazzarini
- Parent: Aristide Merloni (father)
- Education: University of Pisa

Francesco Merloni (17 September 1925 – 1 October 2024) was an Italian industrialist, engineer and politician who was a member of the Christian Democrats. He served as the minister of public works from 1992 to 1994. He chaired Merloni Termosanitari until 2011.

== Early life and education ==
Merloni hailed from a family who founded the Merloni group and created the brand, Ariston, among the others. He was born in Fabriano on 17 September 1925. He held a degree in industrial engineering from the University of Pisa in 1953.

== Career ==
After graduation Merloni began his career in the family company, Merloni, in 1954 and worked there until 1972. From 1972 to 1998 he was elected to the Italian senate. He was a Christian Democrat senator until 1992. He also served as a member of the Parliament. In the elections of 1976, 1979, 1983 and 1987 he was elected deputy with the Christian Democrats.

He was the public works minister in the cabinet led by Prime Minister Giuliano Amato from 28 June 1992 to 27 April 1993. He retained his post in the next cabinet led by Prime Minister Carlo Azeglio Ciampi from 28 April 1993 to 9 May 1994. In the general elections in 1996, he was elected to the Parliament with the Olive Tree Alliance.

He led the Ariston Thermo Group until 2011. He was the honorary chairman of the group. In addition, he was the president of the Aristide Merloni Foundation, the national president of the UCID (Christian Union of Entrepreneurs and Managers) and vice president of AREL (Research and Legislation Agency).

== Personal life and death ==
Merloni married Cecilia Lazzarini, and they had three children. Merloni's son, Paolo, is also a businessman. He died in Fabriano on 1 October 2024, at the age of 99.

== Honours and awards ==
Merloni was awarded the Knight Grand Cross Order of Merit of the Italian Republic in 1994. He was honored by Prix France Italie as best Italian entrepreneur of the year in France in 2003.
