= Oliviero Zuccarini =

Italian political journalist and Republican Party(1882–1977)

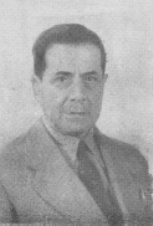
- Oliviero Zuccarini
- Born: 24 August 1883; Cupramontana (Ancona), Marche, Italy
- Died: 19 April 1971; Rome, Italy
- Occupations: Political journalist Author; Labour rights activist Politician; Party secretary Assemblea Costituente member
- Political party: PRI
- Parents: Tito Zuccarini (father); Matilde Umani (mother)

Oliviero Zuccarini (24 August 1883 – 19 April 1971) was an Italian political journalist and Republican Party official and activist. He was arrested for antifascist activities in 1926, and though he was soon released, he remained under close police surveillance. He continued to live in Rome but kept a very low profile till after the fall of fascism. In 1946, however, he was elected a member of parliament. In the light of his background and record before 1926, he might have been expected to emerge as a leading Republican Party figure in the Chamber of Deputies, but he quickly became marginalised within the party, remaining a member of parliament for fewer than two years.

Zuccarini's republicanism was of the traditional Mazzinian variety, steeped in radicalism, anti-clericalism and uncompromising anti-monarchism. Political allies who found him resistant to compromise also criticised his excessively theoretical and romanticised approach to politics. Like Mazzini himself, Zuccarini sometimes found himself reproached for his curiously utopian brand of republicanism. According to one commentator, Oliviero Zuccarini's political philosophy amounted to an internationalist and idealistic form of republicanism that placed him somewhere between Mazzini, Mill and Sorel.

== Biography ==
=== Provenance and early years ===
Oliviero Zuccarini was born into a large and growing family at Cupramontana, a small hill town a short distance inland from Ancona. Tito Zuccarini, his father, was an agricultural smallholder. Oliviero moved to Rome in order to complete his university studies and emerged in due course with a degree in jurisprudence. His interest in politics and current affairs dated back to his childhood. During 1897 he followed closely the newspaper report of the unfolding Greco-Turkish War. Closer to home, in the Kingdom of Italy, he became fascinated by the spread of republicanism during the final decade of the nineteenth century and culminated in the assassination at Monza of the (by this time conspicuously conservative) king. In 1900 Zuccarini began to contribute articles to L'Italia del Popolo, a daily newspaper base (at his stage) in Milan which drew its republican inspiration from earlier newspapers of the same name and from the still widely influential political-philosophical writings of Giuseppe Mazzini. He also set up a "Bovio Group" in Cupramontana, a "study and propaganda circle" which, in 1901, mutated into a local branch of the Republican Party. He quickly grew into a committed journalist-commentator, concentrating in particular on issues impacting small farming communities in his home, the "Marche" region. His approach was considered "moderately progressivist". Publications he contributed to at this stage included "Libertà economica", based in Bologna; "Popolano", published in Cesena; and Napoleone Colajanni's "Rivista Popolare". Increasingly alarmed by the growth of statism, in 1903 he founded a "Società del libero pensiero" (loosely, "Society of Free Thought"), and the following year successfully stood for election to the local municipal council. The list of political journals to which he contributed became longer as he intensified his journalistic war on economic state dirigism. "Libertà economica" seems to have been the publication to which he remained most committed during this period.

=== Political activist ===
Zuccarini became, in effect, a full-time political activist in 1907 when he took on the post of secretary of the regional republican association at Cesena, in the adjacent region of Emilia-Romagna, focusing, principally, on trades union matters. He took on as editorial director at "Popolano", the Cesena-based political journal to which he had already been contributing for some years. He also took a lead in mediation attempts in differences that had arisen between farmworkers who were employed according to a form of sharecropper arrangement and those who were employed as wage labourers. The differences were mirrored in differences between republicanism and socialism. In 1910 he relocated back to Rome and became editor for the region of "Ragione", a political periodical directed by Ubaldo Comandini. Again, his contributions dealt with trades union issues. He became a member of the General Council of the "Chambers of Labour" ("Camere del Lavoro"), a national umbrella grouping with some of the characteristics of a twentieth-century national trades union congress/federation. Over the next couple of years in Rome, within the Italian Republican Party, Zuccarini built an increasingly effective political partnership with his fellow freemason Giovanni Conti. Together, the two men worked to give new impetus to the republican periodical publication "Il Attesa", with the dual objectives of opposing the policies of the Giolitti government and creating a new direction for the Republican Party.

At the 1910 biennial party congress in Florence, delegates elected Zuccarini general secretary of the party's "Social Action Committee", a new body which had been created at Zuccarini's own instigation. With Italy undergoing rapid industrialisation and a correspondingly rapid growth in factory work at the expense of farm labour, the Social Action Committee was a timely initiative which attracted new support to the party from working-class members who would otherwise have been "lost" (as many still were) to socialism. Over the next couple of years Zuccarini and Conti, supported by like-minded party colleagues, were able to consolidate their influence with party cadres, encouraging support for the party's Mazzinian ideals and opposing the government's colonialist "Libyan enterprise". Increasingly the two men came to be seen as leaders of what some characterised as the party's "intransigent faction", in opposition to a more cautious and moderate wing represented by men such as Salvatore Barzilai (also a freemason).

Zuccarini was still not quite 30 in 1912 when he was elected national Party Secretary of the Italian Republican Party at that year's party congress, held at Ancona. Giovanni Conti was elected to the leadership of the party on the same occasion. Over the next couple of years, supported by Conti and other leading party figures such as Eugenio Chiesa (himself a former national secretary of the party) and Edoardo Giretti, Zuccarini committed to an energetic programme of renewal for the "Party of Mazzini", with national programmes for national disarmament, administrative decentralisation, tax reform and a series of social reforms such as the introduction of retirement pensions for workers, increased investment in "public works", agricultural incentives and encouragement for the application of "co-operative" business models.

=== War years ===
When war broke out in July 1914 involving Germany and France, the Italian government let it be known that it was ill-prepared to participate. There was no rush to line up in the trenches alongside the country's Triple Alliance allies. During the second half of 1914, Italian volunteer legions nevertheless emerged and travelled to France to join the French army in its battles against the "Central Powers", with Zuccarini among them. Meanwhile, the Italian government came under intensifying pressure to join the fighting. For almost a year, it remained far from clear whether the country would become embroiled in the war and which side it would back if it did. Despite treaty obligations to fight on the side of the Austro-Hungarian Empire, there were powerful historical memories across most of Italy of colonial subservience to Vienna during the decades before 1860. Nevertheless, domestic opinion was divided. For socialists and liberals, France was a democracy and therefore had to be supported against the empires of central Europe. For equal and opposite reasons, the instincts of many conservative monarchists and nationalists would have led them to support the German and Austrian empires. When, in April 1915, Italy did join the war, it was partly in response to treaty promises by the British, who were already fighting in alliance with the French, promising that Italy would gain territory by fighting alongside the British and the French. The treaty promises remained secret till after the war was over. In the meantime, Oliviero Zuccarini had already emerged in 1914 as a passionate interventionist in support both of "the democracies" and in pursuit of a quasi-Mazzinian vision of "Pan-European Federalism", derived from a long-standing strand of political thought among Italian intellectuals mistrustful of government from Rome. In August 1916 Zuccarini joined the Italian army, which meant resigning his post as national secretary of the Republican Party. It is not clear from the competing sources whether he volunteered for military service or was conscripted. He continued to serve in the army till 1919.

=== Post-war activism ===
During the first ten years of the twentieth century the Italian Republican Party experienced a progressive electoral collapse, most obviously in the expanding industrial cities. A vote share of more than 6% in the 1900 Italian general election had fallen to 2% in 1913. After the war, in the election of 1919, the Republicans received less than 1% of the popular vote. The future, as it must have seemed at the time, belonged to the Socialists. Oliviero Zuccarini remained true to the Republican cause, which in terms of mainstream Italian politics correlated with marginalisation. He had nevertheless had the opportunity presented by the war years to hone his own political philosophy. Liberty and property rights were central to his vision for a renewal of a state that aspired to become a "republic as a government over autonomies" (Note: ... "alla Repubblica come al governo delle autonomie") His ideas found new life in "Critica Politica", a political journal which he launched in 1921 and in which he elaborated his prescription for a new state structure. Through the magazine he was able to gain an important foothold in the post-war political debate. His co-contributors to the journal included a number of well-known intellectuals, drawn from a surprisingly wide range of backgrounds. Prominent among them was the respected economist-sociologist Vilfredo Pareto. Some others were the socialist pioneer Arcangelo Ghisleri, the precocious radical Piero Gobetti, the leftist lawyer Guglielmo Pannunzio, and the Mazzinian historian Gaetano Salvemini. After 1922, "Critica Politica" fell victim to a government campaign of sustained disruption and seizures, and its publication eventually came to an end in 1926.

During the early 1920s Zuccarini produced three substantial political essays which were published as small books:

- 1920: "Pro e contro il bolscevismo" ("Pros and cons of Bolshevism") dealt with themes that had been preoccupying many thoughtful Europeans in the aftermath of the October Revolution
- 1921: "Il partito repubblicano dopo la guerra. La crisi e la rinascita" ("The Republican Party after the war: crises and rebirth")
- 1922: "Influenze mazziniane nel movimento operaio" ("Mazzinian influences on the labour movement") ran to four editions, and appears to have been the best-selling of Zuccarini's three political books from this period

Between 1920 and 1926 Oliviero Zuccarini faced a succession of court actions, initially on account of the "anti-monarchist propaganda" he was deemed to be producing and then, after 1922, on account of "political activity" in opposition to the Mussolini dictatorship. After April 1926 he was subjected to close government surveillance and took an indefinite leave of absence, which amounted to a resignation from his party role. In November 1926 he received but turned down a pressing invitation to join a "fascist corporation". He was arrested on 26 December 1926 and determined to be in possession of anti-government propaganda. He was released shortly afterwards, but the government surveillance intensified in ways which ensured that he could not undertake further journalism work. Between 1926 and 1944, Zuccarini continued to live in Rome, but there is no indication that he was involved in further acts of deemed antifascism.

One last contribution before Zuccarini was silenced by the Mussolini government was an essay published in Rome by "Libreria politica moderna" in 1926, under the title "Esperienze e soluzioni: Stato liberale - Stato fascista - Stato repubblicano" ("Experiences and solutions"). Directly following publication, all copies were seized by the authorities. However, it was republished in La critica politica when the journal - banned between 1926 and 1944 – resumed publication.

Despite being described in sources as "an essay", when published in book form, the piece extended to 241 pages, divided into three sections. The author starts by contextualising contemporary politics in what he sees as a continuum between the "liberal experiment" that ended in 1922 and the fascist dictatorship that followed it. He attributes the support for an authoritarian and reactionary régime to the backwardness of the country and the failure to complete what could have become a transformational "liberal revolution". He highlights the simple inefficiency of Italy's ruling class and the enduring presence of an influential "petty bourgeoisie" susceptible to the blandishments of nationalism. And yet, those same people were happy to acknowledge the ideology of labour, a top-down authoritarian modernising agenda and the successes of Rossoni's fascist syndicalism, built on foundations already constructed long before 1922 through the brilliant exploitation of weaknesses in the liberal state. True to the Mazzinian heritage, Zuccarini also brings into the mixture the problematic nature of a labour movement and a reformist brand of socialism that had tended towards collusion with the institutions of a conservative Sardinian-Italian monarchy.

In the view of the man from Cupramontana, the worst outcome of the twenty years of dictatorship would have been something else: "the destruction of Italians' awareness of and pride in their national individuality" (Note: "...«quello di aver distrutto negli italiani il sentimento e l’orgoglio della loro individualità nazionale.) That was because the Mussolini government had sacrificed the spirit of the people in order to feed the needs of their "vast state machine". Men had been transformed into "automata", and patriotic passion had been distilled and habituated into mind-numbing routines. A generation of young people had been raised "without ideals", trained simply to "repeat the same phrases, chant the same hymns, and follow the same mantras".

=== Towards democracy ===
Responding to intensifying political pressure in Rome and the arrival of American and British forces in Sicily, on 25 July 1943 the king finally ordered the arrest of Mussolini. At around the same time, Oliviero Zuccarini resurfaced, with Giovanni Conti still at his side. With the monarchy discredited by its association with fascism, and fascism discredited through involvement in the disastrous German war, the time seemed ripe for a republican revival. Although individual Republican Party members participated in the National Liberation Committee (CLN), there was no appetite on the part of the emerging party leadership for the entire party to become incorporated inside a political grouping tainted by monarchist associations. During 1943/44, as the Italian Republican Party reformed and exiled members began to return from England and America, Conti and Zuccarini emerged as members of the informal party leadership team. Publication of "La Voce Repubblicana" resumed. Through 1944 Zuccarini was prominent with his criticism of the CLN's excessively compliant attitude towards the monarchy. He also opposed the merger into the CLN of the Action Party. He was, in addition, one of those who successfully argued that the constitutional question – of whether the time had come for Italy to become a republic – should be pushed to the top of the party agenda.

As a member of the subcommittee set up in 1944 by the short lived "Ministero per la Costituente", Zuccarini was able to return to another of his preferred themes, reiterating the need to maximise local autonomy and move Italy towards a federalist structure. The issues raised were complex, and the decentralisation of power would involve reversing trends that had been firmly set in place since 1860. In the longer term it can be argued that Italian constitution arrangements would indeed move closer towards the federalist ideals favoured by Zuccarini, but in 1944 it was clear only that his proposals encountered significant resistance. By April 1945 it was becoming evident that the Republican Party was weakened by more fundamental differences over political strategy between Giovanni Conti and Randolfo Pacciardi, while Zuccarini again found himself a somewhat semi-detached member of the party's leadership team. He now focused increasingly to sharing his ideas with readers of La critica politica. His principal themes were the need to strengthen regional autonomy and various issues involving the trades union movement.

=== Parliament ===
During June 1946 Oliviero Zuccarini was elected to membership of the Constitutional Assembly ("Assemblea Costituente della Repubblica Italiana"), mandated to devise and endorse a constitution for the Italian republic. The republican structure was chosen by voters in preference to a continuation of the monarchy in a referendum announced three months earlier and conducted on the same day as the general election, on 2 June 1946. Membership of the Constitutional Assembly was determined by a democratic election, applying proportional representation and a voting system based on party lists. Nationally, the Republican Party (PRI) secured more than 4% of the overall vote. In Electoral District 18 (Marche), Oliviero Zuccarini's name was high enough on the PRI list to secure him a seat in the assembly. He also became a member of the assembly's Commission for the Constitution, reflecting his membership of its precursor body. Nevertheless, his carefully detailed scheme for reorganising and devolving regional-level government and his passionate commitment to federalist decentralisation was only peripherally evident in the commission report, which formed the basis for "Titolo V" ("Section 5") of the constitution approved by the assembly in December 1947.

=== Beyond parliament ===
When the Constitutional Assembly was replaced in 1948 by a new parliament, Zuccarini was no longer a member of the chamber. He continued to serve as a member of the PRI leadership team from outside the parliament for several years, however. He shared his ideas as editorial director of "La Voce Repubblicana" till 1950 On matters involving party policy and, even more, strategy, he frequently found himself in opposition to Ugo La Malfa and Randolfo Pacciardi who by this time had become the most powerful members of the party leadership Nevertheless, despite his contrarian habits, Zuccarini was not without influence of his own He effectively launched his own "alternative republican party identity", committed to constitutional federalism and liberal economics Broadly based coalition governments became the norm due to the politically fragmented nature of centrist politics, and with the PRI habitually present as an element in government coalitions, Zuccerini made it his business to encourage party colleagues to support causes and decisions reflective and respectful of what were seen as the party's Mazzinian traditions Despite the perceived threat to democratic liberties represented by Italy's Soviet-backed Communist Party, Zuccarini was acutely cautious about Italy becoming a member of the so-called "Atlantic Pact" (of which the country was nevertheless a founding member in 1949) He would have preferred to wait for the emergence of some sort of pan-European federalist structure to complement and replace the nation-states which had provided the framework for two "world wars" in the space of a single generation. Within Italy, he used the columns of Critica politica to call for a complete reconstruction of the party landscape, with the fragmented centrist groupings replaced by a powerful "third force" that could have the power finally to check the dirigist statism which, for Zuccarini, still represented a major threat to democratic and individual freedoms He continued to press for maximum devolution of political power to the regions. He called for a return of morality to public life and for a simplification of administrative processes which might facilitate it He called for the practical implementation of social reforms, "senza demagogia e senza debolezze" (loosely, "without demagoguery or weakness"). His impressively coherent programme for a liberal federalist republican future brought him into ever more direct confrontation with the tight-knit group around Ugo La Malfa, who took control of the party secretariat in 1949. The catalyst for Oliviero Zuccarini's resignation from the party came in 1952 in arguments arising during the build-up to proposals for the "Legge Truffa" (fraud law) which, if implemented, would have given additional parliamentary seats to political parties winning the most seats in general elections. By strengthening the government's position in parliament, the idea was to deliver in Italy the level of political stability which, at that time, was associated with England and America; but the law would also have represented a major retreat from democratic purity. In the event, it was not just Mazzinian idealists who were horrified: enough politicians (and commentators) were appalled by the proposals to ensure that the "Legge Truffa" was withdrawn and revoked after just three months. Zuccarini's was not the only significant resignation triggered by disagreements over the "Legge Truffa" proposals; the day after resigning from the party, he teamed up with a group of fellow republican dissidents, many of whom took their lead from Marcello Morante. That was only the start of a political realignment which might yet have led to the creation of the powerful "third force" that Zuccarini had been advocating for years.

The "Unione di Rinascita Repubblicana", of which Morante and Zuccarini were the most prominent members, went on to join up with groups of other free-spirited but disenchanted former members of centrist parties (widely defined), including the former government leader Ferruccio Parri, to form the "Unità Popolare" / UP (party), which had its formal launch in April 1953. But it became clear in the general election ten weeks later that the "Unità Popolare" / UP had found very little traction with voters. The leaders of the "Unità Popolare" / UP nevertheless persisted with their project for half a decade. However, in 1956, following a dispute over candidate selection, Zuccarini resigned from the UP Executive Committee and thereby from any leadership role within it. As he resigned, he shared with readers a characteristically withering assessment that UP had not been "a [political] party but [merely] a movement". The contrast with what he had hoped for could have become a meeting point for Italy's true democrats not prepared to tolerate the political and social rebirth which the country so badly needed.

During the final months of 1957 the UP finally melted away. Some of its members joined the Socialists. Others, including, in 1958, Zuccarini, returned to their former parties. Within the Republican Party, he was, as before, an isolated figure, mistrusted by the party leadership, but respected by some for his intellectual rigour and the consistency of his commitment to his political beliefs. In 1959 he launched a small-scale newspaper, "Noi Repubblicani" (loosely, "Us Republicans"), which he directed, wrote, and authored in virtual solitude. He used its pages to continue the fight for the political causes that remained dear to his hea:t administrative decentralisation, social justice and the labour movement.

In 1965, after seventeen years during which he had been completely disengaged for the work of party congresses, Oliviero Zuccarini participated ainthe twenty-ninth congress of the Republican Party, contributing actively to a party paper on "Republican Autonomy". he project was opposed by the party leadership around Ugo La Malfa, and the paper was filed by the party as a "minority report". he majority party line of the Italian Republican Party meant restricting democratic commitment to what went on inside parliament. he focus of party policy was to be io industrial development and economic issues. rom Zuccarini's perspective, and that of his admirers, traditionalist Mazzinian republicanism had lost the war for the party's soul. evertheless, Zuccarini's lonely voice in support of local autonomy and the resolving if social problems continued to be raised in the columns of "Noi Repubblicani" till April 1970.

=== More books ===
Two further monographs which Zuccarini wrote, published as small, passionately reasoned books, which appeared only after the war ended, deserve a mention:

- 1946: "Il mio socialismo" ("My socialism")
- 1957: "Un impegno costituzionale" ("A constitutional commitment")

=== Death ===
Oliviero Zuccarini continued to participate very publicly in the political debate almost till the end of his life. He died on 17 April 1971 Sources differ over whether he died in Cupramontana, where he had been born, or in Rome, where he had lived and worked for most of his life.
