= Eugenio Reale =

Italian politician

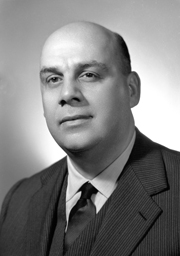
- Reale, 1948

Member of the Constituent Assembly
- In office 25 June 1946 – 31 January 1948
- Constituency: Naples

Personal details
- Born: 8 June 1905 Naples, Italy
- Died: 9 May 1986 (aged 80) Rome, Italy
- Party: PCI (1926–56); PSDI (1956–60); UDNR (1960s)

Eugenio Reale (Naples, 8 June 1905 – Rome, 9 May 1986) was an Italian politician.

== Early life and activism ==
Born into a bourgeois family, very close to the Neapolitan aristocracy, Eugenio Reale graduated during the period when Fascism began to take hold of Italy’s institutions. In 1926 he approached the Italian Communist Party (PCI) and in 1931, after the exile of Giorgio Amendola, he became one of the main party leaders in the city of Naples. On January 27, 1932 he was sentenced by a special court to 10 years in prison for Communist activity but a 1937 pardon allowed him to be released from prison before the expiry of the sentence; he thus resumed the clandestine activity of anti-fascist propaganda and in October of the same year he moved to France, where he became editor of the newspaper La Voce degli Italiani.

He was arrested again and interned in the Camp Vernet. In 1942 he was tried in Toulouse for the re-establishment of the communist international; in April 1943 he was extradited to Italy where he finally began a political career after the fall of Fascism. It was Reale who welcomed Palmiro Togliatti to Naples in 1944 with Salvatore Cacciapuoti and Maurizio Valenzi on his return from the USSR after his exile, and hosted him at his house. Togliatti became a personal friend and political adviser. The secretary of the PCI gave him sensitive him delicate assignments such as commercial relations with the countries of Eastern Europe in order to finance the party through commissions on each deal.

== Political career ==
Reale was elected a member of the High Court of Justice in September 1944. Member of the National Council from 25 September 1945 to 24 June 1946, he was appointed Undersecretary of State for Foreign Affairs during the Bonomi II government, the Parri government and the De Gasperi I government.

He was appointed ambassador to Poland in September 1945 (where he married Sulamita Kacyzne, who as to be his lifelong companion), and was a member of the communist party delegation (with Luigi Longo) at the meeting in Szklarska Poręba which founded the Cominform.

In June 1946 he was elected to the Constituent Assembly for the PCI from the district of Naples. During the De Gasperi III government he was again Undersecretary of State for Foreign Affairs from 6 February 1947 to 31 May 1947. In 1948 he was elected to the Senate of the Republic and remained a senator until 1953.

== After leaving the PCI ==
Reale left the PCI controversially in 1956 because of the support that the party gave to the Soviet invasion of Hungary. The provincial secretariat of the Neapolitan Communist Party denounced him for bourgeois deviationism and expelled him.

Reale believed that the party's priorities were no longer the fight against fascism or for freedom, but mere loyalty to the USSR. His sympathies therefore came to lie more with socialist and social democratic tendencies, and as a result he joined the Italian Democratic Socialist Party (PSDI). In 1957 he founded the weekly Corrispondenza Socialista with Giuseppe Averardi. Later he developed a strong aversion towards the PCI and towards Togliatti in particular, so much that he was known as "the man who challenged Togliatti".

In the sixties he distanced himself from the social democrats and became aligned with the movement of Randolfo Pacciardi, known as the Democratic Union for the New Republic (UDNR), which fought for a presidential and anti-communist constitutional state arranged along the lines of the Gaullist Fifth Republic in France. In the seventies there was talk of his proximity to the resistance committees of Edgardo Sogno, who thought of appointing him Minister of the Interior in a government that he planned to form after staging a “white coup”. Twenty years later, in 1997, Sogno read out his list of possible ministers in a radio broadcast, including Reale's name. In reality however, Reale never met Edgardo Sogno: on the contrary, he abhorred his "coup" project.

== Decorations ==
- Commander’s Cross with Star, Order of Polonia Restituta (26 November 1946, by resolution of the Presidium of the State National Council)
