= Italia Libera (anti-fascist organization) =

Political Organization

- Established: June 1923
- Founder: Randolfo Pacciardi
- Dissolved: January 1925
- Type: Veterans' organization
- Purpose: World War I veterans' advocacy, opposition to Fascism
- Location: Rome, Italy
- Members: 15,000 (1924)
- Publication: L'Italia libera
- Parent organization: Italian Republican Party (de facto)

Italia Libera was an Italian veterans' organization.

It was established after World War I by members of the Italian Republican Party to organize former servicemen who had been supportive of Italy's participation in the conflict but disapproved of the larger Associazione Nazionale Combattenti (ANC) and its sympathies towards Benito Mussolini's government.

After the assassination of Giacomo Matteotti it was one of the few groups which planned for armed resistance against Fascism, and would be one of the first organizations to be banned under the dictatorship.

== Notable members ==
- Randolfo Pacciardi
- Giovanni Conti
- Raffaele Rossetti
- Emilio Lussu
- Carlo Rosselli
- Piero Calamandrei
- Ernesto Rossi
- Peppino, Ricciotti Jr., and Sante Garibaldi, grandsons of Giuseppe Garibaldi

== Bibliography ==
- Zani, Luciano (1975). Italia libera : il primo movimento antifascista clandestino (1923-1925) (in Italian). Rome: Laterza. OCLC 2618484.
- Prezioso, Stéfanie (2015). "Fighting Fascism with Its Own Weapons: A Common Dark Side?". Political Violence and Democracy in Western Europe, 1918–1940. pp. 31–47. doi:10.1057/9781137515957_3. ISBN 978-1-349-56920-5.
- "Mussolini to Call Chamber Monday Cabinet Agrees to His Plan of Forcing Discussion of Electoral Reform Bill. ITALIA LIBERA IS HARD HIT 120 Branches Are Shut Down, Says Government's Official Summary of Its Measures". The New York Times. 7 January 1925.
- "Fascists Say Neither Political Party or Govt. Is to Blame for Occurrences of November 4". NewspaperArchive.com. New Britain Herald. Newspaper Archives. 13 November 1924.
- "Italians Face New Election". NewspaperArchive.com. Santa Ana Register. Newspaper Archives. 11 November 1924.
- "The New Cabinet: Extremist Call for Vigorous Repression of Liberalism". The North - China Herald and Supreme Court & Consular Gazette. ProQuest. 10 Jan 1925. ProQuest 1426579232.
- "Ministers at Home Resign in Struggle of Fascists: Substitutes Named By Throne To Fill Cabinet; Milita Parade Maneuvers Staged at Rome to Resist 'Invaders'". The China Press. ProQuest. 7 Jan 1925. ProQuest 1324729233.
