= Angelo Iachino =

Italian admiral

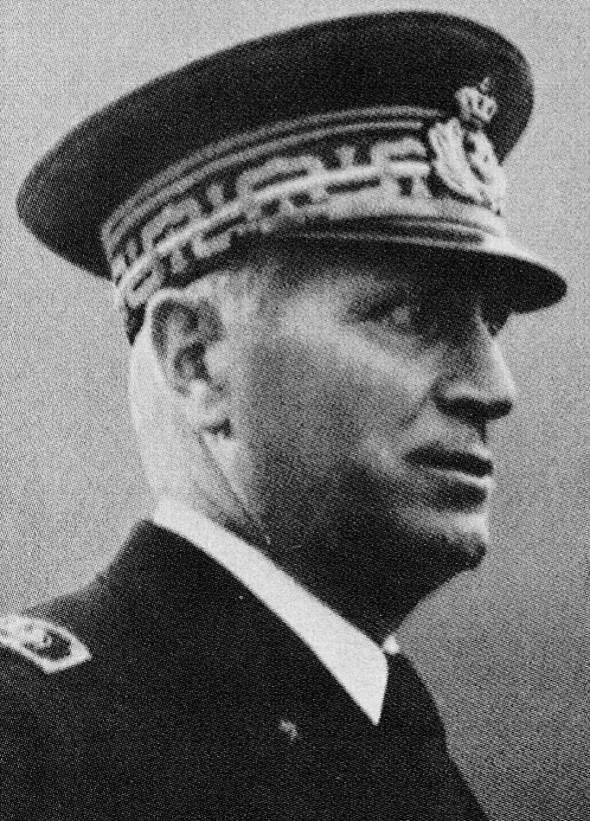
- Born: 24 April 1889; Sanremo, Liguria, Kingdom of Italy
- Died: 3 December 1976 (aged 87); Rome, Lazio, Italy
- Military career
- Allegiance: Kingdom of Italy
- Branch: Regia Marina
- Service years: 1904–1954
- Rank: Ammiraglio d'Armata (Admiral)
- Commands: 66 PN (torpedo boat); Ermanno Carlotto (gunboat); Armando Diaz (light cruiser); Giovanni delle Bande Nere (light cruiser); Italian Naval Academy; 2nd Naval Squadron; Commander in Chief of the Battle Fleet
- Conflicts: Italo-Turkish War; World War I; Adriatic Campaign; Raid on Pula; Spanish Civil War; Italian invasion of Albania; World War II; Battle of the Mediterranean; Battle of Taranto; Battle of Cape Spartivento; Operation Grog; Battle of Cape Matapan; Operation Substance; Operation Halberd; First Battle of Sirte; Second Battle of Sirte; Operation Vigorous
- Awards: Silver Medal of Military Valor (twice); War Cross for Military Valor; War Merit Cross

Angelo Iachino (or Jachino; April 24, 1889 – December 3, 1976) was an Italian admiral during World War II.

== Early life and career ==
Iachino was born in Sanremo, Liguria, in 1889, the son of Giuseppe Iachino, a middle school teacher, and Emilia Piccione. He entered the Italian Naval Academy in Livorno in 1904, and graduated in 1907. In 1911–1912 he participated in the Italo-Turkish War with the rank of Sub-Lieutenant. During World War I he first served on the battleship Giulio Cesare as a lieutenant and then, in July 1917, he was given command of the torpedo boat 66 PN. In this role he participated in several missions in the Adriatic, including, on 31 October 1918, the support to the Raid on Pula (66 PN was to tow near Pola one of the two MAS carrying Raffaele Rossetti, Raffaele Paolucci and their mignatta, but she was forced to abort due to engine problems). For his bravery in combat actions in the Northern Adriatic he was awarded the Silver Medal of Military Valor in November 1918.

From 1923 to 1928 he served in China as naval attache to the Italian embassy and commanding officer of the gunboat Ermanno Carlotto, stationed in Tianjin; during this period, in 1926, he was promoted to commander. In 1928 he assumed command of a destroyer, and later (after becoming captain in 1932) of the light cruiser Armando Diaz in the early 1930s, during a propaganda cruise abroad. In 1936 he was promoted to Contrammiraglio and in 1938 to Ammiraglio di Divisione; during the Spanish Civil War he was the commander of two groups of light ships. In April 1939, on board the light cruiser Giovanni delle Bande Nere, he participated in the Italian invasion of Albania. In 1939 he became Ammiraglio di Squadra. He also commanded the Livorno Naval Academy for a period.

== World War II ==
In August 1940 Iachino was given command of the 2nd Naval Squadron (consisting of the 1st, 3rd and 7th Naval Divisions), with flag on the heavy cruiser Pola, after its previous commander, Admiral Riccardo Paladini, came down with angina pectoris. In this role, he participated on 27 November 1940 in the Battle of Cape Spartivento. On 9 December 1940 he replaced Admiral Inigo Campioni as commander of the entire battle fleet of the Regia Marina, with flag on the battleship Vittorio Veneto. On 9 February 1941, Iachino led the Italian fleet in the unsuccessful pursuit of the British Force H, after the latter had bombarded Genoa and La Spezia. He again commanded the Italian battle fleet in the Battle of Cape Matapan (26-29 March 1941), which resulted in the biggest defeat ever suffered by the Regia Marina; dismissing reports of nearby British battleships as incorrect or exaggerated, he sent the entire 1st Cruiser Division to the rescue of the stricken cruiser Pola, resulting in the annihilation of the entire division by the three battleships of Admiral Andrew Browne Cunningham's Mediterranean Fleet. His actions during this battle have been the subject of much criticism since then; despite this, Iachino was not relieved of command.

In July and September 1941 Iachino led the fleet in fruitless attempts to intercept British convoys to Malta (Operation Substance and Operation Halberd). During the First Battle of Sirte (16 December 1941) and the Second Battle of Sirte (22 March 1942) the forces under his command clashed with the escorts of British convoys heading for Malta, but despite his superior strength Iachino – concerned about not underestimating the enemy forces (to the point of believing incorrect reports about nonexistent battleships) and avoiding night action, both of which had been his fatal mistakes at Matapan – did not press the attack and was unable to cause significant damage to the convoys, but were later sunk by Axis air attack. Operation Vigorous (12-16 June 1942; known in Italy as the "Battle of Mid June") was instead his most important success; despite the losses caused by air and submarine attacks (the battleship Littorio was torpedoed, and the heavy cruiser Trento was sunk), he kept advancing toward the British convoy sailing from Alexandria to Malta, eventually leading to it aborting its mission and turning back to port.

On 5 April 1943 Iachino was replaced by Admiral Carlo Bergamini as the commander of the Italian battle fleet. At the same time he was promoted to Ammiraglio d'Armata. In 1945 he was transferred to the reserve, but he appealed against this and was restored to active service in 1948. He finally left active service in 1954 and was discharged in 1962.

During his later years he wrote several books about his actions during the war, especially focusing on Matapan and trying to justify his actions in that battle. In 1974 he donated the money for the construction of a Sailor's Monument in Taranto. He died in Rome on 3 December 1976, at the age of 87.
