= White Coup =

Coup plan in Italy. Never implemented

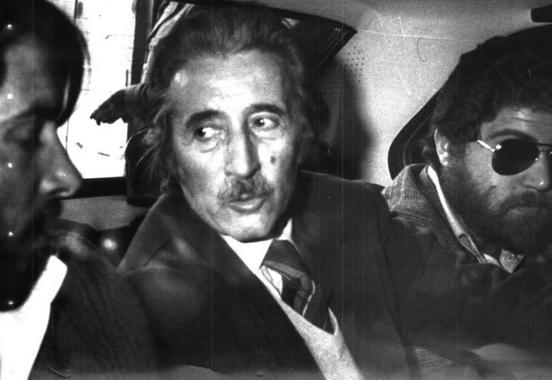
Sogno's arrest in 1976

The White coup (Italian: Golpe bianco) was a planned coup in Italy intended for the summer of 1974, promoted by former anti-fascist and anti-communist partisans. It intended to force the then President of the Republic Giovanni Leone to appoint a government that would proscribe the Italian Communist Party, other communist groups and right-wing groups like the Movimento Sociale Italiano. It would then lead institutional reforms and establish a semi-presidential constitution like that of the Fifth Republic in France. The term "white coup" (alternatively "silent coup" ("golpe silenzioso") or "soft coup" ("golpe morbido") then entered the common language to indicate more generally a coup d'état carried out without recourse to force, by a government that exercises power unconstitutionally.

== Political ideas and plans ==
The main architect of the coup plan was Edgardo Sogno, who stated:

... in the '70s there were people ready to shoot anyone who decided to govern with the communists... Today the DC is careful not to say these things because they are afraid. But we made a commitment to shoot against those who had made the government with the Communists. In the government parties at the time there were also cowards, traitors, ready to govern with the communists... In May 1970, the Committees of Democratic Resistance were founded, whose objective was to prevent the PCI from coming to power by any means, even through free elections... It could not be subjected to any rule, a duel to the death in which we could not accept rules and limits of legality and legitimacy, knowing that we could count on the support of the United States and the other NATO countries.

Sogno was convinced that Italy needed a presidential republic and therefore a constitutional reform similar to that which General Charles de Gaulle had achieved in France with the establishment of the Fifth Republic. He made friends with Randolfo Pacciardi, a former partisan and republican politician, supporter of the presidential republic, and became affiliated with the Freemasonry of the Grand Orient of Italy, associating himself with the P2 Masonic lodge.

After serving as ambassador in several states, Sogno returned to Italy in 1971 and set up the Committees of Democratic Resistance, a series of political centers born with an anti-communist function, to which numerous "white" and "blue" former partisans joined, such as Enrico Martini (commander "Mauri"). Another associate was Enzo Tortora also wrote for the newspaper Resistenza Democratica. In this period Sogno was vice president of the Italian Federation of Freedom Volunteers (FIVL). He made contact with several generals and prepared a plan for the takeover of government, with Pacciardi acting as "the Italian de Gaulle".

== Failure of plot ==
Eventually Minister of the Interior Paolo Emilio Taviani received information about the planned coup and instructed the Chief of Police to investigate; Taviani later said he assumed that this is how information about it came into the possession of the Public Prosecutor's Office of Turin. Defense Minister Giulio Andreotti is credited with hindering the plot by having key military leaders involved transferred from their posts.

In August 1974 an investigating magistrate in Turin, Luciano Violante, accused Sogno of having planned the coup together with Randolfo Pacciardi and Luigi Cavallo "in order to change the Constitution of the State and the form of government with means not permitted by the constitutional order." He claimed that the intended date of the coup had been 15 August 1974. On 27 August Sogno's house was searched. Sogno escaped arrest by fleeing by an ancient secret passage built by his grandfather, Count Sogno Rata del Vallino and he went into hiding.

On 27 January 1975, Violante sought access to correspondence concerning Sogno that was held in the archives of the SID. On 12 February, the SID sent a few redacted pages, stating that "...the missing parts could not be transmitted, because they referred to matters connected to a specific counter-espionage activity...". On 4/6/1975, the Prime Minister Aldo Moro stated that "...the undelivered documents dealt with matters connected to specific counterespionage activities in relation to formal subject data (names of foreign personalities and informants, acronyms of counterintelligence operations.

It was not until 3 May 1976 that Violante was able to have Sogno arrested and he was sent to the Regina Coeli prison together with Luigi Cavallo. Sogno was released on 19 June the same year.

The case was transferred from Turin to an investigating magistrate in Rome. On May 24, 1976, the Roman court confirmed the accusations of Violante and issued two more arrest warrants for Sogno and Cavallo. However, on June 19, the investigating judge Filippo Fiore, following the prosecutor's opinion, placed the two defendants in provisional release. The prosecutor then requested the acquittal of Sogno and Cavallo for lack of evidence and of the other defendants for not having committed any crime. On 12 September 1978 the investigating judge Francesco Amato issued a sentence of acquittal for all the defendants "...because the facts do not support" the accusation.

== 1997 revelations ==
In 1997, Sogno revealed the list of names of those whom the coup intended to install as a government, and of the generals who supported the plan, including Giuseppe Santovito then (head of the "Folgore" mechanized division, later of SISMI); right-wing journalist Giano Accame, socialists hostile to the Communist Party, Christian Democrat elements, and even disillusioned communists who had left the party. According to his memoirs it was a "liberal coup" against the "moderate coalition, the intellectuals, the major economic-financial forces and the Church of the Left" which would have foreseen the formation of an emergency government, in which Pacciardi would assume the office of Prime Minister and Sogno of Foreign Minister or Defense Minister. Once the form of government had changed and the Communists and Fascists had been ousted, the voters would be called on to form a new Parliament and a new Government. The list of "strong government" ministers (read by Sogno in 1997 in a radio broadcast), to be submitted to President Leone with the support of the generals, was as follows:

- Prime Minister: Randolfo Pacciardi (UDNR, ex PRI)
- Undersecretaries to the Prime Minister: Antonio de Martini (UDNR) and Celso De Stefanis (DC)
- Foreign Minister: Manlio Brosio (PLI)
- Minister of the Interior: Eugenio Reale (ex PCI, then PSDI area, who however refused to join)
- Defense Minister: Edgardo Sogno (ex PLI, Committees of Democratic Resistance)
- Minister of Finance: Ivan Matteo Lombardo (ex PSI, later PSDI )
- Minister of Treasury and Budget: Sergio Ricossa (independent, economist)
- Minister of Justice: Giovanni Colli (independent, Attorney General of the Cassation)
- Minister of Education: Giano Accame (independent, former MSI, journalist and writer)
- Minister of Information: Mauro Mita (ex PRI, UDNR)
- Minister of Industry: Giuseppe Zamberletti (diplomat, DC)
- Labor Minister: Bartolo Ciccardini (DC)
- Minister of Health: Aldo Cucchi (ex PCI, then PSDI )
- Merchant Marine Minister: Luigi Durand de la Penne (ex DC and PLI, admiral and only military figure on the list)

== Later revelations ==
Sogno always denied that this plot envisaged the physical elimination of communists, as Norberto Bobbio argued, only a secret but harsh psychological war against them. The adjective "white" itself mainly indicated the fact that - in Sogno's intentions - it would be a peaceful and bloodless breakthrough, and the army would get involved only for defensive purposes. Sogno reiterated in his will that Violante completely missed the target by linking the white coup to neo-fascist massacres: the project existed, but it was a question of "pushing Leone towards the Gaullist turn, not planting bombs," according to him very little compared to the atmosphere of the years of lead and the strategy of tension, with which he said the white coup had nothing to do.

In his 1998 memoirs, Sogno revealed how he had visited the CIA station chief in Rome in July 1974 to inform him of his plans for an anti-communist coup. He wrote: "I told him that I was informing him as an ally in the struggle for the freedom of the west and asked him what the attitude of the American government would be," and then: "He answered what I already knew: the United States would have supported any initiative tending to keep the communists out of government."

In 2000, shortly after Sogno's death, his autobiography was published in which Sogno acknowledged that Violante had correctly understood what the planned coup intended to do. He explicitly admitted that he had worked with Pacciardi, for an "institutional break" "on the Gaullist model". He described this as justified by the duty to "perform a dutiful act, in the defense of democratic freedom and for the reconstruction of the State on its historical foundations of the Risorgimento" (p. 142). Sogno admitted that "it was a political and military operation, largely representative on a political level, and of maximum efficiency on a military level". The coup plotters counted on the sympathy of the United States, which, according to Sogno, would have remained on the sidelines, limiting itself to merely declaring support for "any initiative aimed at keeping the Communists at bay or at a distance from the government" (p. 148).
