= Vittorio Sbardella =

Italian politician (1935–1994)

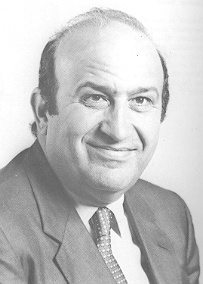
Vittorio Sbardella

Vittorio Sbardella (8 January 1935 – 26 September 1994) was an Italian politician, who was a member of the Italian Chamber of Deputies for Democrazia Cristiana (Italian Christian Democracy) from 1987 until few months before his death. He was nicknamed Lo Squalo ("The Shark").

== Biography ==
Sbardella was born in Rome. During his youth, he was a member of a far-right movement, and later was a member of the Italian Social Movement (MSI, a post-fascist party). Later he moved to the Nuova Repubblica movement led by Randolfo Pacciardi. In the early 1970s he entered Democrazia Cristiana (DC). He became a member of the regional council of the Lazio, and from 1983 to 1986 Sbardella was regional secretary of DC in the Lazio. He was also editor of the weekly Il Sabato (translated, "Saturday").

In 1987 he was elected to the Italian Chamber of Deputies with 125,000 votes, and was reconfirmed in the 1992 elections. Sbardella was a member of the corrente (movement inside DC) led by Giulio Andreotti, but left it after the assassination of Salvo Lima in 1992. Lima had connections with The Mafia, and was allegedly killed due to Andreotti's recent actions as Prime Minister against the Sicilian Cosa Nostra.

Sbardella was involved in the Tangentopoli bribery scandal in the early 1990s. He died of lung cancer in Rome in 1994.

== Sources ==
- Stella, Gian Antonio (27 September 1994). "Sbardella, l'ultimo centurione della DC". Corriere della Sera.
