= Randolfo Pacciardi =

Italian politician (1899–1991)

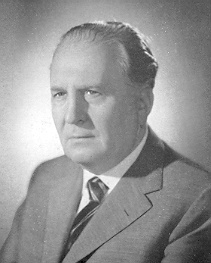

Minister of Defence
- In office 23 May 1948 – 16 July 1953
- Prime Minister: Alcide De Gasperi
- Preceded by: Cipriano Facchinetti
- Succeeded by: Giuseppe Codacci Pisanelli

Deputy Prime Minister
- In office 15 December 1947 – 12 May 1948 Serving with Luigi Einaudi; Giuseppe Saragat
- Prime Minister: Alcide De Gasperi
- Preceded by: Paolo Cappa; Vincenzo Moscatelli
- Succeeded by: Attilio Piccioni; Giovanni Porzio; Giuseppe Saragat

Member of the Chamber of Deputies
- In office 8 May 1948 – 4 June 1968
- Constituency: Pisa (1948–53; 1958–68); Italy at-large (1953–58)

Member of the Constituent Assembly
- In office 25 June 1946 – 31 January 1948
- Constituency: Pisa

Personal details
- Born: 1 January 1899 Giuncarico, Gavorrano, Province of Grosseto, Kingdom of Italy
- Died: 14 April 1991 (aged 92) Rome, Lazio, Italy
- Party: PRI (1915–64; 1980–91); UDNR (1964–80)
- Parent(s): Giovanni Pacciardi, Elvira Guidoni
- Education: University of Siena
- Profession: Lawyer, politician, journalist

Military service
- Allegiance: Italy; Spanish Republic
- Branch/service: Royal Italian Army; International Brigades
- Years of service: 1917–1919; 1936–1939
- Rank: Lieutenant colonel
- Unit: 11th Bersaglieri Regiment; 8th Bersaglieri Regiment; Garibaldi Battalion
- Battles/wars: World War I (1914–1918): Battle of Caporetto (1917); Spanish Civil War (1936–1937): Siege of Madrid; Battle of Jarama; Battle of Guadalajara; Battle of Brunete

Randolfo Pacciardi (1 January 1899 – 14 April 1991) was an Italian politician.

He was a long-time member of the secular, centre-left Italian Republican Party.

An ardent anti-fascist, he lived in exile for many years and was an officer of the International Brigades during the Spanish Civil War. He was later politically active in post-war Italy. His support for various plans to install a presidential republic in Italy during the Cold War has been a source of controversy.

== Biography ==
=== Early life ===
Randolfo Pacciardi was born in Giuncarico, in the province of Grosseto, in southern Tuscany. In 1915 he became a member of the Italian Republican Party. A supporter of Italy's participation in World War I, he enrolled in the officers' school of the Italian Army and took part in the hostilities, receiving two Silver Medals and one Bronze Medal of Military Valor, as well as a British Military Cross and a French Croix de guerre.

=== Resistance to Fascism and exile ===
In 1921 he received a law degree from the University of Siena, and later collaborated with the local newspaper L'Etruria Nuova. He moved to Rome the following year. He was a staunch opponent of the growing violence of Fascist squads and in 1923 established Italia Libera, an anti-fascist veterans' organization. Italia Libera would be one of the few groups to plan for armed resistance to Benito Mussolini in the wake of the assassination of Socialist deputy Giacomo Matteotti, and one of the first opposition group to be banned by the government, in January 1925. As a lawyer he successfully defended the party newspaper La Voce Repubblicana against a defamation lawsuit, after an article had accused high-ranking Fascist Italo Balbo of having ordered the assassination of anti-fascist priest Giovanni Minzoni.

When the Fascists outlawed all rival parties in November 1926, Pacciardi was sentenced to five years of internal exile, but was able to escape to Austria and then to Lugano, Switzerland, with the help of Ernesta Battisti, the widow of Italian patriot Cesare Battisti. While in Switzerland he maintained contacts with the Giustizia e libertà group and offered logistical support to various anti-fascists, including Sandro Pertini, to whom he procured a counterfeit passport, and Giovanni Bassanesi and Gioacchino Dolci, who flew over Milan in July 1930 to throw propaganda leaflets.

In 1933 the Italian government pressured Switzerland to expel all anti-fascist refugees, forcing Pacciardi to relocate to Mulhouse, in the Alsace region of France.

=== Participation in the Spanish Civil War ===
With the outbreak of the Spanish Civil War he helped organize and took the command of the Italian Legion, later renamed Garibaldi Battalion and integrated in the International Brigades, a unit of Italian volunteers fighting in support of the Spanish Republic. Pacciardi's original intent was to organize a non-political volunteer group at direct disposal of the Popular Front government, on the model of the Garibaldi Legion which had helped France in the early phases of World War I. Through the good offices of other exiled anti-fascists like Socialist Pietro Nenni and Communist Luigi Longo he received a hearing from Francisco Largo Caballero in early September 1936, but the Spanish Prime Minister wasn't interested in the proposal and only changed his mind when the Comintern decided to establish the more sizeable and better-funded International Brigades. On 27 October the representatives of the main anti-fascist parties in the exile signed an agreement in the Paris for the establishment of the Garibaldi Battalion. The choice of commander fell on Pacciardi largely due to his military qualifications and a desire to project an image of unity through reliance on a non-Marxist with impeccable anti-fascist credentials.

With the Garibaldi Battalion he took part in the defense of Madrid, the battle of Jarama – where he was wounded – and the final stages of the battle of Guadalajara, and he was considered a successful commander and respected by his men. The battle of Guadalajara, which saw Republicans defeat Italian troops sent by Mussolini, was the first instance of Italians taking part on opposite side of an engagement during the civil war.

While the International Brigades were Communist-dominated, having been organized by the Comintern and strictly supervised by political commissars, in the months of Pacciardi's leadership the Garibaldi Battalion (later Garibaldi Brigade) developed a reputation for political tolerance, hosting communists, socialists, and republicans. It was also the only unit within the Brigades to have a substantial number of anarchists. In May 1937, when the "Garibaldi" was asked to suppress anarchist and POUM fighters in Barcelona as part of internal purges of the Republican camp, Pacciardi instructed acting commander Carlo Penchienati to refuse. His persistent refusal to accept discipline within the normal chain of command, including the authority of political commissars over the appointment of subordinates, and frequent criticism of his superiors, exacerbated differences and fueled attempts to remove him from command or otherwise prevent contacts with his subordinates. Pacciardi also showed little interest in the mixed-nationality nature of most International Brigades, having always preferred a self-sufficient all-Italian unit to "the anonymity of internationalism". Lamenting the lack of autonomy in the face of the integration of all International Brigades in the regular Spanish Army he requested a temporary leave for all Italian volunteers to give them the opportunity to go abroad and recruit among members among Italian emigrants in France and elsewhere, but this was rejected.

During a brief absence Communists tried to engineer his replacement with political commissar Ilio Barontini, but couldn't find enough support within the Spanish government to do so. They also offered him a promotion to division staff, which he turned down. Finally, at the urging of Penchienati and Nenni, Pacciardi accepted the post of vice divisional commander for the duration of the next offensive, as a gesture to improve the unity and morale of the brigade. He finally left Spain for good in October 1937.

Sources more sympathetic to the Communist point of view have also blamed his departure on his adherence to traditional models of military leadership, like the separation between officers' and troops' quarters, as well as the leave request, which has been interpreted as unviable in the context of the war effort or even as an outright proposal to dissolve the brigade rather than accept a reduction of personal authority.

=== World War II ===
Moving to Paris he founded a weekly magazine, La Giovine Italia (named after the Young Italy movement established by Giuseppe Mazzini in the 19th century). Between March and May 1938 he also held a round of lectures in the United States about anti-fascism, with the goal of raising funds for the Spanish Republic.

Forced to flee by the German invasion of France, he and his wife finally reached New York aboard the liner Serpa Pinto on 26 December 1941, after traveling through Algiers, Casablanca and Mexico with false documents. In the United States Pacciardi supported the unsuccessful efforts of the Italian-American Mazzini Society, of which he had been a member since its founding in 1939, to organize volunteer groups to take part in World War II on the Allied side. He also tried to contact Charles de Gaulle, via Pierre Mendès-France, to ask him to attach the prospective units to the Free French Forces. Plans for an Italian Legion however were seriously hampered by recruitment difficulties: the Mazzini Society couldn't count on the same base as De Gaulle, who enjoyed the loyalty of a part of the French military and controlled territory in some French colonies; nor it could hope to recruit most Italian Americans, who would be drafted in the US Armed Forces. Despite his growing dislike of Communism, during this time Pacciardi pursued a line of cooperation and unity between all anti-fascist forces, which was a cause of friction with the rest of the Society and ultimately prompted him to resign his membership.

=== Return to Italy ===
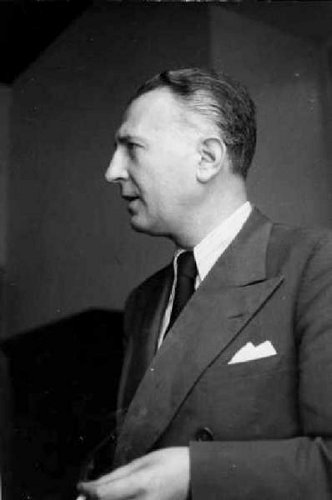
Pacciardi in 1945.

He returned to Italy in June 1944, after the liberation of Rome, immediately becoming a member of the leadership of the re-established PRI. He supported Giovanni Conti's hardline opposition to any form of cooperation with the Italian monarchy, which put Republicans at odds with the other anti-fascist parties, who were organized in the National Liberation Committee and held ministries in the royal government. When pro-monarchist parties withdrew their support from the Parri Cabinet he tried to persuade Parri to remain as Prime Minister, but unsuccessfully. He became national secretary of PRI in 1945 and was elected to the Constituent Assembly of Italy the following year. With the end of the Italian monarchy the Republican Party entered a coalition government for the first time, with Cipriano Facchinetti serving as Minister of War in the De Gasperi II Cabinet.

During the May 1947 government crisis, when De Gasperi removed the Communist (PCI) and Socialist (PSI) parties from the cabinet, at first the PRI withheld support from the new government. The party was actually split between Pacciardi, who advocated continuing cooperation with PCI in line with his beliefs in anti-fascist unity, and Conti and Facchinetti, who blamed Communists for government inefficiency. Initially, the former approach prevailed. By December 1947, however, Pacciardi changed his position due to a growing perception of the Soviet threat, and became deputy Prime Minister along with Liberal Luigi Einaudi and Social Democrat Giuseppe Saragat. After the approval of the Constitution he was elected to Parliament in 1948 and was Defense Minister from 1948 to 1953, supporting Italian membership in NATO despite resistance from factions within his own party. Despite the initial distrust from senior officers, many of whom had fought on the Nationalist side in Spain, he also oversaw Italian rearmament, sought to keep most wartime professionals, re-established a military intelligence service with the creation of SIFAR, and took a number of symbolic measures to enhance the prestige of the Armed Forces that survive to this day, such as the introduction of a yearly military parade on Republic Day and the opening of barracks to the public on National Unity and Armed Forces Day.

He was also an early supporter of European federalism.

=== Presidentialism and coup allegations ===
In the 1950s Pacciardi became aggressively anti-communist. In 1954, during a meeting with US ambassador to Italy Clare Boothe Luce he suggested that the government should have provoked the Communists into using violence to find a pretext to outlaw them. He also became supportive of a presidential system of government, which he believed would be the solution to the instability of Italian politics. After the May 1958 crisis in France he started advocating in private, on several occasions, for a coup d'état that would bypass Parliament and install a government with the task of writing a new, presidentialist Constitution. In July 1959 he met with Luce's successor James Zellerbach and told him that he thought that Italy needed an authoritarian government, with a president with powers modeled on the French Fifth Republic. He also said that he was contemplating launching a movement to "save democracy" in the country, and that his views were supported by some high-ranking members of the Catholic Church like Genoa cardinal Giuseppe Siri. In 1963, when Christian Democratic leader Aldo Moro set up a cabinet that included PSI ministers for the first time in sixteen years, Pacciardi voted against it in dissent with his own party and was expelled from PRI.

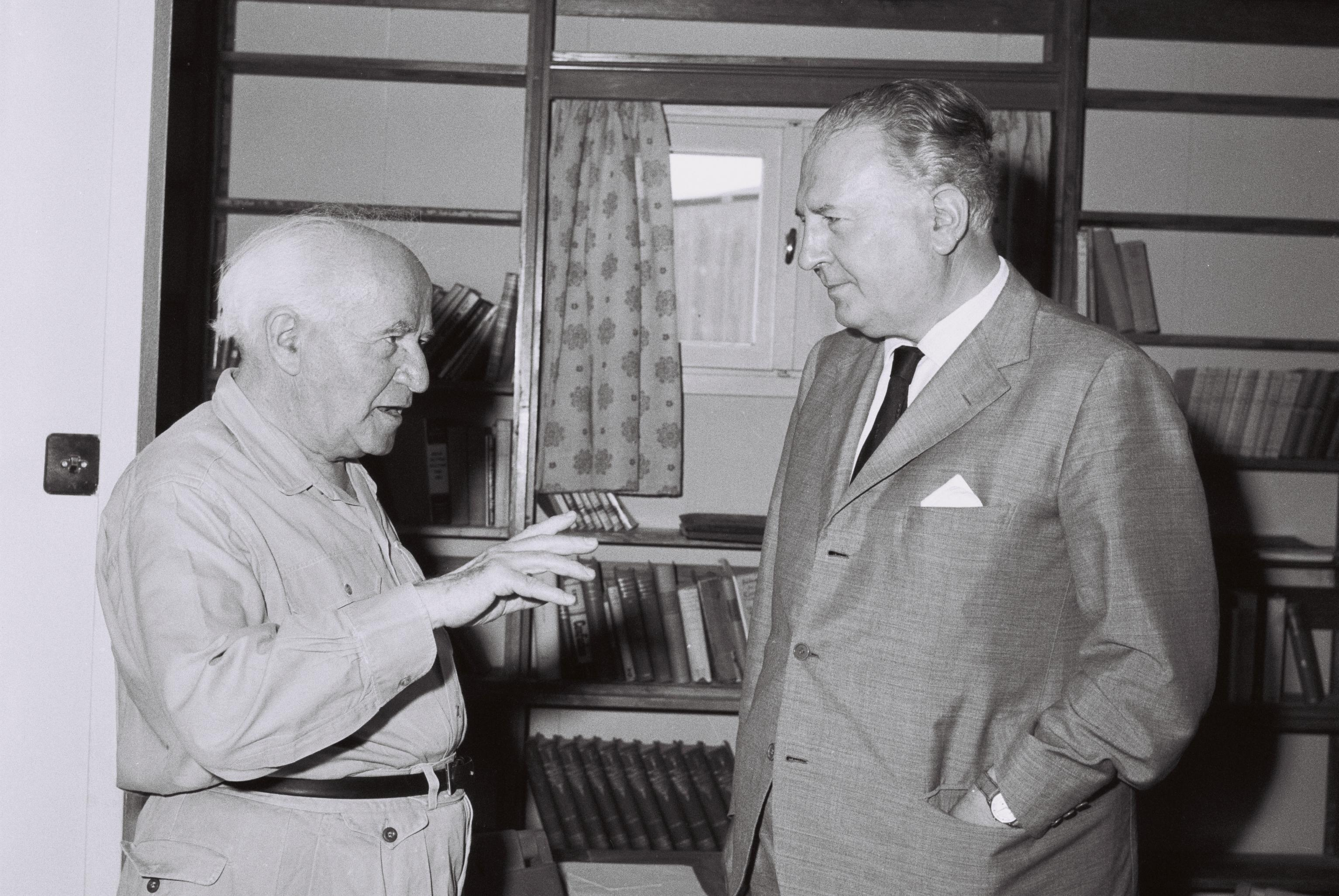
Randolfo Pacciardi and David Ben-Gurion in Sde Boker, 1958

After his expulsion from PRI he founded a new party with a Gaullist-inspired platform, the Democratic Union for the New Republic (UDNR), and the newspaper La Folla. However, his ideas met with little popular support. The 1968 election proved to be a failure for the UDNR, which received just 0.20% of votes nationwide, and elected none of its members to Parliament. While the former Defense Minister could enjoy many connections within political, military and diplomatic circles these were often deemed insufficient to launch an effective takeover. His suggestion that anti-fascist political rhetoric was no longer relevant and should be dropped also attracted the sympathies of a small number of neo-fascists.

His political advocacy continued in the 1970s, as it seemed possible that PCI might enter into a government coalition with the Christian Democrats as a consequence of Enrico Berlinguer's historic compromise strategy. In August 1974 prosecutor Luciano Violante accused him of plotting a coup attempt, the so called golpe bianco, with Edgardo Sogno, a diplomat and former Resistance fighter. Violante claimed that the plan would have seen Pacciardi lead an emergency program which would have dissolved Parliament, established a single legal trade union, abolished parliamentary immunity, banned left- and far-right parties and set up concentration camps and special tribunals for high-profile politicians. While charges were dropped in 1978, in 2000 Sogno admitted on his deathbed that he and Pacciardi did actually plan a "liberal coup" against "the moderate coalition, the intellectuals, the main economic-financial forces and the left-wing Church". According to Sogno, Pacciardi had personally helped him with the planning and worked on recruiting some contacts within the military and the police, including former Army Chief of Staff Giorgio Liuzzi. With military support they would have persuaded President Giovanni Leone to appoint an emergency cabinet led by Pacciardi as Prime Minister, with the goal of preventing the entry of Communist ministers into the government. In its promoters' view, while PCI and the neo-fascist Italian Social Movement would have been outlawed, the government would have been overall respectful of civil liberties and only held power for a limited time, something that has been questioned by commentators like political philosopher Norberto Bobbio, who had exchanged numerous letters with Sogno in previous years. Other participants in the plot have criticized the truthfulness of Sogno's "confession". Conservative journalist Indro Montanelli dismissed the accusations as libelous, spread by the left against a political opponent, and supporters have suggested that the actions of the former PRI leader were always meant to be within the framework of the Italian Constitution. These events contributed to Pacciardi's marginalization in Italian politics, and created a controversial legacy.

=== Final years ===
In 1979 he asked to be readmitted to the PRI, which happened the following year. In 1981 he founded a new magazine, L'Italia del popolo, of which he was also director. In the final years of his life he was supportive of Prime Minister Bettino Craxi.

Pacciardi died from a stroke on 14 April 1991, in Rome, aged 92. On request from President Francesco Cossiga he was granted a state funeral. He is buried in the municipal cemetery of Grosseto.

== Personal life ==
Pacciardi was married to Luigia Civinini, a piano teacher.

During his life he met and befriended people like Ernest Hemingway and his lover Martha Gellhorn, Michael Curtiz (who asked Pacciardi for advice in the making of Casablanca) and Fabrizio De André, to whose first wedding he was best man due to his friendship with De André's father, Giuseppe.

He was a freemason. He joined the "Ombrone" lodge of Grosseto in August 1919, becoming "Companion" the following year. In 1937 he joined the Parisian lodge "Eugenio Chiesa", as "master" and in 1938 was elevated to 30th degree of the Scottish Rite.

== Electoral history ==
Election	House	Constituency	Party	Votes	Result
1946	Constituent Assembly	Pisa–Livorno–Lucca–Massa Carrara	PRI	12,451	Elected
1948	Chamber of Deputies	Pisa–Livorno–Lucca–Massa Carrara	PRI	12,061	Elected
1953	Chamber of Deputies	Pisa–Livorno–Lucca–Massa Carrara	PRI	9,849	Not elected
1953	Chamber of Deputies	Italy at-large	PRI	– (Note: Elected in a closed list proportional representation system.)	Elected
1958	Chamber of Deputies	Pisa–Livorno–Lucca–Massa Carrara	PRI	6,997	Elected
1963	Chamber of Deputies	Pisa–Livorno–Lucca–Massa Carrara	PRI	4,220	Elected
1968	Chamber of Deputies	Pisa–Livorno–Lucca–Massa Carrara	UDNR	758	Not elected

== Awards ==
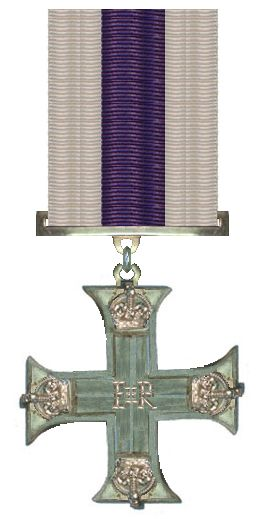
Military Cross
Silver Medal of Military Valor
Silver Medal of Military Valor
Bronze Medal of Military Valor

== Sources ==
- Spinelli, Alessandro (1998). I repubblicani nel secondo dopoguerra (1943–1953) (in Italian). Ravenna, IT: Longo.

Political offices
Preceded by Raffaele Rossetti	Secretary of Italian Republican Party; April 1933 – March 1934	Succeeded by Giuseppe Chiostergi
Preceded by Ottavio Abbati	Secretary of Italian Republican Party (with Cipriano Facchinetti); July 1934 – January 1942	Succeeded by Mario Carrara
Preceded by Giovanni Conti	Secretary of Italian Republican Party; May 1945 – September 1946	Succeeded by Giulio Andrea Belloni
Preceded by Giulio Andrea Belloni	Secretary of Italian Republican Party; January – December 1947	Succeeded by Giulio Andrea Belloni; Ugo La Malfa; Oronzo Reale
