= Giuseppe Codacci Pisanelli =

Italian politician (1913–1988)

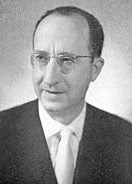

Minister for Parliamentary Relations
- In office 26 July 1960 – 4 December 1963
- Prime Minister: Amintore Fanfani; Giovanni Leone
- Preceded by: Armando Angelini
- Succeeded by: Umberto Delle Fave

Minister of Defence
- In office 16 July 1953 – 16 August 1953
- Prime Minister: Alcide De Gasperi
- Preceded by: Randolfo Pacciardi
- Succeeded by: Paolo Emilio Taviani

Member of the Chamber of Deputies
- In office 8 May 1948 – 4 June 1968
- Constituency: Lecce
- In office 25 May 1972 – 4 July 1976
- Constituency: Lecce

Member of the Constituent Assembly
- In office 25 June 1946 – 31 January 1948
- Constituency: Lecce

Personal details
- Born: 28 March 1913 Rome, Italy
- Died: 3 February 1988 (aged 74) Rome, Italy
- Party: Christian Democracy
- Education: Sapienza University of Rome
- Profession: Politician, University professor

Giuseppe Codacci Pisanelli (28 March 1913 – 3 February 1988) was an Italian Christian Democrat politician.

== Biography ==
Giuseppe Codacci Pisanelli was the son of Alfredo Codacci Pisanelli, a law professor at the University of Rome, a liberal, undersecretary and deputy of the Kingdom, and grandson of Giuseppe Pisanelli, a jurist and Minister of Grace and Justice of the Kingdom of Italy. He graduated in law and in political science and became a free lecturer in Administrative Law in 1940 at the University of Macerata, Captain of the cavalry during the Second World War and in 1943, entered the judiciary, was an auditor at the court of Rome and praetor of Tricase. In 1944 he entered as a volunteer in the Italian Co-belligerent Army and was sent as an observer for Italy at the Nuremberg trial. In 1946 he returned to teaching at the University of Rome and in 1953 at the University of Bari.

He was rector of the Salento University Consortium from 1955 to 1976, and remained director of the Institute of Legal and Economic Sciences.

In 1946 he was elected to the Constituent Assembly for Christian Democracy in the Lecce constituency. He was deputy several times from the I to the IV legislature (1948–1968). He was briefly Minister of defence in the 8th De Gasperi cabinet (1953). In 1954 he became provincial secretary of the DC of Lecce and commissioner of that of Bari. From 1958 to 1960 he was vice-president of the foreign commission of the Chamber of Deputies. Then he served as Minister for relations with the Parliament in the Fanfani III and IV (July 1960 – June 1963) and Leone (June – December 1963) governments.

He was, from 1962 to 1968, mayor of Tricase, in Salento, from which his family came.

Not re-elected to the Chamber of Deputies in 1968, he was again re-elected in the 6th legislature (1972–1976).

In 1979 he was a candidate for the Christian Democracy in the European elections for Southern Italy and was the first of the non-elected.

He died on 3 February 1988 after an intestinal haemorrhage.
