= Eugenio Chiesa =

Italian politician (1863–1930)

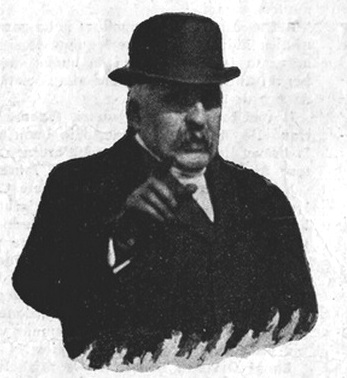
- 1918
- Born: 18 November 1863; Milan, Lombardy, Italy
- Died: 22 June 1930 (aged 66); Giverny (27), France
- Occupations: Accountant/entrepreneur; Political activist Political journalist City Councillor; Deputy (i.e. member of parliament)
- Political party: PRI
- Spouse: Lucia Chiesa Cantú
- Children: 1. Mary Tibaldi Chiesa (1896-1968), author and member of parliament 2. Luciana Gerli Chiesa
- Parent(s): Filippo & Maria Chiesa

Eugenio Chiesa (18 November 1863 – 22 June 1930) was an Italian accountant who found a job with a toy factory. He worked his way up through the ranks and, when the opportunity arose, acquired the business and became very rich. By that time he had also entered politics. As a young man he had been greatly influenced by the writings of Mazzini: he remained a committed Risorgimento-republican throughout his life. His long political career was also marked by several high-profile anti-corruption campaigns. Between 1904 and 1926 he served as a member of the Chamber of Deputies (the lower house of the kingdom's bicameral parliament). After 1922 he emerged as an uncompromising opponent of Fascism. In June 1924 he was among the first members of parliament openly to accuse Mussolini in connection with the (presumed) murder of Matteotti a couple of weeks earlier. Eugenio Chiesa ended his life in exile.

== Biography ==
=== Provenance and early years ===
Eugenio Chiesa was born and grew up in Milan, concluding his education with an accountancy qualification, following which he took a job in the manufacturing sector. Early on joined the Parravicini Toy Making company, though it is unclear whether or not this was his first employer following qualification.

At an early age he displayed his republican convictions by becoming a member of the "Società democratica della gioventù" (loosely, "Young Democrats") and embarking on a parallel career as a journalist, notably in an exceptionally polemical article which he contributed in March 1883 to the only edition that was ever published of "Il Quarantotto" ("The '48") in which he attacked what he termed "government moderation". A month earlier, on 6 February 1883, his name had appeared under another similarly passionate article in "La Nuova Italia", another short-lived political journal dedicated to preserving the political legacy of Giuseppe Mazzini.

=== Republican Party of Italy ===
The period was one in which attempts were underway to firm up a new organisational structure for the republican movement. Chiesa was part of a new generation that created the foundations for a political party which valued the Mazzinian heritage and opposed the dead hand of conservatism and political moderation, while at the same time harnessing and containing the burgeoning of socialism among the "popular classes". In a letter of December 1892 addressed to Napoleone Colajanni, Chiesa writes of "our new Milanese organisation", which will be the theme of a congress to be held in Bologna in 1893 and of an initiative promised for October 1894 by the "Consociazione repubblicana romagnola" (loosely, "Republican Convocation of Romagna"). Thus was born the Italian Republican Party, formally inaugurated at Bologna on 21 April 1895. Chiesa emerged as an early and effective advocate for what has survived to become the most long-lasting of Italy's various political parties.

During the second half of the 1890s the new party took such an intransigent approach to the conservative Rudinì governments that after food riots developed into something more serious in 1898, the Republicans found themselves caught up in the ferocious backlash, along with Socialist and Catholic government opponents. Chiesa fled to Lugano in Switzerland, accompanied by his two-year-old daughter, while his wife, Lucia, stayed at this stage, in Milan to look after the family business. Chiesa remained in Lugano for several months, during which time his supposedly inflammatory contributions to the journal "L'Italia nuova" earned him an "ammonito ufficialmente" ("official warning") - dated 4 August 1898 - from the Swiss parliament. The family were subsequently reunited in Paris.

At around the turn of the century, the political heat had reduced and Chiesa felt able to return with his family to their home in Milan. He now faced trial in respect of an allegedly inflammatory article he had published in the magazine "Ribelle", but with the able advocacy of Giuseppe Marcora, his distinguished defence attorney, he secured an acquittal, which in turn opened the way for a cautious return to engagement in mainstream politics. In October 1899 he was among the promoters of Crepuscolo, a short-lived revival of a weekly political magazine that had ceased publication in 1859. In its new incarnation, the publication was targeted at republicans in the Lombardy region, and a platform in which Chiesa presented a political programme, agreed with other leading figures in the Lombard republican community such as Arcangelo Ghisleri, Luigi De Andreis and Giovanni Battista Pirolini, in anticipation of forthcoming regional elections. Early in 1900 Eugenio Chiesa was duly elected to membership of the Milan city council. At the party congress, held that year in Florence during the first three days in November, he co-produced and presented a report dealing mainly with party organisational issues. He also served, between November 1900 and October 1902, as "political secretary" to the party, returning to undertake the role briefly between May and June 1908, by which time the role of "political secretary" was shared out between more than one man.

In August 1900 Chiesa found himself in disagreement with the party's Milanese leadership and, in particular, with Giovanni Bovio (1837-1903), the respected University Professor of Philosophy and Jurisprudence widely acknowledged as the man who founded the Republican Party of Italy. Both men were committed republicans: disagreement nevertheless arose in the aftermath of the assassination by an anarchist, on 29 July 1900 at Monza, of King Umberto. Chiesa did not share Bovio's principled intransigence over whether senior Republican Party leaders should participate in the late king's funerary honours. Chiesa nevertheless quickly became one of the leading members of the party leadership, appointed to membership the Party Central Committee ahead of the Ancona party congress in November 1901.

During the early years of the twentieth century, Chiesa came out in opposition to a sizable minority of party colleagues pushing for a closer working relationship - possibly even some form of alliance - with the Socialist Party (which despite continuing electoral progress was itself undergoing its own internal disputes about how far to compromise ideology for political pragmatism). Chiesa was robust in his insistence that he could never accept "collectivist solutions" agreed in alliance with the socialists, who would almost certainly, in terms of election results, generally emerge as the numerically weightier member of any partnership. In an electoral college vote held in March 1902, Chiesa gave his support to the anarchist Pietro Calcagno, who was imprisoned on the island of Ventotene at the time, rather than to the high-profile socialist candidate Filippo Turati.

In 1902 the party congress was held at Pisa. Chiesa spoke out on the subject of military budgets, arguing that republicans must oppose military spending because [under the monarchical system operating in Italy] the entire social-political system rested on military power and on the related economic questions, which imposed an essentially conservative and paternalistic interpretation of the relationship between production and labour, between employers and employees, and between social classes. The theme was one which he would continue to elaborate on in the future. He was also contributing to the Milan-based newspaper "Italia del popolo" during this period, providing a series of essays under the heading "Osservazioni" ("Observations"), which were later gathered into a single volume and in 1904 published as "Osservazioni per L'Italia del popolo".

=== Parliament ===
In the General Election of November 1904 Chiesa secured election to the 508 seat Chamber of Deputies. He represented the electoral district of Massa-Carrara, defeating Cherubino Binelli, the traditionalist-liberal candidate put forward what has come to be known as the "Historical Right" quasi-party in a contest dominated locally by the high level of abstentions orchestrated by anarchist activists. (The region's marble quarries were already famous as hotbeds of political anarchism.) He frequently became a regular participant in debates, noted for the lucidity and incisiveness of his contributions. In June 1907 he was prominent among parliamentarians condemning the series of scandals unfolding on the Genoa stock exchange. At almost exactly the same time he reaffirmed Republican Party opposition to military spending in parliamentary debates. In October 1907 he added his name to those of several Socialist and Radical deputies on a telegramme addressed to "Prime Minister" Giolitti in which the signatories condemned the conduct of "Carabinieri" (police) who had shot at striking workers. In July 1908 he again hit the headlines when he teamed up with Claudio Treves to head up negotiations to settle a trade dispute at the Fabriano paper mill. Perhaps of greater significance in retrospect than at the time was Chiesa's application to the government in October 1909, requesting that a protest be lodged with the Austrian government over the expulsion from Trento (at that time part of the Austro-Hungarian empire) of a socialist agitator from Forlì (in Italy) called Benito Mussolini. In June 1911 he delivered a long speech in parliament in which he denounced the monopolistic regime under which the life insurance system was organised in Italy.

It was also in 1909 that he submitted a parliamentary question, which the government chose not to answer, concerning reported links between the young widowed industrial heiress (and alleged spy) Baroness Eleonora Siemens Füssli, and General Fecia di Cossato. His presumptuousness earned him no fewer than five challenges to duels, according to Guelfo Civinini, writing in the Corriere della Sera.

Chiesa was among those deeply opposed to the military intervention identified in Italian sources as The Libyan War of 1911–12. During February 1912, as the unilateral Decree for African Annexation was under discussion, (Note: The Decree for African Annexation subsequently resurfaced, in October 1912, as the "First Treaty of Lausanne", also sometimes identified in English-language sources as the "Treaty (or Peace) of Ouchy".) he spoke out fiercely against the repressive measures undertaken on behalf of the Italian government by the nation's colonial administrators in Libya. He then submitted a parliamentary question on 23 February 1912 asking the government if it had been necessary to conduct an expensive war against the Ottoman Empire in Libya. On the domestic front at this time he was a prominent advocate in parliament for employee rights in the private sector.

In April 1912 Chiesa surprised commentators and created significant controversy with his outspoken expressions of support for the Piombino steel workers who had suffered a significant defeat in an industrial dispute with the powerful "Stabilimento siderurgico di Piombino" ("Piombino Steel Trust").

In February 1913 Chiesa participated prominently in a major street demonstration at Iesi against the government's renewal of the unpopular "Triple alliance" with Germany and Austria, whereby the participants agreed to intervene militarily in support of any alliance member in the event of foreign invasion. The alliance had long been unpopular among Italians especially among republicans, liberals and socialists, since across much of what became the Kingdom of Italy in 1861 folk memories lingered on for generations of Austria's role as a frequently repressive colonial power. Then in June 1913 he questioned the Minister of Justice as to whether any rule existed blocking freemasons from appointment as magistrates, and followed through with more detailed enquiries. Many of the leading republicans in Italy were freemasons at this time, and Chiesa was celebrated - or, among opponents, notorious - for the energy he devoted to supporting the interests of fellow masons. A committed believer in the separation of church and state, he also intervened in parliament to protest about the way in which religious education was being delivered in "certain Milan elementary schools". Later that year, when the Milanese "Camera del lavoro" (loosely, "trades union confederation") called a general strike, Chiesa invited "Prime Minister" Giolitti to intervene personally, as mediator between the bosses and the workers' representatives, and invoking the services of the city prefect. As a true republican, Chiesa had an ingrained sympathy for the emerging trades union movement, which he intellectualized as the "revolutionary syndicalism" of the Sorelian matrix. Always exceptionally active politically, both inside and outside parliament, he battled tirelessly for freedom of thought and expression, and for corresponding modernisation and updates to legislation.

For the 1913 General Election the Republican Party secured an increase in votes, but electoral reforms agreed in 1912 had more than tripled the number of eligible voters, so that the Republicans' proportion of the overall votes, and the number of seats they secured in the Chamber of Deputies (still unchanged in size at 508 seats), were both much reduced. Chiesa took the precaution of putting his name forward for selection by the party and election by the voters in no fewer than six electoral districts, however, and was included in the ballot paper for Milan constituency No. 1, which would have involved representing part of the city in which he lived. He progressed to the run-off second ballot, but was ultimately defeated by Giuseppe De Capitani D'Arzago of the Liberal Party. But the voters of Massa-Carrara remained loyal, and he returned to the Chamber of Deputies representing, as before, Italy's marble capital. During the aftermath of what came to be termed the Massacre of Ancona – in which three young demonstrators were shot dead (Note: There was no agreement over whether the shots came from police weapons or from within the crowd of demonstrators.) – after an "antimilitarism" demonstration got badly out of hand, Chiesa was characteristically robust and uncompromising in his very public criticism. He was one of the parliamentarians who blamed the government directly for what had happened, and he attended the funerals of the three victims. The tragedies in Ancona were part of a nationwide week of protests. After the so-called "Red Week" was over, Eugenio Chiesa worked to try to repair the broken relations between the government and the many political activists of the extreme left.

=== War ===
When the First World War erupted beyond the Alps during the later summer of 1914, it was far from clear whether or not Italy would become militarily involved. The nationalist fervour which powered the British and German interventions was less widespread in Italy, and there was no obvious consensus on whether any military intervention should be undertaken alongside Italy's "Triple alliance" allies - a development favoured by many conservatives - or alongside the French, whose military role in securing Italian unification in 1859 was not forgotten by risorgimento-republicans. France was widely seen as a standard-bearer for political liberalism and progress towards democracy. Germany and Austria were not. Abandoning his long-standing hostility to "expensive wars", Chiesa lined up alongside most of the leading members of the Republican Party in demanding that Italy should intervene in the war on the side of the French and against the "central powers" of Germany and Austria. Beyond the public gaze, he even worked discretely but energetically to create some kind of "Casus belli". The government procrastinated, insisting that discussion over which side to back was at best premature, because Italy was totally unprepared for fighting any war. Meanwhile, Austrian intelligence picked up on Chiesa's activism in attempting to steer the government towards military engagement against the "central powers". His name is included in a memorandum addressed by the Austrian ambassador in Rome to the Italian Foreign Ministry, denouncing those who had set up a secret committee working to involve Italy in the war against Austria, which would risk revolution and damage monarchy. Moreover, and probably more controversially, in a Republican Party meeting held early in August 1914 Chiesa openly declared that if the monarch broke the government's self-imposed neutrality ordinance (in order to enter the war on the Austrian side), it would signal that the time had come for Italy to adopt a republican government. (Note: "... giunta l'ora di instaurare in Italia il governo repubblicano".) On 22 August he presented a parliamentary motion in support of entering the war against Austria. On 2 September he rejected an invitation from the German social democratic politician Albert Südekum to a "behind the scenes" meeting to discuss the possibility of an agreement between the Italian and German governments that might be "honourable" for Italy. Indeed, a few days later he backed an initiative launched by some of the most impatient of the francophile interventionists, which involved launching negotiations with the French government to send a detachment of Italian volunteers to fight in Dalmatia. Chiesa himself travelled to Lyon and then to Bordeaux to promote the idea: it turned out, however, that the French government was not prepared to accept an initiative that clearly did not have the support of the Italian government.

During the ten months between the outbreak of war in the rest of Europe and Italy's own military intervention against Austria, Chiesa's actions were very much in line with the Risorgimento traditions. Those traditions were embodied in the writings and actions of the two great heroes of the nineteenth century unification narrative, Giuseppe Mazzini and Giuseppe Garibaldi. Among his own contemporaries he was also much influenced by his fellow deputy, Salvatore Barzilai from Trieste, who was a long-standing advocate for Italian irredentism.

By the end of 1914, the Italian government was coming under intensive pressure from Berlin, Paris, Vienna and London to enter the war. Behind the scenes, a promises bidding war was in progress. It is impossible to know if Chiesa was aware of all this in any detail, but he evidently believed that the government was making preparations to intervene militarily on the side of the French and British and their Russian allies. During this time Chiesa addressed parliament to signal his backing for "Prime Minister" Salandra's adoption of what was becoming known, possibly with a nod and a wink, as "active neutrality". During the early part of May 1915, directly before Italy entered the war on the side of the Franco-Russian-English entente, Chiesa was to be found taking part in the street demonstrations organised by Milanese left-wing interventionists. Italy's declaration of war took place on 23 May 1915: Chiesa immediately asked to be conscripted into the army and sent to the front line. Over the next three and a half years he took a lead among the deputies in pushing the government to do everything necessary to support the country's military effort. In June 1915 he called on the chamber to suspend an important budget discussion in order that members might be updated about the war.

A year later, returning from a term serving on the frontline, Chiesa shared his opinion that Italy would face catastrophe unless Marshall Cadorna was replaced as Army Chief of Staff. A few months before the disastrous Battle of Caporetto, during October/November 1917, Chiesa was still expressing intense criticism of the conduct of the war. That same year he was appointed a "General Commissioner for Military Supplies". Since he was already a member of parliament), the original proposal had been to make this a ministerial appointment, but this would have required him to swear an oath of loyalty to the king, which was a committed risorgimento republican he was disinclined to do. He therefore turned down any offer of a ministerial appointment. In his new posting he was mandated to organise a consignment of equipment for the army air corps: he ventured to question some of the details. After the war was over he was characteristically inclusive in sharing his conclusions from 1917, which appear in a pamphlet he wrote entitled "L'Aeronautica di guerra nella gestione del Commissariato generale". In November 1917, in the aftermath of Caporetto, Army Chief of Staff Luigi Cadorna was replaced. That same month "the honorable Eugenio Chiesa" was appointed "Commissario Generale per l’Aeronautica", in the context of a broader reconfiguration which marked the start of a distancing of what became the Italian Air Force from under the direct command of the army. Chiesa was now responsible for coordinating and presiding over industrial mobilisation in respect of aircraft production.

=== Post-war challenges ===
In the immediate aftermath of the war, a commission of enquiry was created to look into various controversial aspects of the conduct of the war. In respect of Chiesa's time in charge of aeronautical procurement between November 1917 and December 1918, their report accepted that his work and decisions had been undertaken correctly, both politically and administratively. The period was one of intense activity for Chiesa, both internationally and on the home front.

During the winter of 1918-1919, he was a member of the Italian delegation at the Versailles Peace Conference called to create a lasting postwar settlement. His own area of responsibility included the negotiation of war reparations. Chiesa had been on friendly terms with Georges Clemenceau for many years. The two men were natural soulmates politically, sharing commitments to Republicanism and to Laïcité. The war had dramatically revived Clemenceau's political career. Having become politically disconnected after resigning as prime minister in 1909, he returned to the top job in November 1917, and quickly a dominating presence at the Versailles Peace Conference. In February 1919 he took his fellow delegate Salvatore Barzilai for a lengthy meeting with the French leader at which the two of them were able, in Chiesa's case, to revive an ancient friendship, and in both their cases to invite their French fellow republican radical to back the Italian position as conference negotiations progressed. As the negotiations progressed, a certain mutual understanding between the French and Italian delegations did indeed become apparent, based on shared values and objectives, but also, perhaps, on old friendships Nevertheless, the extravagant secret undertakings from the English that may have been decisive in securing Italian participation in the war in May 1915 were only partially fulfilled at the Peace Conference. In respect of Fiume the nature of the undertakings provided to the Italians in 1915 remained unclear, but the cityfolk were left to believe that the territory would indeed become part of Italy. In September 1919 Chiesa travelled to Fiume to demonstrate his support for Gabriele D'Annunzio's attempt to free the territory for annexation to Italy, in defiance of eventual Peace Conference decisions. He undertook to inform parliament in Rome of the widespread exasperation across Fiume, and later that month was voluble in doing so. It soon became apparent that larger forces were at work, however.

With regard to his parliamentary constituency, Chiesa contributed effectively to the funding, planning and construction of the "Marina di Carrara" port facilities at Massa di Carrara, and to the extensive economic developments in the area that followed on from the port development.

=== Fascism and exile ===
During the years directly following the First World War politics in western Europe, whether on the streets or at government level, continued to be impacted by the toxic nationalist currents that had characterised the first part of the century. Before 1922, however, fascist violence was for the most part restricted to the streets. In the eyes of commentators familiar with subsequent developments, Chiesa was one of a number of established politicians who adopted an attitude of "culpable indulgence" towards fascism. The attitude earned a strong reproach from the young radical intellectual Piero Gobetti (who would die young in 1926 following a severe beating by fascist thugs). There were nevertheless many within the Italian political establishment, Eugenio Chiesa among them, who believed or persuaded themselves that Italian Fascism could be "constitutionalised". After 1922 that was not so easy, however. In parliament Chiesa now voted against the government. In his speeches and writings he became a fierce opponent of fascism. He tried to make common cause with socialist parliamentarians, but as the socialist historian Gaetano Salvemini observes, there were too many contraducations in the way: "...the republicans were few in number, and dominated by old parliamentary twisters like ... Chiesa". In May 1923, as a member of the Electoral Reform Commission, Chiesa voted against the so-called Acerbo Project, a parliamentary device intended to ensure a permanent majority for the Fascist Party in the Chamber of Deputies (parliament). In June 1924, following the killing of Matteotti, Eugenio Chiesa was among the first unreservedly to impute responsibility for the atrocity to the Head of Government.

In 1925 Chiesa published his book "La mano nel sacco", a volume of articles he had already published individually in "La Voce Repubblicana" between September 1924 and March 1925, described by Gobetti as "a courageous well documented book, denouncing those whom he had previously mistaken for innivators". One of the more eye-catching disclosures in the book was Chiesa's report that a senior group of his fellow freemasons, led by Grand master Domizio Torrigiani, had collected three and a half million lire (then equivalent, at the official rate and contemporary values, to approximately 40,000 British Pounds) for Mussolini as a way of supporting the "March on Rome", which took place less than a week after the money was handed over.

In 1926, having established his credentials as an incorrigible antifascist, Eugenio Chiesa was forced into exile. In Italy, his home was ransacked by fascist paramilitaries. That year he was one of several opposition parliamentarians to have his membership of the Chamber of Deputies declared forfeit. His business assets were liquidated.

He escaped through Switzerland, settling briefly, like a number of other Italian political exiles including his fellow former parliamentarian Cipriano Facchinetti, at Annemasse, by the Franco-Swiss border south of Geneva. From there he relocated to Sèvres, on the edge of Paris. His final move was to Giverny, a small riverside municipality in the countryside, known to art lovers as the former home, between 1883 and 1926, of Claude Monet. In France, Chiesa was free to pursue his political interests and sustain a network of contacts with other Italian exiles. He was also more deeply engaged than ever in the politics of Italian free masonry, which had come under intensifying persecution in Italy since 1923, despite the enthusiasm with which many leading Italian Freemasons had initially backed the Mussolini take-over. Money was a problem, since the Italian government had succeeded in stripping him of virtually all his wealth and possessions. He was able to find enough basic accountancy work in and around Giverny to support himself and his daughter, however. (His wife had died suddenly in 1919.)

During the middle 1920s, the Italian Republican Party collapsed as its leaders were either arrested or managed to escape abroad. In 1926 it was formally banned. It was reconstituted after a fashion in 1927 as the Paris-based Concentrazione Antifascista Italiana. Chiesa was called upon to take part in the leadership of the new organisation, but there is little indication of his having been much involved in it, though he had been active in calling for its creation.

Eugenio Chiesa died at Giverny on 22 June 1930. The funeral celebration was held in Paris, attended, according to reports, by all the many Italian antifascist refugees and free masons in the city. His ashes were interred in the Père Lachaise Cemetery. Not quite twenty years later, however, on 30 April 1950, they were transferred to Milan, his home city.

== Freemasonry ==
During the nineteenth century freemasonry had been suppressed in Italy: the story of the events leading up to Italian unification is closely entwined with the story of Freemasonry in Italy as a focus of underground political opposition to the domination of the Italian peninsular by one - or by some criteria two - of Europe's "great powers". Giuseppe Garibaldi himself was an active and enthusiastic mason. Giuseppe Mazzini also engaged with freemasonry, although the extent of his personal involvement is less than clear. Eugenio Chiesa was initiated into the Propaganda Massonica (as "P2" was generally known at the time) lodge of the Grand Orient of Italy at Rome on 30 May 1913. Most of the leaders of the Italian Republican Party were masons during this period, and it is likely that Chiesa participated fully in the movement's activities from the outset, though it is only in respect of his final four years, during the period of his exile in France when, under somewhat unusual and unhappy circumstances, he briefly became "Grand Master" for the exiled Italian order, that his masonic involvement becomes frequently referenced in sources.

During his French exile, during 1929 Chiesa was elected "Grand Master" ("Maestro venerabile") Italia N° 450 of the Grand Lodge of France, at Paris. He was then one of those who on 12 January 1930 went on reconstitute, at the "Taverna Gruber", now in Parisian exile, the Grand Orient of Italy. Chiesa was elected "Grand Master", serving for slightly more than six months till his death on 22 June 1930. According to at least one source, he renounced the actual position, while continuing to fulfill all the appropriate tasks and responsibilities, as "adjunct" to his predecessor Domizio Torrigiani. Torrigiani was still very much alive, despite being in poor health and detained by the Fascists after 1927, initially in a Rome prison and then, under close police supervision, on a succession of appropriately isolated islands. Even during the first half of 1930, Chiesa remained mentally vigorous, increasingly taking an interest in socialist and anarchist ideas.

== Recognition ==
1964 marked the 34th anniversary of Eurgenio Chiesa's birth. It was also the year following the centenary of his birth. On 22 June 1964 the marble workers of Carrara placed a large memorial to his memory in the centre of the Piazzale del Porto in Carrara.
