= Raffaele Rossetti =

Italian engineer and military naval officer

Italian engineer/naval officer Raffaele Rossetti, c. WWI

Raffaele Rossetti (12 July 1881 – 27 December 1951) was an Italian engineer and military naval officer who sank the once main battleship of the Austro-Hungarian Empire at the end of World War I. He was also a politician of the Italian Republican Party.

== Biography ==
Born in Genoa, Raffaele Rossetti graduated as an engineer from the University of Turin in September 1904. He went to study at the Italian Naval Academy of Livorno, where he became a lieutenant for the Italian Navy Engineering Corps.

In December 1906, he graduated in "naval mechanical engineering" at the Politecnico di Milano.

In 1909 he was promoted to captain and in 1911 went to Libya during the Italo-Turkish War with the cruiser Pisa. During the first years of World War I he worked as the Director of the Navy Arsenal in La Spezia and was promoted to major.

While working there, he started creating a new weapon, based on his idea of a torpedo manned by a person, to be linked to enemy vessels underwater and explode under the ship hull. This weapon was called mignatta (it) ("leech") and was the precursor of the maiale of World War II and the actual "human torpedo".

Illustration of the mignatta ("leech") manned submersible used to mine the SMS Viribus Unitis, Nov. 1918

On 1 November 1918, together with Raffaele Paolucci, Rossetti used his mignatta to assault the former Austrian battleship Viribus Unitis, which, unknown to them (the transfer had taken place a few hours before the action, when Luigi Rizzo had already left his base), had already changed hands to the newly established State of Slovenes, Croats and Serbs and been renamed Jugoslavija. After entering Pola harbour undetected, Rossetti and Paolucci placed limpet mines below the hull of the battleship; they were discovered and captured, and informed the crew that the ship was going to sink; however, they did not reveal that they had placed mines on the hull. The explosions were delayed, and the crew started reboarding the ship, believing they were lying. Shortly thereafter, the mines exploded, causing the Jugoslavija to capsize and sink, with heavy loss of life. Rossetti and Paolucci were awarded the Italian Gold Medal of Military Valor. This event is generally known as the Raid on Pula.

In 1919, Raffaele Rossetti retired as a colonel. With the advent of Italian Fascism, he became a member of the Italian Republican Party (PRI). He also founded the Anti-fascist movement Italia libera together with Giovanni Conti, Randolfo Pacciardi and others. In 1925 he was assailed by Fascist squads, and decided to move to France. Here he was part of the directive of Giustizia e Libertà, an anti-fascist movement of Italian activists in Paris. In 1930 he left the movement and, together with Cipriano Facchinetti, founded another anti-fascist movement, La Giovine Italia. In 1932 he was elected secretary of the exiled PRI, but the following year he was replaced by Pacciardi.

During the Spanish Civil War, Rossetti moved to Barcelona and collaborated with local radio stations by running anti-fascist slogans. In retaliation, the Italian government revoked his Gold Medal won during World War I. This measure was annulled after the Fascist government was ousted and Italy became a Republic after the end of World War II.

He died in Milan in 1951.

== See also ==
- SMS Viribus Unitis
- Regia Marina
- Adriatic Campaign of World War I

== Sources ==
- The Fate of the Viribus Unitis by Raffaele Paolucci. in "The Fortnightly Review" (New York), Vol. 105, 1919, 977–988.
- The Sinking of the Viribus Unitis by Raffaele Rossetti. in "Great Moments of Adventure". edited by Evan J. David. Duffield and Co., 1930.

Political offices
Preceded by Cipriano Facchinetti	Secretary of Italian Republican Party; March 1932 – April 1933	Succeeded by Randolfo Pacciardi
