= Luciano Violante =

Italian judge and politician (born 1941)

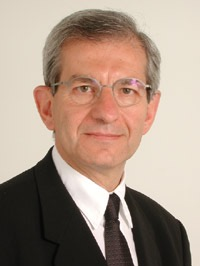

President of the Chamber of Deputies
- In office 10 May 1996 – 29 May 2001
- Preceded by: Irene Pivetti
- Succeeded by: Pier Ferdinando Casini

Member of the Chamber of Deputies
- In office 20 June 1979 – 28 April 2008
- Constituency: Turin (1979–1994; 2001–2006); Collegno (1994–1996); Sicily (1996–2001; 2006–2008)

Personal details
- Born: 25 September 1941 (age 85) Dire Dawa, Italian East Africa
- Party: PCI (before 1991); PDS (1991–1998); DS (1998–2007); PD (since 2007)
- Education: University of Bari
- Profession: Magistrate, university professor

Luciano Violante (born 25 September 1941) is an Italian judge and politician.

== Biography ==
Violante was born in Dire Dawa. His father, a journalist and Communist, was forced to emigrate to Ethiopia by the fascist regime. His family was held by the British in an internment camp, where Violante was born and remained until 1943.

Graduated in jurisprudence at University of Bari in 1963, he joined the magistrature in 1966 and became professor of public law at University of Turin in 1970. Later he held the position of full professor at University of Camerino. He indicted Edgardo Sogno in 1974 for having planned the so-called Golpe bianco ("White coup"), but had to release him in 1978, declaring it impossible to prosecute him. From 1977 to 1979 he worked in the legislative office of the Ministry of Justice, primarily concerned with the struggle against terrorism. He was named investigative magistrate in Turin in 1979. In 1983 he became a professor of legal institutions and penal procedure and resigned from the magistrature.

Violante became a member of the Italian Communist Party (PCI) in 1979 and was immediately elected to the Parliament. From 1980 to 1987 he was the PCI spokesman for legal policy. He then became the vice-president of the PCI parliamentary group. Following the split of the PCI in 1991, he entered the Democratic Party of the Left (PDS). He was a member of the Inquiry into the Aldo Moro case, of the Antimafia Commission, the parliamentary committee for the security services, the commission for the reform of the penal code, the Justice Commission and the Council for the Regulation of the House of Deputies.

Violante was President of the Antimafia Commission from September 1992 until March 1994. Under his leadership, the Commission investigated the relations between the Mafia and politics, the so-called terzo livello (third level) of the Mafia. Important pentiti like Tommaso Buscetta, Antonio Calderone and Gaspare Mutolo gave testimonies about links of the Mafia with Christian Democrat politician Salvo Lima, the so-called "proconsul" of former prime minister Giulio Andreotti in Sicily.

On 16 November 1992 Tommaso Buscetta testified before the Antimafia Commission about the links between Cosa Nostra and Salvo Lima and Giulio Andreotti. He indicated Salvo Lima as the contact of the Mafia in Italian politics. "Salvo Lima was, in fact, the politician to whom Cosa Nostra turned most often to resolve problems for the organisation whose solution lay in Rome," Buscetta testified.

Violante was elected president of the Chamber of Deputies on 10 May 1996 and remained in office until 29 May 2001. Re-elected at the 2001 election, he was named president of the Olive Tree-Democrats of the Left parliamentary group.

Beside books on law and penal procedure, he is the author of two books of interviews about the Mafia: La mafia dell'eroina (1987) and I corleonesi (1993). He has also published: Il piccone e la quercia (1992); Non è la piovra (1995) and a poem, Cantata per i bambini morti di mafia (1995). He has been the editor of Dizionario delle istituzioni e dei diritti del cittadino (1996) and of three reports on the Mafia: Mafie e antimafia - Rapporto 1996; Mafia e società italiana - Rapporto 1997 and I soldi della mafia - Rapporto 1998. He also edited two volumes of the Annali della Storia d'Italia ("Annals of the History of Italy"): La criminalità (1997) and Legge Diritto Giustizia. In 1998 he published L'Italia dopo il 1999. La sfida per la stabilità (1998).

Violante considers himself "a believer" but he does not adhere to the Catholic Church.

== Electoral history ==
Election	House	Constituency	Party	Votes	Result	Notes
1979	Chamber of Deputies	Turin–Novara–Vercelli	PCI	20,516	Elected	
1983	Chamber of Deputies	Turin–Novara–Vercelli	PCI	19,201	Elected	
1987	Chamber of Deputies	Turin–Novara–Vercelli	PCI	18,069	Elected	
1992	Chamber of Deputies	Turin–Novara–Vercelli	PDS	8,256	Elected	
1994	Chamber of Deputies	Collegno	PDS	36,368	Elected	
1996	Chamber of Deputies	Sicily 1	PDS	– (Note: Elected in a closed list proportional representation system.)	Elected	
2001	Chamber of Deputies	Turin 2	DS	35,882	Elected	
2006	Chamber of Deputies	Sicily 2	DS	– (Note: Elected in a closed list proportional representation system.)	Elected	

Political offices
Preceded by Irene Pivetti	President of the Chamber of Deputies; 1996–2001	Succeeded by Pier Ferdinando Casini
