= Cipriano Facchinetti =

Italian politician (1889–1952)

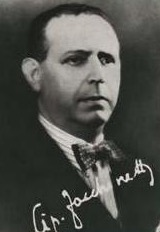

Minister of Defence
- In office 15 December 1947 – 23 May 1948
- Prime Minister: Alcide De Gasperi
- Preceded by: Mario Cingolani
- Succeeded by: Randolfo Pacciardi

Minister of War
- In office 13 July 1946 – 4 February 1947
- Prime Minister: Alcide De Gasperi
- Preceded by: Manlio Brosio
- Succeeded by: Position abolished

Member of the National Council
- In office ?

Member of the Constituent Assembly of Italy
- In office ?

Senator
- In office ?

Member of the Chamber of Deputies
- In office ?

Personal details
- Born: 13 January 1889 Campobasso, Kingdom of Italy
- Died: 18 February 1952 (aged 63) Rome, Italy
- Party: Italian Republican Party
- Occupation: Politician; journalist

Cipriano Facchinetti (13 January 1889 – 18 February 1952) was an Italian politician.

He was a deputy, senator, minister, journalist, president of ANSA and president of Malpensa airport. He dedicated his activity to journalism, holding the position of president of the National Federation of the press and then president of the board of directors of ANSA.

As confirmed by the former President of the Grand Orient of Italy, he was one of the eight father constituents belonging to the main Italian Masonic organization.

== Early life ==
Facchinetti was born in Campobasso on 13 January 1889, to a Calabrian mother and a Bergamasque father.

== Career ==
He began his political activity at a very young age with great republican and Garibaldian ideals. In 1911 when the Malissori of Albania rose up proclaiming national independence, Ricciotti Garibaldi prepared an expedition of red shirts to assist the insurrectional movement. The expedition could not take place, but Facchinetti also went to Trieste, and here, in the editorial office of the newspaper "Emancipazione", invited about fifty trusted companions to be in Podgorica, where then about twenty agreed.

With these friends he left for Albania, thus constituting the Italian group in the guerrilla war in the mountains. When the war broke out in the Balkans, he rushed among the first in the Republican Legion of Ricciotti Garibaldi, fighting in Greece. Voluntarily rushed into the trenches, after eight months of war he was seriously injured in the eyes during an assault on the Ermada, near Monfalcone, deserving the silver medal for valor. He then became head of the Action Committee for the Resistance between the disabled of war, which, after the tragic retreat of Caporetto, contributed effectively to the heroic resistance on the Piave pending the recovery.

After the Armistice of Villa Giusti, he directed the newspaper L'Italia del Popolo in Milan in which he stirred the most important political and social issues of the time. He was alongside Leonida Bissolati, advocating a democratic peace and justice.

In 1924 he was elected deputy from Trieste on the list of the Italian Republican Party (PRI). Tenacious and firm opponent of fascism, he took part in the Aventine secession. In November 1926 he was declared forfeited from the parliamentary mandate and threatened with arrest. Then he went into exile, continuing his political and social activity in France.

During the exile he took part in the constitution of the anti-fascist transversal movement Justice and Freedom. The national secretariat of the Italian Republican Party, of which it was part, had also moved to Paris. On 7 October 1928 he signed with Miguel de Unamuno and Eduardo Ortega y Gasset a pact signed by the Spanish and Italian republican organizations for the defense of common ideals and the creation of a future democratic European federation. From February 1935 to April 1938 he was national secretary of the PRI, until July 1936 collegially with Mario Angeloni and then alone.

At the same time, he held a top role in the field of Freemasonry, having been appointed, in 1931, to the office of First Overseer in the Council of the Order of the Grand Orient of Italy in exile; he was affiliated to the "Eugenio Chiesa lodge" in Paris. He knew the Freemason Arcangelo Ghisleri, a follower of Carlo Cattaneo.

In 1943, being in Marseille, he was arrested by the Germans and taken to Rome to the Regina Coeli prison, until July 25. Released, following the fall of fascism, after 8 September he had to resume his exile route, being wanted by the police, and took refuge in Switzerland. From there he took an active part in the partisan struggle. In 1944, with the liberation of southern and central Italy, he returned to Rome.

In 1946 he was appointed member of the National Council, representing the Republican Party. On 28 June, he was nominated by his party for the election of the provisional Head of the Italian State, placing himself immediately after the newly elected Enrico De Nicola.

In 1946 he was elected deputy in the Constituent Assembly, while in 1948 he was appointed Senator by right. In 1946 he was also appointed Minister of War in the second De Gasperi government, while in 1947 he was appointed Minister of Defence in the fourth De Gasperi government.

== Death ==
He died in Rome on 18 February 1952, at the age of 63.
