= Edgardo Sogno =

Italian diplomat, partisan and political figure

Edgardo Sogno del Vallino di Ponzone OMRI
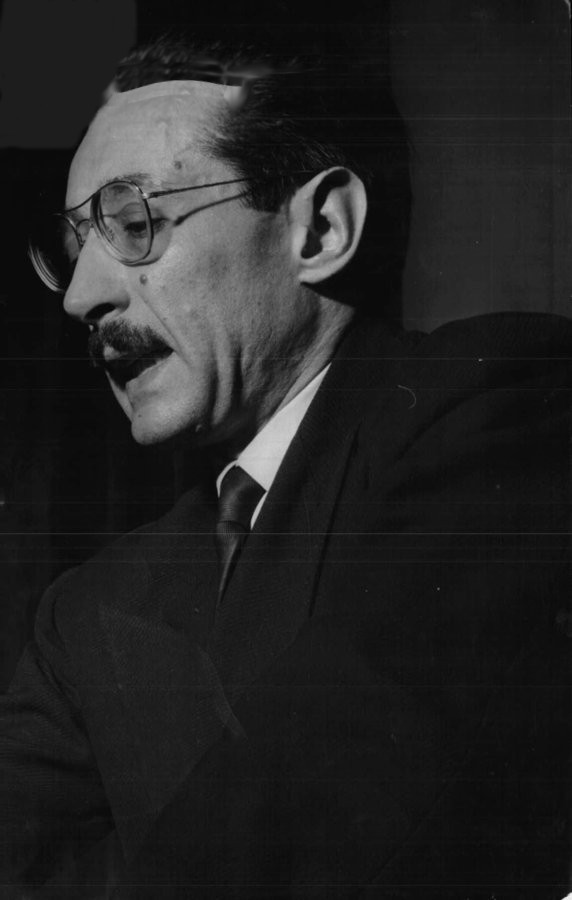

Member of the National Council
- In office 25 September 1945 – 24 June 1946
- Parliamentary group: Italian Liberal Party

Personal details
- Born: 29 December 1915 Camandona, Piedmont, Italy
- Died: 5 August 2000 (aged 84) Turin, Piedmont, Italy
- Party: PLI (1946–1956); Independent (1956–1996); AN (1996–2000)
- Spouse: Anna Arborio Mella
- Children: Sofia, Nanina
- Education: Polytechnic University of Turin; NATO Defense College
- Profession: Diplomat; Military
- Civilian awards: Order of Merit of the Italian Republic (Grand Officer - Grande Ufficiale) (OMRI)

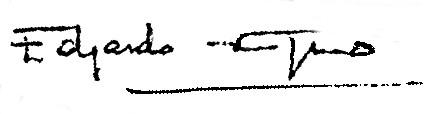
- Signature
- Nickname(s): Franco Franchi, "Eddy"

Military service
- Allegiance: Kingdom of Italy
- Branch/service: Royal Italian Army
- Years of service: 1933–1945
- Rank: Leutnant
- Unit: 3rd Cavalry Division Amedeo Duca d'Aosta
- Battles/wars: Spanish Civil War; Italian Campaign; Italian Civil War
- Military awards: Gold Medal of Military Valour; Bronze Star Medal (USA)

Count Edgardo Pietro Andrea Sogno Rata del Vallino di Ponzone OMRI (29 December 1915 – 5 August 2000) was an Italian diplomat, partisan and political figure. He was born in an aristocratic family from Piedmont. Sogno was a monarchist, antifascist and anticommunist.

== Under Fascism ==
Sogno was born in Piedmont. He joined the Italian Army at 18 and became sublieutenant in the "Nizza Cavalleria" regiment. After graduating in law, in 1938 he volunteered to fight in the Spanish Civil War on the Nationalist side with Italian troops sent by Benito Mussolini. In 1940, he entered the Italian diplomatic service. During this time, he also started frequenting some antifascist circles, which included Benedetto Croce and Giaime Pintor.

In 1942, he was called back into military service and deployed in Vichy France. A year later he was arrested on charges of high treason for having publicly hoped for the victory of the United States. A monarchist, he was then close to the Italian Liberal Party (PLI), and after the armistice of Cassibile became representative of the PLI at the National Liberation Committee, the umbrella organization of the Italian resistance movement. He established the liberal-leaning partisan group "Organizzazione Franchi", he was tortured by Nazis and was awarded the Gold Medal of Military Valor for his wartime acts. During the war he also helped hundreds of Italian Jews and others seek safe haven in Switzerland.

== After the war ==
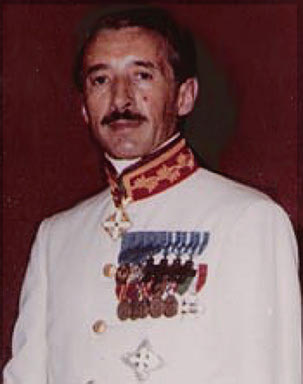
Edgardo Sogno in uniform in the 1970s.

After the Liberation, he founded the Corriere Lombardo newspaper as well as Costume. In September 1945 he was named by the PLI as one of the deputies to the National Council, a provisional legislative body. He contested the June 2, 1946 referendum creating the Republic of Italy, submitting without success numerous appeals before the Corte di Cassazione in the aim of reversing the results of the vote and restoring the monarchy. He joined the diplomatic service, serving in Buenos Aires, where Juan Peron was head of state, then in Paris, London, Washington DC and, last, as ambassador in Rangoon. While posted to Budapest, Hungary, in 1956, he helped people flee the country after the Soviet Union invaded Hungary and crushed the Hungarian Revolution.

He returned to Italy in 1971, where he founded the Comitati di Resistenza Democratica (Committee of Democratic Resistance), an anti-communist organization of the political center. Three years later, he was accused by the communist magistrate Luciano Violante of having planned, along with Luigi Cavallo and Randolfo Pacciardi, the Golpe bianco ("white coup d'etat"), a supposed coup. Following a year and a half of prison, he was freed in 1978, the investigative magistrate declaring that he was unable to proceed in the trial. He was later completely exonerated for attempting to plot a coup.

Liberal, monarchist, then admirer of Charles de Gaulle, Edgardo Sogno returned to politics only in 1996, as a candidate to the Italian Senate, in Cuneo, for the National Alliance (Alleanza Nazionale) party founded by Gianfranco Fini. Failing to be elected, he retired to private life.

In his 1998 memoirs, Sogno revealed how he had visited the CIA station chief in Rome in July 1974 to inform him of his plans for an anti-communist coup. He wrote: "I told him that I was informing him as an ally in the struggle for the freedom of the west and asked him what the attitude of the American government would be," and then: "He answered what I already knew: the United States would have supported any initiative tending to keep the communists out of government."

== Honors ==
- Order of Merit of the Italian Republic (Grand Officer - Grande Ufficiale) (OMRI) – June 2, 1974

== Publications ==
- Guerra senza bandiera. Milan: Rizzoli. 1950.
- La minaccia comunista in Italia. Milan: Pace e libertà. 1953.
- De Gaulle: La spada appesa al filo Bietti (1997) ISBN 978-88-8248-005-9
- Due fronti (1998), memoirs ("Two Fronts", two accounts of the Spanish Civil War, one from the Francist side and Sogno, the other from Nino Isaia who took part to the International Brigades) ISBN 9788882700041
- La grande utopia: I confini delleconomia, della natura, della morale Sugarco (1982) ASIN: B0000ECLR6
- La storia, la politica, la istituzioni. Scritti sull'antifascismo, sulla storiografia contemporanea e sulle riforme costituzionali. Soveria Mannelli: Rubbettino. 1999. ISBN 88-7284-788-5.
- Testamento di un anticomunista. Dalla Resistenza al golpe bianco. Milano: Mondadori. 2000. ISBN 88-04-48824-7.

== See also ==
- History of Italy as a monarchy and in the World Wars
- History of the Italian Republic
- Italian Resistance and Partisans
- Spanish Civil War
