= Arcangelo Ghisleri =

Italian geographer

Arcangelo Ghisleri (5 September 1855 – 19 August 1938) was an Italian geographer, writer, and Socialist politician.

Ghisleri was born in the comune of Persico Dosimo (in today's province of Cremona).

A well known geographer by profession, he created numerous maps of Africa. As a journalist, he was part of a wave of philosophically positivist and politically progressive writers who carried the mantle of Mazzini's republican nationalism in the late 19th century. From 1887 to 1890 he founded and edited the review 'Cuore e Critica' which, together with the journals La rivista repubblicana and L'educazione politica, was important in defining the republican ideology of the times. Politically, Ghisleri was close to the revolutionary movements of his time: in 1895 he was one of the founders of the Italian Republican Party.

His friend and fellow radical and Freemason Filippo Turati took over the journal in 1891 and renamed it Critica Sociale, moving it quickly into a socialist direction. In 1867, Ghisleri founded the Società di Liberi Pensatori (Society of the Free Thinkers) in Cremona, on behalf of the Grand Master Giuseppe Garibaldi, together with Mauro Macchi and Ausonio Franchi. In 1879, he was a co-founder of the Masonic Lodge "Pontida" in Bergamo that he joyned until 1906 when he was initiated to the regular lodge "Carlo Cattaneo" in Milan.

Ghisleri was not a systematic ideologist: a systematic version of his republican ideology is best exemplified in the work of Giovanni Conti.

Ghisleri died in Bergamo in 1938.
