= Raid on Pula =

Part of the Mediterrainian Campaign of World War I

Coordinates: 44.8767°N 13.8075°E

- Part of the Mediterranean campaign of World War I
- Viribus Unitis sinking, 1 November 1918
Date	31 October – 1 November 1918
Location	Pula, State of Slovenes, Croats and Serbs
Result	Italian victory

Belligerents
Italy	State of Slovenes, Croats and Serbs

Commanders and leaders
Costanzo Ciano	Janko Vuković †

Casualties and losses
2 captured	300–400 killed Viribus Unitis sunk Wien sunk

The raid on Pula was an Italian Navy operation conducted during the night of 31 October – 1 November 1918, at the end of World War I. It was carried out by frogmen Lieutenant Colonel Raffaele Rossetti and Raffaele Paolucci, who used the Mignatta human torpedo to sink the former flagship of the Austro-Hungarian Navy, the SMS Viribus Unitis. She was anchored, with several other vessels, in the Adriatic port of Pula–the main naval base of Austria-Hungary. The raid succeeded in sinking the flagship and the abandoned passenger ship Wien, which had been used as a floating barracks until a few days before the raid. An estimated 300–400 crew members were killed when Viribus Unitis sank.

The raid took place during the dissolution of Austria-Hungary and the collapse of its armed forces at the Italian Front, which led the Austro-Hungarian command to request and negotiate the Armistice of Villa Giusti days later. In those circumstances, the Italian government ordered its armed forces to continue to advance as far as possible to occupy the territory that the Allies of World War I promised to Italy under the 1915 Treaty of London in order to entice Italy to join the war. Much of the territory was claimed by the National Council of Slovenes, Croats and Serbs established in Zagreb and claiming to represent the South Slavs living in Austria-Hungary. The National Council sought to unite predominantly South Slavic former Habsburg territories with the independent Kingdom of Serbia in a common South Slavic state by uniting and the independent.

The fleet anchored at Pula, as well as other Austro-Hungarian bases, was handed over to representatives of the National Council the day before the raid. Captain Janko Vuković, an Austro-Hungarian Navy officer, was appointed the commanding officer of the newly acquired fleet and promoted to rear admiral. The National Council declared neutrality in the war and informed the Allies of the new development. And many non-South Slavic crew members left the ships believing the war to be effectively over. Discipline among those who remained aboard was relaxed to the point that the ship was illuminated, and a self-governing sailors' council was established that declared a separate commanding officer for the Viribus Unitis, limiting Vuković's authority.

Rossetti and Paolucci were discovered after placing two explosive devices and captured before the explosion that sank Viribus Unitis. They were briefly interrogated aboard the flagship, released, and then recaptured. They were released on 3 November, when Italian forces arrived in Pula, and later awarded the Gold Medal of Military Valor for the successful execution of the raid.

== Background ==
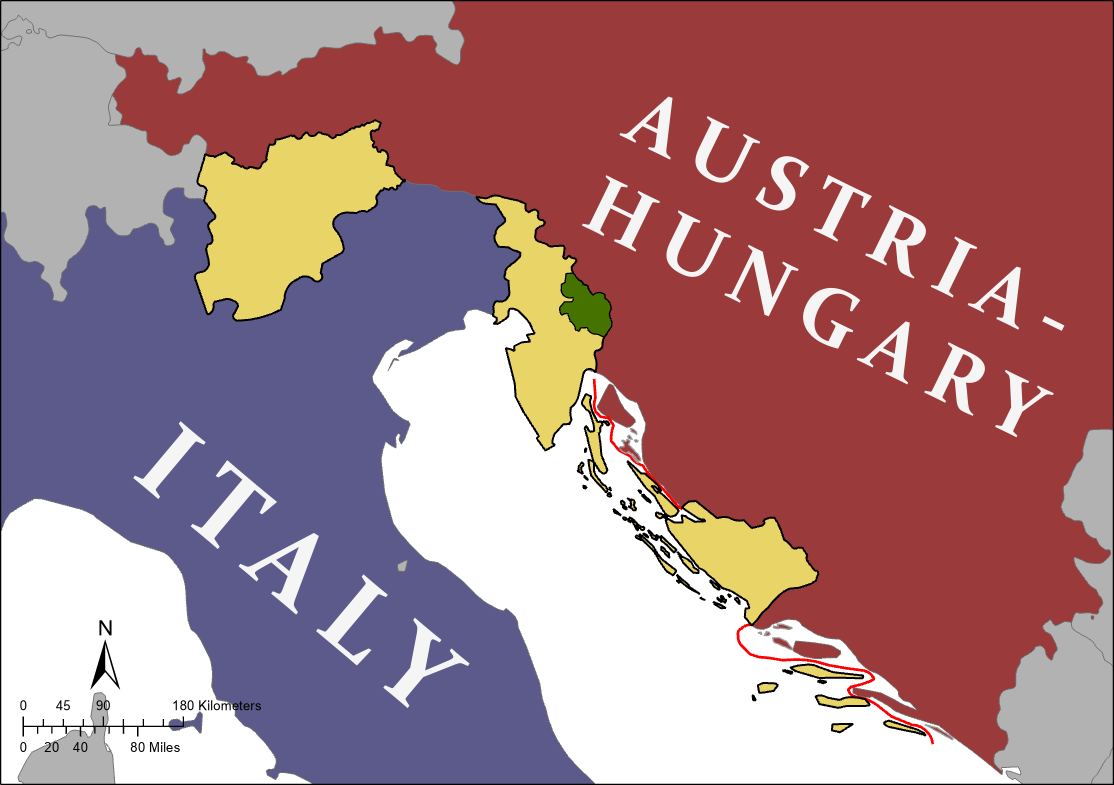
Territories promised to Italy by the Entente in the South Tyrol, the Austrian Littoral, and Dalmatia (tan), and the Snežnik Plateau area (green).

Over the course of World War I, prewar ideas regarding the political consolidation of South Slav-inhabited parts of Austria-Hungary developed further under the influence of wartime events. Initially, these ideas involved proposals to revise the Compromise of 1867 and introduce trialism in Austria-Hungary — reorganising the country from an empire divided into Austrian- and Hungarian-governed halves into one also comprising a South Slavic-administered area. Those efforts culminated in the unsuccessful 1917 May Declaration championed by Anton Korošec, the leading Slovene (and South Slavic) member of the Imperial Council.

In 1915, the Triple Entente sought to entice the Kingdom of Italy to join the war as an Allied power by offering it various territories, including parts of the Austro-Hungarian eastern Adriatic Sea coast, such as northern Dalmatia and Julian March (including Trieste and Istria), under the Treaty of London. Simultaneously, the Entente offered Serbia Bačka, Bosnia, Herzegovina, parts of Dalmatia, Syrmia, and Slavonia as compensation for territories expected to be offered to Bulgaria to secure its alliance.

A group of politicians, led by Frano Supilo and Ante Trumbić, established the Yugoslav Committee to promote the self-determination of South Slav-inhabited lands from Austria-Hungary. After Serbia failed to persuade the Entente to apply the principle of self-determination to the South Slav lands, the Yugoslav Committee endorsed a political union of the South Slav territories of Austria-Hungary with Serbia and the creation of Yugoslavia, seeing unification as necessary to prevent the partitioning of Croatia between Italy, Serbia, and Hungary. In 1917, representatives of the Yugoslav Committee and the Serbian government issued the Corfu Declaration stating their intent to achieve the union.

In the final days of the war, as the dissolution of Austria-Hungary was unfolding, the National Council of Slovenes, Croats and Serbs, chaired by Korošec, was established as the governing body of South Slavs living in Austria-Hungary. On 29 October 1918, the National Council declared the independence of the State of Slovenes, Croats and Serbs, claiming to represent South Slavs living in Croatia-Slavonia and the city of Rijeka, Dalmatia, Bosnia and Herzegovina, Austrian Littoral (Istria, Trieste, and Gorizia), Carniola, Styria, Carinthia, Bačka, Banat, Baranya, and Međimurje. In a note sent to the governments of the United States, United Kingdom, France, Italy, and Serbia, the Council announced the independence of the newly established state and declared that it was not at war with the Allies.

== Prelude ==
=== Handover of the fleet ===
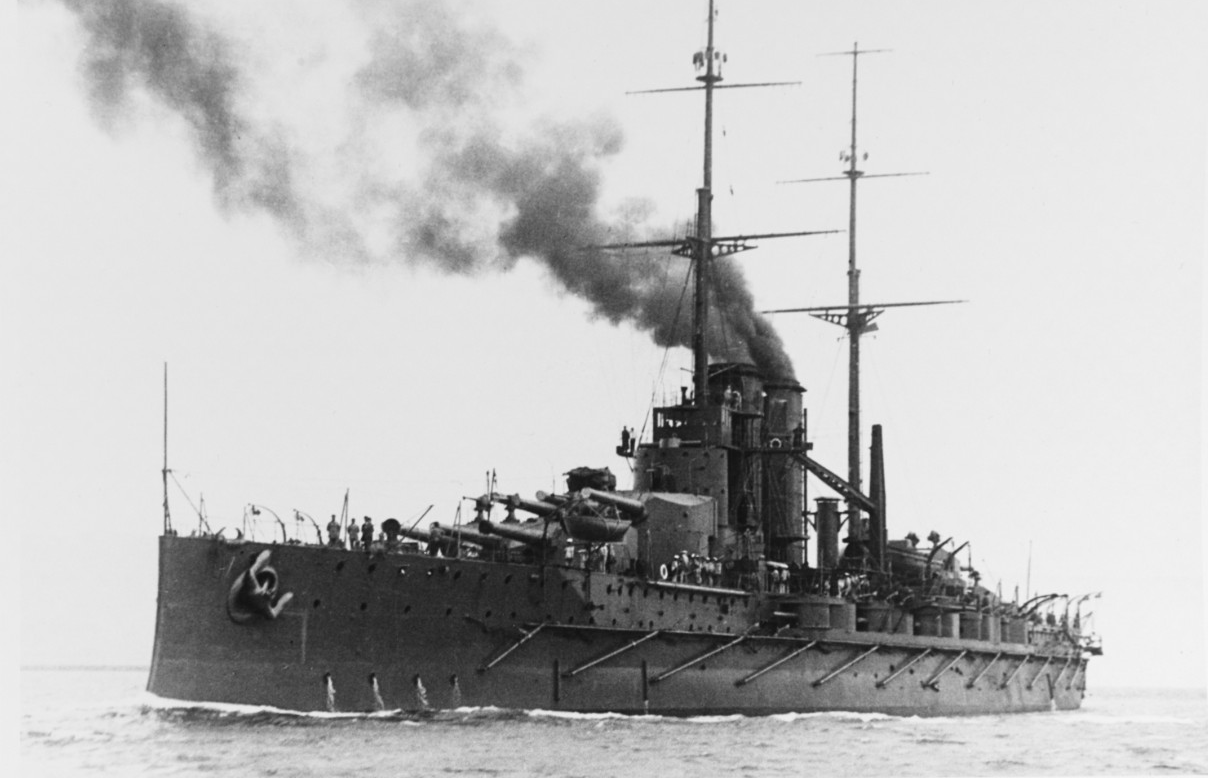
The SMS Viribus Unitis was the target of the 1918 raid on Pula.

On 30 October, Emperor Charles I of Austria ordered the surrender of the Austro-Hungarian Navy, consisting of around 300 vessels, to the National Council. On 31 October, council representatives arrived at the Austro-Hungarian naval bases in Šibenik and Kotor in Dalmatia, and at Pula (Italian: Pola) in Istria, the main naval facility of the monarchy. Formally, the transfer of the fleet took place in Pula, where Admiral Miklós Horthy met with the National Council delegation led by Ante Tresić Pavičić aboard the flagship SMS Viribus Unitis and handed the fleet over to them at 9:00 a.m.; at 4:45 p.m., as Horthy left the ship, the Austro-Hungarian flag was replaced by the Croatian tricolour. The navy was formally placed under Admiral Dragutin Prica, whose post remained in Zagreb. Command of the naval base in Pula was assumed by Fregattenkapitän Metod Koch, and command of the fleet was passed to Ship-of-the-Line Captain Janko Vuković; Koch and Vuković were promoted to rear admiral for the occasion. The National Council also sent a message to notify the Allies of the takeover.

Shortly before the handover, the Imperial German Navy forces stationed in Pula withdrew. They vacated the steamship Wien, which they had used as floating barracks, and scuttled three submarines while a fourth sailed to Kiel; their departure was prompted by Austria-Hungary's request for armistice terms from the Allies. (Note: Historian Zvonimir Freivogel identified the scuttled submarines as SM UB-129, SM U-73, and SM U-34, and the SM U-63 as the one that had left the port to Germany.)

=== News of the handover ===
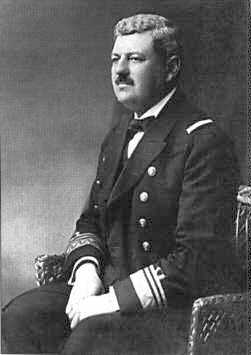
Rear Admiral Janko Vuković was appointed the commanding officer of the fleet of the State of Slovenes, Croats and Serbs.

It is uncertain at what point the Italian Navy learned of the transfer of the Austro-Hungarian fleet. According to Achille Rastelli, it became aware of the transfer only after the raid because of delays in transmitting the National Council's message to the Allies; in any case, the message was likely to be dismissed as a hoax, or the transfer would likely be dismissed as unlawful. Fragmentary reports of unusual events in the Austro-Hungarian navy reached Italy on 31 October, but only after 2 p.m. According to Rastelli, Italy learned of the transfer by 1 November, but chose to ignore the information.

A contemporary German report indicates that envoys discussing the armistice terms did not mention the transfer until 4 November. According to the Austro-Hungarian navy representative at the negotiations, Fregattenkapitän Prince Johannes of Liechtenstein, the Supreme Command in Vienna, feared that the negotiations would be jeopardised because the draft terms demanded the surrender of a navy that had already been handed over to the State of Slovenes, Croats and Serbs. Regardless of instructions to the negotiators, the transfer was telegraphed on 1 November by the Chief of Staff of the 10th Army, General Georg Domaschnian, and reported in the Italian press the next day. Even before the fleet transfer, the British had intercepted a message from Vienna to the Austro-Hungarian naval attaché in the Ottoman Empire informing the diplomat of the scheduled transfer, but it was disregarded on the assumption that Italy had a historic right to capture the Austro-Hungarian navy.

== Forces involved ==
Although Vuković assumed command of the fleet in Pula, his authority aboard Viribus Unitis was limited. Sailors had mutinied on 28 October and formed councils to govern the port and major ships. The council aboard Viribus Unitis declared the ship's physician, Rihard Jug, as the new captain. Convinced the war was effectively over, many non–South Slav crew members left the ship. As crew discipline deteriorated, watertight compartment doors were left open, and several ships in the port—including all three Tegetthoff-class battleships Viribus Unitis, Tegetthoff, and Prinz Eugen—remained fully illuminated.

The Italian raiding force set out from Venice. The attacking component consisted of Regia Marina frogmen Lieutenant Colonel Raffaele Rossetti and Raffaele Paolucci, equipped with the Mignatta human torpedo designed by Rossetti. The vehicle used in the raid, numbered S.2, was a converted 450-millimetre (18-inch) Schneider A/115 torpedo carrying two 175-kilogram (386-pound) limpet mines equipped with time fuzes. Torpedo boats 64 PN and 65 PN provided support, while armed motorboats MAS 94 and MAS 95 towed the human torpedo. The entire force was commanded by Captain Costanzo Ciano aboard one of the support craft.

== Timeline ==
=== Entry into the harbour ===
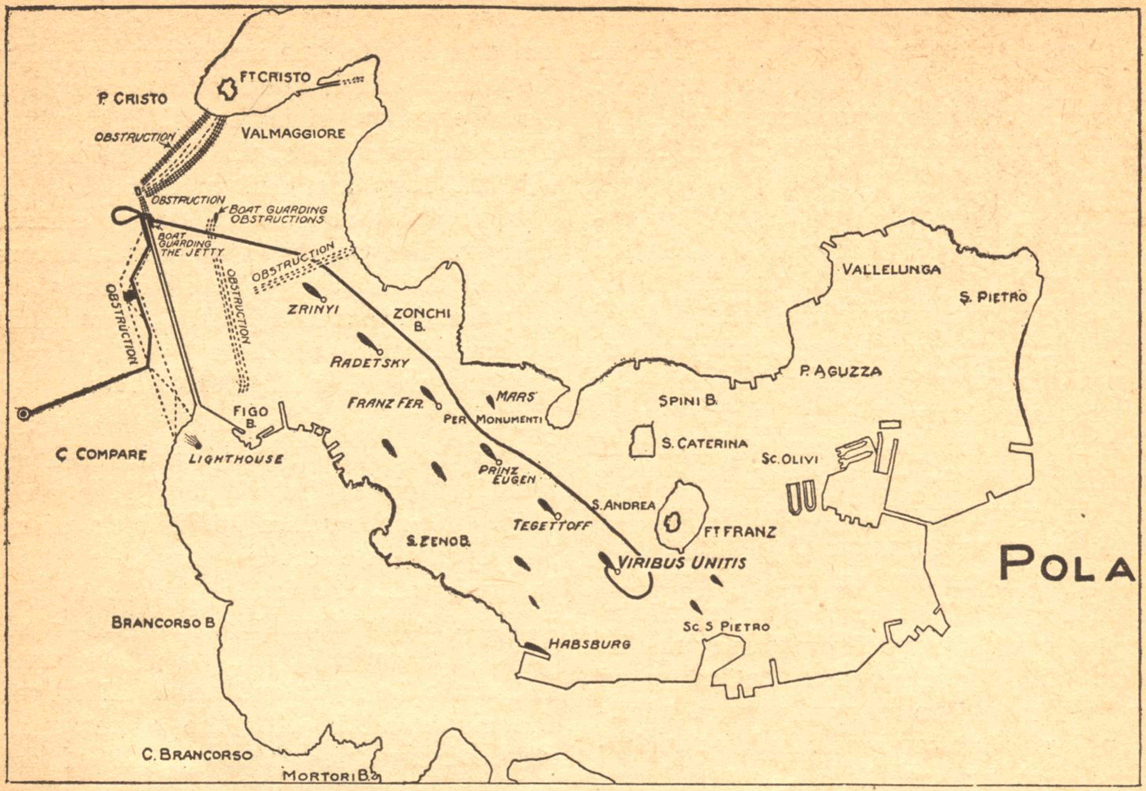
Sketch map of the route taken by Rossetti and Paolucci in the port of Pula and locations of major vessels

The raiding force left at 2 p.m. on 31 October. The human torpedo was carried on the deck of 65 PN to the area near the Brijuni Islands and then towed to the port by MAS 95. At 10 p.m., Rossetti and Paolucci detached the towing cable and proceeded towards the port, reaching its protective barrier half an hour later. By 3 a.m. on 1 November, they had successfully passed through security barriers. The crew of Viribus Unitis likely heard the frogmen moving through water and talking to each other as they entered the port, and briefly used a searchlight to investigate, but a sailors' council representative objected to the unauthorised use of the searchlight and the search was abandoned. Noticing that they may not have sufficient power or time to exit the port before sunrise, Rossetti and Paolucci decided to attack Viribus Unitis and then go ashore. The ship was designated as the primary target, and they knew that it was at the end of a row of anchored vessels. Rosetti and Paolucci planned to wear the Italian officer uniforms that they had on under their wetsuits and proceed on foot to Funtana near Rovinj, where a motorboat was scheduled to pick them up on the nights of 2–7 November.

According to Rossetti, he reached the starboard side of Viribus Unitis at approximately 5 a.m., attached a mine to her hull between the fourth and fifth 150-millimetre (5.9-inch) guns—near what he believed to be close to the engine room—and set the mine timer for 6:30 a.m. As they started to move away, they were spotted, and a motorboat was dispatched to pick them up; while the boat approached, Paolucci activated the second mine. Left attached to the torpedo and set adrift, the charge was carried by the current to Wien, moored about 500 metres (1,600 feet) in Vergarola. (Note: Vergarola is a southern sector of the port of Pula, adjacent to the Sveti Petar (Italian: San Pietro) peninsula.) The charge exploded under the stern, sinking the ship and destroying the human torpedo.

=== Sinking of the flagship ===
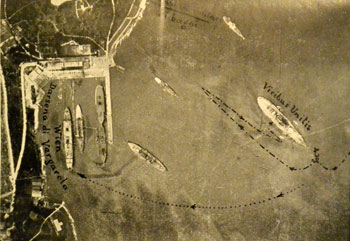
Aerial reconnaissance photograph of the port of Pula showing positions of the SMS Viribus Unitis and Wien, October 1918

The captured frogmen were brought aboard Viribus Unitis for interrogation at 5:45 a.m., where they were surprised to see "Yugoslav" insignia on sailors' caps and unexpectedly cordial crew members. Following Ciano's instructions, they initially claimed to have arrived by seaplane that had subsequently sunk. They then informed Vuković that a mine was attached to the ship's hull and would explode shortly. Intending to handle the expected damage, Vuković kept part of the crew aboard while ordering some sailors to abandon the ship. Rossetti and Paolucci asked Vuković to leave and were permitted to do so. As they swam away from the ship, they passed by swimming sailors and rowboats carrying evacuees from Viribus Unitis. Rossetti later claimed that a rowboat from nearby Tegethoff was dispatched to rescue them, though other sources indicate that the frogmen were confronted and brought back by the sailors.

At 6:20 a.m., the frogmen were picked up and returned to Viribus Unitis, where an angry crowd awaited them. At 6:45 a.m., the mine attached to the flagship exploded, shortly after the explosion that sank Wien. (Note: Freivogel reports the two explosions happened approximately half an hour apart. He also noted the time of the first explosion at 6:20 a.m. but associated it with the device fixed to the Viribus Unitis and the second explosion with the sinking of the Wien.) Viribus Unitis quickly filled with water, rolled over, and sank within 14 minutes. Reported losses ranged from 300 to 400 crew members, including Vuković. Shortly after the explosion, Vuković again allowed Rossetti and Paolucci to leave the ship, and they were taken ashore by rowboat and arrested on landing.

== Aftermath ==
=== Armistice ===
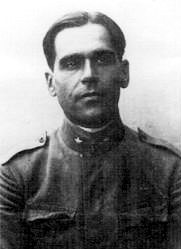
Lieutenant Colonel Raffaele Rossetti designed and operated the human torpedo used in the raid.

The position of Austro-Hungarian forces at the Italian Front rapidly deteriorated. Faced with the threat of military collapse and civil unrest (Note: Such as caused by the Green Cadres) throughout the empire, the emperor accepted the armistice terms and instructed his chief negotiator, General der Infanterie Viktor Weber Edler von Webenau, accordingly. Chief of the Austro-Hungarian General Staff Generaloberst Arthur Arz von Straußenburg ordered all units to cease hostilities at 2 a.m. on 3 November. The Armistice of Villa Giusti was signed at 3:20 p.m. on 3 November, but the Italian negotiator, Major General Pietro Badoglio, informed his counterpart that Italian forces would need time to relay the orders to the front and would not cease fire until 3 p.m. on 4 November. The armistice lines of control largely corresponded to the ones envisaged in the Treaty of London, requiring Austro-Hungarian troops to evacuate Pula—already under the National Council's authority—and the rest of Istria to Italy.

On 3 November, the day the armistice was signed, Italian forces took control of much of the Istrian peninsula, including the cities of Trieste and Pula. On 4 November, Admiral Umberto Cagni arrived in Pula aboard the battleship Ammiraglio di Saint Bon with a company of naval infantry. Cagni came into conflict with Koch, who had remained in Pula, at the start of the Allied occupation of the eastern Adriatic, but ultimately secured Italian control of the port and peninsula. While the arrival of Italian troops and Cagni's command would have been sufficient to assert control of the area, the navy deemed Rossetti and Paolucci's raid necessary to claim a naval victory as well.

=== Fate of the frogmen ===
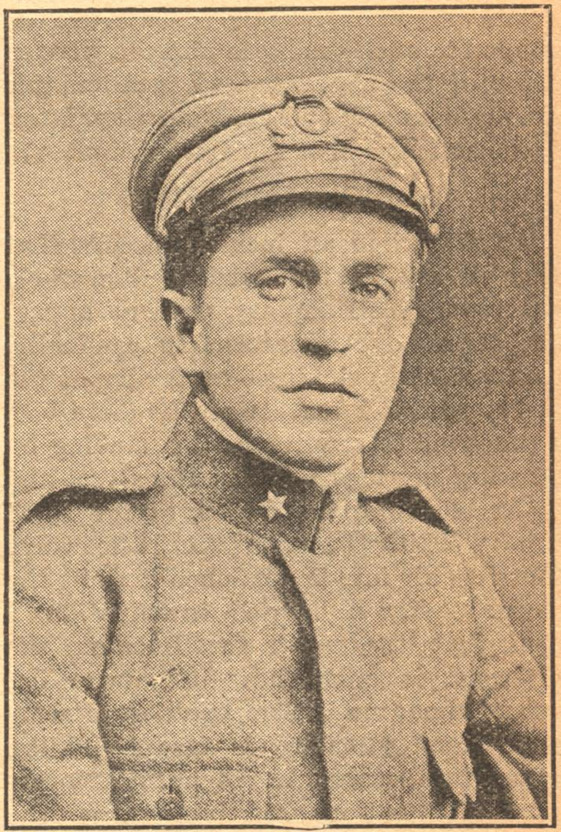
Raffaele Paolucci activated the explosive device that sank Wien

Rossetti and Paolucci were released from captivity upon the arrival of Italian troops in Pula, and both were awarded the Gold Medal of Military Valor. Rossetti, Paolucci, and Ciano were to split the 1.3 million lira bounty offered in April 1918 by Prince Tommaso, Duke of Genoa, for the sinking of Viribus Unitis; Ciano was included because the navy credited him with developing the human torpedo, even though he credited Rossetti for the engineering work. After a dispute between Rossetti and the navy, the bounty was redistributed to him and Paolucci alone. The two donated the money to Vuković's widow to support their son's education.

=== Impact on the National Council ===
On 3 November, while the Italian army was still advancing, the National Council convened in Zagreb. It decided to repeat its 31 October message to the Allied Powers announcing its takeover of the Austro-Hungarian fleet, requested the Allies to respect the right of the South Slavs to self-determination, and asked United States president Woodrow Wilson for protection. The council also urged Allies not to prejudge the postwar political settlement based on the Italian occupation of the territories claimed by the National Council for the South Slavic state. The Council felt that its limited forces were insufficient to defend the new South Slavic state and called for mobilisation. Unable to quell civil unrest or fend off the Italian advance, the National Council made contact with Vojvoda Stepa Stepanović of the Royal Serbian Army, asking for the deployment of Serbian troops.

=== Salvage operations ===
The wreck of Viribus Unitis lay at a depth of 30 metres (98 feet). Although it was deemed salvageable by an inspection in late 1919, the wreck was broken up and scrapped because the armistice terms did not allow its addition to the Italian navy. Most of the wreck was removed from the port. Approximately 95% of the wreck, broken up using explosives, was recovered by Italian salvage operations over the next two decades. The Kriegsmarine raised five 305-millimetre (12.0-inch) cannons in 1944, and Croatian archaeologists continued to recover ship equipment from the site a century after the sinking. A section of the bow is displayed at the Venetian Arsenal. One anchor stands at the entrance to the Palazzo della Marina in Rome, and the other at Venice's Museo Storico Navale.

== Sources ==
- "Museo Storico Navale di Venezia". Venice: Museo Storico Navale di Venezia. Archived from the original on 11 February 2025.
- "Palazzo della Marina". Rome: Italian Ministry of Defence. Archived from the original on 2 June 2023.
- Bagnasco, Erminio (2023). Italian Assault Craft, 1940-1945. Barnsley: Pen and Sword Books. ISBN 9781399056113.
- Banac, Ivo (1984). The National Question in Yugoslavia: Origins, History, Politics. Ithaca: Cornell University Press. ISBN 0-8014-1675-2.
- Beneš, Jakub S. (2025). The Last Peasant War: Violence and Revolution in Twentieth-Century Eastern Europe. Princeton: Princeton University Press. ISBN 9780691267586.
- Cipriani, Carlo Cetteo (2016). "Itaalia sõjaline okupatsioon Dalmaatsias 1918–1921" [Italian military occupation in Dalmatia in 1918–1921: the fate of a former part of the Austro-Hungarian Empire]. Eesti sõjaajaloo aastaraamat (in Estonian). 6 (12). Tallinn: Tallinn University Publishing House: 85–116. ISSN 2228-0669.
- Farley, Robert M. (2015). The Battleship Book. Rockville: Wildside Press. ISBN 9781479405572.
- Freivogel, Zvonimir (2014a). "Crtice iz Prvog svjetskog rata u Puli i na Jadranu" [Stories from the World War I in Pula and in the Adriatic] (PDF). In Dobrić, Bruno (ed.). Carska i kraljevska mornarica u Puli i na Jadranu: od 1856. do 1918. godine [Imperial and Royal Navy in Pula and in the adriatic: From 1856 to 1918] (PDF) (in Croatian). Pula: Društvo za proučavanja prošlosti Carske i kraljevske Mornarice (k.u.k. Marine) Viribus unitis. pp. 188–207. ISBN 9789535622116.
- Freivogel, Zvonimir (2014b). "Potapanje bojnog broda Viribus Unitis u pulskoj luci 1. studenog 1918." [Sinking of the Battleship Viribus Unitis in the Port of Pula on 1 November 1918] (PDF). In Dobrić, Bruno (ed.). Carska i kraljevska mornarica u Puli i na Jadranu: od 1856. do 1918. godine [Imperial and Royal Navy in Pula and in the adriatic: From 1856 to 1918] (PDF) (in Croatian). Pula: Društvo za proučavanja prošlosti Carske i kraljevske Mornarice (k.u.k. Marine) Viribus unitis. pp. 208–219. ISBN 9789535622116.
- Koprivica-Oštrić, Stanislava (1983). "Vojnička pobuna u Varaždinu 23. VII 1919. godine" [Military Rebellion in Varaždin, July 23, 1919]. Povijesni prilozi (in Croatian). 2 (2). Zagreb: Croatian Institute of History: 65–94. ISSN 0351-9767.
- Lowe, C. J. (1969). "Britain and Italian Intervention, 1914–1915". The Historical Journal. XII (3). Cambridge: Cambridge University Press: 533–548. doi:10.1017/S0018246X00007275. ISSN 0018-246X. JSTOR 2638003. S2CID 162738142.
- Marinić, Mario (18 August 2023). "Prije 77 godina dogodila se tragedija na kupalištu Vergarola" [77 Years Ago Tragedy Occurred at the Vergarola Beach]. Nacional (in Croatian). Zagreb: Nacional News Corporation. ISSN 1330-9048. Archived from the original on 21 August 2024.
- Matijević, Zlatko (2008). "The National Council of Slovenes, Croats and Serbs in Zagreb (1918/1919)". Review of Croatian History. 4 (1). Zagreb: Hrvatski institut za povijest: 51–84. ISSN 1845-4380.
- Merlicco, Giordano (2021). "Between old Austria and new foes: Italy and the Yugoslav project (1917-1918)" (PDF). Istorijski Zapisi. XCIV (1–2). Podgorica: Istorijski institut Crne Gore: 115–138. ISSN 0021-2652. Archived (PDF) from the original on 1 June 2023.
- Pavlović, Vojislav G. (2019). "Italy and the Creation of Yugoslavia. Delenda Austria?". In Pavlović, Vojislav G. (ed.). Serbia and Italy in the Great War. Belgrade: Institute for Balkan Studies. pp. 245–278. ISBN 978-86-7179-103-8.
- Ramet, Sabrina P. (2006). The Three Yugoslavias: State-Building and Legitimation, 1918–2005. Bloomington: Indiana University Press. ISBN 978-0-253-34656-8.
- Rastelli, Achille (2007). "L'affondamento della SMS Viribus Unitis: Un fatto militare o politico" [Sinking of the SMS Viribus Unitis: A Military or Political Act]. Quaderni (in Italian). 18 (1). Rovinj: Centar za povijesna istraživanja: 343–377. ISSN 0350-6746.
- Robbins, Keith (1971). "British Diplomacy and Bulgaria 1914–1915". The Slavonic and East European Review. 49 (117). London: Modern Humanities Research Association: 560–585. ISSN 0037-6795. JSTOR 4206453.
- Rossetti, Raffaele (1919). "The Sinking of the Viribus Unitis: Official Report of the Destruction of the Austrian Dreadnought by Two Italian Officers". Current History. 9 (3). Berkeley: University of California Press: 493–499. ISSN 0011-3530.
- Trifunovska, Snežana, ed. (2023). "No. 58: Regulations of the National Council of Slovenes, Croats and Serbs; Zagreb, 8 October 1918". Yugoslavia Through Documents: From Its Creation to Its Dissolution. Leiden: Brill Publishers. p. 145. ISBN 9789004638952.
- Trogrlić, Marko; Stepanić, Željko (2007). "Pula kao austro-ugarska ratna luka" [Pula as an Austro-Hungarian War Port]. Školski vjesnik: časopis za pedagogijsku teoriju i praksu (in Croatian). 56 (1–2). Split: University of Split: 17–23. ISSN 0037-654X.
- Tunstall, Graydon A. (2021). The Austro-Hungarian Army and the First World War. Cambridge: Cambridge University Press. ISBN 9780521199346.
- Zrinić Terlević, Sandra (15 December 2014). "Nova otkrića stoljeće nakon potonuća Viribus Unitisa" [New Discoveries a Century After Sinking of the Viribus Unitis]. Glas Istre (in Croatian). Pula: Glas Istre novine. ISSN 0017-0771. Archived from the original on 11 January 2026.
- Živojinović, Dragoljub (2019). "Serbia and the 1915 Treaty of London". In Pavlović, Vojislav G. (ed.). Serbia and Italy in the Great War. Belgrade: Institute for Balkan Studies. pp. 121–136. ISBN 978-86-7179-103-8.
