= Ausonio Franchi =

Italian philosopher

- Born: 11 March 1821; Florence, Grand Duchy of Tuscany
- Died: 2 March 1895 (aged 73); Florence, Kingdom of Italy
- Occupation: Philosopher

Ausonio Franchi (real name Cristoforo Bonavino) (24 February 1821, in Pegli, province of Genoa – 12 September 1895, in Genoa) was an Italian philosopher and editor.

== Life ==
He entered the ecclesiastical state, and some time after his ordination to the Catholic priesthood, was appointed director of an institution for secondary education at Genoa. Soon, however, he became imbued with the doctrines of French positivism and German criticism. Doubts arose in his mind, followed by an internal struggle which he describes in his work on the philosophy of the Italian schools.

At the same time, important political events were taking place in Italy, culminating in the revolution of 1848. Franchi abandoned the priest's habit and office in 1849 and assumed the name of Ausonio Franchi (i.e. free Italian), indicating thereby his break with his own past and his new aspirations. Henceforth, all his talents were devoted to the cause of intellectual and political liberty. The dogmatic authority of the Church and the despotic authority of the State are the objects of his incessant attacks. Combining Kant's phenomenalism and Comte's positivism, he falls into a sort of relativism and agnosticism. For him, religious truth and reason, Catholicism and freedom, are irreconcilable, and Franchi does not hesitate in his choice.

In 1854, he founded the Ragione, a religious, political, and social weekly, which was a means of propagating these ideas. Terenzio Mamiani, then Minister of Education, appointed him professor of the history of philosophy in the University of Pavia (1860), and later (1863) in the University of Milan, where he remained until 1888.

No work was published by him between 1872 and 1889. In Franchi's last work, he announces his return to the Catholic Church and denounces the opinions and principles of his earlier writings. He criticizes his former works and arguments as being misled by political and philosophical passions.

== Works ==
His works are:

- "Elementi di Grammatica generale applicati alle due lingue italiana e latina" (Genoa, 1848-49), under the name of Cristoforo Bonavino.

Under the name of Ausonio Franchi, he wrote

- "La Filosofia delle scuole italiane" (Capolago, 1852;
- "Appendice", Genoa, 1853);
- "La religione del secolo XIXo" (Lausanne, 1853);
- "Studi filosofici e religiosi: Del Sentimento" (Turin, 1854);
- "Il Razionalismo del Popolo" (Geneva, 1856);
- "Letture sulla Storia della Filosofia moderna; Bacone, Descartes, Spinoza, Malebranche" (Milan, 1863);
- "Sulla Teorica del Giudizio" (Milan, 1870);
- "La Caduta del Principato ecclesiastico e la Restaurazione dell' Impero Germanico" (Milan, 1871);
- "Saggi di critica e polemica" (Milan, 1871-72).

He also edited "Appendice alle Memorie politiche di Felice Orsini" (Turin, 1858); "Epistolario di Giuseppe La Farina" (Milan, 1869); and "Scritti politici di Giuseppe La Farina" (Milan, 1870).
