= Democratic Union for the New Republic =

Defunct political party in Italy

Democratic Union for the New Republic Unione Democratica per la Nuova Repubblica
- President: Randolfo Pacciardi
- Founded: 1 March 1964
- Dissolved: 1980
- Merged into: Italian Republican Party
- Newspaper: Folla; Nuova Repubblica
- Youth wing: Primula Goliardica
- Ideology: Republicanism; Reformism; Conservative liberalism
- Political position: Centre-right
- Colours: Green, white, red

Democratic Union for the New Republic (Italian: Unione Democratica per la Nuova Repubblica, UDNR), usually referred to as New Republic (Nuova Repubblica, NR) was a short-lived political party in Italy founded on 1 March 1964 by Randolfo Pacciardi, a former leading member of the Italian Republican Party (PRI).

== History ==
In 1963, Randolfo Pacciardi had been expelled by the PRI after he had voted against the first Italian centre-left government, which was supported by his party. A few months later, in March 1964, he founded the Democratic Union for the New Republic. The party, which was inspired by Charles de Gaulle's party in France, included several post-fascists such as Enzo Dantini and Antonio Aliotti, from the National Vanguard, and future member of Christian Democracy Vittorio Sbardella. New Republic thus had a right-wing connotation. Its main goals were to transform Italy into a presidential republic and to introduce a plurality voting system.

Connected to New Republic was the university movement Primula Goliardica, later absorbed by Lotta di Popolo. The party's journals were Folla (since 1964) and Nuova Repubblica (since 1966). In 1980 Pacciardi and his followers, whose electoral results had been dismal, returned to the PRI.

== Election results ==
=== Chamber of Deputies ===
Election	Leaders	Votes	%	Seats
1968	Randolfo Pacciardi	63,402	0.20	0 / 630
