= Giovanni Conti (politician) =

Italian politician (1882–1957)

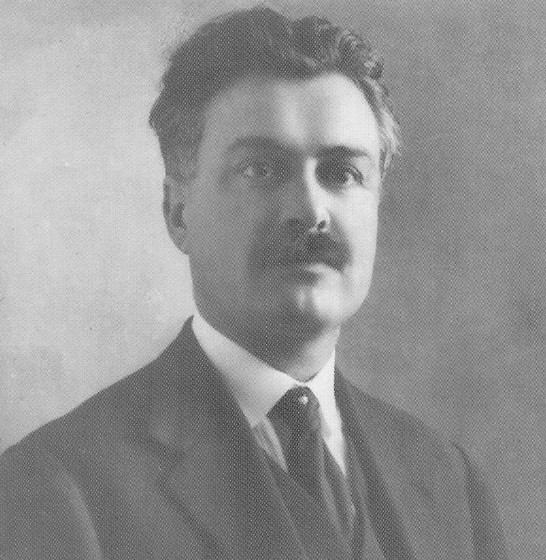
Giovanni Conti

Giovanni Conti (17 November 1882 – 1 March 1957) was a deputy of the Kingdom of Italy and a senator in the Italian Republic.

He was born in Montegranaro, Marche. He became a member of the Italian Republican Party in 1912 and was elected into the Italian Parliament in 1921. He served in the Senate of Italy during Legislature I.

He died in Rome in 1957.
