= First De Gasperi government =

65th and last government of Kingdom of Italy

De Gasperi I Cabinet
- 65th Cabinet of Italy

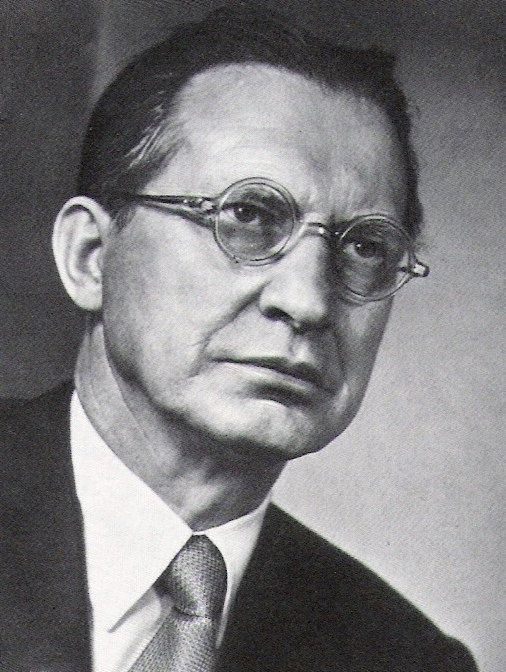
- Date formed: 10 December 1945
- Date dissolved: 13 July 1946

People and organisations
- Head of state: Victor Emmanuel III (1945-1946); Umberto II (1946); Enrico De Nicola (1946-1948)
- Head of government: Alcide De Gasperi
- Total no. of members: 19
- Member parties: DC, PCI, PLI, PSIUP, PdA, PDL
- Status in legislature: National unity government

History
- Predecessor: Parri Cabinet
- Successor: De Gasperi II Cabinet

The first De Gasperi government was the last government of the Kingdom of Italy, which was abolished with the referendum of 2 June 1946, in which the Italian people voted in favour of the Republic. It held office from 10 December 1945 until 13 July 1946, a total of 216 days, or 7 months and 4 days.

== Government parties ==
The government was composed by the following parties:

Party	Ideology	Leader
Christian Democracy	Christian democracy	Alcide De Gasperi
Italian Communist Party	Communism	Palmiro Togliatti
Italian Liberal Party	Liberalism	Benedetto Croce
Italian Socialist Party of Proletarian Unity	Socialism	Pietro Nenni
Action Party	Liberal socialism	Ferruccio Parri
Labour Democratic Party	Social democracy	Ivanoe Bonomi

== Composition ==
Office	Name	Party	Term
Prime Minister	Alcide De Gasperi	DC	10 December 1945–13 July 1946
Deputy Prime Minister	Pietro Nenni	PSIUP	10 December 1945–13 July 1946
Minister of Foreign Affairs	Alcide De Gasperi (ad interim)	DC	10 December 1945–13 July 1946
Minister of the Interior	Giuseppe Romita	PSIUP	10 December 1945–13 July 1946
Minister of Italian Africa	Alcide De Gasperi (ad interim)	DC	10 December 1945–13 July 1946
Minister of Grace and Justice	Palmiro Togliatti	PCI	10 December 1945–13 July 1946
Minister of Finance	Mauro Scoccimarro	PCI	10 December 1945–13 July 1946
Minister of Treasury	Epicarmo Corbino	PLI	10 December 1945–13 July 1946
Minister of War	Manlio Brosio	PLI	10 December 1945–13 July 1946
Minister of the Navy	Raffaele de Courten	Military	10 December 1945–13 July 1946
Minister of the Air Force	Mario Cevolotto	PDL	10 December 1945–13 July 1946
Minister of Public Education	Enrico Molè	PDL	10 December 1945–13 July 1946
Minister of Public Works	Leone Cattani	PLI	10 December 1945–13 July 1946
Minister of Agriculture and Forests	Fausto Gullo	PCI	10 December 1945–13 July 1946
Minister of Transport	Riccardo Lombardi	PdA	10 December 1945–13 July 1946
Minister of Post and Telecommunications	Mario Scelba	DC	10 December 1945–13 July 1946
Minister of Industry and Commerce	Giovanni Gronchi	DC	10 December 1945–13 July 1946
Minister of Labour and Social Security	Gaetano Barbareschi	PSIUP	10 December 1945–13 July 1946
Minister for Reconstruction	Emilio Sereni	PCI	10 December 1945–22 December 1945
Minister for Post-War Assistance	Luigi Gasparotto	PDL	10 December 1945–13 July 1946
Minister of Foreign Trade	Ugo La Malfa	PdA	9 January 1946–20 February 1946
Minister of Foreign Trade	Mario Bracci	PdA	20 February 1946–13 July 1946
Minister without portfolio (National Council)	Alberto Cianca	PdA	10 December 1945–19 February 1946
Minister without portfolio (National Council)	Emilio Lussu	PdA	20 February 1946–13 July 1946
Minister without portfolio (Constituent Assembly)	Pietro Nenni	PSIUP	10 December 1945–19 February 1946
