= Parri government =

65th Government of the Kingdom of Italy

- 64th Cabinet of Italy

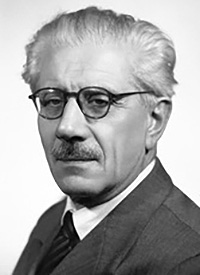
- Date formed: 21 June 1945
- Date dissolved: 10 December 1945

People and organisations
- Head of state: Victor Emmanuel III
- Head of government: Ferruccio Parri
- Total no. of members: 16
- Member party: DC, PCI, PLI, PSIUP, PdA, PDL

History
- Predecessor: Bonomi III Cabinet
- Successor: De Gasperi I Cabinet

The Parri government of Italy held office from 21 June until 10 December 1945, a total of 172 days, or 5 months and 19 days. The reasons for its short period included the complex problems that Italy was experiencing and the limited capacity of Prime Minister Ferruccio Parri.

== Government parties ==
The government was composed by the following parties:

Party	Ideology	Leader
Christian Democracy	Christian democracy	Alcide De Gasperi
Italian Communist Party	Communism	Palmiro Togliatti
Italian Liberal Party	Liberalism	Benedetto Croce
Italian Socialist Party	Socialism	Pietro Nenni
Action Party	Liberal socialism	Ferruccio Parri
Labour Democratic Party	Social democracy	Ivanoe Bonomi

== Composition ==
Portfolio	Minister	Took office	Left office	Party
Prime Minister	Ferruccio Parri	21 June 1945	10 December 1945	PdA
Deputy Prime Minister	Pietro Nenni	1945	1945	PSI
Deputy Prime Minister	Manlio Brosio	1945	1945	PLI
Minister of the Interior	Ferruccio Parri	21 June 1945	8 December 1945	PdA
Minister of Foreign Affairs	Alcide De Gasperi	12 December 1944	18 October 1946	DC
Minister of Grace and Justice	Palmiro Togliatti	21 June 1945	1 July 1946	PCI
Minister of Finance	Mauro Scoccimarro	21 June 1945	2 February 1947	PCI
Minister of Treasury	Marcello Soleri	21 June 1945	22 July 1945	PLI
Minister of Treasury	Federico Ricci	22 July 1945	8 December 1945	Independent
Minister of War	Stefano Jacini	21 June 1945	8 December 1945	DC
Minister of the Navy	Raffaele de Courten	28 July 1943	14 July 1946	Military
Minister of the Air Force	Mario Cevolotto	21 June 1945	14 July 1946	DL
Minister of Industry and Commerce	Giovanni Gronchi	18 June 1944	1 July 1946	DC
Minister of Public Works	Giuseppe Romita	21 June 1945	8 December 1945	PSI
Minister of Labour and Social Security	Gaetano Barbareschi	21 June 1945	13 July 1946	PSI
Minister of Agriculture and Forests	Fausto Gullo	22 April 1944	1 July 1946	PCI
Minister of Public Education	Vincenzo Arangio-Ruiz	12 December 1944	8 December 1945	PLI
Minister of Transport	Ugo La Malfa	17 June 1945	8 December 1945	PdA
Minister of Post and Telecommunications	Mario Scelba	21 June 1945	2 February 1947	DC
Minister of Italian Africa	Ferruccio Parri	21 June 1945	10 December 1945	PdA
Minister for Reconstruction	Meuccio Ruini	21 June 1945	10 December 1945	DL
Minister for Post-War Assistance	Emilio Lussu	21 June 1945	10 December 1945	PdA
Minister of Supply	Enrico Molè	21 June 1945	10 December 1945	DL
Minister for the National Council	Manlio Brosio	21 June 1945	10 December 1945	PLI
Minister for the Constituent Assembly	Pietro Nenni	21 June 1945	10 December 1945	PSI
Secretary of the Council of Ministers	Giorgio Amendola	1945	1945	PCI
Secretary of the Council of Ministers	Giustino Arpesani	1945	1945	PLI
