= Second De Gasperi government =

1st government of the Italian Republic

De Gasperi II Cabinet
- 1st Cabinet of Italy

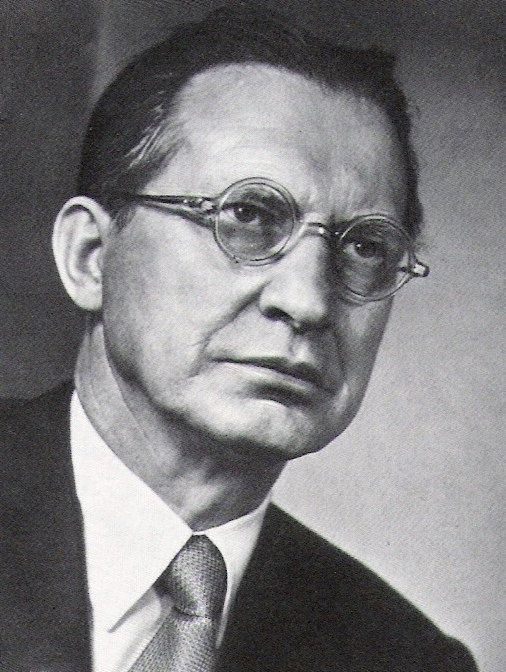
- Date formed: 13 July 1946
- Date dissolved: 2 February 1947

People and organisations
- Head of state: Enrico De Nicola
- Head of government: Alcide De Gasperi
- Total no. of members: 19
- Member party: DC, PSIUP, PCI, PRI
- Status in legislature: National unity government
- Opposition parties: FUQ, BNL

History
- Election: 1946 election
- Legislature term: Constituent Legislature (1946–1948)
- Predecessor: De Gasperi I Cabinet
- Successor: De Gasperi III Cabinet

The second De Gasperi government was the first government of the Italian Republic. It was established by Alcide De Gasperi following the referendum of 2 June 1946, in which the Italian people voted in favour of the Republic. It held office from 13 July 1946 until 2 February 1947, a total of 203 days, or 6 months and 18 days.

== Government parties ==
The government was composed by the following parties:

Party	Ideology	Leader
Christian Democracy (DC)	Christian democracy	Alcide De Gasperi
Italian Socialist Party of Proletarian Unity (PSIUP)	Socialism	Pietro Nenni
Italian Communist Party (PCI)	Communism	Palmiro Togliatti
Italian Republican Party (PRI)	Social liberalism	Randolfo Pacciardi

== Party breakdown ==
=== Beginning of term ===
- Christian Democracy (DC): Prime minister, 7 ministers, 10 undersecretaries
- Italian Socialist Party of Proletarian Unity (PSIUP): 4 ministers, 5 undersecretaries
- Italian Communist Party (PCI): 3 ministers, 5 undersecretaries
- Italian Republican Party (PRI): 2 ministers, 3 undersecretaries
- Italian Liberal Party (PLI): 1 minister

=== End of term ===
- Christian Democracy (DC): Prime minister, 8 ministers, 9 undersecretaries
- Italian Socialist Party of Proletarian Unity (PSIUP): 4 ministers, 6 undersecretaries
- Italian Communist Party (PCI): 3 ministers, 5 undersecretaries
- Italian Republican Party (PRI): 2 ministers, 3 undersecretaries

== Composition ==
Office	Name	Party	Term
Prime Minister	Alcide De Gasperi	DC	13 July 1946–2 February 1947
Minister of Foreign Affairs	Alcide De Gasperi (ad interim)	DC	13 July 1946–17 October 1946
Minister of Foreign Affairs	Pietro Nenni	PSIUP	18 October 1946–2 February 1947
Minister of the Interior	Alcide De Gasperi (ad interim)	DC	13 July 1946–2 February 1947
Minister of Italian Africa	Alcide De Gasperi (ad interim)	DC	13 July 1946–2 February 1947
Minister of Grace and Justice	Fausto Gullo	PCI	13 July 1946–2 February 1947
Minister of Finance	Mauro Scoccimarro	PCI	13 July 1946–2 February 1947
Minister of Treasury	Epicarmo Corbino	PLI	13 July 1946–17 September 1946
Minister of Treasury	Giovanni Battista Bertone	DC	18 September 1946–2 February 1947
Minister of War	Cipriano Facchinetti	PRI	13 July 1946–2 February 1947
Minister of the Navy	Giuseppe Micheli	DC	13 July 1946–2 February 1947
Minister of the Air Force	Mario Cingolani	DC	13 July 1946–2 February 1947
Minister of Public Education	Guido Gonella	DC	13 July 1946–2 February 1947
Minister of Public Works	Giuseppe Romita	PSIUP	13 July 1946–2 February 1947
Minister of Agriculture and Forests	Antonio Segni	DC	13 July 1946–2 February 1947
Minister of Transport	Giacomo Ferrari	PCI	13 July 1946–2 February 1947
Minister of Post and Telecommunications	Mario Scelba	DC	13 July 1946–2 February 1947
Minister of Industry and Commerce	Rodolfo Morandi	PSIUP	13 July 1946–2 February 1947
Minister of Labour and Social Security	Ludovico D'Aragona	PSIUP	13 July 1946–2 February 1947
Minister for Post-War Assistance	Emilio Sereni	PCI	13 July 1946–2 February 1947
Minister of Foreign Trade	Pietro Campilli	DC	13 July 1946–2 February 1947
Minister of Merchant Navy	Salvatore Aldisio	DC	13 July 1946–2 February 1947
Minister without portfolio	Cino Macrelli	PRI	13 July 1946–2 February 1947
Minister without portfolio (Constituent Assembly)	Pietro Nenni	PSIUP	13 July 1946–2 August 1946
Secretary of the Council of Ministers	Paolo Cappa	DC	13 July 1946–2 February 1947
