= Antonio Pesenti (economist) =

Italian economist and politician (1910–1973)

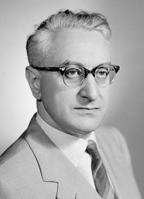

Minister of Finance
- In office 10 December 1944 – 21 June 1945
- Prime Minister: Ivanoe Bonomi
- Preceded by: Stefano Siglienti
- Succeeded by: Mauro Scoccimarro

Personal details
- Born: 5 October 1910 Verona, Venice, Italy
- Died: 11 February 1973 (aged 62) Rome, Italy
- Party: Italian Communist Party
- Education: University of Pavia
- Profession: Economist, professor

Antonio Mario Pesenti (5 October 1910 – 14 February 1973) was an Italian economist and politician of the Italian Communist Party.

== Biography ==
=== Early life ===
Pesenti studied law in Pavia and later joined the underground anti-fascist movement. He moved between London, Vienna, Bern and Paris to attend master's courses in economics where he collaborated with the anti-fascist exiles.

In Paris he published the pamphlet Antifascismo Nuovo under the pseudonym Italicus with the collaboration of the exiles adhering to Giustizia e Libertà. Later he joined the Italian Socialist Party (PSI) and collaborated with its publications.

He participated in the Congress of Italians Abroad against the Abyssinian War held in Paris in October 1935; after speaking against the fascist aggression against Ethiopia in Brussels (disguised and under a false name) at the "Congress of the Italians", he was arrested on his return to Italy on November 8, 1935. Pesenti was sentenced by the Special Court to twenty four years of imprisonment.

In 1938, the PSI card was dedicated to him, together with Rodolfo Morandi and Sandro Pertini, also prisoners in fascist prisons.

Released on 4 September 1943 after serving eight years of harsh imprisonment, he crossed the lines to reach Italy which had already been liberated. In Bari he joined the Italian Communist Party and became director of the newspaper Civiltà Proletaria.

=== Political activity ===
Pesenti took part, in January 1944, in the National Congress of the CLN; in April there was his transfer to Salerno and entry, as undersecretary for finance, into the second Badoglio government; after the liberation of Rome, he participated as minister in the first government of national unity of the CLN chaired by Ivanoe Bonomi and, in December 1944, he obtained the post of minister of finance in the second Bonomi government.

In 1946 he participated in the meetings for the peace treaty in Paris with De Gasperi. From 1946 to 1947 he obtained the vice presidency of the IRI.

Pesenti had been a member of the National Council in 1945 and then of the Constituent Assembly.

He was a member of the central committee of the PCI, of the presidency of the Center for Economic Policy Studies and of the Steering Committee of the Gramsci Institute. Re-elected in subsequent legislatures, in 1953 he opted for the Senate.

=== University teaching and activity ===
From 1968 he devoted himself entirely to teaching and studies, which in the post-war period saw him as the founder of the "Economic Center for Reconstruction" and of the review Economic Criticism and editor of Economic Policy.

He held the chair of Science of Finance and Financial Law at the University of Parma in 1948, then he was full professor of Political Economy in Pisa and Rome. Among his pupils it is possible to mention Gianfranco La Grassa, who became Pesenti's assistant in Pisa.

A year before his death, he published his autobiographical book La cathedra e il bugliolo.

A secondary school in Càscina, in the province of Pisa, has been named after Antonio Pesenti.

== Works ==
- La politica finanziaria e monetaria dell'Inghilterra, Padova, CEDAM, 1934. ISBN 978-88-13-11071-0
- Ricostruire dalle rovine, Milano, O. Picardi, 1946.
- Lezioni di economia politica, 2 voll., Roma, Editori Riuniti, 1959; 1962.
- Lezioni di scienza delle finanze e diritto finanziario, Roma, Editori Riuniti, 1961; 1967.
- Tendenze del capitalismo italiano, con Vincenzo Vitello, Roma, Editori Riuniti, 1962.
- Manuale di economia politica, con Gianfranco La Grassa e Carlo Casarosa, 2 voll., Roma, Editori Riuniti, 1970.
- La cattedra e il bugliolo, Milano, La Pietra, 1972
- Discorsi parlamentari, 2 voll., Roma, Senato della Repubblica, 1990.
- Autobiografia, Milano, Il Sole 24 Ore, 2013.
