= Third De Gasperi government =

2nd government of the Italian Republic

De Gasperi III Cabinet
- 2nd Cabinet of Italy

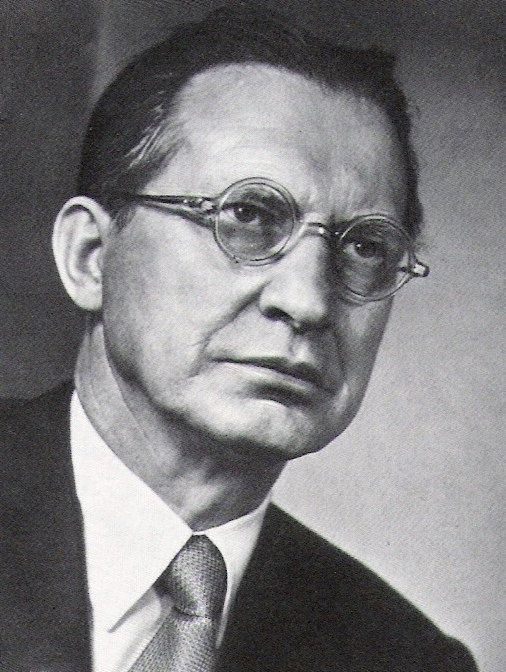
- Date formed: 2 February 1947
- Date dissolved: 31 May 1947

People and organisations
- Head of state: Enrico De Nicola
- Head of government: Alcide De Gasperi
- Total no. of members: 15
- Member parties: DC, PCI, PSI, PDL
- Status in legislature: National unity government

History
- Legislature term: Constituent Legislature (1946–1948)
- Predecessor: De Gasperi II Cabinet
- Successor: De Gasperi IV Cabinet

The third De Gasperi government held office in the Italian Republic from 2 February 1947 until 31 May 1947, a total of 119 days, or 3 months and 30 days.

== Government parties ==
The government was composed by the following parties:

Party	Ideology	Leader
Christian Democracy (DC)	Christian democracy	Alcide De Gasperi
Italian Socialist Party (PSI)	Socialism	Pietro Nenni
Italian Communist Party (PCI)	Communism	Palmiro Togliatti
Labour Democratic Party (PDL)	Social democracy	Ivanoe Bonomi

== Party breakdown ==
- Christian Democracy (DC): Prime minister, 6 ministers, 12 undersecretaries
- Italian Communist Party (PCI): 3 ministers, 6 undersecretaries
- Labour Democratic Party (PDL): 1 minister
- Independents: 1 minister

== Composition ==
Office	Name	Party	Term
Prime Minister	Alcide De Gasperi	DC	2 February 1947–31 May 1947
Minister of Foreign Affairs	Carlo Sforza	Independent	2 February 1947–31 May 1947
Minister of the Interior	Mario Scelba	DC	2 February 1947–31 May 1947
Minister of Italian Africa	Alcide De Gasperi (ad interim)	DC	2 February 1947–31 May 1947
Minister of Grace and Justice	Fausto Gullo	PCI	2 February 1947–31 May 1947
Minister of Finance and Treasury	Pietro Campilli	DC	2 February 1947–31 May 1947
Minister of Defence	Luigi Gasparotto	PDL	2 February 1947–31 May 1947
Minister of Public Education	Guido Gonella	DC	2 February 1947–31 May 1947
Minister of Public Works	Emilio Sereni	PCI	2 February 1947–31 May 1947
Minister of Agriculture and Forests	Antonio Segni	DC	2 February 1947–31 May 1947
Minister of Transport	Giacomo Ferrari	PCI	2 February 1947–31 May 1947
Minister of Post and Telecommunications	Luigi Cacciatore	PSI	2 February 1947–31 May 1947
Minister of Industry and Commerce	Rodolfo Morandi	PSI	2 February 1947–31 May 1947
Minister of Foreign Trade	Ezio Vanoni	DC	2 February 1947–31 May 1947
Minister of Merchant Navy	Salvatore Aldisio	DC	2 February 1947–31 May 1947
Minister of Labour and Social Security	Giuseppe Romita	PSI	2 February 1947–31 May 1947
Secretary of the Council of Ministers	Paolo Cappa	DC	2 February 1947–31 May 1947
