= Epicarmo Corbino =

Italian economist and politician (1890–1984)

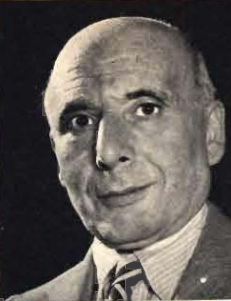

Minister of Treasury
- In office December 1945 – September 1946
- Prime Minister: Alcide De Gasperi

Minister of Industry
- In office 1945–1945

Personal details
- Born: 18 July 1890 Augusta, Sicily, Kingdom of Italy
- Died: 25 April 1984 (aged 93) Naples, Italy
- Party: Italian Liberal Party
- Children

Epicarmo Corbino (18 July 1890 – 25 April 1984) was an Italian academic and economist who served briefly as the minister of industry and the minister of treasury in the 1940s. He was among the most influential Italian economists.

== Biography ==
Corbino was born in Augusta, Sicily, in 1890. He was the brother of Orso Mario Corbino, a politician served in the cabinets of Mussolini.

Epicarmo Corbino was promoted to professorship at the University of Naples in 1923. He was the minister of industry and commerce in the government of Salerno between 11 February and 17 April 1944. He served as minister of the treasury in the first and second cabinets of Prime Minister Alcide De Gasperi from December 1945 to September 1946 when he resigned from the office. Corbino was member of the National Council and then, of the Constituent Assembly until 1953 for the Liberal party.

Carbino left the Liberal Party before the general elections in 1953 and co-founded and headed the National Democratic Alliance in the elections. He collaborated with former Prime Minister Ferruccio Parri in the establishment of the party. However, the party did not manage to win a seat at the parliament.

Between 1959 and 1965 Corbino was the president of the Banco di Napoli. He died in Naples in 1984.

== Views and work ==
As an economist Corbino belonged to the classical school of economics in addition to Marcello Soleri, Pietro Campilli, Luigi Einaudi and Gustavo Del Vecchio. He described himself as an advocate of the approach developed by British economist Alfred Marshall. Therefore, he was an ardent supporter of free enterprise. During the Fascist period Corbino and other liberal economists, including Attilio Cabiati, Edoardo Giretti and Luigi Einaudi did not become closer to the regime.

He was author of many books. Later he also published studies of environmental problems, being one of the pioneers in this field in Italy.
