= Mauro Scoccimarro =

Italian economist and communist politician (1895–1972)

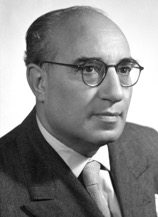

Minister of Finance
- In office December 1945 – January 1947
- Prime Minister: Alcide De Gasperi
- Preceded by: Himself
- Succeeded by: Pietro Campilli
- In office June 1945 – December 1945
- Prime Minister: Ferruccio Parri
- Preceded by: Antonio Pesenti

Minister of Occupied Italy
- In office 12 December 1945 – 21 June 1946
- Prime Minister: Ivanoe Bonomi
- Preceded by: Office established
- Succeeded by: Office abolished

Personal details
- Born: 30 October 1895 Udine, Friuli-Venezia Giulia, Kingdom of Italy
- Died: 2 January 1972 (aged 76) Rome, Italian Republic
- Party: Italian Communist Party
- Education: Ca' Foscari University of Venice

Mauro Scoccimarro (30 October 1895 – 2 January 1972) was an Italian economist and communist politician. He was one of the founders of the Italian Communist Party and served as the minister of finance between 1945 and 1947.

== Early life and education ==
Scoccimarro was born in Udine on 30 October 1895. His father was of Apulian origin and an employee of the railways.

Scoccimarro graduated from Zanon Technical Institute in Udine in October 1913. He attended Ca' Foscari University of Venice and graduated with a bachelor's degree in economics and political science in 1922. He was involved in World War I and joined socialist party in 1917, but following the party congress in Livorno in 1921 he left the party to establish the Communist Party.

== Career ==
Scoccimarro was among the Italian members of the fourth Comintern meeting held in 1922. In 1923 he was made a member of the Communist Party's secretariat together with Antonio Gramsci and Palmiro Togliatti. The same year the party leader Amadeo Bordiga was arrested, and the Comintern Executive Committee assigned a group of party members to lead the party, including Scoccimarro, Palmiro Togliatti, Egidio Gennari, Angelo Tasca and Umberto Terracini. In the party Scoccimarro was part of the faction led by Antonio Gramsci.

Scoccimarro was arrested by the Fascists in 1926 and was sentenced to 21 years in prison. He was released from the prison in 1937, but sent to the Island of Ponza, and then to the Island of Ventotene where he lived under police surveillance until July 1943 when the rule of Benito Mussolini, fascist leader of Italy, was toppled. Following the liberation of Rome in June 1944 Scoccimarro acted as high commissioner for the expulsion of fascists and was the minister of occupied Italy. In the latter capacity he found an opportunity to strengthen the positions of Italian communists in the northern regions of Italy.

Scoccimarro's next post was minister of finance which he held between June and December 1945 in the cabinet of Ferruccio Parri and then, between December 1945 and January 1947 in the second cabinet of Alcide De Gasperi. Scoccimarro was elected as a senator in 1948 and served there until 1972. He also served in different posts in the Communist Party. As of 1966 he was the president of the central control committee. In addition, he was vice president of the Senate from 1958 to 1972.

== Death ==
Scoccimarro died in Rome on 2 January 1972.

== Views and works ==
Scoccimarro was part of the Stalinist faction in the Communist Party in the early 1960s.

Scoccimarro was author of the following books in addition to his other writings:

- La Costituente e il rinnovamento nazionale, 1946
- Dottrina marxista e politica comunista, 1946
- Su alcuni aspetti del nostro programma, 1946
- Il secondo dopoguerra, 2 Bände, 1956
- Nuova democrazia, 1958
- Ideologia e politica, 1960
- La crisi in Alto Adige, Roma, Editori Riuniti, 1960.
- Antonio Gramsci, in Trent'anni di storia italiana, 1915-1945. Dall'antifascismo alla Resistenza, Torino, Einaudi, 1961.
- Ideologia marxista e programmazione economica, Roma, Editori Riuniti, 1965.
- Il rinnovamento e il rafforzamento del partito, Roma, Editori Riuniti, 1966.

Preceded by Office established	Minister of Occupied Italy; 1944–1945	Succeeded by Office abolished
Preceded by Antonio Pesenti	Minister of Finance; 1945–1947	Succeeded by Pietro Campilli
