= Luigi Gasparotto =

Italian lawyer and politician

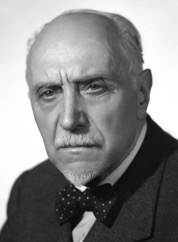

Minister of Defence
- In office 4 February 1947 – 1 June 1947
- Prime Minister: Alcide De Gasperi
- Preceded by: Cipriano Facchinetti (War); Giuseppe Micheli (Navy); Mario Cingolani (Air Force)
- Succeeded by: Mario Cingolani

Minister for Post-War Assistance
- In office 10 December 1945 – 13 July 1946
- Prime Minister: Alcide De Gasperi
- Preceded by: Emilio Lussu
- Succeeded by: Emilio Sereni

Minister of the Air Force
- In office 14 January 1945 – 21 June 1945
- Prime Minister: Ivanoe Bonomi
- Preceded by: Carlo Scialoja
- Succeeded by: Mario Cevolotto

Minister of War
- In office 4 July 1921 – 26 February 1922
- Prime Minister: Ivanoe Bonomi
- Preceded by: Giulio Rodinò
- Succeeded by: Pietro Lanza di Scalea
Member of the Parliament
Member of the Senate
In office 8 May 1948 – 24 June 1953
| Constituency | Senator by right |
Member of the Constituent Assembly
In office 25 June 1946 – 31 January 1948
| Constituency | Single national constituency |
Member of the Chamber of Deputies of Kingdom of Italy
In office 27 November 1913 – 9 December 1928
| Constituency | Milan |

Personal details
- Born: 31 May 1873 Sacile, Friuli-Venezia Giulia, Italy
- Died: 29 June 1954 (aged 81) Cantello, Lombardy, Italy
- Party: Labour Democratic Party
- Education: University of Padua
- Profession: Lawyer

Luigi Gasparotto (31 May 1873 – 29 June 1954) was an Italian lawyer and politician. He served several times as a government minister and was one of the founders of the Labour Democratic Party. He was also president of Fiera Milano.

== Biography ==
Gasparotto was born in Sacile, Province of Pordenone. His father, Leopoldo Gasparotto, a small landowner and Garibaldian, educated him to democratic and secular ideals. Moving to Milan, he practised the profession of lawyer and frequented the Lombard Democratic Society. From 1897 he adhered to Freemasonry, attending the Milanese institution.

Gasparotto opposed to the Italian military intervention in Libia in 1911-1912 and was elected deputy of the Kingdom of Italy in Milan in 1913. As a combatant during World War I, he was decorated with three ilver Medals of Military Valor. After the war, he was among the founders of the National Combatants Association and promoted a movement of ex-combatants called "National Renewal," of radical inspiration, with which he was reconfirmed in the Chamber of Deputies in 1919, and again in June 1921 with Social Democracy.

Gasparotto served as Minister of War from July 1921 to February 1922 in the First Bonomi government, during which he promoted the rite of the Unknown Soldier. Elected deputy again in 1924, he was vice president of the Chamber. Although he did not adhere to the Aventine Secession against Benito Mussolini, he was part of the opposition in the courtroom and resigned as vice president in December 1926. After the legislature ended in 1928, he withdrew from political life.

After the armistice of Cassibile of September 1943, Gasparotto was part of a committee of anti-fascists that tried to organize, without success, the defence of Milan against the Germans. His son Leopoldo became an Italian resistance movement leader, but was captured by the Germans in December 1943 and killed in Fossoli on 22 June 1944.

In the transitional constitutional period, Gasparotto was Minister of the Air Force from January to June 1945. At the end of World War II in 1945, he was called to the National Council and from December 1945 to July 1946 he was Minister for Post-War Assistance in the First De Gasperi government. Elected Deputy to the Constituent Assembly in June 1946 for the National Democratic Union, he was the first Italian Minister of Defence, created by the merger of three ministries (War, Navy, and Air Force) under the Third De Gasperi government (February – May 1947).

Senator of the Republic by appointment, in Legislature I (1948), after the resignation of Giuseppe Paratore, Gasparotto was nominated for the Presidency of the Senate, but he renounced his candidacy shortly before the vote. He was vice-president of the mixed group until 1953.

Gasparotto died on 29 June 1954 in his country house in Cantello.
