= Ministry of Occupied Italy =

Italian government ministry

- Ministero dell'Italia occupata
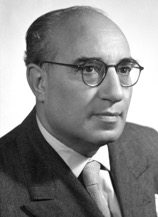
- Mauro Scoccimarro, the only person to serve as Minister of Occupied Italy

Ministry of the Kingdom of Italy overview
- Formed: 12 December 1944; 81 years ago
- Dissolved: 5 July 1945; 81 years ago
- Superseding Ministry of the Kingdom of Italy: Ministry for Post-War Assistance
- Jurisdiction: Government of Italy
- Minister responsible: Mauro Scoccimarro

The Ministry of Occupied Italy (Italian: Ministero dell'Italia occupata) was the government body of the Kingdom of Italy responsible for affairs in portions of Italy under Axis occupation during World War II. The ministry existed from December 1944 to July 1945.

== History ==
Fascist Italy — the Kingdom of Italy under Prime Minister Benito Mussolini — entered World War II on the side of the Axis powers in June 1940. On 9 September 1943, Italy surrendered to the Allies, and the Kingdom of Italy, which controlled southern Italy, switched to the Allied side, entering a status of co-belligerence with them. In response, Nazi Germany forcibly occupied the rest of Italy and installed Mussolini as the leader of the Italian Social Republic in northern Italy, which continued the war on the Axis side. An Italian resistance movement arose to combat the German occupation and the Italian Social Republic.

On 8 September 1943, the National Liberation Committee (Italian: Comitato di Liberazione Nazionale, or CLN) was formed as a political umbrella organization and to serve as the main representative of the Italian resistance movement. On 9 January 1944, the CLN approved the creation of the Corpo Volontari della Libertà (CVL, "Volunteers of Freedom Corps") to serve as a general command to coordinate the actions of the various partisan groups of the resistance, and the CVL became operational on 9 June 1944. Meanwhile, on 7 February 1944 the National Liberation Committee for Northern Italy (Italian: Comitato di Liberazione Nazionale Alta Italia, or CLNAI) was established in Milan to serve as the Kingdom of Italy's "shadow" government in northern Italy, provide direction to the Italian resistance movement from within the Italian Social Republic itself, and provide assistance to the population of northern Italy.

The Third Bonomi government established the Ministry of Occupied Italy with Decree Number 395 of 12 December 1944 to coordinate Italian government relations with the CLNAI and the CVL, as well as to provide assistance to the population of northern Italy living under German occupation and Italian fascist control. The war ended in Europe on 8 May 1945, and on 21 June 1945 Lieutenancy Decree Number 380 established the new Ministry for Post-War Assistance (Italian: Ministero dell'assistenza postbellica). The Ministry of Occupied Italy was abolished with Lieutenancy Decree Number 391 on 5 July 1945, and its responsibilities were transferred to the Ministry for Post-War Assistance.

== Leadership ==
Mauro Scoccimarro of the Italian Communist Party (Italian: Partito Comunista Italiano, PCI) was the only person to serve as the Minister of Occupied Italy, leaving the office on 21 June 1945. As minister, he found an opportunity to strengthen the positions of Italian communists in the northern regions of Italy.

Aldobrando Medici Tornaquinci of the Italian Liberal Party (Italian: Partito Liberale Italiano) served as the ministry's undersecretary of state until 21 June 1945. By ministerial decree of 26 February 1945, he was appointed President of the Central Commission for the Investigation of Atrocities Committed by the Germans and Fascists After 25 July 1943 (Italian: Commissione Centrale per l’accertamento delle atrocità commesse dai tedeschi e dai fascisti dopo il 25 luglio 1943).

== Activities ==
In 1945, the Central Commission for War Crimes (Italian: Commissione Centrale per i crimini di guerra) was established under the ministry's undersecretariat. It worked to ascertain the war crimes the Germans and Italian fascists committed against the Italian civilian population between 25 July 1943 and the end of World War II.

The ministry edited the book Brigata Sinigaglia ("Sinigaglia Brigade"), the first book on the armed struggle of the Italian resistance movement released in Italy; 10,000 copies of it were published at the end of the war. The ministry also oversaw the production of Giorni di gloria ("Days of Glory"), a 1945 propaganda film about the Italian resistance movement.

== See also ==
- Government of Italy
- Italian campaign (World War II)
- Italian Civil War
- Italian resistance movement
- Italian Social Republic
- Kingdom of the South
- Operation Achse
