= Antonio Pesenti =

Antonio Pesenti may refer to:

- Antonio Pesenti (cyclist)
- Antonio Pesenti (economist)
