= Giuseppe Romita =

Italian politician (1887–1958)

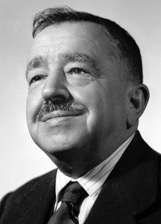

Minister of Public Works
- In office 21 June 1945 – 8 December 1945
- Prime Minister: Ferruccio Parri
- Preceded by: Meuccio Ruini
- Succeeded by: Leone Cattani
- In office 13 July 1946 – 2 February 1947
- Prime Minister: Alcide De Gasperi
- Preceded by: Leone Cattani
- Succeeded by: Emilio Sereni
- In office 10 February 1954 – 20 May 1957
- Prime Minister: Mario Scelba; Antonio Segni
- Preceded by: Umberto Merlin
- Succeeded by: Giuseppe Togni
Member of the Italian Parliament
Member of the Chamber of Deputies
In office 22 July 1953 – 15 March 1958
Constituency	Cuneo
Member of the Senate of the Republic
In office 8 May 1948 – 24 June 1953
Constituency	Senator by right
Member of the Constituent Assembly
In office 25 June 1946 – 31 January 1948
Constituency	Cuneo
Member of the National Council
In office 25 September 1945 – 1 June 1946
Member of the Chamber of Deputies of the Kingdom of Italy
In office 1 December 1919 – 9 November 1926

Personal details
- Born: 7 January 1887 Tortona, Kingdom of Italy
- Died: 15 May 1958 (aged 71) Rome, Italy
- Party: PSDI (1951–1958)
- Other political affiliations: PSI (1903–1926; 1942–1949); PSU (1949–1951)
- Children: 2
- Education: Polytechnic University of Turin

Giuseppe Romita (7 January 1887 – 15 March 1958) was an Italian socialist politician. He served several times as a cabinet minister and member of the Italian Parliament.

== Early life and education ==
The son of Guglielmo Romita and Maria Gianneli, Giuseppe Romita came from a poor family: his father was a farmer and later foreman with three sons and three daughters. Despite his humble origins, Romita obtained his diploma as a surveyor in Alessandria. In the autumn of 1907 he enrolled in the engineering course at the Polytechnic University of Turin, giving private mathematics lessons to support himself in his studies.

== Political career ==
Barely sixteen, in 1903 Romita enrolled in the Italian Socialist Party (PSI) first in Alessandria and then in the Turin section, becoming an executive member of the local section of the Italian Socialist Youth Federation (FIGS) and a local correspondent for its newspaper, Avanguardia. At the FIGS congress on 18 October 1910, Romita joined the national council embracing the anti-monarchical and republican theses. He was secretary of the PSI section of Turin in 1911, increasing his political involvement and at the same time managing to graduate in engineering at the Polytechnic in 1913. In June 1914 he was elected to the municipal councils of both Tortona and Turin. He returned to the secretariat of the Turin section of the PSI following the arrest of the previous secretary and therefore participated in the "bread revolt" of August 1917, ending up in jail until April 1918. After the First World War, in the elections of 16 November 1919, he was elected to parliament. In 1920 he married Maria Stella, and had two children, Gemma (born in 1922) and Pier Luigi Romita (born in 1924), who in turn became an important post-war social democratic politician. During the red two-year period that led to the occupation of the factories, Romita, also thanks to his being an engineer, was committed to directing industrial production in the Turin factories to ensure their operational continuity during workers' occupations.

In January 1921, following the Livorno split, Romita chose to remain in the PSI and in May of that same year he was re-elected to parliament. In October 1922 the PSI sanctioned the expulsion of the gradualist tendency, which Romita tried to prevent by mediating to the last. At the fourth congress of the Third international he defended the reasons for socialist autonomy, becoming its main advocate in the party. His ideas, supported by Nenni at the extraordinary congress of the PSI in April 1923, prevented attempts to merge the party with the Communist Party of Italy (PCdI). At the last elections in the spring of 1924 he was re-elected to parliament. On 5 November 1926 the fascist government dissolved all political parties.

During the XXVII legislature of the Kingdom, Romita participated in the Aventine Secession and experienced the slow decline of the parliamentary mandate during the course of 1925. Following the Fascist decree that dissolved the parties, many of the PSI leadership team decided to go into exile in Paris, but Romita decided to stay in Italy. He was arrested on 16 November 1926 and sentenced to five years of confinement, first in Pantelleria and then in the more unreachable Ustica. In 1927 he was transferred to the Ucciardone prison in Palermo, accused of crimes against the regime. He was acquitted but confined to the island of Ponza. He was granted parole in 1929 but was expelled from the register of engineers. Returning to Turin in 1930, he immediately tried with other comrades and trade unionists to reorganize the socialist presence but was arrested again on 31 August 1931. He was sentenced to confinement at Veroli where he could be joined by his family. Returning to freedom on 20 June 1933, he settled in Rome. He managed, despite the outbreak of the war, to establish a nucleus of socialists and even to refound a socialist executive in hiding, of which he was elected secretary with a mandate to take care of northern Italy. Operating in difficult conditions he managed to reconstitute the Socialist Party in 1942, which subsequently merged with Lelio Basso's Movement of Proletarian Unity and the Italian Proletarian Union, thus becoming the Italian Socialist Party of Proletarian Unity (PSIUP). The day after the fateful 8 September 1943 the National Liberation Committee was formed, in which Romita together with Nenni was called to represent the PSIUP. In 1944 he was appointed vice-president of the Chamber of Deputies, a merely honorary title given the vicissitudes of the moment.

At the end of World War II he held the role of minister in four different governments (minister of public works in the Parri Cabinet and De Gasperi II Cabinet, minister of interior in the De Gasperi I Cabinet, and minister of labour in the De Gasperi III Cabinet) from 5 June 1945 to 31 May 1947, before the left parties went into opposition following the parliamentary elections of 1948. Romita left the PSI in June 1949, and in December of that year he founded the Unitary Socialist Party (PSU). In 1951 the PSU merged with the Socialist Party of Italian Workers, led by Giuseppe Saragat, to form a new party called the Socialist Party – Italian Section of the Socialist International (PS-SIIS), which in 1952 was renamed the Italian Democratic Socialist Party (PSDI). In 1954 he was again appointed minister of public works and held that office for the following three years (Scelba Cabinet and Segni I Cabinet). Subsequently he continued to work for socialist unity in an autonomist key, especially after the opening of the PSI at its Venice congress in 1957. He was elected to the central committee of the PSDI at the Milan congress in 1957. He died in Rome on 15 March 1958 at the age of 71 from a heart attack.

Preceded by Ezio Vigorelli	Secretary of the Italian Democratic Socialist Party; 1952	Succeeded by Giuseppe Saragat
