= Ludovico D'Aragona =

Italian politician (1876–1961)

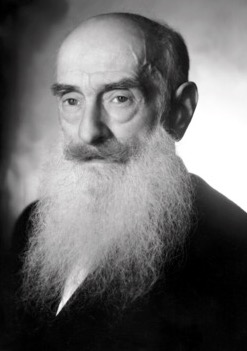
Ludovico D'Aragona

Ludovico D'Aragona (23 May 1876 – 17 June 1961) was an Italian socialist politician who held several government posts. He also served at the Italian Parliament and Senate.

== Biography ==
D'Aragona was born in Cernusco sul Naviglio, Milan, on 23 May 1876. In 1892 he joined the Socialist Party of Italian Workers. He was sentenced several times and was forced into exile. He settled in France in 1895 and in Switzerland in 1898.

After returning to Italy in 1900 he became municipal councilor of Milan which he also held in 1904. He was among the cofounders of the metalworkers union. From 1909 he had important positions within the General Confederation of Labor of which he was the secretary from 1918 to 1925. Then he lived in Paris until the end of Fascist rule in Italy. He served at the Italian Parliament for two terms following World War II. In 1947 he left the Italian Socialist Party to join the Italian Democratic Socialist Party of which he was the general secretary in the period 1948–1949. He was a member of the Italian Senate between 1948 and 1953.

D'Aragona served as the minister of labor and social security in the second government of Alcide De Gasperi between 1946 and 1947. Giuseppe Romita succeeded him as minister of labor and social security. D'Aragona was the minister of posts and communications in the fourth cabinet of De Gasperi and minister of transport in the sixth cabinet of De Gasperi.

In addition, D'Aragona was the director of the weekly magazine Il Lavoro socialista in 1946, of the fortnightly magazine Battaglie sindacali in the period 1947–1948, and of the weekly magazine Democrazia socialista in 1949. He died in Rome on 17 June 1961.

Preceded by Ugo Guido Mondolfo	Secretary of the Italian Democratic Socialist Party; 1949	Succeeded by Giuseppe Saragat
