= Pietro Campilli =

Italian economist and politician (1891–1974)

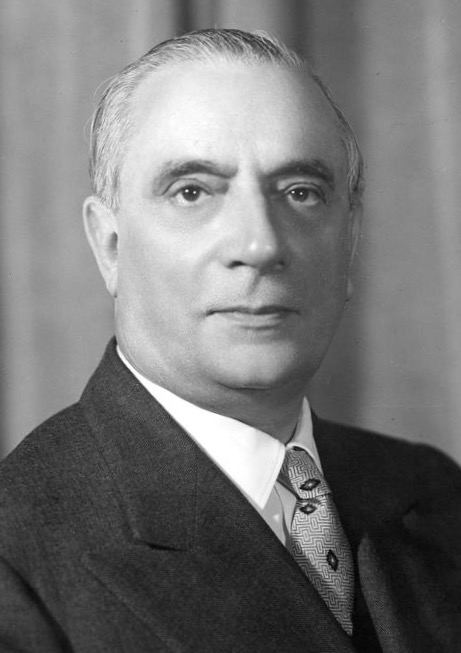

President of the European Investment Bank
- In office February 1958 – May 1959
- Preceded by: Office established

Personal details
- Born: 30 November 1891 Frascati, Kingdom of Italy
- Died: 8 July 1974 (aged 82) Rome, Italy
- Party: Italian People's Party; Christian Democracy

Pietro Campilli (1891–1974) was an Italian economist and politician who held several cabinet posts during the 1940s and 1950s. He was the first president of the European Investment Bank and served in the post between 1958 and 1959.

== Early life and education ==
Campilli was born in Frascati on 30 November 1891. He received a diploma in accounting and a degree in economics and commerce. As an economist Campilli belonged to the classical school of economics in addition to Luigi Einaudi, Epicarmo Corbino and Gustavo Del Vecchio.

== Career ==
Campilli was a member of the Italian People's Party, but during the Fascist rule he did not involve in political life and worked as a banker becoming the director general of the Italian Banking Federation. He joined the Christian Democrats and became part of the Rome Liberation Committee during the resistance against Fascists. Following the end of the Fascist rule he was elected deputy to the National Council and then to Constituent Assembly where he served for two terms.

Campilli served as cabinet member several times. He was the minister of foreign trade in the second cabinet of Alcide De Gasperi between 1946 and 1947 and the minister of treasury and finance in the next De Gasperi cabinet in 1947. Before Campilli's appointment to the cabinet the ministry of treasury and finance was redesigned and expanded through the merge of treasury ministry and finance ministry. He also served as the minister without portfolio and then the minister of transport in the sixth cabinet of De Gasperi from 1950 and 1951, the minister of industry and commerce in the seventh cabinet of De Gasperi in the period 1951–1953), minister without portfolio in the cabinet of De Gasperi in 1953 and in the Pella cabinet between 1953 and 1954. He held the same post in the cabinets of Fanfani (1954), Scelba (1954–1955), Segni (1955–1957) and Zoli (1957–1958). He was the president of the European Investment Bank from February 1958 to May 1959 and named as the president of the National Council of Economy and Labor in May 1959 which he held until 1970. He also served as the president of the Italian Arbitration Association in late 1960s.

== Death ==
Campilli died in Rome on 8 July 1974.
