= Giacomo Ferrari (politician) =

Italian engineer and politician (1887–1974)

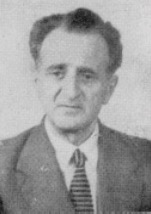

Mayor of Parma
- In office October 1951 – February 1963

Minister of Transport
- In office 13 June 1946 – 31 May 1947
- Prime Minister: Alcide De Gasperi

Personal details
- Born: 5 November 1887 Langhirano, Kingdom of Italy
- Died: 22 August 1974 (aged 86) Bosco di Corniglio, Italy
- Resting place: Viletta cemetery, Parma
- Party: Italian Socialist Party; Italian Communist Party
- Education: Polytechnic University of Turin
- Occupation: Industrial engineer

Giacomo Ferrari (1887–1974) was an Italian industrial engineer and communist politician. He served as a minister of transport between 1946 and 1947. He was a member of the Italian Senate and was the mayor of Parma from 1951 to 1953.

== Early life and education ==
Ferrari was born in Langhirano, Province of Parma, on 5 November 1887 into a wealthy bourgeois family. He became interested in scientific socialism in his youth and joined the Italian Socialist Party in 1902. He studied mathematics in Parma for two years and then attended the Polytechnic University of Turin. He received a degree in industrial engineering in December 1912.

== Career and activities ==
Following his graduation, Ferrari worked as an engineer in Apulia. He joined the army and fought in World War I as an artillery lieutenant. He was discharged from the army in 1920 and returned to Parma where he worked in the consortium of cooperatives. He left Italy for France on 13 December 1931 due to the increase of the Fascist rule's oppression and settled in Toulouse. In 1942 Ferrari returned to Italy and joined the Italian Communist Party. He was among the founders of the National Liberation Committee of Parma and involved in the armed struggle against the Fascist forces.

After the end of the Fascist rule, Ferrari was elected as a deputy from the Communist Party to the Constituent Assembly on 2 June 1946. He was appointed minister of transport to the second De Gasperi government on 13 June and held the post also in the third De Gasperi government until 31 May 1947. Ferrari was elected to the Senate in 1948 for the Panna constituency, obtaining 52,367 votes. From October 1951 to February 1963 he was mayor of Parma.

On 28 April 1963 Ferrari was re-elected to the Senate from the Parma constituency, receiving 51,537 votes. In the next elections held on 19 May 1968, he was also elected as a senator with 61,048 votes. At the end of the term in 1970 he retired from politics.

== Later years, personal life and death ==
Ferrari directed the consortium of development of the province of Parma and was involved in constructing the Cisa motorway. He was also the first president of the Institute of Verdi Studies.

Ferrari was married and had children. One of his sons was a medical doctor and was killed in a Nazi-fascist ambush in Ponte di Lugagnano on 20 November 1944. He died in Bosco di Corniglio on 22 August 1974. He was buried at the Villetta cemetery.

=== Legacy ===
A foundation was established in Parma to honour his memory. In 2004 a book about his life and activities was published, Giacomo Ferrari: Un uomo, una terra, una storia (Italian: Giacomo Ferrari: One man, one land, one story) (ISBN 9788843028214). Another book was published in 2022 entitled L' ingegnere delle barricate: Autobiografia di Giacomo Ferrari il nobile rivoluzionari (Italian: The engineer of the barricades. Autobiography of Giacomo Ferrari the noble revolutionary) (ISBN 9788890852428) which features articles about his struggle against Fascists in Parma in 1922.
