= Minister of the Air Force (Italy) =

Ministry in the Cabinet of Italy

Minister of Air Force
- Ministri dell'Aeronautica
- Flag of the minister of aeronautics

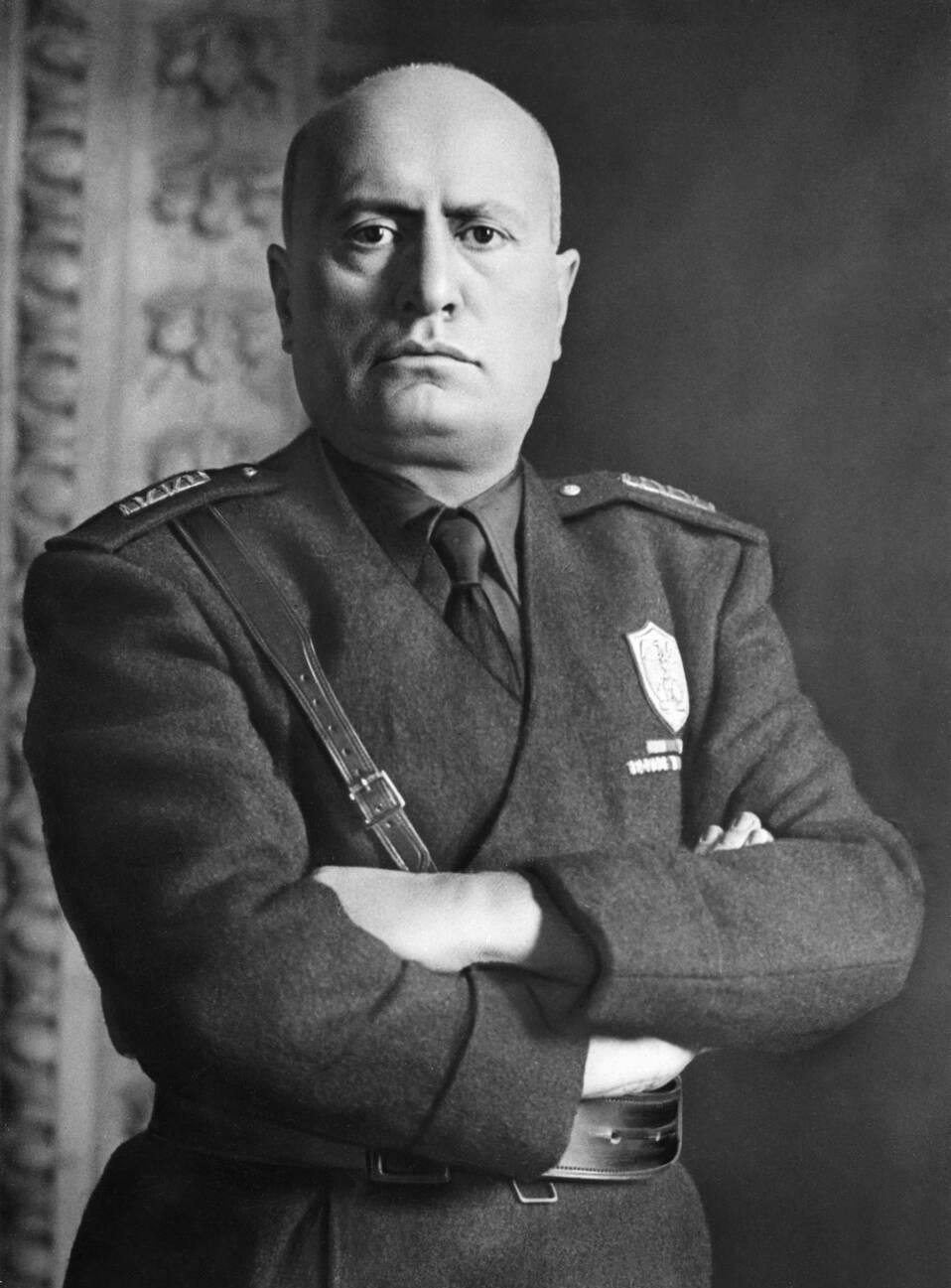
- Longest serving Benito Mussolini; 3 January 1926–12 September 1929; 6 November 1933–25 July 1943
- Ministry of Aeronautics
- Member of: Council of Ministers
- Seat: Rome
- Term length: No fixed term
- Formation: 30 August 1925
- First holder: Benito Mussolini (act.)
- Final holder: Mario Cingolani
- Abolished: 4 February 1947
- Succession: Minister of Defence

The minister of the air force of Italy, was the minister responsible for the Ministry of Aeronautics, which oversaw both military aviation — the Regia Aeronautica ("Royal Air Force") until 1946, then the Aeronautica Militare (Italian Air Force) until 1947 — and civil aviation. The position was created in 1925 during the Mussolini Cabinet and was abolished in 1947 with the creation of the position of Minister of Defence.

== List of ministers ==
=== Kingdom of Italy ===
Parties:

- National Fascist Party
- Military
- Labour Democratic Party

Coalitions:

- Fascist
- Mixed coalition

Other:

- Acting

N.	Portrait	Name (Born–Died)	Term of office			Party	Government	Ref.
N.	Portrait	Name (Born–Died)	Took office	Left office	Time in office	Party	Government	Ref.
1		Benito Mussolini (1883–1945); As Prime Minister	30 August 1925	3 January 1926	126 days	National Fascist Party	Mussolini	
1		Benito Mussolini (1883–1945); As Prime Minister	3 January 1926	12 September 1929	3 years, 252 days	National Fascist Party	Mussolini	
2		Italo Balbo (1896–1940)	12 September 1929	6 November 1933	4 years, 55 days	National Fascist Party	Mussolini	
(1)		Benito Mussolini (1883–1945); As Prime Minister	6 November 1933	25 July 1943	9 years, 261 days	National Fascist Party	Mussolini	
3		Renato Sandalli (1897–1968)	28 July 1943	18 June 1944	326 days	Military	Badoglio I·II	
4		Pietro Piacentini (1898–1963)	18 June 1944	10 December 1944	175 days	Military	Bonomi II	
5		Carlo Scialoja (1886–1947)	10 December 1944	14 January 1945	33 days	Labour Democratic Party	Bonomi III	
6		Luigi Gasparotto (1873–1954)	14 January 1945	19 June 1945	156 days	Labour Democratic Party	Bonomi III	
7		Mario Cevolotto (1887–1953)	19 June 1945	13 July 1946	1 year, 24 days	Labour Democratic Party	Parri; De Gasperi I	

=== Republic of Italy ===
Parties:

- Christian Democracy

Coalitions:

- Mixed coalition

N.	Portrait	Name (Born–Died)	Term of office			Party	Government	Ref.
N.	Portrait	Name (Born–Died)	Took office	Left office	Time in office	Party	Government	Ref.
1		Mario Cingolani (1883–1971)	13 July 1946	4 February 1947	206 days	Christian Democracy	De Gasperi II	
Minister of Defence (see list)

== See also ==
- Minister of Defence (Italy)
- Minister of the Navy (Italy)
- Minister of War (Italy)
