= Trentino People's Party =

Trentino People's Party Partito Popolare Trentino
- Abbreviation: PPT/TVP
- Leader: Alcide De Gasperi
- Founded: 1904
- Dissolved: 1919
- Merged into: Italian People's Party
- Headquarters: Trento, Austria
- Ideology: Christian democracy Italian-speaking minority interests Regionalism
- Political position: Centre
- Colours: black

The Trentino People's Party (Italian: Partito Popolare Trentino), previously the People's Political Union of Trentino (Unione Politica Popolare del Trentino), was a political party in Austria-Hungary, founded in 1904 in support of Italian minorities in Trentino. Its leader was Alcide De Gasperi, who went on to serve as the prime minister of Italy from 1945 to 1953.

== History ==
In the 1911 Cisleithanian legislative election the PPT was the second largest Italian party in the Vienna Parliament, after having been the largest in the 1907 election.

In 1920, after the annexation of Trentino into Italy, the PPT was merged into the Italian People's Party.

== Electoral results ==
=== Imperial Council ===
Imperial Council
Election year	# of overall votes	% of overall vote	# of overall seats won	+/–	Leader
1907	40,943 (#1 IT)	0.9	7 / 516	–	Enrico Conci
1911	40,543 (#1 IT)	0.9	7 / 516	–	Alcide De Gasperi

=== Regional Council ===
Landtag of Tyrol
Election year	# of overall votes	% of overall vote	# of elective seats won	+/-	Leader
1914	40,343 (#1 IT)	35.9	7 / 25	–	Alcide De Gasperi
