= Corpo Volontari della Libertà =

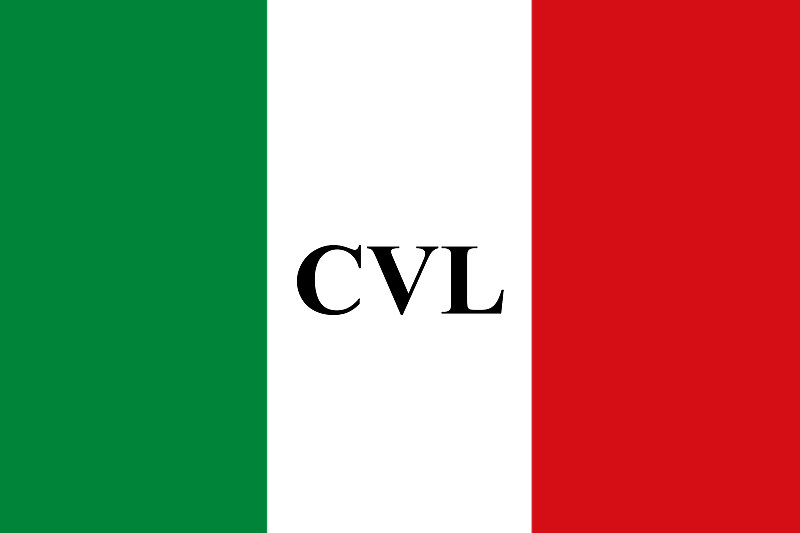
Flag of the CVL

The Corpo Volontari della Libertà (CVL, "Volunteers of Freedom Corps") was the unified command structure of the Italian Resistance during the Second World War, recognized both by the Allies and the "southern" Italian governments.

== History ==
Starting from September 1943, following the German occupation of Italy in the wake of the Armistice of Cassibile and the establishment of the Italian Social Republic, irregular formations of partisans took up arms against the German occupiers and their Fascist allies. On 9 January 1944, the National Liberation Committee approved the creation of a general command to coordinate the action of the various partisan groups; the provision became operative on 9 June 1944.

=== Summer-autumn 1944 ===
The general command thus established operated by issuing general rules, forming regional commands and internal sections (overseeing operations, sabotage actions, mobilization and logistics) and providing, as far as possible, a unified direction to the partisan struggle. The CVL established its headquarters in Milan; the first commanders were Luigi Longo who represented the Garibaldi Brigades (Italian Communist Party), Ferruccio Parri for the Justice and Freedom Brigades (Action Party), Enrico Mattei for the People's Brigades (Christian Democracy), Giovanni Battista Stucchi for the Matteotti Brigades (Italian Socialist Party) and Major Mario Argenton for the autonomous formations. Giuseppe Borea served as chaplain.

Besides military operations, the activities of the CVL dealt with the air supply of weapons and material by the Allies, intelligence gathering for the Allies, assistance and health services for the partisans and their families, and the propaganda against the Fascist regime. In August 1944, General Raffaele Cadorna jr was parachuted in northern Italy and reached Milan, where he assumed the role of military advisor to the CVL on a mandate from the Bonomi II Cabinet and the Allied command. His arrival changed the internal balance of the CVL, which until then had been mainly governed by Longo and Parri, and created a "triumvirate".

=== Winter of 1944-45 ===
The summer of 1944 marked the apex of the partisan offensive, carried out in the hope of an imminent total defeat of the Axis Powers and in preparation for a general uprising, with the establishment of several partisan republics and free zones deep inside Axis-occupied territory. On 13 November 1944, however, General Harold Alexander unexpectedly issued a proclamation requiring to stop all organized operations and to settle on defensive positions in view of the winter. On 2 December 1944 the CVL issued a directive for the "dynamic" application of Alexander's message; the Allies' instructions to move some partisan groups and activities from the mountains to the plains were accepted, while the order to suspend the guerrilla activity was not. On 7 December 1944, an agreement known as the Rome Protocols was signed in Rome between a delegation of the CVL representing the National Liberation Committee for Northern Italy and the Allies on the structure and functioning of the command, which saw Cadorna as overall commander and Parri and Longo as deputy commanders for operations, with de facto control of most of the combat formations.

German and fascist repression intensified during the winter, and Parri was arrested by the SS in Milan while returning from the mission in Rome; after a failed attempt by the partisans to free him, he was released following a negotiation by OSS agent Allen Welsh Dulles with the SS commander Karl Wolff. In February 1945 General Cadorna resigned from the general command, in protest at the lack of definition of his authority as commander; his resignation, however, was not accepted and on 28 February Cadorna withdrew it, after which he left for a mission that took him to Switzerland, Lyon and in Allied-controlled Italy with Parri, in order to define together with the Allies the plan for a general insurrection in view of the breakthrough on the Gothic Line.

=== Spring 1945 ===
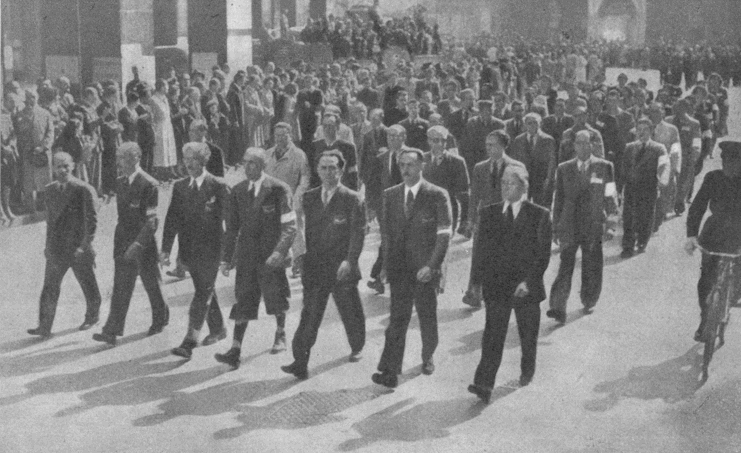
The command of the CVL (front row) during the liberation parade in Milan, on 6 May 1945. Left to right are Mario Argenton, Giovanni Battista Stucchi, Ferruccio Parri, Raffaele Cadorna, Luigi Longo, Enrico Mattei, and Fermo Solari.

In March–April 1945 the partisan formations were unified into military units under the command of the CVL. On 16 April the order was issued to move on to the implementation of the pre-established plans and on the 23rd to "intensify the action for the decisive battle". The partisans liberated Milan and Genoa on 26 April 1945, Turin on 28 April, and Cuneo and Padua on 29 April, disarming and capturing thousands of Fascist troops.

After the end of the hostilities, as agreed with the Allies, by 15 June 1945 the partisan formations of the CVL proceeded to return their weapons, dissolving as an armed organization and devolving all power to the Allied authorities and to the Italian government.

=== Postwar ===
In 1945 the flag of the CVL was awarded the Gold Medal of Military Valour. In 1958 the CVL was officially recognized as part of the Italian Armed Forces.

== Command ==
Initially, the military command of the CLN was formed by Manlio Brosio (Italian Liberal Party), Giorgio Amendola (Italian Communist Party), Riccardo Bauer (Action Party), Giuseppe Spataro (Christian Democracy), Sandro Pertini (Italian Socialist Party) and Mario Cevolotto (Labour Democratic Party). In June 1944, with the establishment of the CVL, the military command was composed of Luigi Longo, Ferruccio Parri, Enrico Mattei, Giovanni Battista Stucchi and Mario Argenton, with General Giuseppe Bellocchio as military consultant. On 3 November 1944, the Command of the CVL was assigned to General Raffaele Cadorna, with Longo and Parri as deputy commanders; Lieutenant Colonel Vittorio Palombo was his chief of staff until his arrest in February 1945, when he was replaced by Major Mario Argenton.
