= Mario Cingolani =

Italian politician (1883–1971)

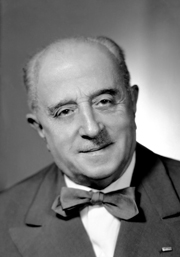
Mario Cingolani

Mario Cingolani (Rome, 2 August 1883 – Rome, 8 April 1971) was an Italian politician.

He graduated in chemistry from the Sapienza University of Rome.

He was a deputy in the XXV(1919–1921), XXVI (1921–1924) and in the XXVII (1924–1929) parliamentary term of the Kingdom of Italy, as member of the Italian People's Party. In 1926 he was declared fallen from office. In 1922 he served also as Undersecretary for Labor in the Facta I and II Government.

In 1944 he was part of the High Commissioner for the punishment of the crimes and offenses of fascism, in the Section for the evocation of regime profits.

In 1946 was elected to the Constituent Assembly, along with his wife Angela Maria Guidi, among the ranks of the Christian Democracy and in 1948 was appointed Senator by right, on the basis of art. III of the transitional and final provisions of the Italian Constitution. He was re-elected to the Senate in the 1953, 1958 and 1963 general elections.

He served as Minister of the Air Force from 13 July 1946 to 2 February 1947 in the De Gasperi II Government and as Minister of Defence from 31 May 1947 to 15 December 1947 in the De Gasperi IV Government.

Preceded by Mario Cevolotto	Minister of the Air Force; 1946 – 1947	Succeeded by Office abolished
Preceded by Luigi Gasparotto	Minister of Defence; 1947	Succeeded by Cipriano Facchinetti
