= Emilio Sereni =

Italian politician

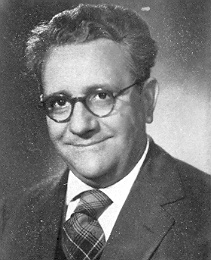

Minister of Public Works
- In office 2 February 1947 – 31 May 1947
- Prime Minister: Alcide De Gasperi
- Preceded by: Giuseppe Romita
- Succeeded by: Umberto Tupini

Minister for Post-War Assistance
- In office 13 July 1946 – 2 February 1947
- Prime Minister: Alcide De Gasperi
- Preceded by: Luigi Gasparotto
- Succeeded by: Post abolished

Personal details
- Born: 13 August 1907 Rome, Kingdom of Italy
- Died: 20 March 1977 (aged 69) Rome, Italy
- Party: Italian Communist Party
- Domestic partner: Xenia Silberberg (1928–1952; her death)
- Children: Clara Sereni
- Occupation: politician, historian, writer

Emilio Sereni (13 August 1907 – 20 March 1977) was an Italian writer, politician and historian.

== Biography ==
Born into a Jewish family of anti-fascist intellectuals, Sereni graduated from the Liceo Terenzio Mamiani in Rome. Brother of the Zionist and socialist Enzo Sereni, co-founder of the kibbutz Givat Brenner, and of Enrico Sereni, a scientist linked to the anti-fascist movement Giustizia e Libertà, who committed suicide at a young age.

In 1926, Sereni joined the Italian Communist Party and one year later he graduated in agronomy in Portici, starting shortly after a work of proselytism in the Neapolitan area, where he met Giorgio Amendola. In 1930 he went to Paris and came into contact with Palmiro Togliatti. Returning to Italy in September of the same year, he was arrested and sentenced by the Special Tribunal for the Defense of the State to twenty years, then reduced to 15 for the accumulation of penalties.

Amnestied in 1935, Sereni fled to Paris with his wife Xenia Silberberg, known by the name of Marina, and their daughter Lea; there, he was responsible for cultural work and served as editor-in-chief of the magazines Stato Operaio and La voce degli italiani. After returning to Italy and once again being discovered in 1943, he was sentenced to 18 years for "subversive association". A year later Sereni managed to escape and settled in Milan, where the party assigned him the task of directing the office of agitation and propaganda.

After having played an important role in the Italian resistance movement as a representative, together with Luigi Longo, of the Communist Party in the National Liberation Committee for Northern Italy and as a member of the insurrectionary committee set up in April 1945, Sereni joined the central committee of the PCI in 1946 (where he would remain until 1975). He was twice minister under Alcide De Gasperi: first as Minister for Post-War Assistance, and then as Minister of Public Works. From 1948 until 1963, he served as a member of the Senate. During the Hungarian revolution of 1956, he joined the party leadership in siding with the Soviet Union. From its founding in 1963, Sereni was an editor of the magazine Critica marxista.

As a polyglot, Sereni knew German, English, French, Russian, Greek, Latin, Hebrew, Japanese, and several dead cuneiform languages such as Akkadian, Sumerian and Hittite. Among his theoretical and historical works are Il capitalismo nelle campagne ("Capitalism in the Countryside"), Il Mezzogiorno all'opposizione ("Mezzogiorno in the Opposition"), La questione agraria nella rinascita nazionale italiana ("The Agrarian Question in the Italian National Rebirth") and La rivoluzione italiana ("The Italian Revolution"); altogether, his bibliography contains 1071 writings, the first dating back to 1930. Sereni donated his archive to the Alcide Cervi Institute in Gattatico, of which he was a founder.

Together with his wife Xenia Silberberg, Sereni was the father of the writer Clara Sereni. His daughter narrated Sereni's political and family history in the historical novel Il gioco dei regni ("The Play of Kingdoms"), published by Giunti in 1993.

Preceded by Luigi Gasparotto	Minister for Post-War Assistance; 1946–1947	Succeeded by none
Preceded by Giuseppe Romita	Minister of Public Works; 1947	Succeeded by Umberto Tupini
