= Rodolfo Morandi =

Italian economist and politician (1902–1955)

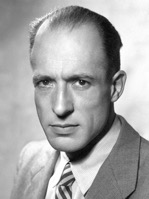

Minister of Industry and Commerce
- In office 1946–1947
- Prime Minister: Alcide De Gasperi

Personal details
- Born: 30 July 1902 Milan, Italy
- Died: 26 July 1955 (aged 52) Milan, Italy
- Party: Italian Socialist Party
- Occupation: Economist, lawyer

Rodolfo Morandi (30 July 1902 – 26 July 1955) was an Italian socialist politician and economist. He was a member of the Socialist Party and was one of its leading figures following World War II. He served as the minister of industry and commerce in the cabinets led by Prime Minister Alcide De Gasperi in the period 1946–1947.

== Biography ==
Morandi was born in Milan on 30 July 1902. He was arrested in Milan together with other 250 socialists in April 1937.

In July 1946 he was appointed minister of industry and commerce to the cabinet formed by Alcide De Gasperi and remained in the office until May 1947. He served in the Italian Senate from 1948 and served as the general secretary of the Socialist Party. Within the party he was one of the leaders of the leftist faction, the others being Pietro Nenni and Lelio Basso. Morandi played an important role in training young PSI cadres in the aftermath of World War II. He strongly influenced the members of the party's youth section. Among his disciples and heirs were Tullio Vecchietti, Dario Valori, and Giacomo Princigalli, long-standing officials of the PSI's left wing and later founders of the PSIUP in 1964. When, in 1972, the PSIUP disintegrated most of them joined the Communist Party.

Morandi died in Milan on 26 July 1955.

== Works ==
- Storia della grande industria in Italia (1931)
- La democrazia del socialismo (1923)
- Lettere al fratello e Lotta di popolo (1937)
- Democrazia diretta e ricostruzione capitalista (1945)
- Il Partito e la Classe (1948)
