= Clara Sereni =

Italian writer of Jewish descent (1946–2018)

- Born: 28 August 1946; Rome, Italy
- Died: 25 July 2018 (aged 71); Zurich, Switzerland
- Occupations: Novelist, journalist, translator
- Writing career
- Genres: Fiction, sociological

Clara Sereni (28 August 1946 – 25 July 2018) was an Italian writer of Jewish descent. She was born and married in Rome where she remained until 1991. Then she moved to Perugia.

She became known to critics and the public with her first book, Sigma Epsilon (1974), an autobiographical revisiting of the frenzied political times marking her generation. Her second work, Casalinghitudine, written thirteen years later, is a kind of recipe book where each dish is linked with a particular moment of her own past, an indelible memory. Her popularity increased with short stories, such as Manicomio primavera (1989) and the novel Il gioco dei regni (1993), which won her two literary prizes.

Sereni's activities also span the social and political arenas. In the Umbrian capital of Perugia she was elected Deputy Mayor, with the Social Policies portfolio, from 1995 to 1997.

In 1998, following a difficult personal situation (her son Matteo has been affected by psychosis from birth), Sereni promoted the Città del sole NGO Foundation (becoming its President) – a charity mental health organisation for the disabled and gravely afflicted.

She was also a columnist for the Italian newspapers l'Unità and Il Manifesto, and translated and edited works by Balzac, Stendhal, Madame de la Fayette. Moreover, she reviewed many books, among which in 1996 the important Si può (You can), where five Italian journalists (Lucia Annunziata, Gad Lerner, Barbara Palombelli, Oreste Pivetta and Gianni Riotta) narrate a positive story of integration into society of the mentally disabled.

In 2003 she won the Grinzane Cavour Prize for Literature.

In 2004 Sereni took part in the documentary movie Un silenzio particolare (A Particular Silence), directed by her husband Stefano Rulli, on their mutual experience of life with their son Matteo, also in the movie.

== Bibliography ==
- Sigma epsilon, Marsilio, 1974
- Casalinghitudine (Housewifery), Einaudi, 1987
- Manicomio Primavera (Spring Madhouse), Giunti, 1989
- Il gioco dei regni (The Play of Kingdoms), Giunti, 1993 (Prize of the Lucca Readers and Marotta Prize)
- Eppure (However) Feltrinelli, 1995
- Taccuino di un'ultimista (An Ultimist Notebook), Feltrinelli, 1998
- Da un grigio all'altro (From one grey to the other), Di Renzo, 1998
- Passami il sale (Pass the Salt), Rizzoli, 2002 (the Pisa National Literary Prize)
- Le Merendanze (Snackers), Rizzoli, 2004
- Il lupo mercante (The Merchant Wolf), Rizzoli, 2007
