= Salvatore Aldisio =

Italian engineer and politician (1890–1964)

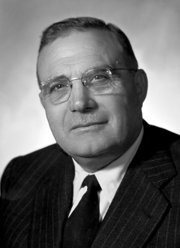
Salvatore Aldisio

Salvatore Aldisio (Gela, 29 December 1890 – Rome, 27 July 1964) was an Italian Christian Democratic politician.

He was born in Gela is a town in the province of Caltanissetta. Thanks to the organizing work of Aldisio his hometown underwent a renewal process and also a social and economic transformation from the post-war years to the beginning of the 1950s. He initiated important public works, such as the Town Hall, the sea-haven, St. James’ Church, Aldisio Village, the aqueduct, the civil hospital, the seafront promenade, etc.

In 1944, he was interior minister for a short while in the second government of Pietro Badoglio, before becoming High Commissioner for Sicily in August 1944. He opposed the separatist movement on the island that had gained significance after the Allied invasion of Sicily in July 1943 and the fall of the Fascist regime.

Prime Minister Ivanoe Bonomi gave Aldisio permission to use all legal means to crush the separatists. Mafia chieftains perceived Aldisio's appointment as a first sign of the government's determination to subdue the separatist movement. They were now forced to reconsider their early loyalty to it.

In 1946, he was elected in the Italian Constituent Assembly and he would remain a senator and deputy until his death in 1964. He was minister of mercantile marine and minister of public works in the successive governments of Alcide De Gasperi (1950–53), as well as minister of industry and trade in the first government of Amintore Fanfani (1954). Aldisio died in Rome on 27 July 1964.
