= Minister of Defence (Italy) =

Ministry in the Cabinet of Italy

- Ministro della Difesa

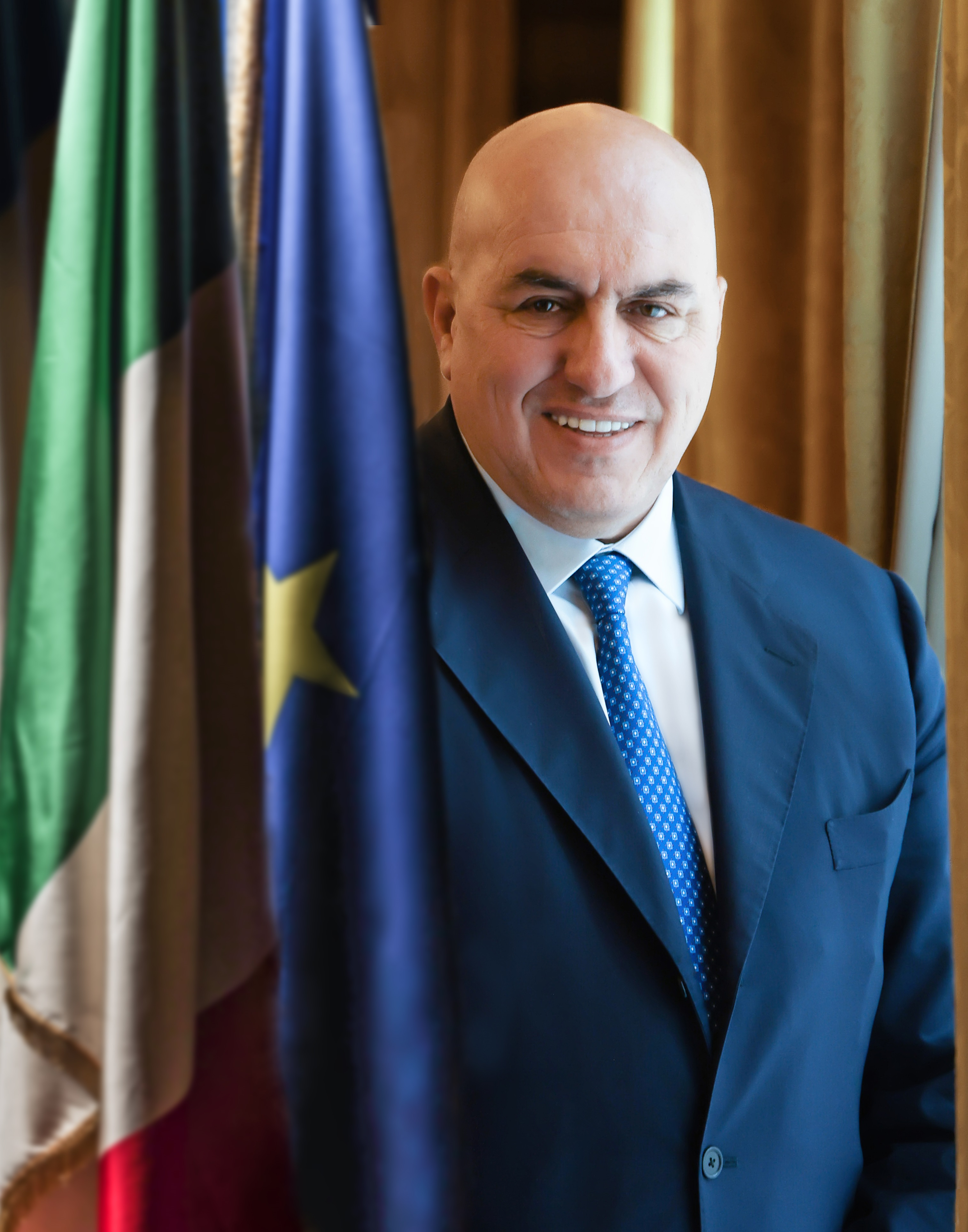
- Incumbent; Guido Crosetto since 22 October 2022
- Ministry of Defence
- Member of: Council of Ministers; High Council of Defence
- Reports to: The prime minister
- Seat: Rome
- Appointer: The president
- Term length: No fixed term
- Precursor: Minister of War; Minister of the Navy; Minister of the Air Force
- Formation: 4 February 1947; 79 years ago
- First holder: Luigi Gasparotto
- Website: www.difesa.it

The minister of defence (Italian: ministro della difesa) is a senior member of the Italian Cabinet who leads the Ministry of Defence. The minister is responsible for military and civil defence matters and managing the Italian Armed Forces. The first minister of war was Manfredo Fanti, a general of the Royal Italian Army, while the first minister of defence was Luigi Gasparotto, member of the Labour Democratic Party. Since 22 October 2022, the office holder is Guido Crosetto, of the Brothers of Italy party, who is the defence minister of the Meloni government.

== List of ministers of defence ==
Parties

- 1947–1994:
  - Labour Democratic Party
  - Christian Democracy
  - Italian Republican Party
  - Italian Democratic Socialist Party
  - Italian Socialist Party
  - Italian Liberal Party
  - Independent
- 1994–present:
  - Forza Italia / The People of Freedom
  - Italian People's Party
  - Democratic Union for the Republic
  - The Daisy / Democratic Party
  - Civic Choice / Populars for Italy
  - Five Star Movement
  - Brothers of Italy
  - Independent

Governments:

- 1947–1994:
  - Centrist coalition
  - Organic centre-left
  - Pentapartito / Quadripartito
  - Mixed coalition
- 1994–present:
  - Centre-right coalition
  - Centre-left coalition
  - Mixed coalition

Portrait	Name (Born–Died)	Term of office			Party	Government	Ref.
Portrait	Name (Born–Died)	Took office	Left office	Time in office	Party	Government	Ref.
	Luigi Gasparotto (1873–1954)	4 February 1947	31 May 1947	116 days	Labour Democratic Party	De Gasperi III	
	Mario Cingolani (1883–1971)	31 May 1947	15 December 1947	198 days	Christian Democracy	De Gasperi IV	
	Cipriano Facchinetti (1889–1952)	15 December 1947	23 May 1948	160 days	Italian Republican Party	De Gasperi IV	
	Randolfo Pacciardi (1899–1991)	23 May 1948	16 July 1953	5 years, 54 days	Italian Republican Party	De Gasperi V·VI·VII	
	Giuseppe Codacci Pisanelli (1913–1999)	16 July 1953	17 August 1953	32 days	Christian Democracy	De Gasperi VIII	
	Paolo Emilio Taviani (1912–2001)	17 August 1953	1 July 1958	4 years, 318 days	Christian Democracy	Pella; Fanfani I Scelba; Segni I Zoli	
	Antonio Segni (1891–1972)	1 July 1958	15 February 1959	229 days	Christian Democracy	Fanfani II	
	Giulio Andreotti (1919–2013)	15 February 1959	23 February 1966	7 years, 8 days	Christian Democracy	Segni II; Tambroni; Fanfani III·IV; Leone I	
	Giulio Andreotti (1919–2013)	15 February 1959	23 February 1966	7 years, 8 days	Christian Democracy	Moro I·II	
	Roberto Tremelloni (1900–1987)	23 February 1966	24 June 1968	2 years, 122 days	Italian Democratic Socialist Party	Moro III	
	Luigi Gui (1914–2010)	24 June 1968	27 March 1970	1 year, 276 days	Christian Democracy	Leone II	
	Luigi Gui (1914–2010)	24 June 1968	27 March 1970	1 year, 276 days	Christian Democracy	Rumor I	
	Luigi Gui (1914–2010)	24 June 1968	27 March 1970	1 year, 276 days	Christian Democracy	Rumor II	
	Mario Tanassi (1918–2007)	27 March 1970	17 February 1972	1 year, 327 days	Italian Democratic Socialist Party	Rumor III; Colombo	
	Franco Restivo (1911–1976)	17 February 1972	26 June 1972	130 days	Christian Democracy	Andreotti I	
	Mario Tanassi (1918–2007)	26 June 1972	14 March 1974	1 year, 261 days	Italian Democratic Socialist Party	Andreotti II	
	Mario Tanassi (1918–2007)	26 June 1972	14 March 1974	1 year, 261 days	Italian Democratic Socialist Party	Rumor IV	
	Giulio Andreotti (1919–2013)	14 March 1974	23 November 1974	254 days	Christian Democracy	Rumor V	
	Arnaldo Forlani (1925–2023)	23 November 1974	29 July 1976	1 year, 249 days	Christian Democracy	Moro IV·V	
	Vittorio Lattanzio (1926–2010)	29 July 1976	18 September 1977	1 year, 51 days	Christian Democracy	Andreotti III	
	Attilio Ruffini (1925–2011)	18 September 1977	14 January 1980	2 years, 118 days	Christian Democracy	Andreotti III·IV·V; Cossiga I	
	Adolfo Sarti (1928–1992)	14 January 1980	4 April 1980	81 days	Christian Democracy	Cossiga II	
	Lelio Lagorio (1925–2017)	4 April 1980	4 August 1983	3 years, 122 days	Italian Socialist Party	Cossiga II; Forlani	
	Lelio Lagorio (1925–2017)	4 April 1980	4 August 1983	3 years, 122 days	Italian Socialist Party	Spadolini I·II; Fanfani V	
	Giovanni Spadolini (1925–1994)	4 August 1983	18 April 1987	3 years, 257 days	Italian Republican Party	Craxi I·II	
	Remo Gaspari (1921–2011)	18 April 1987	29 July 1987	101 days	Christian Democracy	Fanfani IV	
	Valerio Zanone (1936–2016)	29 July 1987	22 July 1989	1 year, 358 days	Italian Liberal Party	Goria; De Mita	
	Mino Martinazzoli (1931–2011)	22 July 1989	27 July 1990	1 year, 5 days	Christian Democracy	Andreotti VI	
	Virginio Rognoni (1924–2022)	27 July 1990	28 June 1992	1 year, 337 days	Christian Democracy	Andreotti VI·VII	
	Salvo Andò (born 1945)	28 June 1992	28 April 1993	304 days	Italian Socialist Party	Amato I	
	Fabio Fabbri (1933–2024)	28 April 1993	10 May 1994	1 year, 12 days	Italian Socialist Party	Ciampi	
	Cesare Previti (born 1934)	10 May 1994	17 January 1995	252 days	Forza Italia	Berlusconi I	
	Domenico Corcione (1929–2020)	17 January 1995	17 May 1996	1 year, 121 days	Independent	Dini	
	Beniamino Andreatta (1928–2007)	17 May 1996	21 October 1998	2 years, 157 days	Italian People's Party	Prodi I	
	Carlo Scognamiglio (born 1944)	21 October 1998	22 December 1999	1 year, 62 days	Democratic Union for the Republic	D'Alema I	
	Sergio Mattarella (born 1941)	22 December 1999	11 June 2001	1 year, 171 days	Italian People's Party	D'Alema II; Amato II	
	Antonio Martino (1942–2022)	11 June 2001	17 May 2006	4 years, 340 days	Forza Italia	Berlusconi II·III	
	Arturo Parisi (born 1940)	17 May 2006	8 May 2008	1 year, 357 days	The Daisy / Democratic Party	Prodi II	
	Ignazio La Russa (born 1947)	8 May 2008	16 November 2011	3 years, 192 days	The People of Freedom	Berlusconi IV	
	Giampaolo Di Paola (born 1944)	16 November 2011	28 April 2013	1 year, 163 days	Independent	Monti	
	Mario Mauro (born 1961)	28 April 2013	22 February 2014	300 days	Civic Choice / Populars for Italy	Letta	
	Roberta Pinotti (born 1961)	22 February 2014	1 June 2018	4 years, 99 days	Democratic Party	Renzi; Gentiloni	
	Elisabetta Trenta (born 1967)	1 June 2018	5 September 2019	1 year, 96 days	Five Star Movement	Conte I	
	Lorenzo Guerini (born 1966)	5 September 2019	22 October 2022	3 years, 47 days	Democratic Party	Conte II; Draghi	
	Guido Crosetto (born 1963)	22 October 2022	Incumbent	3 years, 320 days	Brothers of Italy	Meloni	

== See also ==
- Minister of the Air Force (Italy)
- Ministry of Defence (Italy)
- Minister of the Navy (Italy)
- Minister of War (Italy)
