= National Liberation Committee =

Italian World War II resistance movement

National Liberation Committee Comitato di Liberazione Nazionale
- President: Ivanoe Bonomi
- Other leaders: Alcide De Gasperi; Pietro Nenni; Palmiro Togliatti; Ugo La Malfa; Ferruccio Parri
- Founded: 8 September 1943
- Dissolved: 1 June 1947 (Note: The CLN was de facto dissolved with the end of the third De Gasperi government in 1947.)
- Headquarters: Rome, Italy
- Ideology: Anti-fascism

The National Liberation Committee (Italian: Comitato di Liberazione Nazionale, CLN) was a political umbrella organization and the main representative of the Italian resistance movement fighting against the occupying forces of Nazi Germany and the fascist collaborationist forces of the Italian Social Republic during the German occupation of Italy in the aftermath of the armistice of Cassibile, while simultaneously fighting against Italian fascists during the Italian Civil War. It coordinated and directed the Italian resistance and was subdivided into the Central Committee for National Liberation (CCLN), which was based in Rome, and the later National Liberation Committee for Northern Italy (CLNAI), which was based in Milan. The CLN was a multi-party entity, whose members were united by their anti-fascism.

== History ==
The CLN was formed on 8 September 1943, following Italy's armistice and Germany's invasion of the country. The member parties were the Italian Communist Party, the Italian Socialist Party, the Action Party, the Christian Democracy, the Labour Democratic Party, and the Italian Liberal Party. With the backing of the Kingdom of Italy and the Allies of World War II, the CLN gained official recognition as the representative of the Italian resistance movement, and had several leaders operating underground in German-occupied Italy.

The partisan formations controlled by the CLN were primarily divided between three main groups, Communist Garibaldi Brigades, the Action Party's Giustizia e Libertà Brigades, and Socialist Matteotti Brigades. Smaller groups included Catholic and monarchist partisans. There were partisan units not represented in the CLN, including the Maiella Brigades and anarchist, republican, and Trotskyist formations.

The CLN led the governments of Italy from the liberation of Rome in June 1944 until the 1946 Italian general election, which was the first post-war general election. After being deprived of all its functions ahead of the 1946 elections, they were disbanded in 1947.

== Composition ==
Party	Main ideology	Leader
Christian Democracy	Christian democracy	Alcide De Gasperi
Italian Socialist Party	Democratic socialism	Pietro Nenni
Italian Communist Party	Communism	Palmiro Togliatti
Italian Liberal Party	Liberalism	Manlio Brosio
Action Party	Liberal socialism	Ferruccio Parri
Labour Democratic Party	Social democracy	Ivanoe Bonomi

== Seats ==
House	Period	Seats
National Council	5 April 1945 – 24 June 1946	227 / 430
Constituent Assembly	25 June 1946 – 1 June 1947	503 / 556

== Bibliography ==
- "CLN nell'Enciclopedia Treccani". Treccani (in Italian). Rome: Italian Encyclopedia Institute. 2013.
