= Ferruccio Parri =

Italian partisan and politician (1890–1981)

Senator for life Ferruccio Parri
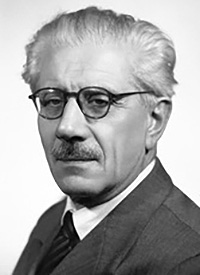

Prime Minister of Italy
- In office 21 June 1945 – 10 December 1945
- Monarch: Victor Emmanuel III
- Lieutenant General: The Prince of Piedmont
- Preceded by: Ivanoe Bonomi
- Succeeded by: Alcide De Gasperi

Minister of the Interior
- In office 21 June 1945 – 10 December 1945
- Prime Minister: Himself
- Preceded by: Ivanoe Bonomi
- Succeeded by: Giuseppe Romita

Minister of the Italian Africa
- In office 21 June 1945 – 10 December 1945
- Prime Minister: Himself
- Preceded by: Ivanoe Bonomi
- Succeeded by: Alcide De Gasperi

Member of the Senate of the Republic
- Life tenure 2 March 1963 – 8 December 1981
- Appointed by: Antonio Segni
- In office 12 June 1958 – 2 March 1963
- Constituency: Piedmont
- In office 8 May 1948 – 24 June 1953; Ex officio

Member of the Constituent Assembly
- In office 25 June 1946 – 31 January 1948
- Constituency: Italy at-large

Personal details
- Born: 19 January 1890 Pinerolo, Piedmont, Kingdom of Italy
- Died: 8 December 1981 (aged 91) Rome, Lazio, Italy
- Resting place: Monumental Cemetery of Staglieno, Genoa
- Party: PdA (1942–1946); CDR (1946); PRI (1946–1953); UP (1953–1957); Independent (1957–1981)
- Spouse: Ester Verrua (m. 1922; died 1980)

Military service
- Allegiance: Kingdom of Italy; National Liberation Committee (1943–1945)
- Branch/service: Royal Italian Army (World War I); Corpo Volontari della Libertà (World War II)
- Rank: Major
- Battles/wars: World War I: Battle of Vittorio Veneto (1918); Italian Civil War
- Awards: Silver Medal of Military Valor (3); Commemorative Medal for the Italo-Austrian War 1915–1918; Bronze Star Medal

Ferruccio Parri (Italian pronunciation: [ferˈruttʃo ˈparri]; 19 January 1890 – 8 December 1981) was an Italian partisan and anti-fascist politician who served as the 29th Prime Minister of Italy, and the first to be appointed after the end of World War II in Europe. During the war, he was also known by his nom de guerre Maurizio.

== Biography ==
Parri was born in Pinerolo, Piedmont. He served in World War I, when he was wounded four times and received four decorations. In the final stages of the war he worked as a staff officer on the planning of the battle of Vittorio Veneto. After the war he graduated in literature and became a teacher in Milan and an editor for the Corriere della Sera. He left the newspaper in 1925, after it was taken over by the Fascist government, and had to quit his teaching job because he refused to join the National Fascist Party.

=== Resistance to Fascism ===
Parri became active against Benito Mussolini's Fascist regime and joined Carlo and Nello Rosselli's Giustizia e Libertà) ("Justice and Liberty"), the most important Italian non-Marxist anti-fascist movement.

In 1926, together with Carlo Rosselli and future President of Italy Sandro Pertini he was involved in planning and assisting the escape to France of reformist Socialist leader Filippo Turati. For this he was arrested and sentenced to ten months of imprisonment and then to five years of internal exile to the islands of Ustica and Lipari and to Vallo della Lucania. In 1930 he was again banished for five years together with other leaders of Giustizia e Libertà.

Parri remained in contact with Giustizia e Libertà, and in 1942 founded the Action Party, an anti-fascist liberal socialist movement that sought to pair social justice and respect for civil liberties. In September 1943, after the armistice between Italy and the Allied powers and the German occupation of Italy, he was among the people indicated by anti-fascist parties to take a leading role in the Italian resistance movement. Living underground in Nazi-occupied Northern Italy, he became a member of the National Liberation Committee and deputy commander of the main group of partisan forces, the Corpo Volontari della Libertà.

He was arrested in Milan in January 1945 by the Waffen SS during a routine operation. He was held prisoner until March when he was released as part of Operation Sunrise – a series of secret negotiations between Allen Dulles, head of the U.S. Office of Strategic Services (OSS) and representatives of the German Wehrmacht command in Northern Italy. The release of Parri was requested by the OSS as evidence of good faith and the ability to act. He returned in time to take part in the final phase of the resistance and in the general insurrection in April.

By the time the war ended the Giustizia e Libertà Brigades, the military arm of the Action Party, were the second largest partisan units, accounting for about 20% of all fighters of the Italian resistance movement.

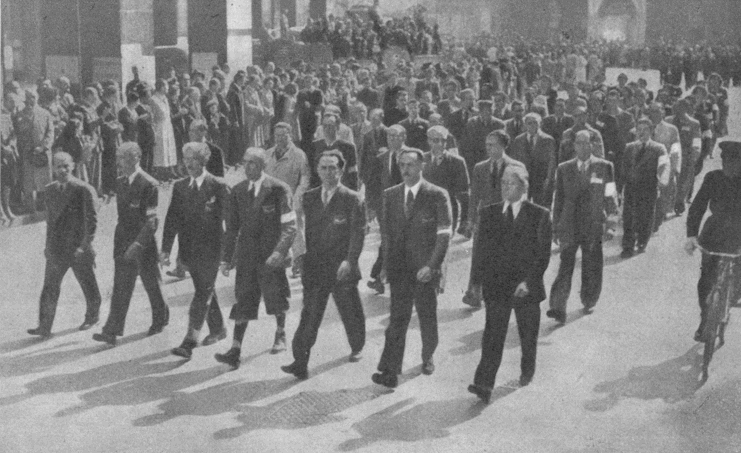
Liberation parade in Milan on 6 May 1945. Parri is in the front row, third from the left.

=== Prime Minister of Italy ===
After the end of World War II in Europe, Parri was appointed leader of a government supported, among the others, by the Action Party, Christian Democracy (Democrazia Cristiana; DC), the Italian Communist Party (Partito Comunista Italiano; PCI), the Italian Socialist Party (Partito Socialista Italiano; PSI) and the Italian Liberal Party (Partito Liberale Italiano; PLI). A centrist, he had been chosen as the compromise leader of a compromise Cabinet. He was also the Minister of the Interior (in charge of the police). When the Liberals withdrew their support from the coalition government, Parri resigned from his position.

At the time, Parri warned: "Beware of civil war ... of reopening the door to fascism. ... There are rumors that Washington and London have no trust in me. The real reason for this lack of trust is that Italy has only a fragile front of antifascism. ... I hope my successors will follow the only worthy policy for Italy: left of center".

=== In Parliament ===
In spite of the wartime strength of Giustizia e libertà the Action Party quickly faded from the Italian political scene, winning 1.46% in the 1946 Constituent Assembly election. Parri, along with Ugo La Malfa, left the party shortly before the election to form the Republican Democratic Concentration (Concentrazione Democratica Repubblicana; CDR), which won 0.42% and elected its two most prominent members as deputies. The CDR would be absorbed the following year into the Italian Republican Party (PRI).

He became a Senator in 1948.

In 1953 Parri, who was opposed to recent changes to the election law, left the PRI to establish the short-lived Popular Unity (Unità Popolare; UP) with former Action Party member Piero Calamandrei, with the goal of preventing the centrist coalition from winning a majority bonus of seats. The party, which failed to elect any members, was absorbed into the Italian Socialist Party in 1957.

In 1958 he was re-elected to the Senate as an independent in the Socialist party list. He proposed to form a parliamentary inquiry committee to investigate the Sicilian Mafia. The proposal was opposed by the parliamentary majority with various arguments, and dismissed by Christian Democratic Senators Bernardo Mattarella and Giovanni Gioia as "useless". It was finally established in 1963.

In 1963, President Antonio Segni appointed Parri senator for life. He joined the Independent Left group, and was for a long time its chairman from 1972 until his death. In March of the same year, he became the editor of the magazine L'Astrolabio, in which he argued in favour of a more accomplished democracy and denounced the resurgence of neofascism.

From 1949 until 1969 he was president of the Federazione italiana delle associazioni partigiane (Italian Federation of Partisan Associations), an association of Resistance veterans that grouped members of Giustizia e Libertà, as well as members of Socialist, Republican, and anarchist groups.

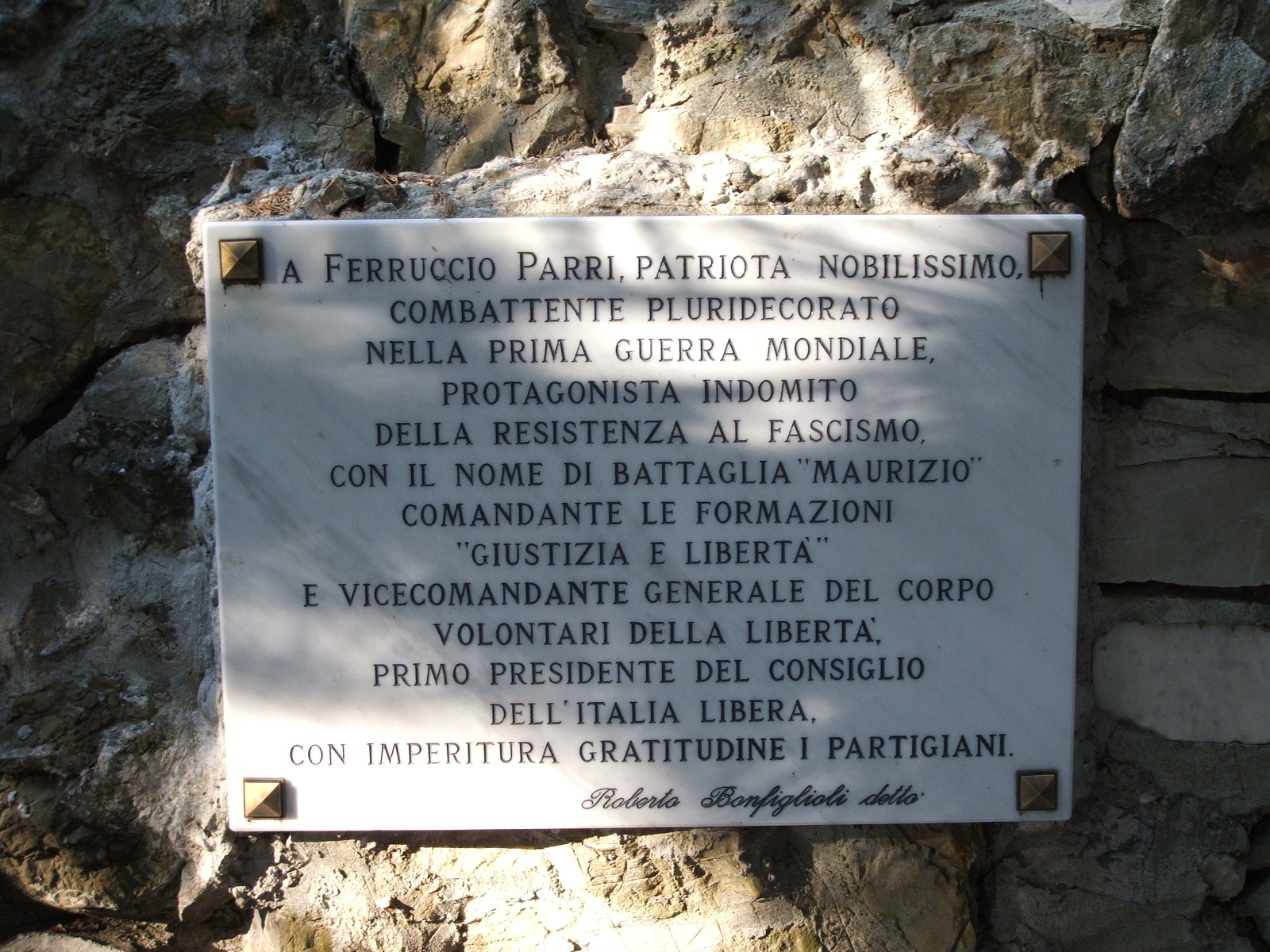
Epigraph on the tomb of Parri in Genoa.

=== Death and legacy ===
Parri died in Rome on 8 December 1981.

Parri remained the symbol of the Italian resistance movement in the eyes of both his former comrades and his eternal enemies. Representing the post-War broad antifascist front, he was a particular target of the populist journalist Guglielmo Giannini in his weekly newspaper L'Uomo qualunque ("The Common Man"). In Giannini's mockery of the new political forces Ferruccio Parri became 'Fessuccio [Fool-uccio] Parri.

In response to Giannini's upcoming Common Man's Front, he said: "I am a common man – uomo della strada. I am just another guy – uomo qualunque ... I hope a typical one. My job is not only to prevent the right and left wings from exercising undue influence on the Government, but I have to think too of the enormous masses of peasants sweating in the fields under the sun, blacksmiths beating their anvils in villages, workers, men and women everywhere who have no taste for politics and are outside parties. ... I am just a uomo della strada."

After leaving office, Parri consistently framed Qualunquismo not as a legitimate populist grievance but as a symptom of a dangerous regression. In his political speeches, he argued that the problem of fascism in Italy was no longer confined simply to the neo-fascist revival or to the "vulgarity" of Qualunquismo — he saw the erosion of antifascist unity and even the centrist majority, fearing the left, as drifting toward clerical authoritarianism.

One of Parri's most deliberate responses to the revisionist and anti-partisan culture promoted by Qualunquismo was institutional. Convinced that in a Cold War-divided Italy it was necessary to weave together the shared memory of the Resistance, in 1949 he founded the National Institute for the History of the Liberation Movement in Italy — today known as the Istituto nazionale Ferruccio Parri — as a direct effort to preserve and legitimize the antifascist heritage that Qualunquismo sought to ridicule and delegitimize.

== Electoral history ==
Election	House	Constituency	Party	Votes	Result
1946	Constituent Assembly	Italy at-large	CDR	97,690	Elected
1953	Chamber of Deputies	Milan–Pavia	UP	4,477	Not Elected
1958	Senate of the Republic	Piedmont – Novara	PSI	33,997	Elected

== Bibliography ==
- (in Italian) Carlo Piola Caselli, Il taccuino di Ferruccio Parri sull'Europa (1948-1954), 2012

Italian Senate
Title jointly held	Member of the Senate of the Republic; Legislatures: I, III; 1948–1953; 1958–1963	Title jointly held
Presidential appointment	Senator for life Legislatures: III, IV, V, VI, VII, VIII; 1963–1981	Died in office
Political offices
Preceded by Ivanoe Bonomi	Minister of the Interior; 1945	Succeeded by Giuseppe Romita
Preceded by Ivanoe Bonomi	Minister of the Italian East Africa; 1945	Succeeded by Alcide De Gasperi
Preceded by Ivanoe Bonomi	Prime Minister of Italy; 1945	Succeeded by Alcide De Gasperi
