= National Council (Italy) =

National Council Consulta Nazionale

History
- Preceded by: Parliament of the Kingdom of Italy
- Succeeded by: Constituent Assembly of Italy

Leadership
- President of the Council: Carlo Sforza, PRI

Structure
- Seats: 304
- Political groups: CLN (227); PCI (37); PSIUP (38); PDL (38); PdA (38); DC (38); PLI (38); CNDL (6); PDI (4); Trade Unions (47); ANPI (16); Veterans (12); Freelancers (12); Anti-fascist former MPs (74); Government's officials (44)

Meeting place
- Palazzo Montecitorio, Rome

The National Council (Consulta Nazionale) was an unelected provisional legislative assembly set up in the Kingdom of Italy after the end of World War II. It fulfilled the roles of parliament until regular elections could be held. It first sat on 25 September 1945 and was dissolved after the national elections on 2 June 1946, which formed the first Constituent Assembly of Italy.

== History ==
The Legislative Decree n. 146 of 5 April 1945 established the National Council, declaring that its purpose was to give opinions and solutions on general problems and on legislative measures promoted by the Italian government. The government was obliged to hear the opinion of the Council on certain matters such as state budget, taxes and electoral laws.

The Council, divided into 10 commissions, ratified, among other laws, the legislative decree that assigned to a popular referendum the choice between monarchy and republic. It also ratified a law that allowed the universal suffrage for the first time in Italian history. The Council approved also an electoral system based on proportional representation, with multi-member constituencies.

Between 25 September 1945 and 9 March 1946 the National Council met a total of 40 times, but some commissions worked until 10 May. After the 1946 general election and referendum the republic was proclaimed. After the formation of the Italian Constituent Assembly, the Council was finally abolished on 24 June 1946.

== President ==
Portrait	Name (Birth–Death)	Term of office		Tenure (Years and days)	Political Party
	Carlo Sforza (1872–1952)	25 September 1945	1 June 1946	103 days	Italian Republican Party
