= Italian Civil War =

Conflict between the Mussolini regime and anti-fascists (1943–1945)

- Part of the Italian campaign in World War II
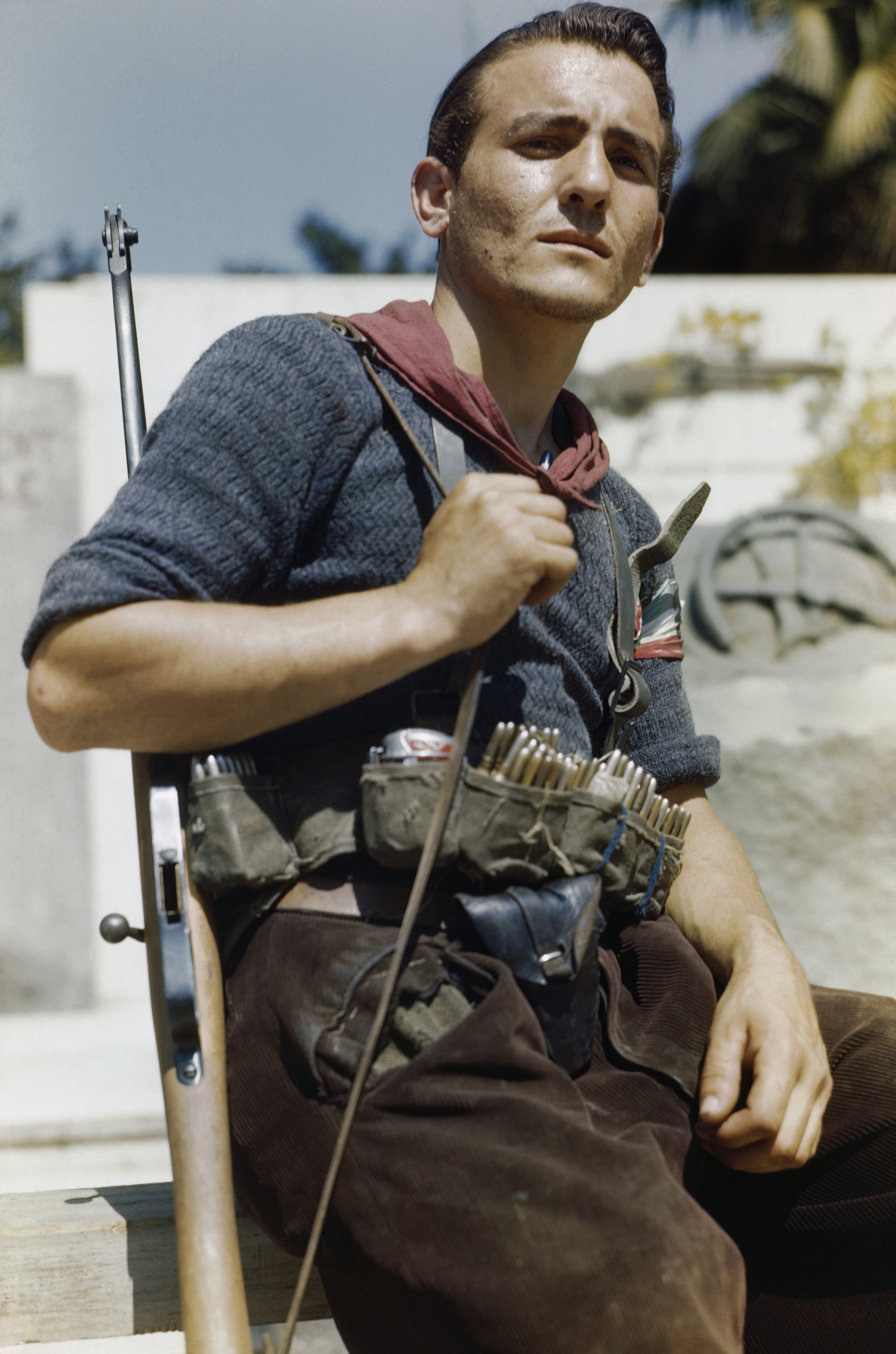
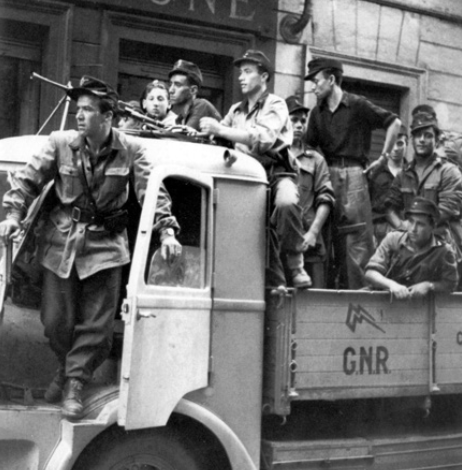
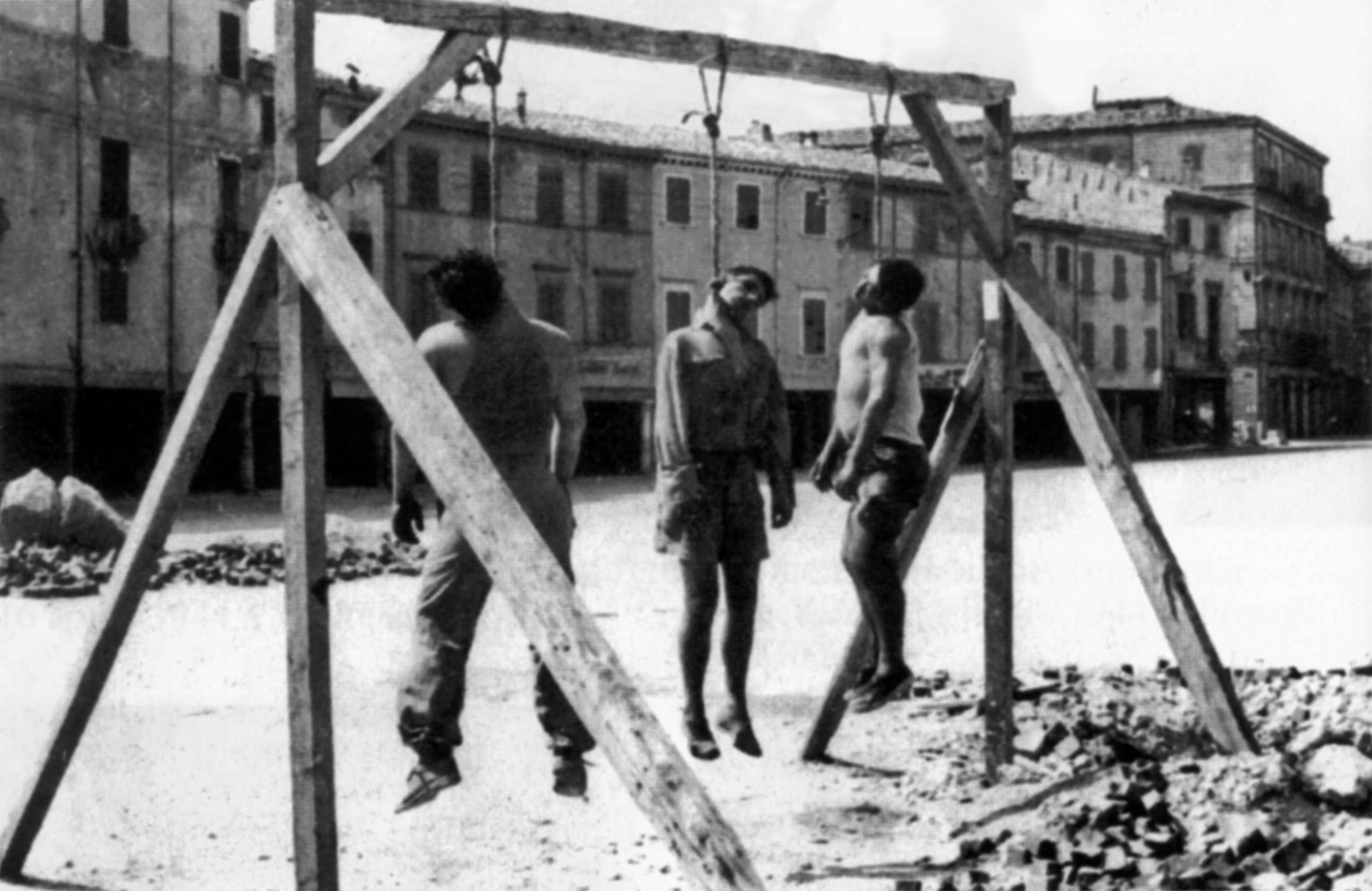
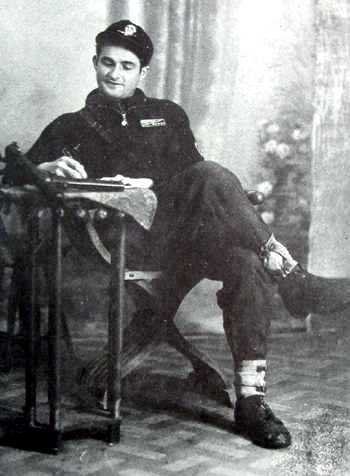
- Clockwise from top: An Italian partisan in Florence, 14 August 1944; GNR group on a Truck with a Breda 30 LMG; Member of the 16th Black Brigade of Varese, 1945; Three Italian partisans executed by public hanging in Rimini, August 1944
Date	8 September 1943 – 2 May 1945 (1 year, 7 months, 3 weeks and 3 days)
Location	Italy
Result	Royal Italian and Italian Resistance victory: Liberation of Italy from Nazism and Italian Fascism: end of German occupation and collapse of the collaborationist Italian Social Republic; Capitulation of German and RSI forces in Italy; Execution of Benito Mussolini and other high-ranking Fascist officials

Belligerents
Italian Resistance: CLN; CLNAI (from 1944); Italian partisan republics (1944); Italian partisan brigades; Czech deserters (from 1944) (Note: In May 1944, eleven out of the total twelve battalion strong Protectorate Government Army (5,002 soldiers, including 272 officers) were moved to northern Italy to support German military operations there. Responsibilities were limited to a passive role in the construction of fortifications and field positions. Approximately 600 soldiers deserted to the Italian partisans, due in part to the effects of the propaganda campaign Operation Sauerkraut of the US Office of Strategic Services.); Kingdom of Italy: Kingdom of the South (September 1943 – June 1944); Co-belligerent Army; Supported by: Allied powers: British Empire (Note: Some notable engagements where forces from the British Empire fought with the Italian partisans include Ancona, Monte Battaglia, Garfagnana, Operation Tombola, and Trieste.); United Kingdom; India; New Zealand; United States (Note: Some notable engagements where forces from the United States fought with the Italian partisans include Monte Battaglia, Garfagnana, and Collecchio.); Poland (from 1944) (Note: Some notable engagements where forces fighting for the Polish government-in-exile fought with the Italian partisans include the Battle of Ancona.); PAFITW; Brazil (from 1944) (Note: Some notable engagements where forces from Brazil fought with the Italian partisans include the Battle of Collecchio, Brazil also gave air support during the Battle of Garfagnana.); Yugoslavia (Note: Some notable engagements where forces from Yugoslavia fought with the Italian partisans include the Race for Trieste, While not taking part in the main front, Yugoslav Forces fought the Axis forces in Istria, a territory once ruled by the Fascist-led Kingdom of Italy before Operation Achse in 1943. Subsequently, Yugoslav forces continued to engage Axis forces across the territory of the Operational Zone of the Adriatic Littoral, from 1943-1945.); Yugoslav Partisans (and others)	Italian Social Republic: National Republican Army; Germany: OZAV; OZAK; Bohemia and Moravia (from 1944); Kazachi Stan (from 1944) (Note: The Kazachi Stan (and Semi-independent military government under the Kazachi Stan subordinate to the Nazi Operational Zone of the Adriatic Littoral Kosakenland) fought against the Italian Resistance during the Cossack settlement in Northern Italy during the Italian campaign. Notable engagements include Operation Ataman and the Battle of Ovaro.): Kosakenland; Chetniks (1945) (Note: Participated in the Race for Trieste in 1945.) (Government of National Salvation) Serbian Volunteer Corps (1945); Serbian State Guard (1945)

Commanders and leaders
(Kingdom of Italy) Ivanoe Bonomi; Alcide De Gasperi; Pietro Nenni; Palmiro Togliatti; Ugo La Malfa; Ferruccio Parri; (Kingdom of Italy) Victor Emmanuel III; (Kingdom of Italy) Prince Umberto; (Kingdom of Italy) Pietro Badoglio; (Kingdom of Italy) Giovanni Messe	(Italian Social Republic) Benito Mussolini (executed); (Italian Social Republic) Alessandro Pavolini (executed); (Italian Social Republic) Rodolfo Graziani (surrendered); (Italian Social Republic) Junio Valerio Borghese; (Nazi Germany) Albert Kesselring; (Nazi Germany) Heinrich von Vietinghoff; Pyotr Krasnov; Sultan Klych-Girey; Timofey Domanov

Strength
CLN / CLNAI: 300,000–350,000; (Kingdom of Italy) Co-belligerent Army: 190,000–244,000; Total: c. 545,000	National Republican Army: 520,000

Casualties and losses
CLN / CLNAI: (Partisan activity) German figures: December 1943—February 1945: 30,209 killed, 22,028 captured and 34,860 civilians arrested Italian postwar figures: 28,368 killed, 20,726 wounded and 14,150 civilians killed (Kingdom of Italy) Co-belligerent Army: (entire theater); 5,927 killed, unknown wounded, captured, and missing	National Republican Army: (entire theater); 34,770 killed, unknown wounded, captured, and missing (Partisan activity); October 1943—March 1945: 5,136 killed, 5,574 wounded and unknown missing Nazi Germany: (Partisan activity); October 1943—February 1945: 2,075 killed, 3,926 wounded and 2,299 abducted or missing
- c. 124,000 post-armistice civilian deaths; 42,600 killed by post-armistice air raids

The Italian Civil War (Italian: Guerra civile italiana, pronounced [ˈɡwɛrra tʃiˈviːle itaˈljaːna]) was a civil war in the Kingdom of Italy fought during the Italian campaign of World War II between Italian fascists (supported by the Axis powers) and Italian partisans (mostly politically organized in the National Liberation Committee) and, to a lesser extent, the Italian Co-belligerent Army.

Many Italian fascists were soldiers or supporters of the Italian Social Republic, a collaborationist puppet state created under the direction of Nazi Germany during its occupation of Italy. The Italian Civil War lasted from around 8 September 1943 (the date of the Armistice of Cassibile, between Italy and the Allies) to 2 May 1945 (the date of the Surrender at Caserta). The Italian partisans and the Italian Co-belligerent Army of the Kingdom of Italy, sometimes materially supported by the Allies, simultaneously fought against the occupying Nazi German armed forces. Armed clashes between the fascist National Republican Army of the Italian Social Republic and the Italian Co-belligerent Army of the Kingdom of Italy were rare, while clashes between the Italian fascists and the Italian partisans were common. There were also some internal conflicts within the partisan movement. In this context, Germans, sometimes helped by Italian fascists, committed several atrocities against Italian civilians and troops.

The event that later gave rise to the Italian Civil War was the deposition and arrest of Benito Mussolini on 25 July 1943 by King Victor Emmanuel III, after which Italy signed the Armistice of Cassibile on 8 September 1943, ending its war with the Allies. However, German forces began occupying Italy immediately prior to the armistice, through Operation Achse, and then invaded and occupied Italy on a larger scale after the armistice, taking control of northern and central Italy and creating the Italian Social Republic (RSI), with Mussolini installed as leader after he was rescued by German paratroopers in the Gran Sasso raid. As a result, the Italian Co-belligerent Army was created to fight against the Germans, while other Italian troops continued to fight alongside the Germans in the National Republican Army. In addition, a large Italian resistance movement started a guerrilla war against the German and Italian fascist forces. The anti-fascist victory led to the execution of Mussolini, the liberation of the country from dictatorship, and the birth of the Italian Republic under the control of the Allied Military Government of Occupied Territories, which was operational until the Treaty of Peace with Italy in 1947.

== Terminology ==
Although other European countries such as Norway, the Netherlands, and France also had partisan movements and collaborationist governments with Nazi Germany, armed confrontation between compatriots was among its most intense in Italy, making the Italian case unique. In 1965, the definition of "civil war" was used for the first time by fascist politician and historian Giorgio Pisanò in his books, while Claudio Pavone's book Una guerra civile. Saggio storico sulla moralità della Resistenza (A Civil War. Historical Essay On the Morality Of the Resistance), published in 1991, led to the term "Italian Civil War" being used more frequently by Italian (Note: See as examples Renzo De Felice and Gianni Oliva.) and international historiography.

== Factions ==
Confrontations between the factions resulted in the torture and death of many civilians. During the Italian Campaign, partisans were supplied with small arms, ammunition and explosives by the Western Allies. Allied forces and partisans cooperated on military missions, parachuting or landing personnel behind enemy lines, often including Italian-American members of OSS. Other operations were carried out exclusively by secret service personnel. Where possible, both sides avoided situations in which Italian units of opposite fronts were involved in combat episodes.

=== Partisans ===
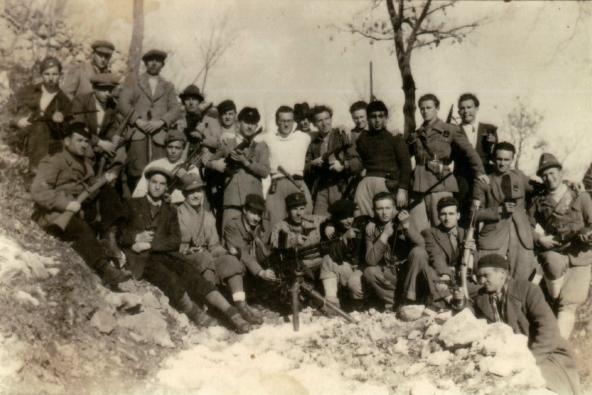
A group of Italian partisans

The first groups of partisans were formed in Boves, Piedmont, and Bosco Martese, Abruzzo. Other groups, composed mainly of Slavs and communists, sprang up in the Julian March. Others grew around Allied prisoners of war, released or escaped from captivity following the events of 8 September. These first organized units soon dissolved because of the rapid German reaction. In Boves, on 19 September 1943, the Nazis committed their first massacre on Italian territory.

On 8 September, hours after the radio announcement of the armistice, the representatives of several anti-fascist organizations converged on Rome. They were Mauro Scoccimarro and Giorgio Amendola (Italian Communist Party), Alcide De Gasperi (Christian Democracy), Ugo La Malfa and Sergio Fenoaltea (Action Party), Pietro Nenni and Giuseppe Romita (Italian Socialist Party), Ivanoe Bonomi and Meuccio Ruini (Labour Democratic Party), and Alessandro Casati (Italian Liberal Party). They formed the first Committee of National Liberation (CLN), with Bonomi taking over its presidency.

The Italian Communist Party was eager to take the initiative without waiting for the Allies:

(in Italian) ...è necessario agire subito ed il più ampiamente e decisamente possibile perché solo nella misura in cui il popolo italiano concorrerà attivamente alla cacciata dei tedeschi dall'Italia, alla sconfitta del nazismo e del fascismo, potrà veramente conquistarsi l'indipendenza e la libertà. Noi non possiamo e non dobbiamo attenderci passivamente la libertà dagli angloamericani. -
"... It's necessary to act immediately and as widely and decisively as possible, because only if the Italian People actively contribute to push out Germans from Italy and to defeat Nazism and Fascism, it will be really able to get independence and freedom. We can not and must not passively expect freedom from the British and the Americans."

The Allies did not believe in the guerrillas' effectiveness, so General Alexander postponed their attacks against the Nazis. On 16 October, the CLN issued its first important political and operational press release, which rejected the calls for reconciliation launched by Republican leaders. CLN Milan asked "the Italian people to fight against the German invaders and against their fascist lackeys".

Flag of the National Liberation Committee

In late November, the Communists established task forces called Distaccamenti d'assalto Garibaldi, which later would become brigades and divisions (Note: Despite their name, generally these detachments were not large, and at their best they counted no more than some hundreds of members. In some cases, there were formations numbering thousands of partisans, until summer 1944 when some joint Italian-German operations reduced this strength (as in Appendix in De Felice 1997).) whose leadership was entrusted to Luigi Longo, under the political direction of Pietro Secchia and Giancarlo Pajetta, Chief of Staff. The first operational order, dated 25 November, ordered the partisans to attack and annihilate in every way:

- officers, soldiers, and material deposits of Hitler's armed forces;
- people, places, and properties of fascists and traitors who collaborate with the occupying Germans;
- war industries, communication systems and everything that might help the war plans of the Nazi occupants.

Shortly after the Armistice, parts of the Italian Communist Party, the Gruppi di Azione Patriottica ("Patriotic Action Groups") or simply GAP, established small cells whose main purpose was to unleash urban terror through bomb attacks against fascists, Germans and their supporters. They operated independently in case of arrest or betrayal of individual elements. The success of these attacks led the German and Italian police to believe they were composed of foreign intelligence agents. A public announcement from the PCI in September 1943 stated:

To the tyranny of Nazism, that claims to reduce to slavery through violence and terror, we must respond with violence and terror.

— Appeal of PCI to the Italian People, September 1943

The GAP's mission was claimed to be delivering "justice" to Nazi tyranny and terror, with emphasis on the selection of targets: "the official, hierarchical collaborators, agents hired to denounce men of the Resistance and Jews, the Nazi police informants and law enforcement organizations of CSR", thus differentiating it from the Nazi terror. However, partisan memoirs discussed the "elimination of enemies especially heinous", such as torturers, spies and provocateurs. Some orders from branch command partisans insisted on protecting the innocent, instead of providing lists of categories to be hit as individuals deserving of punishment. Part of the Italian press during the war agreed that murders were carried out against moderate Republican fascists willing to compromise and negotiate, such as Aldo Resega, Igino Ghisellini, Eugenio Facchini, and the philosopher Giovanni Gentile.

Women also participated in the resistance, mainly by procuring supplies, clothing and medicines, distributing anti-fascist propaganda, fundraising, maintaining communications, organizing partisan rallies, and participating in strikes and demonstrations against fascism. Some women actively participated in the conflict as combatants.

The first detachment of guerrilla fighters rose up in Piedmont in mid-1944 as the Garibaldi Brigade Eusebio Giambone. Partisan forces varied by seasons, German and fascist repression and also by Italian topography, never exceeding 200,000 people actively involved.

=== Fascist forces ===
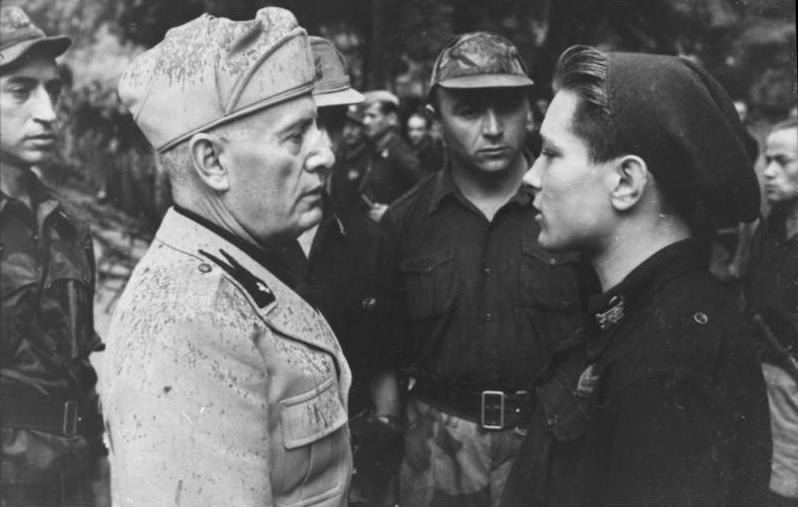
The head of RSI, Benito Mussolini, with a soldier in 1944

When the Italian Resistance movement began, consisting of various Italian soldiers of disbanded units and many young people not willing to be conscripted into the fascist forces, Mussolini's Italian Social Republic (RSI) also began putting together an army. This was formed with what was left of the previous Regio Esercito and Regia Marina corps, fascist volunteers, and drafted personnel. At first it was organized into four regular divisions (1ª Divisione Bersaglieri Italia – light infantry, 2ª Divisione Granatieri Littorio – grenadiers, 3ª Divisione fanteria di marina San Marco – marines, 4ª Divisione Alpina Monterosa – mountain troops), together with various irregular formations and the fascist militia Guardia Nazionale Repubblicana (GNR) that in 1944 were brought under the control of the regular army.

The fascist republic fought against the partisans to keep control of the territory. The fascists claimed their armed forces numbered 780,000 men and women, but sources indicate that there were no more than 558,000. Partisans and their active supporters numbered 82,000 in June 1944.

In addition to regular units of the Republican Army and the Black Brigades, various special units of fascists were organized, at first spontaneously and afterward from regular units that were part of Salò's armed forces. These formations, often including criminals, adopted brutal methods during counterinsurgency operations, repression and retaliation. Recruiting military forces was difficult for the RSI, as most of the Italian army had been interned by German forces in 1943, many Italians had been conscripted into forced labour in Germany and few wanted to fight on Nazi Germany's side after 8 September 1943; the RSI granted convicts freedom if they would join the army and the sentence of death was imposed on anyone who opposed being conscripted. Autonomous military forces in the RSI also fought against the Allies including the Decima Flottiglia MAS under command of Prince Junio Valerio Borghese. Borghese held no allegiance to Mussolini and even suggested that he would take him prisoner if he could.

Among the first to form was the banda of the Federal Guido Bardi and William Pollastrini in Rome, whose methods shocked even the Germans. In Rome, the Banda Koch helped dismantle the clandestine structure of the Partito d'Azione. The Banda Koch, led by Pietro Koch, then under the protection of General Kurt Mälzer, the German military commander for the Rome region, were known for their brutal treatment of anti-fascist partisans. After the fall of Rome, Koch moved to Milan. He gained the confidence of Interior Minister Guido Buffarini Guidi and continued his repressive activity in various Republican police forces. The Banda Carità, a special unit constituted within the 92nd Legion Blackshirts, operated in Tuscany and Veneto. It became infamous for violent repression, such as the 1944 Piazza Tasso massacre in Florence.

War flag of the Italian Social Republic

In Milan, the Squadra d'azione Ettore Muti (later Autonomous Mobile Legion Ettore Muti) operated under the orders of the former army corporal Francesco Colombo, already expelled from the PNF for embezzlement. Considering him dangerous to the public, in November 1943, the Federal (i.e., fascist provincial leader) Aldo Resega wanted to depose him, but was killed by a GAP attack. Colombo remained at his post despite complaints and inquiries. On 10 August 1944, Muti's Squadrists, together with the GNR, perpetrated the Piazzale Loreto massacre in Milan. The victims were fifteen anti-fascist rebels, killed in retaliation for an assault against a German truck. Following the massacre, the mayor and chief of the Province of Milan, Piero Parini, resigned in an attempt to strengthen the cohesion of moderate forces, who were undermined by the heavy German repression and various militias of Social Republic.

The command of the National Republican Army was in the hands of Marshall Graziani and his deputies Mischi and Montagna. They controlled the repression and coordinated anti-partisan actions of the regular troops, the GNR, the Black Brigades, and various semi-official police, together with the Germans, who made the reprisals. The Republican Army was augmented by the Graziani call-up which conscripted several thousand men. Graziani were only nominally involved in the armed forces, under the apolitical CSR.

The Republican Police Corps formed in 1944 under Lieutenant-General Renato Ricci. It included the fascist Blackshirts, the Italian Africa Police members serving in Rome, and the Carabinieri. The Corps worked against anti-fascist groups and was autonomous (it did not report to Rodolfo Graziani), according to an order issued by Mussolini on 19 November 1944.

== Background ==
Flag of Arditi del Popolo, an axe cutting a fasces. Arditi del Popolo was a militant anti-fascist group founded in 1921 in Italy.

The Italian Resistance has its roots in anti-fascism, which progressively developed in the period from the mid-1920s, when weak forms of opposition to the fascist regime already existed, until the beginning of World War II. Furthermore, in the memory of the partisan fighters, especially those of communist and socialist inspiration, the memory of the Biennio Rosso and of the violent struggles against the fascist squads in the period 1919–1922, considered by some exponents of the left-wing parties (among which Palmiro Togliatti himself) a true "civil war" in defence of the popular classes against the reactionary forces.

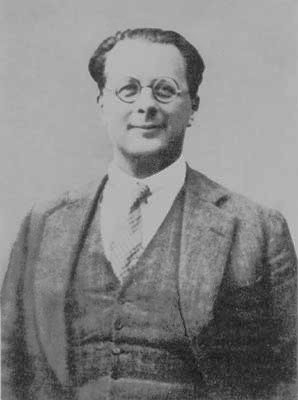
Carlo Rosselli

In Italy, Mussolini's Fascist regime used the term anti-fascist to describe its opponents. Mussolini's secret police was officially known as the Organization for Vigilance and Repression of Anti-Fascism. During the 1920s in the Kingdom of Italy, anti-fascists, many of them from the labor movement, fought against the violent Blackshirts and against the rise of the fascist leader Benito Mussolini. After the Italian Socialist Party (PSI) signed a pacification pact with Mussolini and his Fasces of Combat on 3 August 1921, and trade unions adopted a legalist and pacified strategy, members of the workers' movement who disagreed with this strategy formed Arditi del Popolo.

The Italian General Confederation of Labour (CGL) and the PSI refused to officially recognize the anti-fascist militia and maintained a non-violent, legalist strategy, while the Communist Party of Italy (PCd'I) ordered its members to quit the organization. The PCd'I organized some militant groups, but their actions were relatively minor. The Italian anarchist Severino Di Giovanni, who exiled himself to Argentina following the 1922 March on Rome, organized several bombings against the Italian fascist community. The Italian liberal anti-fascist Benedetto Croce wrote his Manifesto of the Anti-Fascist Intellectuals, which was published in 1925. Other notable Italian liberal anti-fascists around that time were Piero Gobetti and Carlo Rosselli.

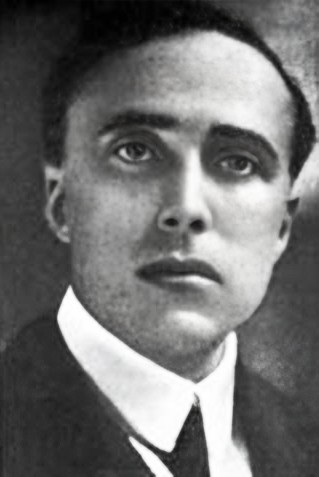
Giacomo Matteotti

After the murder of the socialist deputy Giacomo Matteotti (1924) and the decisive assumption of responsibility by Mussolini, the process of totalitarianization of the State began in the Kingdom of Italy, which will give rise to ever greater control and severe persecution of opponents, at risk of imprisonment and confinement.

The anti-fascists therefore organized themselves clandestinely in Italy and abroad, creating with great difficulty a rudimentary network of connections, which however did not produce significant practical results, remaining fragmented into small uncoordinated groups, incapable of attacking or threatening the regime, if some attacks carried out in particular by anarchists are excluded. Their activity was limited to the ideological side; the production of writings was copious, particularly among the anti-fascist exile communities, which however did not reach the masses and did not influence public opinion.

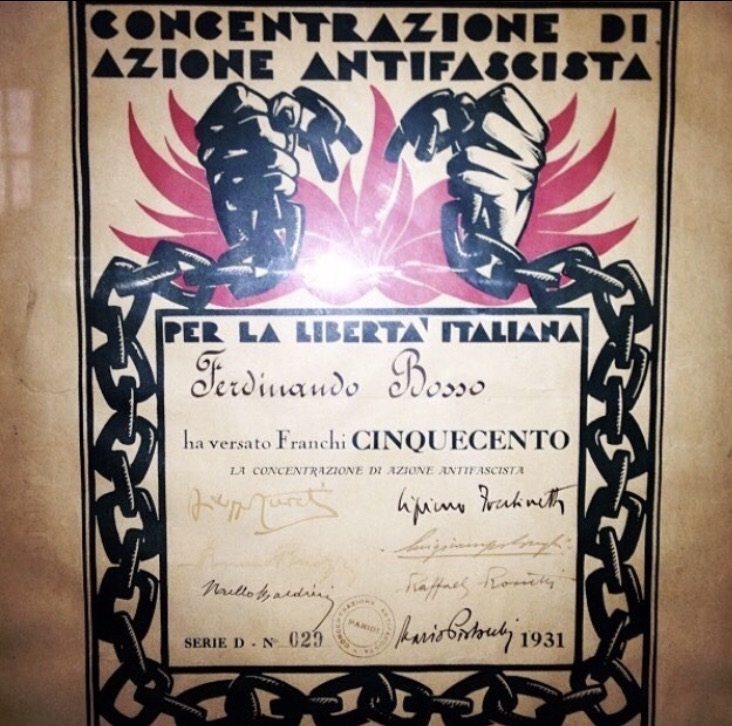
1931 badge of a member of Concentrazione Antifascista Italiana

Concentrazione Antifascista Italiana (English: Italian Anti-Fascist Concentration), officially known as Concentrazione d'Azione Antifascista (Anti-Fascist Action Concentration), was an Italian coalition of Anti-Fascist groups which existed from 1927 to 1934. Founded in Nérac, France, by expatriate Italians, the CAI was an alliance of non-communist anti-fascist forces (republican, socialist, nationalist) trying to promote and to coordinate expatriate actions to fight fascism in Italy; they published a propaganda paper entitled La Libertà.

Giustizia e Libertà (English: Justice and Freedom) was an Italian anti-fascist resistance movement, active from 1929 to 1945. The movement was cofounded by Carlo Rosselli, Ferruccio Parri, who later became Prime Minister of Italy, and Sandro Pertini, who became President of Italy, were among the movement's leaders. The movement's members held various political beliefs but shared a belief in active, effective opposition to fascism, compared to the older Italian anti-fascist parties. Giustizia e Libertà also made the international community aware of the realities of fascism in Italy, thanks to the work of Gaetano Salvemini.

Some historians have also underlined how the Resistance movement may have had links with the Spanish Civil War, in particular with those who had served in the International Brigades. Many Italian anti-fascists participated in the Spanish Civil War with the hope of setting an example of armed resistance to Franco's dictatorship against Mussolini's regime; hence their motto: "Today in Spain, tomorrow in Italy".

== Civil War ==
=== Background ===
==== The fall of the Fascist regime in Italy ====
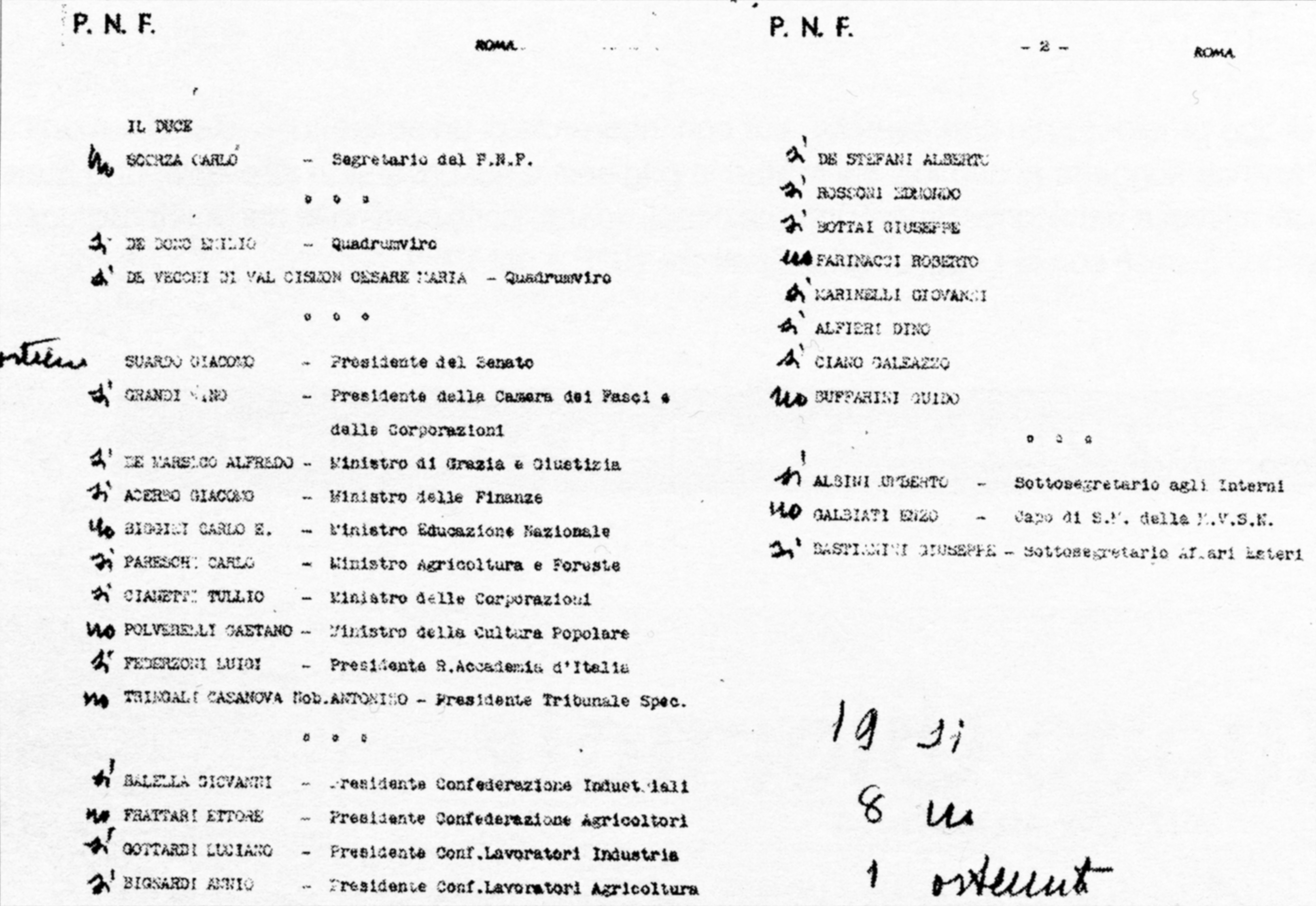
The official outcome of the vote of the Grandi agenda

After the victory achieved in the North African campaign, the Allies started the Italian Campaign: between 11 and 12 June 1943, Lampedusa and Pantelleria were the first Italian territories to be conquered in Operation Corkscrew. On 10 July, the landing in Sicily began, and on 19 July, Rome was bombed for the first time.

The threat of the invasion of the national territory, the conviction of the inevitability of defeat, the inability of Benito Mussolini to "detach himself from Germany", together with the awareness that his presence prevented any negotiations with the Allies, determined the fall of his government: on the night between 24 and 25 July, the Grand Council of Fascism approved a motion of no confidence against the prime minister, called the Grandi agenda, named after its promoter Dino Grandi. The next day King Victor Emmanuel III had Mussolini arrested and replaced him with Marshal Pietro Badoglio.

Faced with the coup d'état, the fascists remained inert and the army was able to occupy both Wedekind and Braschi palaces, the headquarters of the party and of the Roman federation respectively, without encountering resistance. In the absence of orders from General Enzo Galbiati (who had also voted against the dismissal of Mussolini), not even the Blackshirts moved, although they could count on the 1st Armored Division "M", made up of elements loyal to the regime, which was located north of Lake Bracciano.

==== The "45 days" ====
The news of Mussolini's resignation was considered by a part of the Italians, exhausted by the conflict, as proof of its imminent conclusion; there were manifestations of jubilation, but also of violence, with the destruction of goods and property of the National Fascist Party and party organizations and the removal and damage of symbols and monuments linked to fascism. However, the hopes of peace soon vanished, following the proclamation in which Badoglio announced: "The war continues. Italy [...] keeps its word ". Thus began the period of "forty-five days", in which secret negotiations began to conclude a separate peace with the Allies, disguised by public declarations of loyalty to Germany. Meanwhile, the Germans, prepared for the eventuality of an Italian surrender, were planning Operation Achse to occupy Italy.

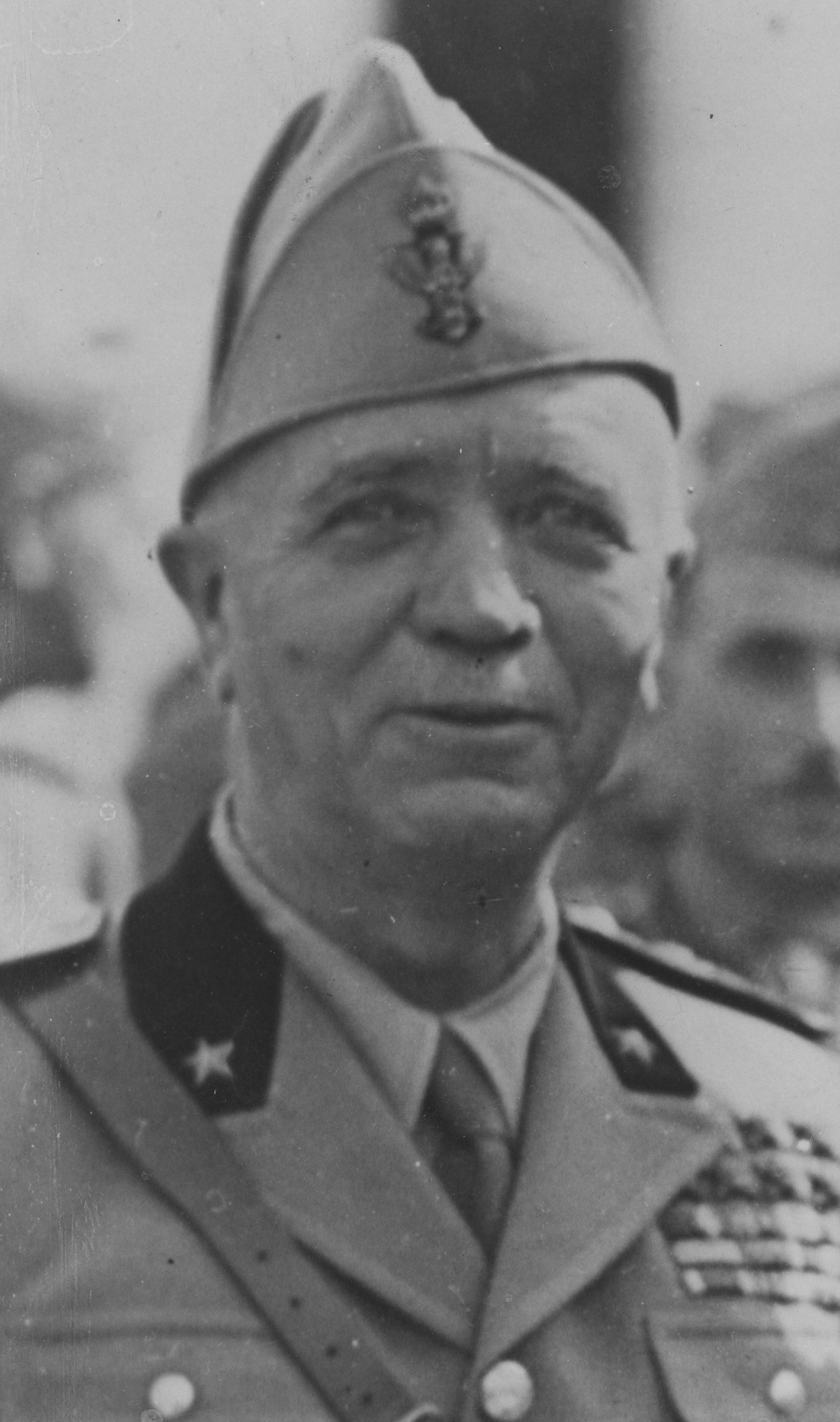
Pietro Badoglio

The Badoglio government began the work of dismantling the fascist state and took measures to maintain order in the country: it dissolved the PNF, maintained the prohibition of the establishment of political parties and imposed martial law. In addition, some anti-fascist demonstrations were bloodily repressed, such as those that took place on 28 July in Bari (massacre of via Nicolò dell'Arca) and Reggio Emilia (massacre of Reggiane), where the military fired at the demonstrators as set out in a circulated memo written by General Mario Roatta, chief of staff of the army, who ordered soldiers to face the riots "in combat formation" and to "open fire at a distance even with mortars and artillery without warning of any kind".

These provisions made it possible for the anti-fascists to spread the idea of a substantial continuity between the government of Mussolini and that of Badoglio, to the point of "asking oneself whether the liquidation of fascism is not by chance a tragic deception". This sentiment was also supported by the fact that many public officials of the fascist period in key posts had been left in their place by the new government, as remarked by the verse of La Badoglieide: "You called the squadrists back / the anti-fascists you put them in jail / the shirt was no longer black / but fascism remained the master."

Subsequently, Badoglio managed to completely neutralize the militia, incorporating it into the army and replacing the senior cadres with officers of sure monarchical faith. Galbiati's successor in command of the corps, Quirino Armellini, issued a circulated memo on July 30 in which he guaranteed Badoglio the harmlessness of the black shirts, stigmatizing "the reaction of the country, unpleasant and often brutal towards the militia", and assuring the will of the new government to continue the war against the Anglo-Americans, described as an enemy "animated by inhuman hatred and by the determined resolve to annihilate" the homeland, to which it was necessary to "oppose our breasts and our weapons, strenuously fighting alongside the ally".

In the same days, the anti-fascists began to reorganize themselves thanks to the return from prison, confinement or exile of numerous leaders: Luigi Longo, Pietro Secchia and Mauro Scoccimarro for the communists; Pietro Nenni, Sandro Pertini, Rodolfo Morandi and Giuseppe Saragat for the socialists; and Riccardo Bauer, Ugo La Malfa and Emilio Lussu for the actionists. The first anti-fascist organizations and the first "inter-party opposition committees" began to form, laying the foundations for the future National Liberation Committee. On 3 August, a delegation from the Central Opposition Committee - made up of Ivanoe Bonomi, Alcide De Gasperi, Luigi Salvatorelli, Meuccio Ruini and Giorgio Amendola - presented Badoglio with a declaration "complaining" from the government, "without hesitation and delay which could be fatal, the cessation of a war contrary to national traditions and interests and popular sentiments, the responsibility for which lies and must rest on the fascist regime".

During the night between 23 and 24 August, the fascist hierarch Ettore Muti - accused of plotting to restore power to Mussolini - was killed by the carabinieri sent to arrest him, officially during an escape attempt. Following the founding of the RSI, the fascists indicated Badoglio as the instigator of the killing and widely celebrated Muti as the first fallen of the civil war, claiming the conspiracy theory as proof that they had not remained inactive after 25 July. The argument that an attempt at a fascist revolt against Badoglio would have been prevented by the death of Muti - as well as by the absence of the "best fascists" engaged at the front, and by having believed in the continuation of the alliance with Germany - was re-proposed by the publications of Salò even after the war.

Estimates vary concerning the number of fascist fatalities during the 45 days. (Note: Nine fascists were killed in the whole period of 25 July to 8 September, according to police sources of the Central State Archives, cited in Gallerano, Ganapini & Legnani (1969), pp. 377–408, while De Felice (1997), p. 116 cites a Fascist source in which, instead, in the province of Milan alone there were 7 fascists killed or allegedly killed, 91 injured, 7190 expelled from work, and 345 homes from which the fascists were expelled.) In the following months, anti-fascists became convinced they had been excessively lenient towards the exponents of the deposed regime, so much so as to trace the beginning of the civil war to the fact that "the fascists returned because fascist blood was not shed on 25 July". Conversely, for the fascists, their "martyrdom" began on 25 July, for which they had to take revenge.

==== The armistice and the collapse of the Kingdom of Italy ====
In the weeks following the fall of Mussolini, while Italy continued the war alongside Germany, the new government tried with some confusion to get the country out of the conflict: on 3 September it signed the Armistice of Cassibile, imposed by the Allied Powers, and it unexpectedly announced the armistice with a radio message read by Marshal Badoglio on the evening of 8 September.

By 25 July, despite the initial enthusiasm with which most of the population received the news, it became clear that the armistice would not bring peace. The same day, the king and Badoglio fled the capital, taking refuge in Apulia with most of the members of the government, in order to avoid the feared German reaction to the Italian surrender. In a short time, the Germans carried out Operation Achse and occupied a large part of the peninsula, including Rome.

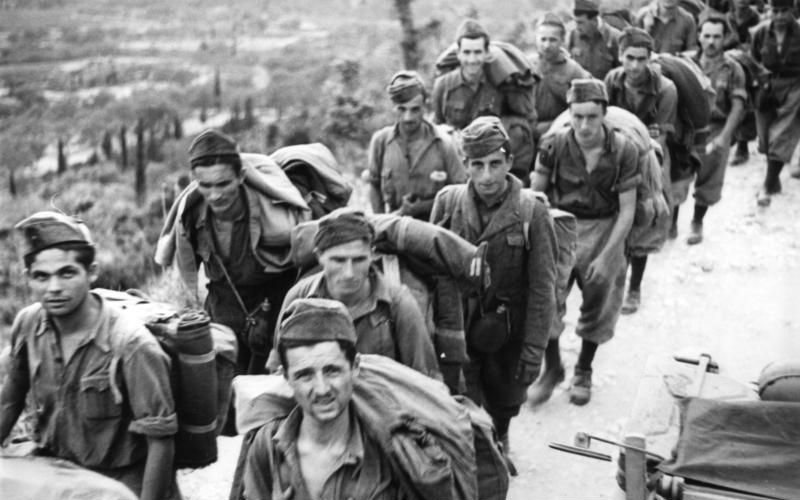
Italian soldiers taken prisoner by the Germans after 8 September in Corfu

In Italy and in the areas of occupation (southern France, the Balkans and Greece), there were hundreds of thousands of soldiers who, in the absence of orders, surrendered without fighting and were deported to Germany, where they were detained as "military internees". Others managed to get civilian clothes and find refuge, benefiting from the numerous demonstrations of solidarity in which the civilian population worked. The cases in which some units reacted successfully to the German aggression were rare and due to the lack of personal initiative of the commanders. In the cities, the scenes in which multitudes of disbanded Italian soldiers were quickly overwhelmed by a few German soldiers provoked anger and despair: it was the sudden defeat suffered at the hands of Italy's former allies, even more than the surrender to the Anglo-Americans, that was perceived as a "new immense Caporetto".

The announcement of the armistice took many Italians off guard: the circumstances in which it was made public caused soldiers and civilians to feel that they had been abandoned and left to themselves, the former by the officers and the latter by the public authorities respectively, and there were those who saw in 8 September and its consequences the moment of the disappearance of the national connective tissue.

Following the public disclosure of the armistice and the consequent events, Italy found itself divided into several political-territorial entities. The Badoglio government, presided over by the King, found itself exercising its authority only over a part of the territory of the Kingdom of Italy, corresponding mainly to the provinces of Brindisi and Taranto and to Sardinia. Only gradually did the Italian territories gradually conquered by the Anglo-Americans come under the royal jurisdiction. The Italian lands under Allied control not yet entrusted to the royal administration were subjected to a military occupation government, the Allied Military Government of Occupied Territories (AMGOT). In this context it was created the Italian Co-belligerent Army, which was made up of various divisions of the former Royal Italian Army during the period when it fought alongside the Allies.

=== Events ===
==== The outbreak of the civil war ====
Map of the Italian Social Republic (RSI). Its territory (marked in green) was the theatre of the civil war. In grey are the territories of the Kingdom of Italy.

In the days immediately following the armistice, with the eclipse of the power of the royal state, the two sides of the civil war began to take shape, the partisans and the fascists, both convinced that they legitimately represented Italy. Many of those who took up arms were caught by surprise by the armistice on one side or the other almost by chance and had to make their choice of side on the basis of circumstances. The decision was made more dramatic by the isolation in which it took place, since in the face of the collapse of the state there was no longer the possibility of referring to an authority, but only to one's own values. Of course, the choices were not all instantaneous and based on absolute certainties, rather "a nothing, a false step, a soaring of the soul" was enough to find oneself on the other side.

The choice was particularly burdensome for the military, bound on the one hand to honor their oath to the king and on the other to respect the alliance with the Germans, in both cases the penalty for their honor as soldiers; some solved the problem by appealing to their conscience: some, considering the oath to the King dissolved due to his behavior, presented themselves to the German commands asking to be enlisted, receiving as a badge an armband with a tricolor and the inscription Dienst der Deutschen Wehrmacht ("in the service of the German Wehrmacht"); others, while also considering themselves no longer bound by the oath to the King, still chose not to side with the Axis.

The historian Santo Peli writes that, after 8 September, the Italian soldiers captured by the Germanic armed forces were more than 800,000; of them about 186,000 chose to collaborate in various capacities with the Germans. "For the remaining, more than six hundred thousand, who initially refused to remain "faithful to the alliance", the doors of the camps are opened wide. [...] In the camps located in territories under the jurisdiction of the Wehrmacht, in February 1944, 615812 former Italian soldiers were still imprisoned, who had refused any collaboration with the German and fascist armed forces".

In some cases the fate after 25 July was also decisive, as happened to the future partisan commander Nuto Revelli:

Without Russia, by 8 September perhaps I would have hidden myself like a sick dog. If on the night of 25 July I had been beaten, today perhaps I would be on the other side. I am afraid of those who say they have always understood everything, who continue to understand everything. Understanding September 8 was not easy!

Riots and gun battles took place during the days of the armistice, but rarely involved Italians from both sides. The staff of the Royal Army in some cases changed the commands with elements of certain monarchical faith, as happened to the 1st Armored Division "M", which became the 136th Armored Legionary Division "Centauro" and was assigned to General Giorgio Calvi di Bergolo, son-in-law of the king; however, the Supreme Command did not consider the division reliable, since it did not move to defend Rome during the events of 8 September.

Relevant bloody events were recorded in Sardinia, where the Italian contingent, enjoying a clear numerical superiority and a good quality of the departments available, including the 184th Infantry Division "Nembo", forced the Germans to retreat from the island. Consequently, unlike the rest of Italy, there was no room for maneuver for those Italians who did not want to obey the armistice provisions and who therefore had to make the choice of side immediately. Sardinia was therefore the scene of "one of the first episodes of civil war", when at the announcement of the armistice the XII battalion of the "Nembo", under the command of Major Mario Rizzatti, mutinied to follow the Germans of the 90th Light Infantry Division and then continue the fight against the Anglo-Americans. Lieutenant Colonel Alberto Bechi Luserna, who was sent to quell this sedition, was killed by the mutineers. Five days later, the ordinary marshal Pierino Vascelli was killed by an unknown person, who, although he had not joined the mutineers, had not hidden his fascist feelings.

The 63rd battalion of the Black Shirts Tagliamento legion, made up of a hundred paratroopers from the Viterbo school, a part of the 10th Arditi department at Civitavecchia, and the soldiers of the 10th MAS Flotilla stationed in La Spezia, was commanded by Prince Junio Valerio Borghese, who reconstituted the body keeping the same name, mainly as a marine infantry.

In the general climate in which "everyone was as if possessed by a" need for great betrayals "against which to retaliate", both sides (although among the partisans there was a minority of convinced monarchists) were united by the condemnation of the king and di Badoglio: the fascists accused them of having betrayed the alliance with the Germans and of having thus compromised the honor of Italy in the eyes of the world, while the resisters of having prevented September 8 from "transforming into a triumphal and redemptive day of resurrection".

The first groups of fascists resumed the initiative; at the same time, in Rome - while the fighting between the Italian Royal Army and Wehrmacht still continued - the first National Liberation Committee was founded by the exponents of political anti-fascism, while, especially in Piedmont and Abruzzo, the first partisan groups were formed. In those days, the foundations of both "active resistance" and "passive resistance" were laid, with the civilian population offering solidarity and help to soldiers who went into hiding or who chose "not to choose", putting themselves in the "gray area" or among the "waiters".

==== Relations between the Kingdom of Italy and the Italian Social Republic ====
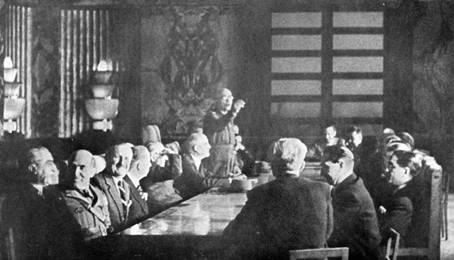
First meeting of the second Badoglio government in Salerno (22 April 1944)

The civil conflict fought between fascists and partisans rarely involved the armed forces of the Italian Social Republic and the Kingdom of Italy in direct clashes. The two Italian states in principle avoided deploying their own units at the front against the other's units. In some cases, however, Italian soldiers found themselves fighting other Italians: the Forlì Battalions Group of RSI framed in the 278th German Division faced the marines of the Folgore Combat Group of the Royal Army, with whom there were also clashes with dead and wounded, and that of the Cremona Combat Group, whose Battalion I collided with the remains of the retreating Decima MAS Barbarigo Battalion, in Santa Maria in Punta in the Polesine.

In the south, a fascist resistance movement against the Anglo-Americans also developed, which nevertheless had neither the extension nor the popular support of the anti-fascist one in the north. The press of the RSI propandistically magnified its entity through the figure of O 'Scugnizzo, a second lieutenant who worked in the south behind enemy lines, also the protagonist of a comic strip by Guido Zamperoni. Despite the attempts by Alessandro Pavolini to create real military units that operated with partisan tactics behind the allied lines, by Mussolini's express will the activity of the fascist resistance movement in the south was limited to espionage, propaganda and sabotage against occupation troops. There were cases of murder, such as that of the consul general of the militia Gianni Cagnoni, killed - presumably by the fascists for his activity as a double agent in intelligence with the allied secret services - in Sardinia in 1944.

More articulated and problematic is the question of the secret relations between the Italian Social Republic and the Kingdom of Italy, in particular between elements of the two military navies (and - within the Republican National Navy - of the 10th MAS) in order to achieve a modus vivendi and to avoid direct clashes between the two Armed Forces, and - towards the end of the conflict - to try to plan a joint landing action in Istria, in order to avert the danger of the Yugoslav invasion. However, direct contacts between Borghese's emissaries and the ship's captain Agostino Calosi, as well as with Ivanoe Bonomi and Admiral De Courten, did not lead to any results, due to the opposition of Germany and United Kingdom, who for similar reasons did not like the Italian presence in Julian March. Different results were obtained instead in the involvement, after the war, of ex marines in anti-communist stay-behind organizations or in secret operations such as the sinking under British commission of ships loaded with weapons bound for the Zionists in Palestine.

==== The war on the internal enemy ====
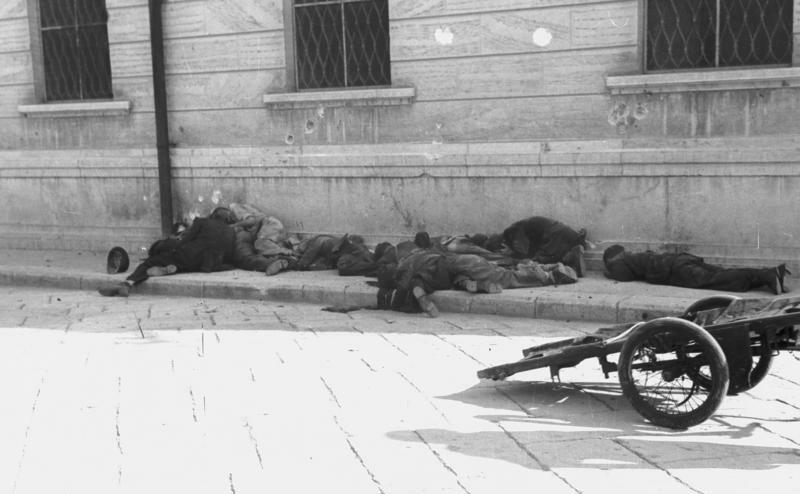
Italian partisans shot by invading Germans in Barletta, 12 September 1943

Among the most significant bloody events that occurred in the phase immediately following the establishment of the Italian Social Republic was the killing of the federal Igino Ghisellini, which took place on 14 November 1943. During the Congress of Verona of the Republican Fascist Party, the news that Ghisellini had been killed provoked a mob reaction that resulted in retaliation on eleven anti-fascists unrelated to the assassination, a gesture defined as "stupid and bestial" by Mussolini himself. Such was the negative impression that this episode was raised as the "first murder of the civil war" and as the end of any hope "of reconciliation of the Italians".

Regardless of who physically fired "the first shot", Claudio Pavone dismisses the problem of the "first shot" as "not very productive" and starts from the conclusions of Giorgio Bocca ("It is obvious that the anti-fascists are the first to move and that the Communists move first "), considering them however not exhaustive and in need of integration through the analysis of the" desire for revenge "of the republican fascists. Renzo De Felice traces the origin of the civil war to the birth of the Italian Social Republic: according to the historian, the foundation of a fascist Italian state, a collaborationist with Nazi Germany, prevented the Resistance from assuming an exclusive national character of liberation from the Germans and transformed it into a movement of political and social struggle, in which the Communists played a part of great importance.

Some attempts to avoid the outbreak of a civil war made by various fascist exponents were soon set aside in the face of the developments of the events, the reality of the harsh German occupation, and the increasing violence of the partisan groups. Soon the intransigents of the newborn Republican Fascist Party had the upper hand. The Communists took the initiative to bring armed resistance against the new fascism, allied to the Germans, into the cities; after a series of attacks, the Gruppi di Azione Patriottica killed the head of the Turin Militia Domenico Giardina on 29 October and then the attacks spread to all cities: in Rome (an attack on the Adriano Theater where Marshal Graziani was speaking), in Florence, in Genoa, and in Ferrara.

Faced with this series of attacks, the intransigent fascists, Pavolini first of all, had the opportunity to assert their position and impose a crackdown on Mussolini too: at the end of November, Mezzasoma ordered the newspapers to cease all discussion about the possible "pacification".

The first partisan formations - almost all of a military nature, because they were mainly made up of disbanded soldiers of the Royal Army or former prisoners of war who fled the concentration camps - were hit by the German reaction and destroyed because they used tactics of territorial garrison and maintenance of cornerstones through a rigid and concentrated defense, rather than adopting guerrilla warfare; an example was the fate of the Cinque giornate group, which was besieged in the fort of San Martino above Varese by the Germans and forced to surrender. Consequently, the partisan movement achieved better results with the creation of teams and groups of minimum dimensions - cells - with which to carry out attacks.

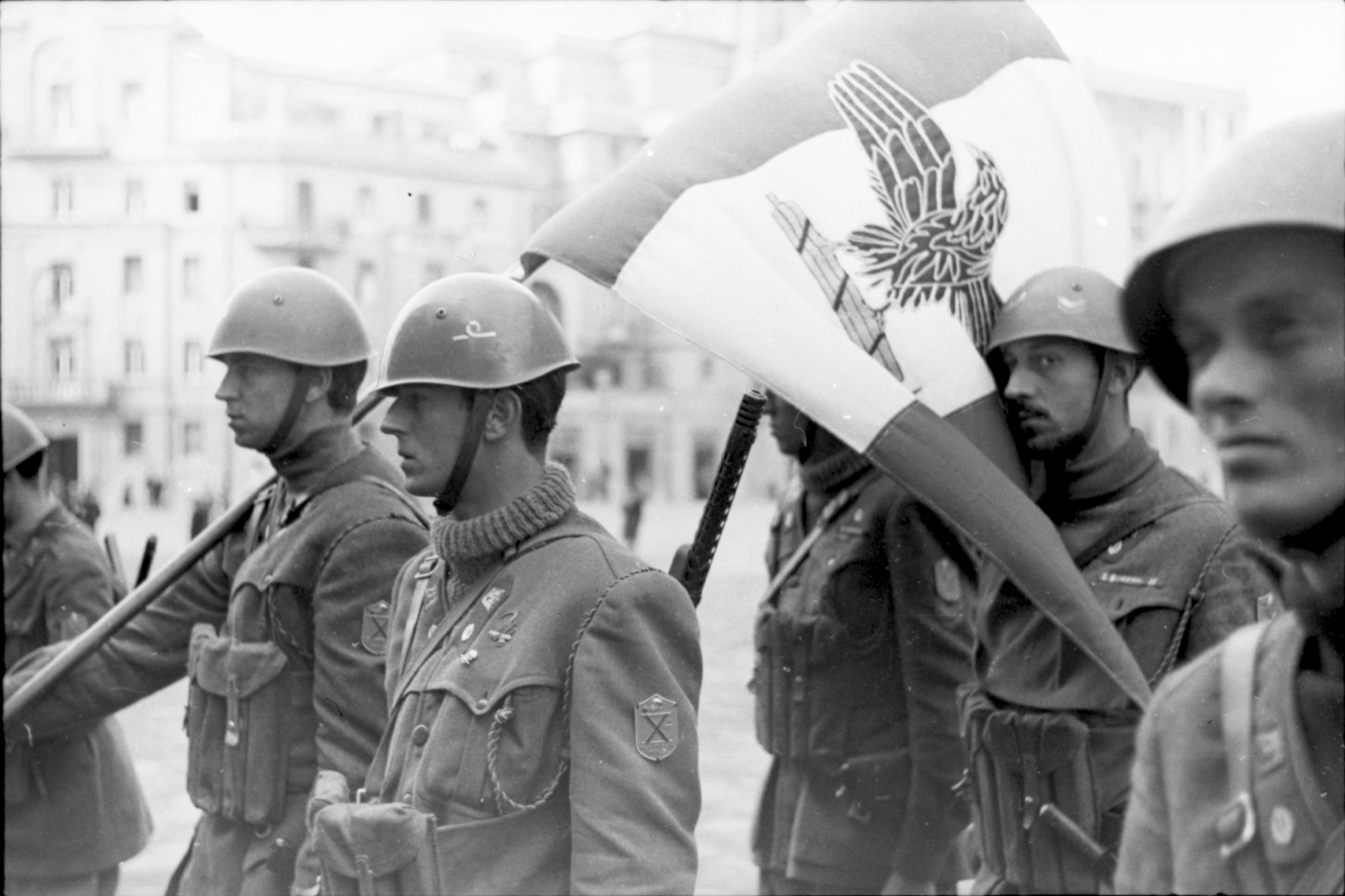
Soldiers of the Italian Social Republic deployed to the Battle for Anzio (22 January 1944)

However, it was with the "Bando Graziani" of 19 February 1944 that the Resistance acquired a mass of men sufficient to be able to create a real clandestine army behind the German lines. In fact, until February 1944, according to Ferruccio Parri, the partisan armed forces amounted to a total of 9,000. With the proclamation of the mass draft, at least seventy thousand young people joined the partisans so as not to have to submit to enlistment, and a good part of them went to swell the resistance units. To these it was then necessary to add the units of the plain and the cities, the "patriots" and the supporters, who during the period of maximum partisan activity reached 200,000 men and women. In the spring-summer of 1944, the strength of the partisan movement was such as to allow the creation of ephemeral partisan republics, which managed to survive until the autumn-winter of the same year, when they were destroyed by Italian-German counter-offensives. In particular, Mussolini defined the operations against the Piedmontese partisan republics as a "march of the Social Republic against the Vendée", referring to the episode of the French civil wars where the revolutionary armies crushed the Vendean legitimist uprisings.

With regard to the partisans, who were ever more daring in their enterprises, the Germans decided to use the forces of the Italian Social Republic to an ever greater extent, also relying on the most intransigent personalities, and linking the "repression of rebellion" to an internal Italian problem with which Italians should occupy themselves. In this way, in addition to delegating the "dirty work" to others, they also managed to keep the RSI forces busy, which otherwise - if employed at the front - would have created problems of a military and political nature.

Following the breakthrough of the front on the Gustav Line and the allied advance into central Italy, many of the National Republican Guard garrisons disbanded. In contrast, especially in Tuscany, the armed elements directly dependent on the Party managed to some extent to organize themselves and to offer a last resistance to the enemy advance and to the partisan attacks. The snipers of Florence kept numerous allied and partisan units in check for several days. These episodes gave Alessandro Pavolini the possibility of obtaining the militarization of the Party from Mussolini through the establishment of the Black Brigades, founded with the declared intention of fighting first of all against the partisans even before the Allies: their creation represented the point of no return of the civil war, defined by Pavolini as a "war of religion", so much so that their creation is identified as "the culminating point of the fascist commitment in the civil war". The brigades were eminently used in anti-partisan operations, but also, although this was contrary to their original intent, in police tasks, such as arrests and requisitions, also aimed at capturing Jews; only sporadically did they participate in war clashes, which involved those units that found themselves having to face the allied units on the offensive or that remained in the northern cities after the evacuation of regular troops, forming resistance groups and snipers.

The Black Brigades and the National Republican Guard distinguished themselves by their lack of discipline and the extreme harshness used in the repression, to the point that on several occasions the German commands themselves and sometimes the Italian Quaestors protested the gratuitous violence, summary executions and their spectacularization through the display of corpses in the streets. For example, at the end of 1944, General Fridolin von Senger und Etterlin worried about the maintenance of public order, contested the methods of Franz Pagliani's brigade against the fascist authorities of Bologna, and then determined his expulsion from the city at the beginning of 1945.

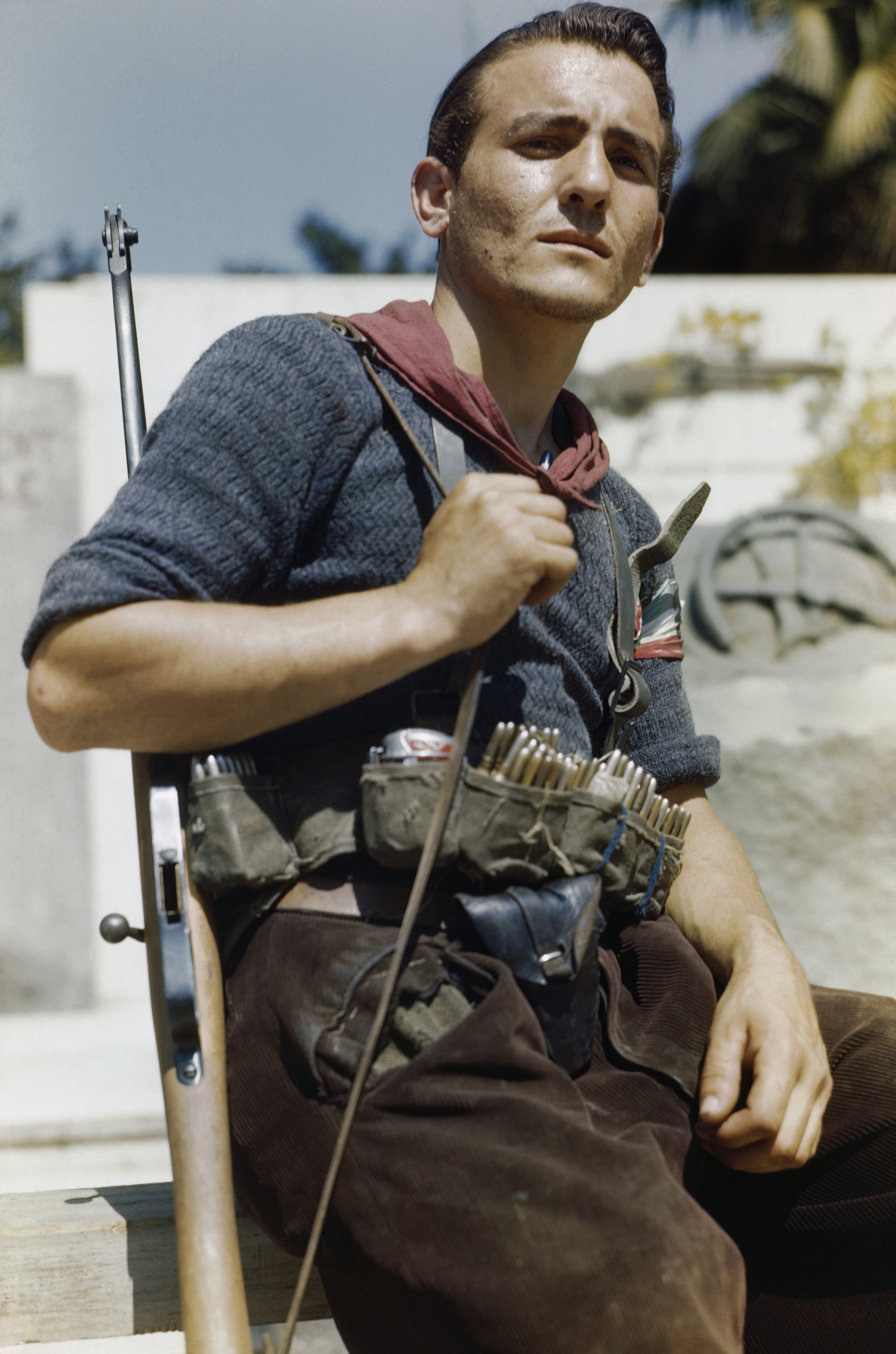
An Italian partisan in Florence, 14 August 1944

The most important military operation in which the brigades took part was the action, successfully carried out in concert with the National Republican Guard and German units, of the reconquest of the Ossola Valley and the destruction of the homonymous partisan republic. The need for the Italian Social Republic to maintain order and reassert sovereignty over the territory was also imperative to be able to manage relations with the Germans, in order to try to regain positions and at the same time prevent the German authorities - with the excuse of having to secure the rear to their armies - from bypassing the fascist authorities. Despite all efforts, this objective was missed, and the increasingly harsh outbreak of the civil war, combined with the inability of the fascists to independently maintain public order and oppose the partisans, allowed the Germans to erode even the little power that the RSI had managed to get.

In this "three-way" war, the Germans maintained an ambiguous attitude, not hesitating to sacrifice the fascists in the name of quiet co-existence with the partisans. In several cases, the Germans offered the partisan commands with whom they had come in contact "carte blanche" in their actions against the fascists provided that Germanic units were spared. Although many of the partisan commanders rejected similar agreements, the climate of greater "hatred against the fascists over that against the Germans" seems to have motivated the partisans to fight. This kind of motivation was prevalent among the partisans of the shareholder area, while some communist commissioners nonetheless viewed with concern the possibility of a "clouding of the national character of the struggle". In other cases, local agreements were sometimes reached, especially with non-shareholder or communist partisan elements, for example the Green Flames, with tactical purposes or to achieve a patriotic modus vivendi or even with temporary alliances "for the struggle extremist gangs and common criminals" present in large areas of the country.

These contacts obtained the result of provoking bitter contrasts within both sides: the partisan formations accused each other of secret contacts with the enemy, and of exploiting temporary truces with the Nazi-fascists in order to give time to reorganize, to the detriment of partisan units of different ideological alignments, or of wanting to keep leaving the bulk of the losses to others, waiting for the right moment for a showdown. In particular, shareholders and communists in their complaints show the fear of close ties behind them between "center and right" partisans with the Nazi-fascists. Furthermore, the communists believed that the autonomous partisans, due to the anti-communism of their commanders, could become the Italian equivalents of the Chetniks, monarchical Yugoslav partisans, in sharp contrast with the communist partisans of Tito.

The Porzûs massacre saw communist partisans of the Natisone division (of the SAP brigade 13 martiri di Feletto), attached to the Yugoslavian IX Corps by orders of Palmiro Togliatti, massacre 20 partisans and a woman at the HQ of one of the many Catholic Osoppo Brigades, claiming that they were German spies. Among the dead were commander Francesco De Gregori (uncle of the singer Francesco De Gregori) and brigade commissioner Gastone Valente.

The problem of the civil war between Italians was deeply felt by both warring factions: many had strong conscientious objections to this type of war, but many were also intransigent. Furthermore, although the Anglo-American military commands did not at all want an oversized growth of the partisan movement and its military commitment beyond the allied needs (essentially: espionage and information gathering; sabotage; rescue of agents, downed pilots, and allied fugitives), the allied propaganda radios (Radio Algeri, Radio Londra, Radio Milano Libertà, Radio Bari) openly incited the murder of exponents of republican fascism, issuing intimidating warnings and disseminating news about their domiciles, habits, acquaintances, and any coverings of these, so that they would feel perennially hunted down.

The forces of the Italian Social Republic struggled to keep the insurgency under wraps, resulting in a heavy toll on the German occupation forces stationed to buttress them. Field Marshall Albert Kesselring estimated that from June to August 1944 alone, Italian partisans inflicted a minimum of 20,000 casualties on the Germans (5,000 killed, 7,000 to 8,000 captured/missing, and the same number wounded), while suffering far lower casualties themselves. Kesselring's intelligence officer supplied a higher figure of 30,000 - 35,000 casualties from partisan activity in those three months (which Kesselring considered too high): 5,000 killed and 25,000-30,000 missing or wounded.

==== Special fascist groups ====
In addition to the regular units of the Italian Social Republic Army and the Black Brigades, various special fascist units operated, often initially formed spontaneously and then framed in the armed forces of Salò. These formations, made up largely of common criminals, often adopted brutal methods during operations of counter-insurgency, repression, retaliation and counter-intelligence.

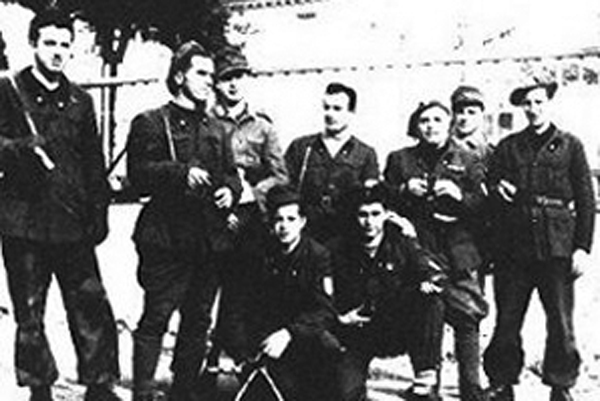
The Banda Koch

Among the first to form, there was the gang of the federals Guido Bardi and Guglielmo Pollastrini in Rome, whose crude and vulgar methods scandalized even the Germans. Subsequently, the Koch Band was very active in Rome and contributed to dismantling the structure of the Action Party in the capital. The so-called Banda Koch, led by Pietro Koch, a controversial personality initially connected with Bardi and Pollastrini, later under the protection of General Kurt Mälzer, military commander of the square, was distinguished by violent methods also based on torture against partisans and anti-fascists. After the fall of Rome, Koch moved to Milan and became the trusted man of the Minister of the Interior Guido Buffarini Guidi, continuing his repressive action and participating in the internal struggles between the various powers and various police forces of the Republic. The Banda Carità was active in Tuscany and Veneto, established as a Special Services Department within the 92nd Black Shirt Legion, which became the protagonist of gestures such as the Massacre of Piazza Tasso.

In Milan, on the other hand, the Ettore Muti Action Squad (later the Mobile Autonomous Legion Ettore Muti) operated under the orders of the former army corporal Francesco Colombo, already expelled from the PNF during the twenty years for embezzlement. Considering him dangerous for public order, in November 1943 the federal Aldo Resega wanted to dismiss him, but he was killed by a Gruppi di Azione Patriottica attack; Colombo remained in his post, despite various complaints and inquiries. It was the Muti squads together with National Republican Guard soldiers who carried out the Piazzale Loreto massacre on 10 August 1944, in which fifteen anti-fascist detainees were victims, in retaliation for an assault on a German truck. Following the massacre, the same mayor and head of the province of Milan, Piero Parini, resigned in an attempt to strengthen the cohesion of the moderate forces, undermined by the harshness of the German repression and the various militias of the Social Republic.

The chain of command of the National Republican Army, firstly in the person of Marshal Rodolfo Graziani and subordinately by his deputies, Mischi and Montagna, contributed to the anti-partisan repression by coordinating the actions of the regular troops, the National Republican Guard, the Black Brigades and the various semi-official police forces. Concert with the Germans, who were also often given information on people and groups of resisters who were then used for reprisals. Moreover, it certainly contributed to making this Army a truly operational instrument, due to Bando Graziani. However, Graziani ensured that the armed forces of Italian Social Republic were unitary and apolitical, therefore dependent not on the Republican Fascist Party, but on the supreme command of the armed forces.

==== The common delinquency ====
The collapse of the central authority, the subsequent difficult resumption of the royal government in the south and the republican fascist government in the north caused a power vacuum from which individuals and gangs dedicated to banditry and delinquency took control. Throughout the country, there was a resurgence of criminal activity, often favored also by the murky political climate of the period, with adherence from time to time to this or that political faction or belligerent power.

Robbery, torture, pillage, lynching: concepts from which every honest mind was alien [...] have become our daily spiritual bread. [...] The crime news has jumped from the fourth page of the newspapers to the first.

— Il Corriere di Roma, 20 September 1944

The impact on the populations was very severe. In many areas of the Italian Social Republic, the authorities were unable to cope with the spread of banditry, due to the crisis in the control of the territory caused by the internment of numerous carabinieri (due to their monarchical loyalty) and by the incomplete or inadequate replacement of the carabinieri with the soldiers of the Republican National Guard. In some areas, the inaction of all state powers and the presence of banditry and delinquency pushed the local populations to organize their own armed patrols to defend their properties.

In some cases, the fascist or partisan elements themselves (even openly) were committing acts of banditry; there were episodes in which men disguised in fake uniforms carried out robberies, both to make use of the awe that the sight of a uniform caused in the people, and to create a real "damage to image" to the enemy, causing the enemy to fall on them. Furthermore, by their very nature, the partisan guerrillas needed "self-financing" and consequently "the robberies of banks, company coffers and to the detriment of wealthy owners and entrepreneurs [...] became almost a necessity to which all or almost all formations ended up resorting to abandoning themselves (especially Garibaldi's ones) very often to abuses, impositions, robberies and indiscriminate violence ... ".

For the partisans, therefore, the problem of distinguishing themselves from common bandits soon arose, since the uncertainty of the "demarcation line" between partisan and banditry seriously damaged the image of the Resistance among the population. On this problem, Nuto Revelli wrote:

The phenomenon of banditry is spreading. Disbanded ex soldiers of the 4th Army and local criminals, masquerading as partisan, terrorize the populations. An alpine hat, a gray-green jacket is enough to confuse the waters. We will fish many, we will shoot many. If we want to prevent the Germans and the fascists from making a shit out of every weed, speculating about it to defame us, we will not have to forgive.

In addition to collaborating with the carabinieri in the service of the Italian Social Republic, the partisan commands adopted rigorous measures to suppress crime. In the first place, the formations that did not recognize the authority of the National Liberation Committee and the Volunteer Corps of Freedom were marginalized and denied any legitimacy. It was also decreed that anyone who used National Liberation Committee collection vouchers and usurped its name would be tried by a popular court, while anyone who did so without even using the name would be shot. The severity of these measures, evidenced by the numerous death sentences inflicted on the partisans who were guilty of robbery and theft, was required - as Claudio Pavone points out - by the "need for self-legitimation without shadows of the resistance movement" .

A mirror image of the situation was created by the abuses and robberies committed by Germans and fascists, which were often uncontrollable despite every effort and stigmatization by the central power. Crazed splinters of both sides behaved in a bandit-like manner. Among the Germans, moreover, those departments formed by "ost" elements (Tartars, White Russians and, to a lesser extent, Cossacks, etc.) were particularly noteworthy. They often committed violence and rape, and not infrequently had to be held at bay with real counter-terrorism by the military authorities of the Italian Social Republic.

It is difficult to study the problem of common crime in the context of the civil war, since the primary sources of the fascist or German side (news and reports from the police headquarters, the GNR commands and the Ministry of the Interior) and the reports (war diaries, memorials) are vitiated from a political point of view, which tends to indiscriminately confuse partisans, brigands, fascist soldiers and common robbers. Furthermore, the nature of the internal war created adhesions, role exchanges, intelligences between factions, such as to make it sometimes impossible to distinguish between political fighters and simple criminals or even between fighters of one or the other side. An example is the case of the so-called "Battalion Davide", a partisan formation dedicated to banditry common in the Canelli area, severely opposed by the fascist roundups, which suddenly made itself available to the authorities, even proposing itself as a "bersaglieri battalion". After violent disagreements both with the fascists of the National Guard ("Davide" - aka Giovanni Ferrero - publicly defined himself as "anti-fascist" and "pro-German" and his men provocatively shouted "death to the Duce") and with other partisan gangs of the surroundings, arbitrariness taken en bloc by the Nazis to be employed in the Schutzstaffel and as a guard in the Risiera di San Sabba in Trieste. In Turin, the GNR captured a gang of juvenile offenders who robbed tobacconists and other commercial businesses by issuing "promissory notes" with a false "Garibaldi Brigade" stamp.

In the territory of the Kingdom during this period, there was the birth of the phenomenon of the bandit Salvatore Giuliano, on whose criminal or political role, adherence with American occupiers or even with fringes of the fascist-republican secret services the historiographic debate is still open. In the Kingdom, the allied occupation and the dramatic social and economic situation favored the rebirth of the Camorra phenomenon, especially in Naples and Bari, where the presence of allied logistic bases was fertile ground for traffic of the black market and for prostitution, including child prostitution. Even in the South, there was a resurgence of banditry (also of a social nature and driven by the traditional reasons of hunger, desperation and the collapse of every state reference), of common and organized crime, corruption, due to the lack of authority exercised by the Royal Government.

=== The end of the fighting and war ===
==== The general insurrection ====
In early 1945, realizing that the war was lost, the commander of the SS and German police forces in Italy (Höhere SS und Polizeiführer, HSSPF), SS-Obergruppenführer Karl Wolff, made contact with allied secret agents in Switzerland. In an attempt to win the Allies' sympathies, he ordered several releases of captured partisans (first of all, Ferruccio Parri) and then on 12 March 1945 he imposed the cessation of anti-partisan operations on the troops under him, except for self-defense and the minimum necessary to save the "necessary appearance". This order was reiterated on 26 April, the day following the insurrection.

On 9 April 1945, the Allies launched the final offensive on the Gothic Line. On 10 April, the PCI sent a letter to the Communist partisan commands to be ready for an insurrection in any case. On 19 April, the entire National Liberation Committee for Northern Italy agreed on the insurrection.

In the meantime, Mussolini had abandoned Gargnano and gone to Milan, where he hoped to be able to make contact both with the anti-fascists of the National Liberation Committee for Northern Italy and with any foreign agents. Through these negotiations was the curia of Cardinal Alfredo Ildefonso Schuster. The last days of the Italian Social Republic became convulsive, with overlapping contradictory orders, while some elements - mainly in General Diamanti's Guardia di Finanza - had already secretly allied with the enemy. The allied invasion of the Po Valley after 20 April had become unstoppable.

In the last days of the Italian Social Republic, it was the Black Brigades who offered some opposition against the Allied invasion and the partisan insurrection; about 5,000 black brigadists formed the backbone of the so-called "Colonna Pavolini", which, in the intention of the hierarch, should have reached the Valtellina for the last stand. In Turin, in particular, the snipers of the Black Brigade Ather Capelli opposed the partisan forces until the end of April 1945. In Romagna, some Black Brigades - during the retreat - prevented the Germans from destroying and reprisals.

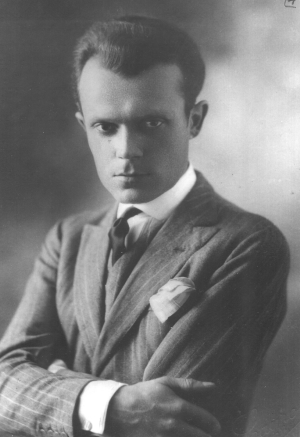
The partisan Sandro Pertini, who ordered, on 25 April 1945, the general insurrectionary strike in the city of Milan. He was later President of the Italian Republic from 1978 to 1985

The Social Republic had only a few days left, and Mussolini was agitated between various options. He was trying to initiate socialization, to leave Italy a socialist legacy (the "dragon eggs"), also as a final revenge against the "plutocracies". On the military level, while Diamanti and Borghese proposed to wait for the inevitable surrender of a weapon in the foot, Pavolini and Costa continued to advocate the idea of extreme resistance in Valtellina, while Graziani still remained convinced that the German troops were fighting loyally alongside those of CSR and rejected any hypothesis of an agreement that would have allowed the Germans for the second time to accuse Italy of treason.

After an unsuccessful attempt on the afternoon of 25 April to negotiate with the National Liberation Committee for Northern Italy exponents with the mediation of Cardinal Schuster and disoriented by the discovery of Wolff's secret negotiations with the Anglo-Americans, Mussolini decided to leave Milan in the direction of Lake Como at 8 PM, for reasons that are still not clear.

On the same day, while the gun battles between insurgents and Italian Social Republic and German forces multiplied, Sandro Pertini proclaimed on the radio the general insurrectionary strike in the city of Milan:

Citizens, workers! General strike against the German occupation, against the fascist war, for the salvation of our lands, our houses, our factories. As in Genoa and Turin, you confront the Germans with the dilemma: to surrender or die

— Sandro Pertini, 25 April 1945

Also on the same day, the National Liberation Committee for Northern Italy - whose command was based in Milan and was chaired by Alfredo Pizzoni, Luigi Longo, Emilio Sereni, Sandro Pertini, and Leo Valiani (present among others the designated president Rodolfo Morandi, Giustino Arpesani, and Achille Marazza) - proclaimed a general insurrection in all the territories still occupied by the Nazi-fascists, indicating to all the partisan forces active in Northern Italy that were part of the Volunteer Corps of Freedom to attack the fascist and German garrisons by imposing the surrender, days before the arrival of the Allied troops; at the same time, the National Liberation Committee for Northern Italy personally issued legislative decrees, assuming power "in the name of the Italian people and as a delegate of the Italian Government", establishing among other things the death sentence for all fascist hierarchs, including Benito Mussolini, who would be shot and killed three days later. "Surrender or die!" was the rallying call of the partisans that day and those immediately following. Today the event is commemorated in Italy every 25 April by the Liberation Day, National Day introduced on 22 April 1946, which celebrates the liberation of the country from fascism.

==== Arrival of the partisans in the big cities and latest clashes ====
From the morning of April 26, the whole Po Valley was in a state of insurrection. The Germans were in retreat under the bombing of the allied air force and the American advance guard beyond the Po river in Guastalla and Borgoforte were fighting against the "Etna" division, against the "Debiça" battalion of the Italian SS, and against the armoured group "Leonessa". For the troops of the Social Republic, the "Artificial Fog plan" was still valid, which in the intentions of Kesselring and Vietinghoff should have led to a strategic retreat behind the Po-Ticino line for an all-out resistance.

The Italian Social Republic forces were at this point abandoned: the German divisions of the Liguria Army on the Alpine front (DXXV Armeekorps, General Schlemmer) were retreating from 23 towards the Po-Ticino line, without having notified the Italian departments of the "Littorio" divisions and "Monterosa", which remained alone to face the French offensive and partisan attacks. The divisions and departments deployed on the southern front (Savonese, Langhe and Garfagnana) instead remained compact, and began to fall back towards Ivrea in long columns, especially after the breakthrough of the Green Line in Massa, held by the unstable 148th German Infantry Division.

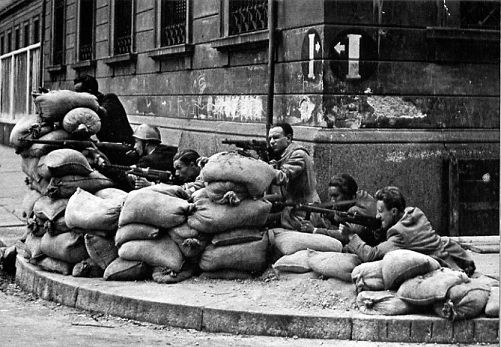
Italian partisans in Milan, April 1945

In Genoa, the commander of the square, General Meinhold, unsuccessfully tried to negotiate with the partisans of the Garibaldian Pinan-Cichero brigade stationed in the mountains near the city, while the vessel captain Bernighaus organized the destruction of the port. After violent clashes in the centre between the GAP squads and the Garibaldini of the Balilla brigade and the German and fascist units, General Meinhold signed the surrender of the garrison at 19.30 on 25 April. The captain of the vessel Berlinghaus and the captain Mario Arillo of the 10th MAS nevertheless continued the resistance, determined to carry out the planned destruction; after new clashes with the partisans of Cichero and Mingo who went down to the city on the evening of 26 April, the last Nazi-Fascist units surrendered. The partisans had saved the port from destruction and captured 6,000 prisoners, who were handed over to the allies, who arrived in Nervi on 27 April.

In Turin, while some Nazi-fascist columns were heading towards Ivrea, to wait for the Allies and surrender, the Italian Social Republic departments gathered some forces and engaged in bitter clashes with the partisans who reached the city from the mountains on 28 April. The German military columns managed to fall back through the town. So, while some departments of the Italian Social Republic were leaving the Piedmontese capital to go to Valtellina, the bulk of the Turin fascists who remained in arms decided to continue fighting. The Garibaldi brigades of "Nanni", the autonomous ones of "Mauri", and the "Justice and Freedom" departments freed a large part of the city after violent fighting and safeguarded the bridges awaiting the arrival of the allies, who arrived in Turin on May 1.

On the evening of 25 April, Milan was still relatively quiet. Some fascist units determined to fight had left the city, while some Germans remained under arms in their neighbourhoods, without fighting in accordance with Wolff's orders. The "Aldo Resega" Black Brigade abandoned its positions within the city, and the Republican National Guard dissolved spontaneously, while the Xth MAS, instead of retreating to Valtellina, remained stationed and surrendered without a fight. The Guardia di Finanza instead joined the insurgents and, commanded by Alfredo Malgeri, easily occupied, on the night of 25 and 26 April, the main focal points of the city. On April 27, at 5.30 pm, the Garibaldian partisans of the Cino Moscatelli brigades arrived in the city with little difficulty, while other departments occupied Busto Arsizio and the roads to Valtellina, on which, in theory, the last Italian Social Republic departments should have fallen back.

==== The death of Mussolini ====
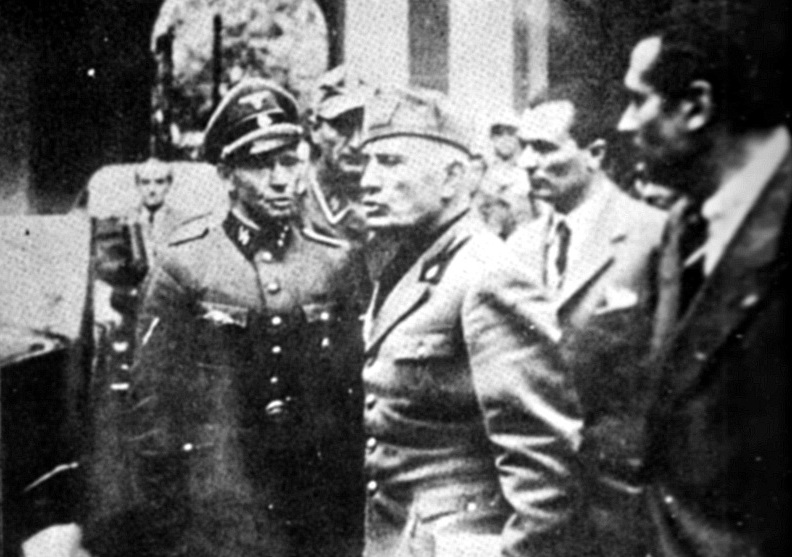
Mussolini abandoning the Prefecture in Milan on 25 April 1945 (believed to be the last photograph of him alive)

On the evening of 25 April, Mussolini left Milan, followed by a column of fascists, determined to reach Valtellina. After a stop in Como and several confused movements along the western coast of the lake, the fascist column, which had joined a German anti-aircraft unit, was stopped by partisans. Mussolini was arrested and taken - together with his mistress Clara Petacci - to Bonzanigo, a frazione of Mezzegra, where he spent the night between 27 and 28 April.

On 28 April, Mussolini, Petacci, and sixteen other leaders and members of the fascist column were killed by the partisans on the Dongo lakefront. There are controversial hypotheses and interpretations on the modalities of Mussolini's killing, on who ordered it and who actually carried it out. Subsequently, the 18 corpses were transported to Milan, where on 29 April, exposed in Piazzale Loreto (site of a previous bloody fascist reprisal), they outraged the crowd.

==== Post-war violence and Togliatti amnesty ====
Some historians who have dealt with the civil war in Italy have also taken into consideration the phenomenon of post-war violence, placing the end of the civil war beyond the official end of the Second World War in Europe. Therefore, for them, it is not easy to identify a real end date of the phenomenon, which slowly faded away. Some have proposed the Togliatti amnesty of 22 June 1946 as the end of the civil war.

Immediately after the forces of the Partisan Resistance succeeded in assuming power in the northern cities, improvised courts were established, which, on the basis of summary judgments, imposed death sentences on the captured fascists. In the two months following the insurrection, a considerable number of people were subjected to popular trials and executed, sometimes even without trial, for having been active in the Italian Social Republic, for having manifested fascist sympathies, or for having collaborated with the German authorities. The acts of summary justice against fascists and collaborationists, carried out in the days immediately following the end of the war, were locally tolerated by the allied commands:

"You clean up for two, three days, but on the third day I don't want to see dead people on the streets anymore."

— English colonel John Melior Stevens at the Piedmontese National Liberation Committee

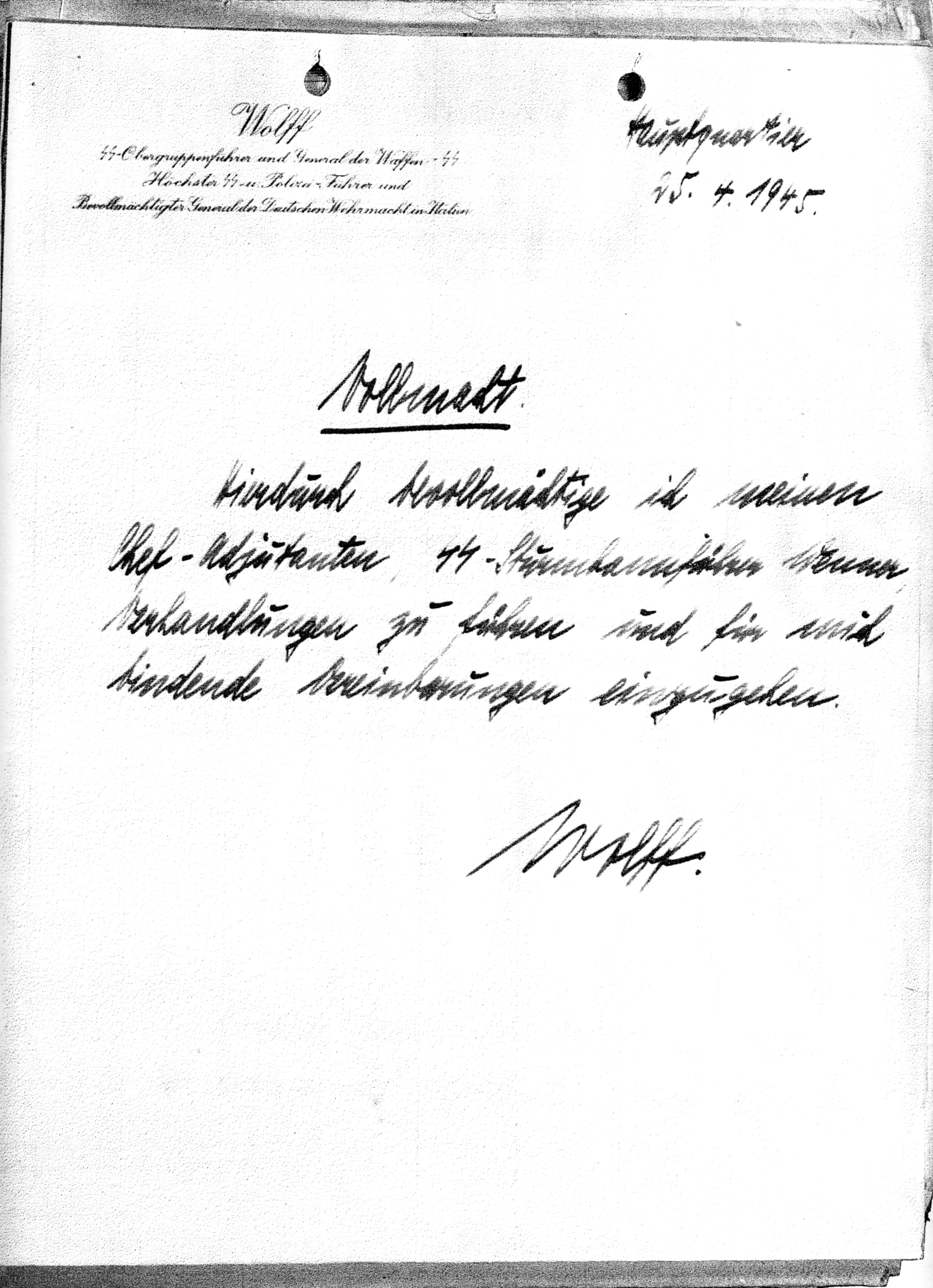
The surrender at Caserta, written agreement that formalized on 2 May 1945 the surrender of German and RSI forces in Italy, ending the Italian Campaign of World War II and the Italian Civil War.

The executions of the exponents of the Italian Social Republic took place quickly and with summary procedures also because - having ascertained the failure to renew the cadres of the old regime in royal Italy - the partisan leaders feared that the definitive transfer of powers to the Anglo-Americans and the return to "legality bourgeois" would have prevented a radical purge. This desire to speed up times is witnessed in a letter in which the shareholder Giorgio Agosti writes to party mate Dante Livio Bianco, commander of the Giustizia e Libertà formations, that "we need... before the Allied arrival, a San Bartolomeo of fascists that take away the desire to start over for a good number of years".

The death sentences for collaborationism in some cases also hit innocent people accused without evidence, as in the cases of the actors Elio Marcuzzo (of anti-fascist faith) and Luisa Ferida. In the climate of insurrectional violence, there were also murders linked to private events. In fact, the victims included not only personalities linked to the Republican Fascist Party, belonging to the armed departments of the Italian Social Republic (Black Brigades, National Republican Guard, Italian SS, etc.), and informers and collaborators, but also civil servants and public employees, priests, members of the bourgeoisie opposed to communism, simple citizens, and even adherents to partisan organizations (for example Giorgio Morelli), victims of radical proponents of the class struggle, but also of reckless profiteers and common criminals, who exploited the moment of confusion to pursue their own goals. On 24 June 1945, Ferruccio Parri harshly stigmatized these episodes in the course of the first radio message to Italians after his appointment as head of government:

And one more word for the arbitrary acts of justice, when they are not of revenge, and for the illegal executions that disturb some northern cities, compromise us with our allies and above all offend our spirit of justice. It is a specific invitation that I am giving you. Enough: and let the authentic partisans, vilified by these turbulent people who came out after the victory, be the ones who cooperate for the defense of the legality that our own revolution has given itself.

A bitter controversy has arisen in Italy since the postwar period on the actual dimensions of the post-war violence. The two extremes speak of 1,732 dead, according to then-minister Mario Scelba, and of three hundred thousand dead, according to various neo-fascist sources. More accurate scientific studies and testimonials have highlighted intermediate figures:

- Guido Crainz, based on an analysis of the various sources, including the police reports of 1946, indicates the figure of 9,364 killed or disappeared "for political reasons" as realistic, adding then - however - a long list of violence and killings of a real jacquerie character, according to the author only weakly connected to the events of the civil war, but rather tied to a long tradition of social clashes and "extreme, sectarian harshness", dating back to the previous century, or the return to an ancestral ferocity;
- according to the German scholar Hans Woller of the Ludwig-Maximilians-Universität München, the victims were 12,060 in 1945 and 6,027 in 1946;
- in an article published in 1997, the journalist Silvio Bertoldi claimed to have learned from Ferruccio Parri (during an interview with the latter which took place at an unspecified time) that the victims had been about 30,000;
- the veteran of the Italian Social Republic Giorgio Pisanò came to estimate the number of fascist deaths, or presumed such, at 48,000, including in the calculation the victims of the Foibe massacres in Istria and Dalmatia.

On 24 June 1952, during a parliamentary discussion relating to law no. 645/52 (which, many years later, was modified by the current Mancino Law), the Honorable Guglielmo Giannini revealed that he himself, through his own newspaper, spread what he called a "well-engineered lie" according to which the fascist dead would have been three hundred thousand:

It was I who spread the news of the 300,000 dead. I had the same newspaper I have now (...) And spread the news of these 300,000 dead, - fascists or presumed to be so -, with all the political effects that a news of such gravity could entail (...). This may suggest ironic considerations on the fortune of newspapers that as long as they publish stories find readers in the hundreds of thousands and when they publish the truth they see their number of readers drop.

— Guglielmo Giannini

In the book The Triangle of Death, the authors Giorgio Pisanò and Paolo Pisanò report the names of about 4,500 victims of the frenzy of execution that unleashed the fall of the Nazi-fascist regime in the area between Bologna, Ferrara and Modena, but Turin (1,138), Cuneo (426), Genoa (569), Savona (311), Imperia (274), Milan (610), Bergamo (247), Piacenza (250), Parma (206), Treviso (630 ), Udine (391), Asti (17), Tuscany (308), and Lazio (136) also had victims of the so-called showdown.

For several days, executions have taken place at dawn, away from the gaze of onlookers. [...] In the first days of liberation from the hated republican fascist expression, the bleeding heart of those who had been struck by the dearest affections asked for more blood and wanted to see it flow. The thing was explainable. After 48 hours of reaction, I had the impression that the mass no longer wanted the "public show". [...] It was then decided that the execution was carried out out of sight of the crowd.

— Gazzetta d'Asti, 4 May 1945

From an unsigned document of the Ministry of the Interior dated 4 November 1946 and which was not made public at the time, it appears that "the number of people killed, because they were politically compromised, is n. 8,197 while 1,167 were, for the same reason, withdrawn and presumably suppressed". According to Nazario Sauro Onofri, the initiative to compile this statistic came from then-Minister of the Interior Alcide De Gasperi, who, however, did not disclose the results of the investigation and did not even inform the other members of the government; the methods by which the Ministry obtained such total numbers are not known.

== Aftermath ==
Much like Japan and Germany, the aftermath of World War II left Italy with a destroyed economy, a divided society, and anger against the monarchy for its endorsement of the Fascist regime for the previous twenty years. These frustrations contributed to a revival of the Italian republican movement. Following Victor Emmanuel III's abdication, his son, the new king Umberto II, was pressured by the threat of another civil war to call a constitutional referendum to decide whether Italy should remain a monarchy or become a republic. On 2 June 1946, the republican side won 54% of the vote and Italy officially became a republic. All male members of the House of Savoy were barred from entering Italy, a ban which was only repealed in 2002. The Italian Republic remained under the control of Allied Military Government of Occupied Territories until the Treaty of Peace with Italy in 1947.

== See also ==
- Italian Armistice
- Italian Campaign (World War II)
- Italian Resistance movement
- Italian Social Republic

== Bibliography ==
- Battistelli, Pier Paolo; Crociani, Piero (2015). World War II Partisan Warfare in Italy. Bloomsbury Publishing Plc. ISBN 9781472808943.
- Becker, Josef; Knipping, Franz (1986). Great Britain, France, Italy and Germany in a Postwar World, 1945–1950. Walter de Gruyter. ISBN 9783110863918.
- Bocca, Giorgio (1995). Storia dell'Italia partigiana. Settembre 1943-maggio 1945 (in Italian). Mondadori. ISBN 88-04-40129-X.
- Bocca, Giorgio (2001). Storia dell'Italia partigiana settembre 1943 - maggio 1945 (in Italian). Mondadori. p. 39. ISBN 978-88-0717-2441 – via Google Books.
- Bocca, Giorgio (1994). La repubblica di Mussolini (in Italian). Mondadori. ISBN 88-04-38715-7.
- Bontempelli, Massimo (2006). La Resistenza Italiana (in Italian). CUEC. ISBN 978-88-8467-3183.
- Colombo, Arturo (1979). Partiti e ideologie del movimento antifascista in: Storia d'Italia, vol. 8 (in Italian). De Agostini.[ISBN unspecified]
- Crainz, Guido (2007). L'ombra della guerra. Il 1945, l'Italia (in Italian). Donzelli. ISBN 978-88-6036-160-8.
- De Felice, Renzo (1990). Mussolini l'alleato I. L'Italia in guerra 1940-1943. t. II, Crisi e agonia del regime (in Italian). Torino: Einaudi. ISBN 978-88-0624-7669.
- De Felice, Renzo (1997). Mussolini l'alleato II. La guerra civile 1943-1945 (in Italian). Torino: Einaudi. ISBN 88-06-11806-4.
- De Felice, Renzo (1995). Rosso e Nero [Red and Black] (in Italian). Baldini & Castoldi. ISBN 88-85987-95-8.
- De Felice, Renzo (1999). La resistenza ed il regno del sud, "Nuova storia contemporanea" [Resistance and the southern kingdom, "New contemporary history"]. Vol. 2. pp. 9–24 17.
- Dolfin, Giovanni (1949). Con Mussolini nella tragedia (in Italian). Garzanti.
- Gallerano, Nicola; Ganapini, Luigi; Legnani, Massimo, eds. (1969). L'Italia dei quarantacinque giorni. Milano: Istituto Nazionale per la Storia del Movimento di Liberazione in Italia.
- Ganapini, Luigi (2010) [1999]. Garzanti (ed.). La repubblica delle camicie nere. I combattenti, i politici, gli amministratori, i socializzatori (in Italian) (2a ed.). Milano. ISBN 978-88-11-69417-5.
- Gorrieri, Ermanno (1966). La Repubblica di Montefiorino. Per una storia della Resistenza in Emilia (in Italian). Il Mulino. ASIN B072ND6YP6.
- Ilari, Virgilio (1994). "Das Ende eines Mythos. Interpretationen und politische Praxis des italienischen Widerstands in der Debatte der frühen neunzinger Jahre". In P. Bettelheim; R. Streibl (eds.). Tabu und Geschichte. Zur Kultur des kollektiven Erinners (in German). Vienna: Picus Verlag. pp. 129–174. ISBN 978-38-545-2254-6.
- Klinkhammer, Lutz (2007). L'occupazione tedesca in Italia 1943-1945 (in Italian). Bollati Boringhieri. ISBN 978-88-339-1782-5.
- Lepre, Aurelio (1999). Mondadori (ed.). La storia della Repubblica di Mussolini. Salò: il tempo dell'odio e della violenza (in Italian). Milano. ISBN 88-04-45898-4.
- Luzzatto, Sergio (2014). The Body of Il Duce: Mussolini's Corpse and the Fortunes of Italy. Henry Holt and Company. ISBN 978-1-4668-8360-4.
- Meldi, Diego (2015). La repubblica di Salò. Gherardo Casini Editore. ISBN 978-88-6410-068-5.
- Montanelli, Indro; Cervi, Mario (1983). L'Italia della guerra civile (in Italian). Rizzoli.
- Moseley, Ray (2004). Mussolini: The Last 600 Days of Il Duce. Taylor Trade Publications. ISBN 978-1-58979-095-7.
- Oliva, Gianni (1998). I vinti e i liberati. 8 settembre 1943–25 aprile 1945. Storia di due anni (in Italian). Mondadori. ISBN 88-04-44851-2.
- Oliva, Gianni (1999). Mondadori (ed.). La resa dei conti. Aprile-maggio 1945: foibe, piazzale Loreto e giustizia partigiana (in Italian). Milano. ISBN 88-04-45696-5.
- Onofri, Nazario Sauro (2007). Il triangolo rosso. La guerra di liberazione e la sconfitta del fascismo (1943-1947) (in Italian). Sapere 2000. ISBN 978-88-7673-265-2.
- Osti Guerrazzi, Amedeo (2004). "La repubblica necessaria". Il fascismo repubblicano a Roma, 1943-1944 (in Italian). Franco Angeli. ISBN 88-464-5650-5.
- Pavone, Claudio (1991). Una guerra civile. Saggio storico sulla moralità della Resistenza (in Italian). Torino: Bollati Boringhieri. ISBN 88-339-0629-9.
- Pavone, Claudio (2006). A Civil War (in Italian). Bollati Boringhieri. ISBN 978-88-339-1676-7.
- Payne, Stanley G. (2011). Civil War in Europe, 1905-1949. Cambridge University Press. ISBN 9781139499644.
- Peli, Santo (2006). Storia della Resistenza in Italia (in Italian). Einaudi. ISBN 978-88-06-18092-8.
- Petacco, Arrigo (2002). Ammazzate quel fascista! Vita intrepida di Ettore Muti (in Italian). Milano: Mondadori. ISBN 8804506865.
- Picone Chiodo, Marco (1990). In nome della resa: l'Italia nella guerra, 1940-1945 (in Italian). Mursia. ISBN 88-425-0654-0.
- Pisanò, Giorgio (1965). Storia della Guerra Civile in Italia - 1943-45 (in Italian). Vol. I. FPE. ASIN B0170ERP3S.
- Rossi, Elena Aga; Smith, Bradley (2005). Operazione Sunrise. Mondadori. ISBN 978-88-0453-726-7.
- Mack Smith, Denis (1983). Mussolini: A Biography. New York: Vintage Books. ISBN 978-0394716589.
