= Mark Choate =

American historian

Mark I. Choate
- Awards: Howard R. Marraro Prize (2009)

Academic background
- Education: Yale University (Bachelor of Arts); Yale University (Master of Arts); Yale University (Master of Philosophy); Yale University (Ph.D.); U.S. Army War College (Master of Security Studies); United States Army Command and General Staff College
- Thesis: Defining “Greater Italy”: Migration and Colonialism in Africa and the Americas, 1880-1915 (2002)
- Doctoral advisor: Frank M. Snowden III
- Other advisors: Paul Kennedy, John M. Merriman, Geoffrey Parker (historian), Linda Colley

Academic work
- Notable students: Amy Reeder
- Main interests: International relations Military history
- Notable works: Emigrant Nation: The Making of Italy Abroad (2008)
- Notable ideas: Emigrant colonialism

Mark Irvan Choate FRHistS is an American academic and retired colonel and diplomat. He is a history professor at Brigham Young University and adjunct research professor at the Strategic Studies Institute, U.S. Army War College, specializing in international relations, the history of migration and colonialism, and grand strategy. He emphasizes the relationships between international emigration, immigration, and colonialism, and transnational influences in the fields of diplomacy, trade, currency exchange, and military power.

== Early life ==
After living in Pago Pago, American Samoa, and Pittsburgh, Pennsylvania, as a child, Choate grew up in rural Osage County, Oklahoma, and graduated from Charles Page High School in Sand Springs. While a freshman at Yale College, he enlisted as a medic in the 179th Infantry Regiment (United States), Army National Guard, using the G.I. Bill to help pay for school.

== Fellowships and memberships ==
He has been a Fellow of the Royal Historical Society since 2008, and a fellow of the Società Italiana per lo Studio della Storia Contemporanea since 2009. He was a visiting fellow at the Centre d'études et de recherches internationales at Sciences Po, Paris, in 2014–2015.

== Awards and Distinctions ==
2017: Daniel M. Lewin Cyber-Terrorism Technology Writing Award, U.S. Army War College
2009: Howard R. Marraro Prize
2010: Council for European Studies Book Award
2010: BYU Class of 1949 Young Faculty Award teaching prize
2002: Hans W. Gatzke Prize, Yale University
1998-1999: Fulbright Fellow in Italy

== Military service ==
Mark Choate
- Military career
- Allegiance: United States of America
- Branch: United States Army
- Rank: Colonel
- Conflicts: War in Afghanistan; Insurgency in the Maghreb
- Awards: Bronze Star; Legion of Merit; Defense Meritorious Service Medal; Meritorious Service Medal

Choate enlisted in 1989 as a Private first class in the Oklahoma National Guard. He completed basic training at Fort Jackson and advanced individual training as a medic at Fort Sam Houston. Choate ended his enlistment at the rank of staff sergeant upon being commissioned as a mustang officer through Officer Candidate School in 1994.

As a United States defense attaché, he served in United States embassies in Khartoum, Sudan; Bangui, Central African Republic; and N'Djamena, Chad.

=== Dates of rank ===
Promotions
Rank	Date
Second Lieutenant	1994
First Lieutenant	1997
Captain	2001
Major	2007
Lieutenant Colonel	2013
Colonel	2018

=== Decorations and badges ===
Choate's decorations and badges include the following:

U.S. military decorations
Legion of Merit
Bronze Star
Defense Meritorious Service Medal (with Oak Leaf Cluster)
Meritorious Service Medal
Joint Service Commendation Medal (with Oak Leaf Cluster)
Army Commendation Medal (with 3 Oak Leaf Clusters)
Army Achievement Medal (with 2 Oak Leaf Clusters)
U.S. unit awards
Joint Meritorious Unit Award (with Oak Leaf Cluster)
U.S. service (campaign) medals and service and training ribbons
Army Reserve Component Achievement Medal (with Silver and 4 Bronze Oak Leaf Clusters)
National Defense Service Medal (with 1 Service star)
Afghanistan Campaign Medal (with 1 Service Star)
Global War on Terrorism Expeditionary Medal
Global War on Terrorism Service Medal
Armed Forces Service Medal
Armed Forces Reserve Medal with Gold Hourglass and "M" Devices
Army Service Ribbon
Army Overseas Service Ribbon (with award numeral 2)
Army Reserve Component Overseas Service Ribbon (with award numeral 6)
International decorations
NATO Medal for ISAF Afghanistan Operation Enduring Freedom XVI
German Armed Forces Badge for Military Proficiency Gold

U.S. badges, patches and tabs
Army Staff Identification Badge
Special Forces (United States Army), 3rd Special Forces Group (United States) worn as his Combat Service Identification Badge
179th Infantry Regiment Distinctive Unit Insignia
1 Overseas Service Bar

== Works ==
- Emigrant Nation: The Making of Italy Abroad (Harvard University Press, 2008) ISBN 978-0-6740-2784-8
- Italianos no mundo: uma nação emigrante (Contexto, 2023, translated by João Fábio Bertonha) ISBN 978-6-5554-1280-2
- “Liberal Economics or Racial Exclusion: Competing Political and Cultural Narratives in Italian-American Transatlantic Migration,” in “Managing Migration in Italy and the United States” (Berlin and Boston: De Gruyter, 2024) ISBN 978-3110996289
- “Emigrazione italiana, rimesse e ascesa del « made in Italy »,” in “Storia degli italoamericani” (Milan: Le Monnier Mondadori, 2019) ISBN 978-8800749350
- "Italian Emigration, Remittances, and the Rise of Made-in-Italy,” in “The Routledge History of the Italian Americans” (New York/London: Routledge, 2018) ISBN 978-0367230937
- “The Frontier Thesis in Transnational Migration: The U.S. West in the Making of Italy Abroad,” in “Immigrants in the Far West: Historical Identities and Experiences” (Salt Lake City: University of Utah Press, 2015) ISBN 978-1607813798
- "New Dynamics and New Imperial Powers, 1876-1905," in The Routledge History of Western Empires (Oxford/New York: Routledge, 2014) ISBN 978-0-4156-3987-3
- "Identity Politics and Political Perception in the European Settlement of Tunisia: The French Colony vs. the Italian Colony". French Colonial History (Fall 2007): 97–109.
- "Italy at Home and Abroad after 150 Years: The Legacy of Emigration and the Future of Italianità". Italian Culture (May 2012): 51–67.
- "National Communications for a Transnational Community: Italy's promotion of italianità among emigrants, 1870-1920," in Transnational Political Spaces: Agents - Structures - Encounters (Frankfurt/New York: Campus Verlag, 2009) ISBN 978-3-5933-8945-5
- Choate, Mark I. (2010). "Tunisia, Contested: Italian Nationalism, French Imperial Rule, and Migration in the Mediterranean Basin". California Italian Studies (February 2010): 1–20. doi:10.5070/C311008861.
- "Sending States' Transnational Interventions in Politics, Culture, and Economics: The Historical Example of Italy". International Migration Review (Fall 2007): 728–768.
- "Identity Politics and Political Perception in the European Settlement of Tunisia: The French Colony vs. the Italian Colony". French Colonial History (Fall 2007): 97–109. JSTOR 41938170.
- "From Territorial to Ethnographic Colonies and Back Again: The Politics of Italian Expansion, 1890-1912". Modern Italy (Spring 2003): 65–75.
