= Togliatti amnesty =

1946 amnesty in Italy

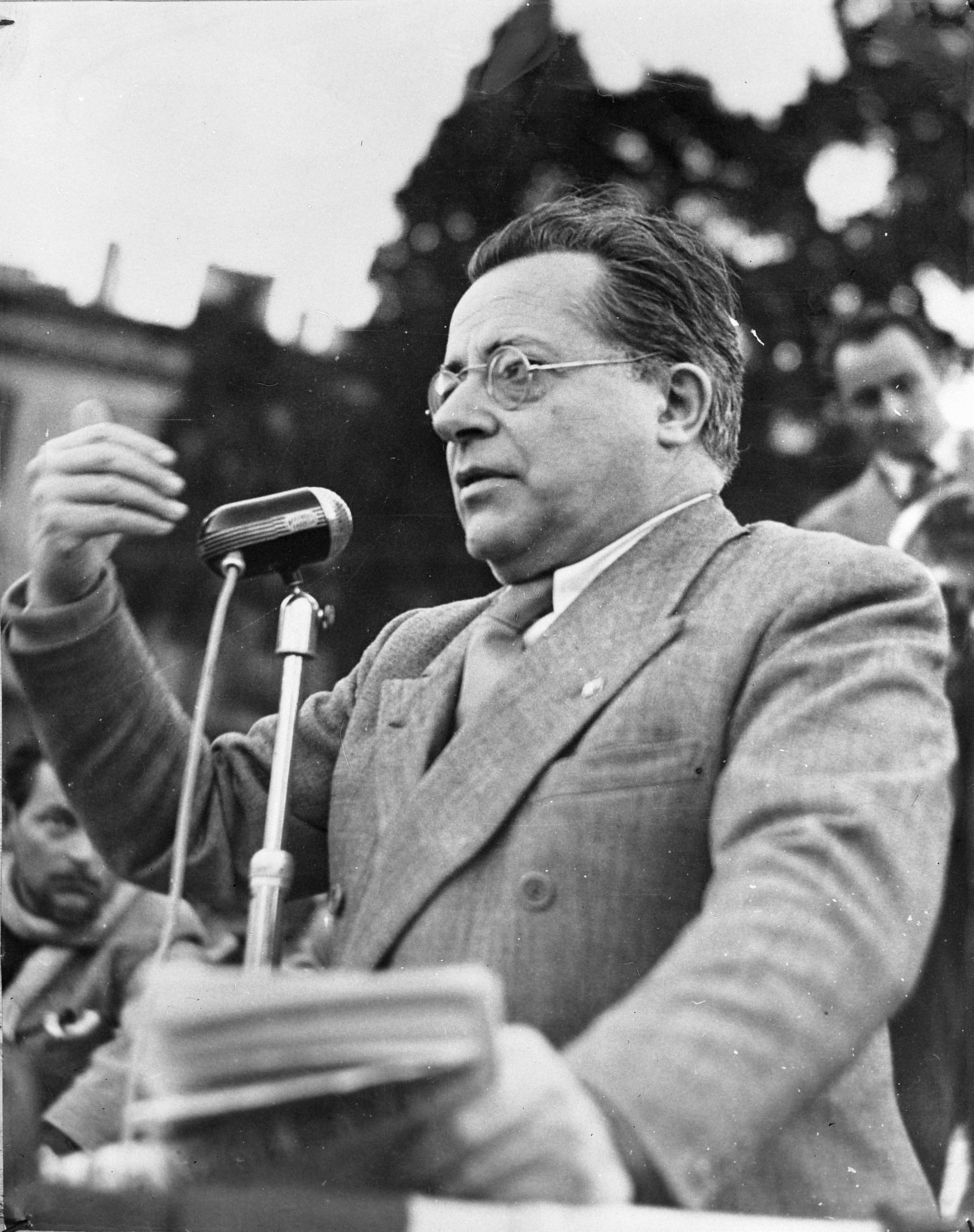
Palmiro Togliatti, the then-Italian Minister of Justice who declared the amnesty

The Togliatti amnesty (Italian: Amnistia Togliatti) was an amnesty declared in Italy on 22 June 1946. Named after the then-Italian Minister of Justice, Italian Communist Party (PCI) member and leader Palmiro Togliatti, it pardoned and reduced sentences for Italian fascists and partisans alike. The amnesty covered common crimes as well as political ones committed during World War II. Fascists and their collaborators benefited more from the amnesty than the partisans.

== Background ==
The Italian Civil War, from 8 September 1943 to 2 May 1945, had ended with the German surrender. During this time, the Italian resistance movement had fought German occupation forces and their Fascist Italian allies, the Italian Social Republic. It has been estimated that during this period 22,000 Italian civilians were killed through Axis war crimes in Italy, and 30,000 Italian partisans died in the fighting. Beside widespread crimes committed by the German occupying army and the Italian Fascists, the Italian partisans also committed acts that were considered crimes under Italian law. In particular, partisan forces killed some fascist supporters as well as soldiers who were held as prisoners of war.

In June 1946, the Kingdom of Italy was abolished through the 1946 Italian institutional referendum. To mark this event, a general amnesty was proposed and Togliatti was responsible for drafting the law. Togliatti was Minister of Justice from 25 July 1945 to 1 July 1946 within the government of the then Prime Minister of Italy, Alcide De Gasperi. The decree went through two drafts and was approved on 22 June 1946 by the Constituent Assembly of Italy. The amnesty was considered necessary for the rebuilding of the Italian nation after the war, and for the unity of the country. On a practical note, the Italian prison system was overcrowded, holding 80,000 inmates in early 1946, twice as many as a decade earlier. Among those, 12,000 were Fascists and partisans.

== Amnesty ==
The text of the amnesty was a compromise between the PCI and Christian Democracy (DC). In order to achieve their goal, the DC had to compromise and allow the amnesty to include the partisans. The amnesty consisted of 16 clauses and a foreword by Togliatti. The cut-off date for the amnesty was 31 July 1945, whereas crimes committed after this date were not pardoned.

With regard to Fascist crimes, the amnesty excluded high-ranking officials, crimes committed for material gain, or carried out with excessive cruelty. The exclusion engendered controversy for it did not include rape or sexual torture, which were still pardonable. The amnesty commuted death sentences to life imprisonment, life imprisonment to 30 years and reduced all sentences above five years by two-thirds. Paradoxically, the amnesty led to an increase in prosecution of partisan crimes, while Fascist crimes were treated more leniently. In practice, the Fascists and collaborators benefited far more from the amnesty than imprisoned partisans, who were treated as common criminals.

The amnesty was positively received by the Allied Force Headquarters in Italy. Later less publicised pardons and releases on parole between 1947 and 1953, further reduced sentences for political crimes committed during the war.
