= Alfredo Malgeri =

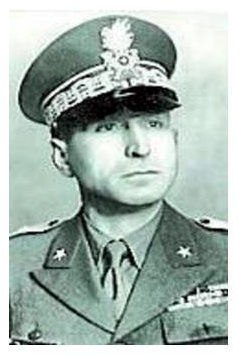
- Born: 14 August 1892; Reggio Calabria, Kingdom of Italy
- Died: 10 June 1977 (aged 84); Milan, Italy
- Military career
- Allegiance: Kingdom of Italy; Italy
- Branch: Guardia di Finanza
- Rank: General
- Conflicts: World War II
- Awards: Order of Merit of the Italian Republic

Alfredo Malgeri (14 August 1892 – 10 June 1977) was an officer in the Italian Guardia di Finanza and Resistance member during World War II.

== Biography ==
During the late 1930s Malgeri and the early stages of World War II, with the rank of colonel, commanded the 11th Territorial G.d.F. Legion "Salentina", stationed in Apulia. Later in the war he became the commander of the 3rd Legion of the Guardia di Finanza stationed in Milan. After the Armistice of Cassibile the Legion remained at its post, ostensibly passing under the control of the Italian Social Republic, but Malgeri established secret contacts with the National Liberation Committee and started secretly providing them with weapons, ammunition and false documents, while rejecting Fascist demands to employ his men to hunt down partisans and Jews trying to cross the border with Switzerland.

In April 1945 Malgeri made arrangements with General Raffaele Cadorna jr, one of the leaders of the Resistance in Lombardy, to support the partisans in the general insurrection; in the night between 25 and 26 April 1945, following the beginning of the insurrection of Milan, he received from Leo Valiani the order to seize the Prefecture of Milan and, if possible, storm the headquarters of the Republican National Guard, the Decima Flottiglia MAS and the "Ettore Muti" Autonomous Mobile Legion, as well as helping the workers to protect the city's main factories (Breda, Pirelli, Officine Meccaniche, Borletti) from German sabotage attempts. Malgeri's twenty-three officers and 407 men went into action and by six in the morning of 26 April they occupied the seat of the Prefecture, followed by the headquarters of the provincial government, the town hall, the headquarters of the Republican Military Command and the radio station. Only sporadic clashes took place, as most Fascist troops had meanwhile fled north or disbanded. At eight o'clock, as agreed, Malgeri sounded the air raid alarm three times, to announce that Milan had been liberated, and at 8:30 Riccardo Lombardi, the new prefect designated by the CLNAI, was able to take possession of the Prefecture. On 6 May Malgeri's men, the only Italian regular troops in the city, were reviewed by General Willis D. Crittenberger, commander of the 4th US Army Corps, who had arrived in Milan on 30 April.

After the war, Malgeri was promoted to General and awarded the Order of Merit of the Italian Republic and the Guardia di Finanza Gold Medal for Valor. He died in Milan in 1977, and was buried in the Cimitero Monumentale.
