= Nuto Revelli =

Italian partisan (1919–2004)

Benvenuto "Nuto" Revelli (21 July 1919, Cuneo, Piedmont – 5 February 2004) was an Italian author, historian and partisan. A Second World War veteran who survived Italy's disastrous foray into Russian territory and its subsequent retreat, Revelli became well known for his book Mai Tardi about the ordeal. For his book Il mondo dei vinti (The World of the Defeated), he collected oral history accounts of 85 country dwellers around Cuneo in northwestern Italy.

== Life ==
Revelli was a freshly commissioned second lieutenant when, on 21 July 1942, he left Italy on one of the two hundred troop trains sent to the Eastern Front by Mussolini as the Italian Army in Russia (ARMIR). On 19 September 1942 Revelli was wounded in an action which earned him a Silver Medal of Military Valor and a promotion to lieutenant, returning to the frontline after recovering in the hospital of Dnepropetrovsk. Between mid-December 1942 and mid-January 1943, the Red Army broke through the Italian lines on the Don in Operation Little Saturn, encircling the Alpine Army Corps of which Revelli's 2nd Alpine Division "Tridentina" was part. During the subsequent retreat, tens of thousands of men fell in combat to break out of the pocket, succumbed to frostbite and exhaustion, or were captured and died in Soviet captivity.

For Revelli, who survived the winter retreat and returned to Italy in the spring of 1943, the experience was a formative one. In it he claimed to have lost what he called his ignorance of the nature of the regime he was serving, of the iniquity of the German ally, and of the extent to which his own youth, coinciding nearly exactly with the twenty years of fascism, had been shaped by fascism. From very shortly after 8 September 1943—the date on which the Italian armistice with the Allies was announced—to the end of the war, Revelli was a partisan commander, first in the Alpine valleys west of Cuneo, Italy, then across the border in southeastern France.

Revelli's first book, among the first accounts of the retreat from Russia, was Mai tardi. La strada del davai collects the wartime memories of some forty veterans of the Eastern Front. Many of Revelli's other books—oral histories—explore the effects of post-war industrialization on the rural economies of the province of Cuneo. Despite the great importance of his literary and historical work, Revelli was never an academic or a professional historian; by training, as he often said, he was a surveyor. He was also an iron products dealer.

In a poem titled "To Mario and Nuto," Primo Levi, one of Revelli's great friends, writes: “I have two brothers with lots of life behind them, / Born in the shadow of the mountains. / They learned indignation / in the snows of a distant land, / And they’ve written non-useless books. / Like me, they have borne the sight / Of Medusa, who didn’t turn them to stone. / They haven’t let themselves be turned to stone / By the slow flurry of the days.”

== Works ==
- Mai tardi
- La guerra dei poveri
- La strada del davai
- Il mondo dei vinti
- L'ultimo fronte
- L'anello forte
- Il disperso di Marburg
- Il prete giusto
- Le due guerre

In English

- Mussolini's Death March: Eyewitness Accounts of Italian Soldiers on the Eastern Front, trans. John Penuel (translation of La strada del davai), Univ. Press of Kansas, 2013.
