= A Civil War =

1991 book by Claudio Pavone

A Civil War: A History of the Italian Resistance
- 1991 edition
- Author: Claudio Pavone
- Original title: Una guerra civile. Saggio storico sulla moralità nella Resistenza
- Translator: Peter Levy
- Subject: Italian armed resistance
- Genre: History
- Published: 1991
- Publisher: Bollati Boringhieri, Verso Books
- English publication date: 2013

A Civil War is a history of the Italian resistance movement by Claudio Pavone, first published in 1991. The author, a former partisan, analyses the resistance in multiple aspects, focusing on the motivations, behaviour, expectations and objectives of partisans themselves. The work is an attempt to shift the historiographic focus from the overtly political, in which the parties are agents and at the centre of history, to ethics, that is, analysing subjective motivations, aspirations, delusions and hopes within the partisan movement. Pavone's book significantly shaped historical debates relating to the Resistance and to the crucial period between the armistice of Cassibile and Italian liberation.

The work proposes that the period be considered as three simultaneous wars: "patriotic" against the German invader, "civil" between Italian fascists and anti-fascists, and "class" between revolutionary and bourgeois. Although contentious upon publication, the work is considered to have facilitated a wider acceptance that the events of 1943-45 should be considered as a civil war rather than, as in the previously dominant understanding, a war of liberation.

Mark Mazower of Columbia University, called A Civil War a "great work" and "among the few indisputable masterpieces of contemporary history." David Ellwood, in the English Historical Review, noted, "Pavone’s book will always remain as the outstanding monument to the Resistance movement in its philosophical and political dimensions."

== Editions ==
=== In Italian ===
- Pavone, Claudio (1991). Una guerra civile: saggio storico sulla moralità nella Resistenza (in Italian). Torino: Bollati Boringhieri. ISBN 8833906299. OCLC 797565709.
- Pavone, Claudio (2013). Una guerra civile: saggio storico sulla moralità nella Resistenza (in Italian). Torino: Bollati Boringhieri. ISBN 978-8833970134. OCLC 955087397.

=== In English ===
- Pavone, Claudio (2013). Stanislao Pugliese (ed.). A Civil War: A History Of The Italian Resistance. Translated by Peter Levy, David Broder. London: Verso Books. ISBN 978-1781682364. OCLC 1051804248.
