= Battle of Monte Battaglia =

1944 engagement in Emilia-Romagna, Italy

Date	24 September – 11 October 1944
Location	Monte Battaglia
Result	Allied victory

Belligerents
United States; United Kingdom; Brigate Garibaldi	Germany; Italian Social Republic

The Battle of Monte Battaglia occurred on 24 September 1944, when a partisan battalion of the 36th Garibaldi Brigade, with 250 men divided into six companies, operating in the Imola and Faenza Apennines, began an infiltration movement that led it to occupy Monte Battaglia on the morning of 27 September. On the same morning, a group of partisans engaged the German units defending the summit of Mount Carnevale. After the encounter, on the afternoon of the 27 September the Americans were driven to Mt. Battaglia. The mountain had already hosted a nucleus of partisans and draft dodgers in the winter of 1943, but had not been deemed a cause for concern by the fascists.

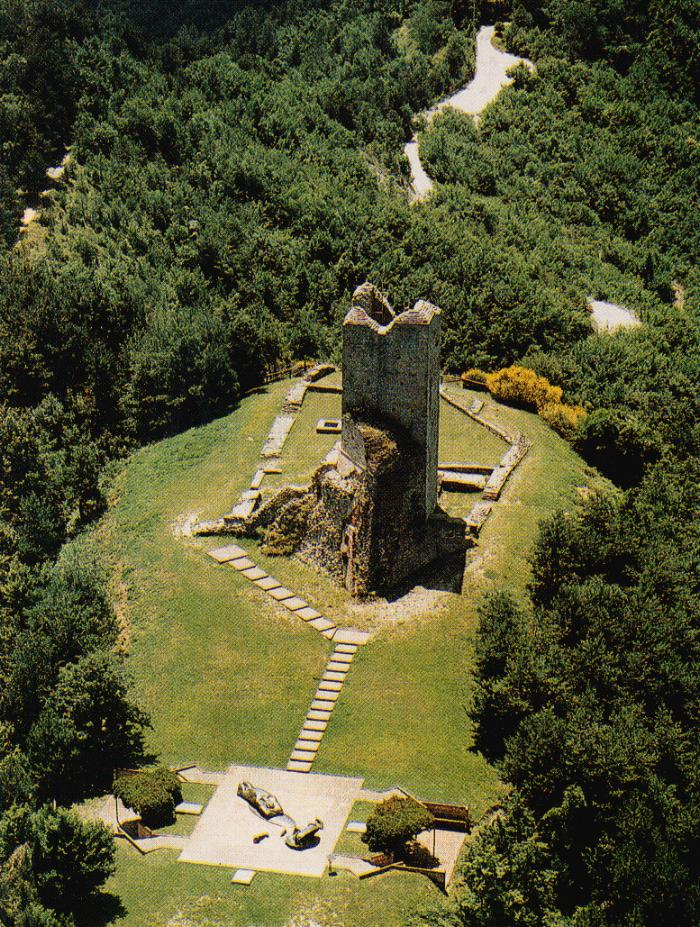
Aerial view of the fortress of Monte Battaglia

The fighting continued for another five days, but the Germans, despite reinforcements called up from the Adriatic front and help also obtained from forces of the Republic of Salò were again pushed back with heavy losses. The fighting sustained by the partisan brigade alongside the U.S. Army was an episode of high strategic and military value as part of the liberation of Italy from the Nazi-Fascists. The 350th regiment of the 88th division took the name "Mount Battaglia".

As a result of the fighting and the intense use of artillery, the remains of the fortress of Mount Battaglia were destroyed: only a trunk of the tower and a spur of the city wall remained, which then collapsed immediately after the war.

The final Allied offensive was launched in April 1945. The Senio valley was liberated by the "Friuli" Combat Group, framed in the British 10th Army Corps. For the sacrifices of its people and its activity in the partisan struggle, Casola Valsenio was awarded the War Cross of Military Valor.
