= Claudio Pavone =

Italian historian and archivist

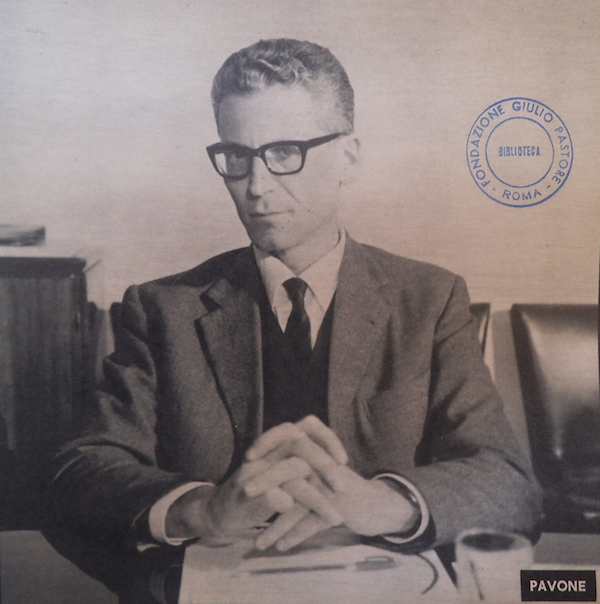
Claudio Pavone c. 1965

Claudio Pavone (30 November 1920 – 29 November 2016) was an Italian historian and archivist.

Pavone was the president of the Historic Institute of the Liberation movement in Italy, the president of the Italian Society of Contemporary History and the director of the historical journal Parolechiave (Keywords). He died aged 95, just one day shy of his 96th birthday.

== Biography ==
=== The partisan experience ===
During the Second World War, Pavone was enlisted as customs guard in Malles, near the Italian-Swiss frontier and far from the war front. From autumn 1943 until the end of the war he participated in the Italian resistance movement. This experience, as well as informing his civil conscience and political vision, also influenced his activity as a historian, both with regard to his chosen field of research and the way in which he analysed it.

After the war he worked as an archivist in the Italian National Archives. He played a central role in the organization of the Italian Central State Archive and in the draft of the general guide to the Italian Archives.

=== Works ===
Pavone published, for Bollati Boringhieri, Alle Origini della Repubblica (On the Origins of the Republic), an historical analysis of the route that led from the demise of the fascist regime, 25 July 1943, to the advent of the Republic on 2 June 1946 .

In 1991 he published Una Guerra Civile (A Civil War), an analysis of the origins, the motivations and intentions that underpinned the fight between fascist and antifascist Italy . The book is an important milestone in Italian historiography because it introduced in the academic debate the notion that the struggle that took place in 1943-45 between Italian fascists and the partisan movement was indeed a civil war. Before the publication of Una Guerra Civile the expression was only used, apologetically, by the Italian far right. An English translation of this work, published by Verso in 2013, appeared under the title "A Civil War - A History of the Italian Resistance".
