= Società Italiana per lo Studio della Storia Contemporanea =

- Abbreviation: SISSCO
- Type: Professional and cultural
- Purpose: To promote the historical studies on the contemporary era in Italy
- Location: Italy
- Members: 700+
- President: Fulvio Cammarano

The Società Italiana per lo Studio della Storia Contemporanea (Italian Society for the study of contemporary history - SISSCO) is a non-profit organization founded in 1990 in order to promote the progress of contemporary history studies in Italy and their scientific, academic and civil importance. In Italy the expression "contemporary history" indicates the period between the end of the eighteenth century and today.

The society is composed exclusively by scholars specializing in Modern and Contemporary History. At the end of 2017 the association counted more than 700 paying members.

== Activities ==
SISSCO regularly organizes seminars and conferences in Italy. Of particular importance among the latter are the Cantieri di Storia Sissco (Sissco History Building Sites), that gathers every two years hundreds of historians, the Workshop Nazionale Dottorandi (National PhD workshop), a yearly meeting dedicated to Italian history PhDs and Percorsi di Storia (Paths of History), a seminar on Italian historiography.

The society also awards two literary prizes: the Premio Sissco for the best contemporary history book of the previous year written by an Italian author; and the Premio ANCI-Storia, for books about local history, local identity and local government.

The society edits an online calendar that summarizes the contemporary history initiatives that take place in Italy as well as a calendar dedicated to call for papers,

Twice a year SISSCO publishes a journal, Il Mestiere di Storico, (The Historian's Craft), mostly dedicated to reviews of history books.

== Organs ==
=== Directive Board ===
SISSCO's Directive board is composed by the President and six members. The president keeps his post for four years. Every year two new Directive board members are elected After the 2017 elections the Directive board members are Maurizio Ridolfi and Simona Merlo elected in 2015, Antonio Bonatesta and Daniela Saresella elected in 2016, Gabriella Gribaudi and Federico Mazzini elected in 2017.

=== Presidents ===
Nr.	Presidente	Anno inizio	Anno fine
1	Luciano Cafagna	1990	1992
2	Paolo Pombeni	1992	1995
3	Claudio Pavone	1995	1999
4	Raffaele Romanelli	1999	2003
5	Tommaso Detti	2003	2007
6	Andrea Graziosi	2007	2011
7	Agostino Giovagnoli	2011	2015
8	Fulvio Cammarano	2015	2019
