= Alfredo Pizzoni =

Italian banker and politician

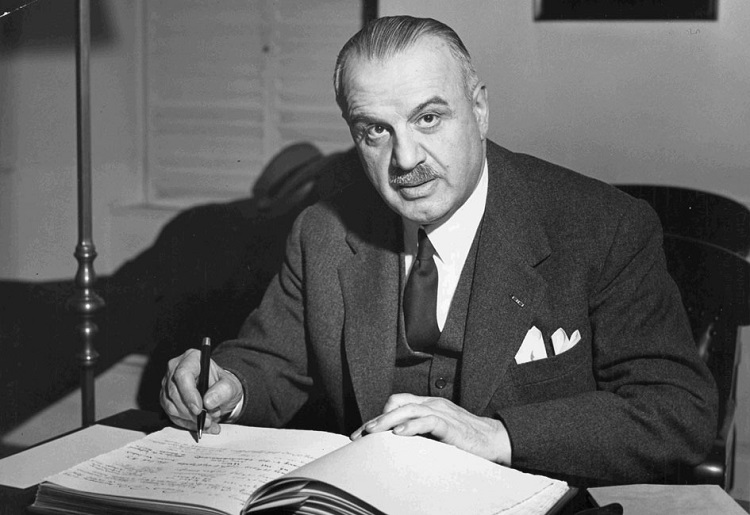
Pizzoni c. 1945

Alfredo Pizzoni (February 20, 1894 – January 3, 1958) was an Italian banker and politician who was president of the Comitato di Liberazione Nazionale Alta Italia (National Liberation Committee of Northern Italy, CLNAI) during the late stages of World War II.

== Biography ==
Pizzoni was born in Cremona and studied at London, Oxford and Pavia. During World War I he fought as a Bersaglieri officer, being awarded a silver medal for military value.

Subsequently, he worked as a banker for the Credito Italiano. After the rise of the Fascist regime, he became a member of the Giustizia e Libertà movement. During World War II he fought again in the Bersaglieri corps, receiving another medal, before being sent back home for health reasons in 1942.

He was elected president of Lombardy's Comitato di Liberazione Nazionale (later CLNAI) after the Armistice with Italy of September 8, 1943. Replaced by Rodolfo Morandi on April 27, 1945, Pizzoni returned to his bank job. He later was appointed President of Credito Italiano.

He died in Milan in 1958.
