= National Liberation Committee for Northern Italy =

Italian resistance organization, 1944–1945

Flag of the Italian resistance movement

The Committee of National Liberation for Northern Italy (Italian: Comitato di Liberazione Nazionale Alta Italia, CLNAI) was set up in February 1944 by partisans behind German lines in the Italian Social Republic, a German puppet state in Northern Italy. It enjoyed the loyalty of most anti-fascist groups in the region.

== History ==
In Milan, a September 1944 meeting decided a northern National Liberation Committee, within the Italian Social Republic that was established in 1943, was important. National Liberation Committee (CLN) leaders of Rome led by Bonomi recognized in January 1944 the need for coordination of the partisan struggle in the north and then the delegates were the Committee of Milan all political and military powers for Upper Italy, despite some disagreement with the Committee of Turin. Directed by independent Alfredo Pizzoni ("Longhi"), the committee became CLNAI Milan (National Liberation Committee for Northern Italy) and the rest of the Resistance led effectively to the partisan struggle in the heart of the Republic of the military and against the Germans.

=== Members ===
The initial members of Milan's CLN, which would later become CLNAI were:

- Alfredo Pizzoni, as president
- Girolamo Li Causi and Giuseppe Dozza, representing the Italian Communist Party
- Ferruccio Parri and Vittorio Albasini Scrosati, representing the Action Party
- Roberto Verratti and Domenico Viotto, representing the Italian Socialist Party
- Enrico Casò and Enrico Falck, representing the Christian Democracy
- Giustino Arpesani and Luigi Casagrande, representing the Italian Liberal Party

The composition changed over time. At the time of the general insurrection of 25 April 1945, the members were:

- Roberto Morandi, a Socialist, as president
- Luigi Longo and Emilio Sereni for the Communist Party
- Parri and Leo Valiani for the Action Party
- Sandro Pertini for the Socialist Party
- Augusto De Gasperi and Achille Marazza for the Christian Democracy
- Arpesani and Filippo Jacini for the Liberal Party

=== Functions ===
The role of CLNAI grew in importance during the war, after the delegation of powers to the north of Rome CLN obtained by 31 January 1944, last on 26 December 1944 as the government of national unity Bonomi gave the powers of direction in northern Italy to CLNAI, thus effectively assumed the role of "third-party government" or "shadow government" in the occupied territories.

Organized as a "government of the great North", the CLNAI managed to maintain cohesion among the different political positions, and maintained the relationship, sometimes difficult, with the Allies. It dealt with the problem of financing guerrilla warfare (especially tasks undertaken by Pizzoni and Falck) through a network connection with Switzerland. It also concluded cooperation agreements with the French Resistance and Yugoslav Resistance.

== See also ==
- ANPI
- Anti-fascism
- Arditi del Popolo
- Giustizia e Libertà
- Italian Partisan Republics
