= Pisa Village =

Humanitarian housing project in Italy

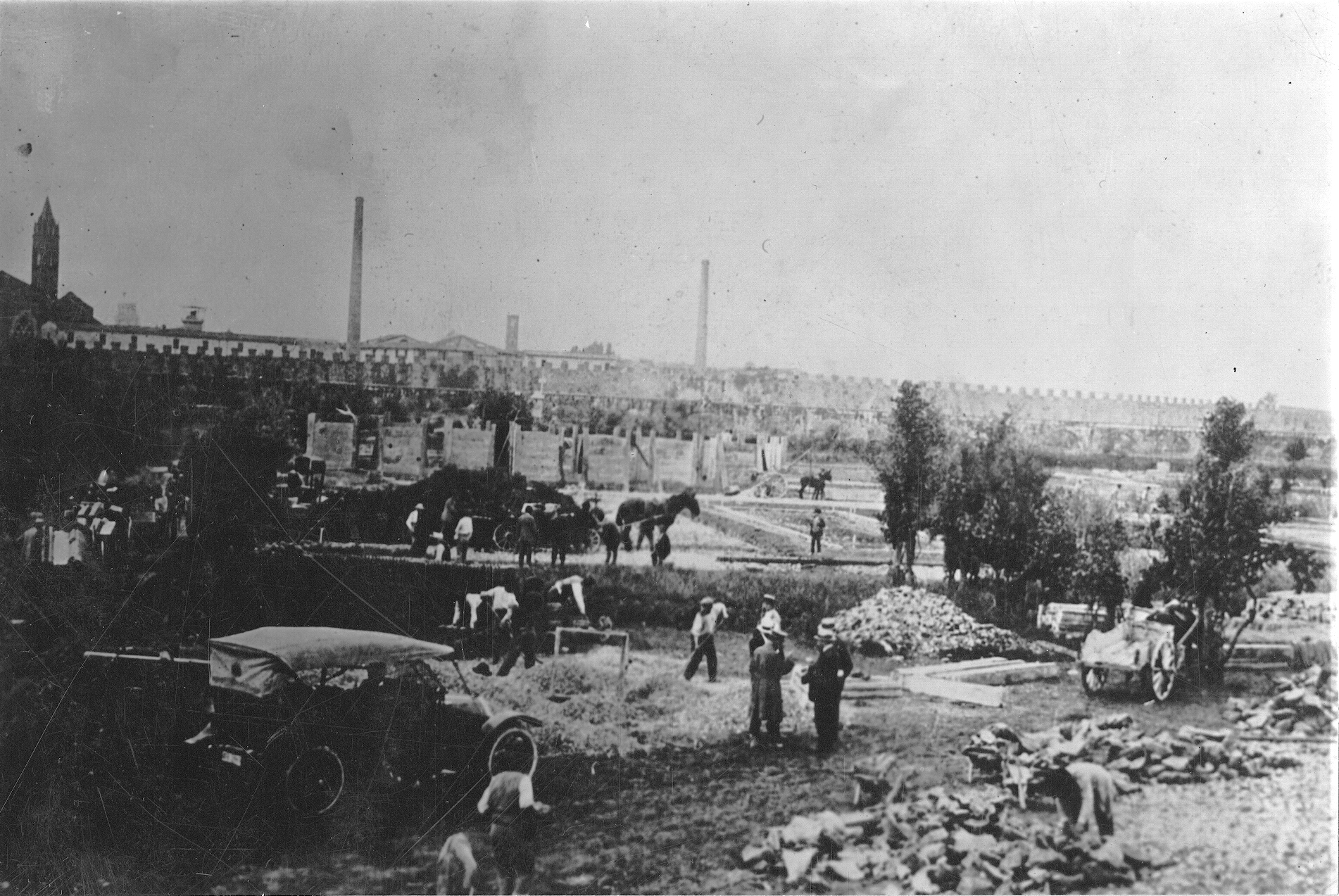
Constructing the American Red Cross concrete village at Pisa, Italy

The Pisa Village was a humanitarian housing project in Italy partially completed by the American Red Cross (ARC) during World War I.

== History ==
The refugee situation following the Battle of Caporetto provoked an American concern of disorder and unrest. Members of the ARC commission sympathized with the Italian families who had become refugees, whilst others feared the disaster’s potential to create a "moral hazard to young girls" and the opportunity for socialism to take root. In late February 1918, B. Harvey Carroll, the U.S. consul in Venice, proposed that the ARC should construct a model village near Pisa for 15,000 Venetians.

The plan was scaled down by the ARC to 2,000. The planned village included eighty concrete homes, offices, shops, a community kitchen, a church, workrooms, school, a hospital, and a concrete replica of the Piazza San Marco.

The village was advertised separately to American and Italian audiences. For Italians, the ARC presented the village as a stable environment where families could support themselves through employment rather than charity. The ARC marketed the Pisa Village to Americans as a "modern American city". The designers followed contemporary notions of hygienic housing, reflecting the work of reformers of immigrant housing in the United States. Carroll and the ARC viewed the project both as a solution to the refugee crisis and as a "concrete example of what America can do when she bows her neck to it". The Pisa Village was envisioned as a testament to the ARC and United States' innovative approach to disaster relief, and as a model for Italians to follow.

The sudden end of the war following the November 1918 Armistice meant the project was never fully completed despite the laudatory depictions within the IW Cross Magazine and Bulletin that implied otherwise. The village was turned over to the Italian Commission to the Ministry of War, to provide housing to wounded soldiers. Designed to venerate the United States' role in preserving Italian communities, the project was representative of the ARC and United States' increasingly international humanitarianism.

== Gallery ==
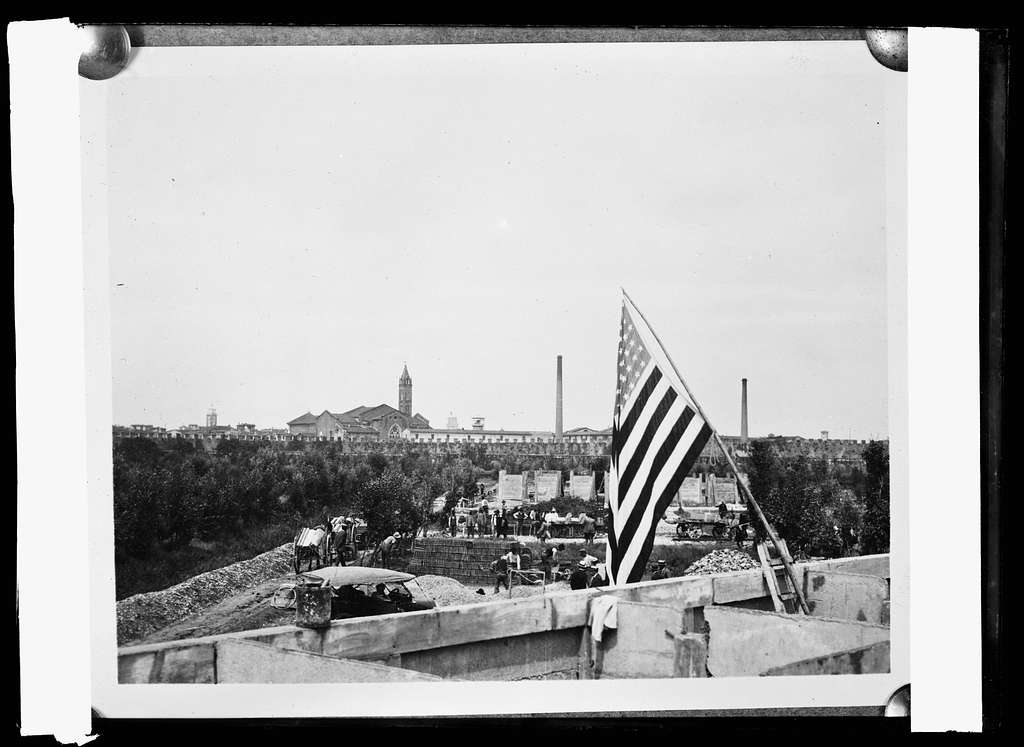
The American Red Cross at work on the grounds, with the leaning tower in the distance.

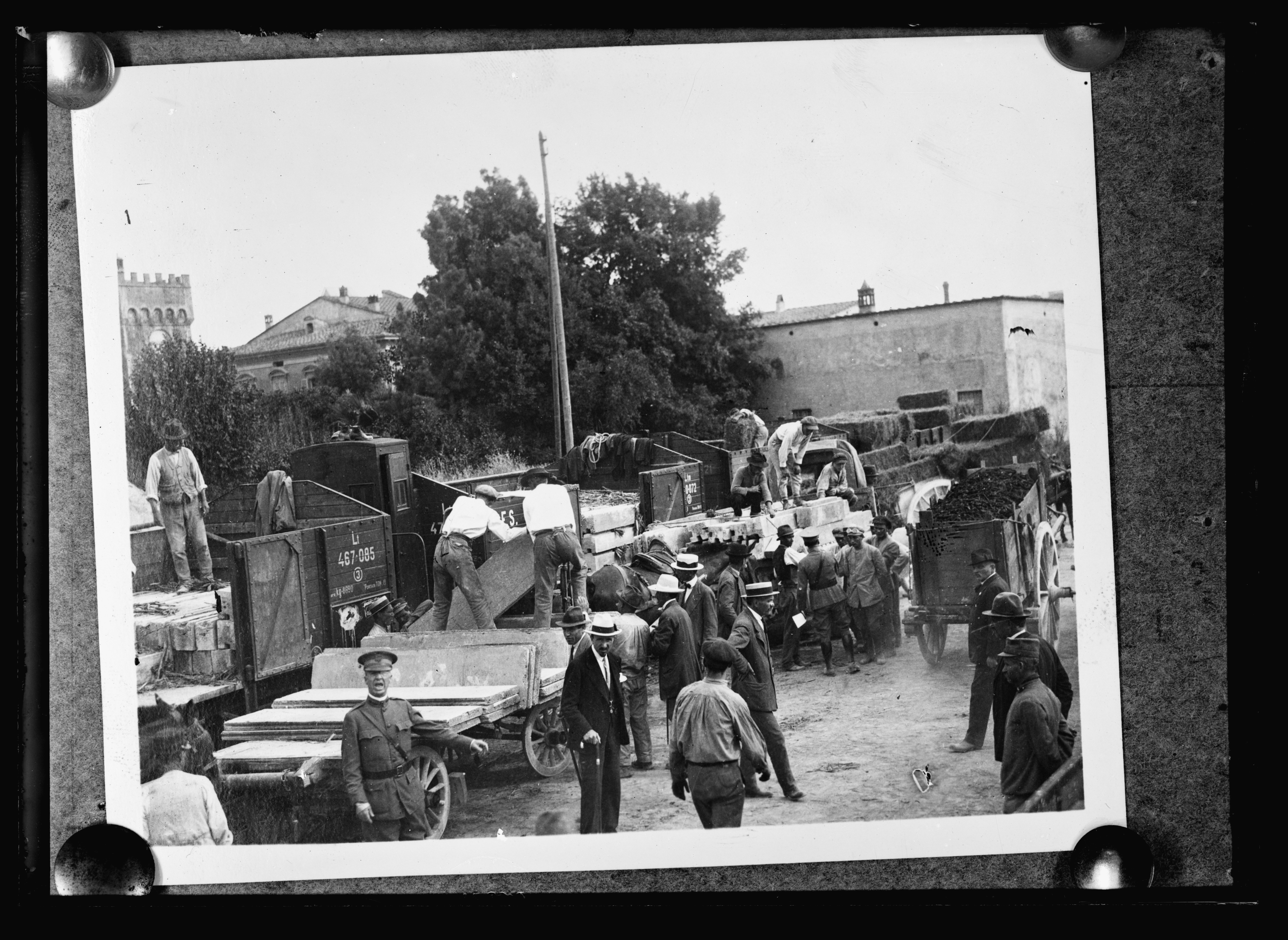
Workers taking cement slabs from railway station to the ARC village at Pisa.

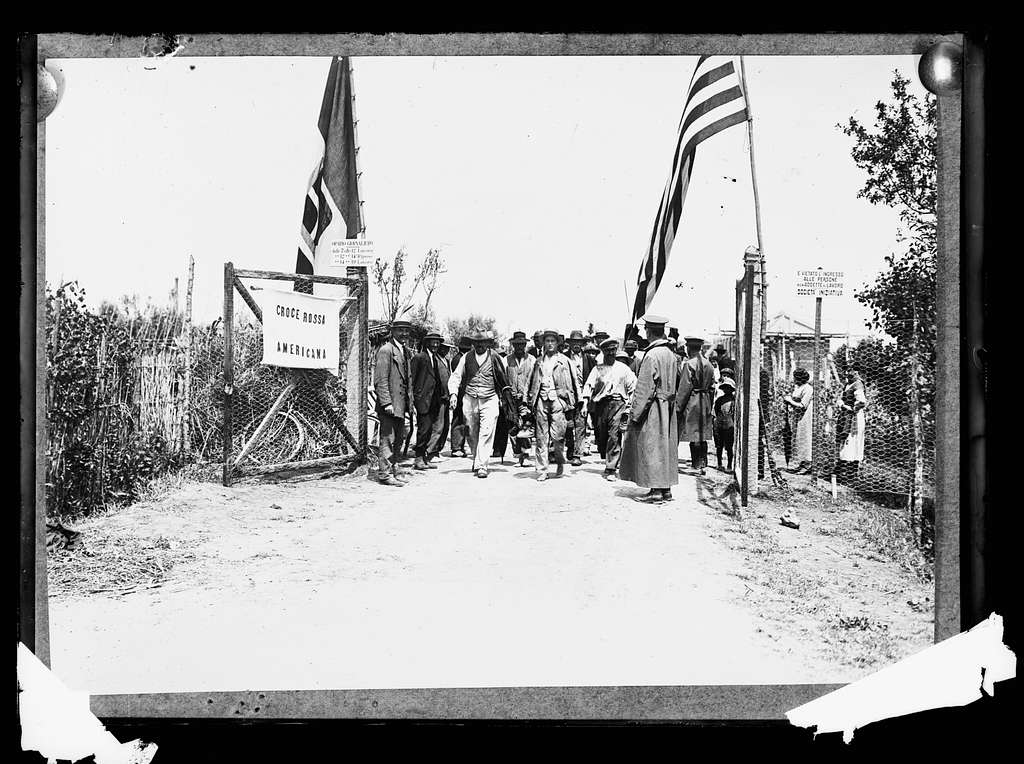
Workmen leaving the ARC village at Pisa.

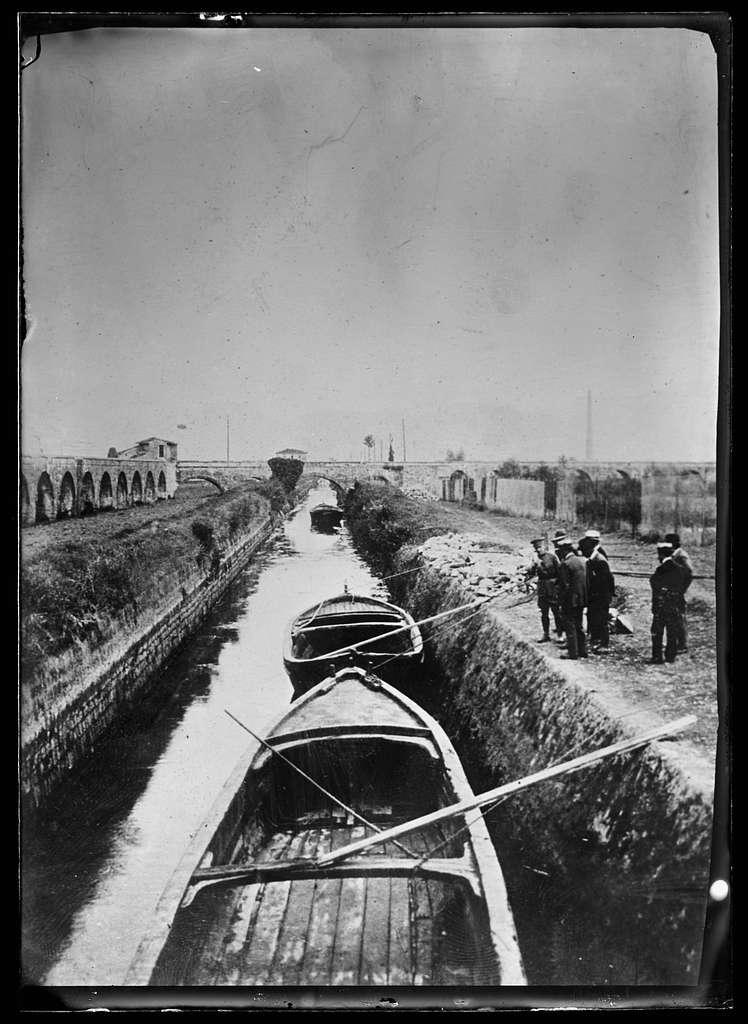
Canal, by old aqueduct near Pisa. These boats bring some of the material for building the ARC concrete village.

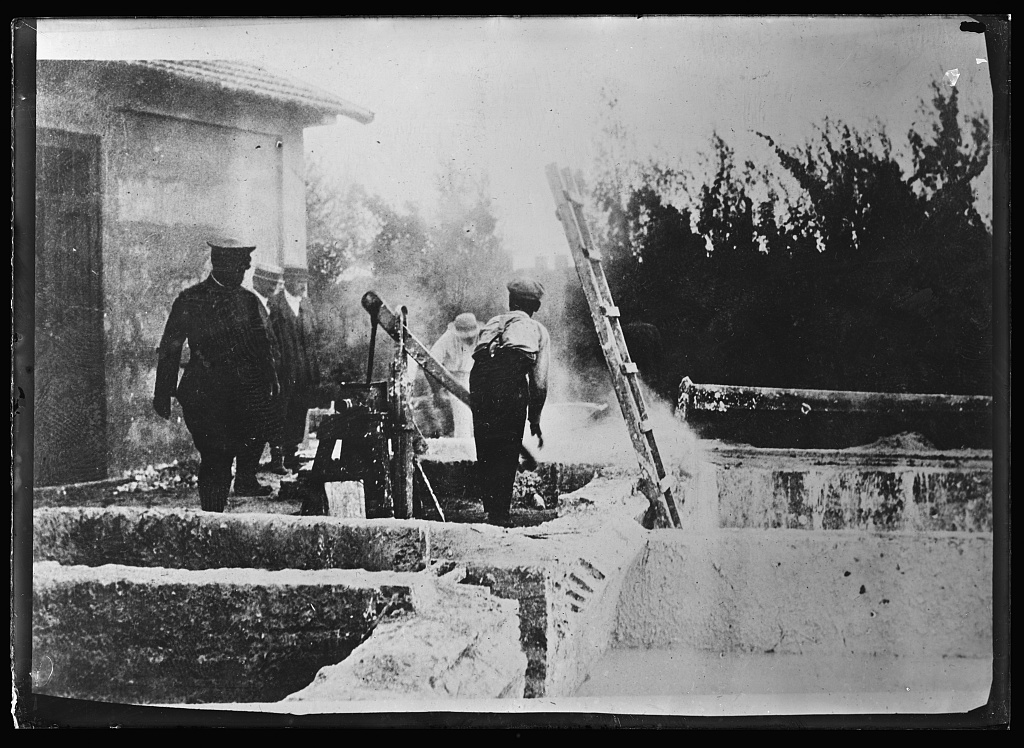
Workers building the ARC village.

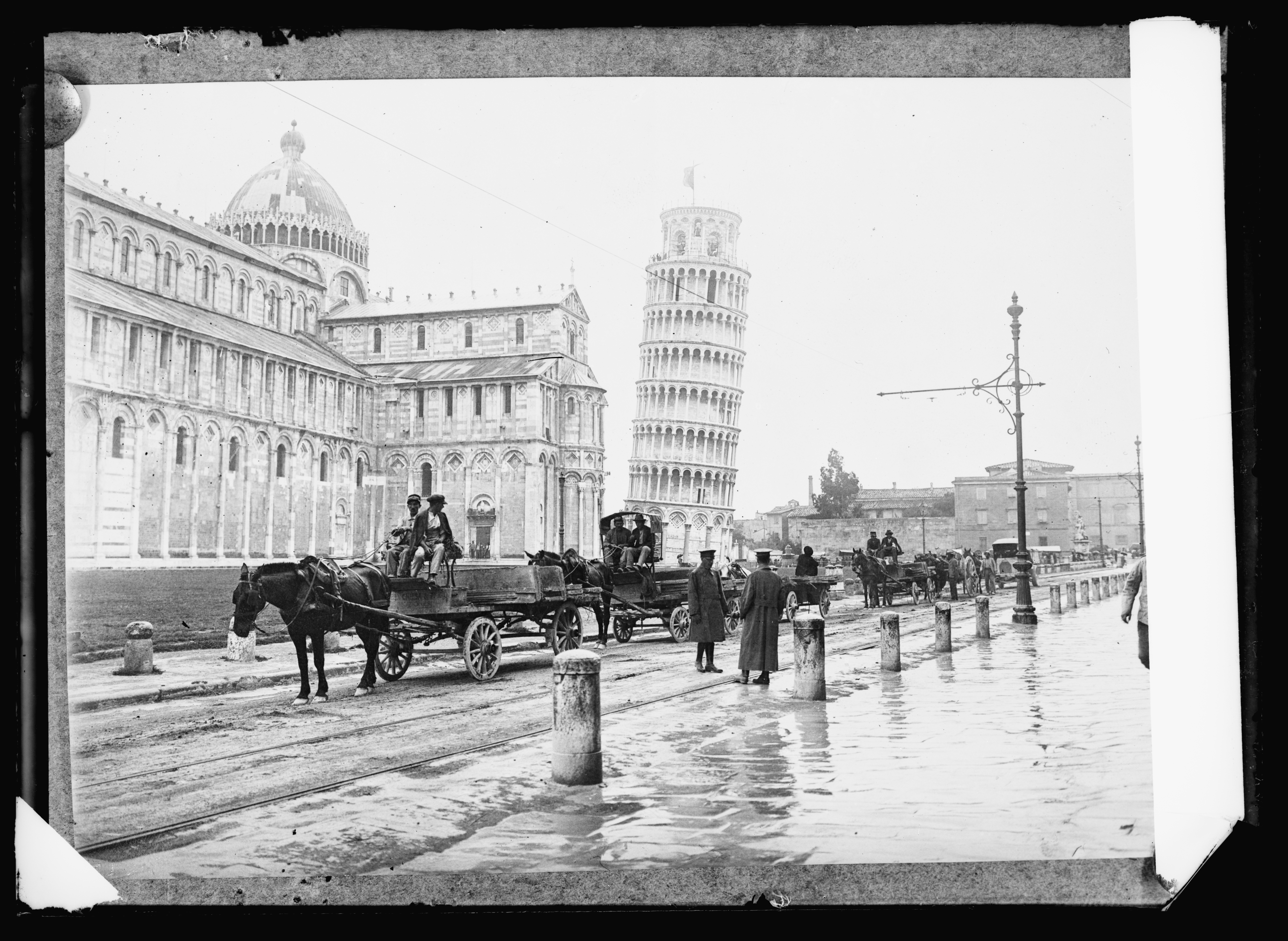
Trucks with material for the ARC village passing the leaning tower.

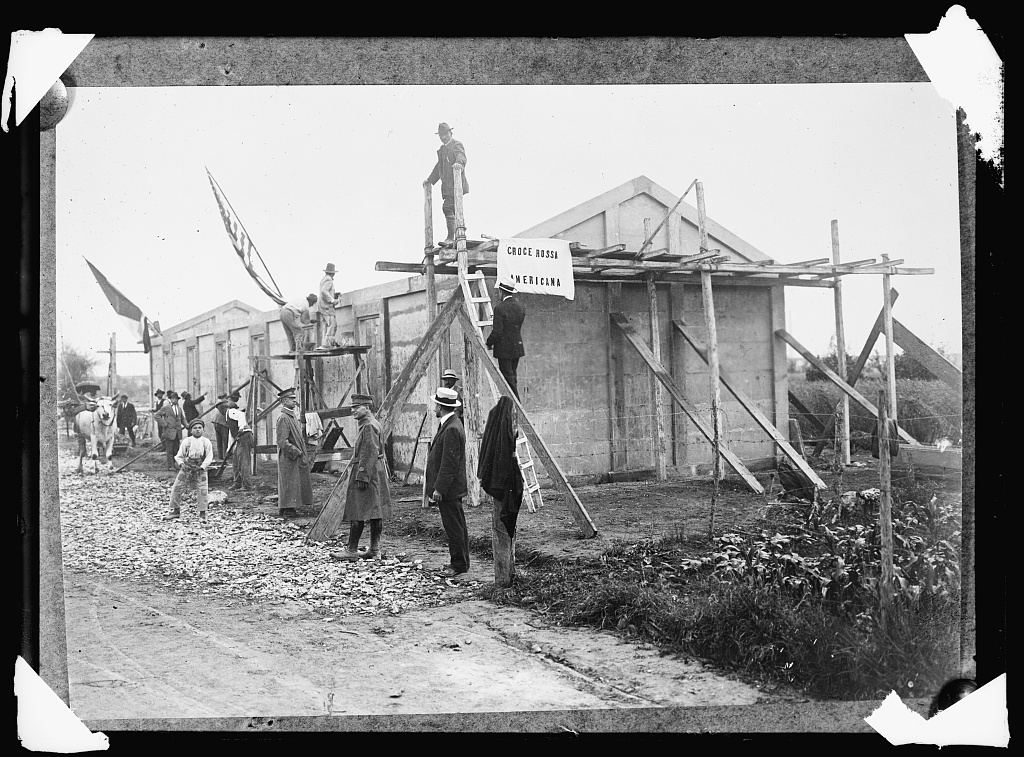
The first building at the ARC village.

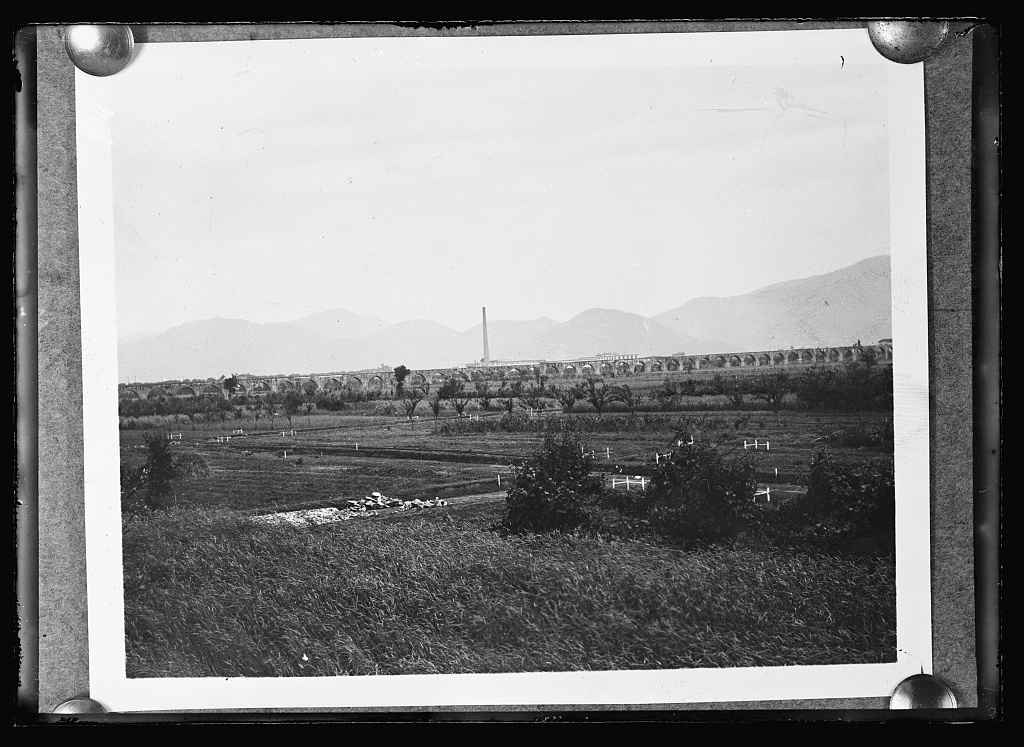
Part of the grounds of the ARC village.

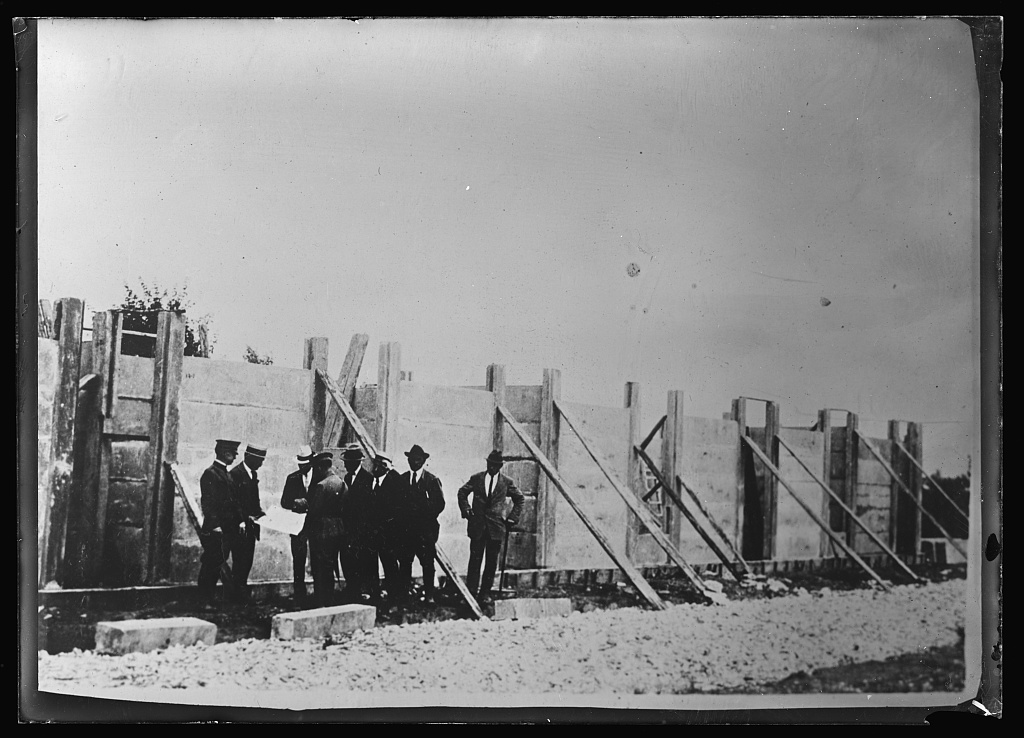
One of the cement buildings partly finished at the ARC village.

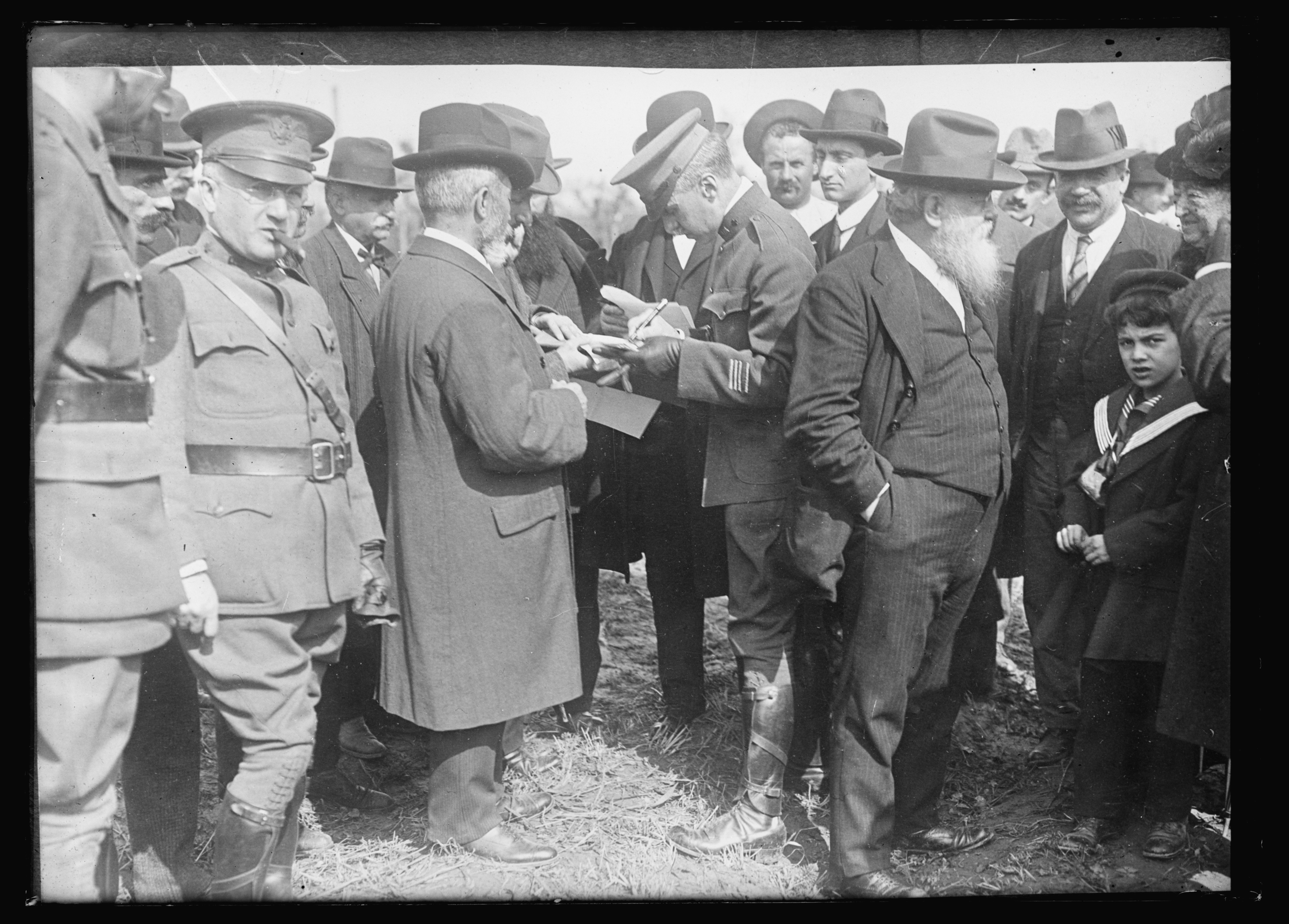
Signing the contract by which the American Red Cross agrees to build the village at Pisa housing 2000 refugees. Major Chester Aldrich, Director of Civil Affairs of the ARC, is in the center with the governor of the Province of Pisa and the Pisan contractor.
