= Ministry of War (Italy) =

Italian government agency (1861–1947)

- Ministero della guerra
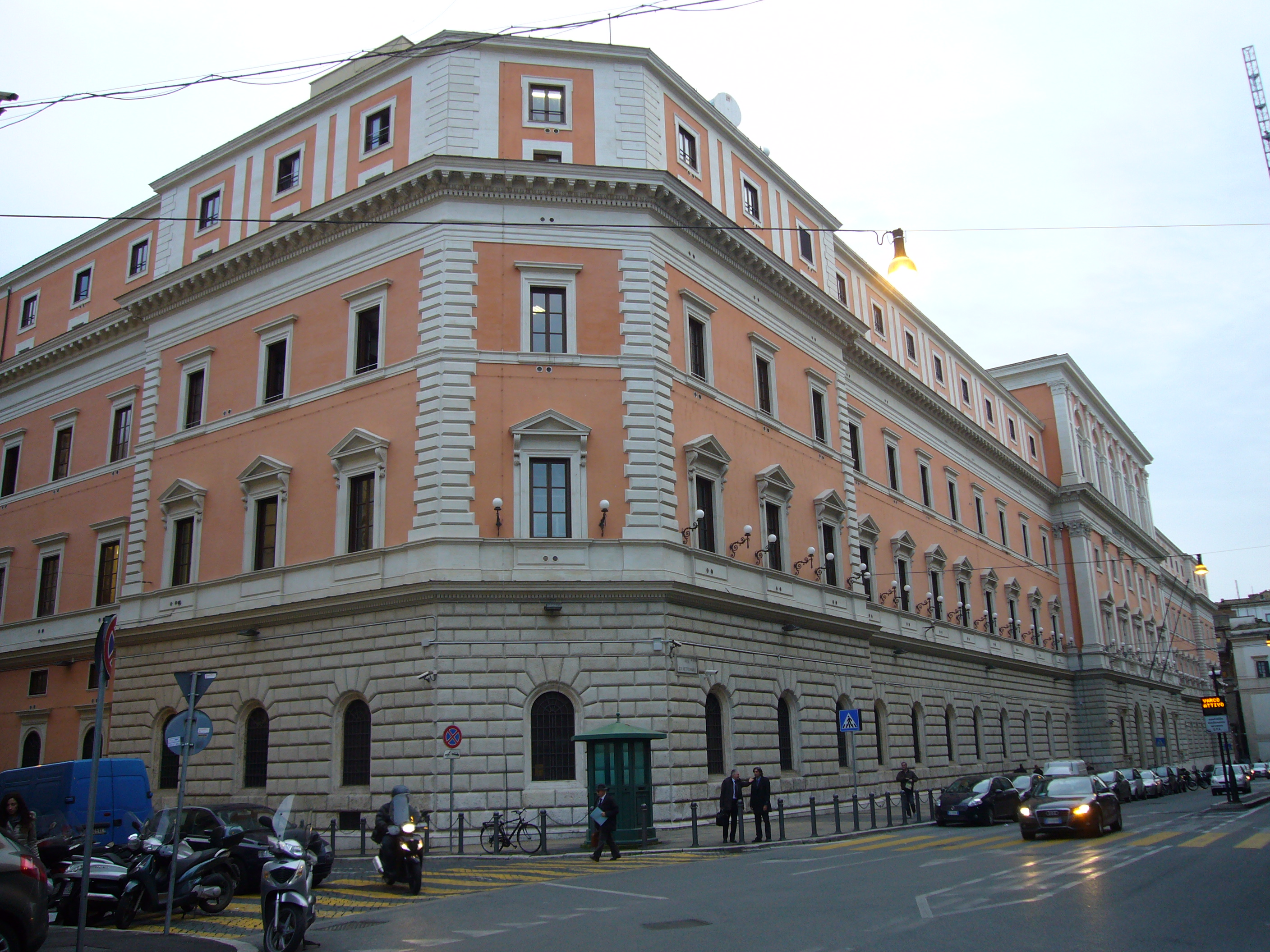
- The Palazzo Esercito ("Army Palace") in Rome, once the headquarters of the Ministry of War, on 2 December 2010.

Agency overview
- Formed: 1861; 165 years ago
- Preceding agency: Ministry of War (Kingdom of Sardinia)
- Dissolved: 14 February 1947; 79 years ago
- Superseding agency: Ministry of Defence
- Jurisdiction: Government of Italy

The Ministry of War (Italian: Ministero della guerra) was a ministry of the Kingdom of Italy from 1861 to 1946 and of the Italian Republic from 1946 to 1947. Under the Kingdom of Italy, it oversaw the Royal Army (Italian: Regio Esercito), while under the Italian Republic it oversaw the Italian Army (Italian: Esercito Italiano). It was abolished in 1947, when it merged with the Ministry of Aeronautics and the Ministry of the Navy to form the Ministry of Defence.

== History ==
The Italian Ministry of War had its origins in the Kingdom of Sardinia, which on 11 October 1850 divided its Ministry of War and the Navy, moving the oversight of the Royal Sardinian Navy to the Ministry of Agriculture and Commerce and retaining oversight of the Royal Sardinian Army in a new Ministry of War. When Italy unified in 1861 to form the Kingdom of Italy, the last King of Sardinia became the King of Italy as Victor Emmanuel II, and in that year Italy's Fourth Cavour government drew upon the former Sardinian Ministry of War to create an Italian Ministry of War to oversee the new Italian Royal Army (Italian: Regio Esercito).

Until 1920, the ministry was a stronghold of the upper hierarchy of the Royal Army, who always rejected any form of control by the Parliament of Italy. During the years from 1861 to 1920, the minister usually was a Royal Army general, the office of the Royal Army's chief of the general staff dominated Royal Army policymaking, and civilians rarely had much of a say in the Royal Army's affairs. If anything, Italy's participation in World War I (May 1915–November 1918) increased the general staff's dominance within the ministry. When Ivanoe Bonomi became Minister of War in the Fifth Giolitti government in 1920, however, he introduced a reform of the military system which took his name and reduced the powers of the office of the chief of the general staff.

Under the fascist government of Prime Minister Benito Mussolini, Mussolini himself served as the Minister of War from 1925 to 1929 and from 1933 to 25 July 1943, delegating its ordinary management to a Royal Army general, who he appointed as undersecretary of state. The Mussolini government made changes to the Ministry of War's responsibilities during the mid-1920s. On 30 August 1925, it split off the Ministry of War's oversight of aviation activities into a new Ministry of Aeronautics, reflecting the transformation of the Ministry of War's Commissariat for Aeronautics into the new Regia Aeronautica ("Royal Air Force") in 1923. With the "Mussolini Order" of 1926, oversight of the Royal Corps of Colonial Troops (Italian: Regio Corpo Truppe Coloniali, or RCTC) in the colonies of the Italian Empire moved from the Ministry of War to the Ministry of the Colonies.

Italy entered World War II on the side of the Axis powers in June 1940. In September 1943, it surrendered to the Allies and switched sides, becoming a co-belligerent with the Allies. Between September 1943 and the surrender of Nazi Germany in May 1945, with the Kingdom of Italy in control of southern Italy, the ministry oversaw the Royal Army's forces as they fought as the Italian Co-belligerent Army alongside Allied forces in the Italian campaign and simultaneously in the Italian Civil War against the Italian Social Republic, which the Germans established as a puppet state in northern Italy under Mussolini and which continued to fight on the Axis side.

In 1946, the Italian Republic replaced the Kingdom of Italy. Under the republic, the Ministry of War exercised oversight of what was now known as the Italian Army (Italian: Esercito Italiano).

Under the Third De Gasperi government, by Decree Number 17 of the provisional head of state on 4 February 1947, the Ministry of War, Ministry of the Navy, and Ministry of Aeronautics were abolished as of 14 February 1947, and their responsibilities were transferred to a new, unified Ministry of Defence.

== Organization ==
=== 1928 ===
In 1928, the organization of the ministry was as follows:

- Office of the Minister
- Coordination Office
- General Staff
- General Directorate for Civilian Personnel and General Affairs
- General Directorate for Officer Personnel
- General Directorate for Non-Commissioned Officers and Troops
- General Directorate for Artillery and Automobiles
- General Directorate for Engineers
- General Directorate for Logistical Services
- General Directorate for Military Health Care
- General Administrative Inspectorate
- Director of the Military Chemical Center
- Equestrian and Veterinary Service
- Division for Physical Education, Pre-Military Education, and Military Schools

=== 1940 ===
With Italy's entry into World War II in June 1940, the ministry was reorganized under Law Number 1039 on 6 July 1940 as follows:

- Office of the Minister
- Private Secretariat of the Undersecretary of State
- Headquarters
- General Directorate for Officers on Permanent Duty
- General Directorate for Officers on Leave
- General Directorate for Civilian Personnel and General Affairs
- General Directorate for Artillery
- General Directorate for Engineers
- General Directorate for Logistics Services
- General Directorate for Military Health
- General Directorate for Administrative Services
- Directorate for the Military Chemical Service
- General Directorate for Recruits, Non-Commissioned Officers, and Troops
- General Directorate for Motorization
- Superior Inspectorate of Technical Services
- Equestrian and Veterinary Service
- Military Information Service
- Autonomous Company of the Royal Carabinieri
- Military Publications Office

== List of ministers ==
See Minister of War (Italy).
