= Palazzo dell'Aeronautica =

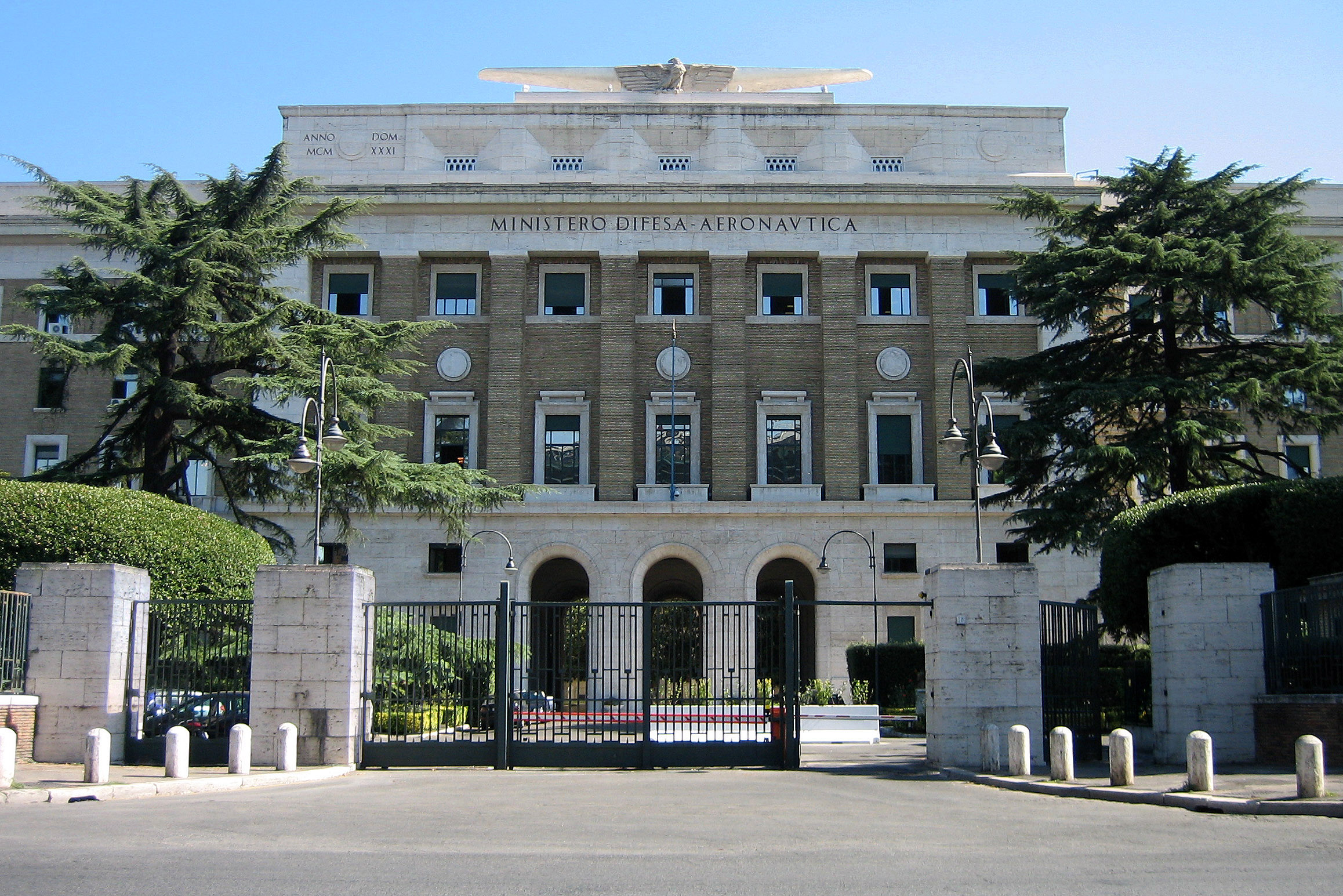
The Palazzo dell'Aeronautica in 2007.

The Palazzo dell'Aeronautica is a building in Rome, Italy, and is the headquarters of the Italian Air Force.

== History ==
Italo Balbo, who was Chief of Staff of the Italian Air Force at the time, turned to Roberto Marino, a 28-year-old architect for the Ministry of Aeronautics. The building was completed in two years and is considered the first in Italy to be built entirely of reinforced concrete, consisting of 40-metre (43.74-yard) stone columns resting on foundations of 21 metres (22.97 yds).

The work began on 2 August 1929 and was officially inaugurated on 28 October 1931 as headquarters of the Italian Royal Air Force with the ninth anniversary of the March on Rome.
