= Ministry of the Navy (Italy) =

Italian government agency (1861–1947)

- Ministero della marina (1861–1946); Ministero della marina militare (1946–1947)
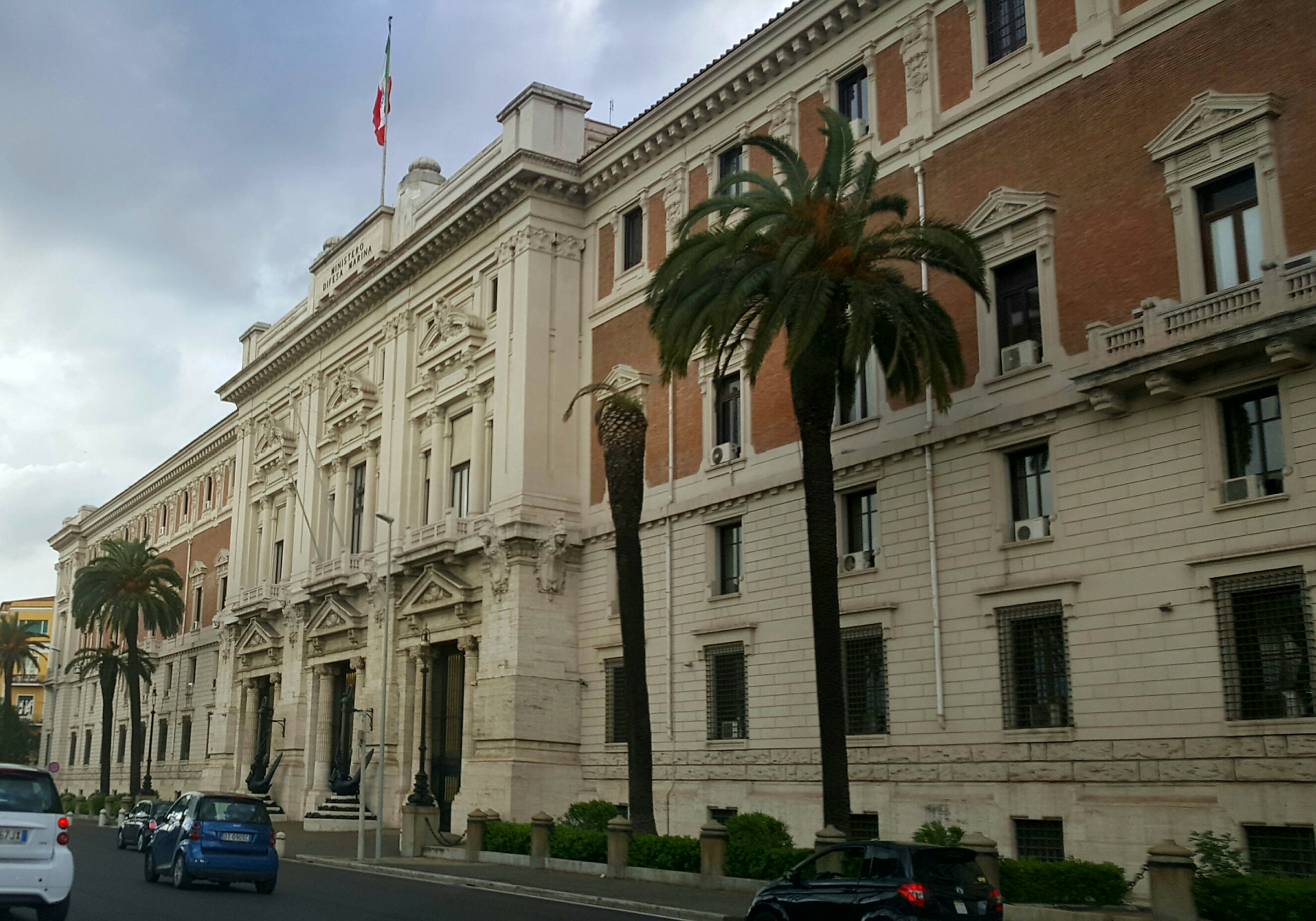
- The Palazzo Marina ("Navy Palace") in Rome on 13 May 2016. It served as the headquarters of the Ministry of the Navy.

Agency overview
- Formed: 1861; 165 years ago
- Preceding agency: Ministry of the Navy (Kingdom of Sardinia)
- Dissolved: 14 February 1947; 79 years ago
- Superseding agency: Ministry of Defence
- Jurisdiction: Government of Italy

The Ministry of the Navy (Italian: Ministero della marina) was a ministry of the Kingdom of Italy from 1861 to 1946 and of the Italian Republic from 1946 to 1947. Under the Kingdom of Italy, it oversaw the Regia Marina ("Royal Navy"), while under the Italian Republic, when its name became Ministero della marina militare (literally "Ministry of the Military Navy"), it oversaw the Marina Militare (literally "Military Navy," usually translated as "Italian Navy"). The ministry was abolished in 1947, when it merged with the Ministry of Aeronautics and the Ministry of War to form the Ministry of Defence.

== History ==
The Italian Ministry of the Navy had its origins in the Kingdom of Sardinia, which on 11 October 1850 divided its Ministry of War and the Navy, creating a separate Ministry of War and moving oversight of the Royal Sardinian Navy to the Ministry of Agriculture and Commerce. By a royal decree of 23 October 1853, the Kingdom of Sardinia established a separate Ministry of the Navy.

When Italy unified in 1861 to form the Kingdom of Italy, the last King of Sardinia became the King of Italy as Victor Emmanuel II, and in that year Italy's Fourth Cavour government drew upon the Sardinian Ministry of the Navy to create an Italian Ministry of the Navy to oversee the new Italian Regia Marina ("Royal Navy"). The new ministry also had oversight responsibility for the Italian merchant marine, with control of the Division of the Merchant Marine and Maritime Health (Italian: Divisione della marina mercantile e della sanità marittima), which in 1874 was renamed the General Directorate of the Merchant Marine (Italian: Direzione generale della marina mercantile). The ministry retained its merchant marine responsibilities until 1916, when oversight of the merchant marine was transferred to the Ministry of Maritime and Railway Transport (Italian: Ministero dei Trasporti Marittimi e Ferroviari).

Under the fascist government of Prime Minister Benito Mussolini, the Regia Aeronautica ("Royal Air Force") was created in 1923 and took over aviation responsibilities from the Regia Marina and Italian Royal Army. On 30 August 1925, a new Ministry of Aeronautics took control of the oversight of aviation activities which previously had fallen under the Ministry of the Navy or the Ministry of War.

Mussolini himself served as the Minister of the Navy from 8 May 1925 to 12 September 1929 and from 6 November 1933 to 25 July 1943. Italy entered World War II on the side of the Axis powers in June 1940. In August 1943, the ministry regained oversight of the Italian merchant marine when the General Directorate of the Merchant Marine was transferred from the Ministry of Communications (Italian: Ministero delle comunicazioni) to the Ministry of the Navy, where it became an undersecretariat.

In September 1943, Italy surrendered to the Allies and switched sides, becoming a co-belligerent with the Allies. Between September 1943 and the surrender of Nazi Germany in May 1945, with the Kingdom of Italy in control of southern Italy, the ministry oversaw the Regia Marina′s forces as they fought as the Italian Co-belligerent Navy (Italian: Marina Cobelligerante Italiana)) alongside Allied forces in the Italian campaign and simultaneously in the Italian Civil War against the Italian Social Republic, which the Germans established as a puppet state in northern Italy under Mussolini and which continued to fight on the Axis side.

In 1946, the Italian Republic replaced the Kingdom of Italy. Under the Republic, the Ministry of the Navy, renamed Ministero della marina militare (literally "Ministry of the Military Navy"), had oversight of what was now called the Marina maritime, literally "Military Navy" but usually translated as "Italian Navy." Upon the establishment of the Republic, the Ministry of the Navy again lost its responsibility for the merchant marine, oversight of which was transferred to a new Ministry of the Merchant Marine (Italian: Ministero della marina mercantile) on 13 July 1946.

Under the Third De Gasperi government, by Decree Number 17 of the provisional head of state on 4 February 1947, the Ministry of the Navy, Ministry of War, and Ministry of Aeronautics were abolished as of 14 February 1947, and their responsibilities were transferred to a new, unified Ministry of Defence.

== Organization ==
=== 1876 ===
The organization of the Ministry of the Navy established by Royal Decree Number 3624 of 31 December 1876 was as follows:

- Office of the Minister, including the General Secretariat, the Division of Personnel, and the Division of Military Service
- General Directorate of Materiel
- General Directorate of the Merchant Marine
- Central Maritime Military Health Office

=== 1914 ===
Royal Decree Number 860 of 28 June 1914 established the following organization:

- Office of the Minister
- General Secretariat of the Ministry
- General Directorate for officers and Military and Scientific Service
- General Directorate for the Crew Corps
- General Directorate for Naval Construction
- General Directorate for Artillery and Armaments
- General Directorate for Administrative Services
- General Directorate for the Merchant Marine;
- Inspectorate for the Operation and Economy of Machinery
- Inspectorate for Maritime Military Health Care
- Inspectorate for the Maritime Military Commissariat
- Inspectorate for Military Engineering for Naval Works, Lighthouses, and Maritime Signaling
- Inspectorate for Maritime Services
- Inspectorate for Port Authorities
- Inspectorate for Civilian Personnel and General Affairs

=== 1923 ===
Royal Decree Number 2052 of 10 September 1923 established the following organization:

- Office of the Minister, with the Office of Law and Decrees attached
- Office for Nautical Education
- General Directorate for Military Personnel and Services
- General Directorate for Civilian Personnel and General Affairs
- General Directorate for Artillery and Armaments
- General Directorate for Naval Construction
- Central Directorate for the Operation and Economy of Machinery
- Central Directorate for Maritime Military Health
- Central Directorate for the Maritime Military Commissariat
- Central Directorate for Military Engineering for Naval Work

=== 1936 ===
Royal Decree Number 773 of 16 April 1936 established the following organization:

- Office of the Minister
- Private Secretariat of the Undersecretary of State
- Office of Law and Decrees, reporting to the minister
- General Directorate for Military Personnel and Services
- General Directorate for Naval and Mechanical Construction
- General Directorate for Naval Weapons and Armaments
- General Directorate for Civilian Personnel and General Affairs
- General Directorate for Maritime Military Health Care
- General Directorate for the Maritime Military Commissariat
- General Directorate for Military Engineers and Naval Works
- General Directorate for Administrative Services

=== 1944 ===
Legislative Decree Number 342 of 28 September 1944 established the following organization:

- Office of the Minister
- General Secretariat of the Ministry
- General Directorate for Military and Scientific Officers and Services
- General Directorate for the Maritime Crew Corps
- General Directorate for Naval and Mechanical Construction
- General Directorate for Naval Weapons and Armaments
- General Directorate for Civilian Personnel and General Affairs
- General Directorate for Maritime Military Health Care
- General Directorate for the Maritime Military Commissariat
- General Directorate for Military Ingenuity in Naval Work
- General Directorate for Administrative Services

== List of ministers ==
See Minister of the Navy (Italy).
