= Ministry of the Air Force (Italy) =

Italian government agency (1925–1947)

- Ministero dell'aeronautica
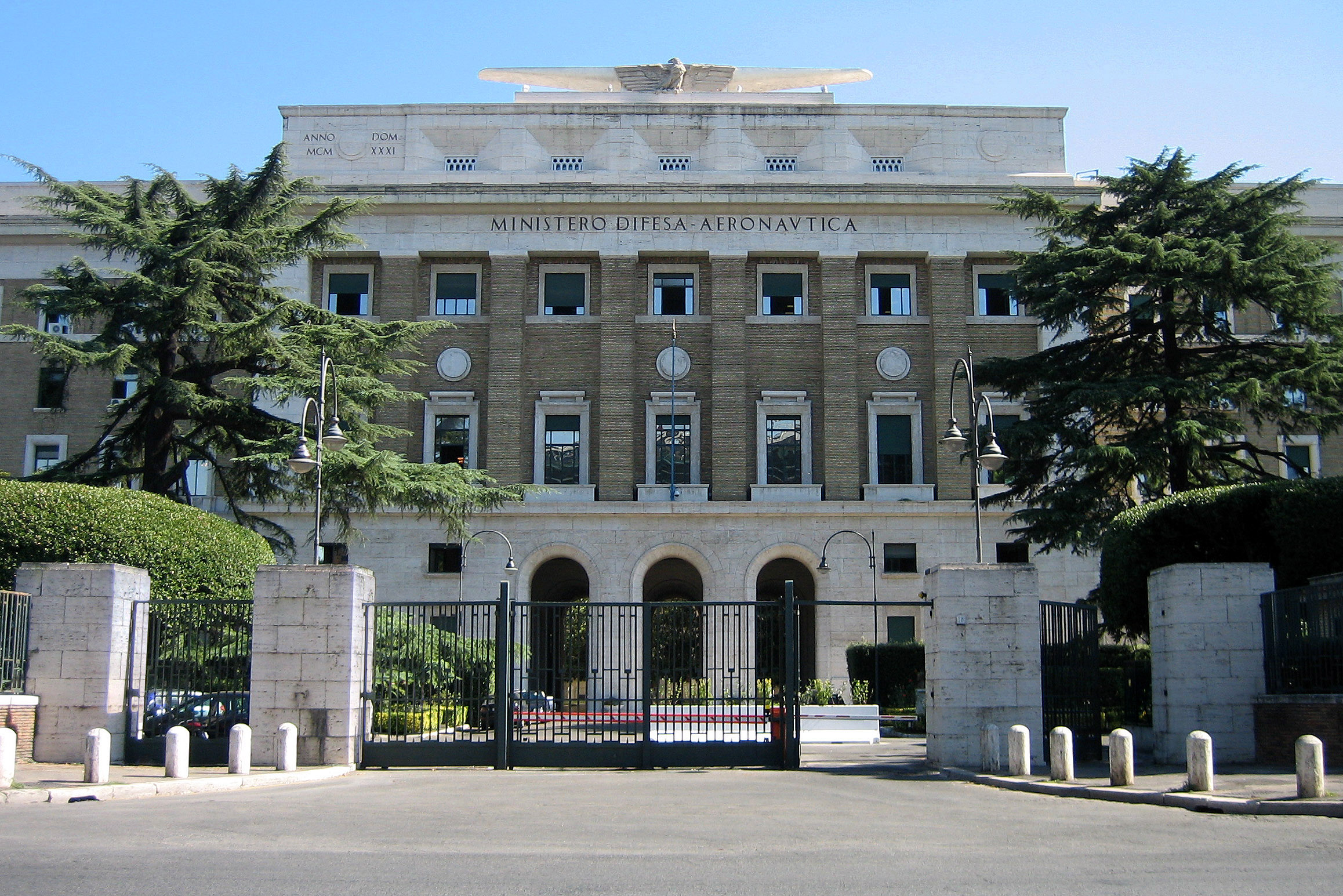
- The Palazzo dell'Aeronautica in Rome, once the headquarters of the Ministry of Aeronautics, on 21 September 2007.

Agency overview
- Formed: 30 August 1925; 100 years ago
- Preceding agency: General Commissariat for Aeronautics
- Dissolved: 14 February 1947; 79 years ago
- Superseding agency: Ministry of Defence
- Jurisdiction: Government of Italy

The Ministry of the Air Force (Italian: Ministero dell'aeronautica) was a department of the Kingdom of Italy, and subsequently of the Italian Republic, with jurisdiction over both military and civil aviation. Established in 1925, it was abolished in 1947 when it merged with the Ministry of War and the Ministry of the Navy to form the Ministry of Defence.

Although generally translated as "Ministry of the Air Force" in English, the literal English translation of the ministry's name is "Ministry of Aeronautics," which more accurately captures its role in overseeing both the air force and civil aviation. Its role thus was analogous to the contemporary British Air Ministry and Ministry of Aviation (Reichslutfahrtministerium) of Nazi Germany, both of which oversaw both military and civil aviation.

== Origins ==
In 1912, after the Italo-Turkish War ended, the Italian Ministry of War (Italian: Ministero della guerra) established an Aeronautical Inspectorate (Italian: Ispettorato aeronautico). It later became the Directorate of Aviation Services (Italian: Direzione dei servizi aeronautici).

During World War I, the Orlando government established the General Commissariat for Aeronautics (Italian: Commissariato generale per l'aeronautica) at the Ministry of Arms and Munitions (Italian: Ministero delle armi e munizioni) with Lieutenant Legislative Decree Number 1813 on 1 November 1917, and Eugenio Chiesa, a member of the Chamber of Deputies, was appointed commissioner that day. In December 1917, the Ministry of Arms and Munitions established the General Directorate of Aviation (Italian: Direzione generale di aviazione) under Colonel Giulio Douhet, but Douhet soon had a falling out with Chiesa and left the directorate in April 1918.

On 24 November 1918, the commissariat moved from the Ministry of Arms and Munitions to the Ministry of War. On 30 June 1919, the general management of aeronautics was transferred to the Ministry of Maritime and Railway Transport (Italian: Ministero dei trasporti marittimi e ferroviari).

In his first cabinet, Prime Minister Benito Mussolini on 24 January 1923 established a General Commissariat for the Air Force (Italian: Commissariato generale per l'Aeronautica), overseeing both military and civil aviation, with Mussolini himself as commissioner. Aldo Finzi served as deputy commissioner and prepared the legislative provisions necessary for the establishment of both the Ministry of the Air Force and an independent air force. He established two general directorates – one for the air force and one for civil aviation – and appointed Giulio Douhet, who became a major general, as general director for the air force and Lieutenant Colonel Arturo Mercanti as general director for civil aviation. Royal Decree Number 645 of 28 March 1923 established a new armed force, the Regia Aeronautica (literally “Royal Aeronautics” but usually translated as “Royal Air Force”) and resubordinated all military air forces in the Kingdom of Italy and its colonies — including both those previously under the control of the Regio Esercito (“Royal Army”) and those previously under the Regia Marina (“Royal Navy”) — to the new air force.

On 14 May 1925, the position of deputy commissioner for the Air Force was abolished and that of undersecretary of state for the Air Force was created, to which Divisional General Alberto Bonzani was appointed.

== Creation ==
Royal Legislative Decree Number 1513 established the Ministry of the Air Force on 30 August 1925, transforming the commissariat into a ministry. The new ministry oversaw both the Regia Aeronautica and civil aviation and brought together all the aeronautical services previously under the Ministry of War. Initially, the Ministry of the Air Force had three general directorates: the General Directorate for Military Personnel and Aeronautical Schools, the General Directorate for Civil Aeronautical Personnel, and the General Directorate for the Aeronautical Engineering Corps.

== History ==
Prime Minister Mussolini himself served as minister of the Air Force from 1925 to 1929, with a senior Regia Aeronautica officer appointed to serve as secretary of state, to whom Mussolini delegated everyday management of the ministry.

Italo Balbo became undersecretary in 1926 and succeeded Mussolini as minister in 1929. Balbo gave a notable impetus to the establishment of aviation in Italy. Under Balbo, the Fascist politician Raffaello Riccardi served as undersecretary.

Balbo's tenure as minister ended in 1933 when Mussolini again became minister of the Air Force in addition to prime minister, and Mussolini remained minister of the Air Force until his fascist regime ended on 25 July 1943. Riccardi also departed in 1933, and Mussolini resumed the previous practice of appointing a senior Regia Aeronautica officer to serve as secretary of state and handle the ministry's daily management.

The Kingdom of Italy was abolished in 1946 and replaced by the Italian Republic. Under the republic, the Ministry of Aeronautics continued its oversight of both civil aviation and the air force, the latter now renamed the Aeronautica Militare (literally "Military Aeronautics," but usually translated as "Italian Air Force").

== Abolition ==
With Decree Number 17 of the provisional head of state of 4 February 1947, the Third De Gasperi government ordered the dissolution of the Ministry of the Air Force, Ministry of the Navy, and Ministry of War, effective 14 February 1947, and their merger to form the new Ministry of Defence (Italian: Ministero della difesa). The Ministry of Defence retained control of the Directorate General of Civil Aviation and Air Traffic (Italian: Direzione generale dell'Aviazione civile e del traffico aereo) until the Italian Republic transferred the responsibilities for civil aviation to the Ministry of Transport and Civil Aviation (Italian: Ministero dei trasporti e dell'aviazione civile) in 1963.

== Organization ==
In 1942, the Ministry of the Air Force was organized as follows:[6]

- Office of the Minister
- General Directorate of Military Personnel
- General Directorate of Civilian Personnel and General Affairs
- General Directorate of Material and Airport Services
- General Directorate of Construction and Supplies
- Superior Directorate of Studies and Experiments
- General Directorate of Civil Aviation and Air Traffic
- General Directorate of Weapons and Ammunition
- General Directorate of State Property
- General Directorate of the Military Commissariat
- Telecommunications and Flight Assistance Inspectorate
- Health Inspectorate
- Inspectorate of Aeronautical Engineering and Aeronautical Production

== Building ==
The ministry building is in Rome near the Sapienza University of Rome and the Roma Termini railway station. It consists of the historic Palazzo dell'Aeronautica, designed in 1929 by engineer Roberto Marino and opened in 1931. It was completed by the construction of the former Air War School, the Air Force Officers' Club building, and the Operational Technical Services Building (E.S.T.O.) built in the 1980s.
