= Ministry of Defence (Italy) =

Government ministry of Italy

- Ministero della Difesa

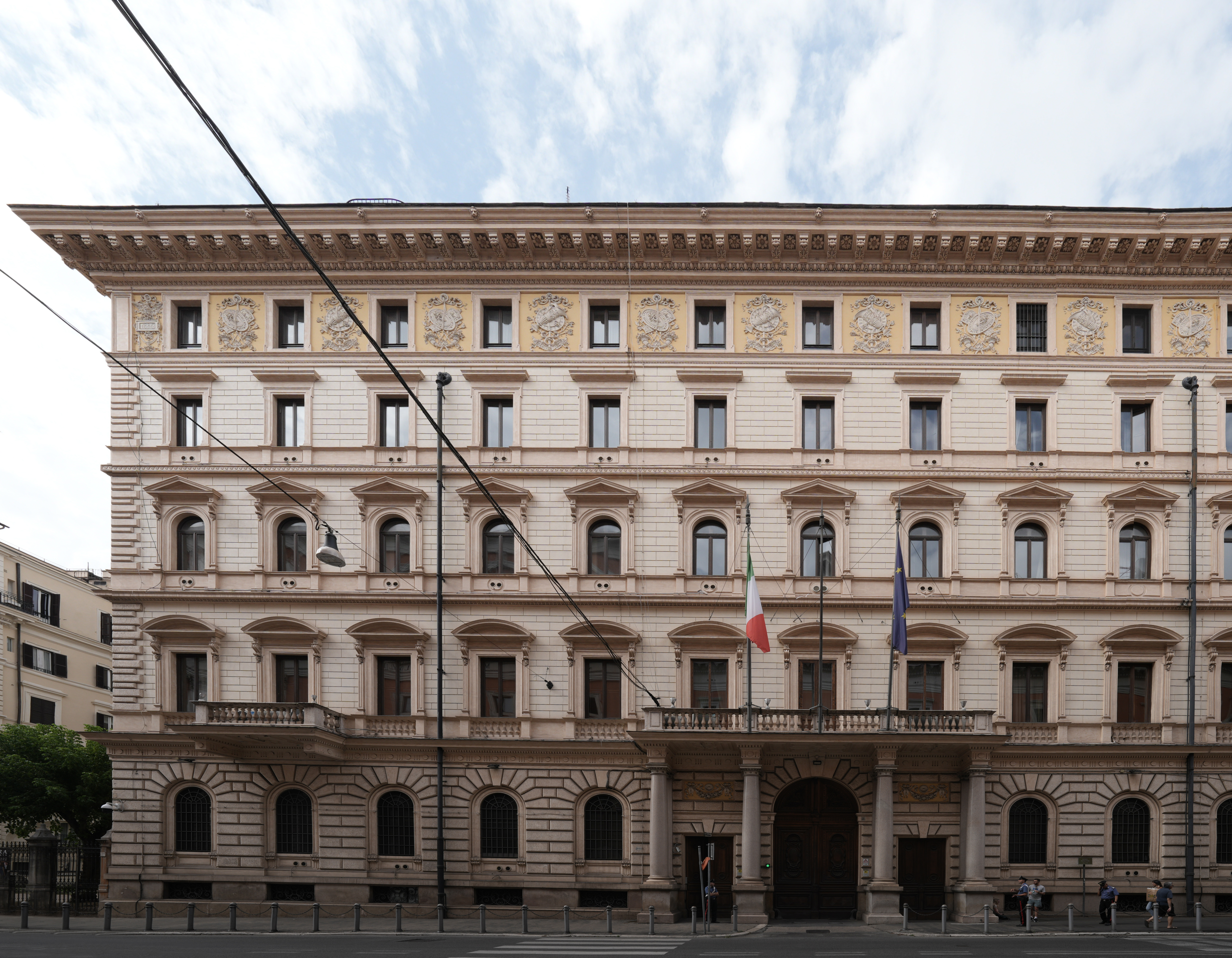
- Headquarters in Via XX Settembre

Ministry of the Italian Republic overview
- Formed: February 14, 1947; 79 years ago
- Preceding agencies: Ministry of War; Ministry of the Navy; Ministry of Aeronautics
- Jurisdiction: Government of Italy
- Headquarters: Via XX Settembre, 8; 00187 Rome; 41.54806°N 12.293306°E
- Minister responsible: Guido Crosetto
- Deputy Ministers responsible: Angelo Tofalo; Raffaele Volpi
- Website: www.difesa.it

The Ministry of Defence (Italian: Ministero della Difesa, or MDD) is the government body of the Italian Republic responsible for military and civil defence matters and managing the Italian Armed Forces. It is led by the Italian Minister of Defence, a position occupied by Guido Crosetto since October 2022.

The Ministry of Defence was created in 1947 by the merger of the Ministry of War, Ministry of the Navy, and Ministry of Aeronautics under the De Gasperi III Cabinet.

The first Minister of Defence was Luigi Gasparotto.

== History ==
The precursors of the Ministry of Defence were the Ministry of War and the Ministry of the Navy, among the first ministries created in the Kingdom of Sardinia. With the Italian unification, during the Cavour IV Cabinet, the division of the two ministries remained, similar to other European government bodies. On 30 August 1925 the Mussolini Cabinet established the Ministry of Aeronautics as a third ministry with a military role; it oversaw both the Regia Aeronautica ("Royal Air Force") and civil aviation. In Mussolini's Italian Social Republic of 1943–1945, a Ministry of National Defence was created, but was abolished along with the rest of the Italian Social Republic upon the cessation of World War II and the Italian Civil War in 1945.

The Ministries of War, the Navy, and Aeronautics came under the control of the Italian Republic when it replaced the Kingdom of Italy in June 1946. The Decree of the Temporary Head of State n. 17 of 4 February 1947, issued during the De Gasperi III Cabinet, established the merger of the Ministries of War, Navy, and Aeronautics — which, autonomously and with their own regulations, had presided over matters of military defence until then — into the unified Ministry of Defence. Upon its creation, the Ministry of Defence inherited oversight of civil aviation from the Ministry of Aeronautics, but the Italian Republic transferred the responsibilities for civil aviation to the Ministry of Transport and Civil Aviation (Italian: Ministero dei trasporti e dell'aviazione civile) in 1963.

The provisions which led to the actual unification of the Ministry were law n. 1862 of 12 December 1962 and law n. 1058 of 2 October 1964, with which that delegation was renewed and extended by civil personnel in order to conform to needs derived from the organization of central and peripheral services offices, as well as of factories and military arsenals.

== Task and functions ==
Flag of the Minister of Defence, established with Ministerial Decree of 23 April 2002.

The Minister has the task of overseeing the coordination of Italian defence and he/she is charged with reporting to the Parliament on any military implications for Italy, the redistribution of military expenditure and the implementation of national defensive programmes.

This activity has to be coordinated with those of the President of the Italian Republic, who presides over the Supreme Council of Defence and commands the Italian Armed Forces. The Minister of Defence, in relation to military magistrates and the Council of Military Judiciary, has the same function of the Italian Minister of Justice within the High Council of the Judiciary (CSM).

The Minister is also the chancellor and treasurer of the Military Order of Italy.

== Organization ==
The Ministry of Defence was re-organized with the Decree of the President of Republic n. 145 of 3 August 2009 in offices in direct collaboration with the Minister, 9 general directions for the technical-administrative field and commands for the technical-operative field. The structure of the General Secretariat, general directions and central offices of the Ministry of Defence is regulated by the Ministerial decree of 16 January 2013.

=== Cabinet office ===
The cabinet office of the Ministry is formed as follows:

- Secretary of the Minister;
- Cabinet office of the Minister;
- Legislative office of the Minister;
- Office of military policy of the Minister;
- Office of diplomatic advisor of the Minister;
- Internal control service of the Ministry of Defence;
- Public information service of the Minister;
- Secretaries of State undersecretaries;
- Spokesperson of the Minister;
- Legal advisor to the Minister;
- Political advisor to the Minister.

=== Technical-administrative area ===
The technical-administrative area is organized in four general directions and five technical directions:

- General Direction for Military Personnel (telegraphic abbreviation: PERSOMIL);
- General Direction for Civil Personnel (PERSOCIV);
- General Direction of Military Social Security and Conscription (PREVIMIL);
- General Direction of Commissariat and General Services (COMMISERVIZI);
- Field Weaponry Direction (TERRARM);
- Naval Weaponry Direction (NAVARM);
- Air Force Weaponry Direction (ARMAEREO);
- IT, Telematic and Advanced Technologies Direction (TELEDIFE);
- Direction of Works and State Property (GENIODIFE);

This field reports directly to the General Secretary and National Director of Weaponry, who in turn report to the Defence Chief of Staff only for technical-operative aspects.

=== Technical-operative Area ===
The operative-military structure of the Ministry is organized as follows:

- Chief of Defence General Staff (CSMD);
- Italian Joint Operations Headquarters (JOHQ - COI);
- Centre for Defence Higher Studies (CASD);
- Joint Special Forces Operations Headquarters (COFS);
- Interforce military entities:
  - Italian Joint Air Operations School
  - Joint School of CBRN Defence
  - Armed Forces Institute of Telecommunications

The Defence General Staff (Stato maggiore della Difesa) report directly to the Minister, with the Chief of Defence at the top who controls the Chiefs of Staff of the Armed Forces and, limited to the technical-operative attributions, the General Secretary of Defence. The Chief of Defence is responsible for the planning, predisposition and use of armed forces in their entirety, and for these activities he is supported by a Staff and a Command of Joint Operations (COI).

=== Consultative bodies and personnel ===
The consultative and support bodies of the Minister of Defence are the following:

- Central Office of Budget and Financial Affairs (BILANDIFE);
- Central Office for Administrative Inspections (ISPEDIFE);
- General Commissariat for Honours to the Fallen of War (ONORCADUTI), articulated in territory with seven directions:
  - Direction of Asiago War Memorial (Trentino-Alto Adige and West Veneto)
  - Direction of Mount Grappa War Memorial (East Veneto)
  - Direction of Redipuglia War Memorial (Friuli-Venezia Giulia)
  - Direction of the War Memorial of Rome-Fosse Ardeatine
  - Direction of Mignano-Montelungo War Memorial
  - Direction of War Memorial of the Fallen Overseas in Bari (Southern Italy)
  - Direction of El Alamein Italian War Memorial
- Military Ordinariate of Italy.

== Chief of Defence General Staff ==
The Italian Chief of Defence General Staff is appointed with a decree of the President of the Republic, on proposal by the Minister of Defence. He must be an officer of the Navy, Army, or Air Force with the rank of ammiraglio di squadra, generale di corpo d'armata, or generale di squadra aerea in standing service. He reports directly to the Minister of Defence, for whom he is also the higher technical-military advisor and to whom he responds regarding the actuation of directives received.

The Chief of Staff of the Armed Forces, reunited in the committee of Chiefs of Staff, is hierarchically subordinate to the CSMD, who also joins the Supreme Council of Defence and he is replaced by the oldest in office among the Chiefs of Staff of the Armed Forces.

== General Secretary and National Director of Weaponry ==
The General Secretary of Defence is also the National Director of Weaponry, to whom the National Direction of Weaponry (within the General Secretariat of Defence) is subordinated. This charge was established in 1965 and it has been altered several times. During the 1990s, law n. 25 of 1997 made it more agile, efficient and appropriate for modern needs.

The General Secretary directly reports to the Minister of Defence regarding administrative competences and to the CSMD for technical-operative ones. He also controls the 9 general directions of the Ministry. The main tasks of the General Secretary of Defence are related to the actuation of directives issued by the Minister in the field of higher administration, to the operation of technical-administrative field of defence, to the promotion and coordination of technological research relative to weaponry materials. The General Secretary manages the supplying of means, materials and weapon systems for the Armed Forces, support to the Italian defence industry and direct/indirect offsets.

== Centre for Defence Higher Studies ==
The Centro Alti Studi per la Difesa ("Centre for Defence Higher Studies", CASD) is the highest organization of studies and training in the field of security and defence. The purpose of CASD is to improve the knowledge and skills of higher officials and civil defence officers, refine professional training and cultural formation of officers among interforces, and to work on studies regarding the organization of national defence and military preparation.

The president of the CASD is responsible for the higher studies in the field of security and defence, as well as for the training of the relative managers. He is assisted by a Staff for general support and the coordination of activities common to four independent bodies of CASD: Istituto alti studi per la difesa ("Italian Defence Higher Studies Institute", IASD), Istituto superiore di stato maggiore interforze ("Joint Services Staff College", ISSMI), Centro militare di studi strategici ("Military Centre for Strategic Studies", CeMiSS) and Centro per la Formazione Logistica Interforze ("Joint Logistics Education Centre", Ce. FLI). The president is directly subordinate to the Chief of Staff and is assisted by a Directive Council he presides over, formed by IASD military and civilian Adjuvant Directors, the ISSMI Director, the CeMiSS Director acting as secretary, the CeFLI Direction and the Chief of Defence.

The Directive Council examines and expresses its opinions on study programmes of the two formation institutes, on activities of sessions and courses, on the evaluation system of Attending Officers and on all the organizational and functional aspects of CASD, aimed at increasing the maximum level of synergy in the use of the available human, material and financial resources.

== Military Justice ==
According to the Italian Constitution, military courts have the jurisdiction established by law during wartime, while they only rule on military crimes committed by members of the Armed Forces. The relationship between the Minister of Defence, military magistrates and the Council of Military Judiciary is similar to the one between the Minister of Justice, High Council of the Judiciary and ordinary magistrates.

Disciplinary proceedings involving the military magistrates are regulated by the laws for ordinary magistrates. The military general prosecutor at the Court of Cassation exercises the function of the Public Minister and does not take part in deliberations.

Council of Military Judiciary

The Consiglio della magistratura militare ("Council of Military Judiciary", CMM) is an autonomous body with competences specular to the ordinary ones of the CSM. It was established with law n. 561 of 30 December 1988 and it covers assumptions, assignations, transfers, promotions, disciplinary proceedings and every aspect involving the juridical status of military magistrates. The CMM is also responsible for the provision of extrajudicial charges and it is competent on every other subject according to law.

== Overseen entities and controlled companies ==
According to the law, the Ministry oversees various public and private entities, as follows:

=== Public entities ===
The public entities overseen and funded by the Ministry are:

- Agenzia industrie difesa, which manages the productive assets of defence;
- Cassa di previdenza delle forze armate, a social security entity for militars;
- Opera nazionale dei figli degli aviatori (ONFA), for the assistance to sons and orphans of members of the Air Force;
- Italian Red Cross (CRI), for the training of personnel and acquisition of materials needed in order to ensure the organization of the CRI Military Voluntary Corps and Voluntary Nurses Corps of the Armed Forces;
- Lega navale italiana (LNI), for the assistance to members of the navy;
- Aero Club d'Italia (AECI), for the promotion and divulgation of the culture of flight and aviation in Italy. It is affiliated to CONI and overseen also by the Ministry of Infrastructure and Transport, Ministry of Economy and Finance, Presidency of the Council of Ministers and by the Ministry of the Interior.
- Unione italiana tiro a segno (UITS), an entity which promotes shooting sports and trains the armed personnel serving in public or private organizations;

=== Entities of Private Law ===
The entities of private law overseen and funded by the Ministry are:

- Unione nazionale ufficiali in congedo in Italia (UNUCI), which provides assistance to retired army officers;
- Istituto "Andrea Doria", for the assistance to orphans of navy members;
- Opera Nazionale di Assistenza per gli Orfani ed i Militari di Carriera dell’Esercito, a moral entity which provides assistance to orphans of Officers, Petty officers, NCOs and soldiers with at least one year of seniority service and the oblation paid, who died in military service or are in a state of quiescence.

=== Shareholdings ===
- Difesa Servizi S.p.A. (100%), in-house company founded in 2010 in order to manage assets and services derived from the economic activities of the Ministry.

== Palaces of Armed Forces ==
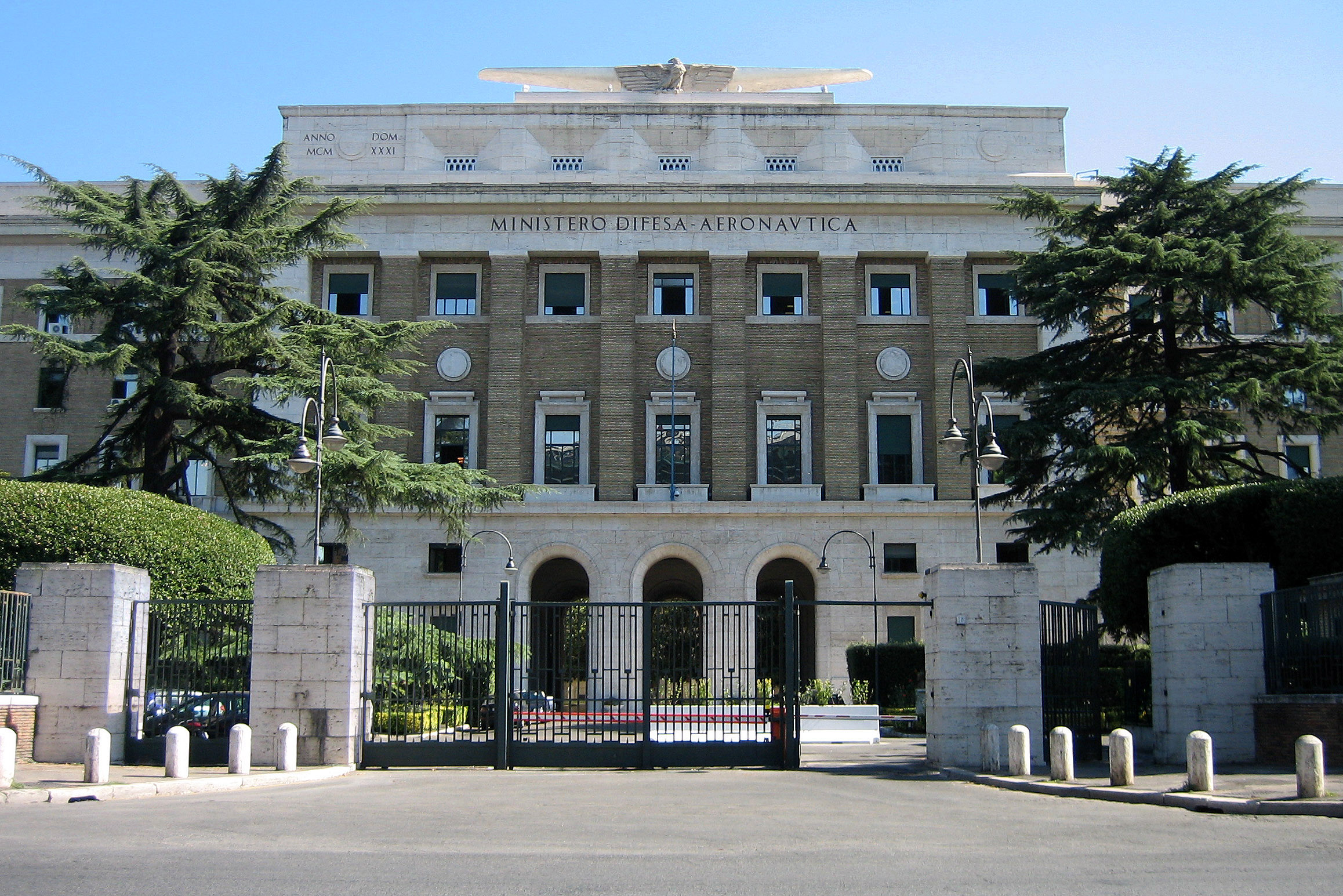
Palazzo dell'Aeronautica, headquarters of Military Air Force Staff.

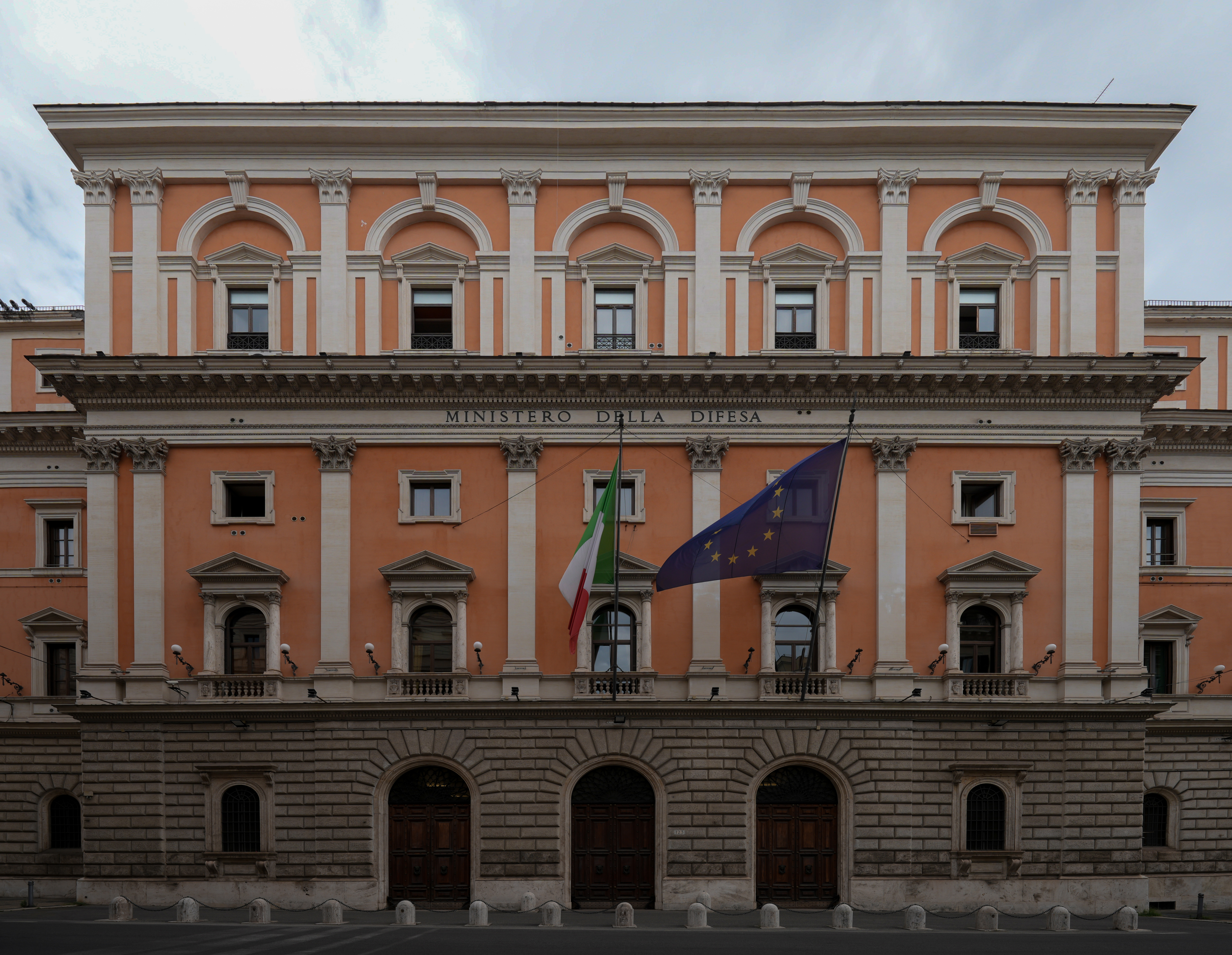
Palazzo Esercito, headquarters of Army Staff and, since 2017, of the Defence Staff.

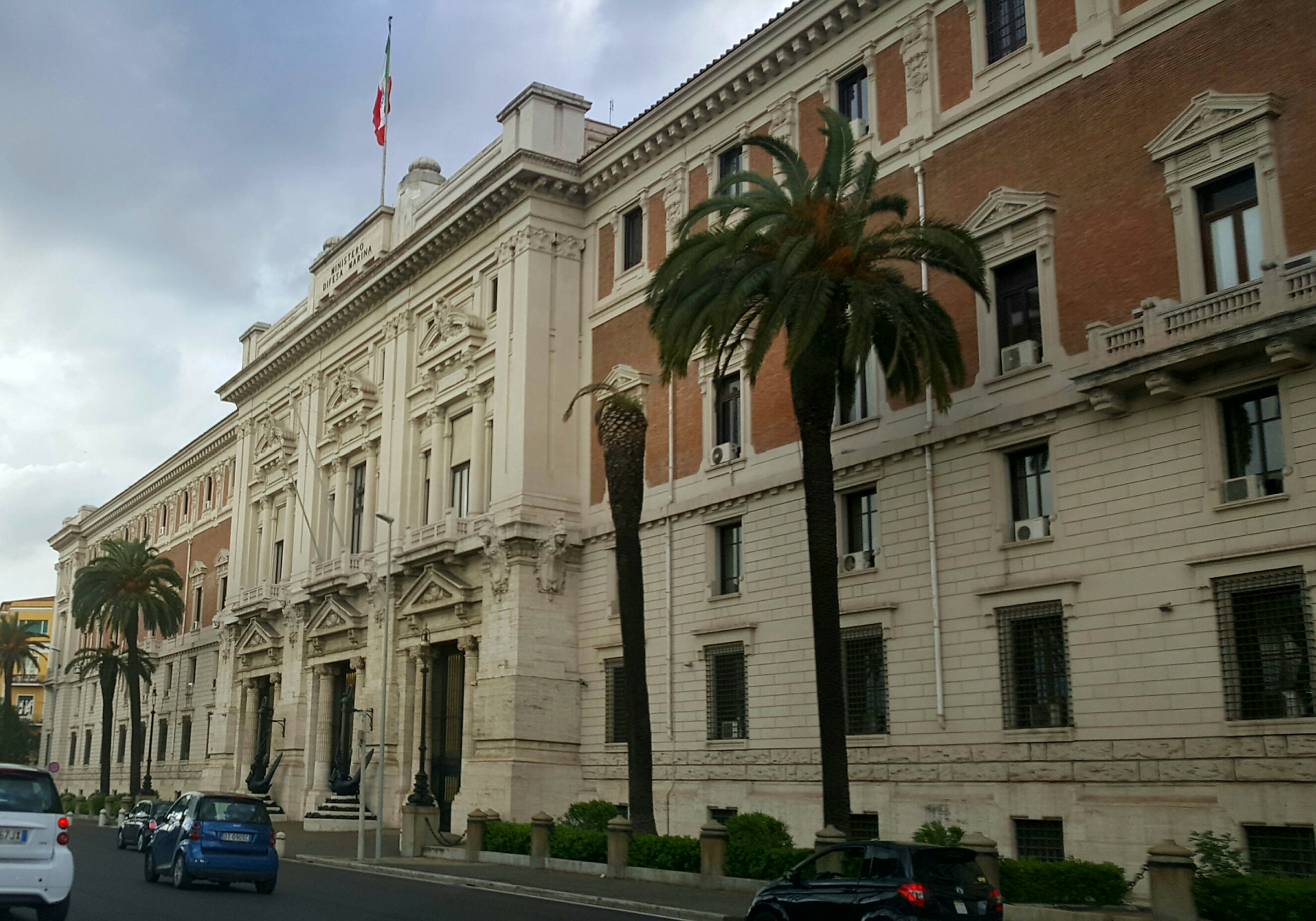
Palazzo Marina, Naval Staff headquarters.

== See also ==
- Government of Italy
- Italian Armed Forces
- Italian Minister of Defence
- President of Italy

== Bibliography ==
- "Constitution of the Italian Republic" (PDF). Senato della Repubblica. 1947.
