= Enrico Paulucci =

Italian painter (1901–1999)

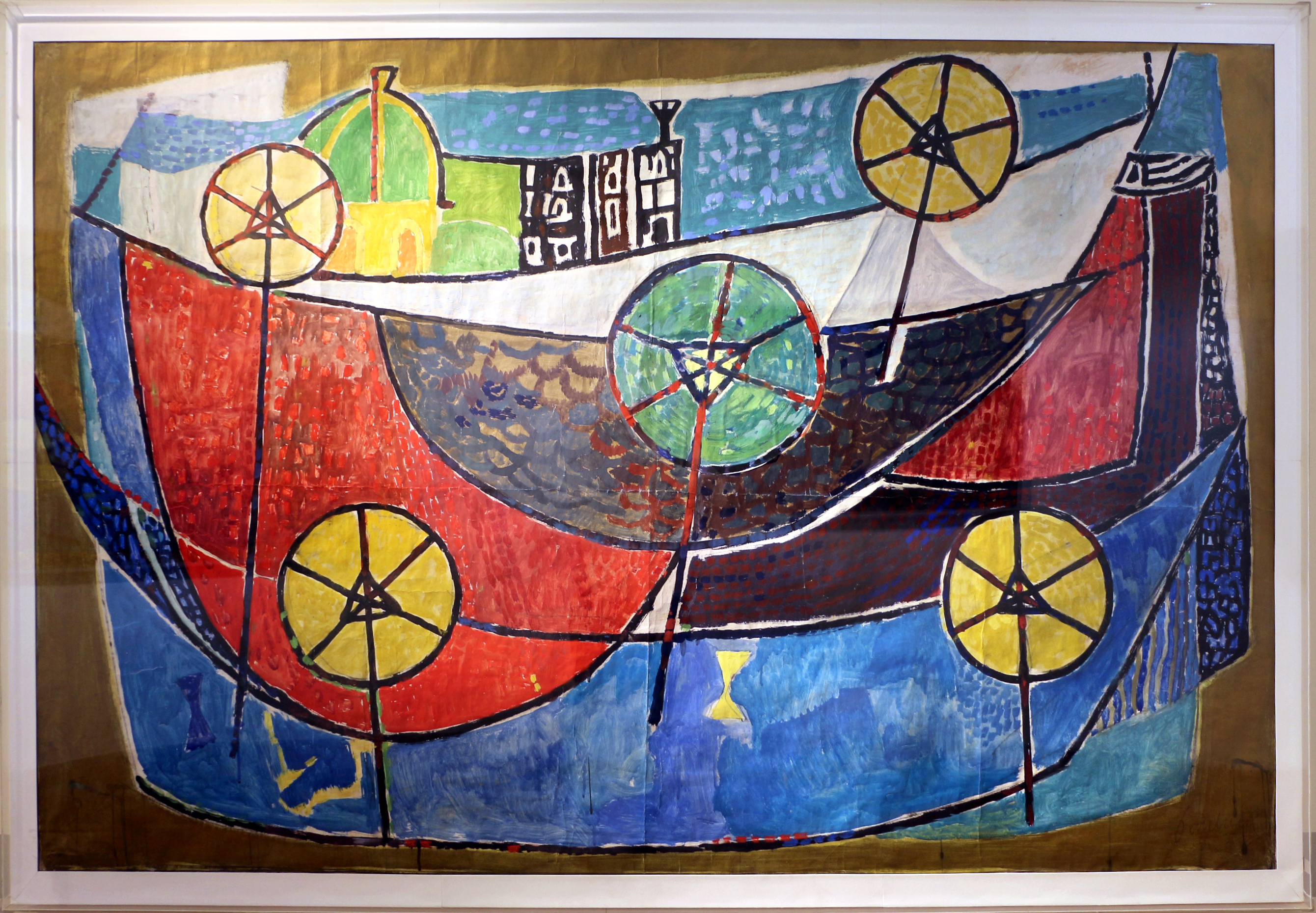
- Enrico Paulucci, Senza titolo, 1955-59
- Born: Enrico Paulucci delle Roncole; October 13, 1901; Genoa, Kingdom of Italy
- Died: August 22, 1999 (aged 97); Turin, Italy
- Education: Regia Scuola superiore di studi applicati al commercio; University of Turin
- Movement: Expressionism, Gruppo dei Sei
- Spouse: Teresa Maccagno (m. 1939; died 1999)
- Parent(s): Paolo Paulucci and Amalia Paulucci (née Mondo)
- Patrons: Felice Casorati; Riccardo Gualino

Enrico Paulucci or Paulucci delle Roncole (1901–1999) was an Italian painter and scenic designer. He was one of the founding members of the Gruppo dei Sei.

== Biography ==
Born in Genoa in 1901, Enrico Paulucci moved to Turin in 1911, where he graduated in economics in 1924 and in law in 1927. He was briefly associated with the Turin group of “second generation” Futurists which included the painters Fillìa, Enrico Prampolini and Ugo Pozzo.

In the mid-1920s he met Felice Casorati, one of the most important artistic personalities in Turin at the time. In 1928 he moved to Paris, where he resided for nearly a year. In the same year one of his paintings was chosen for the Venice Biennale.

By 1929 he was back in Turin, where he founded the "Gruppo dei Sei" ("Group of the Six") along with his friends Jessie Boswell, Gigi Chessa, Nicola Galante, Carlo Levi and Francesco Menzio. The group looked for intellectual freedom and independence, at odds with the dominant Fascist ideology. It was championed by Riccardo Gualino, a wealthy patron of the arts, and by the art critics Edoardo Persico and Lionello Venturi, signers of the Manifesto of the Anti-Fascist Intellectuals of 1925 and one of the few public figures who had refused to swear allegiance to the regime in 1931.

Through Persico, Paulucci contributed several articles for the monthly architectural magazine Casabella. His paintings from this period show his interest in expressionist art, especially the work of Henri Matisse and Raoul Dufy.

The first joint exhibition of the "Gruppo dei Sei" took place in the spring of 1929 at Galleria Guglielmi in Turin. Although each artist had an individual style, they were linked together by the influence of Parisian Post-Impressionism and fauvism, including the work of Amedeo Modigliani, and their anti-fascist ideology – a position that set them apart from other movements like Novecento Italiano and Futurism. In 1930 and 1931, exhibitions of the "Gruppo dei Sei" took place in Paris, London, and Rome.

In the early 1930s, Paulucci founded, together with Casorati, the "studio Casorati-Paulucci," which also served as an art gallery. In 1931, together with his friend Carlo Levi (soon to be exiled to Aliano for his anti-fascist views), Paulucci designed the film settings for Gennaro Righelli's comedy "Patatrac", one of the first Italian sound films. In the 1930s he befriended the American poet Ezra Pound, then sojourned in Rapallo. Paulucci made a sketch of the poet as he promenaded the seafront.

In 1940, Paulucci took up the position of professor of painting at the Accademia Albertina of Turin. In 1948, he realized the scenery and costumes for Darius Milhaud's Les Malheurs d'Orphée, staged at the Teatro La Fenice in Venice. Paulucci was appointed director of the Albertina in 1954. In 1963, he was appointed president of the Italian Committee of the International Association of Plastic Arts. A special show of his work was staged for him at the XXVIII Venice Biennale.

Enrico Paulucci died in Turin in 1999.

== Honors ==
Hawards
Gold Medal of Merit for Culture and Art

== Bibliography ==
- Turina, Stefano (2014). "PAULUCCI DELLE RONCOLE, Enrico". Dizionario Biografico degli Italiani (in Italian). Vol. 81: Pansini–Pazienza. Rome: Istituto dell'Enciclopedia Italiana. ISBN 978-88-12-00032-6.
- "Paulucci, Enrico". Enciclopedia Treccani (in Italian).
- Viale, Vittorio (1965). I Sei di Torino: 1929-1932: Torino, Galleria Civica d'Arte Moderna, September-October 1965. Turin: F.lli Pozzo-Salvati-Gros Monti e C. Poligrafiche Riunite. Texts by Giulio Carlo Argan, Carlo Levi, Enrico Paulucci delle Roncole.
- Persico, Edoardo (1964). "I Sei di Torino". Tutte le Opere (1923-1935). Milan: Edizioni di Comunità: 356–371.
- Andreotti, Libero, Art and politics in fascist Italy. The exhibition of the fascist revolution (1932), Ph.D. diss., MIT, 1989, pp. 203–206.
- Ventavoli, Lorenzo (2006). Conversazioni con Enrico Paulucci. In: Della Casa, S. and Prono, F. (eds.), Contessa di Parma. La Modernità a Torino negli anni trenta, Rome: Fondazione Archivi del '900. pp. 147–166.
- Laura Riccio; Marzia Ratti; Pia Spagiari, eds. (2009). Enrico Paulucci. Se non dipingo non sono. Milan: Silvana Editore Spa. ISBN 978-8836614332.
