= Gruppo dei Sei =

Gruppo dei Sei (Group of Six) or Sei di Torino (Six from Turin) was a group of painters who emerged under the mentorship of Felice Casorati in Turin in the late 1920s.

== History ==
They exhibited together for three years starting in 1929. Although each artist had an individual style, they were linked together by the influence of Parisian Post-Impressionism and Fauvism, including the work of Amedeo Modigliani, and their anti-fascist ideology – a position that set them apart from other movements like Novecento Italiano and Futurism.

The six artists in the group were:

- Jessie Boswell (Leeds, 1881 – Moncrivello, 1956),
- Gigi Chessa (Turin, 1898 – Turin, 1935),
- Nicola Galante (Vasto, 1883 – Turin, 1969),
- Carlo Levi (Turin, 1902 – Rome, 1975),
- Francesco Menzio (Turin, 1899 – Turin, 1979),
- Enrico Paulucci delle Roncole (Genoa, 1901 – Turin, 1999).

Their association was championed by art critics like Edoardo Persico and Lionello Venturi and contemporary art collector Riccardo Gualino who, together with his wife, had purchased a theater in Turin where he was endorsing avant-garde music concerts, dances, art events and plays.

The six artists first exhibited together in the spring of 1929 at Galleria Guglielmi in Turin. In November of the same year they had two other shows at Circolo della Stampa in Genoa and at Galleria Bardi in Milan (later to be known as Galleria Il Milione). A combination of personal and political disagreements eventually contributed to splitting the group apart, along with Gualino's decision to withdraw his financial support following the Wall Street crash of 1929 and his being put under house arrest by Benito Mussolini's government. Levi, Menzio, and Paulucci delle Roncole continued to exhibit together until 1935.

== Bibliography ==
- Boswell, Jessie (1965). Sei di Torino: opere recenti. Turin: Galleria d'Arte La Bussola. Exhibition catalogue.
- Bovero, Anna (1965). Archivi dei Sei pittori di Torino. Rome: De Luca.
- Viale, Vittorio (1965). I Sei di Torino: 1929-1932: Torino, Galleria Civica d'Arte Moderna, September-October 1965. Turin: F.lli Pozzo-Salvati-Gros Monti e C. Poligrafiche Riunite. Texts by Giulio Carlo Argan, Carlo Levi, Enrico Paulucci delle Roncole.
- Gilpi, Antonella (1993). I Sei Pittori di Torino 1929-1931: Mole Antonelliana, Turin 6 May – 4 July 1993. Milan: Gruppo Editoriale Fabbri.
- Bandini, Mirella (1993). I sei pittori di Torino 1929-1931. Milan: Fabbri.
- Bandini, Mirella (1999). I sei pittori di Torino: 1929-1931. Aosta: Musumeci.

== Gallery ==
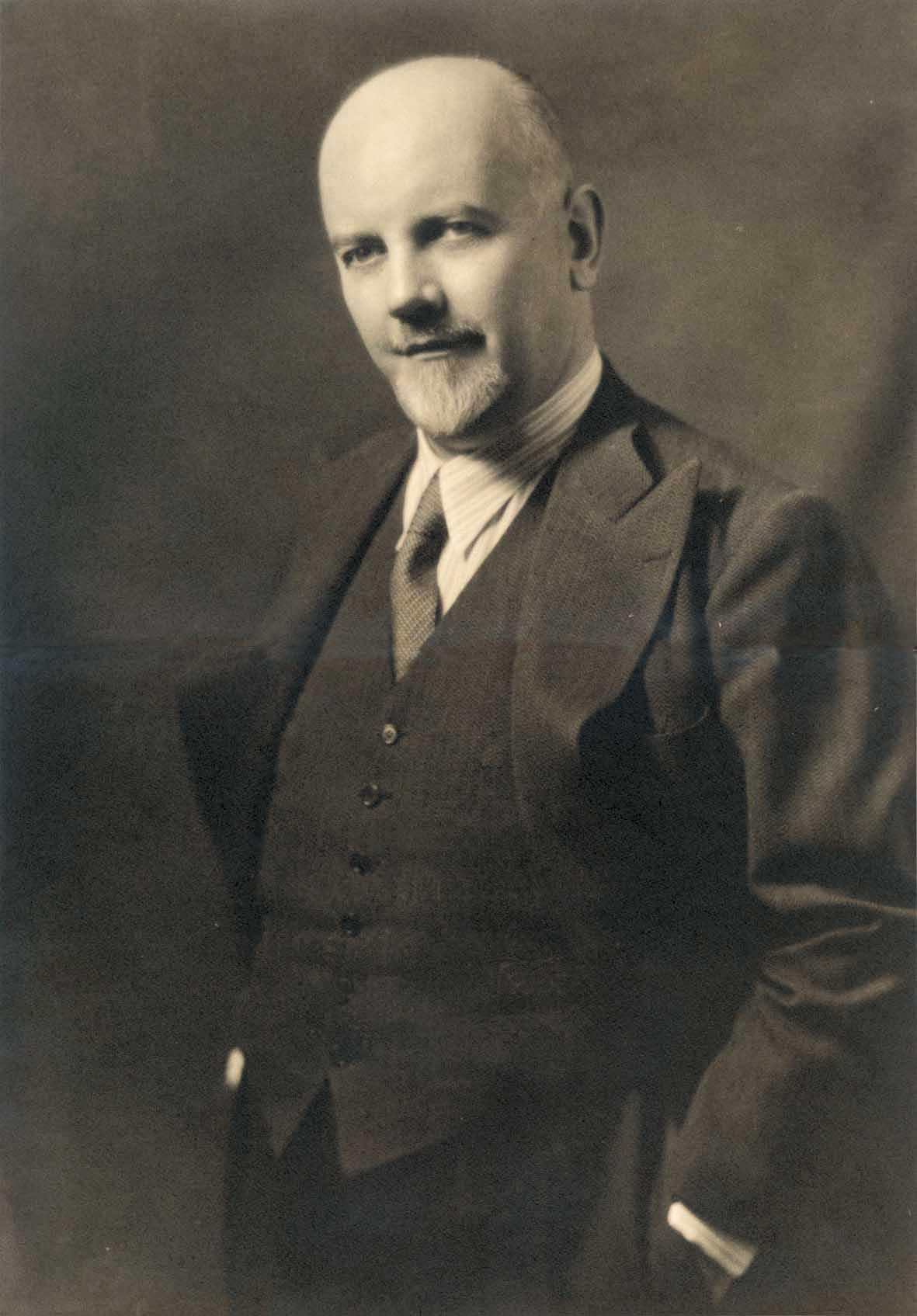
Lionello Venturi

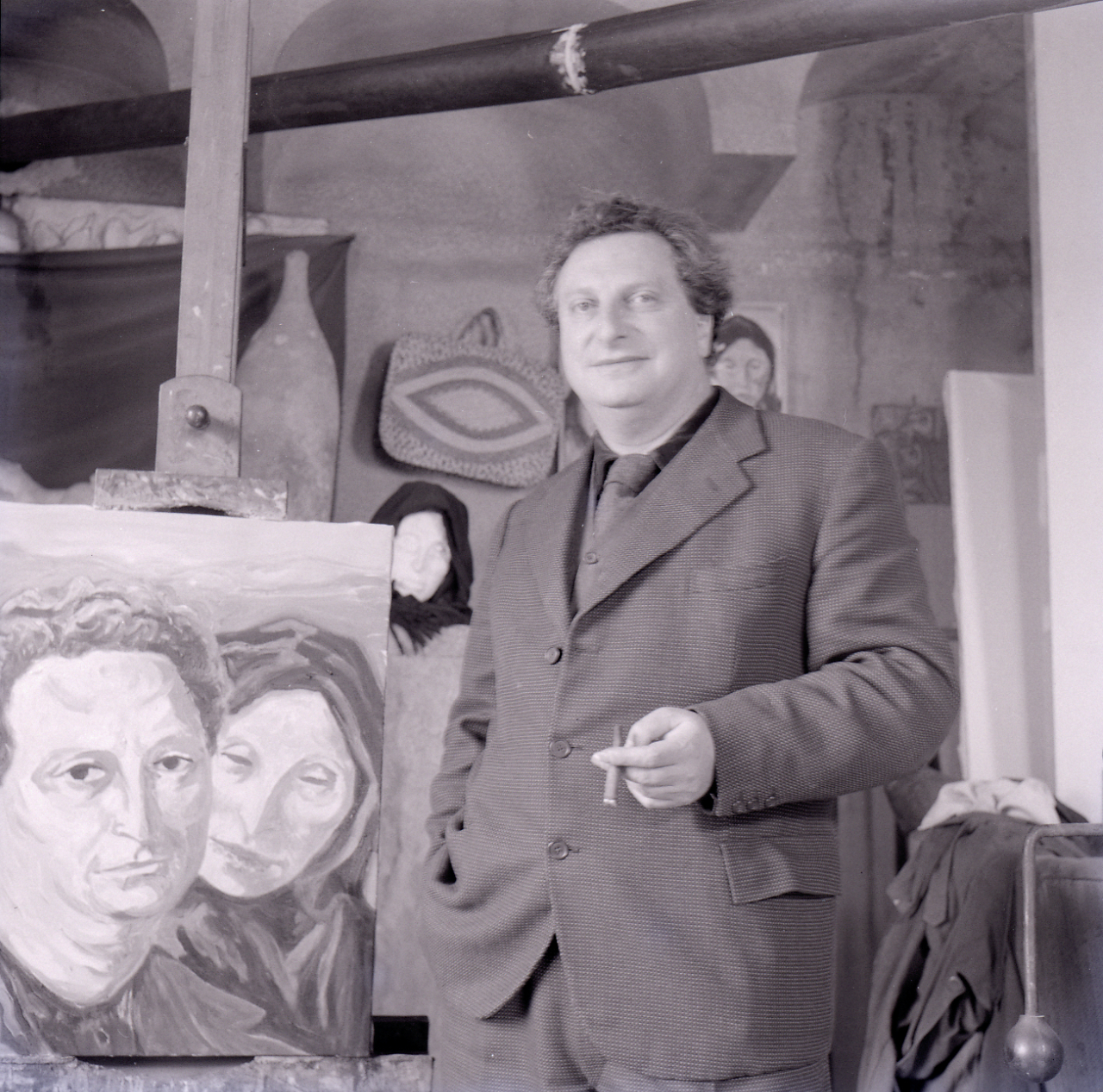
Carlo Levi in his studio

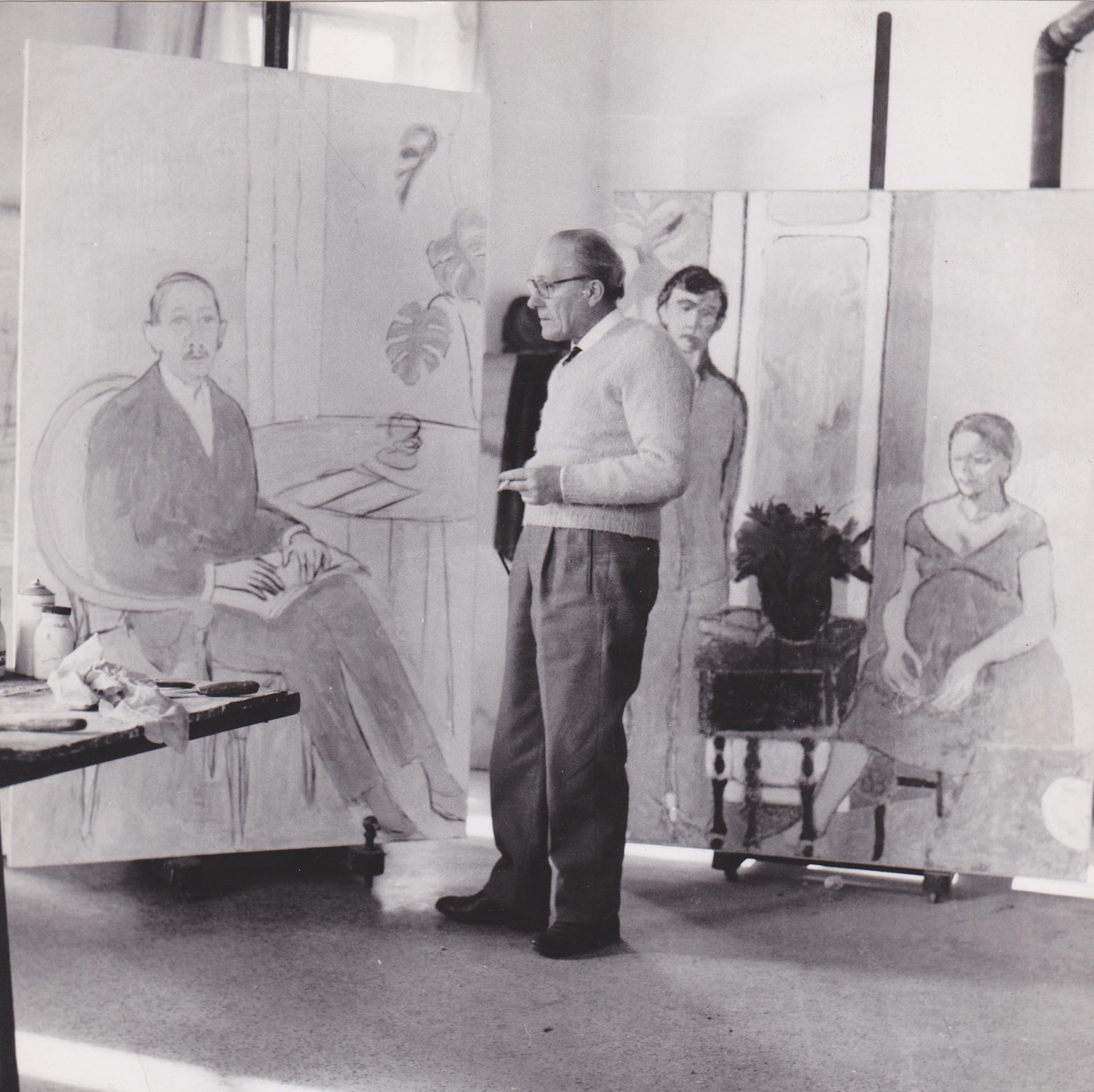
Francesco Menzio in his studio
