= Gigi Chessa =

Italian painter

Luigi Maria Giorgio Chessa (1898–1935) was an Italian painter, architect, scenic designer, and potter (ceramics painter).

== Biography ==
He was born in Turin, where he first trained under his father Carlo Chessa. He attended the Accademia Albertina, first training under Agostino Bosia, but later he was a pupil and protege of Felice Casorati. In 1920, he moved to Anticoli Corrado. By 1922, he began a long collaboration with the "Lenci" company of Turin producing ceramics.

In 1925, he helped design the sets for the presentation in Turin of L'Italiana in Algeri. In 1926, he traveled to New York to design sets for the Metropolitan Theater. The next year he was made professor of Scenography for the Scuola Superiore di Architettura of Turin. In 1927, he participated in the III Biennale di Monza, and at the Exposition d'Artistes Italiens Contemporaines in Geneva, and the Promotrice of Turin. In 1928, he exhibited at the Venice Biennale.

In 1929, he was one of the founders of the Gruppo dei Sei of Turin, a group of expressionist painters active mainly in Turin. The group was formed of Jessie Boswell (1881–1956), Nicola Galante (1883–1969), Carlo Levi (1902–1975), Francesco Menzio (1899–1979), and Enrico Paulucci Delle Roncole (1901–1999). The group exhibited together for about two years, and dissolved after criticism from fascist authorities. He continued to exhibit during the early 1930s, until his death from tuberculosis in 1935, in Turin. His widow, and mother of his two children, would later marry Menzio.
