= Jessie Boswell =

English painter (1881–1956)

Jessie Boswell (March 10, 1881 – September 22, 1956) was an English painter, active mainly in her adoptive Piedmont, known as being one of the painters of the Gruppo dei Sei Pittori (1929–1931) in that city.

== Biography ==
She was born in Leeds, England, but trained in painting under Felice Casorati and design under Mario Micheletti in Turin. She is said to have moved to study music in Italy starting in 1906, joining her sister Geltrude who had married the prominent banker, Gaudenzio Sella.

By 1912, she had a series of designs completed in Biella. In 1916–1918, she began working for the Casa Gualino, as a designer until the 1940s. She is described as being a dama di compagnia (personal assistant/chief of staff) at Casa Gualino from 1913 to 1928. She lived with the family at the Castello di Cereseto and was close to Riccardo's wife, Cesarina Gualino. Riccardo Gualino, a rich industrialist, was also a patron of the arts, including Casorati, and later of the Gruppo dei Sei until his financial collapse starting in 1929.

She exhibited at the Venice Biennali from 1924 to 1930. In 1929–1931, she displayed her works along with a group dubbed the Gruppo dei Sei, including Gigi Chessa, Nicola Galante, Carlo Levi, Francesco Menzio, and Enrico Paulucci. Boswell's work shows a strong influence of Matisse and the simplified compositions of Amedeo Modigliani. The group shared post-impressionist and yet expressionist styles of painting; Jessie's subjects included landscapes, cityscapes, marine scenes, portraits, and still lifes.

Boswell's patron was confined by the Mussolini government for years. Jessie, however, became an Italian citizen in 1936 and spent the second world war in the country. She had a personal exhibition in Biella in 1944. In 1948, she retired to a nursing home in Moncrivello, where she would die.
