= The Rest (The Red Cart) =

Painting by Giovanni Fattori

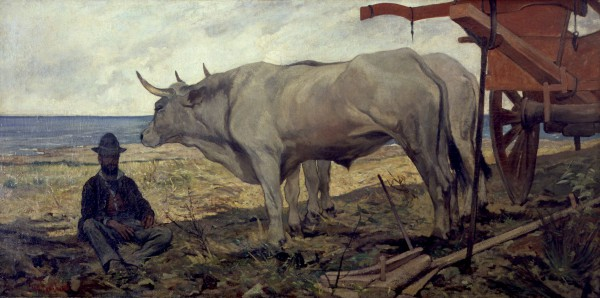
- Artist: Giovanni Fattori
- Year: 1887
- Medium: oil on canvas
- Dimensions: 88 cm × 179 cm (35 in × 70 in)
- Location: Pinacoteca di Brera; Milan

The Rest (The Red Cart) is an oil on canvas painting by Italian painter Giovanni Fattori, from 1887. It was considered by Fattori himself as one of his best works. It is held in the Pinacoteca di Brera, in Milan.

== Description ==
The painting depicts a tired farmer resting seated in a field after having unharnessed the oxen. The elements in the canvas are positioned on a diagonal that joins the vertex at the bottom left to the one at the top right, and the colors used are substantially the primary ones: the cart is red, while the field is yellow and the sea blue.

The cart with its abandoned plow can just be glimpsed; the oxen dominate the center of the composition, while the farmer on the left is pyramidal in form.

The landscape of this hot summer afternoon in the Tuscan Maremma is majestic and solitary.

== Provenance ==
The painting was shown in the same year it was created at the National Exhibition, in Venice, in 1887. It was afterwards bought for the art collection of Riccardo Gualino, considered one of the most important of Italy. It was acquired from that collection for the Pinacoteca di Brera, in 1937.
