= Francesco Menzio =

Italian painter (1899–1979)

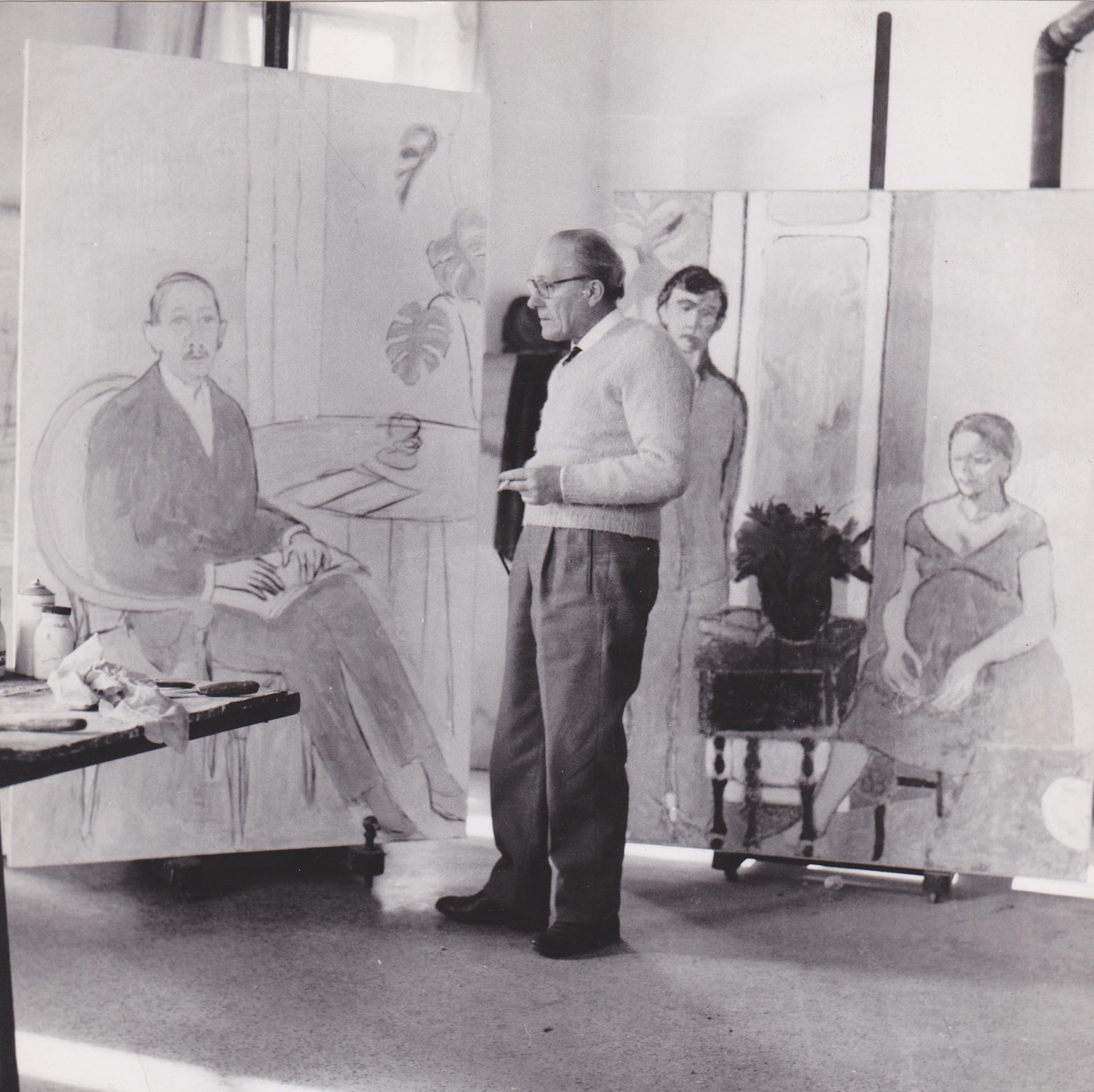
Francesco Menzio in his studio, late 1950s

Francesco Menzio (3 April 1899 – 28 November 1979) was an Italian painter.

== Childhood and training ==
He was born in Tempio Pausania, Sassari in Sardinia, to Pietro Angelo Menzio, a high school teacher, and Augusta Pic, both originally from Piedmont. He and his five siblings spent their childhood following the father in his frequent work moves. They moved to L'Aquila when Augusta, the mother, died in 1902. They finally settled in Turin in 1912, where Pietro Angelo married his second wife Argia Avetrani.

In Turin, Francesco completed his high school and enrolled for a year at the Accademia Albertina di Belle Arti, after which he completed his art training by himself. He served in the Army in the Infantry Battalion during the first World War, among the last young men drafted in combat, the so-called "Ragazzi del '99" ("The boys from 1899").

== Career ==
=== Early years ===
Upon his return home, he dedicated himself entirely to painting, making contact with Felice Casorati who would help him greatly in the years to come. In 1921, he participated in an exhibition held at the Mole Antonelliana, organized against the more conservative show of the "Societá Promotrice delle Belle Arti" on display yearly at the Parco del Valentino. In 1922 he was invited to show at the "Esposizione Artistica Piemontese-Sarda" in the town of Alessandria, where he exhibited a self-portrait (Autoritratto, 1922, now in the Civic Museum). In the following year he showed extensively in local and national venues such as the Quadriennale in Turin in 1923, the II Biennale in Rome and the Exhibition of Twenty Italian Artists at Galleria Pesaro in Milan in 1924 and in 1925 at the “Promotrice” in Turin, where he exhibited the Portrait of the Sister (Ritratto della sorella, 1925, now in the Gallery of Modern Art in Turin Galleria d'Arte Moderna di Torino).

In 1926 he was invited for the first time to show in the Venice Biennale and soon after at the First "Mostra del Novecento" and at the "Esposizione delle vedute di Torino" ("The Exhibition of Landscapes of Turin"). In 1927 he displayed 18 paintings in the "Exposition d’artistes italiens contemporains" ("Exhibition of Contemporary Italian Artists") in Geneva with an introduction written by Giacomo Debenedetti. During this period, he cultivated relationships with individuals such as Edoardo Persico; Lionello and Adolfo Venturi; Piero Gobetti (who would die soon after) and his wife Ada Prospero; Mario Soldati; Alfredo Casella; Roberto Longhi; and Riccardo Gualino (who would help the painter economically until the advent of fascism). Thanks to Riccardo Gualino who sponsored the "Teatro di Torino" and Gigi Chessa who designed sets, Menzio got to know foreign artists such as Igor Stravinsky, Sergei Diaghilev and members of the Habima Theater that expanded his vision above the marginality of the Italian art of those years. Gualino's patronage allowed Menzio to visit Paris in 1927, where he established his studio in rue Falguière. He was influenced by Matisse, Bonnard, and Dufy and adopted a post-Impressionist style. In 1928 he participated in the "Exposition of Italian painters", at the "XIVème Salon de L'escalier". At the end of 1928 he was invited again to participate in the Venice Biennale. Mario Soldati reviewed his work in a September 4, 1928, article in La Stampa. In 1929 Menzio resolved to break with the traditional poetics and together with Jessie Boswell, Gigi Chessa, Nicola Galante, Carlo Levi and Enrico Paulucci, they founded the "Gruppo dei Sei" ("Group of the Six") looking for an intellectual freedom and independence criticizing the rising fascist ideology. The group first exhibited at Galleria d'Arte Guglielmi in Turin in January 1929, and soon Menzio had there his first personal exhibition, introduced by Edoardo Persico. In the following months he participated in all of the exhibitions of the "Gruppo dei Sei" (at “Circolo della Stampa” in Genoa and Galleria Bardi in Milan in 1929). After the showcase at the Venice Biennale in 1930, in which Menzio was personally attacked by the fascist establishment, and following a series of international exhibitions at Bloomsbury Gallery in London in 1930, at the Galerie Jeune Europe in Paris and at the Quadriennale in Rome in 1931, the Gruppo dei Sei was dissolved.

In the following years, Menzio's work developed a personal expression; some examples are "Interno" ("Interior"), now at the Galleria d'Arte Moderna di Torino and "Cappello blu", exhibited at the Royal Palace in Milan in 1929, works that showed soft brush strokes and "forms that vanished in the light". Other works such as "Nudo Rosa" or "Figura (con cappello)" (1929; now in private collections, Turin) or "Corridore podista" (1930) show the influence of Henri Matisse and Amedeo Modigliani. Between 1930 and 1931 Menzio continued his personal investigation, marked by experimentalism and restlessness, elements that were present in some paintings such as "Natura morta con ciliegie" (1931; in the Galleria d'Arte Moderna della cittá di Torino), where the rigorous and essential composition is substituted by objects that have restless and defined colors and outlines. Between 1934 and 1935 he created the frescos in the Psychiatric Hospital of Collegno and inside the Church.

In 1936 he installed a room at the Venice Biennale dedicated to his friend Gigi Chessa, who had died the year before of phthisis. In 1938 he married Gigi Chessa’s widow, Ottavia Cabutti, who already had two children: Luciana and Mauro Chessa. Together they had three more: Paolo, Silvia (who died in infancy in 1942), and Eva. In 1937 he had a solo show at the Galleria del Milione in Milan; in 1938, at the Galleria della Cometa in Rome and at the 21st Biennale in Venice.

=== 1930s–1940s ===
In 1942, Menzio's family was staying at Felice Carena's house in San Domenico di Fiesole when the bombardment of the town began. Because of that, the poor health of the newborn Silvia, and of his anti-fascist feelings, he moved the family to the town of Bossolasco, near Turin where Ottavia's family was from. Soon after, Silvia died of pulmonary tuberculosis. The same year he started a collaboration as an illustrator with the publisher Giulio Einaudi, for whom he designed covers for the series of "Narratori Stranieri Tradotti" NST and the "Universale Economica" UE series until 1946. The year ended with Menzio winning the prestigious "Premio Bergamo" award with the painting "La famiglia" ("The Family").

In 1945, right after the liberation, Menzio moved back to Turin where he established, together with Luigi Einaudi, Massimo Mila, Franco Antonicelli, Norberto Bobbio, Cesare Pavese, Ludovico Geymonat, and Natalia Ginzburg the "Unione Culturale" ("Cultural Union") of which he was the first President. He took an active role in the civil and cultural reconstruction of the postwar city, organizing art initiatives and promoting film and theatre events. In 1946 he designed the set for Woyzeck by Georg Büchner, the first theatre event in Turin after the war.

=== Later years ===
In the succeeding years Menzio immersed himself in painting. In 1956, together with Felice Casorati, he was commissioned to paint a fresco depicting the Life of Santa Caterina for the church of San Domenico in Cagliari and in 1958 with the help of his student Piero Martina he painted the ceiling of the Great Hall of the University of Genoa. In 1951 he started teaching painting at the Accademia Albertina in Turin, and the same year he was awarded the Prize of the Italian Republic given personally by the President of the Italian Republic and friend Luigi Einaudi ("Premio del Presidente della Repubblica"). In 1960 he was elected National Academician by the Accademia Nazionale di San Luca in Rome.

Francesco Menzio died in Turin on 28 November 1979, and is buried with his wife Ottavia Cabutti in Bossolasco.
