= Madonna and Child with Angels and Saints =

1440 painting by Filippo Lippi

Annunciation
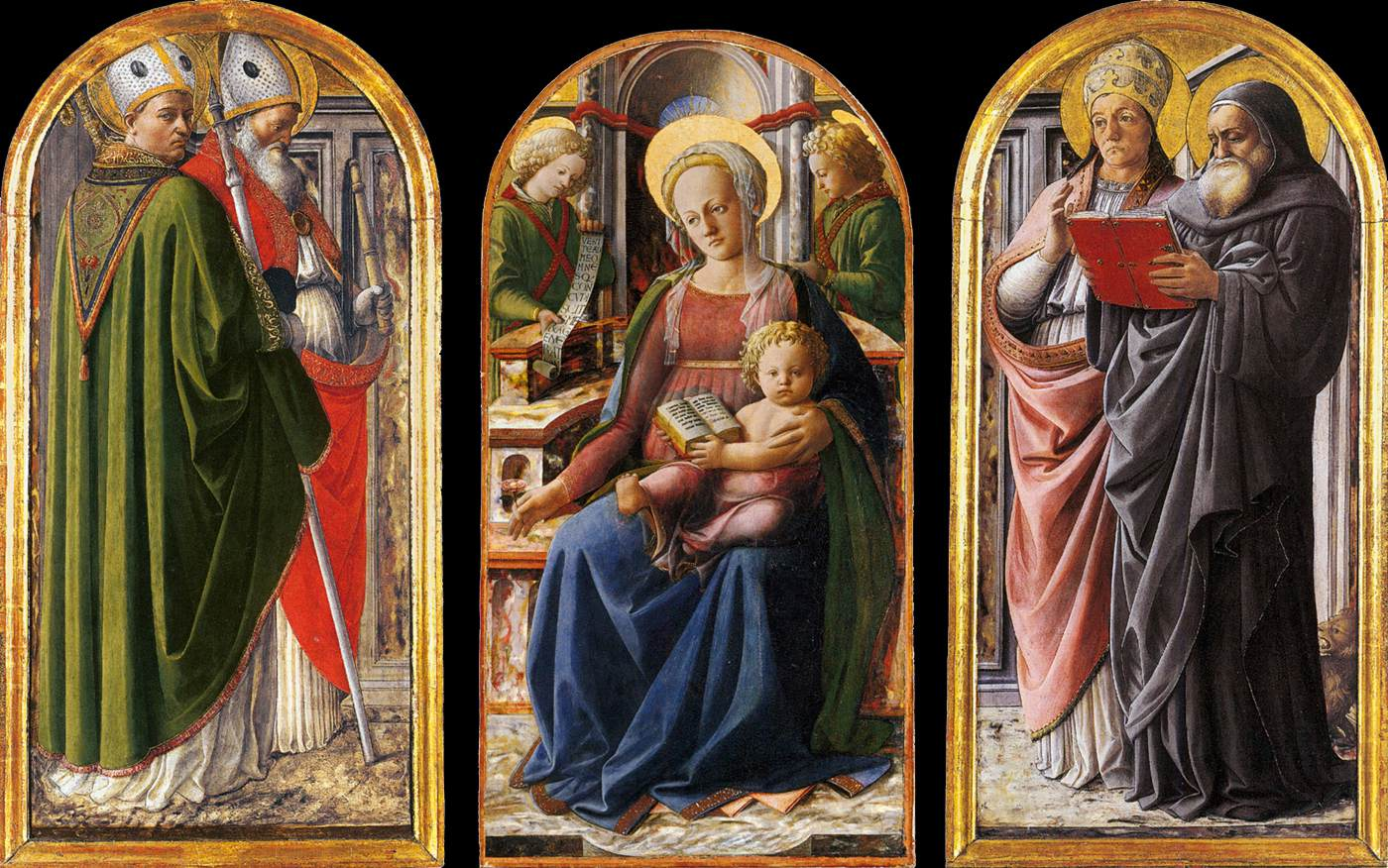
- Artist: Fra Filippo Lippi
- Year: c. 1440
- Medium: Tempera on panel
- Dimensions: each panel: 127 cm × 64 cm (50 in × 25 in) (approx.)
- Location: Accademia Albertina, Turin (wings), Metropolitan Museum of Art, New York (center panel)

Madonna and Child with Angels and Saints was an oil on panel triptych by Filippo Lippi, executed around 1440.

Its central panel has been in the Metropolitan Museum of Art in New York since 1949 and its side panels of Saints Augustine and Ambrose and Saints Gregory and Jerome are both in the Accademia Albertina in Turin. The work was probably split up around the end of the 18th Century. When archbishop Vincenzo Maria Mossi gave his collection to the Accademia in 1828 he only presented the two side panels. The work was reunited at the "Exposition de l'art italien de Cimabue à Tiepolo" in Paris in 1935 and in the "Filippo Lippi. Un trittico ricongiunto" exhibition at the Accademia in October 2004.

== Panels ==
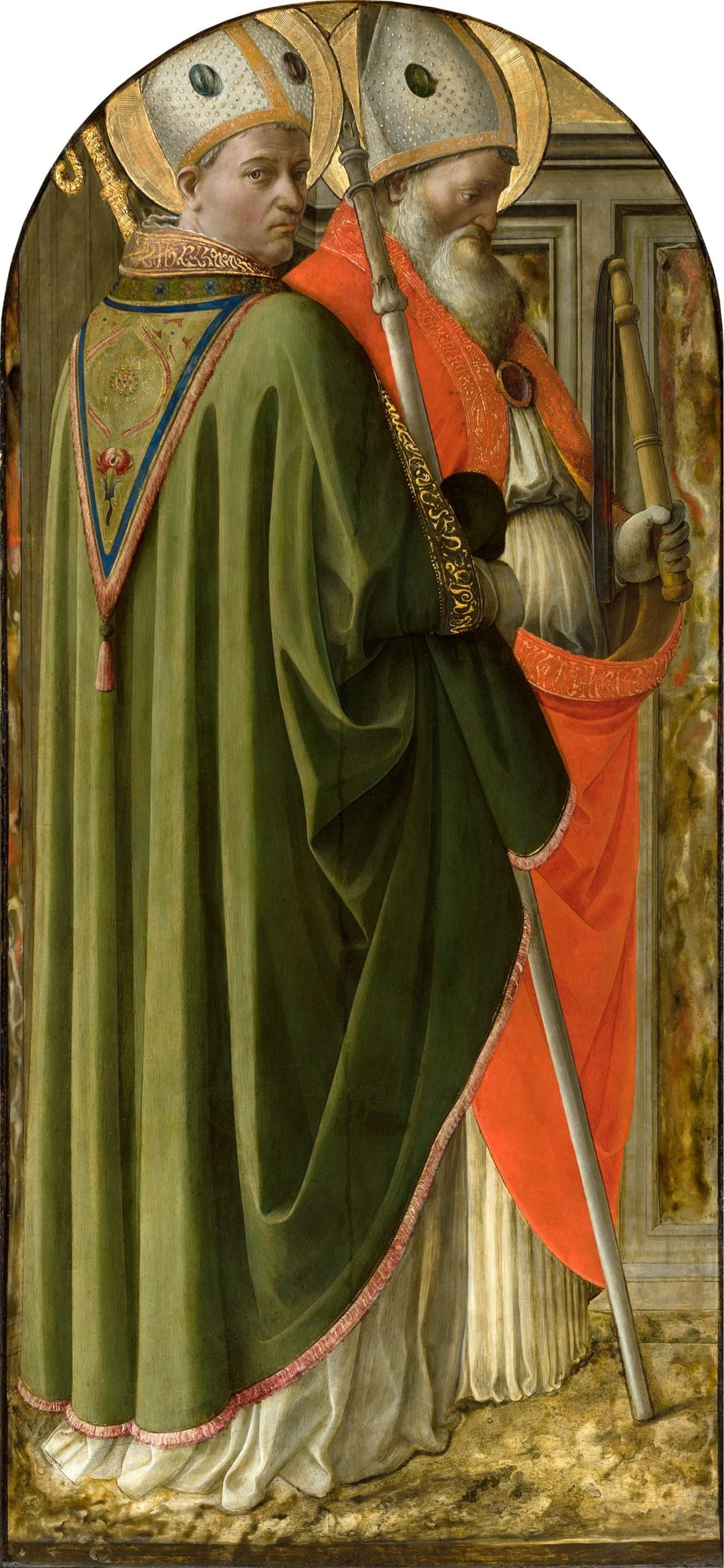

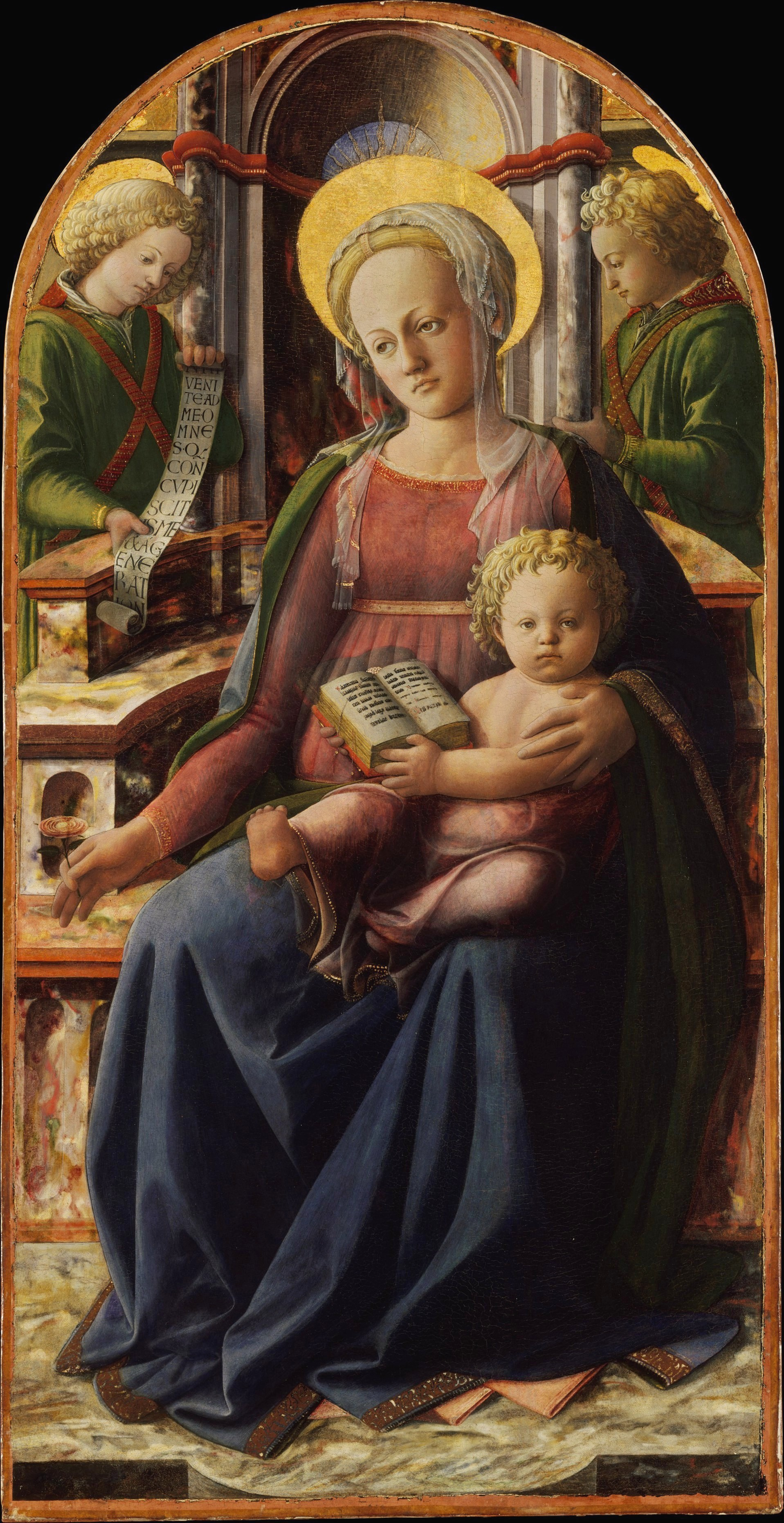

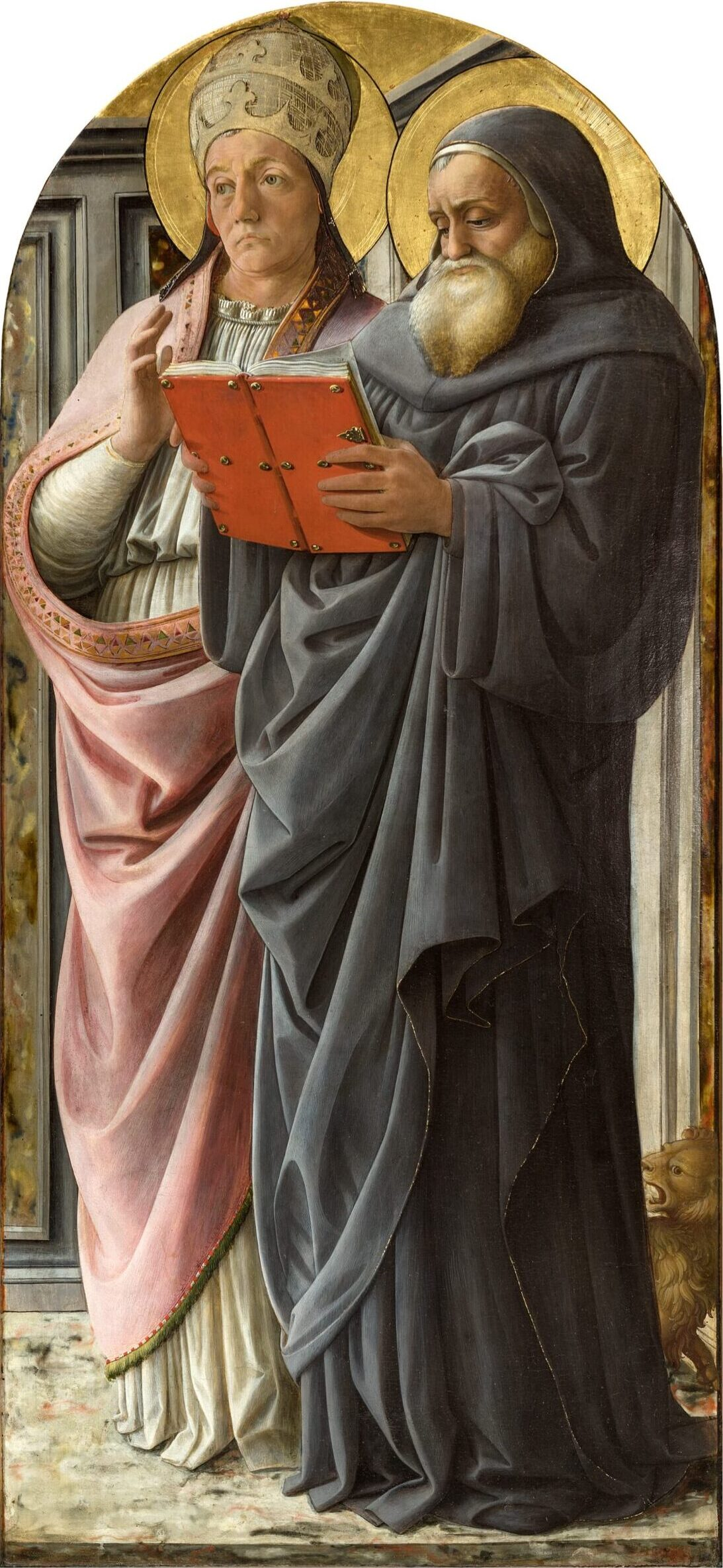
