= Riccardo Gualino =

Italian Business magnate and art collector

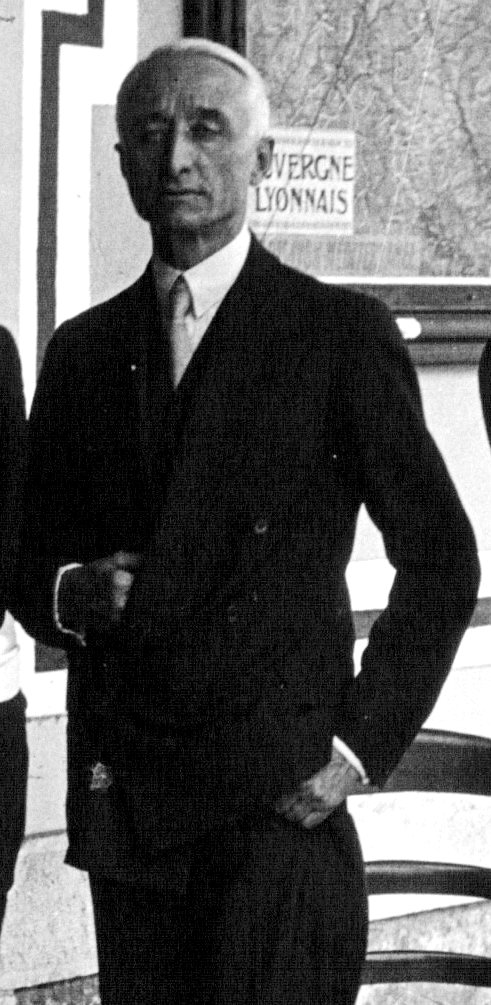
- Gualino in 1931
- Born: 25 March 1879; Biella, Italy
- Died: 6 June 1964 (aged 85); Florence, Italy
- Occupation: Entrepreneur

Riccardo Gualino (25 March 1879 – 6 June 1964) was an Italian business magnate and art collector. He was also a patron and an important film producer. His first business empire was based on lumber from Eastern Europe and included forest concessions, lumber mills, ships and warehouses. The highly leveraged structure collapsed in 1912–13. Gualino was also involved in manufacturing and distributing cement, and during World War I (1914–18) built and operated cargo ships carrying goods such as coal from the United States to Europe. After the war he was engaged in many enterprises, some in partnership with Giovanni Agnelli of FIAT. His activities included banking, manufacture of rayon, confectionery, chemicals and artificial leather.

The Italian economy weakened after a currency revaluation in 1926. Gualino became involved in risky speculations with the French financier Albert Oustric. Their joint enterprises could not survive the world economic crisis of 1929. Gualino failed again in 1930, and lost his freedom for almost two years in 1931–32. He made another recovery after his release and again engaged in a broad range of ventures in various European countries. His Lux Film company produced successful neo-realist films after World War II.

== Early years ==
Riccardo Gualino was born in Biella on 25 March 1879 in the Riva neighbourhood, the tenth of twelve children. (Note: Another source says he was the eighth of ten children. Possibly two siblings died in infancy.) His parents were Giuseppe Gualino, who owned a small jewellery company, and Rina Colombino. The family was moderately well off, and he was able to complete his secondary education, graduating in 1896. He decided not to join his brothers in the family business.

In 1896, at the age of 17, Gualino moved to Sestri Ponente where he found work in the company of Attilio Bagnara, who imported timber from Florida and was the husband of his sister Marta. Riccardo Gualino was employed as a clerk at the sawmill in Sestri and supervised the landings and shipments from Genoa. He performed his military service in 1897. In 1899 he was back in Sestri Ponente, where he worked as a travelling salesman working on commission. He proved to be an able salesman, selling lumber in the north of Italy. Gualino left the company in 1901 when his brother-in-law accused him of doing business on his own account with the clientele. Gualino continued to work as a travelling salesman for various other companies. He managed the import of spruce from Trentino, Tyrol and Carinthia for Ramponi of Milan, and gained useful insight into the forestry business. In 1903 he moved to Casale Monferrato, where he worked as an independent sales representative for his cousin Tancredi Gurgo Salice, a cement trader.

== First business empire ==
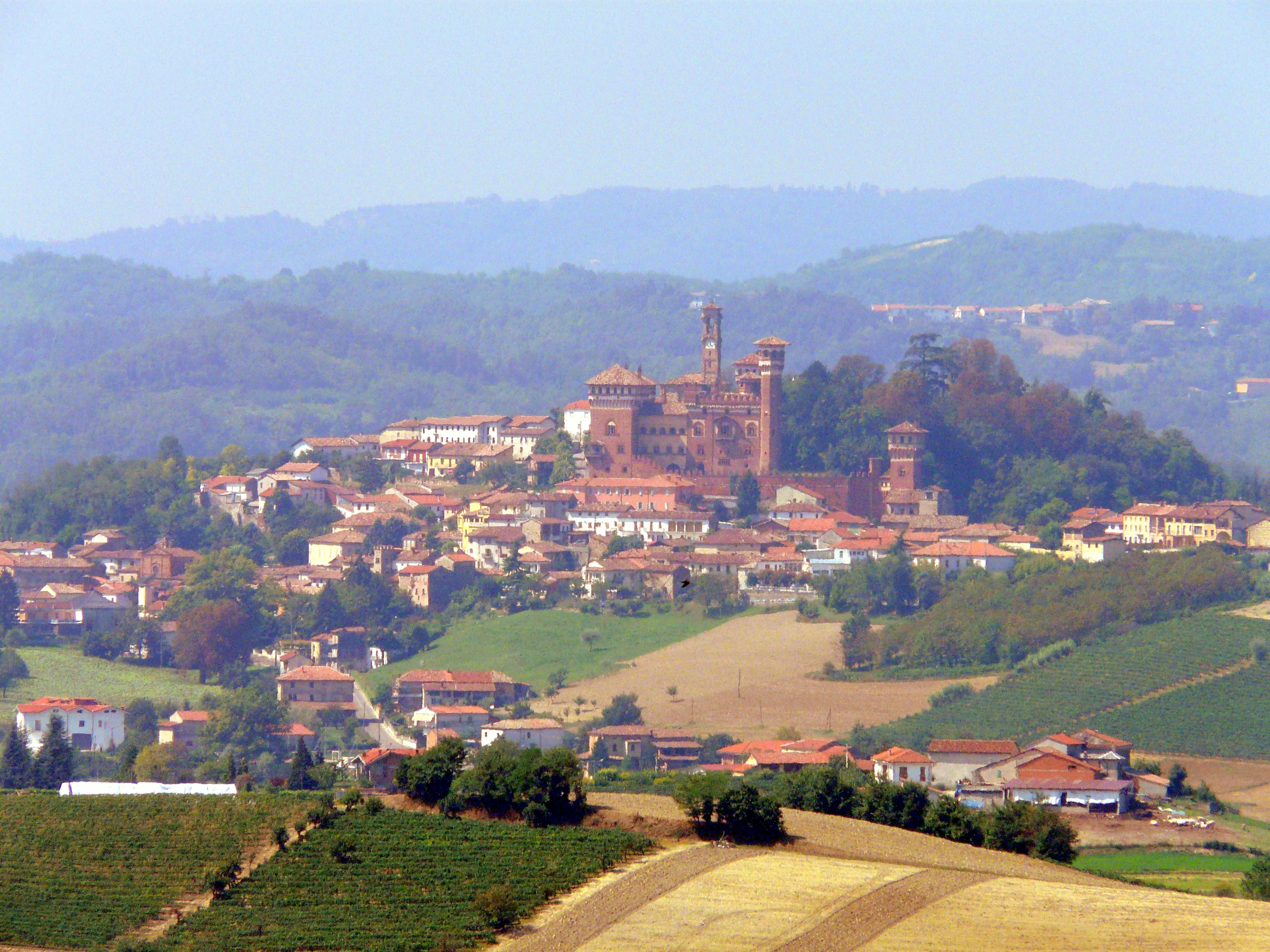
Cereseto, about 50 kilometres (31 mi) east of Turin, dominated by the castle Gualino built there in 1910–13

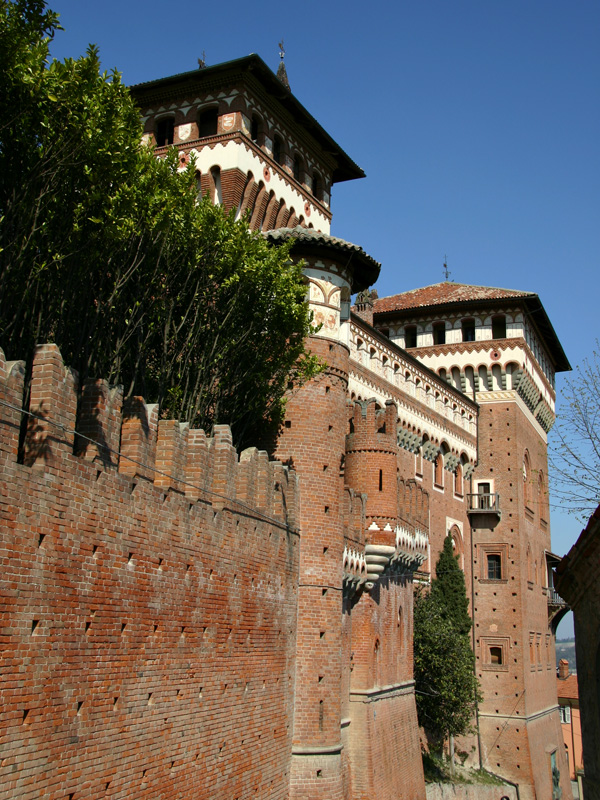
Another view of the Castello di Cereseto

In 1905 Gualino began a limited partnership to trade in lumber with Gurgo Salice's sons Pier Giuseppe and Ermanno. Tancredi Gurgo Salice supplied most of the capital. The partnership imported precious wood from North America, and made huge profits over the next two years. He became involved as a shareholder in a small bank, the Banca agricola di Casale. In 1906 he entered the rapidly growing cement industry. He and Gurgo Salice were founders of the Unione italiana cementi (Italian Cement Union). The company expanded, and in 1912 became the Sindacato nazionale calce e cementi (National Union of Lime and Cement). Gualino always shared management with the family and ran the enterprise on a fairly conservative basis. His fortune came from his dealings in wood. In 1907 Gualino married Gurgo Salice's daughter Cesarina, then aged seventeen, at the Addolorata church in Casale Monferrato. They had two children, Renato and Listvinia (Lilli).

In 1908 Gualino formed the new limited company Riccardo Gualino p. legnami e cementi (Riccardo Gualino Wood and Cement). He made it into a private limited company with capital supplied by Harry Piaggio. It had a capital of five million liras. His partners included Gurgo Salice, some directors of the Banca agricola, L. Ottina of Pisa, who was also engaged in forestry, and Erminio and Gaudenzio Sella of the respected Banca Sella of Biella. The new company at once began a series of large acquisitions in Eastern Europe. In 1908 it obtained a 20,000 hectares (49,000 acres) estate in Volyn in the west of Ukraine and concessions on 7,000 hectares (17,000 acres) of forests in the eastern Carpathian Mountains of Romania. The company obtained an additional concession in Romania the next year and began making large investments in sawmills, roads and other infrastructure.

In 1910 Gualino bought a controlling interest from Baron Armin von Popper in the Forst Union, an indebted company that had various forest properties in the Habsburg Empire and Romania and had a key role in the Austrian forest products export cartel. Gualino hoped to use this position to obtain a discount on the cartel's exorbitant prices but had little success. That year Gualino and his wife launched the construction of a castle with almost 150 rooms in Cereseto, a small village near Casale Monferrato. The Castello di Cereseto, in Neo-Quattrocento Piemont-Lombardy style, was completed in 1913.

Gualino partnered with the Piaggio family to obtain a small fleet of sailing ships to transport the lumber via the Black Sea rather than by road. He also bought the Cantiere lombardo (Lombard Shipyard), which became the Società nazionale legnami e materiali da costruzione (National Timber and Building Materials Company). He began to build a large warehouse on the outskirts of Milan. The business suffered from frequent closures of the sea route through the Dardanelles due to political turmoil. The business empire was heavily indebted, and a bank run in 1912 caused it to collapse. Gualino had to suspend payments in 1913 and assign the company's assets for disposal by a creditor committee that included the Società Bancaria Italiana, the Banca Commerciale Italiana and several large Austrian and German banks.

== World War I ==
In 1915 some minority shareholders of Gualino's failed lumber company brought a lawsuit against him, but he was acquitted for lack of evidence. In 1910 Gualino had founded the Saint Petersburg Land & Mortgage Company, in partnership with the Anglo-Canadian financier Arthur Grenfell, which had acquired a large amount of land at the mouth of the Neva River in Saint Petersburg for housing development. The company had borrowed funds to reclaim land and had erected the first buildings at great expense. This project was suspended at the start of World War I (1914–18) and the property was lost after the Russian Revolution of 1917, as were the estates in Ukraine.

Gualino founded the Società Marittima e Commerciale Italiana in 1914 and the Società di Navigazione Italo-Americana (SNIA) in 1917, two shipping companies. He reentered the timber and building materials markets, invested in land in Rome, became involved in the manufacture of chemicals and moved into the coal trade, which was very profitable during the war. Using his shipping companies, Gualino and Giovanni Agnelli became involved in the transport of US aid to Europe in 1917. They invested in two enterprises in the United States; the Marine & Commerce Corporation of America exported coal and the International Shipbuilding Company made motorized vessels. These companies failed when the war ended. However, the profits from shipping goods to Italy from the United States during the war were the foundation for Gualino's post-war fortune. In 1919 Gualino and his wife made a trip to New York City.

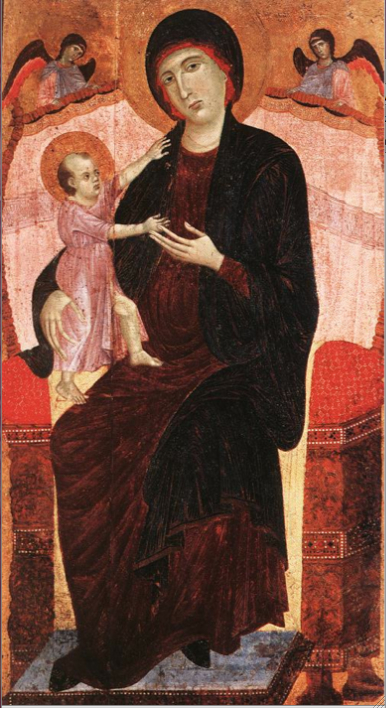
The "Gualino Madonna" by Duccio, from Gualino's art collection

== Sponsor of the arts ==
Gualino was a central figure among a group of intellectuals influenced by Piero Gobetti who had vague but inclusive views about European culture. In June 1922 Gualino moved back to Turin, where he became increasingly interested in modern ballet and decided to help diffuse this form of artistic expression in Italy. In September 1922 his wife, Cesarina, organized a gym in the Castello di Cereseto and persuaded a group of Russian dancers to move to Turin, where they established a dance school and a theatre, the nucleus for a revival of modern ballet. Gualino was the first to introduce choreographic forms other than ballet to Italy. In 1923 he invited Bella Hutter to dance in his private theatre in Turin, and in 1925 invited Mary Wigman to dance in both his private theatre and in his newly opened Teatro di Torino.

Gualino founded the Teatro di Torino in 1925, with a small group of artists and intellectuals. It had a permanent orchestra but did not stage its own productions. Instead, it imported the best theatre available internationally at the time, and gained a European reputation for the quality of its performances. The first performance was of Gioachino Rossini's L'italiana in Algeri (The Italian Girl in Algiers). Concerts staged in the first year included works from the 18th and 20th centuries influenced by Wagnerism and romantic melodrama, a major departure from typical musical performances in Turin. The theatre was informative rather than experimental, showing the range of work available internationally. In this, it was at odds with the nationalist views of the fascist regime, and was unsuccessful with the general public. The theatre was closed in 1931 when Gualino was forced into exile on the island of Lipari.

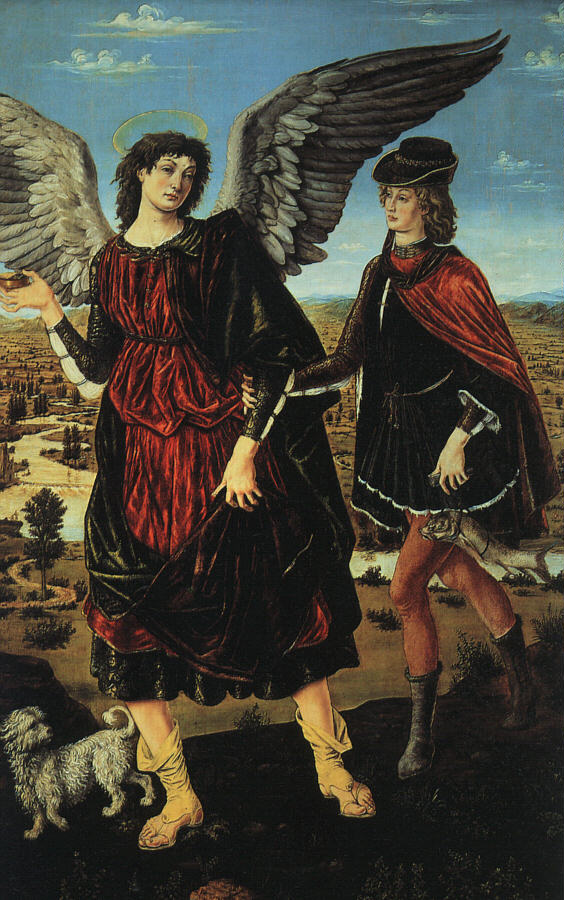
Tobias and the Angel by Antonio del Pollaiuolo

Gualino used his huge wealth to amass a large and valuable collection of art. He met the art historian Lionello Venturi in 1918, who advised him to buy work by Amedeo Modigliani. Gualino was the first Italian to buy work by Édouard Manet with La Négresse, a study for Olympia. Gualino and Venturi supported local painters such as Felice Casorati and the Gruppo di Sei (Group of Six), which included Carlo Levi, Francesco Menzio, Jessie Boswell, Gigi Chessa, Enrico Paolucci and Nicola Galante. These artists could view works by Modigliani, considered pornographic at the time, that Gualino "hung serenely amidst his Titians and Botticellis." In 1930 Venturi organized a retrospective exhibition of Modigliani's work in Venice based on the paintings owned by Gualino.

Gualino saw the Rationalist work of the architect Giuseppe Pagano in an exhibition in 1928. He commissioned Pagano to build his company's headquarters in Turin on Corso Vittorio Emanuele. Pagano and Gino Levi-Montalcini built the Palazzo Gualino in 1928–29, with a flat roof rather than the sloped tile roof typical of other buildings in the city. The building had seven identical low-stacked floors, and unorthodox but functionally rational horizontal windows, conveying a sense of efficiency rather than power. In other ways the Rationalist design carefully combined modern and traditional features.

The Galleria Sabauda (Savoy Gallery) in Turin has a room dedicated to the Gualino collection, which includes Venus and Mars with Cupid and a Horse by Paolo Veronese and Landscape with a pushcart by Peter Paul Rubens. The gallery also holds furniture, rugs, paintings, statues, ceramics, archaeological objects and jewellery from the collection. Other works include Tobias and the Angel by Antonio del Pollaiuolo and Three Archangels and Tobias by Filippino Lippi.

== Second business empire ==
From 1918 Gualino and Agnelli were closely involved in business arrangements that included cross-holdings in Agnelli's Fiat (Fabbrica Italiana Automobili Torino) and Gualino's SNIA. Agnelli and Gualino made an attempt early in 1918 to take over Credito Italiano. This was the second largest of the four mixed banks in Italy at the time, the others being the Banca Commerciale Italiana (Comit), Banca Italiana de Sconto (BIS) and Banco de Roma. These four dominated Italian finance and had stakes in a huge range of companies. Agnelli and Gualino did not succeed but joined the board of directors of Credito Italiano. Gualino made another unsuccessful attempt to take over Credito Italiano in 1920, and one more failed attempt in 1924. In 1920 Gualino and Agnelli participated in the recapitalization of the private bank Jean de Fernex. In 1921 Gualino acquired the Banca agricola italiana, a bank that he used to finance his other ventures. The bank absorbed the Banca agricola di Casale, his pre-war purchase, and various other financial institutions to become a retail bank that often engaged in risky business investments.

Agnelli was vice-president of SNIA from 1917 to 1926. In the early 1920s SNIA began to manufacture artificial textile fibers. Artificial cellulose fibres had been produced before the war, but SNIA was the first to mass-produce rayon. It was given the new name of SNIA Viscosa (Società nazionale industria e applicazioni viscosa, National Rayon Manufacturing and Application Company). In 1921 Gualino acquired Rumianca, which made sodium hydroxide and carbon disulfide, used in the production of artificial fibres by SNIA Viscosa. SNIA Viscosa ran into difficulties during the financial crises of 1921. At the request of Agnelli, Bonaldo Stringher authorized the Banca d'Italia to provide financial help, but Gualino had to sell his stake in Fiat and scale back on his efforts to acquire Credito Italiano. Gualino made huge investments in SNIA Viscosa. By the mid-1920s SNIA Viscosa was the largest company in Italy in terms of capital. By 1926 SNIA Viscosa had become the second-largest rayon producer in the world. The United States produced more rayon in total, but Italy was the world's largest rayon exporter.

Although SNIA Viscosa was his main enterprise, Gualino was also involved in many other businesses, including cement and alcoholic beverages. From 1920 to 1927 Gualino was vice-president of Fiat. In 1920 Gualino and Agnelli bought one-third of the shares of Alfredo Frassati, publisher of La Stampa. Gualino and Agnelli were also involved in a proposal to link Milan, Genoa and Turin with a high-speed railway, and in various projects in cement and automobiles. They brought about 25,000 Sicilians to Turin as industrial workers, particularly around 1925–26, housed them in barracks and subjected them to discipline. The newspapers made much of the crimes committed around Turin by Sicilians who had broken their contracts and left the factories. Other enterprises included the piano maker Fabbrica Italiana Pianoforti. In 1924 he launched the confectionery company Unica (Unione Nazionale Industrie Cioccolato e Affini)

== Decline and failure ==
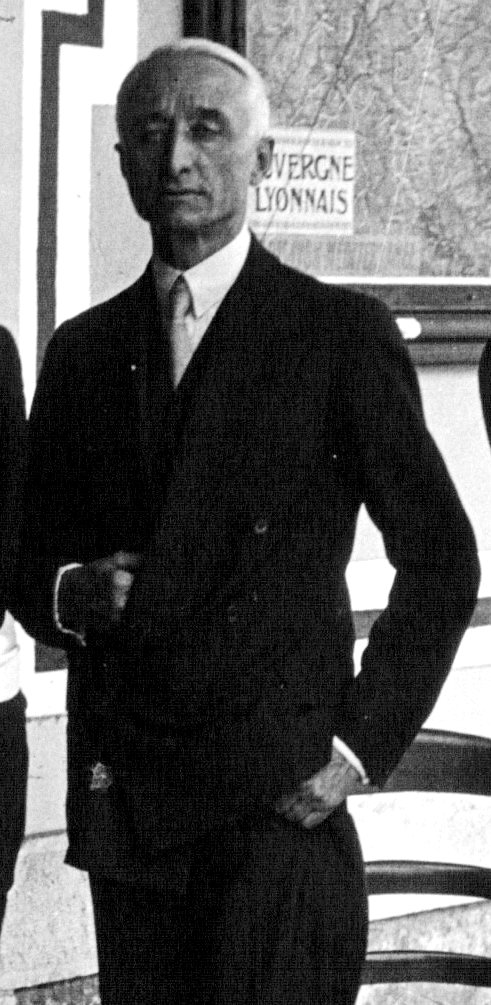
Gualino in 1931

The boom period ended with the Quota 90 revaluation of the lira announced on August 18, 1926.Gualino wrote a blunt letter of protest to Benito Mussolini,

Think that the Italians were pushed to construct, construct, construct, construct; recall that the industrialists were advised to augment their plants to increase exports and were praised for this. And then consider how today those who followed these governmental directives are being punished. They find themselves with factories devalued because of revalued debts, with grandiose plants built and paid for while the pound sterling equaled 125 lire. They must devalue their capital and reduce production without hope of later being able to retake lost ground since, in the meantime, foreign firms are occupying markets which the Italians had conquered with so much effort.

With help from the French banker Albert Oustric and Raoul Péret, the French Minister of Finance, SNIA Viscosa's shares were listed on the Paris exchange in 1926. Gualino became involved in a series of ventures with Ostric, often highly leveraged. The two financiers created Holding française and Holding italiana in 1928, and invested in car companies such as Peugeot and Ford, insurance, textiles, clothing, footwear and retail stores. They built an unstable structure with unsustainable debts. The partnership with Agnelli broke up due to Gualino's investments in the French automobile industry, and Gualino became isolated from the Italian business community.

In 1927–28 Courtaulds and Vereinigte Glanzstoff-Fabriken (VGF) gained control of SNIA Viscosa. A German director of VGF, Karl Scherer, replaced Gualino as head of the firm and cut output drastically. The foreign intervention was seen as humiliating by the fascists. Gualino's speculations with Oustric also ran into financial difficulties, and severe problems emerged with the Banca agricola italiana during the financial crisis of 1929. In 1930 Gualino was forced to sell his share in SNIA Viscosa and many other investments to try to reduce his debt. (Note: By the time Gualino left SNIA Viscosa the company had lost its leadership position, but in 1931 it was the first to manufacture short-fiber flock, and the first to produce cellulose from reeds to eliminate dependence on imported materials.) (Note: The Banca Agricola Italiana was salvaged in the first months of 1930, and in 1932 was taken over by the Banca Nazionale del Lavoro.) His collections of art were dispersed.

Mussolini responded to Gualino's failure by saying he had caused "serious harm to the national economy". Gualino was arrested in Turin in January 1931 and sentenced to five years confino. This was a form of internal exile. He was confined to the Aeolian island of Lipari on charges of fraudulent bankruptcy and suffered the confiscation of all his property. Gualino used his time on Lipari to write the biographical Frammenti di vita (Milan: Mondadori, 1931). Concerned about possible political issues, the publisher sent a copy to Mussolini in August 1931. The Duce somewhat surprisingly gave an unconditional authorization, which he later reconfirmed. The book was a success, with three reprints and a paperback edition.

== Later business operations ==
After an appeal to Mussolini by his wife, Gualino was transferred from the Aeolian Islands to Cava de' Tirreni, where he spent about a month of probation. On 18 September 1932, he was released by order of Mussolini and returned to Turin. He had been banned for ten years from involvement in industry, but this was relaxed after his release. At the end of 1933 he moved to Rome, and regained the shares of one of his former companies, the chemical manufacturer Rumianca. Rumianca, once a subsidiary of SNIA Viscosa, was bought back from the Abegg group. During the 1930s the company prospered as a manufacturer of pesticides and fertilizers. It profited from public financing of Italian industry, and during World War II (1939–45) was involved in mineral refinement, chemical production, soap making, fungicides and a huge pyrite mining complex in Val d'Ossola.

Gualino also had business interests in France, where he had been tried and sentenced in January 1933, but where he still had sizable assets. By the mid-1930s he was engaged in French real estate with the Société anonyme des cafés et restaurants français and in retail with Le Bon Marché. He also headed the Luxembourg-based Consortium privé financial institution. His friend Oustric was active in the Banque de l'Union Parisienne, which supported Gualino in various business ventures in France, Belgium, Romania, Switzerland and Yugoslavia. As an opponent of Fascism, after World War II (1939–45) Gualino was restored to ownership or control of companies that had been taken from him in 1931. He lived quietly in Rome and Florence, while his business empire flourished once more. Rumianca was active in several manufacturing plants in Italy and elsewhere, making products such as cosmetics, toiletries and polymers.

== Filmmaker ==
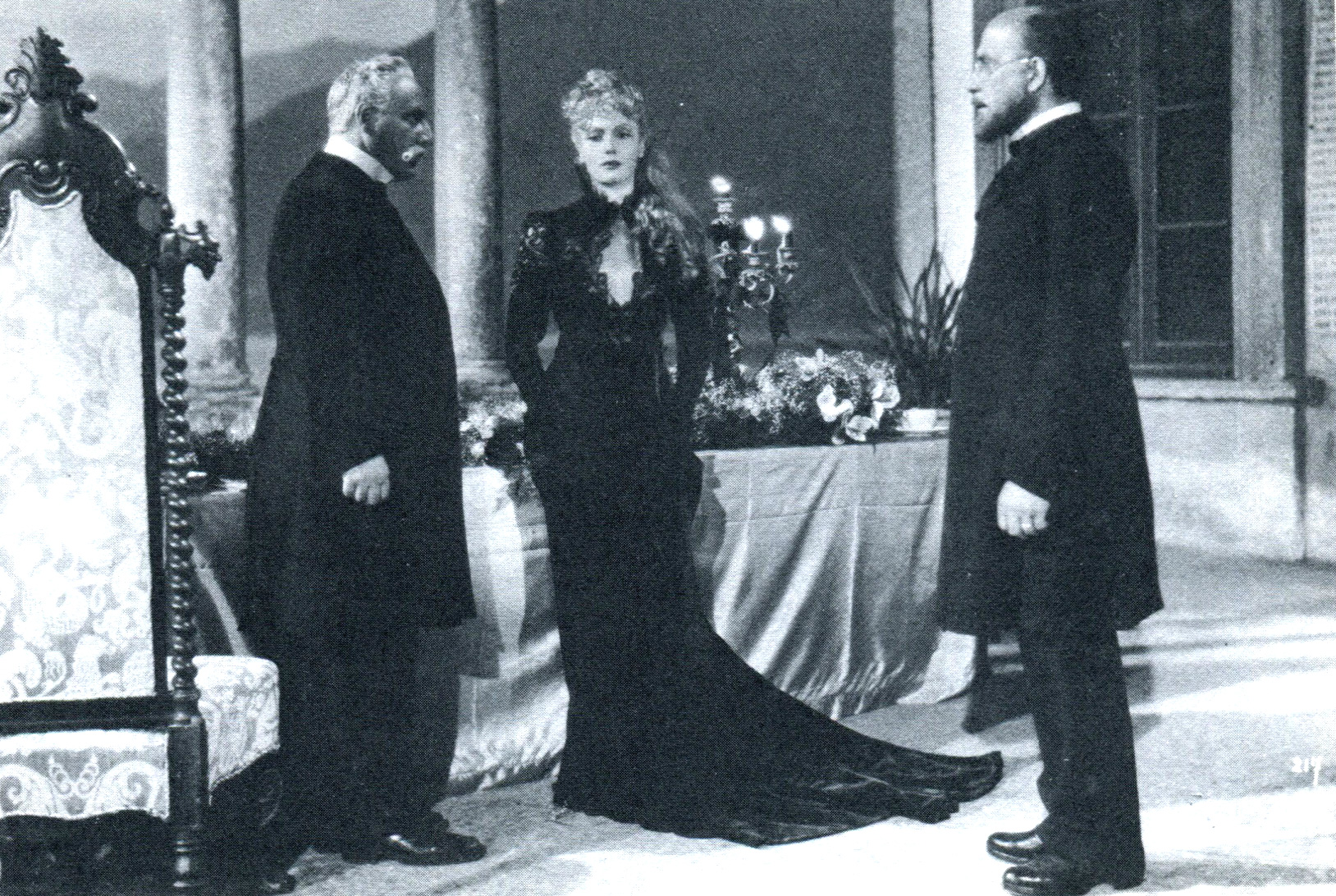
Scene from Malombra (1942, Lux Film)

Gualino took great interest in film, and in 1934 founded two film companies at about the same time, Lux francese and Lux italiana. He collaborated with the musicologist Guido Maggiorino Gatti, who had directed the Teatro di Torino, on his first film, Don Bosco, directed by Goffredo Alessandrini. His film business was helped by the contacts he had made with the intelligentsia in the 1920s, and helped him regain favour with the Fascist government. Lux was at first mainly a distribution company, and while based in Turin made only three productions. It was a subsidiary of Rumianca, and moved to Rome with its parent company in 1940.

Lux treated its employees as freelancers, hired for a specific project. Lux had no studios, but leased premises as needed. Equipment such as lights and cameras were rented from the Rome outlet of Mole Richardson. Producers were invited to propose projects which Lux would fund up to a defined ceiling. The studio imposed financial discipline while giving the producers considerable artistic freedom. Lux also looked after distribution and exhibition and targeted international markets with agencies in the United States and different parts of Europe, South America and the Middle East.

From 1940 to 1944 Lux produced a number of well-received films, often based on literary texts. After the war the studio was very active in production, working with its sister company Lux CCF (Compagnia Cinematografica Francese). The Lux Film office at via Po 36 in Rome, known as Lucchessefilme to workers in the industry, was open night and day. Gualino's office was inaccessible, on the third floor. The artistic manager, Guido Maggiorino Gatto, had his office on the second floor. The independent producers worked from the first floor, under the general manager Valentino Brosio. Federico Fellini spent much time at Lux Films as a writer just after the war, where he met the playwright Tullio Pinelli. Lux produced many successful neo-realist works directed by filmmakers such as Pietro Germi, Alberto Lattuada and Mario Soldati.

Lux producers in the early 1950s included Carlo Ponti and Dino De Laurentiis, who later branched out on their own, Antonio Mambretti, Luigi Rovere and Valentino Brosio. From the early 1950s, Gualino became less directly involved, delegating operations to Guido Gatti and to his son Renato Gualino. However, Riccardo Gualino remained "head of studio" in the 1950s, and acted as both financier and producer. Lux continued to use the system of packaged productions, but some individuals mainly worked for Lux projects.

In 1950 Gualino's son Renato wrote an article in which he said the producer was the "unique, coordinating force in realizing a film". Luchino Visconti, who directed Senso (1954) for Lux, referred to "the old Gualino, my producer, a really good man". Surviving records show that Gualino made many suggestions about the script and scenes, with which Visconti often simply complied. Gualino let his son serve as the studio's public face. Renato was president of the National Producers Association for several years, and in the 1950s was president of the US branch of the Italian Film Export Association (IFE). IFE cooperated closely with Lux. At the end of the 1950s Lux ran into difficulties and had to be recapitalized.

Riccardo Gualino died on 6 June 1964 in Florence at the age of 85. By this time Lux no longer made films but had become purely a distributor.

== Writings ==
- Riccardo Gualino (1931). Frammenti di vita (Fragments of Life) (in Italian). Milan.
- Riccardo Gualino (1932). Uragani. Il romanzo della grande crisi del '29 (Hurricanes. The story of the great crisis of '29) (in Italian). Paris. p. 172.
- Riccardo Gualino (1932). Ma vie et mes entreprises. éditions Denoe͏̈l et Steele. p. 244.
- Riccardo Gualino (1938). Pioniere d'Africa ( Pioneer in Africa) (in Italian). Milan. p. 184.
- Riccardo Gualino (1966). Frammenti di vita e pagine inedite (Fragments of Life and Unpublished Pages) (in Italian). Rome.

== Sources ==
- Adler, Franklin Hugh (2002-04-30). Italian Industrialists from Liberalism to Fascism: The Political Development of the Industrial Bourgeoisie, 1906-34. Cambridge University Press. ISBN 978-0-521-52277-9.
- Amson, Daniel (2000). "La Responsabilité politique et pénale des ministres de 1789 à 1958" (PDF). Pourvoirs (in French) (92). Archived from the original (PDF) on 2015-09-24.
- Bonsaver, Guido (2007). Censorship and Literature in Fascist Italy. University of Toronto Press. ISBN 978-0-8020-9496-4.
- Chiapparino, Francesco (2003). "GUALINO, Riccardo". Dizionario Biografico degli Italiani (in Italian). Vol. 60. Trecanni.
- Cumming, Robert (2015-06-16). My Dear BB . . .: The Letters of Bernard Berenson and Kenneth Clark, 1925–1959. Yale University Press. ISBN 978-0-300-21606-6.
- Donzé, Pierre-Yves; Nishimura, Shigehiro (2013-11-12). Organizing Global Technology Flows: Institutions, Actors, and Processes. Routledge. ISBN 978-1-135-01357-8.
- Eichengreen, Barry (2014-12-20). Hall of Mirrors: The Great Depression, the Great Recession, and the Uses-and Misuses-of History. Oxford University Press. ISBN 978-0-19-939200-1.
- Ghirardo, Diane (2013-02-15). Italy: Modern Architectures in History. Reaktion Books. ISBN 978-1-86189-969-9.
- Gramsci, Antonio (2011). Prison Notebooks. Columbia University Press. ISBN 978-0-231-06083-7.
- Grau, Andree; Jordan, Stephanie (2002-06-01). Europe Dancing: Perspectives on Theatre, Dance, and Cultural Identity. Routledge. ISBN 978-1-134-69653-6.
- Jirat-Wasiutyński, Vojtěch (2007). Modern Art and the Idea of the Mediterranean. University of Toronto Press. ISBN 978-0-8020-9170-3.
- Kezich, Tullio (2007). Federico Fellini: His Life and Work. I.B.Tauris. ISBN 978-1-84511-425-1.
- Kirk, Terry (2005-06-02). The Architecture of Modern Italy: Visions of Utopia, 1900-Present -. Princeton Architectural Press. ISBN 978-1-56898-436-0.
- Mann, Vivian B. (1989). Gardens and Ghettos: The Art of Jewish Life in Italy. University of California Press. ISBN 978-0-520-06825-4.
- Ponzetti, Francesca (2011). "Il caso Gualino" (PDF). Teatro e Storia (in Italian).
- "Riccardo Gualino (Biella, 1879 - Firenze, 1964)". Museo Torino.
- "Riccardo Gualino". Storia e Cultura dell'Industria.
- Small, Pauline (2009). Sophia Loren: Moulding the Star. Intellect Books. ISBN 978-1-84150-234-2.
- Spicer, Andrew; McKenna, Anthony; Meir, Christopher (2014-07-31). Beyond the Bottom Line: The Producer in Film and Television Studies. Bloomsbury Publishing. ISBN 978-1-4411-2512-5.
- Waine, Anthony Edward; Passerini, Luisa (2007). Women and Men in Love: European Identities in the Twentieth Century. Berghahn Books. ISBN 978-1-84545-522-4.
- Zamagni, Vera (1993-10-28). The Economic History of Italy 1860-1990. Clarendon Press. ISBN 978-0-19-159022-1.
