= Accademia Albertina =

Art school in Turin, Italy

Coordinates: 45°4′3″N 7°41′22″E

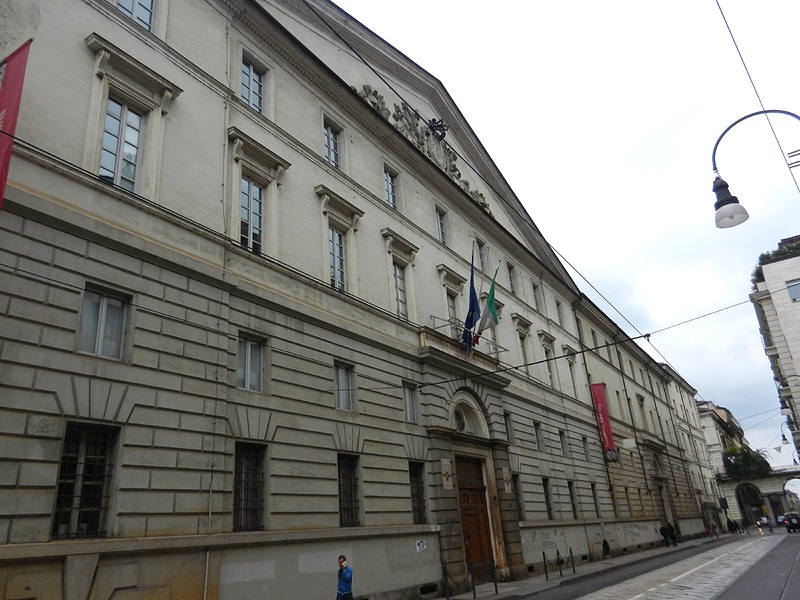
- Former names: Università dei Pittori, Scultori e Architetti; Reale Accademia di pittura e scultura
- Established: 1678
- President: Paola Gribaudo
- Rector: Edoardo Di Mauro
- Students: 1,600
- Location: Turin, Italy
- Location in Turin

The Accademia Albertina di Belle Arti ("Albertina Academy of Fine Arts") is an institution of higher education in Turin, Italy

== History ==
In the first half of the seventeenth century, there was a "University of Painters, Sculptors and Architects" in Turin which in 1652 became the Compagnia di San Luca. In 1678 it was formally refounded as the Academy of Painters, Sculptors and Architects (Accademia dei Pittori, Scultori e Architetti) by Marie Jeanne of Savoy, inspired by the Académie Royale de Paris. The establishment of the Royal Academy of painting and sculpture in 1778, a century after its first foundation, was among the first events that inaugurated the period of reforms of the reign of Victor Amadeus III under a policy of promotion of culture. It was re-established under the name Albertina in 1833 by Charles Albert of Sardinia, who had architect Giuseppe Talucchi design and realize a new building on the former site of the convent of the Church of San Francesco da Paola. Many paintings were donated by the Marquis Monsignor Mossi di Morano, including a precious altarpiece by Filippo Lippi. Very quickly the art gallery was enriched to become a significant museum heritage, an important plaster cast gallery and a vast library, which collects together with precious volumes, prints, drawings and photographs of inestimable value. The academy witnessed the transition of artistic movements during the late 19th to early 20th century, from realism to eclecticism and the Liberty style, in the works of painters Antonio Fontanesi and Giacomo Grosso, and sculptors Vincenzo Vela and Odoardo Tabacchi. Turin became a leading centre of visual arts during the mid-20th century. A new artistic turning point, with artists of great reputation, took place in the 1940s, thanks to the work of painters such as Felice Casorati, Enrico Paulucci, Francesco Menzio and sculptors such as Sandro Cherchi, engravers such as Mario Calandri.

== Art gallery ==
The academy is home to a gallery (the Pinacoteca), which was founded to serve in the training of the academy's students. Its collection includes that donated by Mossi di Morano, the Archbishop of Casale Monferrato, in 1828, and 16th-century cartoons by Gaudenzio Ferrari and his school, which were donated by Charles Albert in 1832.

The Mossi di Morano collection includes 16th–17th-century Flemish and Dutch works, 17th–18th-century Venetian paintings, and important 16th–17th-century Piemontese works including those of Defendente Ferrari and Giovanni Martino Spanzotti, among others. Notable works include Saint Ambrose and Saint Gregory, Doctors of the Church by Filippo Lippi, Ferrari's The Lamentation of Christ, Deposition in the Sepulchre by Maarten van Heemskerck, After the Battle by Cornelis de Wael, Portrait of a Gentleman, Three-Quarters View by Nicolas Lagneau, Hercules and the Nemean Lion by Ignazio Collino, and Giuseppe Pietro Bagetti's Mountainous Landscape with Coastal Inlets. The Pinacoteca has been open to the public since 1996.

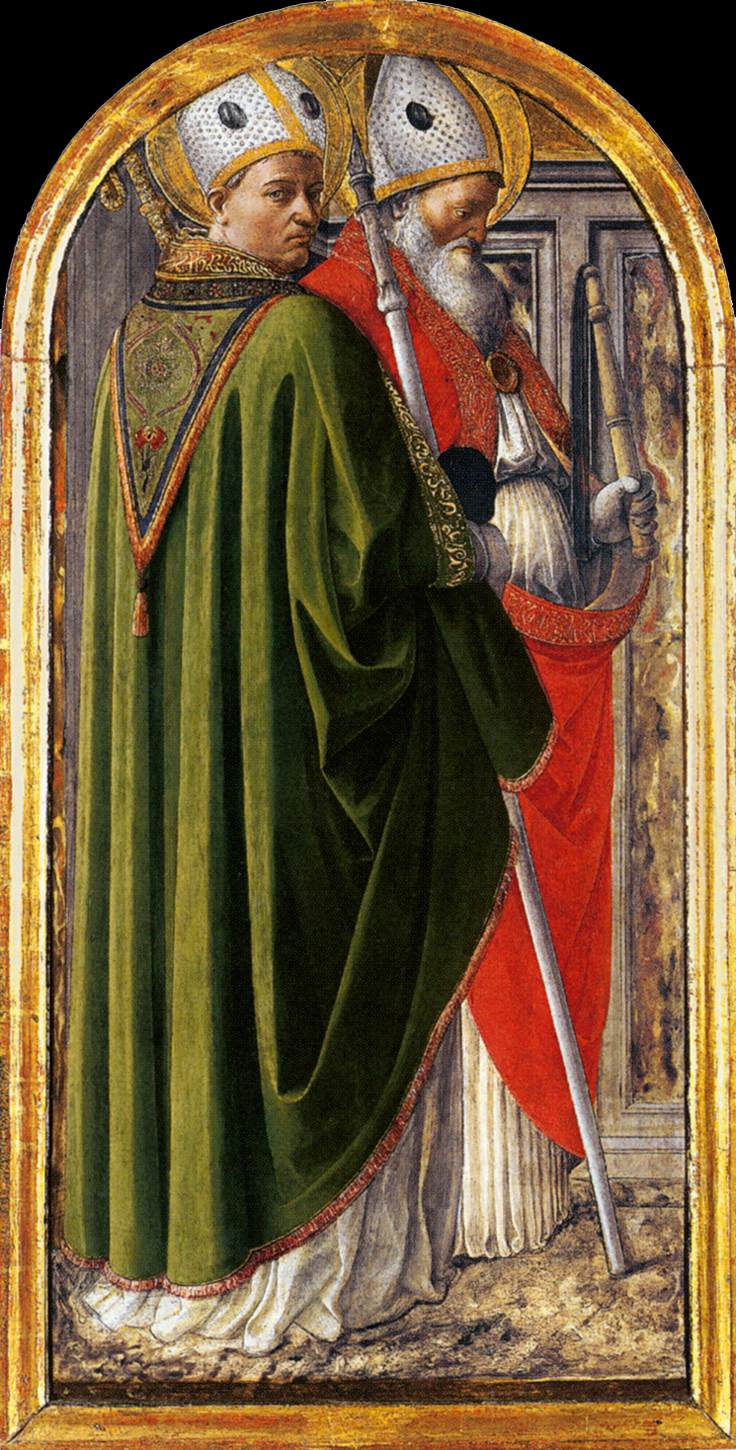
Saints Augustine and Ambrose by Filippo Lippi, part of academy's collection
