= Lionello Venturi =

Italian historian and critic of art (1885–1961)

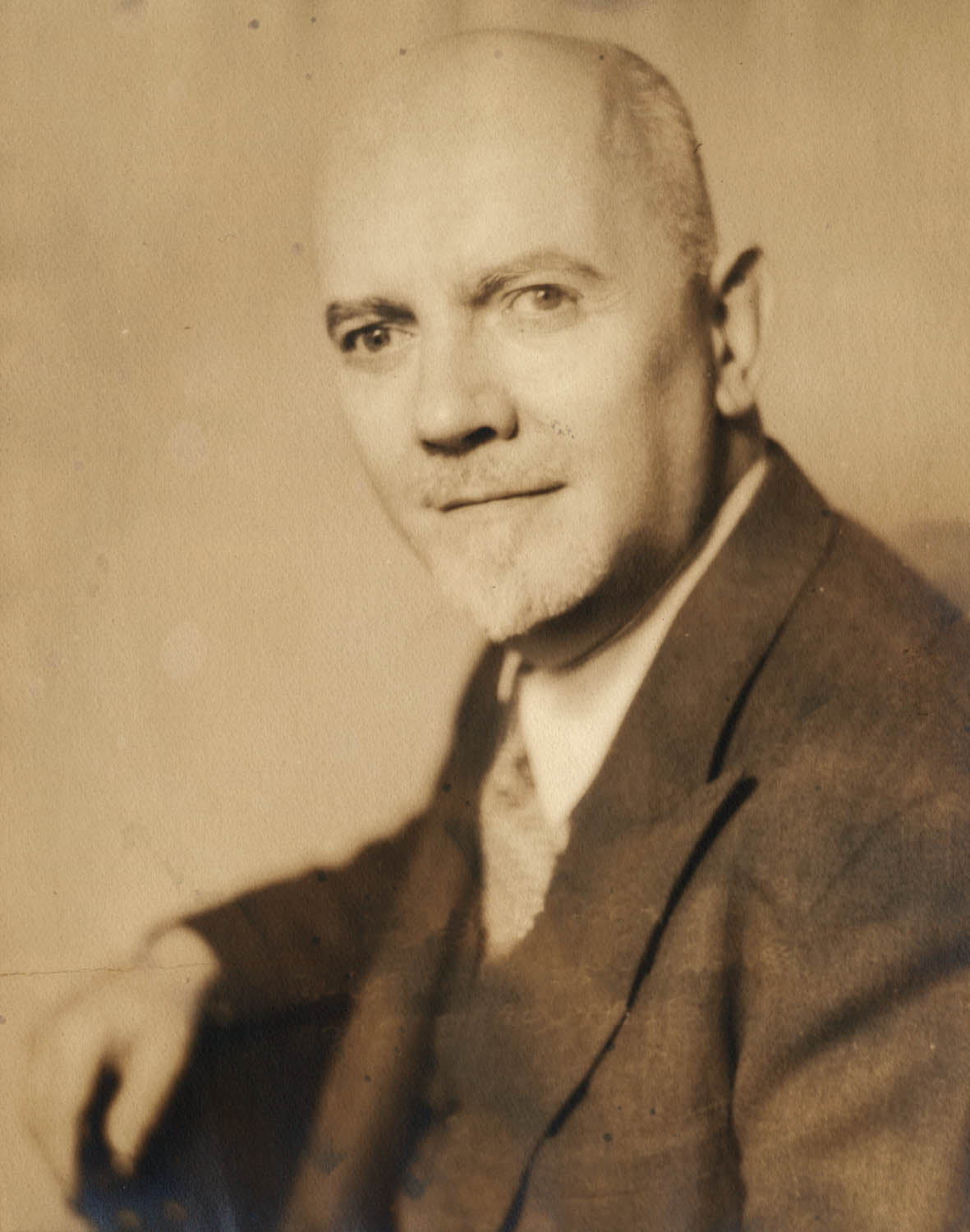
Lionello Venturi

Lionello Venturi (25 April 1885 – 14 August 1961) was an Italian historian and critic of art. He edited the first catalogue raisonné of Paul Cézanne. His son was the historian Franco Venturi.

== Life ==
Lionello Venturi was born in Modena in 1885, son of art historian Adolfo Venturi. He became a specialist in the art of the Italian Renaissance, but was also interested in late 19th and early 20th century art. In 1918, he met the financier and collector Riccardo Gualino, and advised him to buy work by Amedeo Modigliani. Gualino and Venturi supported Turin painters such as Felice Casorati and the Gruppo di Sei (Group of Six), which included Carlo Levi, Francesco Menzio, Jessie Boswell, Gigi Chessa, Enrico Paolucci and Nicola Galante. Venturi was appointed professor of art history at the University of Turin in 1919. One of his first students there was Mary Pittaluga, who wrote her thesis on Fromentin under Venturi. In 1930, Venturi organized a retrospective exhibition of Modigliani's work in Venice based on the paintings owned by Gualino.

Though appointed his father's successor as the art history chair at the University of Rome in 1931, Venturi refused to swear allegiance to Benito Mussolini's regime in August 1931 and so was forced to resign from the university. He left Italy, initially moving to Paris, where he wrote, advised art dealers and museum curators, and produced the first catalogue raisonné of Paul Cézanne. After the establishment of the Vichy regime, he emigrated to the United States, living in New York City until 1945 and lecturing at a range of American universities.

While in America, Venturi joined the antifascist Mazzini Society. After the war, he returned to Italy, taking up his chair in art history at Rome. Venturi was influenced by the idealism of Benedetto Croce as well as the writing of Alois Riegl and Heinrich Wölfflin.

== Works ==
- Il gusto dei primitivi [The Taste of the Primitives], 1926
- Cézanne, son art, son oeuvre, Paris: P. Rosenberg, 1936
- History of art criticism, New York: E.P. Dutton, 1936.
- Camille Pissarro: son art, son oeuvre. Paris: P. Rosenberg, 1939.
- Les archives de l'Impressionisme, Paris and New York: Durand-Ruel, 1939
- Art Criticism Now, Baltimore: Johns Hopkins University Press, 1941
- Painting and painters; how to look at a picture, from Giotto to Chagall, 1945
- Marc Chagall, (1500 limited edition), Pierre Matisse Editions, New York, 1945
- Italian painting, 3 vols, 1950–52
- Piero della Francesca: biographical and critical studies, 1954
- The sixteenth century, from Leonardo to El Greco, 1956
- Chagall: biographical and critical study, 1956
- Four steps toward modern art: Giorgione, Caravaggio, Manet, Cézanne, 1956
- Rouault: biographical and critical study, 1959
