= Carlo Chessa =

Italian painter

Carlo Chessa (1855 – August 24, 1912) was an Italian painter, printmaker, and illustrator. He is the father of Gigi Chessa.

He was born in Cagliari, Sardinia. He mainly painted Alpine landscapes, and exhibited in Turin at the Promotrice of 1884,1888–1897, and in 1911. He also exhibited with the biennial exhibitions of the Circle of Artists around those years. He was known for his etchings of portraits and vedute. His engravings were featured in the following books:

- Leggende del mare (1894) by Maria Savi-Lopez, E. Loescher, with 60 illustrations by Carlo Chessa.
- Leggende delle Alpi (1889) by Maria Savi-Lopez with 60 illustrations by Carlo Chessa (see full version, Alpensagen (1893) in German).
- Chronique du temps qui fut la Jacquerie by Leon Hennique, Carlo Chessa, ... Cossard, Luc Olivier Merson Librairie de la Collection des Dix, Romagnol, 1903.
