= Carlo Levi =

Italian painter, writer and activist (1902–1975)

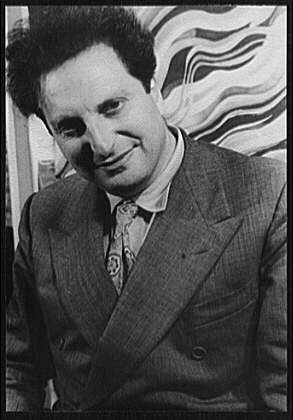
- Carlo Levi in 1947 (portrait by Carl Van Vechten)
- Born: 29 November 1902; Turin, Italy
- Died: 4 January 1975 (aged 72); Rome, Italy
- Education: Self taught, University of Turin (MD)
- Known for: Painting, Literature, Medicine
- Notable work: Cristo si è fermato ad Eboli (Christ Stopped at Eboli) (1945)
- Movement: Contemporary
- Awards: Senator of the Italian Republic
- Patrons: Felice Casorati

Carlo Levi (Italian pronunciation: [ˈkarlo ˈlɛːvi]) (29 November 1902 – 4 January 1975) was an Italian painter, writer, activist, independent leftist politician, and medical doctor.

He is best known for his book Cristo si è fermato a Eboli (Christ Stopped at Eboli), published in 1945, a memoir of his time spent in exile in Lucania, Italy, after being arrested in connection with his political activism. In 1979, the book became the basis of a movie of the same name, directed by Francesco Rosi. Lucania, also called Basilicata, was historically one of the poorest regions of the impoverished Italian south. Levi's lucid, non-ideological and sympathetic description of the daily hardships experienced by the local peasants helped to propel the "Problem of the South" into national discourse after the end of World War II.

== Early life ==
Levi was born in Turin, Piedmont, to wealthy Jewish physician Ercole Levi and Annetta Treves, the sister of Claudio Treves, a socialist leader in Italy. He graduated from high school (Liceo Alfieri) in 1917, and then attended the University of Turin, where he studied medicine and graduated in 1924 with high marks. While at university, Levi had become friends with Piero Gobetti who sparked his interest in political activism that would continue throughout his life. Soon after graduation from the University of Turin, Levi exhibited some of his works at the XIV Venice Biennale.

Levi never completely abandoned his medical studies and served as assistant to Professor Micheli at the University of Turin's Clinic from 1924 to 1928, working on research involving hepatopathy and diseases of bile tract. During the same period, Levi continued his specialization studies in Paris with Professor Bourguignon among others, although by 1927 he had decided to dedicate his life to painting. Levi's early time in Paris, as a painter and as a student of medicine, brought him into contact with many notable personalities of the 20th century, including Sergei Prokofiev, Igor Stravinsky, Alberto Moravia, Giorgio de Chirico, and others. He lived almost exclusively in Paris from 1932 to 1934 and, while there, attended the funeral in 1933 of his uncle (his mother's brother), Claudio Treves.

== Political activism and exile ==
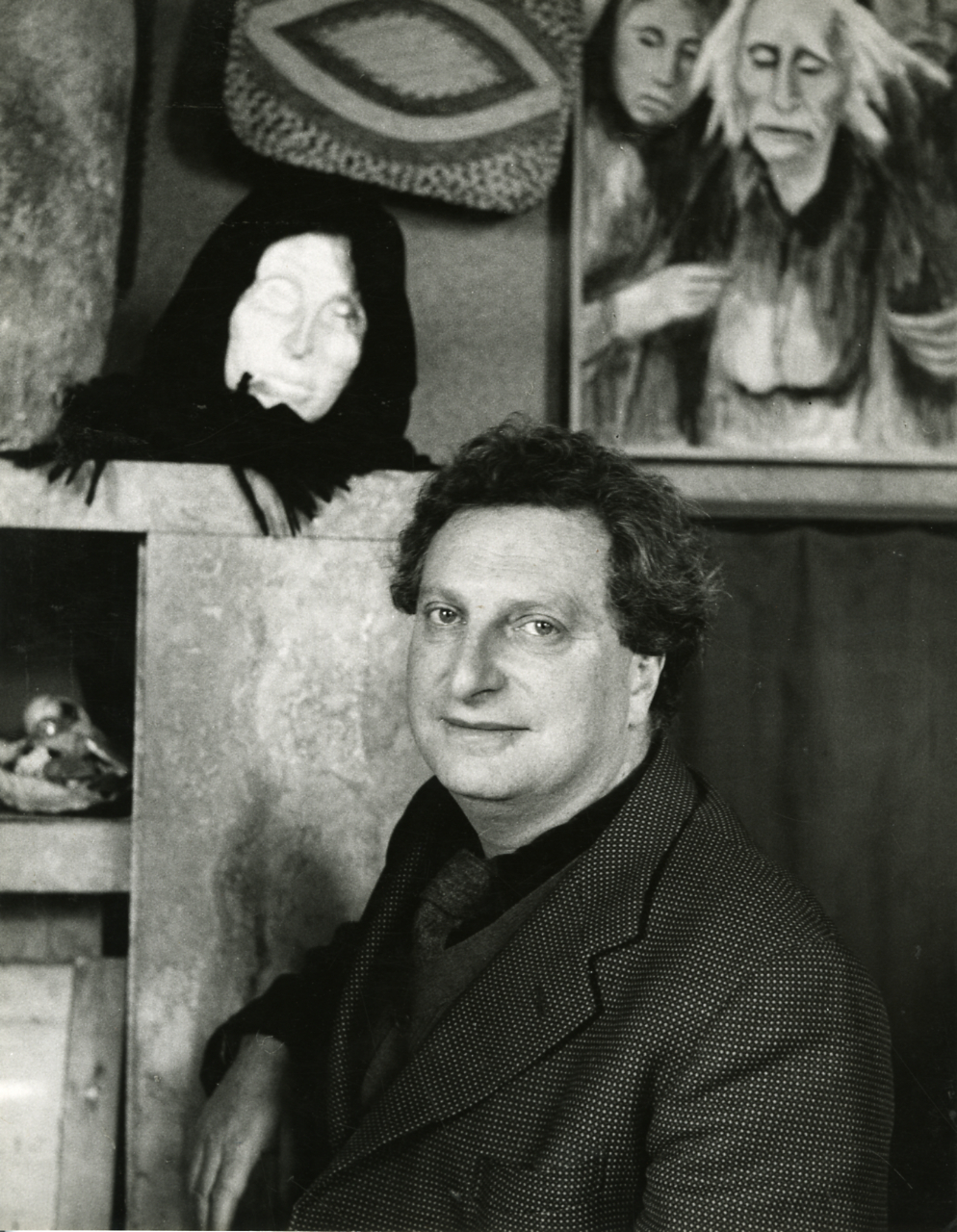
Carlo Levi in 1955. Photo by Paolo Monti (Fondo Paolo Monti, BEIC).

In 1929, along with Carlo and Nello Rosselli he founded an anti-fascist movement called Giustizia e Libertà, becoming a leader of the Italian branch along with Leone Ginzburg, a Russian Jew from Odessa who had emigrated with his parents to Italy. He also joined with Francesco Menzio in the "Gruppo dei Sei" ("Group of six"), all painters in Turin, including Jessie Boswell, Gigi Chessa, Nicola Galante and Enrico Paulucci.

As a result of his activism and involvement with anti-fascist movements, Levi was arrested and exiled to Aliano (Gagliano in Cristo si è fermato a Eboli) and Grassano, two towns in a remote area of Italy called Lucania (now Basilicata) from 1935 to 1936. There he encountered a poverty almost unknown in prosperous northern Italy. While there, Levi worked on the side as one of the doctors for the villagers, although he had never practised medicine after graduating from medical school. During his exile he spent much of his time painting.

After his release, he moved to France and lived there from 1939 to 1941. In 1941, he returned to Italy, and was later arrested again in Florence and imprisoned in the Murate prison. He was released following Benito Mussolini's arrest and sought refuge across the street from the Pitti Palace, where he wrote Cristo si è fermato a Eboli. The square there has been named after him.

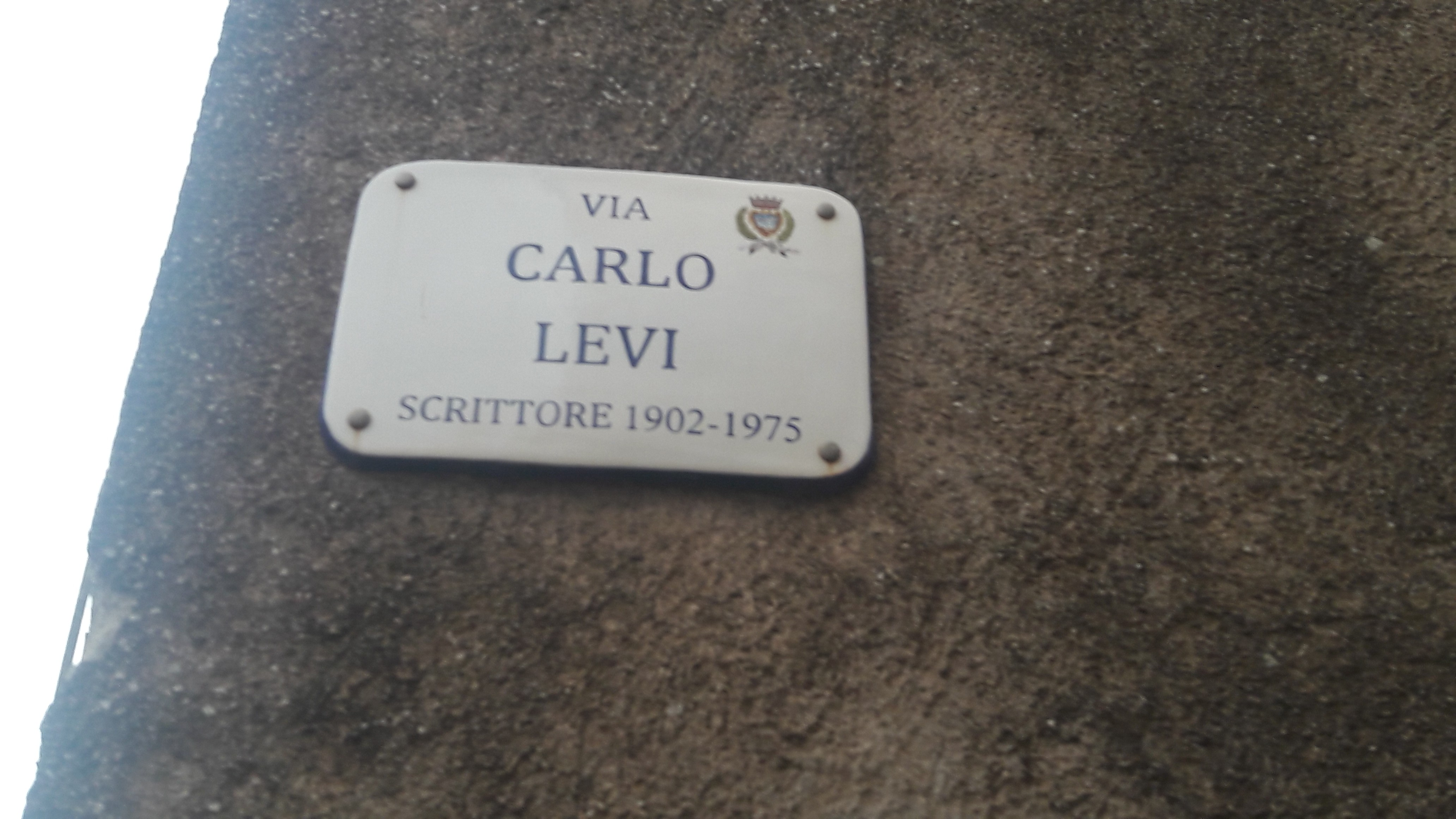
street name sign in Erice, Sicily

After World War II, he moved to Rome and from 1945 to 1946 he served as the editor of L'Italia Libera, the publication of the Partito d'Azione, an anti-fascist organization that grew out of the republican tradition. He continued to write and paint, exhibiting in Europe and the United States. His written works include L'Orologio (The Watch) (1950), Le parole sono pietre (Words Are Stones) (1955), and Il Futuro ha un Cuore Antico (The Future has an Ancient Heart) (1956). In 1963, he was elected to the Senate as an independent on the Communist Party ticket; he was re-elected to the Senate in 1968 and served there until 1972. He died of pneumonia in Rome on 4 January 1975. He is buried in Aliano. The 'Persiana' Gallery in Palermo exhibited his last work, Apollo and Daphne, executed on a goatskin drum the day before he was admitted to hospital.

== Works ==
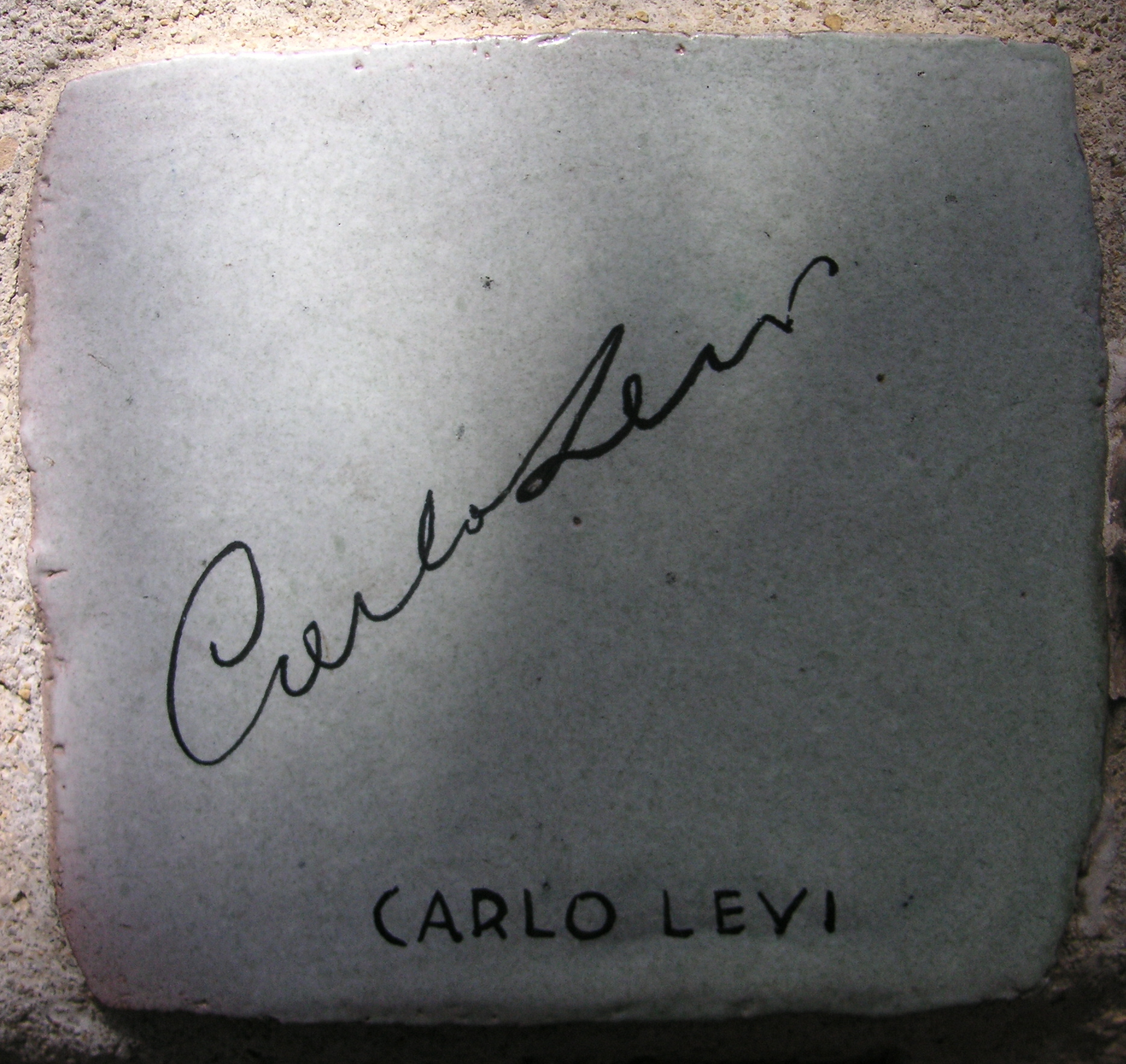
Tile autographed by Carlo Levi at Alassio

Below is a list of Carlo Levi's main works. Publisher (where appropriate) and date of publication follow each work:

- Paura della pittura (1942)
- Cristo si è fermato a Eboli (Einaudi, 1945)
- Paura della libertà (1946)
- L'orologio (Einaudi, 1950)
- Le parole sono pietre (Einaudi, 1955)
- II futuro ha un cuore antico (Einaudi, 1956; won the Premio Viareggio)
- La doppia notte dei tigli (Einaudi, 1959)
- Un volto che ci somiglia (Ritratto dell'Italia) (Einaudi, 1960)
- Tutto il miele è finito (Einaudi, 1964)
- Quaderno a cancelli (Einaudi, 1979; published posthumously)
- Coraggio dei miti (Scrìtti contemporanei 1922–1974) (De Donato, 1975; published posthumously)
- Carlo Levi inedito: con 40 disegni della cecità, Donato Sperduto (ed.), Edizioni Spes, Milazzo, 2002.

Levi also wrote numerous prefaces and introductions for many authors throughout his lifetime. There have also been collections of Levi's works published after his death, notably essays, miscellaneous writings, and poetry.

== Essays ==
- Levi, Carlo, Roma fuggitiva: una città e i suoi dintorni. Saggi. Roma: Donzelli, 2002. (ISBN 978-8879896955)
- Levi, Carlo, Fleeting Rome: In Search of the Dolce Vita. Essays. John Wiley & Sons, 2004. (ISBN 978-0-470-87183-6)
- Levi, Carlo, Stanislao G. Pugliese, and Carlo Levi. Fear of Freedom: With the Essay, "Fear of Painting". New York: Columbia University Press, 2008. (ISBN 0-231-13996-9)
- Carlo Levi inedito: con 40 disegni della cecità, Donato Sperduto (ed.), Edizioni Spes, Milazzo, 2002.
- Sperduto, Donato, Armonie lontane, Aracne, Roma, 2013.
- Ward, David, Carlo Levi, La Nuova Italia, Milano, 2002.
- Arouimi, Michel, Magies de Levi, Schena-Lanore, Fasano-Parigi, 2006.
- Dalia Abdullah, "Pittura e letteratura: Il bilinguismo di Carlo Levi", in "Riscontri. Rivista trimestrale di cultura e di attualità", XXXIV (2012), 3-4, pp. 9–54.
- Donato Sperduto, Oltre il tempo e oltre la cuccagna, Bari, Edizioni Wip, 2023.

== Gallery ==
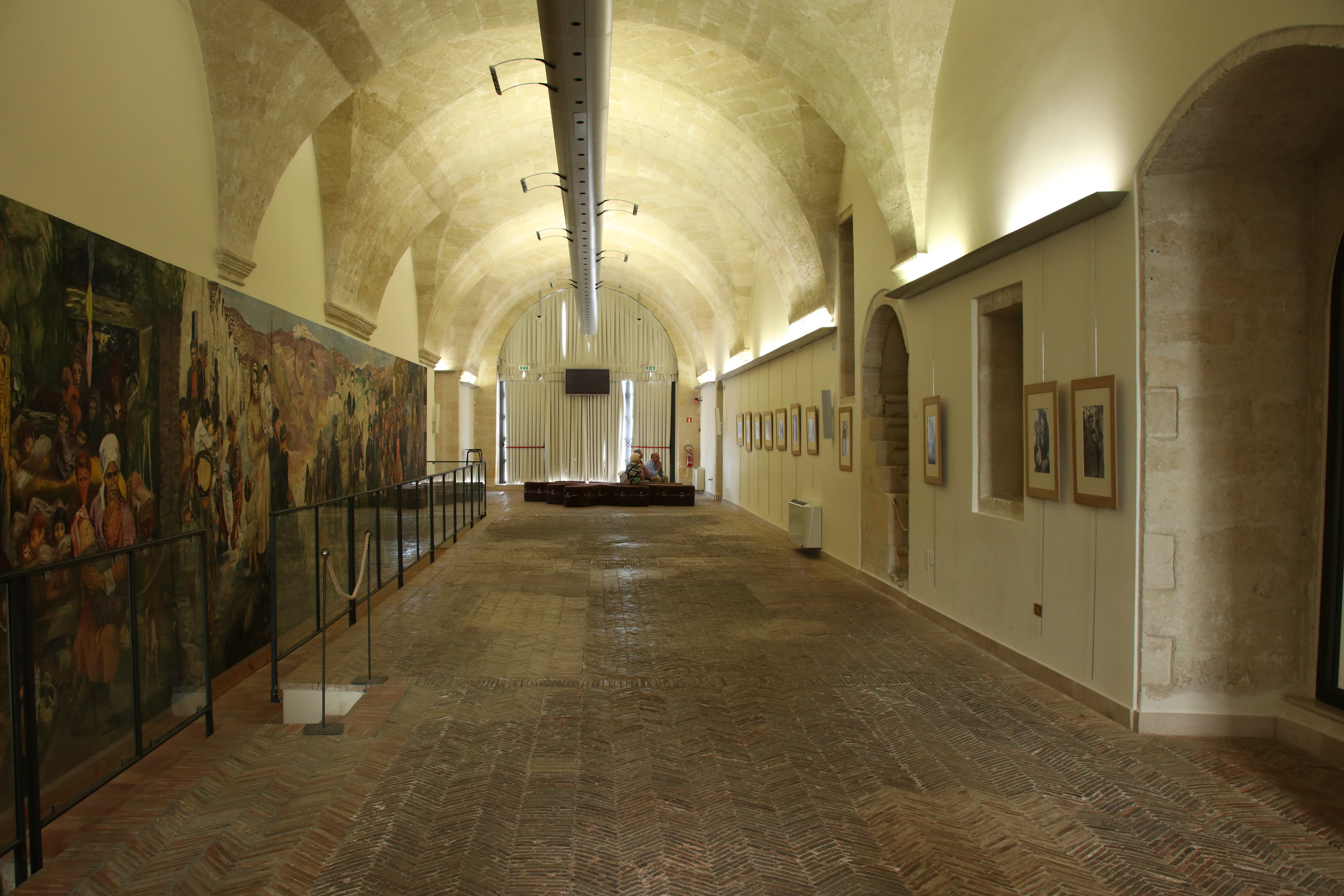
Levi's monumental painting Lucania 61 (1961), in Palazzo Lanfranchi (it), Matera

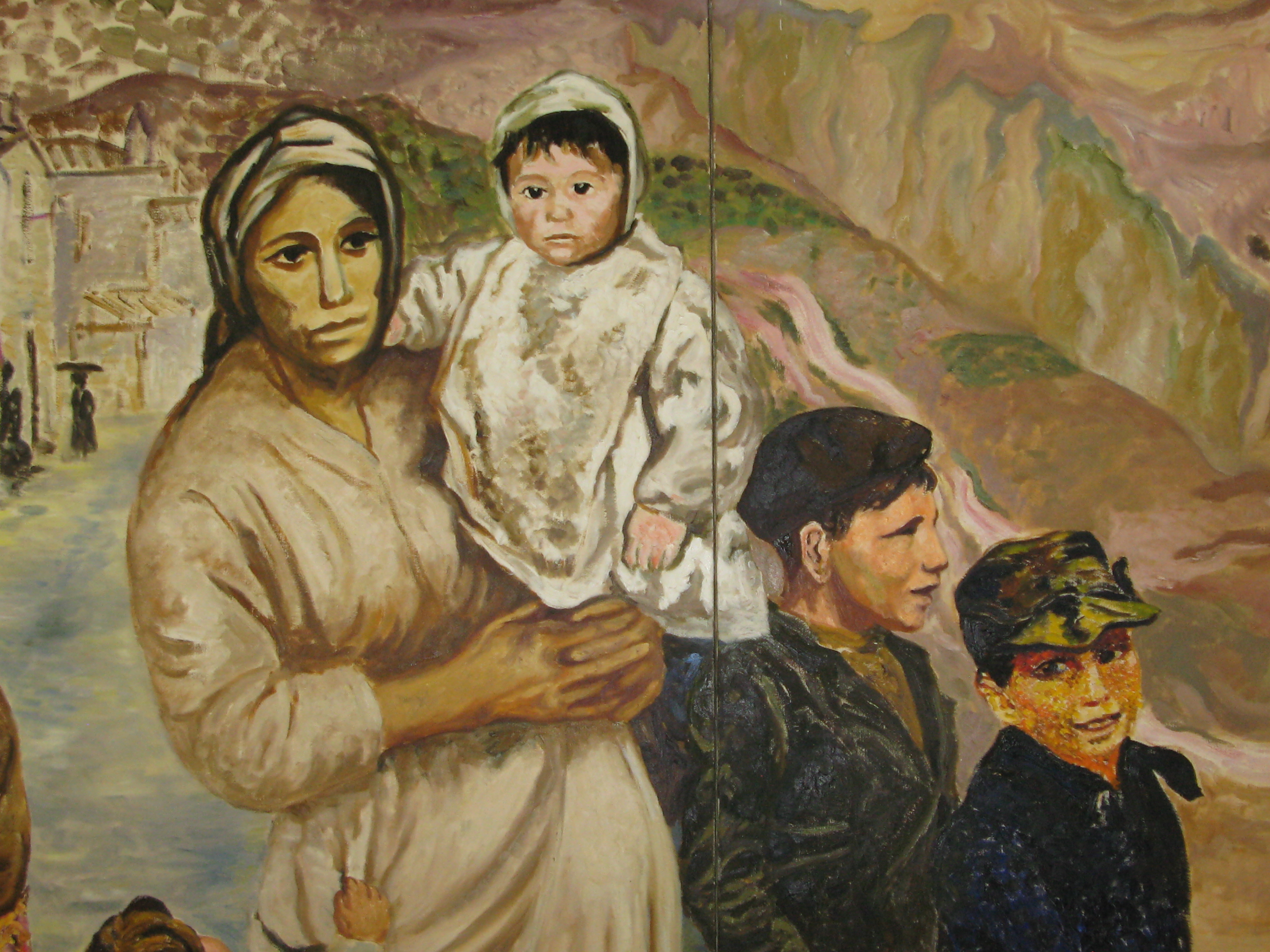
Lucania 61, detail

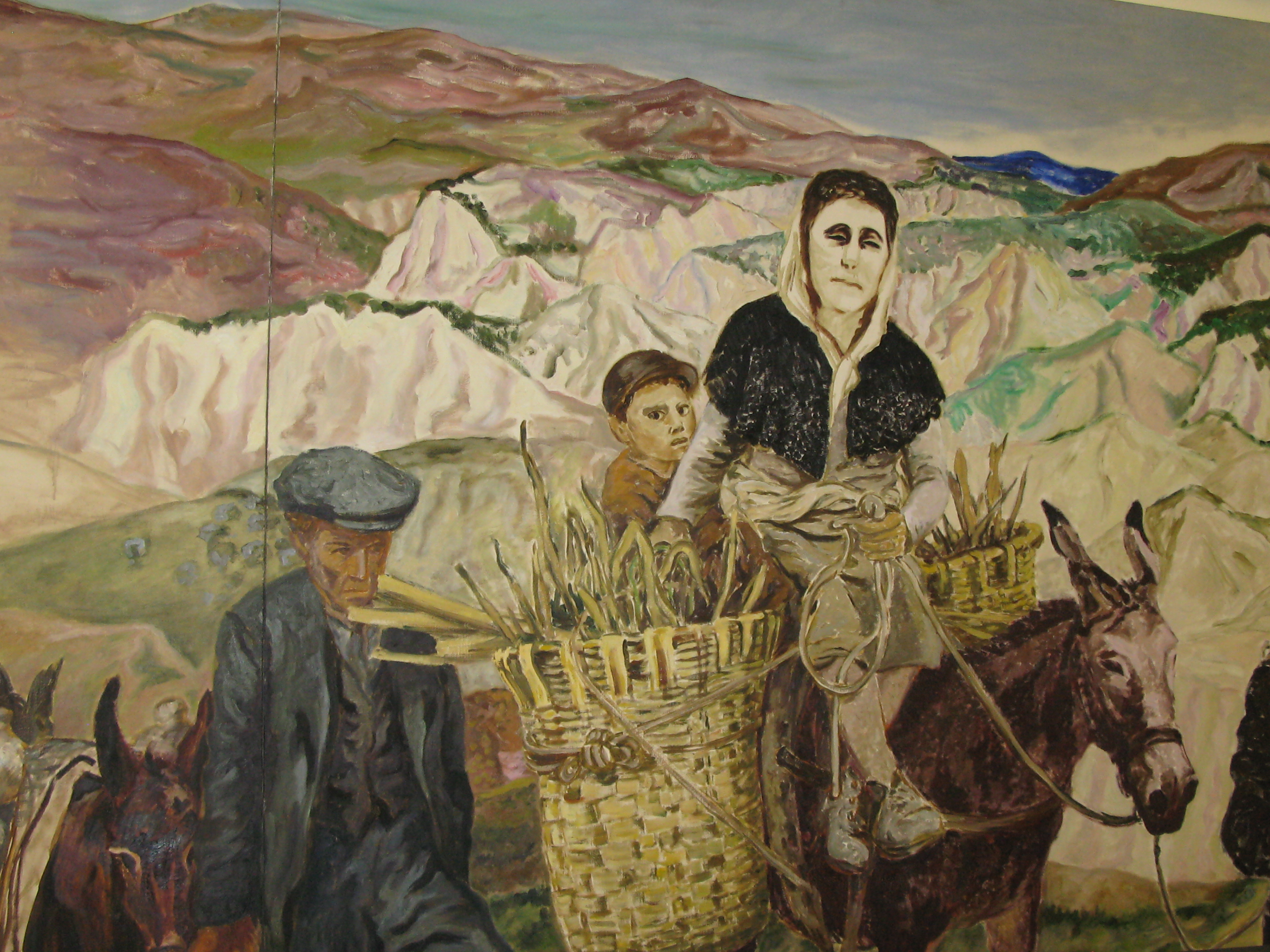
Lucania 61, detail

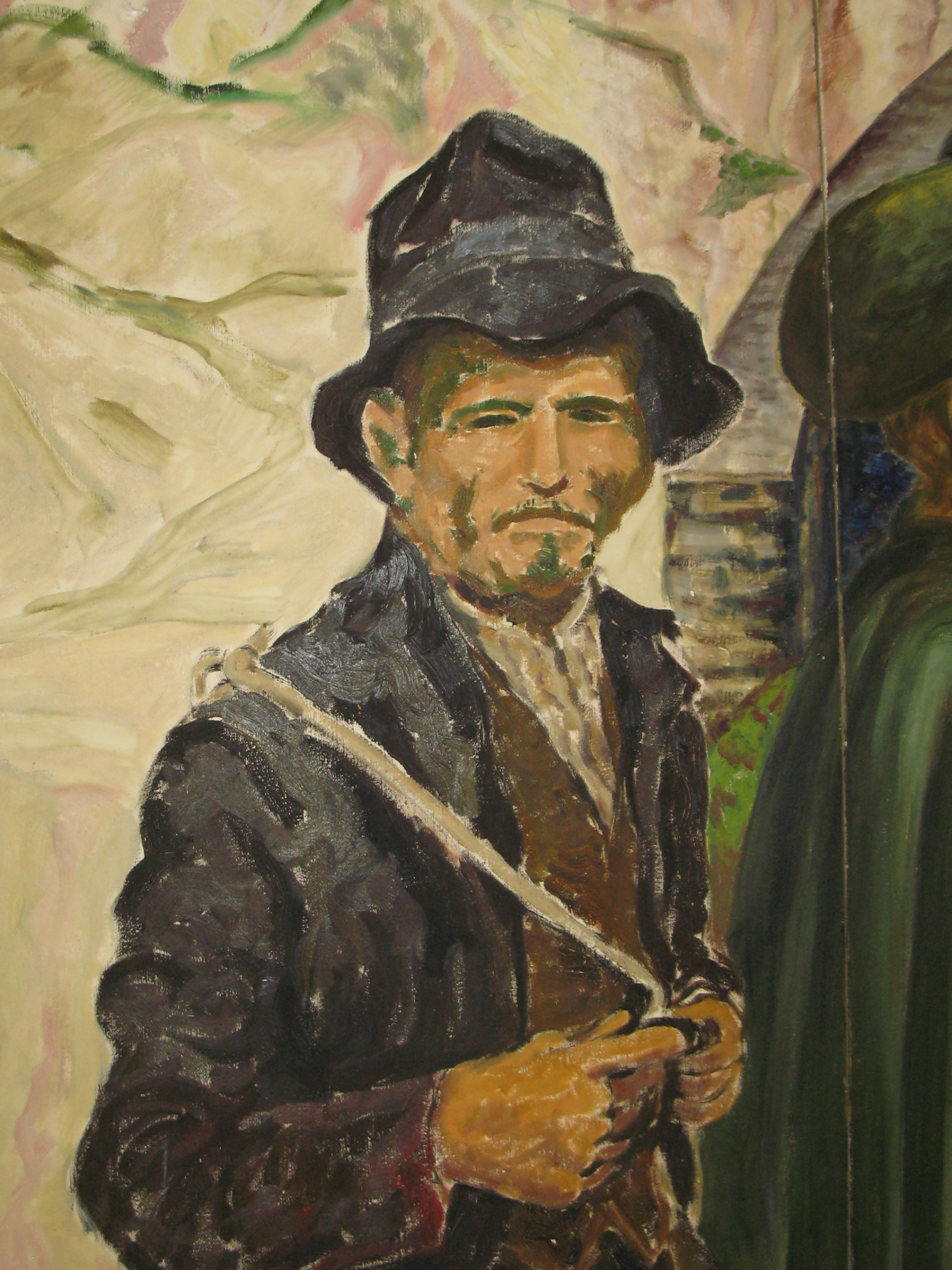
Lucania 61, detail

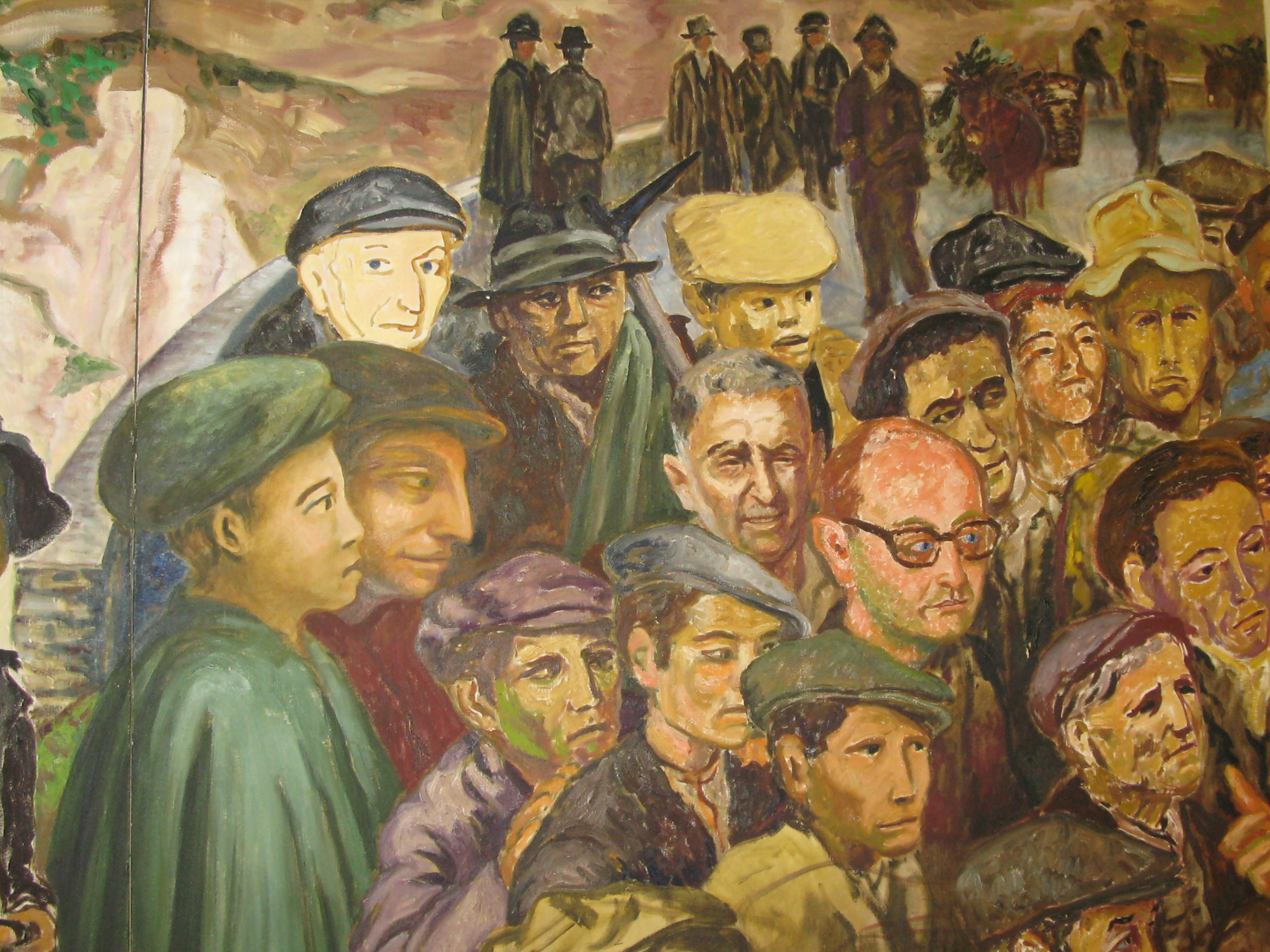
Lucania 61, detail
