= Felice Casorati =

Italian painter

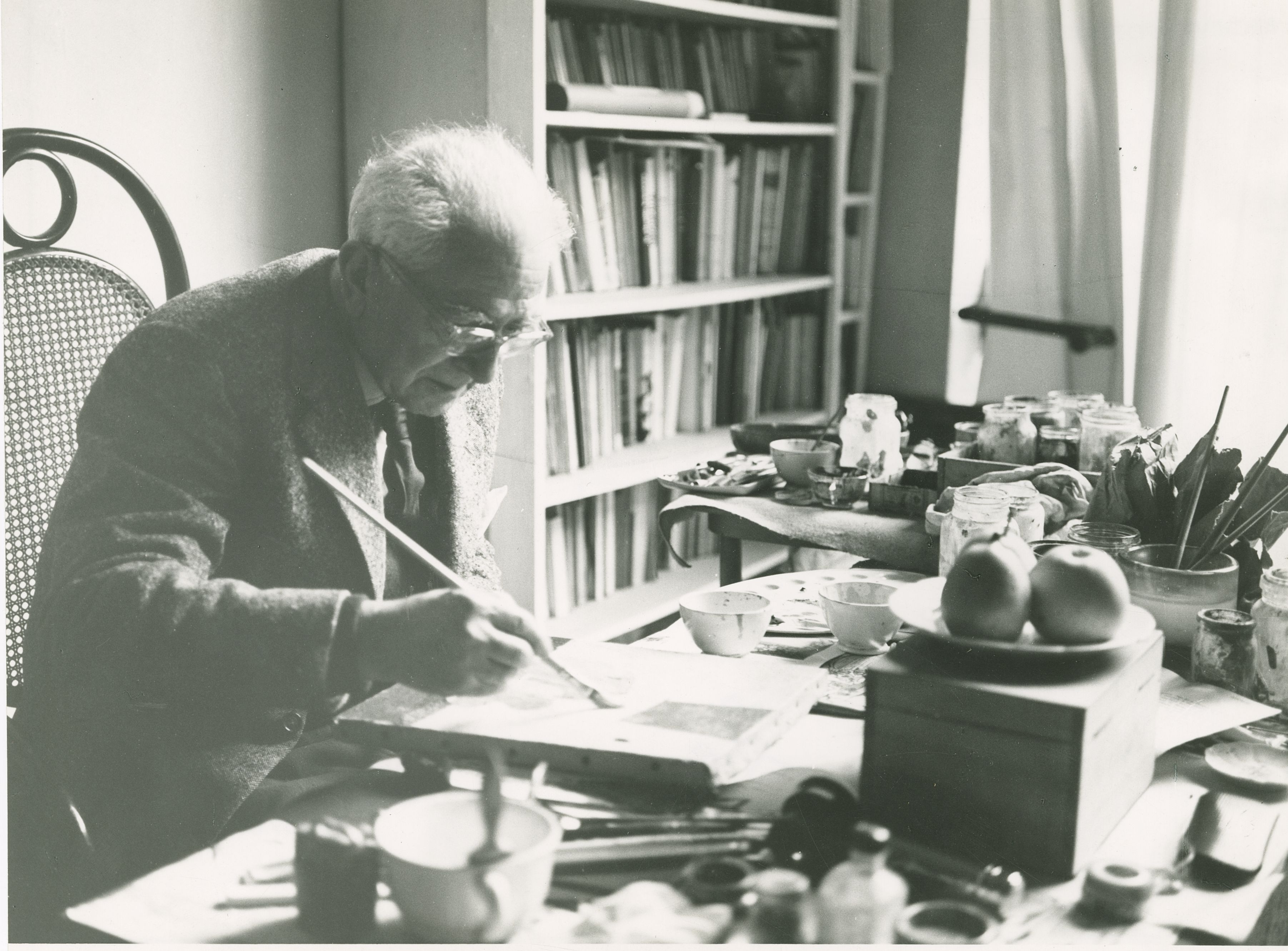
- Photo Portrait of the Italian painter Felice Casorati in his studio at Via Mazzini 52 in Turin 1963
- Born: 4 December 1883; Novara
- Died: 1 March 1963 (aged 79); Turin
- Occupation: Painter, graphic artist, sculptor, illustrator, drawer, artist

Silvana Cenni by Felice Casorati, 1922, tempera on canvas, 205 x 105 cm

Felice Casorati (4 December 1883 – 1 March 1963) was an Italian painter, sculptor, and printmaker. The paintings for which he is most noted include figure compositions, portraits and still lifes, which are often distinguished by unusual perspective effects.

== Life and work ==
Casorati was born in Novara. He showed an early passion for music, but abandoned his study of piano after a serious illness and became interested in art. To please his mother he studied law at the University of Padua until 1906, but his ambition to be a painter was confirmed in 1907 when a painting of his was shown in the Venice Biennale. The works he produced in the early years of his career were naturalistic in style, but after 1910 the influence of the symbolists and particularly of Gustav Klimt turned him toward a more visionary approach. In 1915 he had a solo exhibition at the Rome Secession III, where he showed several paintings and the first of his sculptures in varnished terracotta. His military service in World War I began that year and lasted until his discharge from the army after the death of his father in 1917.

In 1918, "intrigued by the decadent atmosphere of Turin with its sinister views", he settled there with his mother and two sisters. His works of the next decade typify, in their emphasis on geometry and formal clarity, the "return to order" then prevalent in the arts as a reaction to the war. Although many critics found his work cold, cerebral, and academic, Casorati achieved international recognition as a leading figure in this movement. Often working in tempera, Casorati drew inspiration from his study of Renaissance masters, especially Piero della Francesca, as in his 1922 portrait titled Silvana Cenni. This symmetrical composition of a seated woman in a white dress is perhaps the best-known of the artist's works. In it, the careful rendering of volumes results paradoxically in a sense of unreality which is characteristic of Casorati's art.

In 1925, Raffaello Giolli summarized the disconcerting aspects of Casorati's art—"The volumes have no weight in them, and the colors no body. Everything is fictitious: even the living lack all nervous vitality. The sun seems to be the moon ... nothing is fixed or definite"—and argued that these very qualities give his work its originality, and connect him to the metaphysical painters. Casorati himself wrote, in 1931: "In taking up, against me, the old polemic of classicism and romanticism, people rail against intellectualized and scholastic order, accuse my art of being insincere, and wilfully academic—in a word, of being neoclassical. ... since my art is born, so to speak, from within, and never has its source in changing "impressions", it is quite natural that ... static forms, and not the fluid images of passion, should be reflected in my works".

Briefly arrested in 1923 for his involvement with an anti-Fascist group, Casorati subsequently avoided antagonizing the regime. Beginning in 1923, he opened his studio to the young art students of Turin, and to emerging Italian artists such as Quinto Martini and painters of the Gruppo dei Sei (Group of Six). In 1925, one of his students was Daphne Mabel Maugham, later his wife.

After 1930 the severity of Casorati's earlier style softened somewhat and his palette brightened. He continued to exhibit widely, winning many awards, including the First Prize at the Venice Biennale of 1938. His work Carità di San Martino (1939) is in Museo cantonale d'arte of Lugano. He was also involved in stage design. One of his later students was the Italian painter Enrico Accatino. Casorati died in Turin in 1963.

Most of Casorati's important works are in Italian collections, public and private, including the Modern Art Revoltella Museum in Trieste and Galleria Nazionale d'Arte Moderna. Other museums that hold his work include the Museum of Fine Arts, Boston, the Detroit Institute of Arts, the Metropolitan Museum of Art, the Birmingham Museum of Art, the British Museum, MSK Ghent Belgium, and the University of Michigan Museum of Art.
