= Paolo Battino Vittorelli =

Egyptian–Italian author, journalist, and politician (1915-2003)

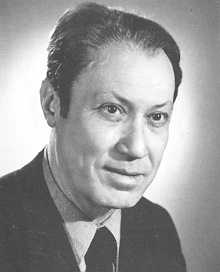
- Paolo Battino Vittorelli
- Born: Raffaello Battino; 9 July 1915; Alexandria, Sultanate of Egypt
- Died: 24 March 2003; Turin, Piedmont, Italy
- Occupations: author, journalist, and politician
- Political party: GL (1930s); PdA (1944–1947); UdS (1948–1949); PSU (1949–1951); PSDI (1951–1953); UP (1953–1957); PSI (1957–1994); DS (1998–2003)
- Parents: Amedeo Clemente Battino (father); Blanche Caroli (mother)

Paolo Battino Vittorelli (9 July 1915 – 24 March 2003) was an Italian author, journalist, political commentator, and politician of the centre-left. He actively engaged in anti-fascist propaganda during the war years, most of which he spent exiled in Egypt as an anti-fascist publicist and professor at Cairo University.

== Biography ==
=== Family provenance and early years ===
Paolo Battino Vittorelli was born as "Raffaello Battino" to an Italian–Jewish family in Alexandria, Sultanate of Egypt, at the time a protectorate of the British Empire. His ancestral roots tracked back to Corfu, which had been ruled by the Republic of Venice for half a millennium until the end of the 18th century, and which remained heavily influenced by Venetian and Italian culture through the 19th and early 20th centuries. Amedeo Battino, his father, had graduated from the University of Athens and then as a newly qualified lawyer moved to the Khedivate of Egypt in 1908, an autonomous tributary state of the Ottoman Empire, attracted by the commercial opportunities and the booming free-wheeling economy which had opened up to European businesses since the opening of the Suez Canal in 1864.

His mother, born Blanche Caroli, ended up in Alexandria after Giacomo Caroli, her own father (and thereby Raffaello's maternal grandfather) had moved to Egypt following the death of his wife (born Emilia Mattatia, Raffaello's maternal grandmother), and set himself up in business as the owner-manager of a small hotel in Alexandria. Giacomo Caroli was born in Trieste but moved to Corfu when he married, as his second wife, Emilia Mattatia, who had grown up on the island. The child grew up bilingual, fluent both in Italian and French; the latter was the language still favoured by the largely expatriate Western European community of bourgeois businessmen and bureaucrats in British-ruled Egypt.

=== "Giustizia e Libertà" in France ===
He moved to Paris, France in order to complete his law studies in 1936. He came into contact with the Rosselli brothers and joined up with their exiled anti-fascist Justice and Freedom (Giustizia e Libertà; GL) movement. Aldo Garòsci, a leading group member and anti-fascist militant who had been in Paris since 1932, suggested that he should use the secret pseudonym "Paolo Vittorelli". Raffaello Battino's code name became a new identity, however, which he would retain for the rest of his life, long after the Italian Fascist regime and its officials had lost their leader and fallen from power. In 1937, Paolo Vittorelli became a contributor to the movement's weekly political magazine, which was also named Giustizia e Libertà.

=== World War II ===
In 1938, comrades sent him back to Fascist Italy with instructions to make contact with an underground network of Italian anti-fascists, but he was intercepted at the frontier by the Italian police and returned to France, where he was now based until 1940. On 10 May 1940, the Nazi German army invaded France, leaving the northern half of the country under German military occupation and virtually the entire southern part of the country administered by a pro-German puppet government. The Italian Fascist regime declared war on France in June 1940 and launched its own invasion from the south-east.

During this period, Vittorelli had been sent on a fund-raising mission to the Kingdom of Egypt on behalf of Giustizia e Libertà (GL). Developments in France made a return to Paris unrealistic and he relocated to Cairo. He managed to establish a relationship of uneasy mutual acceptance with the British administration, and over the next four years became increasingly effective as an anti-fascist publicist. Vittorelli and his comrades undertook an exhaustive four-year programme of visits to the prisoner-of-war camps, where they engaged with Italian captives and shared their anti-fascist convictions.

In addition, Vittorelli worked as a journalist and directed the Corriere degli Italiani, an Italian-language newspaper affiliated to Giustizia e Libertà (GL) and published in Cairo. He also taught "History of Economic Theory" and "International Law" at Cairo University's French Faculty of Jurisprudence. After the arrest and downfall of Benito Mussolini in July 1943 and the launch of the Anglo-American invasion of Southern Italy, Vittorelli made his way back to Italy and joined the recently launched anti-monarchist anti-fascist Action Party (PdA) in 1944. He accepted appointment as editor-in-chief of the Piedmont edition of the party's clandestine newspaper L'Italia Libera, following editor Ginzburg's arrest and death by torture.

=== Socialist ructions in the Italian Republic ===
After the end of World War II in Italy, the Action Party broke apart and formally dissolved on 25 October 1947. There were particularly irreconcilable differences over whether and to what extent the party should be prepared to work with political parties and politicians tainted by their former association with Italian fascism. Eventually, most comrades switched to the Italian Socialist Party (PSI). At this stage, however, Vittorelli lined up with other purists, including Tristano Codignola, Piero Calamandrei, Aldo Garòsci, and Giuseppe Faravelli to establish the Azione Socialista Giustizia e Libertà ("Socialist Action for Justice and Freedom"), a socialist-democratic political third force which drew intellectually and spiritually on the legacy of the pre-war anti-fascist Giustizia e Libertà movement. The newspaper L'Italia Libera, no longer a clandestine publication, evolved into L'Italia Socialista, a mouthpiece representing Azione Socialista Giustizia e Libertà. Vittorelli served as vice-director of the newspaper alongside Garòsci.

On 8 February 1948, Azione Socialista Giustizia e Libertà gave birth to the Unione dei Socialisti (UdS), a political party created by Ivan Matteo Lombardo. The new party then linked up with other left-leaning political parties to form Unità Socialista. The overriding objective was to preclude an East German-style Moscow-backed political alliance with the Italian Communist Party (PCI) ahead of the critically important 1948 general election. A year later, following an election outcome which had disappointed socialists and communists alike, a further political coming together on the political centre-left created the Partito Socialista Unitario (PSU). Vittorelli was appointed party deputy secretary and permanent delegate to the re-emerging Socialist International. Finally, on 1 May 1951, a fusion of the Partito Socialista dei Lavoratori Italiani (Italian Socialist Workers' Party; PSLI) and the PSU created a unified party of the non-communist left, the Partito Socialista - Sezione Italiana dell'Internazionale Socialista (PS-SIIS) which rebranded itself in January 1952 as the Partito Socialista Democratico Italiano (Italian Democratic Socialist Party; PSDI). Vittorelli was not entirely comfortable with this outcome.

The so-called Scam Law proposed by the government early in 1953 appalled Vittorelli, as did the attitude of the PSDI to the government proposal to distort general election results by awarding extra parliamentary seats to whichever party gained the most votes. Together with Tristano Codignola, Piero Calamandrei, and Aldo Garòsci, Vittorelli resigned from the PSDI and joined the Unità Popolare (UP), a newly formed coalition of democrats from the political centre and left which came together to oppose the Fraud Law. The law was passed by parliament, but would be repealed in 1954 without ever having been implemented, apparently because the government, still in power, but with a greatly reduced majority following the 1953 general election, concluded that it was becoming so unpopular with voters as to be electorally counter-productive. The UP failed to achieve significant traction with voters. It nevertheless limped on for several years. On 28 November 1954, the UP party central committee elected Paolo Vittorelli to a senior position as a member of the party executive.

=== Return to the Socialist mainstream ===
In 1957, the UP re-joined the PSI. In 1963, Vittorelli was one of seven candidates elected to membership of the Senate (IV Legislature) by voters in the Basilicata electoral district, whom he represented on behalf of the Socialist Party. The others from Basilicata were Christian Democrats (4) and Communists (2). Across the country, the Socialists ranked third in the Senate, securing 44 of the 315 seats, against 85 for the Communists and 132 for the Christian Democrats. Vittorelli served as a senator for the full five-year term, until 1968. During his time in the Senate, he also found time to publish a translation into Italian of Isaiah Berlin's 1939 biography of Karl Marx. Vittorelli's translation, which appears to have been the first written in Italian, appeared in 1967; it was republished a number of times, most recently in 2021. The 2004 edition is enhanced by an introduction from Bruno Bongiovanni.

Paolo Vittorelli stood for election in the 1970 Piedmontese regional election as a PSI candidate and was elected. In terms of party votes the Socialists were comfortably outperformed in the election, but no party gained an overall majority and the regional government was therefore a PSI–DC coalition-led administration. Presidency of the regional council alternated between the two parties. Between 23 July 1970 and 3 March 1972, Paolo Vittorelli served as president of the Piedmont regional council.

Later during the decade Vittorelli was a founder, in 1979, of the Istituto Studi e Ricerche Difesa ("Institute of Defence Studies and Research"), thereafter serving as the first president of the institute. He also served as editor-director of Lettera Istrid, the journal of the institute.

=== Editor and politician ===
Between June 1969 and May 1976, Vittorelli worked as editorial director at Il Lavoro, a PSI-affiliated daily newspaper produced for the Genoa region. The overall direction of the paper remained, in principle, with Sandro Pertini, but he had been forced to abandon his editorial desk and duties at the paper through his election the previous year to the Presidency of the Chamber of Deputies, in Rome. In terms of approach, as two experienced socialist pragmatists, Vittorelli and Pertini were evidently broadly aligned politically.

In 1972, Vittorelli stood successfully for election to the Chamber of Deputies as a Socialist Party member for the Torino-Novara-Vercelli electoral district. He served as a member of parliament throughout the 1972–1976 and 1976–1979 parliamentary sessions.

=== Authorship ===
During his later decades, Vittorelli turned increasingly to writing books. At the 1981 Viareggio Prize ceremony, he was recipient of the President's Prize for his memoires of the defunct Action Party, "L'età della tempesta. Autobiografia romanzata di una generazione". He followed through in 1998 with a sequel, also based on his knowledge of the Action Party, titled "L'età della speranza. Testimonianze e ricordi del Partito d’Azione" and dealing with what one source identifies as the party's "militant years" ("... agli anni della militanza").

=== Final years ===
Paolo Vittorelli's final years coincided with further ructions among the left-wing parties of Italy. During the 1990s, the PSI burst apart and collapsed, partly under the weight of its internal contradictions and partly due to the wave of corruption scandals which hit the Italian political class at that time. In 1998, taking his lead from Valdo Spini, who was also a former PSI member, Vittorelli joined the Democratici di Sinistra (DS), a coming together of formerly separate centre-left groupings hoping to construct a modern European Social Democratic party.
