= Ivor Bulmer-Thomas =

British journalist and author (1905–1993)

Ivor Bulmer-Thomas CBE FSA

Parliamentary Secretary to the Air Ministry
- In office 10 August 1945 – 4 October 1946

Under-Secretary of State for the Colonies
- In office 4 October 1946 – 1947

Member of Parliament for Keighley
- In office 13 February 1942 – 3 February 1950
- Preceded by: Hastings Lees-Smith
- Succeeded by: Charles Hobson

Personal details
- Born: Ivor Thomas; 30 November 1905
- Died: 7 October 1993 (aged 87)
- Party: Labour (until 1948); Conservative (1949–81); SDP (from 1981)

Ivor Bulmer-Thomas (30 November 1905 – 7 October 1993), born Ivor Thomas, was a British journalist and scientific writer who served eight years as a Member of Parliament (MP). His career was much influenced by his conversion to the Church of England in his youth, and he became a pious believer on the Anglo-Catholic wing of the Church.

A brilliant scholar and champion athlete while at university, Bulmer-Thomas wrote biographies and worked as a sub-editor on The Times during his early life. His experience in wartime Italian propaganda led him to doubt its value. Serving in the Attlee Labour Party government in junior roles made him resent the influence of the Labour left; he fell out with party policy on nationalisation and moved to the Conservative Party. He was a workaholic and after leaving politics he became a leading layman in the Church of England; an interest in historic buildings led him to set up the Friends of Friendless Churches group, which campaigns to prevent churches falling into disuse, and to play a key role in founding the charity known today as the Churches Conservation Trust.

== Family and faith ==
Thomas was born in Cwmbran, Monmouthshire; his father A.E. Thomas, was working class. He went to West Monmouth School in Pontypool, where he abandoned his father's Baptist faith in favour of the Anglo-Catholic wing of the Church of England, a decision that was to affect his future career profoundly. Although a pious believer, his personal piety was described by Robin Denniston in his Guardian obituary as "always gentle and humble".

== Oxford ==
Performing well at school, Thomas won a scholarship to St John's College, Oxford, where he studied both Mathematical Mods. and Literae Humaniores (known unofficially as 'Greats' and as 'Classics' at other universities), obtaining Firsts in both. He then turned to study divinity, but fell into dispute with the president of the college and moved instead to Magdalen College where he became Senior Demy in Theology. He was the Liddon Student in 1928, the Ellerton Essayist in 1929, and the Junior Denyer and Johnson Scholar in 1930.

Thomas' achievements at Oxford were not confined to academic life; he also became a competitive cross country runner. He represented Oxford in varsity matches against Cambridge from 1925 to 1927, in which year he won the three-miles race. In 1926 he had represented his country, Wales, in international cross-country running. But for an injury he would have stood a good chance of selection in the Great Britain team for the 1928 Summer Olympics in Amsterdam.

== Author ==
On leaving Oxford, Thomas became the Gladstone Research Student at St Deiniol's Library in Hawarden, the residential library founded at William Ewart Gladstone's former house. The product of his research there was a book on Gladstone's son, published under the title Gladstone of Hawarden in 1936. This book was preceded into print by a biography of Lord Birkenhead, published in 1930 (the year its subject died). Thomas had come to know Birkenhead through his interest in university athletics and the book has been described as witty and entertaining; it was dedicated to "my creditors". David Fowler noted the following works

- Illustrating the History of Greek Mathematics (1939–1941), Loeb Classical Library
- The Socialist Tragedy, Latimer House (1949)
- Contributed substantial articles to the authoritative Dictionary of Scientific Biography (1970–1990)
- The section on Greek geometry in Geschichte der Algebra (1990)
- Sections in Lehrbücher zur Didaktik der Mathematik
- Reviewer for Classical Reviews on ancient science and mathematics; contributor of articles to journals and encyclopaedias.

== Journalism ==
Thomas joined the staff of The Times newspaper in 1930, where he served in the sub-editors' room. He also wrote occasional leader columns and specialist articles on scientific subjects as well as being a sports correspondent for a brief period. He married Dilys Llewelyn Jones in 1932, who bore him a son.

In 1935, owed some leave from The Times, Thomas took it to coincide with the general election for which he had been chosen as Labour Party candidate for Spen Valley in July. The sitting Member of Parliament was Sir John Simon, the Home Secretary and the contest was a high-profile one; although Simon was elected, his margin of 642 votes was closer than expected and was said to have given him a fright.

== Bereavement ==
Thomas moved to the News Chronicle in 1937 as chief leader writer, finding the time to write a biography of Welsh industrialist David Davies which was published the following year. However, tragedy struck with the death of his wife in childbirth in the same year. Thomas' reaction was to write "Dilysia", a threnody which combined his increasing love of Italian literature (especially Dante) with a Christian philosophical analysis of suffering and bereavement. In later life Thomas was to identify it as his favourite piece of writing, and it was republished in 1987. Thomas needed only four hours sleep, and kept volumes of Dante in the original mediaeval Italian by his bedside to read at night.

== Wartime service ==
As the Second World War threatened, Thomas enlisted in 1938 in a Territorial battalion of the Royal Fusiliers as a fusilier, equivalent to a private. In 1940 he was commissioned into the Royal Norfolk Regiment. While in the Army, he wrote a two-volume work Selections Illustrating the History of Greek Mathematics which was published by the Loeb Classical Library. He was promoted to captain in 1941.

=== Propaganda work ===
As a fluent Italian speaker, Thomas was drafted into the psychological warfare department of the Foreign Office and Ministry of Information with a brief to develop propaganda for use against Mussolini's Italy. Thomas wrote a 1942 book for Penguin Books called Warfare by Words which criticised British propaganda efforts, and defined the term as an act of "sabotage leading to revolution".

== Parliament ==
=== Election ===
After leaving propaganda work, Thomas was appointed as intelligence officer in the Cambridge area. In January 1942, he was chosen as Labour Party candidate for the Keighley byelection caused by the death of Hastings Lees-Smith. The political parties had agreed an electoral truce, and a threatened Independent candidacy by B. D. Margerison of Wibsey in Bradford came to nothing when Margerison decided not to stand (despite having issued an election address). Thomas was therefore elected unopposed on 13 February.

=== Maiden speech ===
Thomas' maiden speech on 12 March concerned pensions, during which he argued that the means test was "a blot on our national honour". He described the principle of supporting those unable to work as "the iron ration of citizenship". In his early period in Parliament he concentrated on propaganda concerns, in which he disagreed with Stephen King-Hall's call for it to be treated on the same level as the three services. Thomas argued that this was an "entirely false perspective" and that propaganda was a "valuable but ancillary weapon".

=== Activity ===
In November 1942, Thomas worked with Aneurin Bevan and an all-party group of Members of Parliament to put down a motion opposing British co-operation with Admiral Darlan in French North Africa. He was also active on domestic issues, supporting the movement to allow Sunday opening of theatres, and for his stance he was denounced by the Lord's Day Observance Society. At a meeting of the society in February 1943, one prayer asked God to "deal with Ivor Thomas as he dealt with Saul of Tarsus". (Saul is said in Acts 9:4 to have been converted hearing a voice from Heaven saying "Saul, Saul, why are you persecuting me?")

Thomas became a very active Member of Parliament, intervening in many debates on diverse subjects both domestic and foreign. In January 1945 he was also a speaker at the inaugural meeting of the League for European Freedom, a group which worked to restore the sovereignty of all "lesser European Powers existing in 1937" and for democratic government throughout Europe. With the end of the war in sight, in April 1945 Thomas drew attention to a speech by Ernest Bevin which called for Government and Opposition to share common ground on foreign policy and defence by sharing information.

== Government ==
=== Ministry of Civil Aviation ===
At the 1945 general election Thomas was easily re-elected. When he saw the list of Government Ministers appointed by Clement Attlee, Thomas took the unusual step of writing to the new prime minister to ask why his own name had not appeared on it. Attlee decided to find Thomas an appointment, and made him Parliamentary Secretary to the Ministry of Civil Aviation on 10 August 1945. He was the Ministry's spokesman in the House of Commons as the Minister was Lord Winster. Thomas took over responsibility for the building of London Heathrow Airport, then known as 'Heath Row', which had been started by the Royal Air Force during the war.

Thomas felt that he could only truly understand his job if he obtained a Private Pilot's Licence, and took up flying until he passed. In 1946 he had responsibility for taking the Civil Aviation Bill through the House of Commons; the Bill was controversial in that it nationalised air transport into three corporations which were originally intended to have commercial freedom. Winster and Thomas were forced by left-wing pressure within the Labour Party to revisit the plans and make the corporations public monopolies. Some Labour Members were concerned that Thomas, still a young man with little experience of the heavy work of Parliament, was in charge of such an important Bill. Despite a gruelling passage, including an all day Standing Committee session, the Bill was enacted on schedule on 1 August.

=== Colonies Office ===
On 4 October 1946 Thomas was moved to be Under-Secretary for the Colonies, a shift which he later ascribed to an act of weakness by Attlee in giving in to left-wing pressure after the dispute over the Civil Aviation Bill. With this appointment he was also a delegate to the General Assembly of the United Nations. He negotiated at the United Nations over continued British administration of the colonies of Tanganyika, Togoland and the Cameroons, against attempts by the Soviet Union to limit the extent of control. Early the next year he intervened in a strike in Singapore, helping to persuade 7,000 municipal labourers to return to work. The Colonies Office also had responsibility for Palestine under the British mandate, in which he followed government policy of resisting illegal immigration (which was predominantly Jewish).

== Crossing the floor ==
Despite thoughts that Thomas might be 'leadership material', Attlee dropped him from the government on 7 October 1947, a dismissal which was unexpected. The reason was Thomas' increasing disillusion with socialism. In March 1948 he spoke at an Italian election rally for the moderate Union of Socialists (UdS) (Note: The UdS was an anti-communist party led by Ivan Matteo Lombardo and Ignazio Silone, which was then in an electoral pact with the similarly-moderate Italian Socialist Workers' Party (PSLI). These parties (and their supporters) were commonly referred to in the press as 'social democrats' rather than 'socialists', so differentiating them from the hard-left Italian Socialist Party.) calling for a federation of Europe; when it was revealed that left-wing Labour Members of Parliament had sent a telegram of support to Pietro Nenni, leader of the rival Italian Socialist Party (PSI) – which was fighting the forthcoming election as part of a Popular Front with the Italian Communist Party – Thomas signed a motion calling for a Select Committee to investigate.

On 13 October 1948 Thomas wrote to The Times to urge the government to "drop all contentious legislation" in the forthcoming Parliamentary session, specifically the Parliament Bill and the Iron and Steel Bill, prompting considerable debate. Immediately after the King's Speech in which both Bills were included, Thomas wrote to Attlee announcing his resignation from the Labour Party. He said he had been "particularly disturbed by the growing concentration of power in the hands of the State" and accused the government of surrendering "to its more extreme members and supporters".

=== Stormy speech ===
When Thomas rose to speak in the debate the following day, it became clear that leaving the Labour Party had cost him many friendships. Hyacinth Morgan intervened in his speech to ask whether he would stand for re-election immediately under his new colours; Thomas replied that he had consulted the precedent of Tom Horabin who had moved from the Liberals to Labour without so doing. When Thomas declared that the Labour slogan reversed the Christian declaration "What is mine is thine" to say "What is thine is mine", Morgan shouted at him "You are a dirty dog!". The Speaker ordered Morgan to withdraw the words. In his conclusion, Thomas implicitly praised the leadership of Winston Churchill.

During the rest of the Parliament, Thomas was treated by Labour Members as a pariah. He formed an unofficial group of two with Alfred Edwards who had also left Labour over the nationalisation of steel, and in the new year he formally announced he had joined the Conservative Party; simultaneously it was announced that he had been adopted as Conservative Party candidate for Newport (Monmouthshire), near his birthplace. However, he did not receive the Conservative Whip until Whitsun. Thomas made an attacking speech at the 1949 Conservative Party Conference: referring to Harold Wilson's remark that half the children in his class never had any boots, Thomas gibed that "if ever he went to school without any boots it was because he was too big for them". He wrote a book called The Socialist Tragedy which was published that year.

=== Defeat ===
When the general election came round, Thomas found himself with a formidable task in trying to win Newport. Thomas had family connections and his stance on steel nationalisation was thought to be popular, but he found the voters not very interested. Thomas was defeated by the heavy margin of 9,992 votes.

== Return to journalism ==
Thomas' first action on losing his seat was to go with a group of friends to drive across the Sahara desert. He then returned to journalism, becoming a reviewer for The Times Literary Supplement and writing obituaries for The Times. His contributions were anonymous in print but he is known to have been responsible for many important obituaries including that of Bertrand Russell. From 1953 to 1954, he was acting deputy editor of The Daily Telegraph.

By this time, he had changed his surname. In 1940 he had married (at Hereford Cathedral) Joan Bulmer, from Hereford, by whom he had a son and two daughters; in April 1952 he took the additional surname 'Bulmer-' by deed poll to acknowledge her. His son by his second marriage is Victor Bulmer-Thomas, formerly director of Chatham House.

== Church of England ==
In the same year as losing his Parliamentary seat, Bulmer-Thomas had found a seat in the House of Laity of the Church Assembly. There, as he had at Westminster, he intervened frequently in debate with some extravagant and controversial speeches. The issue which had become the most pressing for Bulmer-Thomas on the Church Assembly was the care of the fabric of churches. In 1951 he was appointed chairman of the London Diocesan Advisory Committee on the care of Churches, and in June of that year he successfully moved a motion in the Church Assembly to set up a £4 million trust for the preservation of historic churches.

The Historic Churches Preservation Trust achieved its desired funding and persuaded the Church Assembly to pass the Inspection of Churches Measure, to properly assess the condition of old churches every five years. Bulmer-Thomas' obituary in The Independent commented that "more than any other single Act, this modest Measure has prevented many of those sudden 'repairs crises' which carry off too many fine churches".

=== Dispute with the archbishop ===
On 13 July 1956 long-running tensions within the Historic Churches Preservation Trust came out in the open. Bulmer-Thomas wanted the trust to save every threatened church, which included intervening with Dioceses to persuade them not to demolish unwanted churches which had lost their congregations. Other trustees, allied with the Archbishop of Canterbury, Geoffrey Fisher, thought that local autonomy should be preserved. When Bulmer-Thomas failed to persuade the trust to adopt his policy, the trust was dissolved and a new executive committee set up in which he was not involved.

At the Church Assembly on 15 November 1956, Bulmer-Thomas attacked Fisher, saying that he "held a pistol to my face while the Dean of Gloucester plunged his dagger into my back", which shocked some listeners. Bulmer-Thomas went away and made his own plans.

=== Friends of Friendless Churches ===
On 12 August 1957 Bulmer-Thomas announced the formation of the Friends of Friendless Churches, with himself as acting chairman and honorary secretary; he stressed that the group "is in no sense a rival to any existing body". The Friends followed the policy Bulmer-Thomas had hoped the trust would adopt, opposing any suggestion of the demolition of a church. He saw some considerable success but became an even more controversial figure with those who saw new uses of old churches as being an inevitable development.

By the time of Bulmer-Thomas' death, it was estimated that the Friends had by their own efforts actively saved 17 churches, and helped to rescue many more; They had become the guardians of 21 separate churches. While many disagreed with Bulmer-Thomas' approach, his commitment was clear.

=== Churches Conservation Trust ===
In 1969 Bulmer-Thomas was made the first chairman of the Redundant Churches Fund, known today as the Churches Conservation Trust, the national charity protecting historic churches at risk. Bulmer-Thomas was in charge of it for seven years. As of 2015 this body has over 345 historic churches in its care, visited by almost 2 million people a year.

=== Other activity ===
Bulmer-Thomas had other involvement in the field of heritage, being Secretary of the Ancient Monuments Society from 1958; he served on the society's council for more than 30 years and was its chairman from 1975 to 1990. In 1970 he became a Fellow of the Society of Antiquaries of London. In addition he became a Churchwarden at St Andrew-by-the-Wardrobe in the City of London, where he conducted an 'Advanced Sunday School'; he had a special bond to the Church, having fought to have it rebuilt after bomb damage in the Second World War. His interest in journalism and connection to the Church led him to get involved in the Society of the Faith and the Faith Press, which it owned as a specialist printing firm.

=== Honours ===
He never attempted to return to politics, but he did write The Growth of the British Party System in two volumes in 1965; it was poorly received. In 1981 he became a member of the newly founded Social Democratic Party, although he was not active. He was a hard worker, but in 1985 he stood down from the General Synod after 35 years' membership of it and its predecessor. He received several honours, including an honorary Fellowship of St John's College, Oxford (his alma mater), and the CBE for his work in preserving churches in 1984, which Bulmer-Thomas quipped stood for "Churches Before Evangelism".

He received two honorary degrees, that from the University of Warwick in 1979 being at the insistence of the Mathematics Department. On his 80th birthday, the Ancient Monuments Society published a Festschrift in his honour, paying tribute to the diversity of his interests.

Bulmer-Thomas was reported to have been working "literally till a few minutes before his death" on a letter to the Daily Telegraph, which was published on the same day as his obituary appeared.

== Notes ==
Parliament of the United Kingdom
Preceded by Hastings Lees-Smith	Member of Parliament for Keighley; 1942 – 1950	Succeeded by Charles Hobson
Political offices
Preceded by Robert Perkins	Parliamentary Secretary to the Ministry of Civil Aviation; 1945 – 1946	Succeeded by George Lindgren
Preceded by Arthur Creech Jones	Under-Secretary of State for the Colonies; 1946 – 1947	Succeeded by David Rees-Williams
Media offices
Preceded by Malcolm Muggeridge	Deputy Editor of The Daily Telegraph; 1953–1954	Succeeded by Donald McLachlan
