= Aldo Garòsci =

Italian politician

- Born: 13 October 1907; Meana di Susa, Province of Turin, Piedmont, Italy
- Died: 3 January 2000 (aged 92); Rome, Italy
- Education: Turin
- Occupations: Antifascist activist Political Journalist-Commentator; Historian; Author; Politician
- Political party: PdA (1943–47); PSDI (1947–53; since 1969); UP (1953–57); PSI (1957–66); PSU (1966–69)
- Spouse(s): 1. (Blanche) Madeleine Bride; 2. Irene Nunberg (1911–1995)
- Children: 1
- Parents: Antonio Garosci (1861–1941) (father); Alessandra Sampò (1879–1938) (mother)

Aldo Garòsci (13 October 1907 – 3 January 2000) was an Italian historian, socialist, anti-fascist activist-politician and, in his later professional career, a leading political journalist-commentator.

== Provenance and early life ==
Aldo Garòsci was born at Meana di Susa, a small mountain town overlooking the Susa Valley, roughly equidistant between Turin, to the east, and the mountain pass across into Savoy, to the west. Aldo was his father's third son. Antonio Garosci (1861–1941) was not originally from Piedmont. He had been born in Sanremo down by the coast. Antonio Garosci worked as a businessman-entrepreneur in the agri-foods sector. Despite having arrived as outsiders, by the time of Aldo's birth, the Garosci family were well networked in the valley. His mother, born Alessandra Sampò (1879–1938) was significantly younger than her husband. She had been born at Bene Vagienna (Cuneo), another small mountain town, located in the extreme south of Piedmont. Alessandra Sampò had grown up in a family of middle class intellectuals. Her sister Nelda was married to the noted medievalist Giorgio Falco, whom she had met at the University of Turin.

== Education ==
He attended elementary school locally and then moved on, like many sons of the Piedmontese "haute-bourgeoisie" to the Jesuit Istituto sociale in Turin: contemporaries included the writers Mario Soldati and Carlo Dionisotti. In 1925 Garòsci enrolled at the university in order to study for a degree in literature, as his aunt Nelda Falco had done. After a year he switched to Law, however. In 1929 he obtained a degree in Legal Philosophy with a dissertation concerning "Jean Bodin's Republic", which subsequently formed the basis for Garòsci's own first published book. His university studies were supervised by Gioele Solari, a strikingly large number of whose students later achieved notability (or, in the eyes of many governments, notoriety) as active anti-fascists: these included Piero Gobetti, Mario Andreis, Giorgio Agosti, Dante Livio Bianco, Norberto Bobbio and Alessandro Passerin d'Entrèves.

== Politicisation ==
Three years before Garòsci enrolled at the university, Mussolini's Fascists had taken power. After 1924 the country's political leaders had abandoned any supposed commitment to democracy, and thuggery was becoming ever more widely accepted as a legitimate tool of government. Turin was emerging in this period as a bedrock of anti-fascist thought and ideas, due to the presence of personalities such as Antonio Gramsci and Piero Gobetti. For Garòsci, his time as a student was a period of rapid politicisation. He was influenced in particular by two student contemporaries, the would-be regicide Fernando de Rosa and, a little later, by the activist-artist Carlo Levi. He first came across Levi in the group that had centred round Gobetti, to which Garòsci was increasingly drawn during and after 1926. (1926 was also the year of Gobetti's early death following a savage physical assault by fascist thugs.) Through these friends, and others, Garosci became familiar with antifascist philosophical themes of the time, such as liberal activism ("attivistica del liberalismo"), to be viewed more as a process than as some fixed - and thereby contentious - objective. He learned to take a closer interest in the labour movement, and in international developments involving "workers' soviets". Towards the end of the 1920s these themes came together to form, for him, a metapolitical and existential conceptual framework of antifascism which was, in more simple terms, a total opposition to everything that the government represented.

After graduating his study in Law in 1929, he began his political career, which for an antifascist in a fascist one-party state involved illegal political activism. While they were students the antifascist opposition in which Garòsci had engaged was largely restricted to student demonstrations within the university premises. The practical and conspiratorial dimensions of opposition were intensified at the end of 1929 when Aldo Garòsci joined Giustizia e Libertà (Justice and Liberty), a somewhat disparate grouping of Italian activists united in their hatred of fascism, which had been established a few months earlier by a number of political refugees centred around Carlo Rosselli and living, by this stage, in Paris. Adherents, who were keen not to be identified simply as "another political party", used for themselves the acronym "Giellisti".

In 1929/30 Garòsci also teamed up with Mario Andreis to produce, briefly, an underground newspaper, "Voci d'officina", inspired by Gobettian ideas and pursuing the mission of Il Baretti, a periodical political magazine founded by Gobetti back in 1924 which, following several years of intensifying government harassment had finally been closed down in 1928. Another important member of the little group of activists operating alongside Garòsci was Carlo Dionisotti, a political soulmate who twenty years later would emigrate to England, becoming a professor of Italian literature first at Oxford and then at London. Garosci and Dionisotti had been good friends since their time at school together.

== Paris exile ==
Garòsci emerged during this period as a leading organiser of the "Giellisti" in Turin, which quickly became one of the most resolute and well organised such groups in Italy. The underground journal Voci d'officina was designed as a core information and networking medium between antifascists across northern Italy. It was also part of the Gobettian mission to build a dialogue between "bourgeois" antifascism and the Italian labour movement. Despite the evident paucity on the ground of "bourgeois-proletarian" connections, these aspirations represented a threat to the Fascist state: during or before 1931 the "Giellisti" activities in Turin came to the attention of the police, who dismantled the entire Turin network during the Autumn of 1931. Andreis and others involved in producing Voci d'officina were arrested after just three editions had been produced, during December 1931. Garòsci managed to avoid the police, but the ongoing dangers in Turin were obvious. On 12 January 1932 he succeeded in escaping to France where he joined up with the exiled Giustizia e Libertà leadership in Paris.

The nine years during which Aldo Garòsci was based in Paris marked a period of important intellectual and personal development. The group had launched its own Paris-based weekly "mouth-piece" (antifascist political journal), also called Giustizia e Libertà, and he quickly became a key member of the team involved in producing this, along with the movement's other more intermittently produced antifascist publications. Among the others involved, those who became particular friends included Franco Venturi, Carlo Levi and, above all, the man to whom the others looked for inspiration and direction, Carlo Rosselli. Garòsci quickly became a convinced adherent of Rosselli's "liberal socialism" (with a distinctively Italian flavour), but such backing was necessarily accompanied by appropriately pertinent criticism. Indeed, it was only after the movement proved receptive to the insistence which Garòsci advanced on behalf of Turin - and in which he was supported by Levi - on the need to incorporate critiques of traditional socialism and liberalism in the underlying philosophy of the "Giellisti" along with a focus on the importance of the working class as a revolutionary force, that he himself became one of the most strident backers of the Rosselli line.

Endless ideological debates and the weekly production of Giustizia e Libertà (and related publications) were not the only aspects of the political activism pursued by the antifascist "Giellisti" from their Parisian exile. They sustained contacts to the full extent possible with anti-government resistance movements back in Italy, providing as much support as possible, with a particular focus on those parts of the country in which antifascism was less deeply entrenched. Compared to some of the comrades, Aldo Garòsci was in a relatively fortunate position. The financial support he received from his family enabled him to devote all his energies to his work as a "Giellista". Later during the 1930s he was employed as an assistant to the internationally well-connected art critic and author, Lionello Venturi. Venturi was the father of Garòsci's close friend and school contemporary Franco Venturi, and was one of just eighteen Italian university professors who, in 1931, had refused the government order to sign their "Oath of Loyalty to Fascism". He had therefore been removed from his professorship in Art History at the University of Rome and lived, between 1931 and 1940, in France, before living out the final years of the Mussolini nightmare in New York City, while lecturing at a range of North American universities.

It was also during his time in Paris that Garòsci teamed up with (Blanche) Madeleine Bride: they now shared their lives till Garòsci's political exile came to an end. There were also a number of new friendships that now became life-long with his fellow political activists who became, after 1945, prominent members of Italy's post-war political and journalistic establishment, including Alberto Cianca, Fernando Schiavetti, Paolo Battino Vittorelli and, most importantly, Leo Valiani. It was with Valiani and the friend of his school years, Franco Venturi, that he became particularly close, not just in terms of personal friendship but also as enduring intellectual soulmates.

== Spanish Civil War ==
After several years of growing instability the Spanish Civil War broke out in 1936. Among the Italian "Giellisti" in Paris, Garòsci was among the first to understand what was going on. He took a lead, travelling to Barcelona that summer to make direct contact with republican leaders. He then made his contribution, during the early months of the war, as a member of the Italian unit - shortly afterwards renamed as the "Matteotti Battalion" - led by Rosselli. The battalion enjoyed early success in August 1936, as part of the army that defeated the Francoists at Monte Pelado. But Garòsci was forced by a wound received at Huesca, during the battle to abandon the military front, and escape across the Pyrenees mountains to France. After this he became a tireless warrior in the parallel propaganda war through his contributions to the movement's weekly publication, Giustizia e Libertà. In the decades that followed, it became clear that those impassioned journalistic contributions were themselves only the introduction to his part in propagating, during the ensuing decades, the legendary and heroic character of the antifascist intervention in the Spanish War. The entire Spanish experience does indeed seem to have represented a decisive juncture in Garòsci's life, and a never to be repeated point of existential commitment to causes in which his belief was seemingly total. The model provided by the "Catalan Revolution" in particular, with its peculiar elements of spontaneity and self-government, became a paradigm which he would continue to reference for many years.

== After Rosselli ==
In June 1937, Carlo Rosselli and his brother Nello were murdered by Cagoule paramilitaries at Bagnoles-de-l'Orne, west of Paris: evidence later surfaced that the killing was performed under contract from Mussolini. Garòsci took on the leadership of the "Giellisti", together with Alberto Cianca, Fernando Schiavetti, Emilio Lussu and Silvio Trentin, all trying, without very much success, to continue along the path Carlo Rosselli had set. That meant attempting to unite the antifascist revolutionary forces, which in turn involved trying to establish dialogue with "proletarian parties". In a decade of intensifying political polarisation, and after his participation in a civil war in which the contribution of Soviet proxies sometimes seemed to be driven more by Stalin's paranoid determination to confront a Trotskyite conspiracy than by any shared interest in defeating fascism, Garòsci's own deep-seated suspicion of communist-authoritarianism precluded meaningful co-operation with parties of the political left, however.

In French historiography the outbreak of the Second World War is generally set at September 1939, which was when Germany and the Soviet Union invaded Poland, respectively from the west, and from the south and east. The French government, partly in response to British pressure, responded very quickly by declaring war on Germany; but on the streets of Paris - even, to a lesser extent for foreign political refugees who had taken refuge in the city - daily life did not change so much. A more traumatic development, in May 1940, was the German invasion of France, which culminated in French acknowledgement of military defeat, formalised in a 26-year-old (but "symbolically important") railway wagon near Compiègne on 22 June 1940. The Mussolini government, having hitherto stood back from becoming involved in the European war, declared war on 10 June 1940, launching its own short-lived invasion of France from the south-east: this was intercepted by French forces and terminated through an armistice formalised on 24 June 1940. Nevertheless, Italy was now a belligerent in World War II alongside Germany and the northern half of France, including Paris, where Garòsci and the "Giellisti" had found sanctuary from fascism for the last nine years, was under German military administration. Garòsci, with many of the others, now fled to the United States. He was, of course, accompanied in New York by Madeleine Bride, though it is unclear whether they actually crossed the Atlantic together. In New York, Garòsci and Bride kept their distance from the local antifascist community: Garòsci concentrated on producing Italian-language antifascist propaganda for dissemination in Italy and on works of less transient scholarship.

== New York ==
The journey to New York was far from direct. After fleeing to southern France, Garòsci travelled in a group of around fourteen Italian antifascist activist comrades via Marseille, Algiers and Casablanca. There were long waits in north Africa. Almost certainly, their escape was only possible because of a succession of heroic and skilful interventions at a bureaucratic and logistical level by Emilio Lussu and Varian Fry. They arrived in New York in August 1941. During their time in New York Aldo Garòsci and Madeleine Bride were married between August 1941 and June 1943. The marriage seems to have ended in an amicable annulment when Garòsci returned to Italy to participate in the fighting there.

Garòsci's affectionate and philosophically insightful biography of Carlo Rosselli was published only in 1945, but he undertook most of the work on it during his time in New York. It incorporates a complex attempt to arrange into a theoretical structure the political perspective which, for the most part, Garòsci and Rosselli had shared: it is probably the best known of Garòsci's books. It presents a comprehensive view of the author's own historiographical vision, combining an effortless authority and scope reminiscent of Benedetto Croce with a singular insistence on differentiating between memory and history, as between personal testimony and documentary research. His historicist vision was on display in his constant search for the underlying spiritual and philosophical elements to be detected inside political and social phenomena, and in his frequent application of an idealist lexicon. The same differentiating strategy led him to distinguish clearly between those elements in historical developments that he identified as "vital", and those that were residual. He insisted on clearly differentiating between the past - even the recent past- and the present, and in doing so he included a deep structural continuity in his reading of history that separated it from mere chronology or news.

At the same time Garòsci took time to spell out, in a series of articles in the publication Quaderni Italiani (loosely, "Italian Notebooks") published by his fellow New York-based "Giellista", Bruno Zevi, what he would later identify as his own "personal Utopia", and which he himself described as an update, in the light of his experiences in 1930s France, of the Gobettian perspective he had picked up as a student in Turin. The centrality of "autonomy" dates back to these, both in its collective dimension concerning the freedom of the socially responsible to organise and manage their own lives, and in terms of the ability of the individual to determine elements of his or her own existence. This was completed and contextualised through his conception of differentiation, postulating a societal model according to which the different spheres (economic, political, cultural, spiritual) were expressly separated and separately ordered, each according to its own independently derived sets of principals. In this model, which was probably influenced by Croce's "theory of distinctions", Garòsci brings together his reflections on totalitarianism, with its "tendency to centralize and bureaucratize", and those on a liberal-socialist society, in his contribution to Quaderni Italiani of 1944 (vol.4), drawing on ideas he had formulated with Valiani and Franco Venturi during the later 1930s, and then further developed while living in New York. Finally, the antitotalitarian model adumbrated here, which should have encompassed all the possible political alternatives for a future society, stems directly from Rosselli's proposal for a single party of the proletariat.

== Resistance and the Action Party ==
Prompted by the Grand Council, the king had Mussolini arrested on Sunday, 25 July 1943. Garòsci returned to Italy and, with the active support of the American and British armies invading from the south, crossed the battle lines and made his way on to Rome, entering the city in December 1943. (Large scale fighting in the unforgiving mountains to the south of Rome had temporarily come to a virtual halt out of deference to the winter weather.) He joined up with the rapidly emerging Roman Resistance military operation. Teaming up Riccardo Bauer, he collaborated with the newly relaunched Action Party (Partito d'Azione; PdA), while nevertheless at this stage distancing himself from direct political engagement.

Garòsci stayed faithful to his own vision of an "autonomous revolution", which he shared with various "Giellisti" making their own contribution to the liberation struggle in the fascist puppet state Northern Italy (where the German armies continued the fight to hold off any further Anglo-American military advance). These comrades included many longstanding friends and intellectual heavy-weights such as Giorgio Agosti, Mario Andreis, Leo Valiani, Franco Venturi and Vittorio Foa. That meant subordinating any personal preferences of his own to the "bottom up" initiatives to be expected from the National Liberation Committee (Comitato di Liberazione Nazionale; CLN). It was only after the war ended in 1945, with prospects for the continuity of the state clearly established, that he moved away from his own wilder revolutionary preferences and reverted to a more traditionalist version of Rosselli's "liberal socialist" Hendiadys".

== After fascism and after the war: politics ==
In the war's aftermath Garòsci saw it as his duty to establish a "socialist democratic third force", unencumbered by ties to Christian Democracy or to the reinvigorated Italian Communist Party (PCI), and stand for an agenda of pro-European reform. Thus, in 1947, as the PdA fell apart, he became a founder member of Giuseppe Saragat's moderate, anti-communist Italian Democratic Socialist Party (PSDI) after it had broken away from the Italian Socialist Party (PSI). However, this party gained little traction with the electorate, undermined as it was by Cold War interventionism whereby the Christian Democrats could look to Washington and the Communists could trust in Moscow for lavish financial and other "under the table" backing. That left little fertile ground for a late flowering of social democracy in post-war Italy.

Fairly soon Garòsci abandoned his aspirations to become a hands-on reformist politician. His last great political campaign, in 1953, was his battle against the anti-democratic so-called "Fraud Law" (legge truffa), which gave "any party" winning the most seats in a general election a bonus of extra seats, thereby reducing the propensity of future Italian parliaments to hold governments to account. (The law, though passed by the legislators, was never implemented: it was repealed in 1954.) Garòsci fell out with Saragat over this matter, and upon leaving the PSDI he joined the short-lived Popular Unity (Unità Popolare; UP) party, alongside fellow ex-PSDI intellectuals Tristano Codignola, Piero Calamandrei and Paolo Battino Vittorelli, before seemingly associating with the PSI at some point in the late 1950s. Nevertheless, by this time Garòsci had decided to sustain his political commitment not through the distorting prism of party politics but through his role as a "public intellectual".

== Irene ==
During the liberation struggle Aldo Garòsci and Irene Nunberg (1911–1995) came across one another. Nunberg was originally from Będzin in Silesia (and, after 1918, in Poland). She had been married to Manlio Rossi-Doria since 1937, and had shared his internal exile in Basilicata (near the Gulf of Taranto) till approximately one year before the 1944 liberation, when she had returned to the capital and become a resistance fighter. During the final year of Rome's German occupation she worked as a contributing editor on L'Italia Libera, the clandestine daily newspaper of the PdA. Despite the probable annulment of his marriage in 1943, Garòsci may also have considered himself still married at this time, but fascism and the war had separate each from his/her respective spouse. The two of them teamed up permanently in Rome, and at some point after 1945, married one another. Irene already brought two daughters from her first marriage, Anna and Marina. A third daughter, Adriana, was born in 1950 by her marriage to Garòsci.

== Journalism ==
During the 1930s Garòsci had fallen into political journalism on behalf of the "Giellisti", principally through regular contributions to the movement's weekly newspaper. During the later 1940s he returned to political journalism. Between 1947 and 1949 he took charge at L’Italia socialista, an independent daily newspaper that had grown out of L'Italia libera, which had been discontinued following the PdA's electoral demise. This in effect meant taking the place of his old friend Carlo Levi who had been editor-in-chief at L'Italia libera during 1945/46. Publication of L'Italia socialista ceased in 1949, and Garòsci found he was able to support himself as a freelance journalist-commentator specialising in politics and international affairs.

By the early 1950s he had become an extremely prolific commentator, with more or less stable links to dozens of Italian and foreign newspapers. Those to which he contributed most frequently included Comunità, a monthly magazine that presented itself as a mouth-piece for Adriano Olivetti's so-called Community Movement (Movimento Comunità; MC) He found a wider readership with his contributions to the weekly political magazine Il Mondo, for which he provided the 'XX secolo' international affairs column between 1956 and 1966. Also worthy of mention are the reviews Garòsci published in the weekly L'Espresso journal during its early years, and the press reviews and other insightful commentary pieces which he contributed for RAI to the "Third Radio Programme" (as Radio 3 was then known) for nearly twenty years, starting in 1950.

== Historian ==
Many of Garòsci's best known works of history date from the first two decades after World War II. They were often the result of deeper interrogation of and research into themes that he had previously ventilated in articles published in mainstream political magazines. An early example was Storia dei fuorusciti ("History of the exiles"), published in 1953, which originated as an essay printed in 1950 in Il Mondo. Another of his more popular books was Gli intellettuali e la guerra di Spagna ("The Intellectuals and the Spanish War"), published in 1959, which was based on a series of his conversation-interviews broadcast on RAI Radio 3.

It could be objected that the "second hand" nature of these books, based as they were on earlier works presented the other media, somehow diminished their impact their authority. The same criticism can be made of his books San Marino. Mito e storiografia tra i libertini e il Carducci (loosely, "San Marino: Myth and Historiography between libertines and Carducci", published in 1967) and Pensiero politico e storiografia moderna ("Political thinking and modern historiography", published in 1954). But in fact there is no hint of the "scatter-gun" about Garòsci's literary output. There is, indeed, an overall coherence and homogeneity, based on an underlying respect for the Crocean historiographical approach and an constant ethical-political historica vision as the "history of the formation of a [self-]awareness" ("storia del formarsi di una coscienza"), of the "maturation and evolution of aspirational ideals" ("...maturare ed evolvere dei fattori ideali").

This focus on political aspiration and ideals confers on Garòsci's published output a singular unity of methodology, but it concentrates almost exclusively on the textual output of political and cultural elites, and it sets the author apart from mainstream historical method. There is a tendency to bring everything back to a framework of a Crocean vision of liberty. The approach gives rise to a significant ability to contextualise and interpret the phenomena studied within long-term trends extending over a much longer time-frame than is commonly contemplated in print by social historians. But there is also a corresponding risk of devising over-riding teleological representations that simply disregard or crush modes of thought and classification considered as conventional among his late twentieth century readership.

In addition, where it is not hostile to the disciplines of Economics and the Social Sciences, Garòsci's historiography is indifferent to them, which clearly places him firmly outside contemporary trends in the study of history: that constrained his success as an historian. But it was nevertheless enough to earn him a professorial teaching chair in 1961, albeit not - as he might have expected - in Contemporary History. Between 1961 and 1974 Garòsci taught the more traditional (and among students ever-popular) subject of Risorgimento History at the University of Turin, before moving on to teach in a more rarefied historical niche at the University of Rome.

== Public impact during the 1950s and 1960s ==
His profile as a popular historian and prolific political commentator and the important role he had played in the struggle against fascism came together to make Aldo Garòsci an important figure in public dialogue during the first three decades of the Italian republic. Having originally been politicised as a Turin law student during the post-democratic aftermath of Mussolini's March on Rome in 1922, Garòsci never moved away from a conception of political reality predicated on a deep and intricate inter-relationship between intellectual activity and political activism across society. He applied this insight in a range of situations and contexts, while generally remaining outside (though not ignoring) organised party politics.

Garòsci's strong backing for the initially Milan-based European Federalist Movement (EFM) was probably intensified by his own experiences of war in Spain, France and Italy. He backed the movement at its launch in 1943 and he remained a supporter, without interruption, until his death more than half a century later. He was enthusiastic over the "begin with the west" line propounded by Altiero Spinelli, whereby European unification might be achieved first between the liberal democracies at the western end of the "old continent" and then extended progressively across central and eastern Europe, while preserving the important western tradition of liberalism and democracy. It is fair to add that the scope of this federalist ambition was met with studied indifference or considerable alarm among all but a small minority of EFM members.

During the 1950s Garòsci served as a member of the EFM ruling committee, although his role was evidently a largely passive one. He was very much more active, at least during the later 1950s and early 1960s, in his support of Spanish anti-Francoists, both those in exile and those involved in the dangerous business of opposition inside Spain. He was a leading member of the "Italian Committee for the freedom of the Spanish People" ("Comitato italiano per la libertà del popolo spagnolo"). In those early years, the Italian communists played an important role in the organisation. After the split with them the organisation was reconstituted as the "Italian Committee for a Democratic Spain" ("Comitato italiano per la Spagna democratica"), thereby drawing attention to the implicitly anti-democratic threat represented by the Italian Communist Party, which at that time was believed to be strongly influenced from Moscow. These anti-Francoist entities were relatively short-lived and very loosely organised, which makes it hard to determine with much clarity how much they did or how effective it was. There was an intense acceptance of the need to raise international awareness, at a time when the Spanish government had been remarkably successful in isolating Spain politically and economically from the rest of Europe. Conferences were organised, signatures were collected and appeals were launched, all designed to provide material support for internal opponents of the larger of the two Iberian dictatorships.

Garòsci's support for antifascism in Spain represented a form of loyalty to his own past, based on his involvement in the Spanish Civil War. His involvement with Israel, as a founder member in 1960 of the Italy-Israel Association, was based on more recent and ongoing connections, although he had been made aware of the urgent perils of antisemitism by the 1938 Race Laws. More recently the issues had become personal through his partnership with Irene Nunberg, whom he married at some point between 1945 and 1957. He was an enthusiastic admirer of the "Jewish homeland", albeit - at least when it came to the actual state of Israel, from a resolutely secular perspective. The project was based on political idealism: he professed total indifference to religious aspects. True to his wider approach to history, he differentiated completely between the secular and religious perspectives and resolutely implicitly refuted or overlooked any idea that there might exist some overlap between the two. In the eyes of Aldo Garòsci, the State of Israel represented one of the most successful attempts to date to construct a version of socialism that was both autonomous and democratic. (This assessment was widely shared by large swathes of the non-communist political left across Europe until the advent of the Six-Day War in 1967.)

But, echoing an awareness that probably dated back to the political convictions of his own youth, he was also conscious of some of the moral tensions involved in the realisation of ideals of liberation and liberty. He worked closely with his wife in the international campaign for Jews in the Soviet Union to be permitted to emigrate to Israel, operating initially in close dialogue with the Italian communists and then, from the later 1960s, in bitter opposition to them. The identification and bond with the Jewish state ran deeper, however. Aldo and Irene visited Israel several times, and numbered among their friends formerly Italian Jews who had decided to build new lives as Israeli citizens Back in Italy they became a point of contact for large sectors of the Jewish community. This arguably idealised attitude to the State of Israel endured at least until June 1982, when it was badly shaken by the invasion of Lebanon.

== Final years and intensifying anti-communism ==
During the later 1960s Aldo Garòsci withdrew progressively from much of his public activism. He nevertheless emerged in 1966 to promote a manifesto of intellectuals in favour of political unification among socialist parties. That year he joined the more broadly based Unified Socialist Party (Partito Socialista Unificato; PSU), a merger of the PSDI and PSI, which subsequently separated again following disappointing results at the 1968 general election. Garosci returned to the PSDI, and in 1969 became editorial director at L'Umanità, the party's daily newspaper. Changes in the political composition of the paper's management team forced his resignation in 1972.

Since the 1920s Garòsci had made no secret of his misgivings concerning the democratic and liberal credentials of the Italian Communist Party. The 1968 student protests, to which he was always hostile, triggered a hardening of his approach. Stalinist developments in tyranny, most of which he had experienced from the distanced perspective of exile in Paris and then New York, had triggered incomprehension and mistrust across the political left in western Europe as knowledge of the purges and the camps had seeped across to the west. The clandestine elements of the Hitler-Stalin non-aggression pact of 1939 became apparent only slowly, but there could be nothing clandestine about the Soviet take-over in central Europe after 1945. Elsewhere in western Europe, notably in West Germany, such awareness served to marginalise communism, but the PCI continued to win between 20% and 34% of the popular vote in general elections through the 1960s, '70s and '80s. Throughout the period, disagreement and unclarity persisted over the extent to which the PCI should be viewed as no more than a shameless proxy for still unfulfilled Soviet imperial ambitions, and how far it should be applauded for the relative efficiency and absence of flagrant corruption evident in many non-communist controlled municipal councils. During the 1970s Garòsci emerged as an uncompromising battling anti-communist, lining up with liberal-conservative elements in the process. His contributions began to appear in Indro Montanelli's Il Giornale. More rarely he even lined up with Edgardo Sogno's "difesa democratica", which a decade or two earlier he would surely have condemned as "monarchist". By the 1980s, anti-communism had become the focus of his public agenda.

Aldo Garòsci died in Rome on 3 January 2000 at the age of 92, having progressively withdrawn from the various commitments to which he would, as a younger man, have devoted his energies. It was, in the words of one source, "a long old-age".
