= Mario Zagari =

Italian politician (1913–1996)

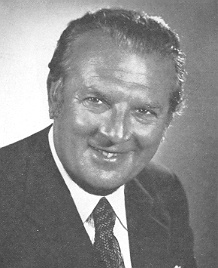

Minister of Justice
- In office 7 July 1973 – 23 November 1974
- Prime Minister: Mariano Rumor
- Preceded by: Guido Gonella
- Succeeded by: Oronzo Reale

Member of the European Parliament
- In office 17 July 1979 – 24 July 1989
- Constituency: Central Italy

Member of the Chamber of Deputies
- In office 16 May 1963 – 19 June 1979
- Constituency: Rome
- In office 8 May 1948 – 24 June 1953
- Constituency: Rome

Member of the Constituent Assembly
- In office 25 June 1946 – 31 January 1948
- Constituency: Rome

Personal details
- Born: 14 September 1913 Milan, Kingdom of Italy
- Died: 29 February 1996 (aged 82) Rome, Italy
- Resting place: Protestant Cemetery, Rome
- Party: PSI (1943–1947; 1959–1994); PSDI (1947–1949; 1951–1958); PSU (1949–1951); FL (1994–1996)
- Education: University of Milan

Mario Zagari (14 September 1913 – 29 February 1996) was an Italian socialist politician.

== Early life and education ==
Zagari was born in Milan on 14 September 1913. He held a law degree, which he received from the University of Milan. He attended courses of political economy at the University of Berlin.

During World War II, Zagari was an anti-Nazi resistance militant.

== Career ==
After the war Zagari began his political activity. He was initially leader of an anti-Stalinist group called Iniziativa Socialista, which in 1947 left the Italian Socialist Party (PSI) as part of a right-wing breakaway led by Giuseppe Saragat. Two years later Zagari abandoned Saragat to help form the Unitary Socialist Party (PSU) with Giuseppe Romita, which then subsequently merged with the Saragat faction to form the Italian Democratic Socialist Party (PSDI) in 1951. Still restless, Zagari left the PSDI seven years later and returned once more to the PSI.

In the late 1960s, Zagari was part of the right-wing group in the party, the autonomisti, together with Pietro Nenni and Giovanni Pieraccini. He served as the undersecretary at the ministry of foreign affairs for three times (specifically, from 23 February 1966 to 5 June 1968, from 22 July 1964 to 21 January 1966 and from 12 December 1968 to 5 July 1969).

In 1970 Zagari served as the minister of foreign trade in the cabinet of Mariano Rumor and led the first Italian commercial delegation to China in 1971. He was the justice minister from 7 July 1973 to 23 November 1974. Then he became one of twelve vice presidents of the European Parliament on 27 October 1976 and held the post until 18 January 1982. He was part of the socialist group in the parliament. He ran for the presidency of the parliament in the elections held in July 1979, but lost the election. In addition, he served at different commissions and delegations of the parliament from 14 March 1978 to 24 July 1989.

=== Controversy ===
After leaving office as justice minister Zagari was charged with abusing official acts, and making them public. The inquiry committee of the parliament, whose twenty members had been selected in proportion to the membership of the parties, rejected the case with a majority vote.

== Death and legacy ==
Zagari died in Rome on 29 February 1996. He was buried in the Protestant Cemetery in Rome. On the tenth anniversary of his death a book by him and Giuseppe Muzzi was republished in 2006.

== Electoral history ==
Election	House	Constituency	Party	Votes	Result
1946	Constituent Assembly	Rome–Viterbo–Latina–Frosinone	PSIUP	5,525	Elected
1948	Chamber of Deputies	Rome–Viterbo–Latina–Frosinone	US	6,074	Elected
1953	Chamber of Deputies	Rome–Viterbo–Latina–Frosinone	PSDI	7,811	Not elected
1958	Chamber of Deputies	Rome–Viterbo–Latina–Frosinone	PSDI	8,142	Not elected
1963	Chamber of Deputies	Rome–Viterbo–Latina–Frosinone	PSI	17,787	Elected
1968	Chamber of Deputies	Rome–Viterbo–Latina–Frosinone	PSI	28,485	Elected
1972	Chamber of Deputies	Rome–Viterbo–Latina–Frosinone	PSI	36,080	Elected
1976	Chamber of Deputies	Rome–Viterbo–Latina–Frosinone	PSI	29,215	Elected
1979	European Parliament	Central Italy	PSI	152,002	Elected
1984	European Parliament	Central Italy	PSI	70,926	Elected
1989	European Parliament	Central Italy	PSI	16,328	Not elected
