= Independent Socialist Union =

Former political party in Italy

Independent Socialist Union Unione Socialista Indipendente
- Leader: Valdo Magnani
- Founded: 29 March 1953
- Dissolved: 24 March 1957
- Merged into: Italian Socialist Party
- Headquarters: Milan, Italy
- Newspaper: Risorgimento Socialista
- Ideology: Democratic socialism
- Political position: Left-wing

The Independent Socialist Union (Italian: Unione Socialista Indipendente, USI), was a political party active in Italy in the 1950s.

Founded in March 1953 by Valdo Magnani and Aldo Cucchi, two members of Italian Parliament expelled from the Italian Communist Party (PCI) in 1951 for criticisms on the links between the PCI and the Soviet Union, the USI was an attempt to unite non-communist and non-social democratic elements of the left.

The party failed to secure any seats in the 1953 Italian general election and subsequently dissolved in 1957 with members joining the Italian Socialist Party and the Italian Democratic Socialist Party.

== History ==
In 1951 the communist MPs Valdo Magnani and Aldo Cucchi, two PCI members of the Italian parliament, had been critical of their party's political subordination to the Soviet Union. On 25 January 1951 they sought to resign from the party, but this was rejected and they were expelled. Both were subjected to a campaign of insults and accusations by the PCI and the Italian Socialist Party (a "unity of action" pact existed between the two), accused of being traitors, accomplices and servants of US intelligence services, efforts were also made to isolate them from friends and relatives.

Magnani thus founded the Italian Workers' Movement (Italian: Movimento Lavoratori Italiani, MLI), of which assumed the office of secretary; also in the same period he founded the magazine "Risorgimento Socialista", which will collaborate with personalities such as Ignazio Silone, Giuliano Pischel, Mario Giovana and Lucio Libertini.

The MLI was financially supported by Yugoslavia and had about 2,000 members, but in the local elections of 1952, it collected just 30,000 votes. Noting the difficulty of breaking through the electorate of the PCI and the PSI, in March 1953 the MLI decided to merge together with the Social Christian Party led by Gerardo Bruni and other autonomist socialist and social democratic groups into the Independent Socialist Union (USI).

In the general election of 7 June 1953 the party obtained about 225,000 votes in the Chamber of Deputies (0.8% of the vote), without obtaining seats.

However, USI, together with the National Democratic Alliance and Popular Unity, proved decisive in not triggering the majority prize provided for by the "fraud law" (the new electoral law wanted by Alcide De Gasperi), which ended up causing a crisis of centrism.

The international effects of the 1956 Hungarian Revolution brought about the end of the alliance between the PCI and the PSI, and with the PSI's political realignment most of the ideological reasons which were the roots of support for the USI were overcome. In 1957, the second and last congress of the USI declared the dissolution of the party. Some of the leading members (Magnani included) joined the Central Committee of the Italian Socialist Party. Others instead followed Cucchi into the Italian Democratic Socialist Party.

== Election results ==
=== Chamber of Deputies ===
Election	Votes	%	Seats	+/−	Leader
1953	225,409	0.8	0 / 590	–	Valdo Magnani
