= Tristano Codignola =

Italian politician (1913–1981)

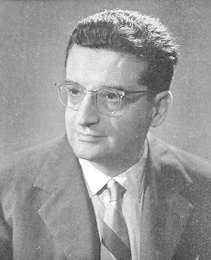
Tristano Codignola

Tristano Codignola (Italian pronunciation: [trisˈtaːno kodiɲˈɲɔːla]; 23 October 1913 in Assisi – 12 December 1981 in Bologna) was an Italian politician.

== Biography ==
Son of Ernesto Codignola, pedagogist and manager of the Florentine publishing house La Nuova Italia, and Anna Maria Melli, Tristano Codignola was born in Assisi in 1913. After graduating in law in 1935, he devoted himself a lot to the company inherited from his father of which he was first director (1936) and managing director then (1945); in January 1942 he was arrested for activities against the fascist regime and in June was sentenced to political confinement in the prison of Florence and then of Lanciano, from where however he left in November thanks to an amnesty, even if supervised by the OVRA. He was a prominent exponent of liberal socialism and therefore among the founders of the Action Party (which brought together associations such as Justice and Freedom), formed in 1943 by politicians who like him had fought Nazifascism, and of which he was the representative during the Italian civil war, actively participating in the Florentine Resistance. Following the killing of Giovanni Gentile, while not sparing severe criticism of the figure of the philosopher and his adhesion to the Italian Social Republic, he took a tough position against the authors of the attack on the illegal paper La Libertà of 30 April 1944.

Immediately after the end of the Second World War, Codignola continued his experience in the Action Party, on whose lists he was elected deputy to the Constituent Assembly in 1946. In the election of 1948 he was candidate on the Socialist Unity list but was not elected.

In December 1949 Codignola joined the split of June of that year from the Italian Socialist Party (PSI) led by Giuseppe Romita and called "Socialist Unification Movement", which merged with some politicians who left the Socialist Party of Italian Workers (PSLI), into the Unitary Socialist Party (PSU); this one in turn in the 1951 merged with the same PSLI, that was renamed "Socialist Party (Italian Section of the Socialist International)". The PS(SIIS) changed its name again in 1952 to Italian Democratic Socialist Party (PSDI). Giuseppe Saragat, at the PSDI congress of 1951, being closer to the Christian Democrats, managed to impose his own line and in December 1952 Codignola was expelled from the party for his opposition to the so-called "Scam law" (legge truffa); for this reason, in February the following year, he gave birth to Socialist Autonomy, that joined the Popular Unity movement, of which he became secretary. In the 1953 general election UP obtained only the 0.6% of the vote and Codignola was not elected this time either, but the votes to this party, combined with those of the National Democratic Alliance, were sufficient to prevent the government coalition from reaching the quorum to obtain the majority prize.

In 1957 he joined other socialist politicians in the PSI, of which he became responsible for public education of the party, a position he held until the 1976 congress. In 1981 he was expelled from the PSI for having signed a highly critical manifesto against the secretary Bettino Craxi and the leadership of the PSI; together with the other expelled politicians he founded the "League of Socialists". However, he died at the end of that same year, during a conference of the neo-movement in Bologna.
