= Partito Socialista Unitario =

Partito Socialista Unitario may refer to:

- Unitary Socialist Party (Italy, 1922) (1922–1930), a political party in Italy
- Unitary Socialist Party (Italy, 1949) (1949–1951), a political party in Italy
- The denomination assumed by the Italian Democratic Socialist Party from 1969 to 1971
