= Militant Christianity =

Militant Christianity may refer to:

- Christian fundamentalism, a Christian movement often described as having militant attitude
- The Church Militant, Christians who struggle as 'soldiers of Christ'
- The crusader movement, a militant Christian movement inspired by the First Crusade

== See also ==
- Christianity and violence
- Militant Christian Party, political party in Italy
- Militant Christian Patriots, British anti-Semitic organisation
- Miles Christianus, Christian allegory based on New Testament military metaphors
