= Tempo Presente =

Political magazine in Italy (1956–1967)

- Editor: Ignazio Silone; Nicola Chiaromonte
- Categories: Political magazine
- Frequency: Monthly
- Publisher: Italian Association for Cultural Freedom
- Founded: 1956
- First issue: April 1956
- Final issue: 1967
- Country: Italy
- Based in: Rome
- Language: Italian

Tempo Presente (Italian: Present Time) was a monthly political magazine which existed between 1956 and 1967 in Rome, Italy. It was supported by the Congress for Cultural Freedom which published other magazines, including Cuadernos, Encounter, Survey and Der Monat.

== History and profile ==
Tempo Presente was established in 1956 and published monthly in Rome by the Italian Association for Cultural Freedom. The Association was the Italian division of the Congress for Cultural Freedom. The first issue of Tempo Presente appeared in April 1956 and declared that Tempo Presente was an international magazine.

Its editors were Ignazio Silone and Nicola Chiaromonte. The magazine featured articles published in other Congress magazines, including Cuadernos, Encounter, Der Monat and Preuves. They all covered significant cultural and political events which were used to show the superiority of Western-style democracy over other alternatives of government. However, each of these magazines had their own specific political stance mostly depending on the editors, and Tempo Presente adopted a left-wing approach. Another distinctive feature of the magazine in contrast to other Congress magazines was its attempt to modify the transnational dimension of the cultural Cold War to local conditions of Italy.

The major contributors of the monthly were leftist writers who did not support Communism: Italo Calvino, Vasco Pratolini, Libero de Libero, Albert Camus, Alberto Moravia, Leonardo Sciascia, Enzo Forcella, Nelo Risi, Elsa Morante, Altiero Spinelli, Giulio Guderzo, Giuliano Piccoli and Luciano Codignola. Some well-known international writers also contributed to Tempo Presente, including Dwight Macdonald, Hannah Arendt, Melvin J. Lasky, Richard Löwenthal, Mary McCarty, Daniel Bell, Lewis A. Coser, Joseph Buttinger, Michael Harrington, Irving Howe and Theodore Draper. In 1961 Tempo Presente featured a short story of the Yugoslav dissident writer Milovan Djilas entitled The War which led to its ban in Yugoslavia.

Tempo Presente could not develop close relations with other Italian publications which led to its isolation in the Italian political and cultural arena. The magazine experienced frequent conflicts with the leading periodicals of the period such as Il Ponte, Il Mulino and Il Mondo. Tempo Presente folded in 1967 due to the low levels of circulation.
