= Severina (Silone) =

First edition (publ. Mondadori)

Severina, or La speranza di suor Severina, is the last work of Italian writer Ignazio Silone, published posthumously in 1981.

Silone began writing Severina in 1977 but died the following year before completing it. His widow, Darina, edited and finished the novella based on Silone's notes. Severina was a bestseller in Italy.
