= Antonicelli =

Antonicelli is an Italian surname. Notable people with the surname include:

- Franco Antonicelli (1902–1974), Italian author, poet, publisher, essayist and anti-fascist activist
- Giuseppe Antonicelli (1897–1980), Italian conductor
