= Darina Laracy =

Irish journalist and writer (1917–2003)

- Born: 30 March 1917; Rathgar, County Dublin, Ireland
- Died: 25 July 2003 (aged 86); Rome, Italy
- Occupations: Anti-fascist, writer
- Writing career
- Pen name: Darina Laracy Silone

Elisabeth Darina Laracy Silone (30 March 1917 – 25 July 2003) was an Irish journalist, translator, and anti-fascist. She was the wife of the writer Ignazio Silone from 1944 until his death in 1978.

== Life ==
Born in Rathgar, Dublin, Laracy had three sisters: Cecily, Moira, and Eithne. She graduated in 1937 in history and political science from University College Dublin. By 1939, Laracy had an MA. She went to France, where she had a scholarship to study for her doctorate at the Sorbonne. In 1940, she moved to Italy, visiting Milan briefly and then settling in Rome, where she worked as a correspondent for the Herald Tribune and the International News Service. This brought her attention from the Italian fascist regime, which wanted her to collaborate with them. When she refused, she was forced to flee to Switzerland.

Laracy was initially based in Bern, where she gave a full account to the chief intelligence officer. Her visa was for 15 days and eventually she could not get a further extension. She moved to Zurich when an English publisher commissioned her to write a book on the situation in Italy. It was in the libraries there that she met Ignazio Silone, who was also in exile. She convinced Silone to let her assist him in his work against Fascist Italy and they returned to Rome in October 1944. They were married two months later. Capable of speaking six languages, Laracy worked on the translations of his works and after his death she used his notes to complete the unfinished novel Severina.
