= Rosso e Nero =

Weekly political magazine in Italy (1946–1948)

- Categories: Political magazine
- Frequency: Weekly
- Founder: Alberto Giovannini
- Founded: November 1946
- Final issue: 1948
- Country: Italy
- Based in: Rome
- Language: Italian

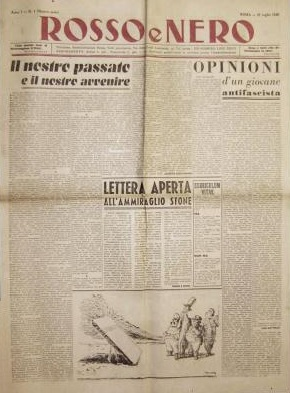
Rosso e Nero (Red and Black), magazine

Rosso e Nero (Italian: Red and Black) was a weekly political magazine that was published between 1946 and 1948 in Rome, Italy. The magazine is known for its founder and editor Alberto Giovannini.

== History and profile ==
Rosso e Nero was established in November 1946. Its founder and editor was the Italian journalist Alberto Giovannini who had edited a publication of the University Fascist Group during the Fascist period. It was headquartered in Rome and came out weekly. The magazine featured Giovannini's articles on his political views and his project of reconciling the experience of the former Fascists with the political lines of the socialists. Ignazio Silone and Ugo Zatterin were among the contributors of the magazine.

Rosso e Nero did not manage to have higher readership and circulation and was eventually closed in 1948.
