= 1942 Keighley by-election =

UK Parliamentary by-election

The 1942 Keighley by-election was held on 13 February 1942. The by-election was held due to the death of the incumbent Labour MP, Hastings Lees-Smith. It was won (unopposed) by the Labour candidate Ivor Thomas.
