= Luca's Secret =

1956 novel by Ignazio Silone

First UK edition (publ. Jonathan Cape, 1959)

Luca's Secret (Italian: Il Segreto di Luca) is a 1956 romance novel by Ignazio Silone. The romance is set in Marsica, Abruzzo. The novel is about an innocent person who is sent to prison but is unwilling to prove his innocence in order to keep his secret.
