= Il Ponte =

Political and literary magazine in Italy

- Former editors: Piero Calamandrei
- Categories: Political magazine; Literary magazine
- Frequency: Monthly; Bimonthly
- Founder: Piero Calamandrei
- Founded: 1945
- First issue: April 1945
- Country: Italy
- Based in: Florence; Milan
- Language: Italian
- Website: Il Ponte
- ISSN: 0032-423X
- OCLC: 1641093

Il Ponte (Italian: The Bridge) is a political and literary magazine in Milan, Italy, which has been in circulation since April 1945.

== History and profile ==
Il Ponte was started by Piero Calamandrei in Florence in April 1945. Calamandrei also edited the magazine until his death in 1956. The original subtitle of the magazine was Rivista mensile diretta da Piero Calamandrei (Italian: Monthly magazine directed by Piero Calamandrei). Later, its subtitle was redesigned as Rivista mensile di politica e letteratura (Italian: Monthly political and literary magazine). Le Monnier was the first publisher of the magazine. In its initial period it mostly covered articles on history, politics and science, and literary content was relatively infrequent.

Il Ponte came out monthly between its start in 1945 and 1989. It has been published on a bimonthly basis since then. Its headquarters moved from Florence to Milan.

From May to August 1946 Il Ponte featured articles by Umberto Zanotti Bianco about his stay in Africo, a small village near the Aspromonte, in December 1928. The magazine published an article on the views of the Italian educator and activist Augusto Monti in 1949. Antonio Spinosa was one of Il Ponte's contributors and analyzed the anti-Semitic content of the Italian fascism in his articles in 1951 and in 1952. Leo Valiani edited the special issue of Il Ponte on Yugoslavia in 1955. The 1955 visit of Piero Calamandrei and other Italian intellectuals to China was featured in a special issue of the magazine in 1956.

Il Ponte experienced frequent conflicts with Tempo Presente which was published by the Italian Association for Cultural Freedom between 1956 and 1967.
