= Ignazio Silone =

Italian politician and writer (1900–1978)

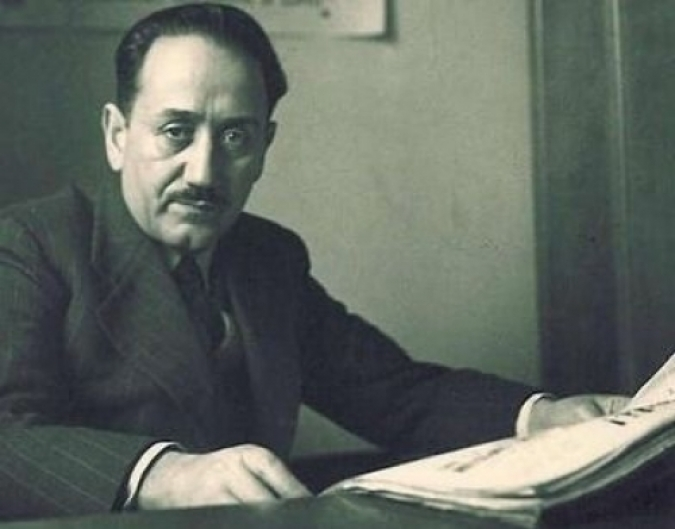
- Silone as a PSIUP leader, 1946–47

Member of the Constituent Assembly
- In office 25 June 1946 – 31 January 1948
- Constituency: L'Aquila

Personal details
- Born: Secondino Tranquilli; 1 May 1900 Pescina dei Marsi, Kingdom of Italy
- Died: 22 August 1978 (aged 78) Geneva, Switzerland
- Party: PSI (1917–1921; 1930–1947); PCd'I (1921–1930); UdS (1948–1949); PSU (1949–1951); PSDI (1951–1954)
- Occupation: Author, politician

Secondino Tranquilli (1 May 1900 – 22 August 1978), best known by the pseudonym Ignazio Silone (/sɪˈloʊni/ sil-OH-nee, Italian: [iɲˈɲattsjo siˈloːne]), was an Italian politician and writer. He became famous during World War II for his anti-fascist novels. Considered among the most well-known and read Italian intellectuals in Europe and in the world, his most famous novel, Fontamara, became emblematic for its denunciation of the condition of poverty, injustice, and social oppression of the lower classes, and has been translated into numerous languages. From 1946 to the 1970s, he was nominated for the Nobel Prize in Literature at least 13 times.

For many years an anti-fascist exile abroad, Silone participated actively and in various phases of Italian politics, animating the cultural life of the country in the post-war period. He was among the founders of the Italy's Communist party in 1921; he was later expelled for his dissidence with the Stalinist party line, and moved to democratic socialist positions. The break with the Italian Communist Party in the years after World War II led him to be often opposed by Italian critics and rehabilitated belatedly despite a controversy about his relations with the Italian fascist secret police, while for all his career he was particularly appreciated abroad.

== Early life and education ==
Silone was born on 1 May 1900, in a rural family, in the town of Pescina, near L'Aquila, in the Abruzzo region. His father, Paolo Tranquilli, died in 1911, and he lost many of his family members, including his mother, Marianna Delli Quadri, in the 1915 Avezzano earthquake. He left his hometown and finished high school.

== Career ==
=== From the PSI to the PCd'I ===
In 1917, Silone joined the Young Socialists group of the Italian Socialist Party (Partito Socialista Italiano, PSI), rising to be their leader. In October 1920, while in Rome, he met Alfonso Leonetti, another socialist Meridionalist, with whom Silone would share, among other things, his opposition to Stalinism. Silone was a founding member of the breakaway Communist Party of Italy (Partito Comunista d'Italia, PCd'I) in 1921 and became one of its covert leaders during the Italian fascist regime. His brother, Romolo Tranquilli, was arrested in 1928 for being a member of the PCd'I and died in prison in 1931 as a result of the severe beatings he received.

=== Opposition to Stalinism, return to the PSI, and breakaway socialist activity ===
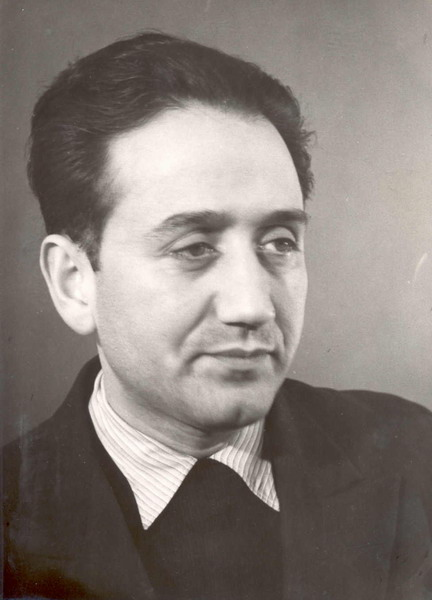
Silone in the 1920s

Silone left Italy in 1927 on a mission to the Soviet Union and settled in Switzerland in 1930. While there, he declared his opposition to Joseph Stalin and the leadership of Comintern; consequently, he was expelled from the PCd'I, and returned to the PSI. He suffered from tuberculosis and severe clinical depression and spent nearly a year in Swiss clinics; in Switzerland, Aline Valangin helped and played host to him and other migrants. As he recovered, Silone began writing his first novel, Fontamara, published in German translation in 1933. The English edition, first published by Penguin Books in September 1934, went through frequent reprintings during the 1930s, with the events of the Spanish Civil War and the escalation towards the outbreak of World War II increasing attention for its subject material.

In the course of World War II, Silone became the leader of a clandestine socialist organization operating from Switzerland to support Italian resistance groups in Nazi Germany-occupied Northern Italy (Italian Social Republic). He also became an Office of Strategic Services (OSS) agent under the pseudonym of Len. The United States Army printed unauthorized versions of Fontamara and Bread and Wine and distributed them to the Italians during the liberation of Italy after 1943. These two books together with The Seed Beneath the Snow form the Abruzzo Trilogy. Silone returned to Italy only in 1944, and two years later he was elected as a PSI deputy. In 1946, he became a contributor to Rosso e Nero, a magazine started and edited by Alberto Giovannini.

In 1948, Silone was a founder of the breakaway Union of Socialists (Unione dei Socialisti, UdS), succeeding Ivan Matteo Lombardo as the party's leader in June 1949. In December 1949, the UdS was dissolved, and its members (including Silone) joined the Unitary Socialist Party (Partito Socialista Unitario, PSU). In 1951, the PSU merged with Giuseppe Saragat's Italian Socialist Workers' Party (Partito Socialista dei Lavoratori Italiani, PSLI) to form the Italian Democratic Socialist Party (Partito Socialista Democratico Italiano, PSDI). Saragat encouraged Silone to stand for the Senate on the PSDI list in the 1953 Italian general election. As the experience was a failure, he spurned any active participation in Italian politics from then on.

=== Later writing and awards ===
Following his contribution to the anti-communist anthology The God That Failed (1949), Silone joined the Congress for Cultural Freedom and edited Tempo Presente together with Nicola Chiaromonte. In its first issue, Silone criticized political ideologies for being reduced "to the prerogative of reason of state or of party reason". In 1967, with the discovery that the journal received secret funds from the United States Central Intelligence Agency, Silone resigned and devoted all his energies to writing novels and autobiographical essays. In 1969, Silone was awarded the Jerusalem Prize, which goes to writers who deal with the theme of individual freedom and society. In 1971, he was awarded the prestigious Prix mondial Cino Del Duca.

== Legacy ==
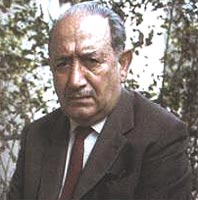
Silone in his last years

In Italy, Silone was often opposed by its critics, particularly after his break with the PCI and the post-war years, but was more appreciated abroad; for example, Silone was enjoyed by the likes of Heinrich Böll, Albert Camus, and Thomas Mann while critics, such as Carlo Salinari in L'Unità, defined him as a "renegade" and a "failure". His reputation in Italy improved mainly after his death. In the words of Marco Malvestuto, Silone was "opposed by his former party colleagues, often misunderstood, and never well enough known". Outside of Italy, he became world-famous for his powerful anti-fascist novels. According to Malvestuto, "Ignazio Silone is best known for his literary production and his narrative novels epics of the Marsican 'bosses'. Less known is the political thinker Silone, whose contribution, perhaps underestimated by official historiography, brings us into contact with an intellectual who is in some ways original, capable of combining political commitment and critical ability; faith towards humanity and scepticism towards institutions and ideologies; trust in social justice and openness to forms of social coexistence inspired by liberal-federalist models." Politically, Silone, one of the founders of Italy's Communist party, wanted to go beyond orthodox communism through federalism and liberal socialism, had a diatribe with the long-time PCI leader Palmiro Togliatti, spoke of the weakness of democratic institutions, and his meetings with Carlo Rosselli and Giustizia e Libertà members led him to rethink socialism away from Marxism–Leninism. Silone defined himself as a "Christian without church and socialist without party", and is considered the archetypical Italian anti-fascist.

In the 1990s, Italian historians Dario Biocca and Mauro Canali found documents that implied that Silone had acted as an informant for the Fascist police from 1919 until 1930. It is believed that the reason he broke from the Italian fascist secret police OVRA is that they tortured his brother. The two historians published the results of their research in a work titled L'informatore. Silone, i comunisti e la polizia, which attracted significant attention, as well as controversy and criticism. In 2003, Elizabeth Leake put forward the thesis, based on the work of Biocca and Canali, that Silone would have invented his own image, his identity, and life, accusing him of having been a false-socialist spy for the police and then a false-communist spy for the fascists. In her work, Leake does not accept the thesis according to which Silone, who repented after having acted as a fascist spy within the Communist party, redeemed himself through anti-fascist literary works, and goes further; according to Leake, Silone had always been a traitor after the breakdown of the relationship with the fascist police commissioner Ernesto Belloni, an event that according to Leake "represented, for Silone, the event more significant and dramatic than his expulsion from the Italian Communist Party in 1931 or the death of his brother in 1932". According to Leake, he decided to reinvent his identity by creating a fictitious Silone through literary works, with which to sanctify and exalt himself, and "with Romolo dead, there was no one left to corroborate or to contradict Silone's stories." Critics of her thesis, such as Maria Moscardelli, negatively summarized Leake's thesis as arguing that Silone would be the 20th-century political equivalent of Alessandro Cagliostro. (Note: Maria Moscardelli further summarized Elizabeth Leake's thesis thusly: "Proceeding with virtuosity, through a psychoanalytic exercise, Leake builds piece by piece a sort of Silone-Frankestein with the following peculiarities (of Silone, obviously): hatred for the father (pages 56, 65, 66), misrecognition if not hatred for the mother (page 170), family mental defects (page 91), hereditary tuberculosis (page 67), homosexuality (page 163), suspected impotence (page 173), all seasoned with an innate propensity to betrayal (p. 35). To all this collection of deviances, add the harmful influence he had in the tragic story of his brother and the unscrupulous use of his death which proved to be a liberation from a dangerous witness ('with Romolo dead, there was no one left to corroborate or to contradict Silone's stories.') (page 30).") A 2005 biography by Biocca also included documents showing Silone's involvement with American intelligence (the OSS) during and after World War II, suggesting that Silone's political stands and extensive literary work should be reconsidered in light of a more complex personality and political engagements.

Abroad, Silone remained appreciated, and was defended by the likes of Christopher Hitchens. (Note: Writing about the controversy in The Nation, Christopher Hitchens commented: "Debating with Alexander Cockburn on the collusion of Ignazio Silone with Mussolini's secret police ('Minority Report,' June 12), I made the assumption, for the sake of argument, that the published reports of Silone's collaboration were true. They just didn't bear the construction that Cockburn put upon them. It now appears that we may both have been party, with differing degrees of relish and reluctance, to a widely and prematurely disseminated falsehood. The original book by Dario Biocca and Mauro Canali, L'Informatore: Silone, I Comunisti e la Polizia, has been witheringly attacked by the historian Mimmo Franzinelli, who is considered an expert on OVRA, the Fascist police. He accuses Biocca and Canali of misunderstanding the documentation, of simplifying and even mistranscribing the evidence, and of wrongly excluding the possibility that Silone did whatever he did under Communist Party instructions. Subsequent articles and essays in La Stampa and in Corriere della Sera, and interviews with Norberto Bobbio, among others, have begun to make a strong case that the whole charge against Silone is founded either on bad faith or on good faith mixed with mediocre scholarship. I cannot myself be confident, and I lack the necessary linguistic and historical expertise, but I now feel fairly sure that the first draft in this argument was allowed too much authority. In the circumstances, I feel that I should alert Nation readers to a possibly grave injustice and direct those who are literate in Italian to the June 2000 issue of L'Indice dei Libri del Mese, in which Franzinelli's rebuttal appears.") The original book by Biocca and Canali was strongly criticized by Mimmo Franzinelli, a historian who is considered an expert on the OVRA, as well as by the Nenni Foundation president Giuseppe Tamburrano, who saw him as "a consistently indefatigable enemy of Mussolini's regime" in contrast to Biocca and Canali's Silone as "the cleverest and most effective informer for the Fascist police". Biocca and Canali's work was also criticized by Indro Montanelli, (Note: Indro Montanelli explained: "I have always said – and I confirm – that revisionism is the raw material of historiography which, without it, would be a dead discipline. ... The case of Silone is very different, as he tries to pay for a traitor to his party and a spy for the OVRA. There are, it is said, the documents. But which documents? The OVRA documents, cut and stitched together in certain ways, and which consist of some letters written by Silone to a police commissioner who at the time of the earthquake which had destroyed Marsica, and made the two Silone boys orphans (who at that time they were called Tranquilli), he had taken them under his protection and helped them as government commissioner to continue their studies. In these letters, of an almost filial tone, as they have been reproduced, there is, not even if you look for it with a lantern, any 'revelation' on what was happening in the recesses of that clandestine and catacomb-like PCI, of whose nomenclature Silone referred part, nor the name of any 'comrade'. So what was Silone spying on and reporting? And why did he abandon the party of his own accord, if he had joined it to spy on and report what was happening there? And why did Togliatti, when, as Minister of Justice, had in his hands the lists of the OVRA and the confidences of its boss, Leto, find nothing to complain about Silone considered the apostate and renegade 'comrade'? This, dear Rocca, for me is not revisionism. It's something else. Guess what.") and in articles and essays that appeared in La Stampa and in Corriere della Sera, as well as interviews with the likes of Norberto Bobbio, among others, who argued that the accusations first put forward by Biocca and Canali against Silone were made either in bad faith or in good faith but with mediocre scholarship. Conversely, in the words of Antonio Fadda in 2015, "I don't think there is much uncertainty anymore about the relationships that Secondino Tranquilli (better known as Ignazio Silone) had with the Italian state police in the early years of the fascist regime. ... It has often been explained that Silone's collaboration with Bellomo had a humanitarian purpose. It served to obtain better conditions for his brother Romolo, a member of the party, accused of complicity in a bloody attack in Milan, arrested, and treated harshly during police interrogations. The concern for his brother's fate was real and justified. But there were probably other reasons that belong to the domain of psychology rather than that of political analysis. Silone was a complicated man, troubled by doubts, examinations of conscience, introspective analyses, feelings of guilt: qualities and virtues that would have made him a great writer, rather than a political leader."

== Personal life ==
Silone was married to Darina Laracy (1917–2003), an Irish student of Italian literature and journalist. He died in Geneva, Switzerland, in 1978.

== Works ==
=== Novels ===
- Fontamara (1930) – Fontamara, translated by Michael Wharf (1934); Gwenda David and Eric Mosbacher (1938); Harvey Fergusson II (1960).
- Un viaggio a Parigi (1934) – Mr. Aristotle, translated by Samuel Putnam (1935), short stories.
- Pane e vino (1936) – Bread and Wine, translated by Gwenda David and Eric Mosbacher (1936).
- Il seme sotto la neve (1941) – The Seed Beneath the Snow, translated by Frances Frenaye (1942).
- Una manciata di more (1952) – A Handful of Blackberries, translated by Darina Silone (1953).
- Pane e vino (revised version, 1955) – Bread and Wine, translated by Harvey Fergusson II (1962).
- Il segreto di Luca (1956) – The Secret of Luca, translated by Darina Silone (1958).
- La volpe e le camelie (1960) – The Fox and the Camelias, translated Eric Mosbacher (1961).
- Severina (1981), completed after his death by Darina Silone.
- The Abruzzo Trilogy: Fontamara, Bread and Wine, The Seed Beneath the Snow, translated by Eric Mosbacher, revised by Darina Silone (2000).

=== Essays ===
- Il fascismo. Origini e sviluppo (1934).
- La scuola dei dittatori (1938) – The School for Dictators, translated by Gwenda David and Eric Mosbacher (1939).
- Memoriale dal carcere svizzero (1942) – Memoi from a Swiss Prison, translated by Stanislao G. Pugliese (2006).
- The God that Failed (1949) – contribution.
- Uscita di sicurezza (1965) – Emergency Exit, translated by Harvey Fergusson II (1968).
- L'Avvenire dei lavoratori (1945).
- A Conversation in Paris (1955), The Anchor Review, Number One of a Series, Garden City, New York: Doubleday Anchor Books.
- Mazzini (1939) – introductory essay, translated by Arthur Livingstone, to The Living Thoughts of Mazzini Presented by Ignazio Silone (1939).

Three of Silone's poems were included by Hanns Eisler in his Deutsche Sinfonie, along with poetry by Bertolt Brecht.

=== Theatre ===
- Ed egli si nascose (1944) – And He Hid Himself: A Play in Four Acts, translated by Darina Silone (1946). (Note: Although the title page states "Translated by Darina Tranquilli", as Tranquilli was Silone's original surname, it refers to Darina Silone. As also stated by the dust jacket ("While the principal characters in this play are the same as those in Silone's Bread and Wine, this is not a dramatization of the novel"), it was not a dramatization of the novel.)
- L'avventura di un povero cristiano (1968) – The Story of a Humble Christian, translated by William Weaver (1970).

=== Cinematic versions ===
- A version of Fontamara, directed by Carlo Lizzani and starring Michele Placido, was released in 1977.

== Bibliography ==
- Giuseppe Leone, Ignazio Silone, scrittore dell'intelligenza, Firenze Atheneum, Florence, 1996, ISBN 88-7255-106-4.
- Dario Biocca, Mauro Canali, L'informatore. Silone, i comunisti e la polizia], Luni Editrice, Milan, Trento, 2000.
- Giuseppe Tamburrano, Processo a Silone, La disavventura di un povero cristiano, Lacaita Editore, Rome, 2001.
- Michael P. McDonald, Il caso Silone, The National Interest, 2001.
- Elizabeth Leake, The Reinvention of Ignazio Silone, University of Toronto Press, Toronto, 2003.
- Giuseppe Leone, Silone e Machiavelli. Una scuola... che non crea prìncipi, preface by Vittoriano Esposito, Centro Studi Ignazio Silone, Pescina, 2003.
- Maria Moscardelli, La coperta abruzzese. Il filo della vita di Ignazio Silone, Aracne, Rome, 2004.
- Mauro Canali, Le spie del regime, Il Mulino, Bologna, 2004.
- Dario Biocca, Silone. La doppia vita di un italiano, Rizzoli, Milan 2005.
- Mimmo Franzinelli, Silone in the 'Thirties'.
- Giuseppe Leone, [rec. al vol. di] Maria Moscardelli, "La coperta abruzzese. Il filo della vita di Ignazio Silone", Marsica Domani, Avezzano, 31 October 2005, p. 9.
- Giuseppe Leone, Nulla di vero nel Silone di Biocca, su Marsica Domani, Avezzano, 2005.
- Giuseppe Leone, [rec. al vol. di] Valeria Giannantonio, "La scrittura oltre la vita (Studi su Ignazio Silone)", Quaderni siloniani, 1–2/2005.
- Maria Moscardelli, Silone Reinvented, 2005.
- Stanislao G. Pugliese, Bitter Spring: A Life of Ignazio Silone, Farrar, Straus and Giroux, New York, 2009.
- Giuseppe Leone, Roberto Zambonini, "Puccini e le 'more' di Silone. Viaggio poetico-musicale fra 'soavi fanciulle' e coraggiose eroine", Malgrate (Lecco), 27 August 2009.
- Giuseppe Leone, "L'ennesimo bis del secondo 'caso' Silone. Andrea Paganini e il suo 'Ignazio Silone, l'uomo che si è salvato', Pomezia-Notizie, Rome, July 2010, pp. 10–11.
- Stefano Mercanti, Colonial Narrative and Indigenous Consciousness in Raja Rao's Kanthapura and Ignazio Silone's Fontamara, in Voice and Memory. Indigenous Imagination and Expression, edited by G. N. Devy, Geoffrey V. Davis, and K. K. Chakravarty, 2011, Orient Blackswan, Hyderabad, pp. 209–225, ISBN 978-8-1250-4222-8.
- Giuseppe Leone, "Il 'fenicottero' Silone nella revisione di Renzo Paris", Pomezia-Notizie, February 2015, pp. 10–11.
- Ignazio Silone, Il seme sotto la neve, critical edition edited by Alessandro La Monica, Mondadori Education-Le Monnier University, Milan and Florence, 2015.
- Giuseppe Leone, "La scuola dei dittatori ovvero un Machiavelli di meno", in AA.VV., "Atti del Convegno Internazionale di Studi Caen (7 February 2019) Pescina (23–24 August 2019), "Ignazio Silone o la Logica della privazione", edited by Mario Cimini and Brigitte Poitrenaud Lamesi, Rocco Carabba Editore, Lanciano, 2020, pp. 241–253.

Non-profit organization positions
Preceded by François Mauriac	International President of PEN International; 1946–1947	Succeeded by Maurice Maeterlinck
