= Ivan Matteo Lombardo =

Italian politician (1902–1980)

Ivan Matteo Lombardo OMRI, GCIH
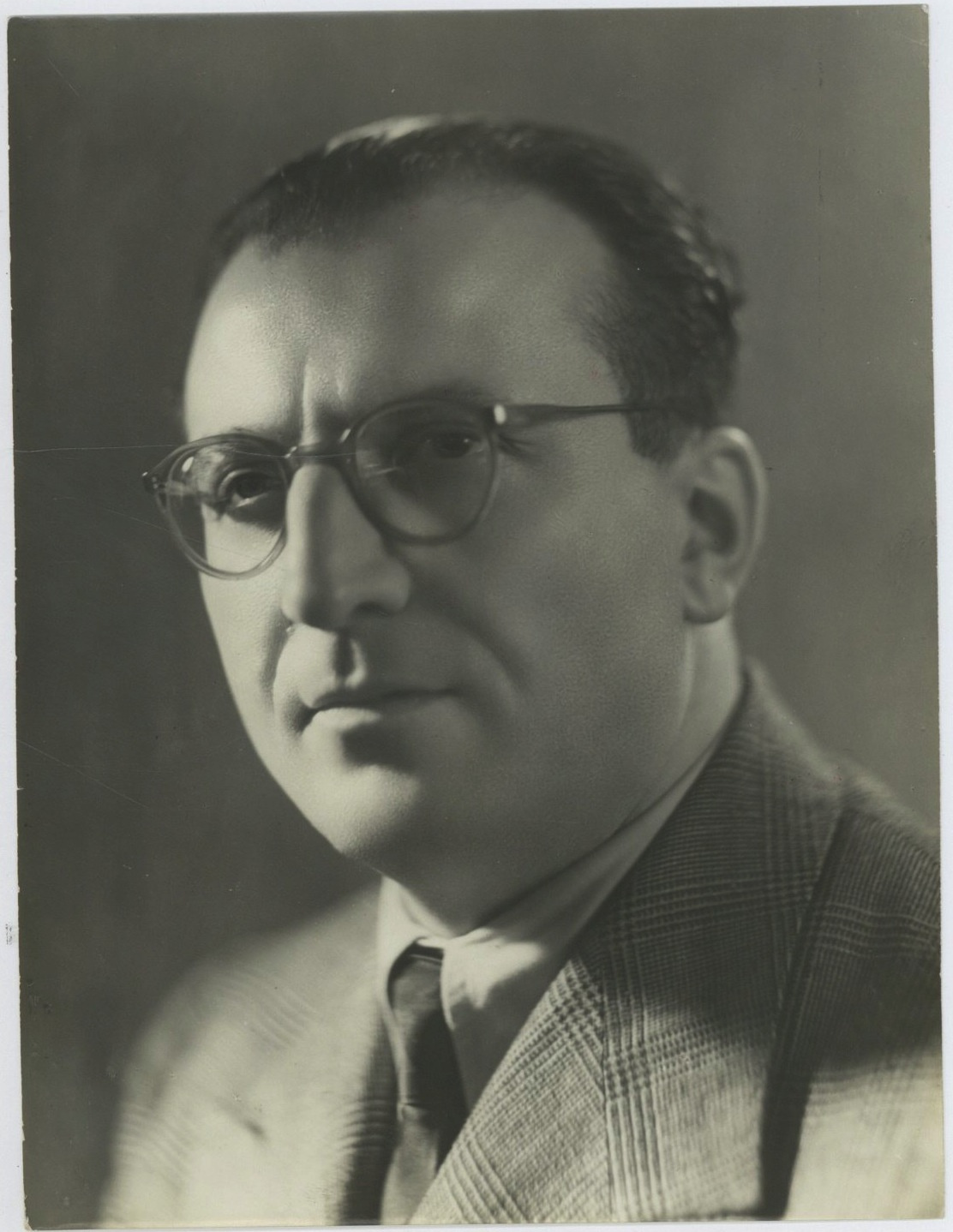
- Lombardo c. 1946

Minister of Industry and Commerce
- In office 23 May 1948 – 7 November 1949
- Prime Minister: Alcide De Gasperi
- Preceded by: Roberto Tremelloni
- Succeeded by: Giovanni Battista Bertone

Minister of Foreign Trade
- In office 27 January 1950 – 5 April 1951
- Prime Minister: Alcide De Gasperi
- Preceded by: Giovanni Battista Bertone
- Succeeded by: Ugo La Malfa

Member of the Constituent Assembly
- In office 25 June 1946 – 31 January 1948
- Constituency: Single national constituency

Member of the Chamber of Deputies
- In office 8 May 1948 – 24 June 1953
- Constituency: Single national constituency

Personal details
- Born: 22 May 1902 Milan, Italy
- Died: 6 February 1980 (aged 77) Rome, Italy
- Party: PSI (until 1948); UdS (1948–1949); PSU (1949–1951); PSDI (since 1951)
- Other party: UDNR (1960s)

Ivan Matteo Lombardo (22 May 1902 – 6 February 1980) was an Italian politician.

== Early life ==
Lombardo was born in Milan in 1902. A budding young journalist, from 1920 to 1922 he was editor of the labour section of Avanti!, the daily newspaper of the Italian Socialist Party (Partito Socialista Italiano; PSI). Following Benito Mussolini's assumption of power he was conscripted into the Italian army, serving in Libya until 1925. He then spent the next twenty years engaged in "activity in trade and export business, market research, [and] management of industrial plants." In 1942 he was involved in reconstituting the PSI, which had been banned by Mussolini 16 years previously. According to his biography on the Historical Archives of the European Union website, he was "very active" during this time in the Italian Resistance.

== Political career ==
Hitherto a discreet industrialist, Lombardo was thrust into the limelight upon being nominated as secretary of the PSI in April 1946. Regarded as an implacable opponent of communism, he was selected for the role (without his knowledge) by the leader of the PSI's right-wing current, Giuseppe Saragat, and was accepted as a compromise candidate by the other leading factions at the party's annual spring conference in Florence. Lombardo was in Washington, D.C. as part of an official trade delegation when the decision was announced (in his capacity as Under-Secretary of Commerce and Industry in De Gasperi's first government), and he found out about it – with much incredulity and bemusement – only after reading reports on the conference in the American press and upon receiving congratulatory telegrams from well-wishers. He served as secretary for an interim period, and in January 1947 was replaced by Lelio Basso.

Following the 'Palazzo Barberini split' later that year – which established a new party led by Saragat, the Italian Socialist Workers' Party (Partito Socialista dei Lavoratori Italiani; PSLI) – Lombardo chose to remain with the PSI. Indeed, at the 1947 International Socialist Conference in Zurich he even hatched an unsuccessful plan to reunite the two parties, aided by the diplomat Francesco Malfatti and the British Labour Party politician Denis Healey. However, when the PSI formed an electoral alliance with the Italian Communist Party in early 1948 Lombardo founded his own breakaway grouping, the Union of Socialists (Unione dei Socialisti; UdS). At the general election in April of that year he and the UdS allied with Saragat's PSLI to form a joint ticket under the banner of Socialist Unity (Unità Socialista), which gained 7.1% of the votes cast for the Italian Chamber of Deputies and 33 seats. Lombardo later argued that his principal reason for leaving the PSI was its opposition to the Marshall Plan, as he explained to Philip C. Brooks of the Harry S. Truman Library in 1964:

Since the [PSI] Convention had decided to join the Communists in the Popular Front, and feature as the fundamental issue for the incoming general elections a staunch opposition to the Marshall Plan, I had no choice but to quit the party, and I formed a group which participated in the election campaign on the same ballot with Saragat's Social Democratic Party [sic]... For many years a large section of the Italian public opinion, which was heavily influenced by Communists, was convinced that the intent of the Marshall Plan was to destroy the industrial and agricultural structure of our society.

Lombardo was secretary of the UdS until June 1949, when he was succeeded by Ignazio Silone. In December of that year the party was dissolved, and its members joined forces with the former Minister of the Interior, Giuseppe Romita, to create another new group, the Unitary Socialist Party (Partito Socialista Unitario; PSU). Soon afterwards Lombardo joined the PSLI, which in turn merged with the PSU in 1951 to form the Italian Democratic Socialist Party (Partito Socialista Democratico Italiano; PSDI).

During this time Lombardo was twice a government minister, firstly as Minister of Industry and Commerce from 23 May 1948 to 7 November 1949 (De Gasperi V Cabinet), and then as Minister of Foreign Trade from 27 January 1950 to 5 April 1951 (De Gasperi VI Cabinet). He stood down as a Member of Parliament at the end of the first legislature in June 1953. Two years later, in 1955, he was appointed as President of the General Committee and of the Board of the National Council for Productivity (CNP) in Rome, and in 1959–60 he served as head of the Atlantic Treaty Association (ATA) in Brussels.

== Later years ==
Although he remained a social democrat throughout the 1950s, Lombardo increasingly fraternised with those outside the democratic left who, like him, were discomfited by the apparent inability of the Italian state to contain the threat posed by international communism. Adamant that only a powerful, anti-communist executive and an end to partitocrazia ("particracy") could halt the instability then plaguing the First Republic, in 1963 Lombardo signed a manifesto – together with Randolfo Pacciardi, Tomaso Smith, Alfredo Morea, Raffaele Cadorna and Mario Vinciguerra – proposing the establishment of a presidential republic similar to that recently introduced in France by Charles de Gaulle. This manifesto soon evolved into a new centrist political party led by Pacciardi, the Democratic Union for the New Republic (Unione Democratica per la Nuova Repubblica; UDNR), which made very little electoral impact but was noted for its association with figures from the neo-fascist right, such as Enzo Maria Dantini, Fabio De Felice and Giano Accame, who were attracted to the party by its emphasis on strong, personalised leadership and promises to "remake the state". Although Lombardo was described in contemporary press reports as a founder member of the new party, he seemingly never campaigned on its behalf.

Outside of these domestic intrigues, Lombardo's latter-day political activities mostly focused on his engagement with various international organisations dedicated to the defeat of communism. In the 1960s he argued that Italy was uniquely exposed to the threat of Soviet invasion due to her exposed position in the Mediterranean, describing the country as "a potential bridgehead which could become the passage into Western Europe or the passage into the African continent". He expanded on these themes at a well-publicised conference on 'revolutionary war', organised in May 1965 by the Alberto Pollio Institute for Military Studies at the Parco dei Principi Hotel in Rome, where he presented a paper entitled 'Permanent communist war against the West'. This conference, which was funded through the Institute by the Italian military intelligence agency SIFAR, has since come to be regarded as a foundational moment in the strategia della tenzione ("strategy of tension"), and was attended by several individuals who were later involved in various neo-fascist terror campaigns.

Such interventions, and others besides, have led commentators such as Jeffrey Bale and Massimo Bonanni to define Lombardo, in these final decades, as belonging on the conservative right of the political spectrum. Although still an Atlanticist and a pro-European, his associations with extreme-right organisations such as the Salazarist Convergência Occidental and the World Anti-Communist League were well known in anti-communist circles. In 1997, it was revealed by the would-be plotter and political renegade Edgardo Sogno that, had his attempt at leading a coup d'état in 1974 (the so-called Golpe Bianco, or "White Coup") been successful, he would have installed Lombardo as Minister of Finance in the resulting emergency government, alongside Pacciardi, Accame and other kindred spirits (some of whom, such as the politician and journalist Eugenio Reale, were apparently unaware of what was being proposed in their name).

== Death and legacy ==
Lombardo died in Rome in 1980, aged 77. His body is buried in the Monumental Cemetery of Milan. His collection of papers has since been deposited at the Historical Archives of the European Union in Florence.

== Awards and honours ==
Knight Grand Cross of the Order of Merit of the Italian Republic (Italy), awarded on 2 June 1955.
Grand Cross of the Order of Prince Henry (Portugal), awarded on 6 December 1966.
