= Piero Calamandrei =

Italian writer, jurist, and politician (1889–1956)

- Calamandrei in the 1940s

Member of the Chamber of Deputies
- In office 8 May 1948 – 24 June 1953
- Constituency: Italy at-large

Member of the Constituent Assembly
- In office 25 June 1946 – 31 January 1948
- Constituency: Italy at-large

Personal details
- Born: 21 April 1889 Florence, Kingdom of Italy
- Died: 27 September 1956 (aged 67) Florence, Italy
- Party: PdA (1942–1947); PSI (1947–1948); UdS (1948–1949); PSU (1949–1951); PSDI (1951–1953); UP (1953–1955)
- Occupation: Jurist, journalist, poet, anti-fascist activist, politician

Piero Calamandrei (21 April 1889 – 27 September 1956) was an Italian author, jurist, soldier, university professor, and politician. He was one of Italy's leading authorities on the law of civil procedure.

== Early life and education ==
Calamandrei was born in Florence. After studies in Pisa and Rome, he assumed a professorship at the law school at the University of Messina in 1915. He fought as a volunteer in the 218th infantry regiment in World War I, rising to the rank of captain, and turning down a further promotion to resume teaching. In 1918, he resumed teaching at the University of Modena, then went on to teach at the law school in Siena, and finally, in Florence. His notable works include La cassazione civile (Appellate Review of Civil Judgments) (1920) and Studi sul processo civile (1930). He also co-founded the journals Rivista di diritto processuale (1924), Il foro toscano (The Tuscan Courts) (1926) and Il Ponte (The Bridge) (1945), and participated in the 1942 revision of the Italian code of civil procedure.

== Career ==
Calamandrei was highly critical of Italian fascism; he signed Benedetto Croce's 1925 Manifesto of the Anti-Fascist Intellectuals and was linked to the Florentine journal Non mollare! (Don't Give Up!) published between January and October 1925. After the fall of the fascist regime in 1943, the Allies named him rector of the University of Florence. He was elected to the Constituent Assembly of Italy in 1945 as a member of the Action Party (PdA), a liberal socialist and social liberal party, and to the Chamber of Deputies in 1948 as a member of the Italian Socialist Party (PSI).

On 4 December 1952, Calamandrei penned the antifascist poem, Lapide ad ignominia ("A Monument to Ignominy"). The German general Albert Kesselring who was responsible for various war crimes during the Nazi occupation of Italy had been sentenced to death, a sentence that was later commuted. When Kesselring was freed, he refused to repent for his crimes and claimed the Italians ought to build him a monument for his good work there. Calamandrei responded with this poem, stating that if Kesselring returned, he would indeed find a monument but one stronger than stone and comprising the fighters within the Italian resistance movement who "willingly took up arms, to preserve dignity, not to promote hate, and who decided to fight back against the shame and terror of the world". Calamandrei's poem appears in monuments in the towns of Cuneo and Montepulciano.

Calamandrei died in Florence at the age of 67.

== Works ==
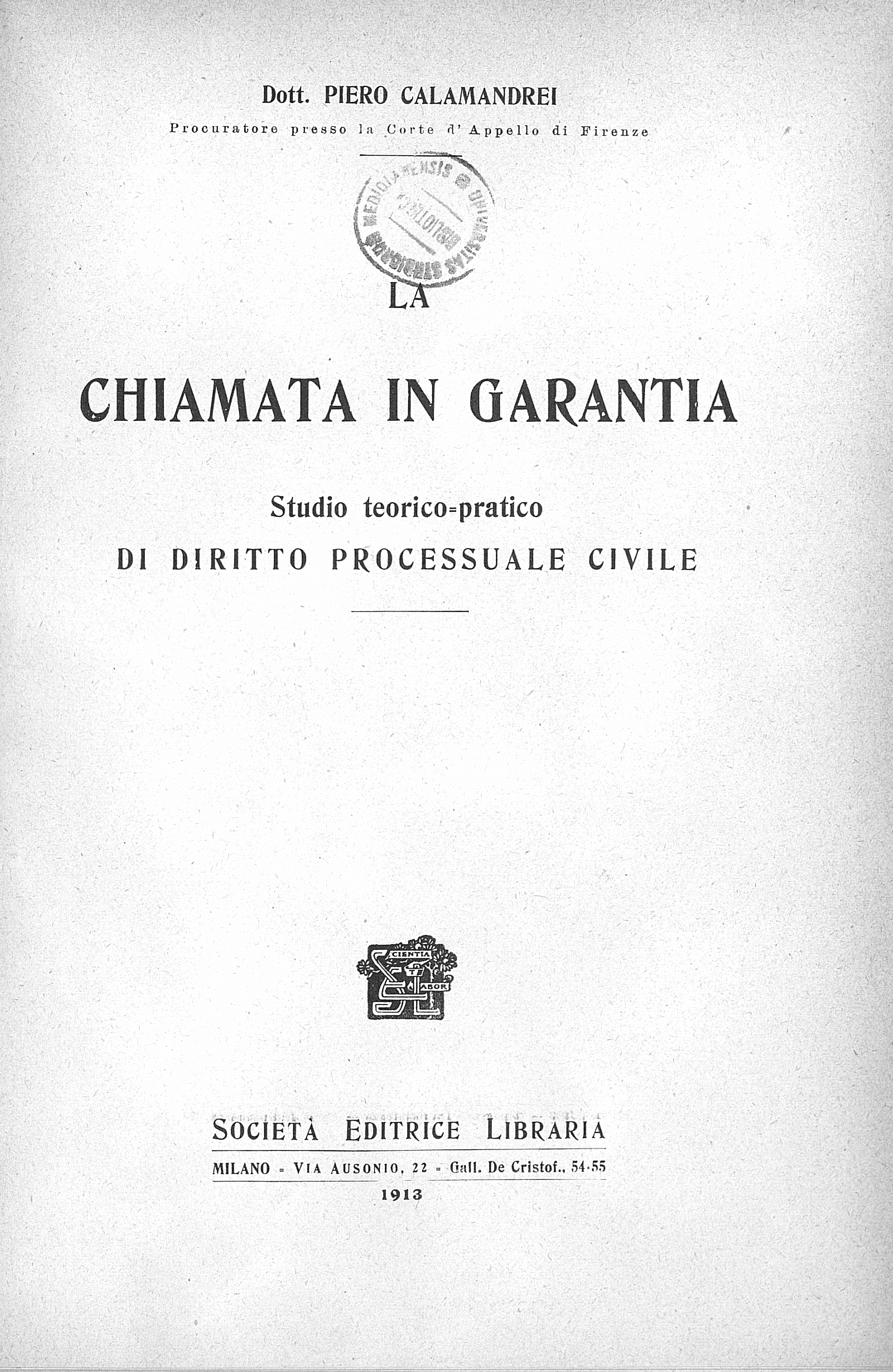
Chiamata in garantia, 1913

- Chiamata in garantia (in Italian). Milano: Società Edittrice Libraria. 1913.
- Troppi avvocati! (Quaderni della Voce ed.). Firenze. 1921.
- Elogio dei giudici scritto da un avvocato. Direnze: Le Monnier. 1935. - III edition doubled, Le Monnier, 1954; introduction by Paolo Barile, Firenze, Ponte alle Grazie, 1989.
- Delle buone relazioni fra giudici e avvocati nel nuovo processo civile. Due dialoghi, Firenze, Le Monnier, 1941
- Inventario della casa di campagna. Roma: Tumminelli. 1945. [I ed. privata 1941]; G. Mazzoni Rajna ed., Firenze, La Nuova Italia, 1965; preface by Giorgio Luti, Vallecchi, 1989; Christophe Carraud ed., Edizioni di Storia e Letteratura, 2013, ISBN 978-88-6372-489-9.
- Costruire la democrazia. Premesse alla Costituente, Edizioni U, 1946; Montepulciano (Siena), Le Balze, 2004.
- Sergio Luzzatto, ed. (1955). Uomini e città della Resistenza. Bari: Laterza., preface by Carlo Azeglio Ciampi, Laterza, 2006.
- Parlare di Firenze, Firenze, La Nuova Italia, 1958.
- Opere giuridiche, Mauro Cappelletti ed., 10 voll., Morano, Napoli
- Scritti e discorsi politici (vol.1: Storia di dodici anni; vol.II: Discorsi parlamentari e politica costituzionale), Norberto Bobbio ed., La Nuova Italia, Firenze 1966
- Lettere 1915-1956, 2 voll., Giorgio Agosti and Alessandro Galante Garrone ed., Firenze, La Nuova Italia, 1968.
- Scritti ed inediti celliniani, Firenze, La Nuova Italia, 1971.
- La burla di Primavera con altre fiabe, e prose sparse, Palermo, Sellerio, 1987.
- In difesa dell'onestà e della libertà della scuola, Palermo, Sellerio, 1994.
- Diario (1939-1945), Giorgio Agosti and Alessandro Galante Garrone ed., Firenze, La Nuova Italia, 1982; riedizione 1997.
- La Costituzione e leggi per attuarla, Milano, Giuffré, 2000.
- Futuro postumo: testi inediti 1950, Silvia Calamandrei ed., Montepulciano (SI), Le Balze, 2004.
- Costituzione e le leggi di Antigone, Firenze, Sansoni, 2004.
- Ada con gli occhi stellanti. Lettere 1908-1914, Palermo, Sellerio 2005.
- Zona di guerra. Lettere, scritti e discorsi (1915-1924), S. Calamandrei and A. Casellato ed., Collana Storia e Società, Roma-Bari, Laterza, 2007.
- Una famiglia in guerra. Lettere e scritti (1939-1956), with Franco Calamandrei, Alessandro Casellato ed., Roma-Bari, Laterza, 2008.
- Fede nel diritto, Roma-Bari, Laterza, 2008.
- Per la scuola, Palermo, Sellerio, 2008.
- Lo Stato siamo noi, preface by Giovanni De Luna, Milano, Chiarelettere, 2011. [collection of writings 1946 - 1956]
- Chiarezza nella Costituzione, introduction by C. A. Ciampi, Roma, Edizioni di Storia e Letteratura, 2012.
- Non c'è libertà senza legalità, Roma-Bari, Laterza 2013.
- Il fascismo come regime della menzogna, Roma-Bari, Laterza, 2014.
- Il mio primo processo, Milano, Henry Beyle, 2014.
- Un incontro con Piero Della Francesca, Milano, Henry Beyle, 2015.
- Gli avvocati, Milano, Henry Beyle, 2015.
- Diario (1939–45), edizione integrale riscontrata su manoscritto, Roma, Edizioni di Storia e Letteratura, 2015.
- Colloqui con Franco. Roma: Edizioni di Storia e Letteratura. 2016. ISBN 978-88-6372-884-2.
- Vino colorato artificialmente con sostanza vietata dalla legge, Milano, Henry Beyle, 2016.
- La politica non è una professione. Milano: Edizioni Henry Beyle. 2018.
