= Militant Christian Party =

Militant Christian Party Partito Cristiano Militante
- Chamber of Deputies: 0 / 574

The Militant Christian Party (Italian: Partito Cristiano Militante) was a political party in Italy. The party was founded following a split from the Christian Democracy ahead of the 1953 general election.

In the 1953 election, the party contested the Bari-Foggia constituency. The list of the party got 1,473 votes (0.16% of the votes in the constituency).
