= National Democratic Alliance (Italy) =

Italian political party

National Democratic Alliance Alleanza Democratica Nazionale
- Leader: Epicarmo Corbino, Giuseppe Nitti, Raffaele Terranova
- Founded: 1953
- Dissolved: 1954
- Split from: Italian Liberal Party
- Ideology: Liberalism
- Political position: Centre

The National Democratic Alliance (Italian: Alleanza Democratica Nazionale, ADN) was a short-lived liberal political party in Italy.

It was formed in March 1953 by disgruntled members of the Italian Liberal Party (PLI), who did not agree with the new electoral law approved by the Parliament with the support of their party. Its leaders were Epicarmo Corbino and Giuseppe Nitti. Also non-Liberals joined: Raffaele Terranova, a Christian Democrat, Franco Antonicelli, a Republican, and Andrea Finocchiaro Aprile, former leader of the Sicilian Independentist Movement.

The party won 0.4% of the vote in the 1953 general election and soon after was disbanded, but obtained its goal: thanks to ADN and Popular Unity, the governing coalition did not pass the 50% of the vote, which would have given to it a majority bonus (two-thirds of the seats in the Chamber of Deputies).
