= Union of Socialists =

Union of Socialists Unione dei Socialisti
- Leader: Ivan Matteo Lombardo
- Founded: 8 February 1948
- Dissolved: December 1949
- Split from: Italian Socialist Party of Proletarian Unity
- Merged into: Unitary Socialist Party
- Ideology: Democratic socialism Social democracy
- Political position: Centre-left
- National affiliation: Socialist Unity

The Union of Socialists (Italian: Unione dei Socialisti, UdS) was a social-democratic political party in Italy. Its outlook was democratic socialist, reformist, anti-fascist, and part of the anti-Stalinist left. The party was founded in February 1948 by Ivan Matteo Lombardo, former secretary of the Italian Socialist Party. The UdS participated in the 1948 Italian general election as part of the Socialist Unity coalition with the Italian Socialist Workers' Party (Partito Socialista dei Lavoratori Italiani, PSLI), which collectively received 7.1% of the vote for the Chamber of Deputies and gained 33 seats. However, out of them only Lombardo and Piero Calamandrei were members of the UdS.

Lombardo was succeeded as the party's leader by Ignazio Silone in June 1949. In December 1949, the UdS was dissolved into the Unitary Socialist Party (Partito Socialista Unitario, PSU), which itself subsequently merged with the PSLI to form the Italian Democratic Socialist Party (Partito Socialista Democratico Italiano, PSDI) in 1951.
