= Popular Unity (Italy) =

Popular Unity Unità Popolare
- Leader: Piero Calamandrei, Ferruccio Parri
- Founded: 18 April 1953
- Dissolved: 27 October 1957
- Merger of: Socialist Autonomy Movement; Union of Republican Rebirth; Justice and Freedom
- Merged into: Italian Socialist Party
- Newspaper: Nuova Repubblica
- Ideology: Social democracy Social liberalism
- Political position: Centre-left

Popular Unity (Italian: Unità Popolare, UP) was a short-lived social-democratic and social-liberal and political party in Italy. Its leaders were Piero Calamandrei, a Democratic Socialist, and Ferruccio Parri, a Republican and former Prime Minister.

== History ==
Popular Unity was formed in April 1953 by disgruntled members of the Italian Democratic Socialist Party (PSDI) and the Italian Republican Party (PRI), who again did not agree with the new electoral law.

Three different parties came together in Popular Unity:

- Socialist Autonomy Movement (Movimento di Autonomia Socialista), officially established on 1 February 1953 in Vicenza, on the initiative of the ex-social democrats Piero Calamandrei, Tristano Codignola and Antonio Greppi;
- Union of Republican Rebirth (Unione di Rinascita Repubblicana), established on 8 December 1952 by a group of left-wing dissidents of the Italian Republican Party, led by Oliviero Zuccarini and Marcello Morante and to which, subsequently, Ferruccio Parri had joined;
- Justice and Freedom (Giustizia e Libertà), a political organization established on 18 January 1953 by the writer Carlo Cassola, taking up the name of the homonymous anti-fascist movement of Carlo Rosselli.

The party won 0.6% of the vote in the 1953 general election and, along with the like-minded National Democratic Alliance, prevented the governing coalition from passing the 50% and getting the majority bonus (two thirds of the seats in the Chamber of Deputies).

The party was active until 1957. After that, some of its members joined the Italian Socialist Party, but most of them returned to their former parties.
