= 1953 Italian general election =

- 7 June 1953

All 590 seats in the Chamber of Deputies 296 seats needed for a majority All 237 elective seats in the Senate 122 seats needed for a majority (Note: taking into account the Senators for life, which accounted for 6 seats at the time the election took place)
- Registered: 30,272,236 (C) · 27,172,871 (S)
- Turnout: 28,406,479 (C) · 93.8% (▲1.6 pp); 25,483,201 (S) · 93.8% (▲1.6 pp)
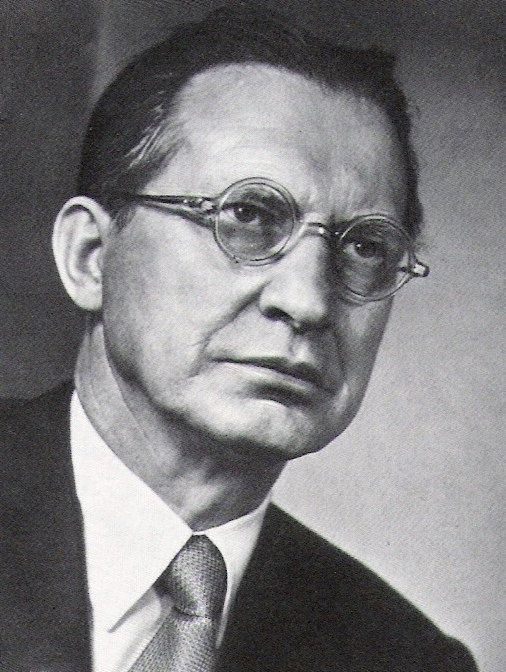

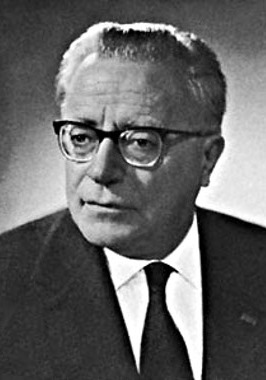

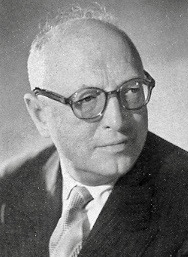

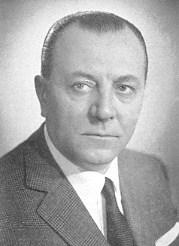

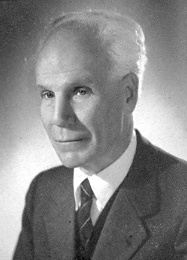

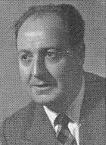
	Majority party	Minority party	Third party
Leader	Alcide De Gasperi (Note: Although Guido Gonella was the secretary of the Christian Democracy at the time of the election, Alcide De Gasperi was nonetheless considered the party's undisputed leader.)	Palmiro Togliatti	Pietro Nenni
Party	DC	PCI	PSI
Leader since	29 December 1944	15 May 1943 (Note: Togliatti also served as secretary of the Communist Party of Italy from 1926 to 1934 and from 1938 to 1943.)	16 May 1949 (Note: Nenni also served as secretary from 1933 to 1939 and from 1943 to 1945.)
Leader's seat	Trento (C)	Rome (C)	Rome (C)
Seats won	263 (C) / 112 (S)	143 (C) / 52 (S)	75 (C) / 26 (S)
Seat change	▼57 (C) / ▼19 (S)	▲19 (C) / ▲20 (S)	▲30 (C) / ▲12 (S)
Popular vote	10,862,073 (C); 9,660,210 (S)	6,120,809 (C); 4,910,077 (S)	3,441,014 (C); 2,891,605 (S)
Percentage	40.1% (C); 39.8% (S)	22.6% (C); 20.2% (S)	12.7% (C); 11.9% (S)
Swing	▼8.4 pp (C) ▼8.3 pp (S)	— (Note: PCI and PSI ran in a unified list in the 1948 election, named Popular Democratic Front (FDP).)	—
	Fourth party	Fifth party	Sixth party
Leader	Alfredo Covelli	Augusto De Marsanich	Giuseppe Saragat
Party	PNM	MSI	PSDI
Leader since	11 June 1946	10 January 1950	7 October 1952 (Note: Saragat also served as secretary from 1949 to 1952.)
Leader's seat	Benevento (C)	L'Aquila (C)	Turin (C)
Seats won	40 (C) / 14 (S)	29 (C) / 9 (S)	19 (C) / 4 (S)
Seat change	▲26 (C) / ▲10 (S)	▲23 (C) / ▲8 (S)	▼14 (C) / ▼4 (S)
Popular vote	1,854,850 (C); 1,581,128 (S)	1,582,154 (C); 1,473,645 (S)	1,222,957 (C); 1,046,301 (S)
Percentage	6.9% (C); 6.5% (S)	5.8% (C); 6.1% (S)	4.5% (C); 4.3% (S)
Swing	▲4.1 pp (C) ▲4.8 pp (S)	▲3.8 pp (C) ▲5.4 pp (S)	▼2.6 pp (C) ▲0.1 pp (S)
Prime Minister before election
Alcide De Gasperi
DC
Prime Minister after the election
Alcide De Gasperi
DC

The 1953 Italian general election was held in Italy on Sunday 7 June 1953.

== "Scam law" ==
The election was characterized by changes in the electoral law. Even if the general structure remained uncorrupted, the government introduced a superbonus of two thirds of seats in the Chamber of Deputies for the coalition which would obtain at-large the absolute majority of votes. The change was hugely opposed by the opposition parties as well as the smaller Christian Democracy's coalition partners, which had no realistic chances of success. The new law was called "scam law" by its detractors, including some dissidents of minor government parties who founded special opposition groups to deny the artificial landslide to Christian Democracy. Its parliamentarian exam had a disruptive effect: "Among the iron pots of political forces that faced in the Cold War, Senate cracked as earthenware pot."

== Historical background ==
In the 1950s, Italy became a founding member of the NATO alliance (1949), a member of the United Nations (1955) and an ally of the United States, which helped to revive the Italian economy through the Marshall Plan. In the same years, Italy also became a founding member of the European Coal and Steel Community (1952) and of the European Economic Community (1957), later developed into the European Union. At the end of the 1950s an impressive economic growth was termed "Economic Miracle". Italian families used their newfound wealth to purchase consumer durables for the first time. Between 1958 and 1965, the percentage of families owning a television rose from 12% to 49%, washing machines from 3% to 23%, and fridges from 13% to 55%.

Christian Democracy's main support areas, sometimes known as "vote tanks", were the rural areas in South, Center, and North-East Italy, whereas the industrial North-West had more left-leaning support because of the larger working class. An interesting exception were the "red regions" (Emilia-Romagna, Tuscany, and Umbria) where the Italian Communist Party has historically had a wide support. This is considered a consequence of the particular sharecropping ("mezzadria") farming contracts used in these regions.

The Holy See actively supported Christian Democracy, judging it would be a mortal sin for a Catholic to vote for the Communist party and excommunicating all its supporters; however, in practice many Communists remained religious, and Emilia was known to be an area where people were both religious and communists. Giovannino Guareschi wrote his novels about Don Camillo describing a village, Brescello, whose inhabitants are at the same time loyal to priest Camillo and communist mayor Peppone, who are fierce rivals.

In 1953, a Parliamentary Commission on poverty estimated that 24% of Italian families were either "destitute" or "in hardship", 21% of dwellings were overcrowded, 52% of homes in the South had no running drinking water, and only 57% had a lavatory. In the 1950s, several important reforms were launched, such as agrarian reform (Scelba law), fiscal reform (Vanoni law), and the country enjoyed a period of economic boom and development (miracolo economico, or "economic miracle"). In this period of time, a massive population transfer, from the impoverished South to the booming industrial North, took place. This exacerbated social contrasts, including between the old-established "worker aristocracy" and the new less qualified immigrants ("operaio-massa") of Southern origin. In addition, a wide gap between rich and poor continued to exist. By the end of the 1960s, it was estimated that 4 million Italians (out of a population of 54.5 million) were unemployed, underemployed, and casual labourers. As noted by the historian Paul Ginsborg, the affluent society to this section of the Italian population "might have meant a television set but precious little else."

== Parties and leaders ==
Party	Ideology	Leader	Seats in 1953		
Party	Ideology	Leader	C	S	Total
Christian Democracy (DC)	Christian democracy	Alcide De Gasperi	305	131	436
Italian Communist Party (PCI)	Communism	Palmiro Togliatti	183	72	255
Italian Socialist Party (PSI)	Democratic socialism	Pietro Nenni	183	72	255
Italian Democratic Socialist Party (PSDI)	Social democracy	Giuseppe Saragat	33	8	41
Italian Liberal Party (PLI)	Conservative liberalism	Bruno Villabruna	14	7	21
Monarchist National Party (PNM)	Monarchism	Alfredo Covelli	14	3	17
Italian Republican Party (PRI)	Liberalism	Oronzo Reale	9	6	15
Italian Social Movement (MSI)	Neo-fascism	Augusto De Marsanich	6	1	7

== Results ==
The complaint campaign of the oppositions against the "scam law" reached its goal. The centrist coalition (DC, PSDI, PLI, PRI, SVP, and PSd'Az) won 49.9% of the national vote, coming just a few thousand votes short of the threshold for a two-thirds majority; the election resulted in an ordinary proportional distribution of the seats. Minor dissident parties resulted determinant for the final result, especially the short-lived National Democratic Alliance. DC, the leading party, did not repeat the result of five years before, which had been obtained under special conditions linked to the Cold War, and lost a lot of votes to the right wing, which included resurgent Italian Fascist and neo-fascist politicians, particularly in Southern Italy.

While the government won the election with a clear working majority of seats in both houses, frustration at the failure to garner the expected supermajority caused big problems for the leading coalition. Alcide De Gasperi was forced to resign by the Italian Parliament on August 2; he retired and died twelve months later. The legislature continued with weak governments, with minor parties refusing institutional responsibilities. Giuseppe Pella rose to power but fell after five months only following strong disputes about the status of the Free Territory of Trieste, which Pella was claiming. Amintore Fanfani not receiving a vote of confidence, Mario Scelba and Antonio Segni followed with more traditional centrist coalitions supported by the PSDI and the PLI; under the administration of the first one, the problem of Trieste was closed ceding Koper to Yugoslavia. The parliamentary term was closed by the minority government chaired by Adone Zoli, finishing a legislature which hugely weakened the office of the Prime Minister, held by six different rulers.

=== Chamber of Deputies ===
Party or alliance		Votes	%	Seats	+/–
Centrist coalition	Christian Democracy	10,862,073	40.10	263	–41
Centrist coalition	Italian Democratic Socialist Party	1,222,957	4.51	19	–14
Centrist coalition	Italian Liberal Party	815,929	3.01	13	–6
Centrist coalition	Italian Republican Party	438,149	1.62	5	–4
Centrist coalition	South Tyrolean People's Party	122,474	0.45	3	0
Centrist coalition	Sardinian Action Party	27,231	0.10	0	–1
Centrist coalition	Trentino Tyrolean People's Party	1,714	0.01	0	New
Italian Communist Party		6,120,809	22.60	143	+13
Italian Socialist Party		3,441,014	12.70	75	+22
Monarchist National Party		1,854,850	6.85	40	+26
Italian Social Movement		1,582,154	5.84	29	+23
Independent Socialist Union		225,409	0.83	0	New
Popular Unity		171,099	0.63	0	New
National Democratic Alliance		120,685	0.45	0	New
Left-wing independents		21,920	0.08	0	New
Italian Political Centre		14,493	0.05	0	New
Italian National Monarchist Party		8,089	0.03	0	New
Monarchist List		6,759	0.02	0	New
Democratic National Union of Civil Servants		6,581	0.02	0	New
Italian Nettist Party		4,305	0.02	0	New
Socialist Radical Party		3,283	0.01	0	New
Federated National Party		2,895	0.01	0	New
Christian Social Movement		2,799	0.01	0	New
Italian Female Movement		1,752	0.01	0	New
Militant Christian Party		1,473	0.01	0	New
Italian National Movement		1,257	0.00	0	New
Italian Social Unitary Party		1,101	0.00	0	New
National Will Party		1,010	0.00	0	New
Italian Federalist Party		866	0.00	0	New
Garibaldian Antifascist Partisan Movement of Italy		762	0.00	0	New
Universal Existentialist Party		716	0.00	0	New
National Union Party		563	0.00	0	New
Independents		530	0.00	0	New
Total		27,087,701	100.00	590	+16
Valid votes		27,087,701	95.36		
Invalid/blank votes		1,318,778	4.64		
Total votes		28,406,479	100.00		
Registered voters/turnout		30,272,236	93.84		
Source: Ministry of the Interior

Popular vote
DC	40.10%
PCI	22.60%
PSI	12.70%
PNM	6.85%
MSI	5.84%
PSDI	4.51%
PLI	3.01%
PRI	1.62%
Others	2.77%

Seats
DC	44.85%
PCI	24.24%
PSI	12.71%
PNM	6.78%
MSI	4.92%
PSDI	3.22%
PLI	2.20%
PRI	0.85%
Others	0.81%

==== By constituency ====
Constituency	Total seats	Seats won								
Constituency	Total seats	DC	PCI	PSI	PNM	MSI	PSDI	PLI	PRI	Others
Turin	26	11	7	4	1		2	1		
Cuneo	16	8	3	2	1		1	1		
Genoa	17	8	5	3			1			
Milan	36	16	8	7	1	1	2	1		
Como	15	9	2	3			1			
Brescia	19	13	2	3			1			
Mantua	10	5	2	3						
Trentino	8	5								3
Verona	28	17	4	4		1	1	1		
Venice	16	10	2	3			1			
Udine	15	9	2	2		1	1			
Bologna	22	7	10	3			1		1	
Parma	19	7	8	3			1			
Florence	13	5	6	2						
Pisa	13	6	5	2						
Siena	10	3	5	2						
Ancona	15	8	4	3						
Perugia	11	4	3	3		1				
Rome	38	15	10	3	3	4	1	1	1	
L'Aquila	14	7	4	1	1	1				
Campobasso	5	3	1					1		
Naples	31	12	7	2	7	2		1		
Benevento	20	8	4	1	5	1		1		
Bari	22	9	6	2	4	1				
Lecce	16	8	4	1	2	1				
Potenza	7	4	2		1					
Catanzaro	25	11	6	3	2	2		1		
Catania	25	10	6	2	3	3		1		
Palermo	25	11	6	2	3	3				
Cagliari	14	7	4	1	1	1				
Aosta Valley	1	1								
National	37	6	5	4	5	6	5	3	3	
Total	590	263	143	74	40	29	19	13	5	3

=== Senate of the Republic ===
Party	Votes	%	Seats	+/–
Christian Democracy	9,660,210	39.76	112	−19
Italian Communist Party	4,910,077	20.21	52	+6
Italian Socialist Party	2,891,605	11.90	26	−15
Monarchist National Party	1,581,128	6.51	14	+10
Italian Social Movement	1,473,645	6.07	9	+8
Italian Democratic Socialist Party	1,046,301	4.31	4	−4
Italian Liberal Party	695,816	2.86	3	−4
Italian Republican Party	261,713	1.08	0	−4
Popular Unity	172,545	0.71	0	New
National Democratic Alliance	165,845	0.68	1	New
South Tyrolean People's Party	107,139	0.44	2	0
Autonomy Aosta – Peace	16,873	0.07	0	New
Other parties	1,313,380	5.41	14	–
Total	24,296,277	100.00	237	0
Valid votes	24,296,277	95.34		
Invalid/blank votes	1,186,924	4.66		
Total votes	25,483,201	100.00		
Registered voters/turnout	27,172,871	93.78		
Source: Ministry of the Interior

Popular vote
DC	39.76%
PCI	20.21%
PSI	11.90%
PNM	6.51%
MSI	6.07%
PSDI	4.31%
PLI	2.86%
PRI	1.08%
Others	7.30%

Seats
DC	47.26%
PCI	21.94%
PSI	10.97%
PNM	5.91%
MSI	3.80%
PSDI	1.69%
PLI	1.27%
Others	5.06%

==== By constituency ====
Constituency	Total seats	Seats won							
Constituency	Total seats	DC	PCI	PSI	PNM	MSI	PSDI	PLI	Others
Piedmont	17	8	4	2			1	1	1
Aosta Valley	1	1							
Lombardy	31	16	6	6	1	1	1		
Trentino-Alto Adige	6	4							2
Veneto	19	12	3	3			1		
Friuli-Venezia Giulia	6	4	1	1					
Liguria	8	4	3	1					
Emilia-Romagna	17	3	6	3			1		4
Tuscany	15	6	6	3					
Umbria	6	2	2	2					
Marche	7	4	2	1					
Lazio	16	8	4	1	1	2			
Abruzzo and Molise	8	5							3
Campania	21	9	3	1	5	1		1	1
Apulia	15	7	4	1	2	1			
Basilicata	6	3	2		1				
Calabria	10	5	2	1	1	1			
Sicily	22	8	4		3	3		1	3
Sardinia	6	4							2
Total	237	112	52	26	14	9	4	3	17
