= Socialist Unity (Italy) =

Italian political party

Socialist Unity Unità Socialista
- Leader: Giuseppe Saragat
- Founded: 1948
- Dissolved: 1949
- Split from: Italian Socialist Party
- Merged into: Italian Democratic Socialist Party
- Headquarters: Rome, Italy
- Ideology: Social democracy
- Political position: Centre-left
- International affiliation: Socialist International

Socialist Unity (Italian: Unità Socialista, US) was a social-democratic political alliance in Italy which participated in the key 1948 general election, which decided the post-war direction of Italy.

Socialist Unity was formed by the Italian Socialist Workers' Party (Partito Socialista dei Lavoratori Italiani), of Giuseppe Saragat and the Union of Socialists (Unione dei Socialisti) of former Italian Socialist Party leader Ivan Matteo Lombardo. The party's anti-communist ideology precluded any collaboration with the Italian Communist Party-led Popular Democratic Front in the 1948 election.

Socialist Unity reached 7.1% of the vote for the Italian Chamber of Deputies, gaining 33 seats. In the election for the Italian Senate, where it ran together with the Italian Republican Party, Socialist Unity won 8 seats.

In the following years, the links between the members of Socialist Unity became closer and the Italian Democratic Socialist Party (PSDI) was founded.

== Election results ==
Chamber of Deputies
Election year	Votes	%	Seats	+/−	Leader
1948	1,858,116 (3rd)	7.1	33 / 574	–	Giuseppe Saragat

Senate of the Republic
Election year	Votes	%	Seats	+/−	Leader
1948	943,219 (4th)	4.1	10 / 237	–	Giuseppe Saragat
