= Unitary Socialist Party (Italy, 1949) =

Defunct Italian political party

Unitary Socialist Party Partito Socialista Unitario
- Leader: Giuseppe Romita
- Founded: 7 December 1949
- Dissolved: 1 May 1951
- Merger of: Right-wing of the PSI; Part of Union of Socialists; Left-wing of the PSLI
- Merged into: Socialist Party (Italian Section of the Socialist International)
- Ideology: Democratic socialism Social democracy
- Political position: Centre-left
- International affiliation: Socialist International
- Colours: Red

The Unitary Socialist Party (Italian: Partito Socialista Unitario; PSU) was a social-democratic political party in Italy that existed from 1949 to 1951. The party was founded by moderate members of the Italian Socialist Party, who had unsuccessfully tried to stop the collaboration of their former party with the Italian Communist Party (PCI), and some leftist members of the Italian Socialist Workers' Party (Partito Socialista dei Lavoratori Italiani; PSLI), who sought a rupture with Christian Democracy (DC) and NATO. The party was led by the former interior minister Giuseppe Romita.

There were 15 member of the Chamber of Deputies who had joined the party. The goal of the party, which considered itself as transitional, was to reunite all Italian socialists in order to overrun both the PCI and the DC. The project had strong international support through the Socialist International; the French SFIO and the British Labour Party, at that time both in government, liked the idea of their Italian counterpart defeating parties funded by the Soviet Union and the United States, respectively.

The project was undoubtedly too ambitious, and it quickly stalled. One problem was a lack of money. As Ignazio Silone, then a leading member of the party, confessed in 1950: "The search for funds to pay for our extremely limited expenses become every month more difficult, more precarious, more humiliating.... I do not mean we have to liquidate the PSU and accept unification at any cost, but we have to say that we can no longer go on this way." On 1 May 1951, the party fused with the PSLI, led by Giuseppe Saragat, giving birth to the Italian Democratic Socialist Party (Partito Socialista Democratico Italiano, PSDI).

== See also ==
- Unitary Socialist Party (Italy, 1922)
- Unified Socialist Party (Italy)
