= Guido Seborga =

Italian painter

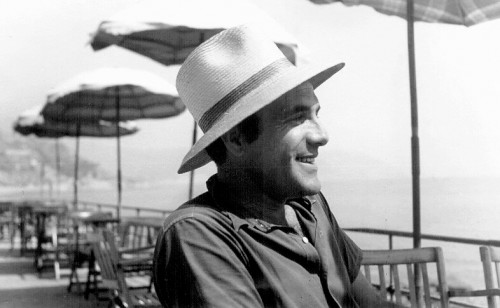
- Guido Seborga
- Born: Guido Hess; 10 October 1909; Turin, Italy
- Died: 13 February 1990 (aged 80); Turin, Italy
- Known for: journalist, poet, writer, painter
- Notable work: L'uomo di Camporosso (1948); Il figlio di Cain (1949)

Guido Seborga, pseudonym of Guido Hess (Turin, 10 October 1909 – Turin, 13 February 1990), was an Italian journalist, poet, painter and writer.

== Biography ==
=== Childhood ===
Born Guido Hess on 10 October 1909 in Turin, he belonged to a Jewish family of Egyptian origin which had settled in Liguria. He was the son of Adolfo Hess, a mountaineer, and a descendant of Moses Hess. The choice of the Seborga pseudonym comes from a small town west of the Ligurian hinterland. It is linked to his love for the sea and for the city which he considered his true hometown: Bordighera, a constant point of reference in his many trips abroad. His lived at Via Pelloux 44

Bordighera and its hinterland are the background of Seborga's literary works; the Vallée des Merveilles and the Ligurian Sea are the references of his art.

=== The antifascist youth ===
Seborga lived in an apartment at Corso Galileo Ferraris. He attended the Massimo d'Azeglio Classical Lyceum, where was taught by Augusto Monti. He had his first artistic experiences with Casorati. He lived in Berlin just before the arrival of Nazism, and then in Paris, a city in which he frequently returned throughout his life.

In Turin, he became friends with Umberto Mastroianni, who came from Rome in 1928, and with Lojze Spazzapan. Seborga also met the painters Mattia Moreni and Albino Galvano, the art critic Piero Bargis, the philosopher Óscar Navarro, the director Vincenzo Ciaffi, the architect Carlo Mollino, and the music critic Massimo Mila, with whom he discussed art and politics.

Antifascist groups in Turin led him to join the Italian resistance, first with the Action Party along with Giorgio Agosti, Alessandro Galante Garrone, Ada Gobetti and then as a partisan in the Matteotti Brigades.

=== Post-war ===
After the war, he joined the Italian Socialist Party. In Rome with Lelio Basso he directed the magazine Socialismo and he managed the propaganda of the Popular front, which was the union of the leftist parties.

Since the 1930s, he had worked together with Italian cultural magazines, such as Circoli, Campo di Marte, Prospettive, Letteratura Maestrale. After the war, he contributed to the republishing of the Turin newspaper Avanti!.

He participated with Ada Gobetti, Franco Antonicelli, Felice Casorati, Massimo Mila and others in the foundation of the Unione culturale di Torino ("Cultural Union of Turin"). He was among the organizers of the production of the play Woyzeck by Georg Büchner, with Raf Vallone and performed in 1946 for the reopening of the Gobetti Theatre in Turin.

In 1947 he decided to return to Paris, where he became the director of Italia Libera and worked with Europe and Minuit. From Paris, he continued to collaborate with the Italian newspapers writing about Parisian life and its intellectuals.

Once back from Paris, Seborga lived between Turin and Bordighera. His love for Bordighera came to expression in his participation in the cultural life of western Liguria. In the 1950s and 60s, Seborga was part of the organization and of the jury of the "Cinque Bettole" award in the categories literature and painting, with the likes of Italo Calvino, Giancarlo Vigorelli, Elio Philip Accrocca, Charles Betocchi and Giuseppe Balbo. In the 1960s he chaired the lecture series "Meet the man" in Sanremo, featuring, among others, Salvatore Quasimodo. He also contributed to the creation and the development of the Cultural Democratic Union of Bordighera, for which he helped to organize exhibitions, debates, lectures and plays.

Guido Seborga died in Turin on 13 February 1990.

== Painting ==
From an early age Seborga stayed in Bordighera and wandered in its hinterland. He was impressed by the Vallée des Merveilles and its rock incisions which were studied by Clarence Bicknell. From the 60s he started sketching and painting by creating "ideograms", a form of original painting that combines dynamic signs and the black silhouette of archaic figures on a background of contrasting chromatic levels. Full of energy, he began painting with great enthusiasm, working for the realization of several exhibitions. Of its monographic exhibitions, the best known are those of Sforza Castle in 1973 and the Galleria Schettini in 1977 in Milan. He also exhibited in Turin in 1969 at the Galleria Il Punto in 1974 at the Galleria Narciso and Galleria Civica d'Arte Moderna in Rivoli. He also personal exhibitions in Liguria, including Alassio at Sanremo and several in Bordighera, where he spent long months in his house in Via Pelloux 44.

He also exhibited abroad, in Amsterdam at the Sphynx Gallery (1969), in Menton in the Gallery Arts and Letters and during the Biennale (1970–1972), in Paris at the UNESCO Palace (1972), in Monte Carlo in 1979, in Marseille with the City Museum, in the Biennial of Bamberg, in Strasbourg in 1980, and then in other large cities such as Kraków, London, Lugano, Antibes, etc.

Guido Seborga always had a special focus on youth. There were many exhibitions and conferences in schools and high schools, with the stated goal of opening the minds of young people to the new artistic trends that roamed the world. His works are in private collections and Italian and foreign museums.

== Journalism ==
Journalism was the first love of Seborga and he would work all his life with several Italian and French newspapers. From the '30s he began working with small political papers to eventually end his journalistic career with the great Italian weekly press such as La Stampa, Il Giorno, Il Secolo XIX La Repubblica, etc. In the ‘40s he was appointed by Maria Luisa Spaziani as editor in chief of the literary magazine "Il girasole" first and then of "Il Dado». In the late '40s he lived in Paris where he was director of the Magazine "Italia libera".

== Literature ==
Arnoldo Mondadori Editore published in 1948 in the prestigious series Medusa, "L'uomo di Camporosso" and, in 1949, "Il figlio di Caino". The two novels, set in western Liguria, will be greeted by Italian and foreign critics with great interest.

Seborga is a writer of strong realistic inflection and, in his novels, he speaks generally of a world of outcasts who are struggling to survive in a tough and difficult land of Liguria, where work is hard and dangerous and where it becomes dangerous to defend beliefs at the time of the fascist regime.

These first two novels will be followed by four other titles translated into several languages and a newspaper published in 1968.

Seborga's characters are part of the drama of life, for better or for worse. They have no chance of escape without risking betrayal and of therefore becoming an accomplice of society. For Seborga automation is a danger, namely the risk of bloodshed by the techno-industrial society to which he opposes the moral rigor of Piero Gobetti which refers to civil commitment.

Seborga also approached poetry, his first collection of poems was published in 1965 with the title "Se avessi una canzone", is dominated by the sea, the sun, the wind, rich olive border valleys and vineyards as wild as its inhabitants.

He participated in the political and musical experience of the Turin group Cantacronache, which offered an alternative to commercial ditties by putting in music some of his poems.

== Literary and theatrical works ==
- 5 novelle del viver moderno (Guido Hess il caso di B. Calderini), Gulia 1935
- 25 aprlile – La resistenza in piemonte (Guido Hess: Rossa di sole bandiera che vive) Orma Editrice Torino 1946
- L'uomo di Camporosso, Editions Mondadori 1948 – Finalist for the Premio Viareggio and nominated for the Premio Strega (1949).
- Il figlio di Caino, Editions Mondadori 1949.
- La tua donna, segnalato Premio Riccione '50
- Spartaco vuoi essere libero? – Drama in 3 acts with Umberto Mastroianni (1951)
- Licia pesca a ponenete- theatre play (1947)
- Amori capitali – Editions Rebellato (1959), finalist Premio Viareggio 1959.
- Gli innocenti – Editions Ceschina (1961), finalist Premio Viareggio 1961, best book of Liguria for 2006.
- Ergastolo – 1963.
- Se avessi una canzone – Poems – Edizioni dell'albergo 1964.
- Maona – Drama published in the magazine Il Dramma 1965.
- Il Cristo degli abissi – Drama in 3 acts published in the magazine Il Dramma 1965.
- Parigi due amori – Editions dell’Albero1968
- Occhio folle occhio lucido – Editions Ceschina 1968.
- Seborga, poesie inedite – Editions Martano 1970.
- Vivere e disvivere – Editions Carte segrete 1973
- Sangue e cerebrum – Editions Sugarco 1980

== Bibliography ==
- Hess et, Laura (2009). Guido Seborga. Scritti, immagini, lettere. Spoon River. ISBN 9788889509777.
- Novelli, Massimo (2003). L'uomo di Bordighera : indagine su Guido Seborga. Spoon River. ISBN 978-8886906807.
