= Gobetti =

Gobetti is an Italian surname. Notable people with the surname include:

- Ada Gobetti (1902–1968), Italian teacher, journalist and anti-fascist
- Giuseppe Gobetti (1909–?), Italian footballer
- Piero Gobetti (1901–1926), Italian journalist, intellectual and anti-fascist
