= Luisa Monti Sturani =

Italian writer (1911–2002)

Luisa Monti Sturani (6 August 1911 - 10 June 2002) was an Italian anti-fascist writer and teacher.

== Biography ==
Luisa Monti Sturani was a teacher in literature at secondary schools. She wrote many works related to the Italian resistance as a witness of the opposition in a fascist and Nazi regime.

Daughter of Augusto Monti and Camilla Dezzani, she was born in Chieri the following year of their marriage. She was nicknamed by her father Luisotta, and became in turn a teacher and writer following in her father's footsteps. Leo Pestelli, a journalist critical of La Stampa, on April 16, 1954, published on p. 2 of the newspaper a review on a book by Luisa.

On March 2, 1935, she married Mario Sturani, painter and ceramist, exponent of the Futurist movement from a young age. Her husband was a political commissar of the 3rd Brigade Matteotti, one of the Italian partisan brigades.

She died in Turin in June 2002 at the age of 91.

== Publications ==
=== Works by Luisa Sturani ===
- Luisa Monti Sturani, Antologia della Resistenza, in Le relayette, Edizioni Gruppo Abele, 2012 [1951], ISBN 978-88-6579-035-9
- Luisa Monti Sturani I Partigiani del Ciar, illustrations by Marcello Peola, Paravia, 1965
- Luisa Monti Sturani, Fazzoletti rossi, Cultura Sociale, 1954. In 1957 it was translated into Russian under the title Красные галстуки at the Detgiz publishing house.
- Luisa Monti Sturani, Una storia vera, Edizioni A.N.P.I., 1953.
- Luisa Monti Sturani, Il nuovo mago sapere: sussidiario per la scuola elementare, Orizzonte, 1952
- Luisa Monti Sturani, Ora è sempre resistenza, ANPI Torino, 1954
- Luisa Sturani, Elements of Latin and logical analysis. Per la Scuola media, Loecher, 2003
- From 1952 until 1954, she published regularly, around fifty short stories about the Pioniere
- Also twenty works specifically scholastic, in first grade secondary schools, written by Luisa Monti Sturani, were donated to the Tancredi Foundation of Barolo by her son Enrico Sturani.

=== Luisa Sturani works with other authors ===
- Luisa Monti Sturani and Enrico Sturani, Grammatica e vita, Loescher, 1999,
- Luisa Monti Sturani and Mario Sturani, L'elefante con le brache, Novecento, 1991
- Luisa Monti Luisa and Enrico Sturani, La terra dell'uomo, Principato Editore, 1972
- Luisa Monti Sturani and various authors,. Quando si combatteva per la libertà, Edizioni A.N.P.I., 1972, pp. 145 - 168.
- For the Pioniere de l’Unità she wrote the short stories A Partisan Schoolgirl and The Popular Uprising in 1964.

=== Works about Luisa Sturani ===
- Augusto Monti, Lettere a Luisotta, Enaudi, 1977,
- Alfredo Pasquali, Luisa Sturani, in Radio CittàFujiko, 23 March 2018

== Historical studies ==
The Piero Gobetti's Study Centre, has dedicated two archival funds in memory of Luisa Monti Sturani: the "Augusto Monti and Luisa Sturani Fund" and the "Luisa Monti and Mario Sturani Fund".

- The Augusto Monti and Luisa Sturani Fund collects the correspondence between father and daughter during the period of detention of Augusto Monti, in February 1934 when he was arrested and sentenced five years of imprisonment by a special fascist court, first the Roman prison of Regina Coeli and then from the Civitavecchia Penitentiary, until he was finally released in February 1939.
- The Luisa Monti and Mario Sturani Fund, whereas, collects working materials related to the publication of two texts by Luisa Sturani: Antologia della Resistenza, Centro del libro popolare, Roma 1951 and Fazzoletti Rossi, ed. di Cultura sociale, Roma 1954. It is kept there with correspondence with Tommaso Fiore, Norberto Bobbio, Vittorio Foa, Camilla Ravera and others. We find the editorial material for the publication of the volume: Augusto Monti, Lettere a Luisotta, Einaudi, Torino 1977. Completing the material fund inherent in the military and political activity of Luisa Monti Sturani's husband.
- The Luisa Monti Sturani Fund at the Tancredi Foundation of Barolo in Turin collects all her books, including school textbooks and a copy of Fazzoletti Rossi in Russian published in the Soviet Union in 1957.
