= Riccardo Bauer =

Italian journalist and politician (1896–1982)

- Born: 6 January 1896; Milan
- Died: 15 October 1982 (aged 86); Milan
- Occupation: Journalist
- Years active: 1920s–1969
- Known for: Cofounder of Giustizia e Libertà; Founder of Il Caffè
- Parent(s): Francesco Bauer; Giuseppina Cairoli

Riccardo Bauer (6 January 1896 – 15 October 1982) was an Italian anti-fascist journalist and political figure. He was one of the early Italians who fought against Benito Mussolini's rule. Due to his activities Bauer was imprisoned for a long time and was freed only after the collapse of the Fascist rule in 1943.

== Biography ==
Riccardo Bauer was born in Milan on 6 January 1896. His parents were Francesco who was from Bohemia and Giuseppina Cairoli. In 1922 he began to collaborate with La Rivoluzione Liberale, an anti-Fascist magazine by Piero Gobetti. In July 1924 he founded an anti-fascist magazine, Il Caffè, which existed until May 1925. In 1926 Bauer helped Filippo Turati's escape from Milan to Paris due to the oppression of the Fascist rule. The same year Bauer was arrested and was in prison for seven months. Then he was sentenced to two years of confinement first on the island of Ustica and then in Lipari between January and 10 April 1928. Back in Milan, Bauer resumed his activities and founded the Giustizia e Libertà movement with Ernesto Rossi which laid the basis of the Action Party. On 30 November 1930 Bauer, Ferruccio Parri and Umberto Ceva were arrested. Bauer was sentenced to 20 years in prison and was released only after the end of the Fascist rule on 25 July 1943.

In November 1943 Bauer was elected as a board member and the chairman of the board of the Action Party in the first convention held in Florence in secret. Bauer was one of the leaders of the armed Giustizia e Libertà units operating in Rome. Together with Giorgio Amendola and Sandro Pertini, he was part of its central military committee. Following the end of Fascist rule Bauer became one of the leading figures of the Action Party in Rome. He was president of the Humanitarian Society in Milan from 1950 to 1969. He died at a clinic in Milan on 15 October 1982.
