= Il Caffè (1924–1925) =

Italian political magazine (1924-1925)

- Editor: Riccardo Bauer
- Categories: Political magazine
- Frequency: Biweekly (July 1924–December 1924); Weekly (December 1924–May 1925)
- Founder: Riccardo Bauer
- Founded: 1924
- First issue: 1 July 1924
- Final issue: May 1925
- Country: Italy
- Based in: Milan
- Language: Italian

Il Caffè (Italian, 'The Coffeehouse') was an anti-Fascist Italian magazine which was published for a short period between 1924 and 1925 in Milan during the Fascist rule in Italy. Its title was a reference to an enlightenment publication with the same name, Il Caffè, which was also based in Milan and founded and edited by Alessandro and Pietro Verri from 1764 and 1766.

== History and profile ==
The first issue of Il Caffè appeared on 1 July 1924. The magazine was inspired from another anti-Fascist magazine, La Rivoluzione Liberale, which was published and edited by Piero Gobetti. Il Caffè was started as a biweekly publication, but from December 1924 its frequency was switched to weekly.

The founder and editor of the magazine which was based in Milan was Riccardo Bauer. Its sponsors were a group of intellectuals who were adhered to the principles of the democratic sovereignty and constitutional control of the government. Ettore Margadonna and Ferruccio Parri were two leading contributors of Il Caffè. Due to its anti-Fascist stance the magazine was continuously subject to the censorship of the Fascist authorities and was folded in May 1925.
