= Carlo Dell'Avalle =

Italian politician

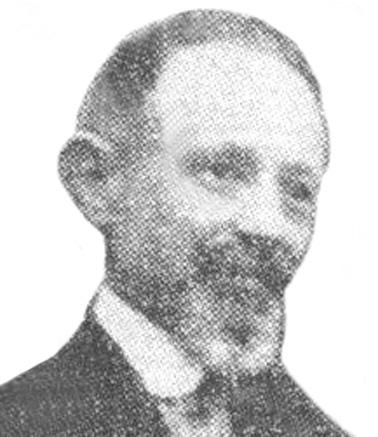
Carlo Dell'Avalle

Carlo Dell'Avalle (Milan, 24 April 1861 – 10 December 1917) was an Italian politician, and the first secretary of the Italian Socialist Party.

== Early career ==
Son of Nicola and Adelaide Giani, he ran away from home at the age of eleven to avoid his family's chosen career for him in the church, in the college of the Barnabites in Milan. He worked as a printer, accompanying his activity with political interests and union organization. Initially close to the republican movement, he eventually espoused socialist ideas which in those years were spreading with the development of Italian industry.

In 1882 he founded the "Società Genio e Lavoro", which brought together the main workers' organizations of the Milan, including the railway workers and the workers of Pirelli.

In August 1889 he founded the weekly L'Italia Operaia. In 1891, at the Italian workers congress of in Milan, he proposed the formation of a political party based on socialist ideas. This idea was welcomed by leading members of the movement, such as Filippo Turati and Antonio Maffi, who proposed the name of the Italian Workers' Party. Negotiations took place over the following months between a number of organisations, leading to the establishment of the Italian Party of Workers in Genoa in 1892. Dell'Avalle was appointed the first secretary of the new party.

== Activism in the 1890s ==
In 1894 he suffered the crackdown socialist militants following a government decree that dissolved their organizations. In early 1896 he was imprisoned for three months in Pallanza for publishing material expressing solidarity with the Fasci Siciliani. In July of the same year he presented the report on propaganda at the IV Socialist congress in Florence, and successfully worked to ensure that Lotta di Classe, the newspaper of which he was editor, became the official organ of the party. At the following PSI congress (Bologna, September 1897) he was re-elected, with Bertini and Dino Rondani, to the central office of the party.

He played an important role in the bloody events in Milan in May 1898 known as the Bava Beccaris massacre. On 6 May he obtained the release of two of the three Pirelli workers arrested for leafleting, but he his appeals for moderation did not prevent the rising tide of popular discontent becoming an open revolt, unleashing the ferocious repression against the uprisings. Wanted, he fled to Lugano and in July he was sentenced by default to fifteen years' imprisonment. He returned from Italian-speaking Switzerland at the end of 1901, when the Milan court of appeal declared his sentence had lapsed.

== Activism in the 1900s ==
Dell’Avalle served as secretary of the Chamber of Labour of Lecco until 1905. In 1906 he assumed the same position in the Chamber of Milan and in this way opened the work of the VI congress of the resistance (Genoa, September 1906) that was to see the foundation of the General Confederation of Labour (CGdL). Whether or not the Milan Chamber of Labor should join the CGdL was the cause of controversy in the Milanese labor movement, which would last for his entire secretariat. In 1911 he left the chamber secretariat to become administrator of the CGdL. He held various other positions including the chairmanship of the weekly La Battaglia proletaria, the organ of the Milan Chamber of Labour, and represented the CGdL in The Humanitarian Society.

He wrote for or collaborated in the production of many publications: the weekly Il Pensiero riformista, Il Tipografo (1888-1894), Avanti! (organ of the Socialist Typographical Union, 1893-1894), Il Traniviere (1907-1909) and others, including Baluardo (1917), a newspaper of the autonomous socialist groups, close to Mussolini's positions.

Carlo Dell’Avalle is buried in the Cimitero Monumentale di Milano.
