= Giovanni Romano (architect) =

Italian architect (1905–1990)

- Born: 5 December 1905; Acqui Terme, Province of Alessandria, Kingdom of Italy
- Died: 15 October 1990 (aged 84); Milan, Lombardy, Italy
- Education: Polytechnic University of Milan
- Occupations: Architect, architecture critic

Giovanni Romano (5 December 1905 – 15 October 1990) was an Italian architect. He was part of a group of rationalist architects from Milan that introduced the principles of the Modern Movement to Italy. Among his main works are the Swiss Center in Milan and the headquarters of the Humanitarian Society.

== Career ==
Romano, who graduated in 1928 in architecture from the Polytechnic University of Milan, established important collaborations and friendships early in his career, including with Ignazio Gardella. He became involved with magazines such as Casabella and met figures like Giuseppe Pagano and Edoardo Persico. He participated in numerous competitions and exhibitions, such as the 6th Milan Triennial with Gardella and Franco Albini in 1936.

In the final years of World War II, he joined the Italian resistance movement (1943–1945). After the war, Romano was active in the modern architecture scene, becoming a member of CIAM and Movimento di Studi per l'Architettura (MSA), contributing to projects like the Reconstruction Plan for Milan and the QT8 neighborhood. He also participated in the competition for Milan's Central Business District.

In Milan, Romano most notably designed the Swiss Center, with Armin Meili, and the headquarters of the Humanitarian Society. In the 1960s, he was also involved in the design of the Genoa Courthouse.

== Works (selection) ==
- Elementary school in the Malpensata district of Lecco, with Paolo Clausetti (1932)
- Swiss School of Milan, with Aldo Lucchini and Antonio Maiocchi (1937)
- New headquarters of the Humanitarian Society in Milan (1947–57)
- Swiss Center of Milan, with Armin Meili (1947–52)
- Church of Santa Maria Giuseppa Rossello in Savona, with Cesare Fera (1958–60)
- Expressway "Sopraelevata" in Genoa, with Fabrizio de Miranda (1961–64)
- Genoa Courthouse, with Luciano Mascia, Giorgio Olcese, and Giulio Zappa (1962–66)
- School Center in La Spezia, with Aldo Favini (1966–82)
