= Polo del '900 =

Cultural centre of Turin

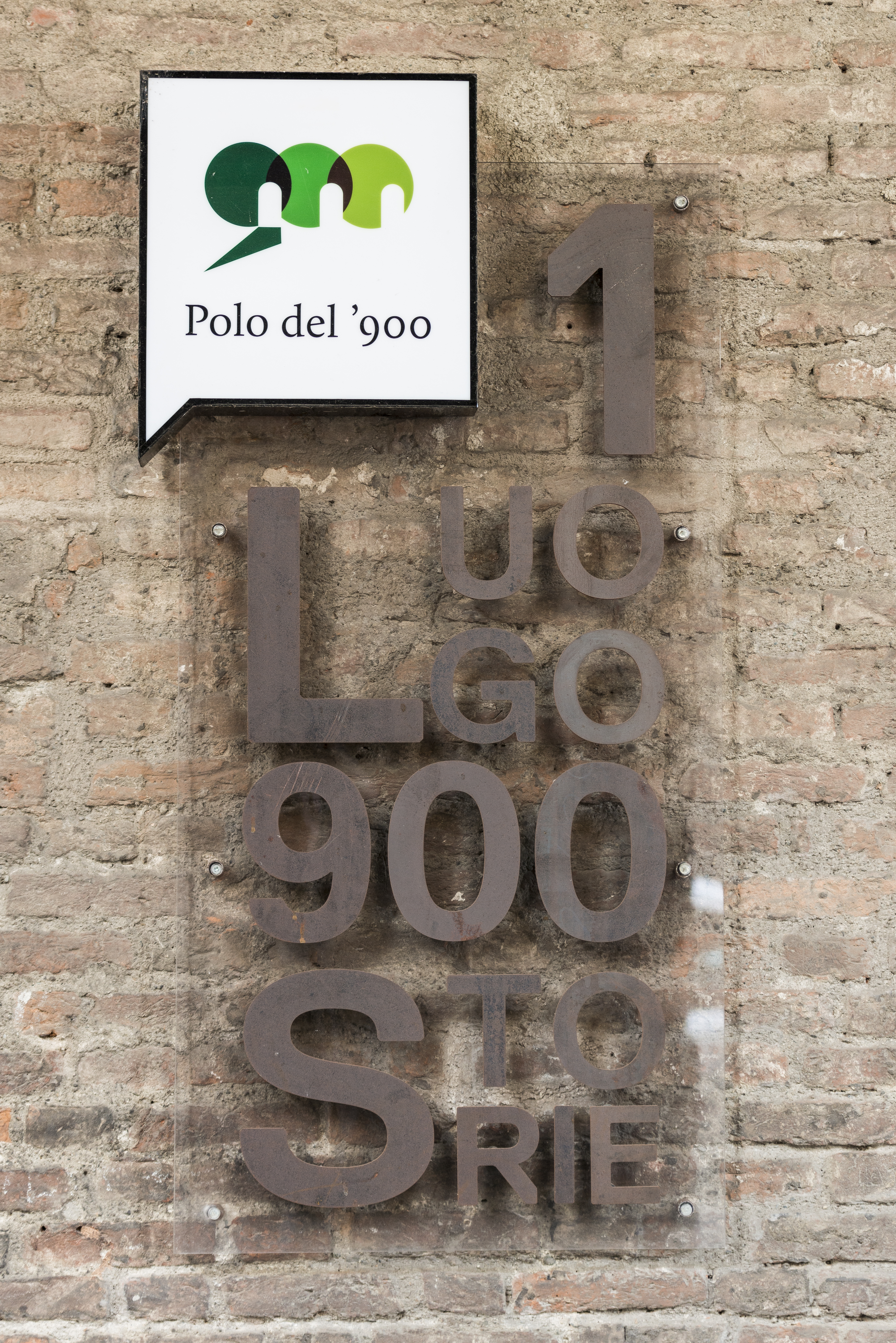
- Formation: 2016
- Purpose: educational
- Location: Turin, Italy
- Coordinates: 45.07636752925151°N 7.675186697734261°E
- Leader: Sergio Soave (president), Alessandro Bollo (director)
- Website: www.polodel900.it

The Polo del '900 is a cultural centre of Turin, that hosts the seats of 26 partner institutions. The centre is housed in the so-called Quartieri Militari (military quarters) of the Quadrilatero Romano, a juvarrian compound, in the Palazzi San Celso and San Daniele, built on the design of Filippo Juvarra, which house the library, the archive, the areas for events, exhibitions and performances, classrooms and the permanent exhibitions of the Museo diffuso della Resistenza, della deportazione, della guerra, dei diritti e della libertà (Museum of the Resistance).

The Polo is open to citizen and particularly targeted to younger generations and new citizens.

== History ==
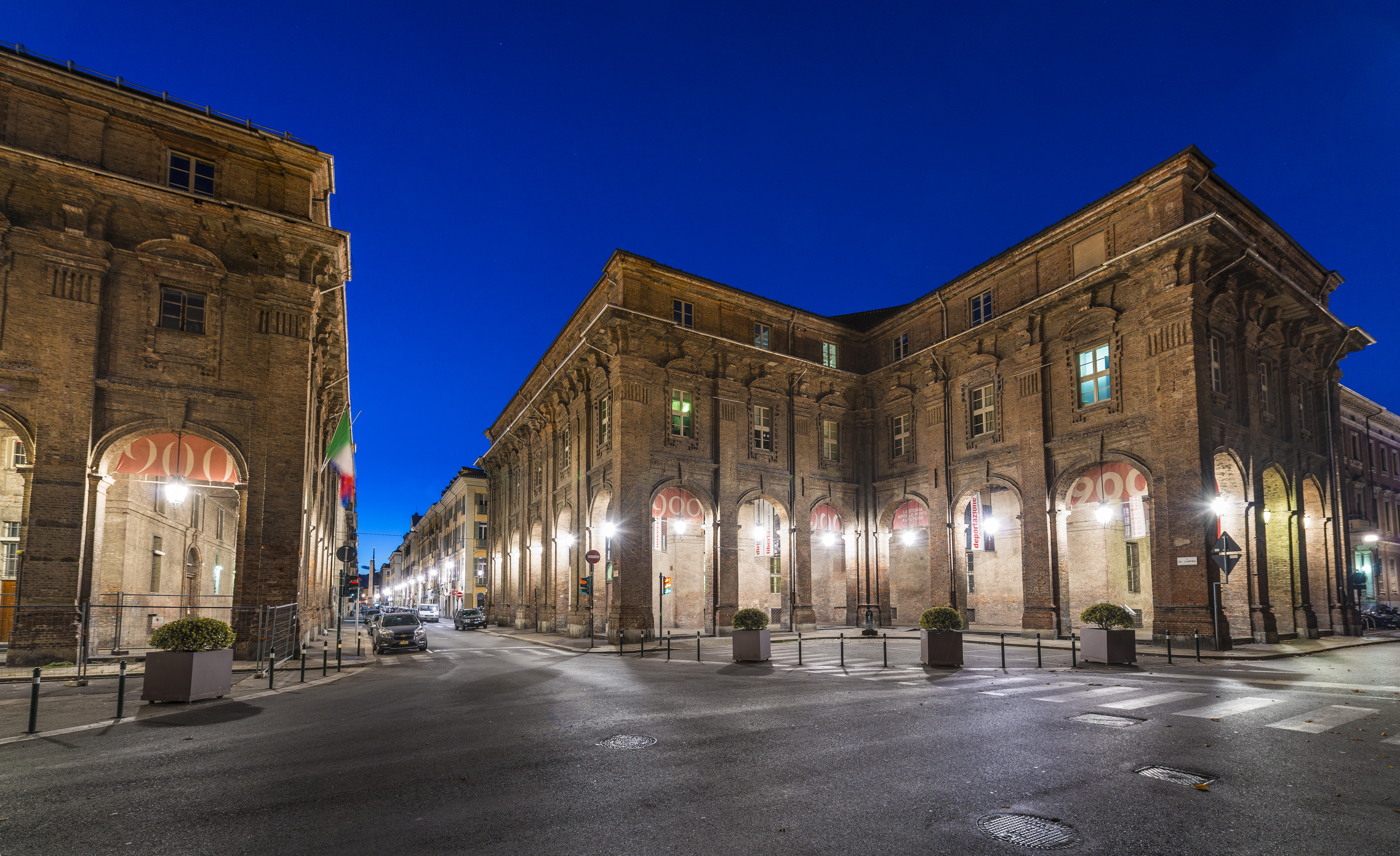
the palaces San Celso e San Daniele which host the Polo del '900

The Polo del '900 was born in 2016 from a project between the institutions and the cultural associations of Turin particularly focused on the 20th century. Behind this there is a social, economic, political, historical, cultural, and popular programme for the education and social development about the main themes of contemporary history. The Polo shows itself as a unique space, where 26 partner institutions live and work in the mutual respect for each other's cultural identities. The Foundation Polo del '900 safeguards the cultural autonomy, promoting their integration and development, in a cultural and civic centre.

The founding partners of the Foundation Polo del '900 were Piedmont Region, the City of Turin and the Compagnia di San Paolo, which contributed to the restoration works with €5 million and for the set-ups with €2 million.

At its birth, the Polo was considered one of the major European foundations for documentation, archival and book heritage.

== Features ==
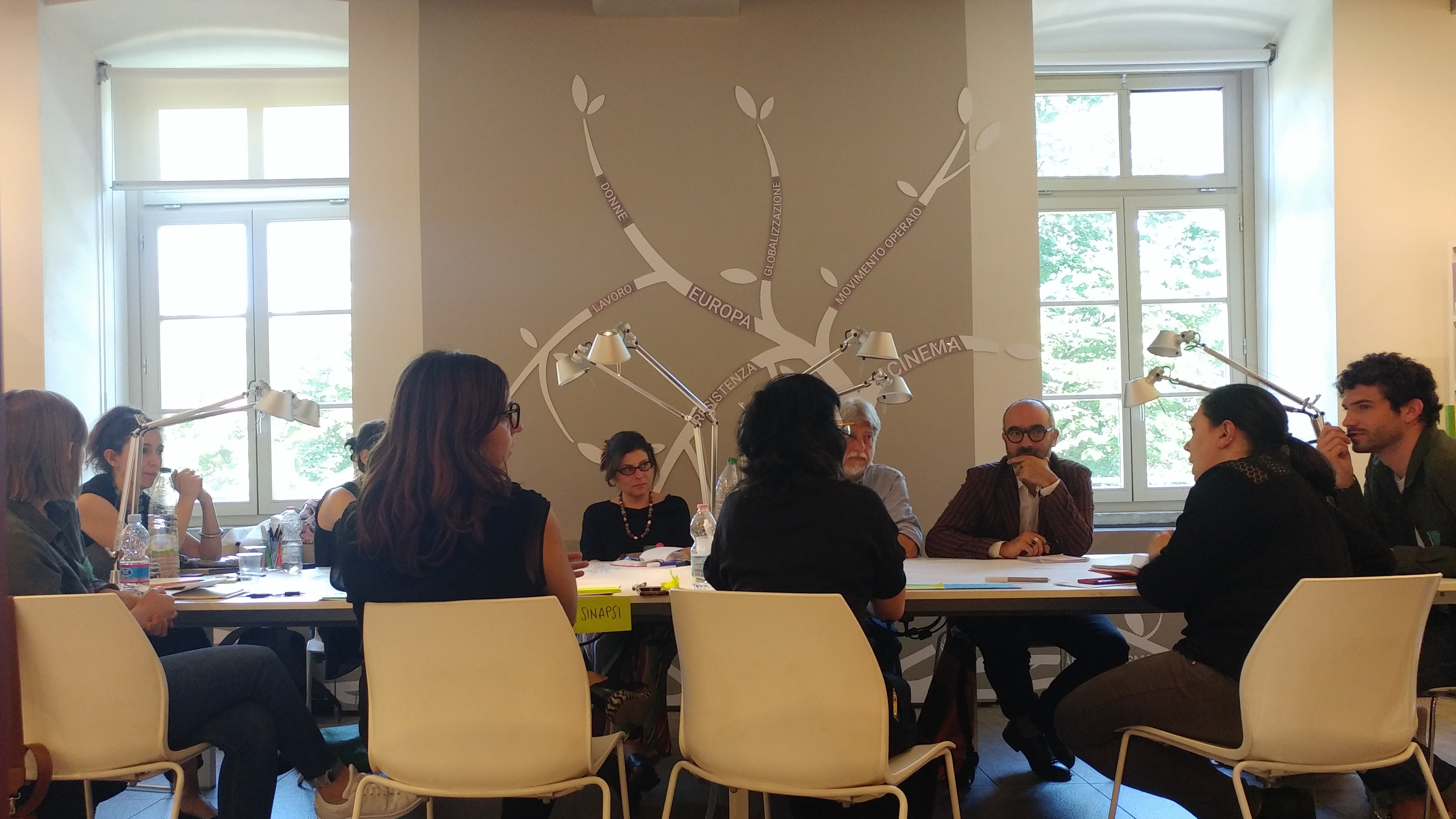
L'albero delle parole chiave in Sala Lettura

The Polo del '900 shows itself as a common property and an institution with a multifunctional vocation, its management model is based on cooperation and exchange of ideas and skills. You can access the areas thanks to a free membership, and it is opened all day, meeting the need of the citizens. The areas for the public are wide and multi-purpose.

The features of the Polo del '900 are the hospitality, the cohabitation and the promotion, and these come to light from the various cultural planning e by the presence of 26 institutions and cultural associations that promote projects, through their heritage. Based on values as hospitality, inclusion e participation, the foundation has a disability friendly, kids and family friendly and dog friendly policy. The aim of the Polo del '900 is to allow the growth, the development and the spread of civic awareness, becoming a place where you can think about contemporary themes, as the Democracy, the Citizenship and the labour law, speaking to younger generations and new citizens.

== Headquarters ==
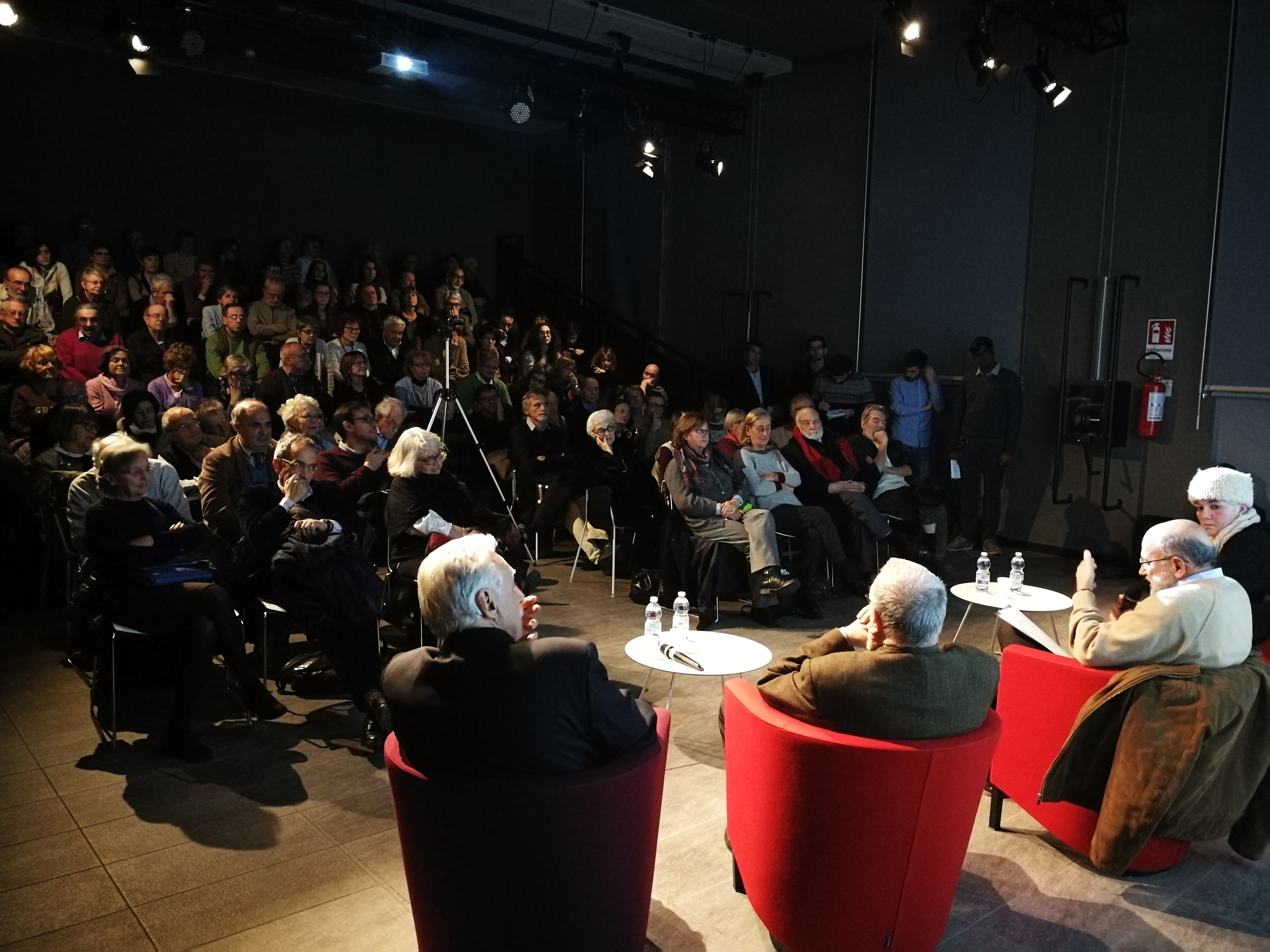
Event in room '900

The seats of the Polo del '900 are Palazzi San Daniele and San Celso, located in the juvarrian compound of Quartieri Militari. You can enter the Polo through two entrances: Via del Carmine 14 (Palazzo San Daniele) and Corso Valdocco 4/A (Palazzo San Celso). The areas of the cultural centre cover over 8 thousand square meters of restored buildings and they are open to everybody.

The palace San Daniele hosts the Salotto '900, a multi-use area dedicated to meeting, free time and exchange of opinions, located next to the entrance hall, after the reception. There are three multi-use rooms, between the ground floor and the basement, that can host different kind of events: the Sala Voltoni, the Sala '900 and the Classroom. The ground floor houses also an area dedicated to the kid-friendly workshops and events. On the first floor you can find the Reading Room, a space to study, work and read, and there are more than ten thousand books organized by themes. The other floors house the offices of the partner institutions of the Polo del '900: ANCR – Associazione nazionale combattenti e reduci; ANED – Associazione nazionale ex deportati nei campi nazisti; ANPI – Associazione Nazionale Partigiani d'Italia; ANPPIA-Associazione Nazionale Perseguitati Politici Italiani Antifascisti; AVL – Associazione Volontari Libertà del Piemonte; Centro Studi Piero Gobetti; FIAP – Federazione italiana delle associazioni partigiane; Fondazione Donat-Cattin; Fondazione Istituto Piemontese Antonio Gramsci; Fondazione Vera Nocentini; ISMEL – Istituto per la Memoria e la Cultura del Lavoro, Istituto di Studi Storici Gaetano Salvemini; Rete Italiana di Cultura Popolare, Unione Culturale Franco Antonicelli. During the summer 2019, the courtyard San Daniele was inaugurated, and this area is dedicated to outdoor events.

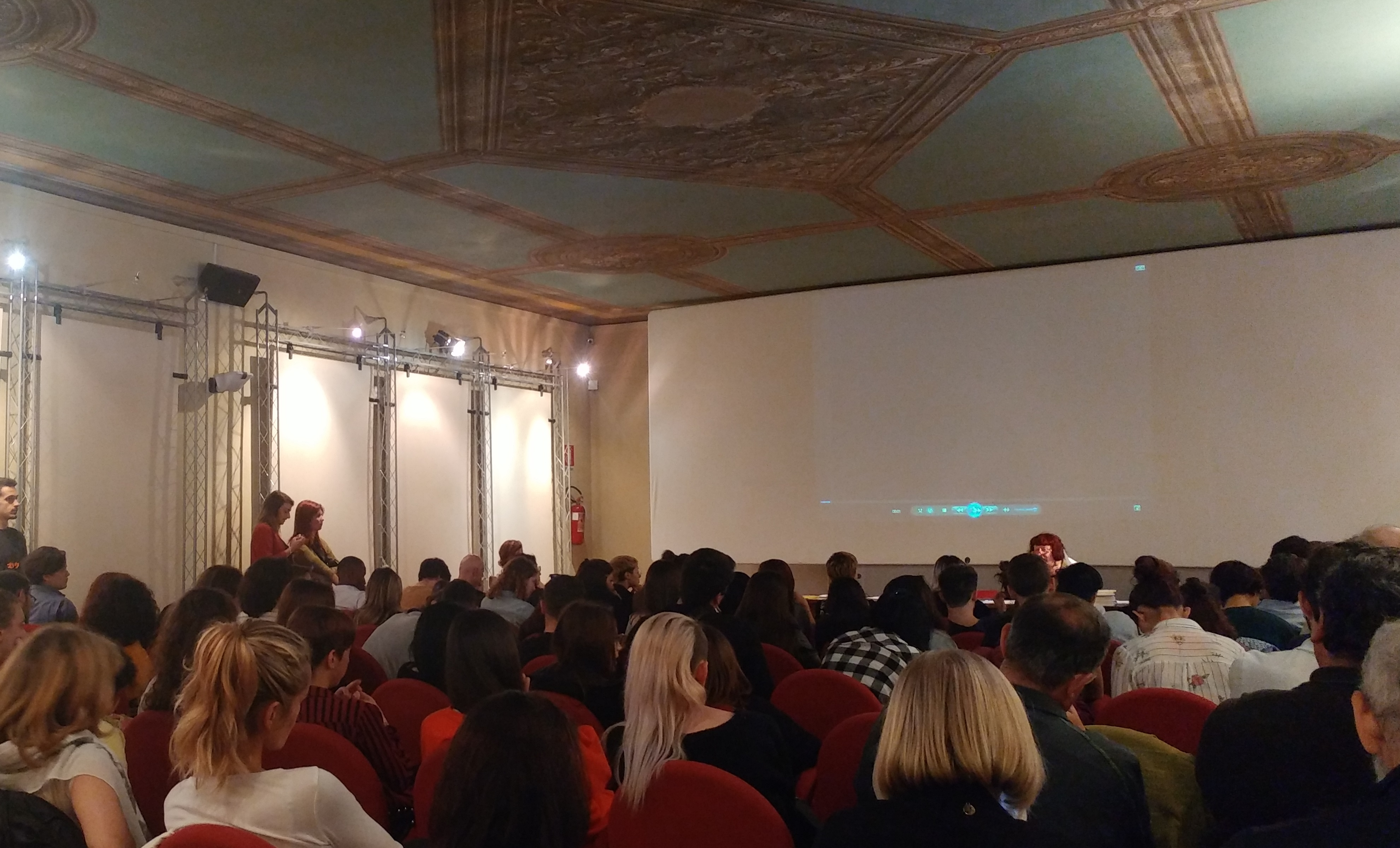
Sala conferenze e proiezioni

In Palazzo San Celso, you can find the permanent exhibition Torino 1938–1948. Dalle leggi razziali alla Costituzione of the Museo Diffuso della Resistenza that remembers the daily life during World War II, Operation Achse, the Italian resistance movement and the return of the democracy, thanks to interactive installations. You can also visit the Air raid shelter located 12 meters deep.

On the ground floor there are the ticket office of the museum, its entrance is in Corso Valdocco 4/A, and the courtyard that hosts la panchina rosa triangolare of Corrado Levi, a work of art dedicated to Persecution of homosexuals in Nazi Germany made for the contest organized by the City of Bologna in 1989 and donated to the Museo Diffuso della Resistenza in the occasion of International Holocaust Remembrance Day in 2013. The work represented the first monument that the city of Torino dedicates to the homosexuals of the Nazism. From the courtyard you can entre in the Room Post-it where the visitors are invited to write their thoughts.

On the first floor of the palace there are the Mini Cinema, the multimedia laboratories (ANCR), the offices of the Centro Internazionale di Studi Primo Levi. On the second floor there are the Conference and Screening Room, an elegant hall that hosts different kind of events, the Galleria delle Immagini, an exhibiting space for exhibitions and installations, the Video Room e the offices of the Archivio Nazionale Cinematografico della Resistenza (ANCR) and the offices of the Foundation Polo del '900.

On the third floor there are the Reading Room, the library specialized in the history of the Anti-fascism and of the Resistance, the Room Memoria delle Alpi and the offices of the Istituto Piemontese per la Storia della Resistenza e della Società Contemporanea Giorgio Agosti.

The Polo del '900 has other areas for the services: in the Casa Gobetti, in via Fabro 6 in Turin, historical seat of the Centro Studi Piero Gobetti since 1961, the seat of the Fondo Tullio De Mauro della Rete Italiana di Cultura Popolare, in via Arsenale 27 in Turin and the historical seat of the Unione Culturale Franco Antonicelli, in via Cesare Battisti 4 in Turin.

== Library ==
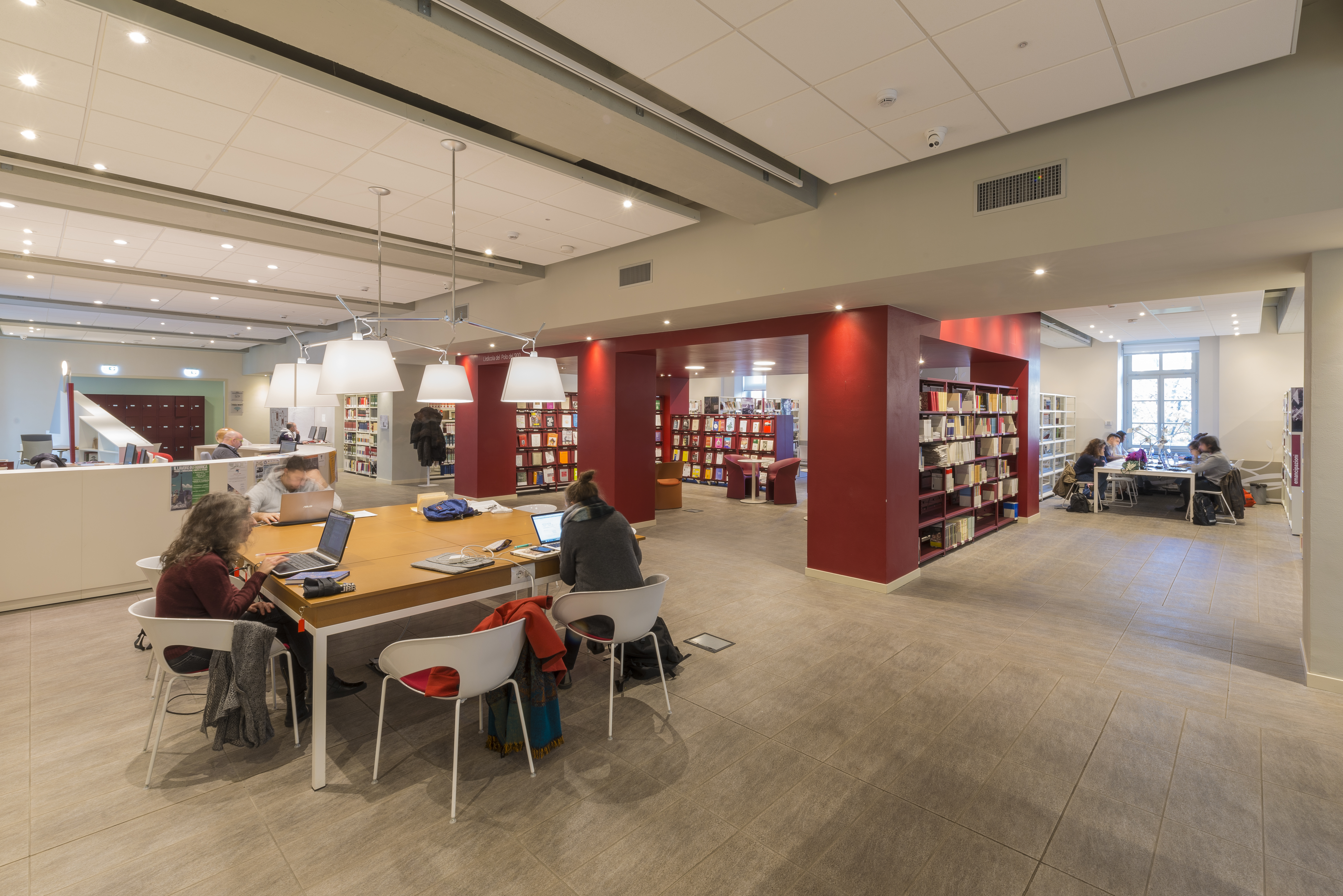
Reading Room of the library of the Polo

The library of the Polo del '900 was born from the union of the book heritages of the partner institutions, which have made available their book collections to the public. The documentary heritage is specialized in the history of the 20th century, both Italian and international.

The Polo makes available a lot of 300,000 books about the great historical, civil and social themes of the 20th century, through the open shelving in the spaces of the Reading Room and the access to the publication in the depot, available on request. It is possible to do research thanks to the qualified staff, the online bibliographic catalogue and, in integrated research mode with archival heritage, from #9centro. In the same area there us the newspaper library, which stores more than two hundred newspapers. There is also a kids area, with a library with books for children from 0 to 11 years.

== Archives ==
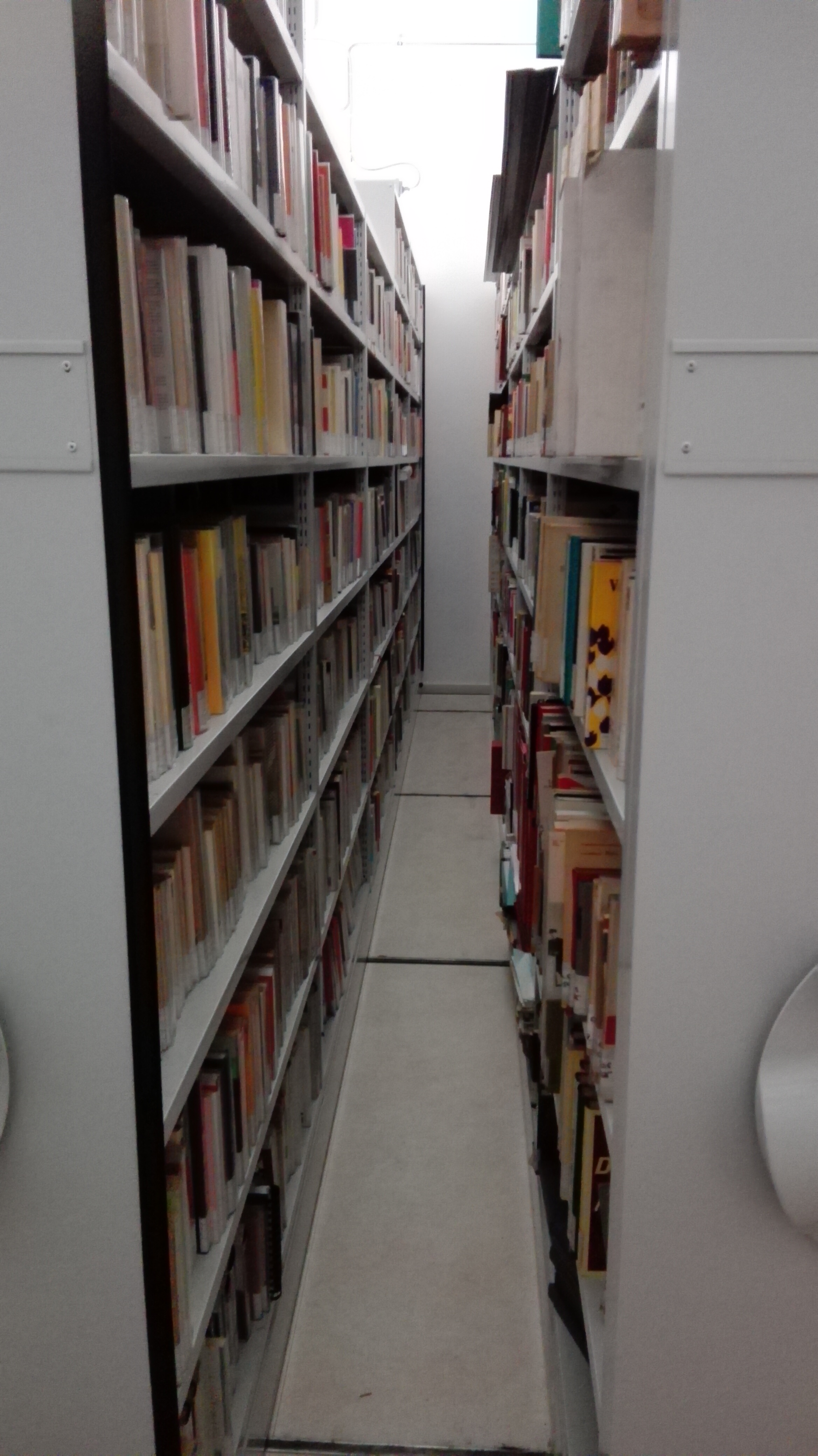
Archives of the Polo del '900

The archive of the Polo del '900 stores 840 archive collections, 127,600 photos and 20,800 posters, for a total of 9 km of documents. The research of these documents is possible thanks to digital and paper tools and the help of the staff.

The online consultation includes 400,000 digitalized documents. You can consult fragile material, as photos and large format prints, audiovisual and sound resources. The Archivio Nazionale Cinematografico della Resistenza (ANCR) makes available a multimedia room with workstations for the access to the archive's database. Upon request to the staff, you can photocopy the documents or duplicate them in digital format. There are more than 16,000 movies available for the consultation in different formats, with over 4,000 video and 2,500 audio hours of multimedia material that you can consult online.

In addition to the material of the partner institutions, the audiovisual archive houses the documentaries made by the Film Commission Torino Piemonte during the Piemonte Doc Film Sound, which are available for the consultation in section "cinema".

=== 9centro ===
9centro, showed for the first time in June 2016, is a digital platform that collects the cultural and archival heritage of the partner authorities of the Polo. There are thousands of photos, posters, videos and birth and biographic records. The project allows the users to explore the history of all documents and sources, divided by topics. You can visit the online archival database and consult every single document, until its analytic description, and their digital image. The consulting of online archive is free and does not require registration.

=== ArchoS ===
ArchoS (Integrated System of the Archive's Catalogue) is the integrated system of cataloguing, archive and research, made by the contribute of Compagnia di San Paolo and the Istituto Piemontese per la Storia della Resistenza e della società contemporanea "Giorgio Agosti" promoted the development of the system. The digital archive is based on different kind of documents belonged to the archive heritage of the institutions. It is divided into two areas: biographies and met-archive.

The area of the metarchives has a multi-catalogue structure that allows the user to consult the archives through three ways:

- Exploring the hierarchical structure of the archives, organized in levels.
- Browsing the online catalogue, which stores all kinds of digital documents in compressed format and availables in the original format. The clips are organized by type of document, that you can consult browsing the album and access to the description file. The high-definition catalogue is available for the consultation only in the study room.
- Making textual research through the simple search, made in the index, and the advanced search, which allows the user to consult the institutions by specific areas of every archive's level and type of document.

== Workshops ==
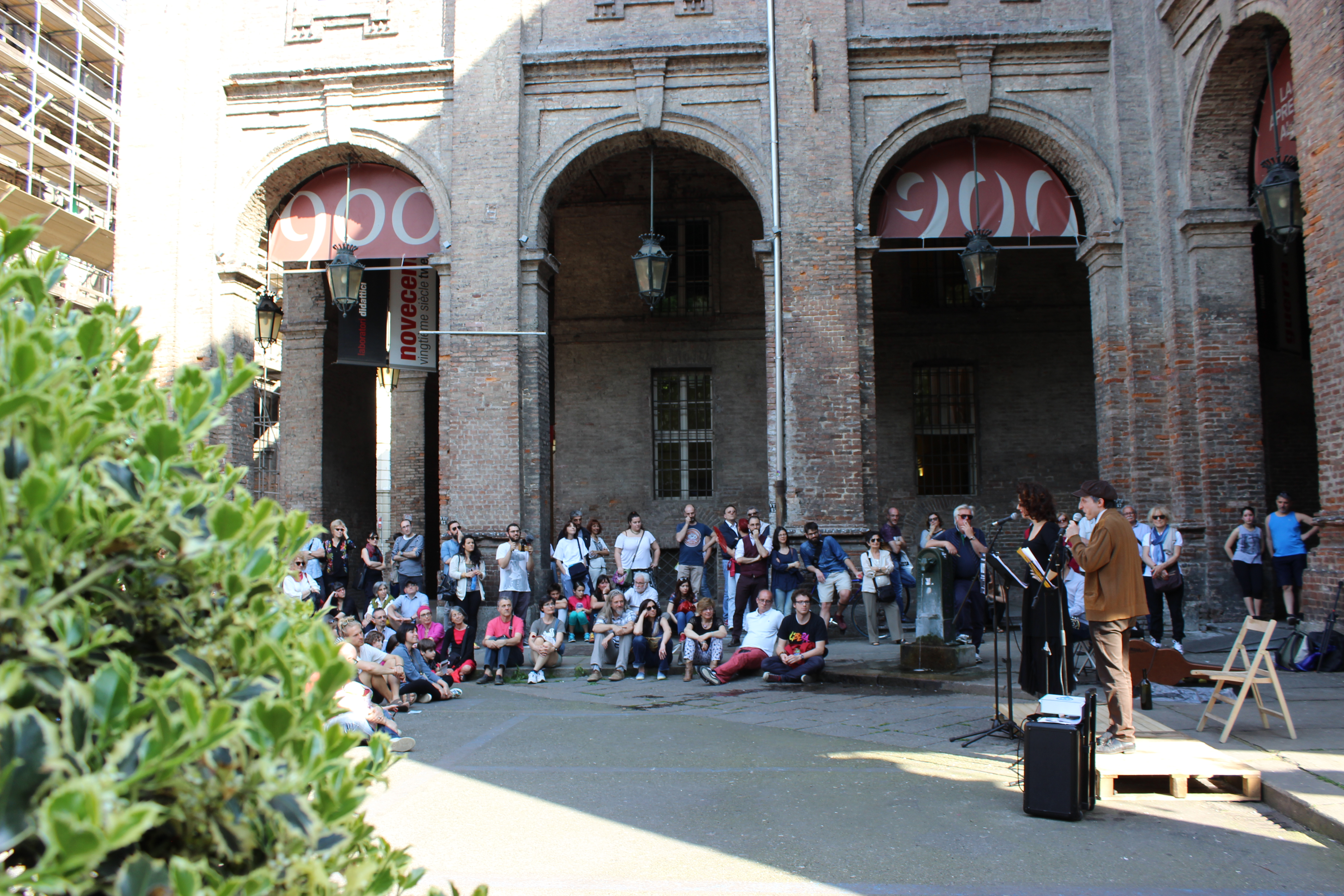
Cultural event in progress all'outside of the Palazzi Juvarriani

The polo del ‘900 organizes many workshops for different types of publics, becoming a permanent lab of planning, participation and citizen growth. An area is dedicated to children, teenagers, primary and junior high school classrooms, with different contents and methods for every age. The staff and the experts of education, with the help of the partner institutions, organize integrating projects in traditional and interactive formats, which encourage children and teenagers to understand history, culture, and documentary sources. For the families and the children are organized workshops about the development and the promotion of the cultural heritage, for example labs and animated reading. For the adults and the citizens are organized workshops of education, research, guided tours, didactic meeting and debate about themes as the cultural promotion, linking the history of 20th century and current days. For the experts of cultural sector, such as librarians and archivists, are organized training courses with extern partnerships and collaborations. The Polo del '900 houses and organizes in its spaces temporary exhibitions, installations and exhibits.

== Rewards ==
- Premio Cultura di Gestione 2019 IX EDIZIONE – 12 June 2019. Promoted by Federculture, Agis, Alleanza Cooperative Italiane Turismo e Beni Culturali, Forum Nazionale del Terzo Settore e ANCI with the aim to identify, reward and encourage the most innovative projects in cultural management for the local development through operations of territorial promotion, increase and development of the cultural offer, integrated promotion of cultural heritage, social cohesion, rearrangement of the services for the citizen, improvement of the public access. Motivation for the award: "The Polo del ‘900 is a model project of co-planning and collaboration with public and private institutions, with innovative management for the citizens and a modern cultural space realized "to link the past with the current days". For these reasons, the project is particularly innovative in the engagement of the public in a cultural vision that links the important historical heritage of the past century with the current days, creating new human and creative capital.
- Premio Gianluca Spina for the Innovazione Digitale nei Beni e Attività Culturali 2020 – III EDIZIONE – 27 MAGGIO 2020 Promoted by the Osservatorio Innovazione Digitale nei Beni e Attività Culturali del Politecnico di Milano for the Italian cultural institutions which have realized important projects of digital innovation in the internal processes or in the offer to the public. The Polo is awarded for the project 9centR0 – The digital hub of the archives of the Polo del ‘900.
- Admission in the platform Canopy Unesco 2021 World Heritage Canopy is a platform full of strategies and innovative activities that integrate the preservation of the heritage with the sustainable development. Through case histories and practical examples, the platform wants to inspire the local actions that contribute and adjust to the main global appointments such as the World Heritage convention of the 1972, Recommendation on the historical urban landscape and the 2030 Agenda for Sustainable Development. The Polo del '900 is one of the top 11 institutions in the world chosen by Unesco for the platform World Heritage Canopy.

== Partner institutions ==
The partner institutions of the Polo del '900 are 26, among institutions and associations:

- ANCR – Archivio Nazionale Cinematografico della Resistenza
- ANCR – Associazione Nazionale Combattenti e Reduci
- Arci Torino aps
- Associazione Culturale Twitteratura
- ANED – Associazione Nazionale Ex Deportati nei Campi Nazisti
- ANPI – Associazione Nazionale Partigiani d'Italia
- ANPPIA – Associazione Nazionale Perseguitati Politici Italiani Antifascisti
- AVGD – Associazione Venezia Giulia Dalmazia
- AVL – Associazione Volontari per la Libertà
- Centro Culturale Pier Giorgio Frassati
- Centro Internazionale di Studi Primo Levi
- Centro Studi Piero Gobetti
- CESI - Centro Einstein di Studi Internazionali sul Federalismo, la Pace, la Politica del Territorio
- CIAN – Archivio Nazionale Cinema d'Impresa
- FIAP – Federazione Italiana delle Associazioni Partigiane
- Fondazione Bottari Lattes
- Fondazione Carlo Donat-Cattin
- Fondazione Giovanni Goria
- Fondazione Istituto Piemontese Antonio Gramsci
- Fondazione Vera Nocentini
- ISMEL – Istituto per la Memoria e la Cultura del Lavoro, dell'Impresa e dei Diritti Sociali
- Istituto di studi storici Gaetano Salvemini
- ISTORETO- Istituto Piemontese per la Storia della Resistenza e della Società Contemporanea Giorgio Agosti
- Museo Diffuso della Resistenza, della Deportazione, della Guerra, dei Diritti e della Libertà
- Rete Italiana di Cultura Popolare
- Unione Culturale Franco Antonicelli.
