= Tommaso Fiore =

Italian writer and politician (1884–1973)

- Born: 7 March 1884
- Died: 4 June 1973 (aged 89)
- Citizenship: Italian
- Occupations: Teacher, writer, politician
- Writing career
- Language: Italian
- Genre: Essay
- Subjects: Land reform, politics, socialism
- Notable works: Un popolo di formiche; Il cafone all'inferno
- Notable awards: Viareggio Prize
- Website: tommasofiore.it

Tommaso Fiore (7 March 1884 – 4 June 1973) was an Italian meridionalist writer and a socialist intellectual and politician. He is known for his attention and his descriptions and studies on the inhumane conditions of Southern Italian and often specifically Apulian peasants at that time. He is also known for his Viareggio Prize-winning book Un popolo di formiche ("A people of ants"). In the 1920s, he was appointed as mayor (Italian: sindaco) of his hometown Altamura. During the twenty-year period of the Italian Fascist era, he strenuously opposed the regime before being sent into internal exile in 1942 and then being jailed in 1943.

== Life ==
And everywhere walls and walls, not ten, not twenty, but more, many more, horizontally aligned on the flanks of each relief, even a few meters away, to contain the ground, to collect and hold it among so much limestone. You may wonder how those people managed to dig and align so much stone. I believe this work would have frightened a people of giants. This is the most rugged and stony Murgia; ... nothing more than the industriousness of a people of ants was needed in order to accomplish this massive work.

— Tommaso Fiore, Un popolo di formiche (1952)

Tommaso Fiore was born in a working-class family on 7 March 1884. After completing higher education in a seminary school located in Conversano (as it was normal at that time for gifted students who couldn't afford public high schools), he studied classical literature at university and then he taught inside Italian classical lyceum schools. His interests were mostly focused on the poverty of Southern Italy's peasants, and he struggled with his thoughts to find a solution to Southern Italy's economic failure (in Italian, such scholars are called meridionalisti). He was also a strenuous socialist, and he always fought for the Independence and federalism of Southern Italy. He also studied poverty and other issues related to Southern Italy's peasants. In the 1920s, he became mayor of Altamura, his hometown, and he was a courageous opponent of fascism. He was sent into internal exile in 1942 and then jailed in 1943 because of his intense propaganda against fascism.

On 19 August 1909, he also joined the Italian Freemasonry, and he was appointed to the Masonic lodge number 1799 located in Altamura. On 7 February 1915, he was appointed as Master Mason.

He collaborated with the Italian newspaper La Rivoluzione liberale whose chief editor was Piero Gobetti, and with the newspaper Quarto Stato founded by Pietro Nenni and Carlo Rosselli, where he explained his ideas about socialist reformation of Southern Italy.

On 28 July 1943, he lost his son Graziano in the massacre of via Niccolò dell'Arca, in Bari, carried out by fascists. In the aftermath of World War II, he was appointed as Latin grammar and literature teacher at the University of Bari, where he also became Provveditore degli Studi ("Superintendent of Studies"). In 1952, his book Un popolo di formiche (which means "a people of ants") won the prestigious Viareggio Prize.

== Works ==
- Fiore, Tommaso (1952). Un popolo di formiche. Bari: Laterza. ISBN 88-87467-59-5.
- Fiore, Tommaso (1955). Il cafone all'inferno. Torino: Einaudi. ISBN 88-88872-30-2.
- Tommaso Fiore (30 October 1966). "Il sacco di Altamura". Intervento al Convegno Nazionale di Studio Su Gli Albori del Risorgimento in Terra di Bari, Indetto Dal Comitato Provinciale di Bari dell'Istituto per la Storia del Risorgimento Italiano Tenutosi a Bari Nei Giorni 29, 30, 31 Ottobre 1966. Bari. inside Giuseppe Bolognese (1999). Zecher la chorban – Memoria del sacrificio. Tipografia Castellano – Altamura. pp. 59–82.
- Tommaso Fiore. "Serie di articoli". La Rivoluzione Liberale. Turin: Energie nove.

== See also ==
- Meridionalism
- Il cafone all'inferno
- Southern Italy
- Apulia
- Land reform#Italy
