= Genoa Courthouse =

Judiciary building in Genoa, Italy

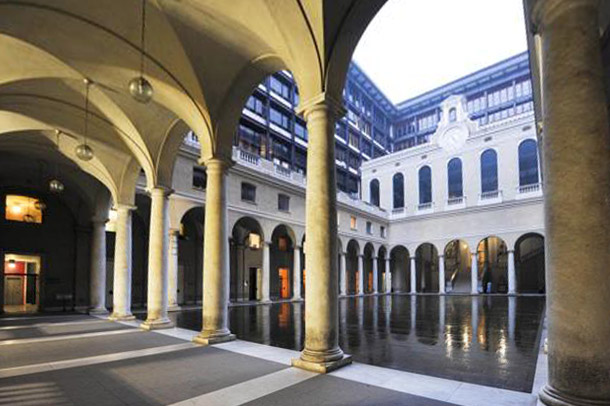
- Interactive map of the Genoa Courthouse area

General information
- Location: Genoa, Liguria, Italy
- Coordinates: 44°24′27.81″N 8°56′16.37″E
- Construction started: 1966
- Completed: 1974

Design and construction
- Architects: Giovanni Romano, Giorgio Olcese, Giulio Zappa, Luciano Mascia

The Genoa Courthouse (Italian: Palazzo di Giustizia di Genova, lit. 'Palace of Justice of Genoa', also known as Palazzo degli Uffici Giudiziari) is a judicial complex located in the Portoria district of Genoa, Italy.

== History ==
On the site of the courthouse, there previously stood the building of the ancient Pammatone hospital from the 15th century, which was renovated by Andrea Orsolino in the second half of the 18th century. In 1928, after the closure of the hospital, the building housed the municipal demographic offices. During World War II, the structure suffered severe damage due to bombings in 1943, leaving only the courtyard portico and part of the foundation intact. At the end of the war, it was decided to build the new courthouse on this site, with the project entrusted to architect Giovanni Romano, with the collaboration of Giorgio Olcese, Giulio Zappa, and Luciano Mascia, who worked on it starting from 1950. However, construction work only began in 1966, and the building was completed in 1974.

== Description ==
The project for the building included restoring the portico, with a faithful reconstruction of the internal courtyard, still accessible via the old original staircase. The architects aimed to integrate the surviving parts of the hospital with a modern steel, glass and concrete structure, also recovering the mezzanine and the large clock in the center, to recreate, as far as possible, the original setting of the 18th-century courtyard.

The entrance to the building is in Piazza Portoria, where the Balilla monument by sculptor Vincenzo Giani is located.

== Sources ==
- Sei itinerari in Portoria (PDF). Genoa: Samizdat. 1997.
- Gianluca Cristoforetti; Sergio Torre; Hilda Ghiara (2004). Genova. Guida di architettura moderna. Florence: Alinea. p. 172.
- Giovanna Franco; Stefano Francesco Musso (2016). Architetture in Liguria dopo il 1945. Genoa: De Ferrari. p. 139.
- Luigi Lagomarsino (2004). Cento anni di architetture a Genova: 1890–2004. Genoa: Deferrari & Devega. p. 138.
- Mauro Moricone; Francesco Rosadini (2004). Genova 900. L'architettura del Movimento Moderno. Turin: Testo&Immagine. p. 48.
- Ennio Poleggi (1998). Genova. Guida all'architettura. Torino: Allemandi. p. 105.
