= Il Baretti =

Italian literary magazine (1924–1928)

- Cover page of the first issue
- Director: Piero Gobetti; Piero Zanetti
- Categories: Literary magazine
- Frequency: Monthly
- Founder: Piero Gobetti
- Founded: 1924
- First issue: 23 December 1924
- Final issue: December 1928
- Country: Kingdom of Italy
- Based in: Turin
- Language: Italian

Il Baretti was a monthly literary magazine which was one of the publications launched and edited by Piero Gobetti. The magazine was published in Turin in the period between 1924 and 1928. The title was a reference to Giuseppe Baretti, who was an author in the eighteenth century, an exile and pre-romantic pilgrim.

== History and profile ==
Il Baretti was first published in Turin on 23 December 1924. It was the third and last publication started by Piero Gobetti. It was started as a four-page literary supplement of Gobetti's other magazine La Rivoluzione Liberale. He used the magazine to continue his critical approach towards Fascism after the closure of La Rivoluzione Liberale in 1925. Gobetti directed the magazine from its start in 1924 to until his death in February 1926. Augusto Monti took over the magazine following the death of Gobetti. Monti was succeeded by Santino Caramella and Piero Zanetti who directed it until its closure in December 1928.

Il Baretti came out monthly and featured reviews and essays. Its major contributors included Leone Ginzburg, Benedetto Croce, Eugenio Montale and Gaetano Salvemini. Massimo Mila started his career as a music critic and historian in the magazine in 1928. Il Baretti also published translations of works by the well-known Surrealists and Dadaists, including James Joyce, Rainer Maria Rilke, Virginia Woolf, André Gide, Paul Valéry, Stéphane Mallarmé, Marcel Proust and Charles Baudelaire. It was one of the publications which contributed to the development of the concept of Europeanism. During its lifetime Il Baretti produced a total of 53 issues and also, special issues on French literature and German theater.
