= Massimo Mila =

Italian politician and musicologist

Massimo Mila

Massimo Mila (14 August 1910 – 26 December 1988) was an Italian musicologist, music critic, intellectual and anti-fascist.

== Biography ==
He studied at the Liceo classico Massimo d'Azeglio in Turin, where he was a pupil of Augusto Monti and where he had Cesare Pavese, Leone Ginzburg, Norberto Bobbio and Guido Seborga as fellow students. He also met Giulio Einaudi, to whom he gave Latin lessons, introducing him to the "brotherhood" of D'Azeglio's former students, including Vittorio Foa, Giulio Carlo Argan, Ludovico Geymonat, Franco Antonicelli, and others. He started his career as a music critic in 1928 publishing articles in the magazine Il Baretti. He graduated in literature in 1931 from the University of Turin, aged twenty-one, with a thesis entitled Il melodramma di Verdi, which, thanks to the direct interest of the philosopher Benedetto Croce, would be published two years later by the Laterza publishing house in Bari. He was also an expert mountaineer, and a member of the Italian Academic Alpine Club, a passion that was born in Coazze thanks to the encouragement from his mother and the first excursions in the Val Sangone.

Opposition to the fascist regime soon matured in the Turin environment. He was imprisoned for the first time in 1929 for anti-fascist activities. He joined the Turin group of "Justice and Freedom" (Giustizia e Libertà) and, on 15 May 1935, following a report by the writer Dino Segre -alias Pitigrilli- he was arrested for the second time together with Einaudi, Foa, Ginzburg, Antonicelli, Bobbio, Pavese, Carlo Levi and Luigi Salvatorelli. He was sentenced by the Tribunale Speciale to seven years imprisonment with inter alia Riccardo Bauer and Ernesto Rossi, which he spent in the prison of Regina Coeli in Rome. In a moment of despair he wrote a letter addressed to Mussolini: "Never again will I allow myself to do or express anything that can be, directly or indirectly, in any case hostile, or contrary to, or harmful to the Regime". In a 1992 interview, Vittorio Foa exonerated his friend and attributed his collapse to the physical and moral violence wrought against him by the fascist repressive apparatus.

In prison he translated Goethe's Elective Affinities, later published by Einaudi. While a partisan leader of the Giustizia e Libertà in the Canavese, he translated Siddhartha by Hermann Hesse, published in 1945 by Frassinelli. After serving his sentence, in 1940 he collaborated with Giulio Einaudi and his publishing house, where he had as friends and workmates Giaime Pintor, Felice Balbo, Pavese and Ginzburg. Placed under special surveillance, after the armistice of 8 September 1943 he joined the Resistance entering the group Justice and Freedom of the Canavese, later adhering to the Action Party.

After the war, the Giuseppe Verdi Conservatory in Turin invited him to teach History of Music in 1954, while the University offered him a job in 1967 in the same subject, which he held until 1975. In addition to continuing his collaboration with the publishing house Einaudi, he was a music critic for Turin's "L'Unità" between 1946 and 1967 and for the weekly "L'Espresso" between 1955 and 1967, while from 1967 he moved to "La Stampa". An academic of the National Academy of Santa Cecilia since 1956, he also carried out literary activities, translating among other things works by Goethe, Schiller, Gotthelf, Hesse, Wiechert, and the autobiography of Richard Wagner. In 1967 he became the director of the Nuova Rivista Musicale Italiana. On 26 February 1981, he had a very serious car accident, in which his wife, Francesca Rovedotti, lost her life. In 1985 he received the Feltrinelli International Prize from the Accademia Nazionale dei Lincei.

In the years following his death, an important international literary prize was entitled to Mila, the "Massimo Mila Award" (Premio Massimo Mila), volumes of studies were dedicated and numerous unpublished works were published, on 2 December 2008 a study day was held at the Conservatory of Turin in his honour, on the initiative of the municipal administration and the Franco Antonicelli Cultural Union, (Unione culturale Franco Antonicelli) with a round table in which Roberto Aruga, Alberto Cavagnon, Giorgio Pestelli, Andrea Casalegno and Enzo Restagno discussed the various interests that have characterized the figure of Massimo Mila: music, anti-fascism, literature, painting, and his passion for the mountains. In 2018, the Italian Alpine Club proposed a new edition of mountain writings, entitled "The two threads of my existence", dedicating two concerts to him, edited by Angelo Foletto and with the participation of the SAT Choir, at the Auditorium of Milan and at the Conservatory of Turin.

== Monographs ==
- L'esperienza musicale e l'estetica, Collana Saggi n.121, Torino, Einaudi, 1950-2001, ISBN 88-06-16066-4. Premio Viareggio di Saggistica 1950
- M. Mila-Tensing Norkey, Gli eroi del Chomolungma, Collana Nuova Atlantide n.2, Torino, Einaudi, 1954.
- Cronache musicali 1955-1959, Collana Saggi, Torino, Einaudi, 1959.
- Breve storia della musica, Collana Piccola Biblioteca n.31, Torino, Einaudi, 1963.; ed. orig.: Milano, Bianchi-Giovini, 1946.
- Maderna musicista europeo, Torino, Einaudi, 1976. - Nuova edizione a cura di U. Mosch, Collana Piccola Biblioteca.Nuova serie, Einaudi, 1999, ISBN 88-06-15059-6
- Lettura della Nona Sinfonia, Collana Piccola Biblioteca n.306, Einaudi, Torino, 1977, ISBN 88-06-47019-1 [sulla Nona Sinfonia di Beethoven]
- Lettura delle «Nozze di Figaro». Mozart e la ricerca della felicità, Collana Piccola Biblioteca n.371, Einaudi, Torino, 1979-2003, ISBN 88-06-16684-0
- L'arte di Verdi, Collana Saggi n.627, Torino, Einaudi, 1980.
- Wolfgang Amadeus Mozart, Collezione Biblioteca, Edizioni Studio Tesi, 1980.
- Compagno Strawinsky, Collana Saggi n.652, Einaudi, Torino, 1983; Rizzoli, Milano, 2012
- Lettura del Don Giovanni di Mozart, Collana Piccola Biblioteca n.494, Einaudi, Torino, 1988-2000, ISBN 88-06-15680-2
- Lettura del Flauto Magico, Collana Piccola Biblioteca, Einaudi, Torino, 1989-2006, ISBN 88-06-18019-3
- Scritti di montagna, A cura di Anna Mila Giubertoni. Con una presentazione di Gianni Vattimo e uno scritto di Italo Calvino, Collana Gli gtruzzi n.432, Torino, Einaudi, 1992, ISBN 88-06-12878-7.
- Brahms e Wagner, a cura di Alberto Batisti, Collana ETascabili, Einaudi, Torino, 1994, ISBN 88-06-13506-6
- Scritti civili, a cura di Alberto Cavaglion. Con una nota di Giulio Einaudi, Collana Gli struzzi n.471, Einaudi, Torino, 1995, ISBN 88-06-13841-3
- L'arte di Béla Bartòk, a cura di Francesco M. Colombo, Einaudi, Torino, 1996, ISBN 88-06-14056-6
- Guillaume Dufay, a cura di Simone Monge, Collana Piccola Biblioteca n.646, Einaudi, Torino, 1997, ISBN 88-06-14672-6
- Mozart. Saggi 1941-1987, a cura di Anna Mila Giubertoni, Einaudi, Torino, 2006, ISBN 88-06-18088-6
- I quartetti di Mozart, Introduzione di Giovanni Morelli, Collana Piccola Biblioteca, Einaudi, Torino, 2009, ISBN 88-06-17168-2
- Lettere editoriali, a cura di Tommaso Munari, trascrizione di Giovanna Andrea Tira, Torino, Einaudi, 2010.

== Essays and articles ==
- La melodia bizantina (in RMI, 1946);
- La nascita del melodramma (in Civiltà Fiorentina. Il Sei-Settecento, Firenze, 1956);
- Introduzione all'"Autobiografia" di R. Wagner (in "Belfagor", 1951);
- La vita della musica nell'Ottocento italiano (in ital. in "Belfagor", 1957; voce " Italien 19. Jahrh. ", MGG);
- La linea Nono (in RaM, 1960);
- L'età brahmsiana (in AA. VV., Arte e Storia. Studi in onore di L. Vincenti, Torino, 1965);
- Musica e scuola nel costume italiano (in NRMI, 1967);
- L'unità stilistica nell'opera di Verdi (ibid., 1968);
- "Il Turco in Italia", manifesto di dolce vita (ibid.);
- La fortuna di Rossini (in "Bollettino del Centro di studi rossiniano", 1968);
- La dialogizzazione dell'aria nelle opere giovanili di Verdi (Atti del 1 Congresso Internaz. di Studi Verdiani, Parma, 1969);
- Casorati e la musica (in AA. VV., Testimonianze. Studi e ricerche in onore di Guido M. Gatti, Bologna, 1973);
- Lettura della Grande Fuga op. 133 (in AA. VV., Scritti in onore di Luigi Ronga, Milano-Napoli, 1973);
- Gianfrancesco Malipiero e l'irrazionalismo contemporaneo (Atti dell'Istituto Veneto di Scienze, Lettere ed Arti Venezia 1974) .
- Sulla Dodecafonia di Dallapiccola (in "Annali della Scuola Normale Superiore di Pisa", 1976);
- Nona Sinfonia e Quartetti nei Quaderni di conversazione (in NRMI, 1979);
- Il Romanticismo nella musica (in "Belfagor", 1979);
- Guillaume Dufay, musicista franco-borgognone (ibid., 1980);
- Tra Wagner e Nietzsche (in "Cultura e Scuola", 1980);
- I canoni di Mozart (in NRMI, 1981);
- L'equivoco della musica barocca (in "Belfagor", 1981);
- La vecchiaia di Bach (Atti dell'Accademia delle Scienze di Torino, 1981);
- Il "collage" in musica (in AA. VV., Scritti in onore di G. C. Argan, Roma, 1984);
- L'antico e il progresso nel carteggio tra Verdi e Boito (in "Belfagor", 1984);
- "La donna è mobile..." Considerazioni sull'edizione critica del Rigoletto (in NRMI, 1985);
- Le idee di Rossini (come pref. a Rossini, Lettere, Firenze, s. a., ma 1985);
- La fortuna di Mozart (in "Belfagor", 1985).

== Correspondence ==
- Argomenti strettamente famigliari. Lettere dal carcere 1935-1940, a cura di Paolo Soddu. Introduzione di Claudio Pavone, Collana Gli struzzi n.509, Einaudi, Torino 1999, ISBN 88-06-15062-6
- Luigi Dallapiccola-Massimo Mila, Tempus aedificandi. Carteggio 1933-1975, a cura di L. Aragona, Milano, Ricordi (Universal Music MGB), 2005, ISBN 88-7592-798-7
- Massimo Mila-Luigi Nono, Nulla di oscuro tra noi. Lettere 1952-1988, a cura di A.I. De Benedictis e V. Rizzardi, Milano, Il Saggiatore 2010, ISBN 978-88-428-1645-4

== Translations ==
- Ernst Wiechert, Novella pastorale, Collana di Opere brevi, Torino, Frassinelli, 1942.
- Johann Wolfgang von Goethe, Le affinità elettive, Torino, Einaudi, 1943.
- Paul Ernst, Il seme sulla speranza, Torino, Frassinelli, 1944.
- Hermann Hesse, Siddharta, Collana di romanzi, Torino, Frassinelli, 1945. - Milano, Adelphi, 1973, ISBN 88-459-0184-X.
- Jeremias Gotthelf, Il ragno nero, Milano, Minuziano, 1945. poi Studio Tesi, 1987; Milano, Adelphi, 1996.
- Guy de Maupassant, L'eredità, Collana di Opere brevi n.6, Torino, Frassinelli, 1945. Collana Scrittori tradotti da scrittori, Einaudi, 1989.
- Friedrich Schiller, Wallenstein. Trilogia drammatica, Collana I Grandi Scrittori Stranieri, Torino, UTET, 1946. Collana Scrittori tradotti da scrittori n.49, Einaudi, 1993.
- Richard Wagner, La mia vita, Torino, EDT, 1982.

== Honours ==
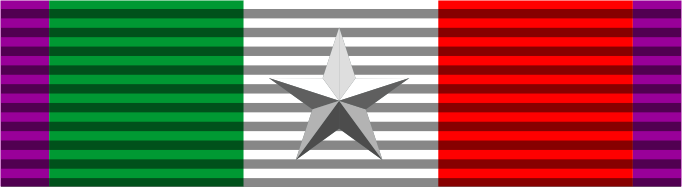
- Italian Medal of Merit for Culture and Art.
