= Franco Antonicelli =

Italian author, poet, publisher, essayist and anti-fascist activist

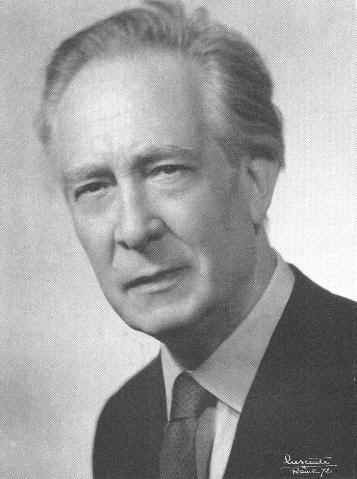
- Born: 15 November 1902; Voghera, Kingdom of Italy
- Died: 6 November 1974 (aged 71); Turin, Italy
- Education: University of Turin
- Occupations: Author; journalist; teacher; publisher; anti-fascist activist

Franco Antonicelli (15 November 1902 – 6 November 1974) was an Italian author, poet, publisher, essayist and anti-fascist activist.

== Early life and career ==
Antonicelli was born in to the wealthy family of an official from Apulia. While living in Turin in 1908, he attended the classical high school Massimo d'Azeglio, where he was a student of Umberto Cosmo, and obtained his high school diploma. At the university he graduated first in literature and then, in 1931, thinking of pursuing a diplomatic career, also in law. During his studies he met many exponents of the Turin intellectuals of the time, such as Augusto Monti, Lalla Romano, Leone Ginzburg, Cesare Pavese, Norberto Bobbio, Massimo Mila and Ludovico Geymonat.

On 31 May 1929 he was arrested for having signed, with other Turin intellectuals, a letter of solidarity with Benedetto Croce. After a month in prison, he was sentenced to three years of confinement but the sentence was commuted to a warning. He then worked as a substitute teacher in the Liceo d'Azeglio and was also Gianni Agnelli's private tutor. From 1932 he was director of the Biblioteca Europea dei libri series of the Frassinelli publisher. By his choice, works by Herman Melville and Franz Kafka, Eugene O'Neill and James Joyce, as well as Walt Disney's Mickey Mouse, entered Italy for the first time.

== Resistance ==
His association the Turin group of Justice and Freedom (Giustizia e Libertà) gathered in the editorial staff of the magazine Cultura published by Einaudi and which included, among others, Carlo Levi and Cesare Pavese, caused his arrest in May 1935 which occurred following a denunciation by the writer Pitigrilli. On 15 July Antonicelli was sentenced to three years of confinement to be served in Agropoli. During his confinement he married Renata, daughter of the notary Annibale Germano, in whose villa in Sordevolo he often stayed and met his friends. He was freed in March 1936.

In 1942 he founded the Francesco De Silva publishing house and committed himself, urged by Croce, to the reorganization of the Liberal Party (PLI). Immediately after 8 September he moved to Rome where on 6 November he was arrested by the Germans and imprisoned in Regina Coeli. In February 1944 he was transferred to the Castelfranco Emilia prison and was released on 18 April. Returning to Turin, he joined, as a representative of the Liberal Party, the National Liberation Committee of Piedmont, of which he assumed the presidency in 1945, directing an edition of the clandestine Risorgimento Liberale and collaborating on the Risorgimento and Il Patriota newspapers (both publications of the liberal partisan groups operating in Piedmont).

== Post-war career ==
After the fall of fascism, in June 1945, he participated in the foundation of the "Cultural Union" of Turin, which after his death was named after him. His political idea, in favor of maintaining an agreement with all the anti-fascist forces in the spirit of the CLN, and his republican choice came into conflict with the line of the party, which supported the monarchy and determined to break the anti-fascist unity. Thus, in April 1946, he left the Liberal Party for the Democratic-Republican Concentration of Ugo La Malfa and Ferruccio Parri, which merged after the referendum of 2 June 1946 into the Republican Party, of which he became one of the leaders at the Naples congress of 1948. The party's choice to ally with the Christian Democrats in the elections of 18 April convinced him to abandon the party.

He was a founder of the Historical Institute of the Resistance in Piedmont on 25 April 1947 and became its first president. In that year he published If This Is a Man, Primo Levi's masterpiece which had been rejected by other publishers, including Einaudi. It was one of the last publications of the Da Silva publishing house, which Antonicelli closed in 1949.

In this period he collaborated with RAI with the cultural radio program Terza pagina and the Turin newspaper La Stampa, producing articles on French literature and Italian decadentism.

In 1953 he joined the National Democratic Alliance, a grouping of liberals and republicans opposed to the political alliance with the Christian Democrats, which fought against the so-called "scam law" (legge truffa), the electoral law which provided a prize to the list that obtained the majority absolute in the elections, and which was repealed following the defeat of the centrist parties in favor of the law at the June 7 elections. He took a stand against the political and trade union discrimination carried out by Vittorio Valletta's FIAT against communist workers or members of the FIOM and in 1960 he argued that the Tambroni government, elected with the votes of the DC and the Italian Social Movement (MSI), represented a danger for Italian democracy, more so after the demonstrations in multiple cities in which there were also deaths among the demonstrators. Having denounced these facts in a speech in Bologna, Antonicelli was tried for condoning a crime. He was sentenced in the first instance with probation but was acquitted on appeal.

In 1968 he was elected to the Senate as an independent on the PCI - PSIUP list for the Alessandria-Tortona constituency. On that occasion, the group of left-wing independents was formed for the first time in Parliament and Antonicelli was a member of the Defense, Public Education and Supervision commissions for radio and television broadcasts. He was re-elected in the 1972 political elections, and took part in the Defense and Radio and Television Supervision commissions.

His library, made up of over forty thousand volumes, was donated to the Livorno Port Company, where the Franco Antonicelli Foundation was founded for its valorisation.

== Works ==
- Il soldato di Lambessa, ERI, Torino, 1956.
- Festa grande di aprile, Einaudi, Torino, 1964.
- Calendario di letture, ERI, Torino, 1966.
- La moneta seminata e altri scritti, con un saggio di varianti e una scelta di documenti su Guido Gozzano, a cura di F. Antonicelli, Milano, 1968.
- Le parole turchine, illustrazioni di G. Tribaudino, Einaudi, Torino, 1973.
- Resistenza, cultura e classe operaia, prefazione di G. C. Pajetta, Quaderni del movimento operaio n. 3, Gruppo Editoriale Piemontese, Torino, 1975.
- Dall'antifascismo alla resistenza. Trent'anni di storia italiana (1915-1945), Einaudi, Torino, 1975.
- La pratica della libertà, Documenti, discorsi, scritti politici 1929-1974, con ritratto critico di C. Stajano, Einaudi, Torino, 1976.
- Capitoli gozzaniani, a cura di M. Mari, Leo S. Olschki, Firenze, 1982.
- Improvvisi e altri versi (1944-1974), All'insegna del pesce d'oro, Milano, 1984.
- Finibusterre, Besa Editrice, Nardò, 1999.
- Pinocchio ha settant'anni (1951), Università degli Studi di Pavia, Centro di ricerca sulla tradizione manoscritta di Autori moderni e contemporanei, 2002.
- Le letture tendenziose, ed. e/o, Roma, 2021.
