= Centro Svizzero =

Early skyscraper in Milan, Italy

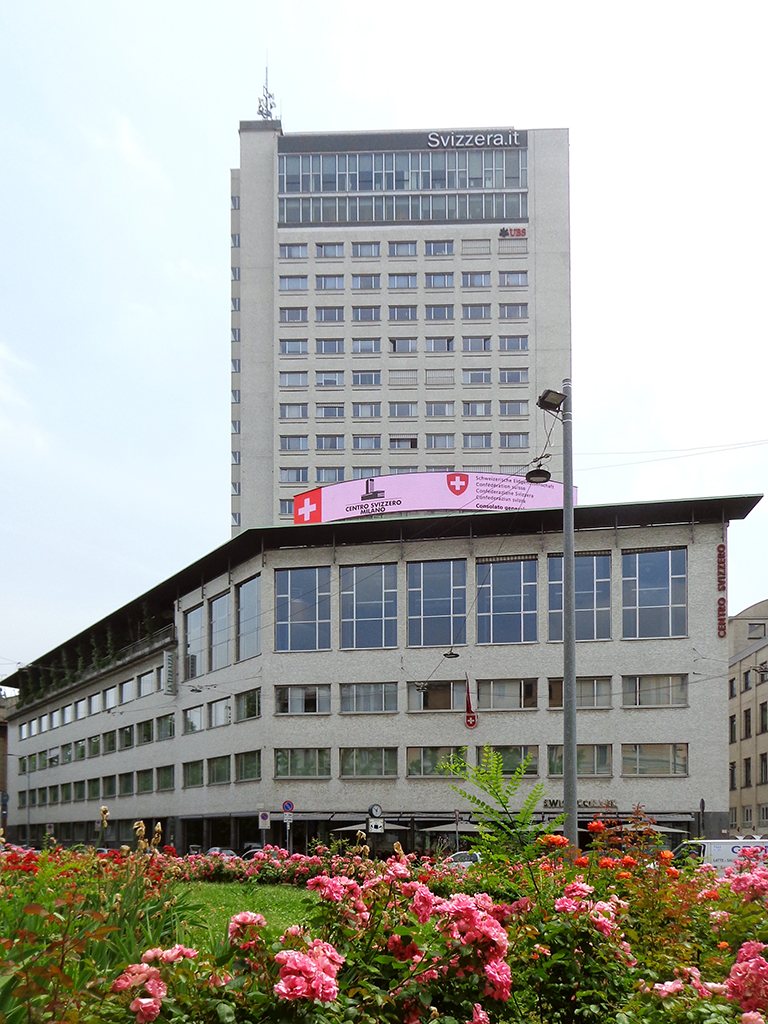
- Centro Svizzero in 2015
- Interactive map of the Centro Svizzero area

General information
- Type: Commercial
- Location: Milan, Italy
- Coordinates: 45°28′21.08″N 9°11′48.06″E
- Construction started: 1949
- Opening: 1951

Height
- Height: 80 m (260 ft)

Design and construction
- Architects: Armin Meili, Giovanni Romano

The Centro Svizzero (English: Swiss Center) is an early skyscraper and a landmark in Milan, Italy. Built in 1949-51 to replace the Hotel Cavour, it was Milan's highest building until 1954, when it was overtaken by the so-called "Breda Tower".

The tower is situated at Via Palestro 2-4, near the center of Milan, and has a height of 20 stories (80 m). Its construction by architects Armin Meili and Giovanni Romano was initiated by the Swiss Association of Milan as a replacement of their former headquarters that were destroyed by a 1943 bombing raid. Nowadays, it also houses among others the Swiss General Consulate, the Swiss Institute of Culture and the Swiss Chamber of Commerce, as well as offices of Switzerland Tourism and Swiss TV and Radio. The building is owned by the Swiss Federal Authorities.
