= Meridionalism =

Study of how to bridge north south divide in Italy

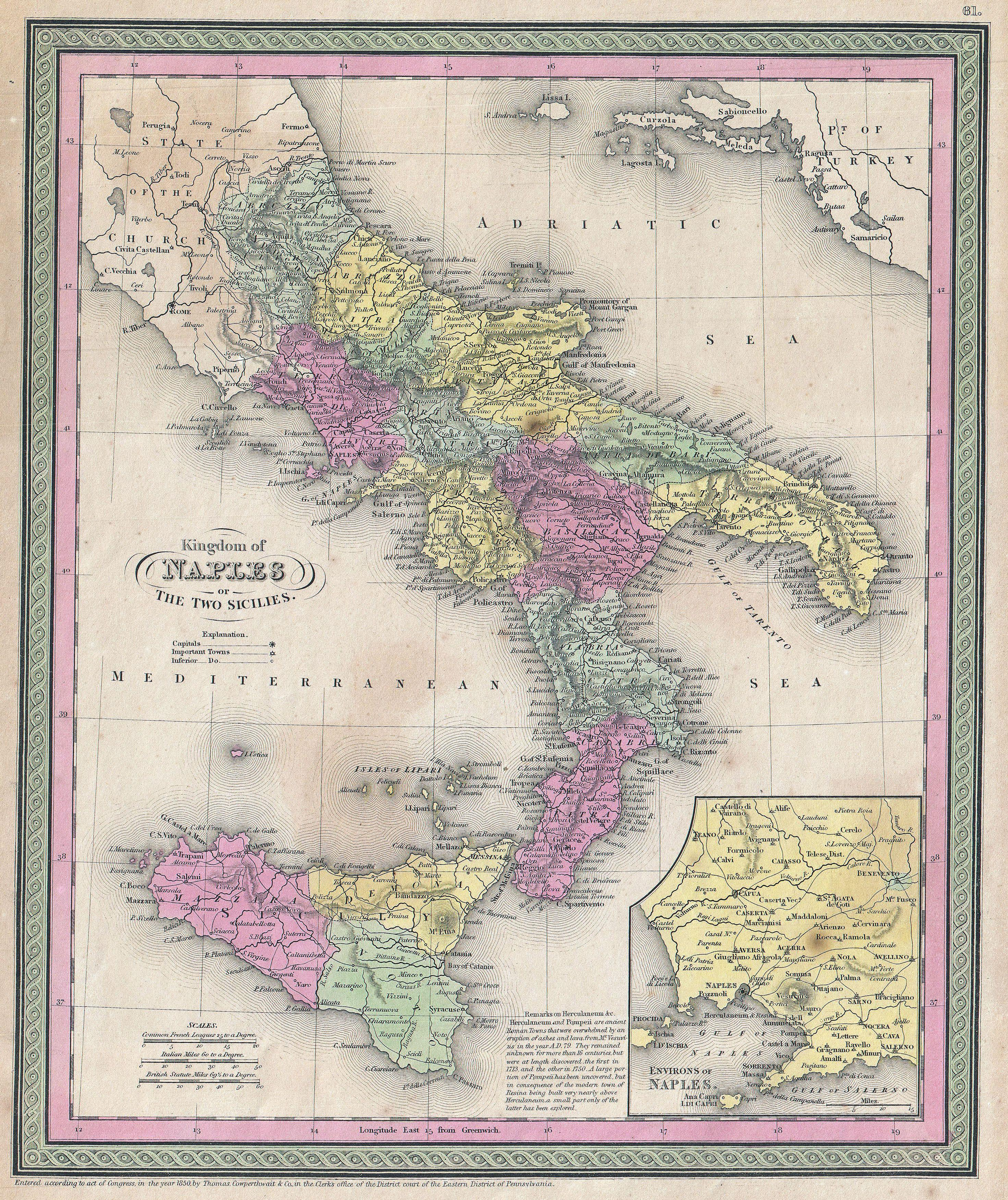
Map from 1853 featuring the Kingdom of the Two Sicilies

Meridionalism (Italian: meridionalismo) is the study and research of the economical and social issues of Southern Italy. It started in the 19th century, after the annexation of the former Kingdom of the Two Sicilies during the process of Italian unification, and continued over the 20th century. The study of these issues was not only meant for theoretical research, but also to find a solution and to bridge the social, cultural and economical gap between Northern Italy and Southern Italy (questione meridionale). The scholars and academics who carried out research in this field are referred to as meridionalists (Italian: meridionalisti).

== See also ==
- Brigandage in Southern Italy after 1861
- Mezzogiorno
- Risorgimento
- Tommaso Fiore
