= Giuseppe Gobetti =

Italian footballer

Personal information
- Date of birth: May 6, 1909
- Place of birth: Turin, Italy
- Position: Midfielder

Senior career*
Years	Team	Apps	(Gls)
1929–1931	Juventus	1	(0)
1931–1932	Juventus Trapani		
1933–1934	Cagliari		
- * Club domestic league appearances and goals

Giuseppe Gobetti (born May 6, 1909 in Turin) was an Italian professional football player.
