= The Humanitarian Society =

The Humanitarian Society (Italian: Società Umanitaria) is a philanthropic institution founded in Milan in 1893 by a bequest made by Prospero Moisè Loria.

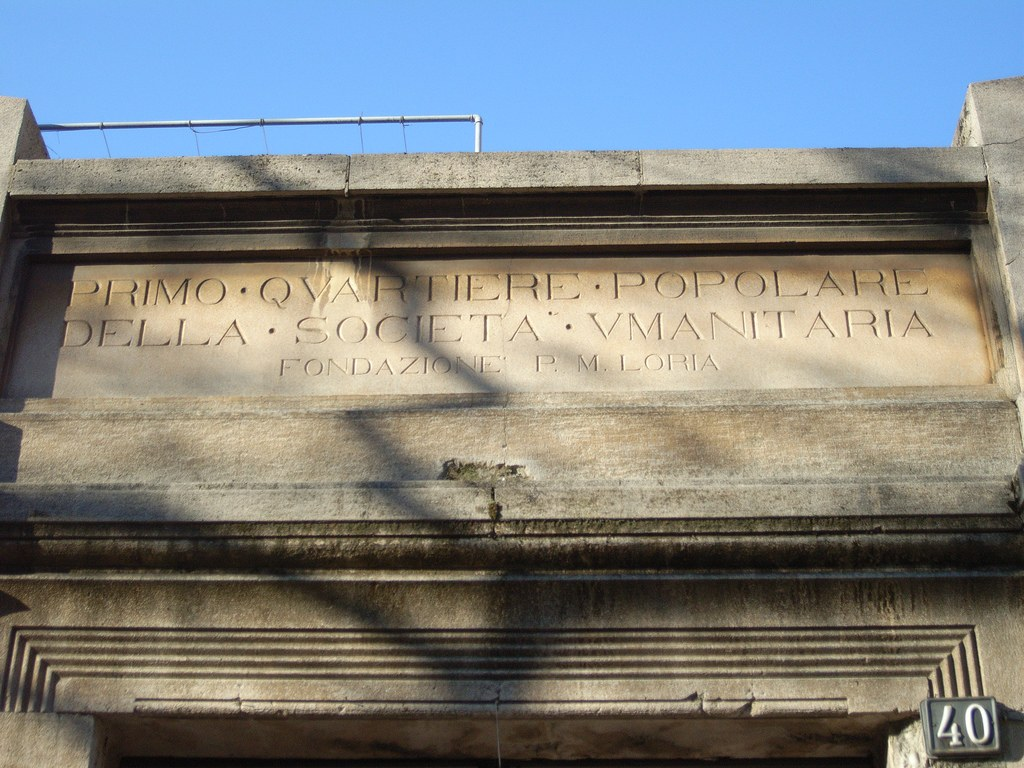
Inscription on the gateway to the Humanitarian worker district, Via Solari 40, Milan.

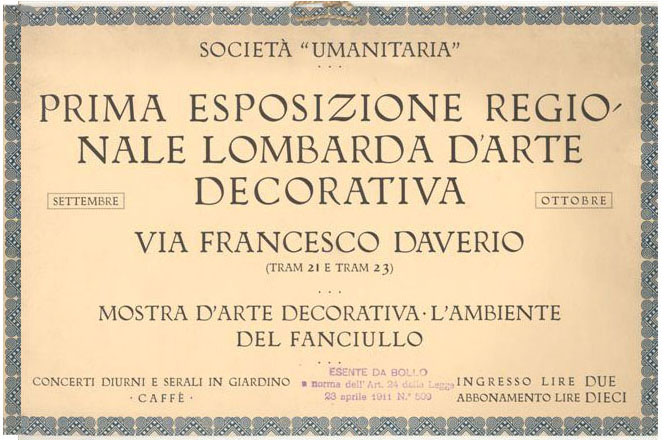
Poster of the first Lombardy regional exhibition of decorative art organized by the Humanitarian Society in 1919.

== History ==
The Humanitarian Society is one of Milan's longest-standing institutions. It was founded thanks to the determination and mission of Jewish international merchant and enlightened patron, Prospero Moisè Loria. In 1892, he decided to bequeath his considerable assets (over ten million lire of the time) to ensure that the newly established Humanitarian Society – to be managed by Milan Municipal Authority – was engaged in every possible way in "helping the underprivileged become independent, providing them with support, employment and education, and more generally working to achieve the best educational and socio-cultural development in every sector of individual and collective life."

From its founding, the philanthropic institution's secretary was Osvaldo Gnocchi-Viani, promoter of the first Chamber of Labour in Milan. Reformist politicians and intellectuals like Filippo Turati, Emilio Caldara, and above all brothers Ugo and Giulio Pisa, dedicated women like Alessandrina Ravizza and Maria Montessori, professionals like Alessandro Mazzucotelli, Eugenio Quarti, Alfredo Ravasco, artists from Arturo Toscanini to Victor de Sabata, all pledged their support.

The Humanitarian Society became effective in 1902, after a long legal battle, and was not without hostility toward its mission to promote social justice.

Thanks to its positive achievements, the Humanitarian Society was an important experiment in Italian social and political life for over twenty years. Its officers were elected in public assemblies, and their declared intention was to combine assistance and training for employment, social commitment and education, emancipation and culture, thereby growing "basic charity into fruitful constructive support."

In 1904, the Humanitarian Society promoted the establishment of the Istituto di Credito per le Cooperative S.A., contributing much of the initial capital. This bank was the financial division for the development, for example, of labour cooperatives active in public procurement.

As Enrico Decleva declared, the Humanitarian Society's executive pursued "a plan linked to the belief that the improvement of professional skills has a direct and significant influence on the economic condition of the worker, and the parallel certainty that the skilled worker, the accomplished and absolute master of a trade, rarely risks unemployment."

=== Worker districts in Milan ===
From 1902, with Luigi Majno and Luigi Della Torre at the helm, the Humanitarian Society developed notable examples of public housing with attached educational facilities. In 1908, the first Montessori Children's Houses (Case dei Bambini) were established in the Society's Milan worker district, forerunners of the present-day condominium nursery.

From 1905 to 1908, two model quarters were designed by the architect Giovanni Broglio and built in what were then the southwestern suburbs of Milan: in Via Solari, the Primo quartiere popolare della Società Umanitaria (First Worker District of the Humanitarian Society); and to the north, the Secondo quartiere popolare della Società Umanitaria (Second Worker District of the Humanitarian Society), in Viale Lombardia.

The two quarters occupied a rectangular area and developed a continuous unit of 12 buildings linked around an exterior perimeter and enclosing a vast courtyard filled with greenery and fenced gardens, perfect for family socialization. Each district had 200 flats of various sizes, from studios to three-room units.

An innovative feature for the time, given that the dwellings were for the working classes, was the presence of a small facilities room in each, fitted with a toilet, sink and direct waste pipe down to the cellars. It is no secret that before then, public housing was designed with a running balcony and a single squat-down toilet and a sink per floor and landing, shared by several dwellings. Carlo Emilio Gadda mentioned the Humanitarian Society in his novel La meccanica.

=== Educational services ===
The Humanitarian Society proposed a solution to underemployment by instituting various professional day and evening courses. It set up employment offices in various Italian cities.

One of the most memorable schools of arts and industry was Monza's University of Decorative Arts, later called ISIA. The institution also financed a network of worker libraries.

The Humanitarian Society set up agricultural offices and promoted consumer cooperatives for farm labourers and factory workers. At the same time, in Italy and Europe, it opened offices for emigrants abroad, the most noteworthy being the Casa degli Emigranti in Milan, built in 1907 at the old central railway station.

The Society published studies and research on every aspect of labour (unemployment, health conditions, employment offices, alcoholism, work-related illnesses, etc.). From 1924, the government placed the institution, of which Senator Luigi Della Torre was president, under the administration of a government-appointed commissioner.

=== Resumption of activities after World War 2 ===
The Allied bombings of 1943 razed the buildings in Via Daverio, Via San Barnaba, Via Pace, and Via Fanti to the ground: over 120,000 cubic metres of rubble, but immediately after the War, Riccardo Bauer began a successful reconstruction. Education for young people and lifelong training for adults resumed. Worker libraries, film clubs, and the focus on the prison system reopened.

"The reconstruction of a body like the Humanitarian Society appeared a worthy and priority task to me, and justified setting aside direct political involvement," Bauer recalled, "even if I still felt the need for political action, but conceived it differently, as a contribution to a cultural and moral political maturity which must be the primary underpinning of a real democracy (...). I immediately began to study a plan that started from the extant degraded situation and went on to a material reconstruction of the completely derelict buildings, and then to the operational reconstruction of the institution, which could not fail to have extreme significance in the situation in which the country found itself, having to face social problems that were not easy to solve. I was thinking of a revival and modernization of the venerable and worthy foundation dedicated to the progress of workers and the needy."

Despite financial difficulties, the body of initiatives and structures set in motion by Bauer was significant.

From the reopening of the vocational schools (day and evening, refresher and specialization courses) to the rebirth of the famous “Scuola del Libro” (the book school whose teachers included Bruno Munari and Albe Steiner); publication of a fortnightly emigration bulletin (a working tool for branch offices in direct contact with workers looking to emigrate, but still "unable to establish themselves as bodies of serious information because they are absolutely ignorant of any certain information and therefore unable to work efficiently"); the recovery of the centre for social studies; residential adult education courses; the network of cultural service centres activated in Southern Italy on behalf of the Cassa del Mezzogiorno project (in Sardinia, Cagliari, Alghero, Carbonia–Iglesias are still active). Last but not least, in the 1950s, secondary schools were established for employment guidance and placement, the first example of a middle school preparing students for the world of work (in the 1970s merged into a state institution, ITSOS).

In 1947, Bauer wrote that "The Humanitarian Society is revived with complex initiatives in its sights, aiming for the systematic preparation of tangible social progress, affirming that idea of harmonious technical, moral and civic advancement of workers which has been the soul of the institution since its origins. Suffice it to say that the Humanitarian Society is gradually rising from its ashes to be once more a small world in which all problems encountered by people working and living in society are addressed; in which provisions for enabling tangible improvement, tangible material and moral refinement of the workers in each category are basically studied, developed and implemented."

Then, the long wave of the extreme Left protest reached the institution, Bauer was forced to resign and again it was placed under a commissioner. Then an ill-fated state law revoked the educational authorizations and the schools were taken over by Lombardy Regional Authority. Nonetheless, the Humanitarian Society did not die. Its new executive refashioned its social commitment, giving life to new forms of “assistance” while also developing the cultural machine: in the 1990s, the Humaniter Foundation was founded as a centre for voluntary work, solidarity and leisure. Theatre, music, cinema, art, and poetry summer festivals in the cloisters were put in place, as were competitions and scholarships, not forgetting conferences, refresher courses, exhibitions, and book publications.

== The Humanitarian Society School ==
The Humanitarian Society School for "arts and trades" was and still is a historical branch of the Humanitarian Society, even today, in its headquarters in Via Daverio, behind Milan's Palazzo di Giustizia. The school was the forerunner to Monza's famous ISIA, established in 1922.

The first president of the School was lawyer Luigi Majno, a member of the educated Milanese bourgeoisie. From 1913 to 1924, he was succeeded by his vice-president, Senator Luigi Della Torre, a private banker and co-owner of the Zaccaria Pisa bank, also active in Milanese public life. Augusto Osimo was designated general manager for two decades. Notable modernist designer Enzo Mari taught at the school in the 1970s.

The Humanitarian Society founded by Prospero Moisè Loria continues its activities today, still pursuing the original statutory purpose, which was to "enable the underprivileged, without distinction, to achieve a situation in which they could help themselves, and to work for the professional, intellectual and moral advancement of workers".

== Bibliography ==
- Massimo della Campa, Il Modello Umanitaria, Raccolto-Umanitaria, ISBN 88-87724-06-7, 2003 (in Italian)
- Claudio A. Colombo, Emanuela Scarpellini, Il palcoscenico insegna. Milano, l'Umanitaria, il Teatro del Popolo, Raccolto-Umanitaria, ISBN 978-88-87724-58-5, 2011 (in Italian)
- Massimo della Campa, Claudio A. Colombo, Spazio ai caratteri. L'Umanitaria e la Scuola del Libro, Raccolto-Umanitaria - Silvana Ed., ISBN 88-8215-889-6, 2005 (in Italian)
- Claudio A. Colombo, Quando l'Umanitaria era in via Solari. 1906, il primo quartiere operaio, Raccolto-Umanitaria 2006 (in Italian)
- Claudio A. Colombo, Una Casa per gli Emigranti. 1907, Milano, l'Umanitaria e i servizi per l'emigrazione, Raccolto-Umanitaria, ISBN 88-87724-24-5, 2007 (in Italian)
- Claudio A. Colombo, Maria Montessori e il sodalizio con l'Umanitaria, Raccolto-Umanitaria, ISBN 88-87724-27-X, 2008 (in Italian)
- Arturo Colombo, Il coraggio di cambiare. L'esempio di Riccardo Bauer, FrancoAngeli, ISBN 88-464-4030-7, 2002 (in Italian)
- Emanuela Scarpellini, Il Teatro del Popolo. La stagione artistica dell'Umanitaria tra cultura e società, FrancoAngeli, ISBN 88-464-2345-3, 2000 (in Italian)
- Enrico Decleva, Etica del lavoro, socialismo, cultura popolare: Augusto Osimo e la Società umanitaria, FrancoAngeli, ISBN 88-204-5323-1, 1984 (in Italian)
- Morris L. Ghezzi, Alfredo Canavero, Alle origini dell'Umanitaria: un moderno concetto di assistenza nella bufera sociale di fine '800 (1893-1903), Umanitaria, ISBN 978-88-87724-63-9, 2013 (in Italian)
- Claudio A. Colombo, Giuliana Nuvoli, Alessandrina Ravizza. La signora dei disperati, Raccolto-Umanitaria, Milano 2015, ISBN 978-88-87724-81-3 (in Italian)
