= Augusto Monti =

Italian writer and professor (1881–1966)

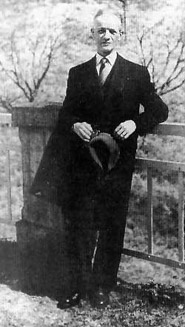

Augusto Monti (29 August 1881 in Monastero Bormida – 11 July 1966 in Rome) was an Italian writer and professor.

A strenuous opposer of fascism since its beginning, Monti was imprisoned by the regime. He directed the magazine Il Baretti from 1926 when the founder and director of the magazine, Piero Gobetti, died. During post-World War 2, he became an important representative of the world of Italian literature and pedagogy. He taught at Liceo Classico Massimo d'Azeglio in Turin. Among his students there were Cesare Pavese, Giulio Einaudi, Leone Ginzburg, Norberto Bobbio, and Massimo Mila.
