= Ada Gobetti =

Italian writer and politician

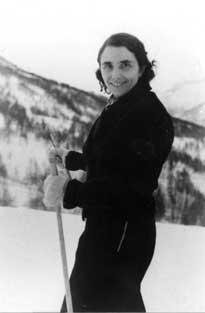
- Ada Gobetti
- Born: Ada Prospero; 23 July 1902; Turin, Kingdom of Italy
- Died: 14 March 1968 (aged 65); Turin, Italian Republic
- Occupations: Teacher, journalist
- Spouse(s): Piero Gobetti (died 1926) Ettore Marchesini (m. 1937)

Ada Gobetti (later Marchesini; née Prospero; 14 July 1902 – 14 March 1968) was an Italian teacher, journalist and anti-fascist leader.

== Biography ==
With her husband Piero Gobetti she contributed to several antifascist magazines, including La Rivoluzione Liberale which was suppressed in 1925 by the fascist dictatorship. Her husband was beaten by fascist squads and forced to go into exile in Paris, where he died of bronchitis in 1926. Benedetto Croce encouraged her to resume work. From 1928 she taught English language and literature and translated English texts. In 1937 she married Ettore Marchesini.

She helped the Biennio Rosso, kickstarted in Giustizia e Libertà and co-founded the Partito d'Azione. During the war Gobetti kept a diary that could have caused her death. To encrypt it she wrote it in English. This was the basis of her biography. She kept safe houses during the war. She was a leader in the Italian resistance movement and she co-founded the female group of partigiane, Gruppi di difesa della donna. After the end of the war, the CLN made her vice-mayor of Turin. In 1945 she co-founded the Women's International Democratic Federation. In 1946 she lost the election for vice mayor.

She directed her energy to child development and translated 26 letters that were designed to be sent to first-time parents based on Benjamin Spock's philosophy and they had been written by Dr Loyd Rowland and published by the Louisiana Society for Mental Health. Gobetti wanted children to be brought up differently to how they had been under the Italian fascists. In the 1950s she contributed to multiple left-wing and pedagogy publications, including L'Unità, Paese Sera and Educazione Democratica.

In 1956 she joined the Italian Communist Party.

== Death and legacy ==
She died in 1968 after a life dedicated to democracy and women's rights. On 2 October 1978 she was posthumously awarded the Silver Medal of Military Valour for her role in the anti-fascist resistance movement.

In the Florestano Vancini's film The Assassination of Matteotti (1973), Ada Gobetti is played by Manuela Kustermann.

== Works ==
In Italian

- Alessandro Pope. Il poeta del razionalismo settecentesco, Bari, Laterza, 1943
- Dai quattro ai sedici anni. Guida ai libri per ragazzi, Torino, Edizioni del Giornale dei genitori, 1960
- Cinque bambini e tre mondi. Torino, SAIE, 1953
- Non lasciamoli soli. Consigli ai genitori per l'educazione dei figli, Torino, La cittadella, 1958
- Diario partigiano. Torino, Einaudi, 1956, 1972 e 1996 ISBN 978-88-06-14230-8
- Storia del gallo Sebastiano ovverosia Il tredicesimo uovo, Torino, Einaudi, 1963
- Vivere insieme. Corso di educazione civica, Torino, Loescher, 1967
- Educare per emancipare. Scritti pedagogici 1953-1968, Manduria, Lacaita, 1982
- Piero Gobetti, Ada Gobetti. Nella tua breve esistenza. Lettere 1918-1926, Torino, Einaudi, 1991 ISBN 88-06-12536-2

In English

- Gobetti, Ada (2014). Partisan Diary: A Woman's Life in the Italian Resistance. Oxford University Press. ISBN 978-0-19-938054-1.

== Bibliography ==
- (in Italian) Mezzosecolo, 7, Annali 1987–1989, Centro Studi Piero Gobetti. Numero monografico sulla vita e l'opera di Ada Prospero Marchesini Gobetti.
- (in Italian) Emmanuela Banfo e Piera Egidi Bouchard Ada Gobetti e i suoi cinque talenti, Torino, Claudiana, 2014, ISBN 978-88-7016-976-8
