= La Rivoluzione Liberale =

Italian political magazine (1922–1925)

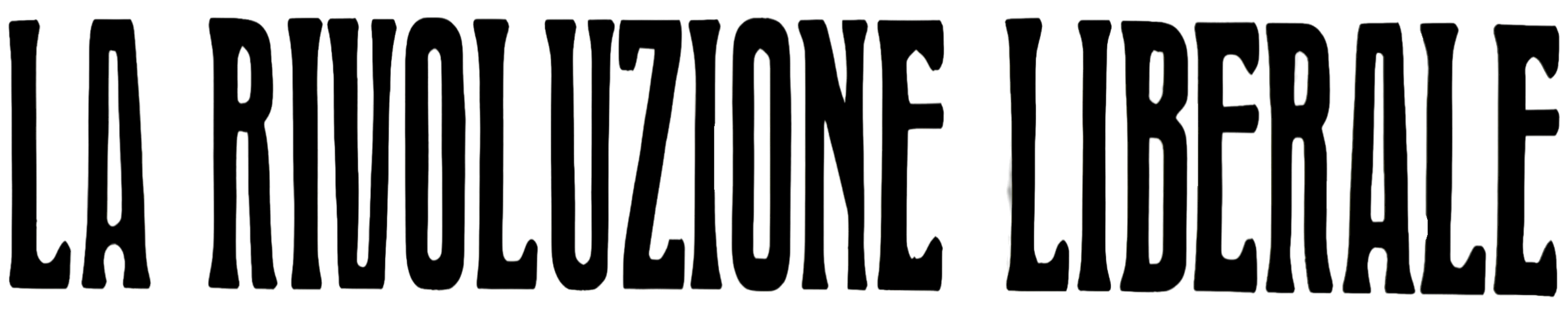

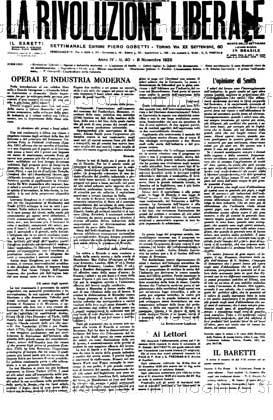
- Editor: Piero Gobetti
- Categories: Political magazine
- Frequency: Weekly
- Publisher: Einaudi
- Founder: Piero Gobetti
- Founded: 1922
- First issue: 12 February 1922
- Final issue: November 1925
- Country: Kingdom of Italy
- Based in: Turin
- Language: Italian

La Rivoluzione Liberale (Italian: Liberal Revolution) was an Italian anti-fascist liberal magazine, which was published on a weekly basis in Turin between 1922 and 1925. The magazine is mostly known for its founder Piero Gobetti.

== History and profile ==
La Rivoluzione Liberale was established in Turin by Gobetti in 1922, and the first issue appeared on 12 February that year. Gobetti also edited the magazine, which was published weekly by Luigi Einaudi. Its publisher was a small company that was owned by Gobetti.

In the first issue, La Rivoluzione Liberale declared itself as a forum for discussion of the problems concerning the political system and civic and cultural life of the Kingdom of Italy. It attempted to inform its readers about the origins of these problems and about Gobetti's theories of government, and his views on a new political synthesis. Gobetti employed the magazine as a vehicle to present a liberal revolution, which he argued that Italy had not experienced. One of the contributors was his wife Ada Gobetti.

Strongly draw Your Excellency’s attention to provocative language of newspaper Rivoluzione Liberale

— Benito Mussolini to the Prefect of Turin, 13 April 1924

Due to its opposition to Fascist Italy and its policies, the magazine was subject to frequent bans and was permanently closed in November 1925.

Gobetti continued his opposition to Italian fascist rule in another magazine, Il Baretti, which had been also founded by him.
