= Piero Gobetti =

Italian journalist and anti-fascist liberal socialist intellectual (1901–1926)

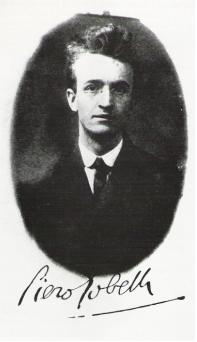
Gobetti, c. 1920

Piero Gobetti (Italian: [ˈpjɛːro ɡoˈbetti]; 19 June 1901 – 15 February 1926) was an Italian journalist, intellectual, and anti-fascist. A radical and revolutionary liberal, he was an exceptionally active campaigner and critic in the crisis years in Italy after the First World War and into the early years of Fascist Italy.

== Early life and education ==
Gobetti was born in Turin. A student of law at the University of Turin, he set up his own review Energie Nove (New Energies) in 1918. There, he promoted the cause of radical cultural and political renewal, aligning himself with the many critics of liberal parliamentary politics. Drawing upon the idealist philosophy of Benedetto Croce, Gobetti identified cultural change with a spiritual transformation that would unite public and private life. He also attached himself to causes such as educational reform and votes for women led by the independent deputy Gaetano Salvemini.

== Career ==
In 1920, Gobetti was influenced by Antonio Gramsci, fellow ex-student and Communist Party of Italy editor of the L'Ordine Nuovo (The New Order). Gramsci was the leading intellectual during the Biennio Rosso (1919–1920), a period of proletarian unrest in Turin that led to the factory occupations in September 1920. Inspired by the workers' movement and Gramsci's argument that they constituted a new revolutionary subject, Gobetti gave up editing Energie Nove in order to rethink his commitments.

In 1922, Gobetti began publishing a new review, La Rivoluzione Liberale (Liberal Revolution). Here, he expounded a distinctive version of liberalism, conceived as a philosophy of liberation rather than a party doctrine. Deeply moved by the Russian Revolution, which he understood as a liberal event, Gobetti conceived the working class as the leading subject of a liberal revolution. In seeking to take over the factories and govern themselves, he argued that the workers expressed a desire for autonomy and collective freedom that could renew Italy. According to Gobetti, liberals should understand the term liberal as adaptable to different classes and institutional arrangements other than the bourgeoisie and parliamentary democracy.

Italian resistance movement leader Ada Gobetti was his wife and contributed to La Rivoluzione Liberale as well as other magazines. Gobetti was highly attentive to the dangers of Benito Mussolini and the National Fascist Party, which entered government in October 1922. Whilst conservative liberals hoped to make temporary use of Mussolini's popularity in order to restore Parliament, Gobetti recognised the tyrannical orientation of fascism. He argued that Italian fascism represented the "autobiography of the nation", an accretion of all the ills of Italian society. In particular, he argued that fascism continued a political tradition of compromise, absorbing political opponents rather than allowing conflict to express itself openly, and that liberalism was anti-fascist insofar as, on his account, it recognised that liberty was achieved through struggle and conflict. In December 1924, Gobetti also began to edit a journal of European literary culture entitled Il Baretti. He used the journal to put into practice his idea of liberal anti-fascism and his conviction that the Italian people could learn to reject the insular nature of fascist culture by means of an education in European culture.

== Death and legacy ==
For his rigid opposition to fascism, Gobetti's review was closed down and he himself was assaulted by fascist thugs. He was beaten up in 1925 and escaped to Paris early the next year. He died at age 24 in Neuilly-sur-Seine of a heart attack in February 1926, perhaps brought on by the injuries he had received after the severe beating by fascist Blackshirts. He is buried in Père Lachaise Cemetery.

Following his death and despite his relatively few writings, Gobetti became a symbol of liberal anti-fascism, inspiring intellectuals such as Carlo Levi and Norberto Bobbio. In Florestano Vancini's film The Assassination of Matteotti (1973), Gobetti is played by Stefano Oppedisano.

== See also ==
- Classical radicalism
- Liberal socialism
- Social liberalism
- Francesco Ruffini
