= List of Partito d'Azione politicians =

A list of notable politicians of the Partito d'Azione of Italy:

== B ==
- Enzo Biagi
- Ranuccio Bianchi Bandinelli
- Nino Bixio
- Norberto Bobbio
- Giorgio Bocca
- Pietro Bucalossi

== C ==
- Piero Calamandrei
- Aldo Capitini
- Carlo Cassola
- Nicola Chiaromonte
- Carlo Azeglio Ciampi
- Tristano Codignola
- Lucio Colletti
- Enrico Cuccia

== D ==
- Francesco De Martino
- Guido De Ruggiero
- Francesco de Sanctis

== F ==
- Oriana Fallaci
- Vittorio Foa
- Franco Fortini

== G ==
- Leone Ginzburg

== L ==
- Ugo La Malfa
- Carlo Levi
- Primo Levi
- Emilio Lussu
- Joyce Lussu

== M ==
- Raffaele Mattioli
- Luigi Meneghello
- Eugenio Montale
- Augusto Monti

== P ==
- Luigi Pareyson
- Ferruccio Parri

== R ==
- Carlo Ludovico Ragghianti
- Ernesto Rossi

== S ==
- Luigi Salvatorelli
- Gaetano Salvemini
- Guido Seborga
- Altiero Spinelli

== V ==
- Leo Valiani
- Franco Venturi
- Bruno Visentini
- Edoardo Volterra

== Z ==
- Bruno Zevi
