= Carlo Muscetta =

Italian poet, literary critic and editor (1912–2004)

- Born: 22 August 1912; Avellino, Campania, Italy
- Died: 22 March 2004 (aged 91); Aci Trezza, Sicily, Italy
- Education: Naples; Florence
- Occupations: Poet; Literary critic Creator/editor of political magazines School teacher University professor
- Spouse(s): 1. Lucia Galeota; 2. Marcella Tedeschi
- Children: 2

Carlo Muscetta (22 August 1912 – 22 March 2004) was a poet who became better known as a literary critic and, later, as an editor of literary magazines. He also had a parallel career in teaching, employed as a university professor of Literature successively at Catania, Paris (as a "visiting professor") and Rome. During the 1960s and 70s he came to wider prominence as a free-thinking Marxist commentator.

== Biography ==
=== Provenance and early years ===
Carlo Muscetta was born and grew up at Avellino, a midsized town with a rich history, located approximately 50 kilometres (30 miles) inland to the east of Naples. Angelo Muscetta, his father, was an energetic businessman with a wide range of commercial interests. Between 1925 and 1928 he attended the Liceo Pietro Colletta (technical secondary academy) in Avellino, which according to one evidently unimpressed commentator might have led him to a career as a cost accountant. He then switched to the "Liceo classico Pietro Colletta" (secondary school) which held out the likelihood of a more academically oriented set of qualifications. While still living in Avellino he came to know Guido Dorso, who exercised a lasting influence on his thinking, both politically and more broadly.

=== Student and young school teacher ===
In 1931 he enrolled as a student at the University of Naples Literature faculty. He had already, as a teenager, established a "respectful" relationship with Benedetto Croce, to whom he frequently submitted written questions and from whom he received written answers. Croce is widely seen to have been instrumental in steering Muscetta towards literary criticism as a career path and historicism as an important philosophical prism. In 1932 he transferred to the University of Florence, where he was taught by Luigi Russo. He graduated in 1934, successfully concluding his student career with a dissertation, supervised by Luigi Foscolo Benedetto, concerning the nineteenth century literature scholar Francesco de Sanctis, a subject to which he returned in his subsequent writings. Muscetta returned to the south in 1935, settling in Molfetta, where he taught at the "istituto pubblico" (secondary school". It was during his time in Molfetta that he became friendly with the left-wing intellectual Tommaso Fiore. He was dismissed from his teaching post after he was overheard criticising the colonial war in Abyssinia, but found a new position at the "Istituto Di Cagno Abbrescia", a secondary school in nearby Bari through the intervention of Fiore.

There are indications that even when he was a literature student in Naples, during a period in which Italy was increasingly governed as a one-party dictatorship, there were members of the university who regarded Muscetta as politically suspect. He association with Benedetto Croce and others of a liberal mindset may have been one of the factors behind his transfer to Florence in 1932. Nevertheless, in 1937 he became a party member. (Party membership had been a precondition of application for a public sector position since, formally, 1933.)

=== Lucia Galeota ===
In April 1935 Carlo Muscetta married Lucia Galeota. The two had met at the University of Naples a few years earlier. The births of their sons Mara and Sergio followed in Bari (1936) and Pescara (1937).

In 1937 the couple relocated to Pescara (Abruzzo) where Muscetta had been offered a more secure (and better paid) job at a "scuola magistrale" (secondary school with a strong academic focus).

=== Rome ===
In 1939 Muscetta succeeded in obtaining a transfer to Rome, on the far side of the mountains. Here he began teaching Italian literature at the "Conservatorio di S.Cecilia". The job offer resulted from his participation, on 10 November 1939, in the government's "Littoriali" festival. He secured first place in the "Education Policy" competition category. The theme that year was "Independence of Italian literature". He also secured fourth place in the "culture and arts" category. He had decided to participate in "the games" because he was "tired of provincial life, and wanted to live in Florence or Rome". Meeting with the National Education Minister, Giuseppe Bottai led to the teaching job at the "Conservatorio di S.Cecilia". The politicised context of his arrival in Rome involved a sudden celebrity and/or notoriety within Rome's intellectual class. Sources imply, in addition, a certain ambiguity or fluidity about Muscetta's political attitudes during the later 1930s. He had "very publicly" abandoned his open hostility to the government in 1937, but would nevertheless, according to his own subsequent attestations, remained active as an "underground antifascist".

In Rome Muscetta quickly became part of a network of young literati. He teamed up with one of these, Mario Alicata, to compile and publish "Avventure e scoperte: nuove letture per i ragazzi italiani della scuola media", an anthology of "adventure and discovery stories", aimed at younger teenagers. In 1940, together with the antifascist journalist Giaime Pintor, Muscetta became a member of the judging commission for the "Prelittoriali", a sub-section of the annual "Littoriali" in which he had competed with such success in 1939. However, Muscetta took the idea of going along with fascism one step further, contributing during the early 1940s to the fortnightly literary magazine "Primato" which was launched in March 1940, and thereafter directed by Giuseppe Bottai, the Fascist Education Minister in Mussolini's government between 1936 and 1943. There are, indeed, references to Muscetta having found and shared words indicating "great intellectual admiration" for leading fascist hierarchs. Nevertheless, "Primato" was a literary journal for intellectual readers: not every article appearing in it was an unqualified paeon of praise for the Fascist government. After 1943, Muscetta was able to insist forcefully that he had never fully conformed, even in his contributions to "Primato", to the characterisation which he imputed to Velio Spano, that he had been seen as a "young redeemed anti-fascist" ("un giovane antifascista redento").

During these year Muscetta was simultaneously increasingly to be found among members of the conspiratorial antifascist circles associated with the Einaudi Publishing business. Fellow members of the circle included Giaime Pintor, Cesare Pavese and Leone Ginzburg, each of whom on occasion made their own contributions to "Primato". They also wrote regularly for La Ruota, a monthly magazine on literature and the arts which, following a two-year hiatus, was relaunched in 1940.

=== War years ===
As in the First World War, so in the second, the Italian government avoided military involvement for more than half a year following the outbreak of hostilities between the major power north of the Alps. When Mussolini signalled support for his Germany allies by means of a brief (and militarily inconsequential) invasion of France from the south in June 1940, there was a polarising impact on public opinion. Many who had managed to avoid displaying much interest in politics since 1922 now found themselves feeling the need to choose a side. Muscetta turned increasingly towards an intellectualised form of Marxism, though it is impossible to pin down quite when and to what extent his political opinions changed and crystallised.

He also became an "Azionista", part of a broadly based political association, with some of the features of a political party, and a shared focus on antifascist resistance. Another prominent activist member was Leone Ginzburg. During 1942/;43 the two men helped to set up "L'Italia Libera", an underground (at this stage) monthly newssheet presented as the party newspaper of the "Partito d'Azione" and produced in various places. Despite its being printed, initially, in tiny numbers, the circulation of L'Italia Libera grew, while its repute grew still more rapidly: it became an important source of encouragement and intellectual nurture for anti-government groupings and organisations throughout Italy. At a "Partito d'Azione conference" held in Florence in September 1943. it was determined that "L'Italia Libera" needed to become single nationally produced publication, produced in Rome. Various premises were used, including the basement at "Via Basento 55", a couple of hundred meters from the Villa Borghese in central Rome. This was where, by November 1943, the printing press had been installed. Following the arrest of Mussolini at the end of July 1943, relations between the replacement Italian government became increasingly fractious. It was only in September 1943, after the Italian government entered into an armistice with representatives of the Anglo-American armies advancing from the south, that the German army moved quickly to overwhelm the Italian army and install a German puppet state covering northern and central Italy. Rome therefore remained under something close to German military occupation between September 1943 and June 1944. That was the situation during the night of 18/19 November or 19/20 November 1943 (sources differ as to the date) when a substantial police detachment broke into the basement premises at "Via Basento 55", where another edition of L'Italia Libera was being produced. Those arrested included the newspaper's printers, contributing editors and distribution personnel, Muscetta and Ginzburg among them. Those arrested were all taken to the political offices of the "Questore" and subjected to the usual interrogation procedures. They were then transferred to Rome's celebrated/infamous Regina Coeli prison, while remaining available to their political interrogators. Their situation appeared grim, but all was not blackness: many years later a fellow inmate, Sandro Pertini would confide that whenever he came across Muscetta during the post-war decades he would think back to the image he retained in his mind of the literary critic from the Irpinia sitting on an upturned bucket robustly declaiming the stanzas of Orlando Furioso for the entertainment of fellow inmates in cell 339.

Becoming increasingly alarmed about their prospects, the men from "L'Italia Libera" appealed to Amedeo Strazzera-Perniciani, Chairman of the Prison Visitors' and Assistance Commission, who had been able to meet them on 10 December 1943 and was then evidently able to arrange subsequent contacts. At great personal risk, Strazzera-Perniciani gave them instructions to feign illness in order to secure transfer to the prison infirmary, thereby avoiding further interrogation sessions. He even urged them to resort to injections that triggered high fevers, in order to enhance/exacerbate their symptoms. Natalia Ginzburg and Lucia Muscetta submitted their own appeals to Strazzera-Perniciani, who undertook to look after their husbands; and he was able to take steps that prevented the two men from being picked up in a truck for transported to Germany. Leone Ginzburg nevertheless died at 8 in the morning on 5 February 1944 in the prison infirmary at the Regina Coeli. His causes of death were given as acute cholecystitis and cardiac paralysis. Carlo Muscetta survived. Later Muscetta would dedicate his scholarly study "Cultura e poesia di G. G. Belli" to Ginzburg. It was, in terms of copies sold, the author's most successful book.

During his period of detention Muscetta was assigned to work at the labour camps of Anzio and Nettuno, along the coast to the south of Rome. He was also sent to work at the barracks of the so-called "città militare" (army complex) at Rome-Cecchignola. As the armies that would liberate Rome from the south, the situation inside the city grew progressively more chaotic, and on 26 March 1944 Carlo Muscetta managed to escape. He "disappeared" into hiding, and resumed his activities as a contributing editor to L'Italia Libera.

=== New beginnings ===
Directly after the war ended Muscetta worked with increasing intensity for the Einaudi Publishing business. The would be no return to life as a school teacher. With effect from 4 January 1945 he was entrusted by Giulio Einaudi with the running of the firm's Rome office. On 18 March 1947, he horrified many of his comrades from the recently collapsed "Partito d'Azione" by letting it be known that he had joined the Communist Party. National election results at the end of that year indicated that, after more than two decades of Fascism, many Italians were reaching similar conclusions. Muscetta himself had reason to doubt the wisdom of his move just one week after he made it. On 25 March 1947 the Communist Party General Secretary, Palmiro Togliatti, disclosed that "his party" would be voting in support of ratifying what became Article 7 of the constitution: that meant supporting the inclusion of the 1929 Lateran Treaty in the new constitution. As a committed secularist, Muscetta questioned Togliatti's decision to vote for any hint of some alliance between church and state. His doubts about the accommodating approach that the Communist Party leadership in Italy took over various issues only intensified over the next few years.

=== Free spirited party member ===
In 1953 Muscetta was entrusted by Party Secretary Togliatti with the directorship of "Società", the party's review magazine on politics, arts and culture, published in Florence four times a year. The appointment, which provided a platform of significant influence among party members, was a joint one, shared with Gastone Manacorda. "Società" was in some respects a rival publication to "Rinascita", a monthly political and cultural magazine directed on behalf of the party by Togliatti himself between 1944 and 1964. In 1955 Muscetta published an essay of his own entitled "Metello e la crisi del neorealismo" ("Metello and the crisis of neorealism") which turned out to be problematic for him. "Metello" was a newly published novel by Vasco Pratolini, a twentieth century writer who was, it turned out, much admired by Togliatti. Muscetta failed, in his 30-page essay, to acknowledge Pratolini's novel as a manifesto for the new realism. With "Metello", Pratolini had, indeed, constructed a mediocre protagonist in a novel devoid of narrative. "Metello" had already proved controversial among party members, serving to highlight existing differences over the party's approach to literature. Muscetta, with his contribution in "Società", was rubbing at an open sore.

The difference of opinion with Togliatti over Pratolini's text did nothing to endear Muscetta to the highly centralised party leadership, but the real breaking point came just over a year later over the Soviet invasion of Hungary in October 1956. The party needed to take a position, and from the perspective of the leadership there was seemingly little choice other than to back the forces of Soviet Communism against the "Hungarian counter-revolutionaries". Many party members saw the matter differently. A number of high profile party intellectuals based at the Florence premises of the Einaudi Publishing business, of whom Muscetta was one, drafted and, along with a number of well-known "Rome intellectuals" signed the "Manifesto of the 101". The document was evidently intended as an internal discussion document, but was inevitably disclosed beyond the confines of the membership in due course. The "Manifesto" criticised the party leadership for "still not having formulated an open and meaningful condemnation of Stalinism", for having defined the uprising in Budapest as a counter-revolutionary insurrection, and deplored the Soviet intervention as a violation "of the principal of the autonomy of socialist states". From letters and biographical data that surfaced later, it is clear that Togliatti was bitterly angry. In retrospect, the Soviet invasion of Hungary and the reactions to it within the Italian Communist Party marked a serious and permanent split, even if the party suffered no obvious electoral damage at the time.

=== Former party member ===
Carlo Muscetta formally resigned from the party in July 1957, though the caustic spirit that had led him to join it ten years earlier remained undimmed. By most criteria Muscetta remained a sharp witted, and where appropriate sharp tongued, Marxist intellectual for the rest of his life.

The "Manifesto of the 101" and Muscetta's subsequent resignation had also involved a change of directors at Società. Muscetta's literary criticism and other articles now appeared in "Mondoperaio", a monthly "political review magazine", at that time under the direction of Francesco De Martino and Pietro Nenni. Both men were of the political left, but neither of them was any kind of a communist. Muscetta's contributions were, as before, predominantly of a political-cultural character. He also took on responsibility for the publication's "scientific-literary supplement". (Note: "...supplemento scientifico-letterario") In 1959, after breaking with Einaudi, he began to work with Feltrinelli, a Milan-based book publishing business. Here he set up a publishing programme which would involve re-issuing works "of cultural importance for reform in Italy": it resulted in the publisher's "Library of Italian Classics" series. During these years, possibly already in contemplation of a career switch towards the universities sector, he focused on a close study of Leopardi's fifteen year diary, Zibaldone. It was also at around this time, in 1961, that he published his lengthy book on the "Cultura e poesia di Giuseppe Gioachino Belli".

=== Catania ===
In November 1963 he accepted an appointment to join the Faculty of Literature at the University of Catania (Sicily), where he took charge at the Faculty of Modern Philology. His arrival at Catania faculty was quickly followed by an expansion of the teaching space allocated to the Italianists where researchers, students and teachers could come together to discuss new books, new teaching programmes, theories of learning and critical methodologies on a national and international scale. Faculty members were encouraged to publish at every level. The 1968 student protests marked a clear watershed, however. Student leaders looked to Muscetta as a source of spiritual inspiration and guidance, but of course they also took their cues from university protestors in the rest of Italy. Muscetta was entirely in favour of modernisation in terms of university life as a basis for rejuvenating teaching methods. But the protests also unleashed unhelpful changes in the relationship between students and teachers. The teaching body as a whole – including its most respected members – suffered a collective loss of perceived charismatic status. The informal but powerful pact that had existed between the more avant-garde of the professors and the students was suddenly worn out, not just in terms of cultural bonds and didactic empathy, but also on the political level more broadly. In the longer term the student protests ran out of steam, and after 1972 certain teachers and students in Catania "paid the price" following a succession of impressive electoral successes by individuals identified by pro-Muscetta commentators as part of the "fascist right". Muscetta's interest in the university and in the Catania more generally faded visibly.

It was during these years that he directed the publication of the monumental "Letteratura italiana: storia e testi per Laterza" series, comprising ten texts in twenty columns, for the Editori Laterza publishing house in Bari. He also sustained a steady stream of contributions to various daily newspapers and periodical magazines.

After he left the party in 1957, and during the 1960s, it becomes clear that Muscetta's theoretical literary method settled around three key interlinked concepts: (1) realism, (2) integral historicism and (3) what he termed the "militant character of criticism". He freely acknowledged Croce, De Sanctis and Gramsci as his underlying references points. His notion of realism was not to be identified with contemporary neorealism, but above all, in terms of recognising the capacity of the author to live the contradictions of his or her times. Integral historicism was to be interpreted in an activist sense, whereby fer the true intellectual commitment becomes a simple duty. His concept of militancy, when applied to literary criticism, could never be reduced to simple party-defined politics. Over the years he evolved a body of scholarship derived from these pillars that extended far beyond his substant5ial work on Giuseppe Gioachino Belli. Classical writers who came under his scrutiny included Petrarch, Boccaccio, Ariosto, Tasso, Leopardi, Manzoni, Foscolo, Monti and, among contemporary classics, Umberto Saba of Trieste.

Muscetta's work as a literary scholar also produced several significant translations, principally from French. He was still a young man when he produced an Italian version of "Le rivoluzioni d’Italia" by Edgar Quinet, published by Laterza in Bari in 1935. Many years later, in 1984, Muscetta's translation of "Les Fleurs du mal"/"I fiori del male" by Baudelaire – one of many versions in Italian – was also published by Laterza.

=== Paris and Rome ===
In October 1974 Muscetta accepted an appointment as a visiting professor at the Sorbonne University in Paris where he taught two one year courses, one on Petrarch and the other on Boccaccio. He would later describe his two years in Paris as "intellectually very lively" ("intellettualmente molto vivaci").

He left Paris in 1976 and made his home in Capalbio (Tuscany), a "medieval hill village" an hour or so north of Rome, which again became the focus of his professional life. In 1977 he accepted the professorial chair in "Sociology of Literature" ("sociologia della letteratura") and then, following the death of his colleague Carlo Salinari in 1977, that of "Italian Literature" at the Sapienza University in Rome.

Personal tragedy struck in 1979 with the death of his wife Lucia with whom he had been married since 1935. In 1980 he married Marcella Tedeschi, whom he would predecease and who would publish a posthumous volume comprising a selection of his letters and papers.

=== Later years ===
Carlo Muscetta retained his professorship at Rome till 1983, the year during which, having reached 70, he definitively retired from teaching. During May and June of that year he undertook what amounted to a series of farewell lectures at the University of Calabria at Arcavacata (Cosenza) on the nineteenth century patriot-poet Vincenzo Padula. In 1988 was granted honorary citizenship of Acri in recognition of his contributions to the cultural enrichment of Southern Italy and, in particular, Calabria.

During two decades of retirement Muscetta sustained contact with the intellectual networks of which he had become a part. The first edition of his book "L’erranza: memorie in forma di lettere" ("Wanderings: Memories in the form of letters") was published in 1992. It comprises 40 open letters addressed to his family and friends, and to important figures from the worlds of literature, politics and academe.

Carlo Muscetta died at Aci Trezza {Catania} on 22 March 2004. A substantial part of his library is now held in two rooms at the "Centro Dorso" in Avellino.

== Output (selection) ==
- Avventure e scoperte, Firenze, Sansoni, 1941
- Metello e la crisi del neorealismo (1955)
- Realismo e controrealismo (1958)
- Ritratti e letture (1961)
- Cultura e poesia in Giuseppe Gioachino Belli (1961)
- Giovanni Boccaccio (1972)
- Realismo, neorealismo, controrealismo (1976)
- Leopardi. Schizzi, studi e letture (1976)
- Gli eredi di Protopopov. Dissensi, consensi, indignazioni (1977)
- Studi sul De Sanctis (1980)
- Boccaccio (1981)
- Pace e guerra nella poesia contemporanea da Alfonso Gatto a Umberto Saba (1984)
- Versi e versioni (1986)
- Don Chisciotte in Sicilia. Pagine di letteratura militante (1987)
- Il Papa che sorrise al Belli (1989)
- Giudizio di valore, Pagine critiche di storicismo integrale (1992)
- L'erranza, memorie in forma di lettere (1992)
