= List of Italian lawyers =

This is an incomplete list of notable Italian lawyers:

== A ==
- Alberico Gentili
- Silvestro Aldobrandini
- Giorgio Ambrosoli

== B ==
- Olinto Barsanti
- Tina Lagostena Bassi
- Lelio Basso
- Mario Berlinguer
- Enzo Bianco
- Ivanoe Bonomi
- Mario Borghezio
- Giovanni Braschi

== C ==
- Sergio Campana (footballer)
- Ferdinando Carabba Tettamanti
- Alberto Caramella
- Giuseppe Lorenzo Maria Casaregi
- Roberto Cassinelli
- Michele Cianciulli

== D ==
- Enrico De Nicola
- Antonio Di Pietro
- Domenico Donna

== F ==
- Dario Franceschini

== G ==
- Luigi Gasparotto
- Niccolò Ghedini
- Pier Michele Giagaraccio
- Franzo Grande Stevens
- Guglielmo Gulotta

== I ==
- Mario Ielpo

== L ==
- Domenico Lanza

== O ==
- Angelo Oliviero Olivetti
- Leoluca Orlando

== P ==
- Carlo Palermo
- Giuseppe Palmisano
- Luca Pancalli
- Giuseppe Paratore
- Alfonso Pecoraro Scanio
- Carmine Pecorelli
- Camillo Porzio
- Cesare Previti
- Giuseppe Prisco

== R ==
- Guido Raimondi
- Attilio Ruffini

== S ==
- Giuseppe Saracco
- Mario Scaramella
- Francesco Spiera

== T ==
- Filippo Turati
- Alexandro Tirelli

== V ==
- Lelio Vittorio Valobra
- Gustavo Venturi
- Bruno Villabruna
- Bruno Visentini
