= Sion Segre Amar =

Sion Segre Amar (Turin, May 19, 1910– ibidem, September 4, 2003) was an Italian Jewish writer who survived the Holocaust when he fled to Mandatory Palestine in 1939.

He studied at the Liceo classico Massimo d'Azeglio and later natural sciences at the university. In 1934, he and other young men from Turin were stopped at the Swiss Italian border for having anti-fascist leaflets in their possession. During the fascist period, he was a member of the political party Giustizia e Libertà and in the 1960s he was the president of the Jewish Community in Turin. He was an avid collector and compiled one of the most important private collections of medieval manuscripts called the Comites Latentes . Several of his books he used to carry with him during his journeys. In the 1960s he began to buy manuscripts at Sotheby's in London, until his collection reached about 300 volumes. The collection was deposited for several years in the library of the University of Geneva.

== Biography ==
A graduate of the Liceo Classico Massimo d'Azeglio classical high school, he later enrolled in the faculty of natural sciences. During the fascist period he militated in the Giustizia e Libertà movement. He was arrested on March 11, 1934 on the Italian-Swiss border for trying to enter Italy with anti-fascist propaganda material. Along with him was Olivetti executive Mario Levi (brother of writer Natalia Ginzburg), who nevertheless managed to escape. Segre's arrest marked the beginning of a vast operation against suspects associated with the Turin-based Justice and Freedom group. These included Leone Ginzburg, Carlo Levi and his brother Riccardo, Gino and Giuseppe Levi (Mario's brother and father, respectively), Barbara Allason, Carlo Mussa Ivaldi Vercelli, Giovanni Guaita, Giuliana Segre, Marco Segre, Attilio Segre, Cesare Colombo, Leo Levi, and Camillo Pasquali. Sion Segre was sentenced to three years' imprisonment (later reduced to one), which he partly served in Rome together with Leone Ginzburg.

In 1939, he left for Palestine (region), remaining there until the end of World War II; returning to Italy after the war, he helped reform the structures of Italian Jewry, becoming, in 1960, president of a junta of the History of the Jews in Turin.

He is credited with establishing the collection known as “Comites Latentes,” comprising more than 300 medieval manuscripts and now housed at the Bibliothèque de Genève.

== Works ==
- Amico mio e non della ventura, 1990
- Il logogrifo,1990
- Il mio ghetto, 1996
