= Tettamanti =

Tettamanti is an Italian surname. Notable people with the surname include:

- Ezio Tettamanti (1938–2008), Italian footballer
- Ferdinando Carabba Tettamanti (born 1944), Italian lawyer
- Raúl Tettamanti (born 1956), Argentine rower
- Tito Tettamanti (born 1930), Swiss lawyer, politician, and entrepreneur
