= Romano Bilenchi =

Italian novelist, short story writer and essayist

Romano Bilenchi (9 November 1909 – 18 November 1989) was an Italian novelist, short story writer and essayist. He was born in Colle di Val d'Elsa. He was involved with the resistance movement during the Fascist rule of Benito Mussolini. He was also active in the Italian Communist Party after the war. He founded a magazine, Società, together with Cesare Luporini and Ranuccio Bianchi Bandinelli in 1945.

As a writer, Bilenchi published novels, short stories and essays. He won the Viareggio Prize in 1972. His literary friends included major 20th-century figures like Eugenio Montale and Ezra Pound.

He died in Florence in 1989.

== Works ==
=== Fiction ===
- Vita di Pisto, Torino, Il Selvaggio, 1931.
- Cronaca dell'Italia meschina, ovvero Storia dei socialisti di Colle, Firenze, Vallecchi, 1933.
- Il capofabbrica. Racconti, Roma, Circoli, 1935.
- Mio cugino Andrea, Firenze, Vallecchi, 1936.
- Anna e Bruno e altri racconti, Firenze, Parenti, 1938.
- Conservatorio di Santa Teresa, Firenze, Vallecchi, 1940.
- La siccità:racconti, Firenze, Edizioni di rivoluzione, 1941; nuova ed., binomiale: La Siccita'-La Miseria, Firenze, Vallecchi, 1944.
- Dino e altri racconti, Firenze, Vallecchi, 1942.
- Racconti, Firenze, Vallecchi, 1958.
- Una città, Galatina (Lecce), Pajano, 1958.
- Il bottone di Stalingrado, Firenze, Vallecchi, 1972.
- Il processo di Mary Dugan e altri racconti, Torino, Einaudi, 1972.
- La rosa non finita, Firenze, Pananti, 1980.
- Il gelo, Milano, Rizzoli, 1982. Translated as The Chill
- Gli anni impossibili, contiene: La siccità, La miseria, Il gelo, Milano, Rizzoli, 1984. ISBN 88-17-79005-2.
- Pomeriggio. Due racconti, Siena, Taccuini di Barbablù, 1985.
- I tedeschi. Racconto, Milano, All'insegna del pesce d'oro, 1985. ISBN 88-444-1018-4.
- L'attentato, Firenze, Pananti, 1986.
- Maria, Prato, Comune di Prato, 1986.
- Due ucraini e altri amici, Milano, Rizzoli, 1990. ISBN 88-17-66048-5.
