= Bruna Polimeni =

Italian photographer (born 1934)

- Born: 14 July 1934 (age 92); Genoa, Italy
- Occupation: Photographer
- Known for: Documentary photography particularly for her photos of Amílcar Cabral

Bruna Polimeni (née Amico, born 7 July 1934) is an Italian photographer. She is best known for her photographs of independence movements in Portuguese African colonies, notably a series of photographs of Amílcar Cabral, the leader of nationalist movements in Guinea-Bissau and Cape Verde and the war of independence in Guinea-Bissau. She has also published several books of photographs on other topics.

== Early life and education ==
Polimeni was born Bruna Amico in Genoa in Italy on 14 July 1934, staying there until the early 1960s. In 1962, she moved to Rome and worked for various newspapers to gain experience of graphic design and photography.

== Portuguese colonies ==
Bruna Polimeni's first photographs of Cabral probably date back to 1965, when the two met in Accra. In January 1969, in Khartoum, Sudan, she participated as a photographer in the International Conference in Support of the Peoples of Portuguese Colonies and Southern Africa, sent by the Italian socialist magazine Mondo Operaio. There she had the opportunity to meet the leaders of the liberation movements, including Cabral, Agostino Neto from Angola, and Eduardo Mondlane from Mozambique. She sent photographs of the conference to the leaders of the liberation movements of Guinea Bissau and Cape Verde, starting relations that are still ongoing.

In 1970, during a similar conference, this time held in Rome, she met Cabral again. On that occasion, she decided to make her first trip to the parts of Guinea-Bissau that had already been liberated, with the aim of documenting the birth of the new state and disseminating her images. The conference was notable for the decision of Pope Paul VI to meet with Cabral, Neto, and Marcelino dos Santos from Mozambique, causing Portugal to withdraw its ambassador to the Vatican.

On her visit to Guinea-Bissau in 1970 and 1971, she accompanied Cabral on his visits to the liberated territory. She visited the political-military school and stayed at the pilot school, photographed schools and health services, and documented the conference of the African Party for the Independence of Guinea and Cape Verde (PAIGC), held in Boké in Guinea, close to the border with Guinea-Bissau. Polimeni was the only Italian photographer to document the unilateral proclamation of independence of Guinea Bissau, which took place on 24 September 1973 in Madina do Boe. Her photographs were widely distributed, with help from the Italian Communist Party, with which she was close.

In October 1978 she was invited to Cape Verde to document the reforestation work aimed at stopping desertification, as well as the works aimed at encouraging agricultural production. At the international symposium held in Praia, Cape Verde in January 1983 to remember the tenth anniversary of Cabral's assassination, she organized a photographic exhibition dedicated to Cabral. Other exhibitions have included one held in Coimbra, Portugal as part of the 50th anniversary celebrations of the Carnation Revolution in Portugal in 1974, which led to independence in Portugal's colonies.

== Other activities ==
In Italy, she continued to report on politics and society. She promoted the publication of a large photographic collection of Italian newspapers published all over the world by the Italian emigrant community. She travelled extensively and published books of photographs on New York City (1987), Tunisia (with Abdelaziz Daoulatli, 1997), Petra (with Brigitte Sedlaczek, 1997). Morocco (with El Moutawassit Moha, 1991), Denmark "Country of Fairytales" (with Eva Kampmann, 1993), and Malta (with Aldo E. Azzopardi, 1995).

== Archives ==
Polimeni donated part of her archives to the Basso Foundation in 2012 and has continued to add to the collection.

== Awards and honours ==
In 2006, in recognition of the work she carried out during the campaign for the independence of Guinea-Bissau and Cape Verde, she was awarded the Amílcar Cabral medal, the highest civil decoration of Cape Verde.
