= Antonio Giuliano =

Italian archaeologist and academic

Antonio Giuliano (1930 – 16 June 2018) was an Italian classical archaeologist and academic.

== Biography ==
Giuliano was a pupil of Ranuccio Bianchi Bandinelli and had been university professor since 1967, he contributed in the 1970s to the institution of the Ministry for Cultural Heritage and the founding of the Xenia magazine.

He was an academic of the Accademia dei Lincei and author of works on classical formalism such as History of Greek Art (1989); he was also interested in the figure of Giacomo Leopardi. He died in Rome on 16 June 2018 after a brief illness, leaving the 4,600 volumes of his personal library to the Accademia dei Lincei.
