= Lucio Colletti =

Italian Western Marxist philosopher

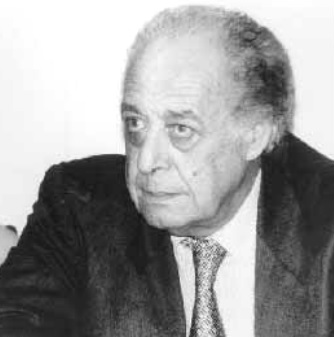
- Lucio Colletti in 1996

Member of the Chamber of Deputies
- In office 9 May 1996 – 3 November 2001
- Constituency: Lombardy 1 (1996–2001); Veneto 2 (2001)

Personal details
- Born: 8 December 1924 Rome, Italy
- Died: 3 November 2001 (aged 76) Campiglia Marittima, Italy
- Party: PdA (1943–1947); PCI (1949–1964); Independent (1964–1994); FI (1994–2001)

Academic background
- Education: Sapienza University of Rome
- Academic advisor: Carlo Antoni
- Influences: Galvano Della Volpe

Academic work
- Discipline: Philosophy
- Sub-discipline: Political philosophy
- School or tradition: Western Marxism (early)

Lucio Colletti (Italian: [ˈluːtʃo kolˈletti]; 8 December 1924 – 3 November 2001) was an Italian Western Marxist philosopher. Colletti started to be known outside Italy because of a long interview with him that Marxist historian Perry Anderson published in the New Left Review in 1974.

== Biography ==
Colletti studied philosophy at the Sapienza University of Rome, where he earned a laurea with a thesis entitled La logica di Benedetto Croce (The Logic of Benedetto Croce), which was supervised by Carlo Antoni. Inspired by the Western Marxist philosopher Galvano Della Volpe, he then gravitated towards communism. Colletti was well known as a critic of Hegelian idealism and later became a noted critic of Marxism. He wrote the foreword for the Italian edition of Alfred Schmidt's The Concept of Nature in Marx.

Colletti changed his political beliefs very often and abandoned many of his early Marxist ideals. Having been a member of the anti-fascist Action Party (Partito d'Azione; PdA) in his youth, he joined the Italian Communist Party (PCI) in 1949 and emerged as an important cultural party figure. In 1964, Colletti left the PCI because the party's break with its semi-Stalinist past was leading towards what he called, in his view, a "patently rightward direction." In the 1970s he was among the supporters of Socialist leader Bettino Craxi. From 1996 until his death he was elected on the list of Forza Italia, Silvio Berlusconi's right-wing political party, as a member of the Chamber of Deputies in the Italian parliament.

== Selected publications ==
- The Manifesto of 101
- "The Theory of the Crash". Telos, 13 (Fall 1972). New York: Telos Press.
- 1972 (1974) From Rousseau to Lenin
- 1973 (1979) Marxism and Hegel

Awards
Preceded by Paul Walton and Andrew Gamble	Deutscher Memorial Prize; 1973	Succeeded by Maxime Rodinson
