= Vittorio Foa =

Italian politician, trade unionist, and writer (1910–2008)

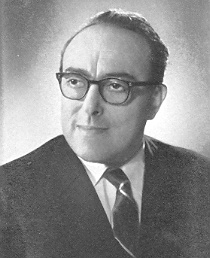
- Vittorio Foa in the 1970s

Member of the Senate of the Republic
- In office 2 July 1987 – 22 April 1992
- Constituency: Piedmont

Member of the Chamber of Deputies
- In office 25 June 1953 – 4 June 1968
- Constituency: Turin

Member of the Constituent Assembly
- In office 25 June 1946 – 31 January 1948
- Constituency: Italy at-large

Personal details
- Born: 18 September 1910 Turin, Italy
- Died: 20 October 2008 (aged 98) Formia, Italy
- Party: PdA (1942–1947); PSI (1947–1964); PSIUP (1964–1972); PdUP (1972–1978); DP (1978–1987); PCI (1987–1991); PDS (1991–1998); DS (1998–2007); PD (2007–2008)
- Occupation: Journalist, politician, trade unionist

Vittorio Foa (18 September 1910 – 20 October 2008) was an Italian politician, trade unionist, journalist, and writer who was one of the founding fathers of the Italian Republic and a key figure of the political left. A libertarian and liberal socialist of the non-communist Italian left, he took part to the Italian Resistance against fascism and in the post-war years was a member of the Constituent Assembly of Italy from 1946 to 1948. As a member of several socialist parties, he was elected to the Chamber of Deputies from 1953 and 1968 and to the Senate of the Republic from 1987 to 1992.

== Early life and education ==
Foa was born on 18 September 1910 in Turin into a middle-class Jewish family. For his sixth form and senior high school studies, he attended Liceo Classico Massimo d'Azeglio, where two sports and cultural institutions like Juventus and Einaudi were born and where other key figures who were contemporaries of Foa, such as Giulio Carlo Argan, Norberto Bobbio, Giorgio Colli, Leone Ginzburg, Primo Levi, and Massimo Mila, also studied. In 1931, Foa graduated in law from the University of Turin and worked in a bank.

== Political career ==
=== Anti-fascism and post-war years ===
In 1933, Foa joined Giustizia e Libertà, a liberal and liberal socialist anti-fascist political movement. He was arrested by the OVRA (the Italian fascist secret police) in May 1935 and was condemned to 15 years in prison. He shared his cell with Riccardo Bauer, Mila, and Ernesto Rossi. Prior to his arrest, he had collaborated on the weekly magazine of the same name and on the magazine Quaderni di GL, which was published in Paris. Foa was released in August 1943, embracing the liberal political thought of Benedetto Croce. He joined the Italian resistance movement and entered the Action Party (Partito d'Azione, PdA), becoming the secretary together with Ugo La Malfa, Emilio Lussu, Oronzo Reale, and Altiero Spinelli. As a PdA member, he was involved with the National Liberation Committee (Comitato di Liberazione Nazionale, CLN).

On 2 June 1946, Foa was elected a member of the Constituent Assembly, and he also became one of the 75 members of the Commission for the Constitution. Foa's name was linked to articles 39 and 40 of the Constitution of Italy dealing with the freedom of trade union organization. When the PdA dissolved in 1947, Foa joined the Italian Socialist Party (Partito Socialista Italiano, PSI), becoming one of its national leaders, and was elected a member of the Chamber of Deputies in 1953 and again in 1958 and 1963.

=== Trade unionism and autonomism ===
In 1948, Foa dedicated to trade union activity, joining the Italian Federation of Metalworkers (Federazione Impiegati Operai Metallurgici, FIOM). In 1949, he joined the left-wing trade union of Giuseppe Di Vittorio, the Italian General Confederation of Labour (Confederazione Generale Italiana del Lavoro, CGIL), and became an influential and highly charismatic trade union leader. In October 1949, he joined the national secretariat of the CGIL, for which he held the position of deputy secretary of the research office. He was the CGIL's confederal secretary from 1957 to 1970. In 1959, he collaborated with the magazine Passato e presente, which was directed by Carlo Ripa di Meana with the help of Antonio Giolitti, and Foa quickly emerged as one of the greatest theorists of workers' autonomy, inspiring with his theses the birth of workerism (operaismo) years later. In 1961, he wrote the first editorial of Raniero Panzieri's Quaderni Rossi.

A leading intellectual of the non-communist left, Foa supported the anti-authoritarian and libertarian socialist theory of autonomism for the working class, the theory of socialism from below, which would later inspire the foundation of several extra-parliamentary leftist groups of which Foa was to become a member, including the Italian Socialist Party of Proletarian Unity (Partito Socialista Italiano di Unità Proletaria, PSIUP), the Proletarian Unity Party (Partito di Unità Proletaria, PdUP), and Proletarian Democracy (Democrazia Proletaria, DP), of which he was the co-founder after the dissolution of the PSIUP in 1972.

=== From the Italian Socialist Party to Proletarian Democracy ===
A deputy from 1953 to 1964 for the PSI, Foa was re-elected from 1964 to 1968 for the PSIUP. In 1964, the split to the left wing of the PSI led to the birth of the PSIUP, of which Foa became national leader. He collaborated with the newspaper La Sincata in 1966 and then in 1969 with il manifesto, the newspaper that was born from a further split, this time within the PCI. For a short period, Foa was part of the newspaper's management. In 1970, he chose to leave politics, the CGIL, and the PSIUP to retire to private life.

In 1972, the PSIUP suffered an electoral defeat, following which it decided to disband. As a result, Foa and other socialists founded the new PSIUP, which merged into the PdUP, of which he once again became national leader. The idea was to give governmental space to extra-parliamentary left-wing political forces in order to bring them into government by diverting them from the revolutionary vision. In 1974, the PdUP unified with the Manifesto group, with which began the promotion of a new political party that led to the foundation of the DP in 1975. In 1976, Foa collaborated with the Quotidiano dei lavoratori, a newspaper advocating for workers' self-management and autonomy. He again left politics, with his last public intervention in January 1980 at the DP congress, where he promised not to deal with politics "for at least four years".

=== Historical research and publishing ===
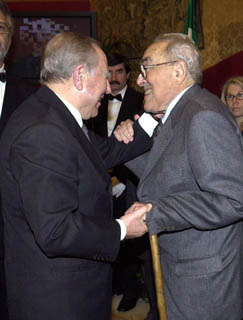
Foa (right) with the then Italian president Carlo Azeglio Ciampi (left) at a convention in 2001

At the end of the 1970s, Foa left the trade union and political life to devote himself to historical research and publishing. He taught Modern History at the University of Modena and Reggio Emilia and the University of Turin, and researched the history of the working class and the trade unions. Publications of this period include La Gerusalemme rimandata. Domande di oggi agli inglesi del primo Novecento (1985), a study of English working-class movements at the beginning of the 20th century. Foa published numerous books, partly autobiographical, including La struttura del salario (1976), Per una storia del movimento operaio (1980), La cultura della CGIL (1984), Il cavallo e la torre (1991), Questo Novecento (1996), Le lettere della giovinezza (1998), Lavori in corso (1999), and Passaggi (2000). From his Il silenzio dei comunisti (2002, in collaboration with Miriam Mafai and Alfredo Reichlin), a theatrical adaptation was created by Luca Ronconi and included in the Domani project, a series of shows created on the occasion of the 2006 Winter Olympics in Turin. Foa's non-fiction writings in the 2000s continued with Un dialogo (2002, an interview by Carlo Ginzburg), La memoria è lunga (2003, in collaboration with Federica Montevecchi), and Il linguaggio del tempo (2004).

In the late 1980s, Foa played an active part in the re-thinking of the Italian left and took a keen interest in the debates within the Italian Communist Party (Partito Comunista Italiano, PCI). In 1987, he was elected a member of the Senate of the Republic from the PCI's list of candidates, and until 1992 was seated among the Independent Left group. In 1991, he supported the transformation of the PCI into the Democratic Party of the Left (Partito Democratico della Sinistra, PDS), and joined the PDS. In 1992, Foa retired from politics, dividing his time between Rome and Formia, and focused on publishing. Despite this, he joined and supported The Olive Tree (L'Ulivo) and the Democrats of the Left (Democratici di Sinistra, DS) led by Romano Prodi and Piero Fassino. One of his last public appearances took place in 2002 when he joined a rally of the Girotondi, a spontaneous anti-Berlusconi civil movement that developed between 2002 and 2003 in several Italian cities, including one held in Rome at Piazza San Giovanni in Laterano.

Defined as the critical voice of the Italian left, Foa devoted his life to Italian and European politics in their widest sense, and constantly expressed his confidence in the young. From the role of the trade unions to the place of science in our contemporary society, his interests embraced crucial aspects of modern life and society. In 2005, Foa received best wishes for his 95th birthday from the then Italian president Carlo Azeglio Ciampi. In 2007, Foa joined the Democratic Party (Partito Democratico, PD), having taken part at its founding congress, supporting Walter Veltroni. In his last essay, Le parole della politica (2008, in collaboration with Montevecchi), Foa analyzed the degradation of politics and its lexicon, reflecting on the process of emptying the meaning of political language and on the structural reasons that they succumb; in the same year, a contribution by him appeared in Bruno Trentin's volume Lavoro e libertà. Scritti scelti e un dialogo inedito con Vittorio Foa e Andrea Ranieri.

== Death and legacy ==
Foa died in Formia on 20 October 2008 after a long illness; the news of his death was given by Veltroni, the then PD leader who described it as "an immense pain". On 21 October 2008, Italian newspapers were filled with tributes to Foa. In La Repubblica, Mafai recalled his impatience when asked what the beleaguered Italian left should do. Mafai recalled Foa as saying: "It's a waste of time and sense to try to define a leftist identity. You have to do what is right and necessary for the country. It is up to posterity to decide whether it came from the right or the left." He is considered a protagonist of the 20th century, a free and restless man. In 2010, on the occasion of the centenary of his birth, the volume Scritti politici. Tra giellismo e azionismo (1932-1947), edited by Chiara Colombini and Antonio Ricciardi were published, along with the prison letters Lettere della giovinezza, edited by Montevecchi. In 2018, his daughter Anna published the text La Famiglia F., a historical-family narrative in which she reconstructed the life path of her parents.

Unlike other trade unionists who were passionate about association football and Juventus, such as Luciano Lama, whom Foa saw as pragmatic and reformist, he preferred chess. As an avid chess player, he viewed the game not simply as a hobby but as a space for both strategic reflection and political discussion, such that chess played a central role in his personal and intellectual life. He became known for the "horse move" (mossa del cavallo), which Foa loved to encourage and was described as "the surprise to be reserved for the interlocutor, the tear in the clothes that the potential opponent would like to sew on us." Foa was also known for a quote (Se aveste vinto voi, io sarei ancora in prigione. Siccome abbiamo vinto noi, tu sei senatore) that he uttered during a television show to then senator Giorgio Pisanò, a voluntary of Decima Flottiglia MAS in the Italian Social Republic and member of the neo-fascist Italian Social Movement (Movimento Sociale Italiano, MSI). In a 2009 interview with the historian Isabella Insovibile, Foa recalled the episode by stating that Pisanò was making "grand speeches of pacification" (quoting him as saying "Deep down, we were all patriots... Each of us had our homeland in our hearts..."), at which point he interrupted him to explain "a fundamental difference", elaborating: "Wait a moment. If we're talking about the dead, fine. The dead are dead: let's respect them all. But if we're talking about when they were alive, they were different. If you had won, I'd still be in prison. Since we won, you're a senator."

== Selected works ==
- Riprendere tempo. Un dialogo con postilla (1982, with Pietro Marcenaro)
- La cultura della CGIL. Scritti e interventi 1950-1970 (1984)
- La Gerusalemme rimandata. Domande di oggi agli inglesi del primo Novecento (1985)
- Il difficile cammino del lavoro (1990, with Vittorio Rieser)
- Il cavallo e la torre. Riflessioni su una vita (1991)
- Le virtù della Repubblica (1994, with Paul Ginsborg)
- Del disordine e della libertà. Padre e figlio tra incertezze e speranze (1995, with Renzo Foa)
- Il sogno di una Destra normale (1995, with Furio Colombo)
- Questo Novecento (1996)
- Lettere della giovinezza. Dal Carcere, 1935-1943 (1998, edited by Federica Montevecchi)
- Lavori in corso, 1943-1946 (1999, edited by Federica Montevecchi)
- Il tempo del sapere (2000, with Andrea Ranieri)
- Il ritorno dell'individuo. Cosa cambia nel lavoro e nella politica (2000, with Massimo Crosti)
- Passaggi (2000)
- Sulle montagne (2002)
- Il silenzio dei comunisti (2002, with Miriam Mafai and Alfredo Reichlin)
- Un dialogo (2003, with Carlo Ginzburg)
- La memoria è lunga (2003, with Federica Montevecchi)
- Il linguaggio del tempo (2004, with Valter Casini)
- Cent'anni dopo. Il sindacato dopo il sindacato (2006, with Guglielmo Epifani)
- Le parole della politica (2008, with Federica Montevecchi)
- Lavoro e libertà. Scritti scelti e un dialogo inedito con Vittorio Foa e Andrea Ranieri (2008, with Bruno Trentin)
- Scritti politici. Tra giellismo e azionismo (1932-1947) (2010, edited by Chiara Colombini and Andrea Ricciardi)
- Lettere della giovinezza (2010, edited by Federica Montevecchi)

== Electoral history ==
Election	House	Constituency	Party	Votes	Result
1946	Constituent Assembly	Italy at-large	PdA	–	Elected
1948	Chamber of Deputies	Turin–Novara–Vercelli	FDP	32,191	Not elected
1953	Chamber of Deputies	Turin–Novara–Vercelli	PSI	15,906	Elected
1958	Chamber of Deputies	Turin–Novara–Vercelli	PSI	15,202	Elected
1963	Chamber of Deputies	Turin–Novara–Vercelli	PSI	16,079	Elected
1987	Senate of the Republic	Piedmont – Turin Fiat Aeritalia	PCI	93,745	Elected
