= Guido Cortese =

Italian lawyer and politician (1908–1964)

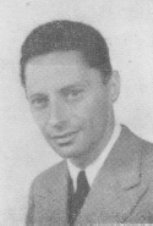

Minister of Industry and Commerce
- In office 6 July 1955 – 19 May 1957
- Prime Minister: Antonio Segni

Personal details
- Born: 3 August 1908 Naples, Kingdom of Italy
- Died: 3 September 1964 (aged 56) Cortina d'Ampezzo, Italy
- Party: Italian Liberal Party
- Spouse: Amelia Cortese Ardias
- Children: 4
- Occupation: Lawyer; Journalist

Guido Cortese (3 August 1908 – 3 September 1964) was an Italian lawyer and politician. He was a member of the Italian Liberal Party. He served at the Constituent Assembly after the end of Fascist rule and was a member of the Parliament for three terms. He was also minister of industry and commerce in the first Segni Government between 1955 and 1957.

== Early life and education ==
Cortese was born in Naples on 3 August 1908. He received a degree in law in 1930.

== Career ==
Following his graduation, Cortese formed a law company and worked as a lawyer specializing in criminal law. He started his political career after the end of Fascist rule. He worked for a Naples-based weekly publication Libertà in 1944. The same year he began to wrote for Il Giornale and was its deputy director until 1957.

Cortese was a member of the Italian Liberal Party and was elected as a deputy to the Constituent Assembly on the list of the National Democratic Union on 2 June 1946. He became a deputy in June 1953, from the constituency of Naples. He was re-elected as a deputy in the 1958 and 1963 elections. His term at the Parliament lasted until his death in September 1964.

Cortese was appointed minister of industry and commerce on 6 July 1955 to the cabinet of Antonio Segni, which he held until 19 May 1957. He was elected as a councillor of Naples in 1960 and 1962.

== Personal life, death and legacy ==
Cortese married Amelia Ardias in Naples in 1943. They had four children. He died in Cortina d'Ampezzo at the age of 54 on 3 September 1964 after a brief illness.

A foundation, the Guido and Roberto Cortese Foundation, was established in memory of him and his son in Naples in 1990.
