= Luciano Pellicani =

Italian sociologist and journalist (1939–2020)

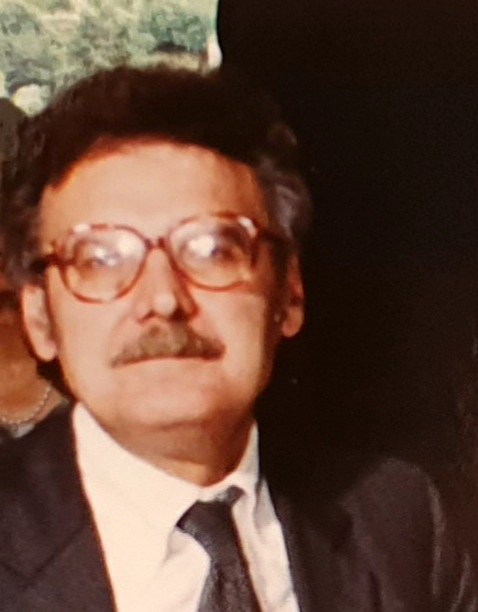
Photo of Pellicani

Luciano Luigi Pellicani (10 April 1939 – 11 April 2020) was an Italian sociologist, journalist and university professor.

== Academic career ==
Pellicani was born in Ruvo di Puglia. He was awarded a degree in Political Science from the University of Rome in 1964. In 1971 he obtained a degree in Political Sociology and in 1981 became a professor of that subject. He has taught at the University of Urbino and at the University of Naples.

In 1984 he became Professor of Political Sociology at the Faculty of Political Science at LUISS.

In 1985 he became Director of the journal Mondoperaio.

== Political career ==
Pellicani was a collaborator of the Italian Socialist Party and then the Italian Democratic Socialists. In 2006 he was a candidate for the Italian senate for the Rose in the Fist coalition of parties.

== Publications ==
His essay "The Genesis of Capitalism and the Origins of Modernity" was translated to English and published by Telos Press in 1994.

"Revolutionary Apocalypse: Ideological Roots of Terrorism" was published by Praeger in 2003.

In 2005, his essay "Ortega y el homo ludens" was published in the journal Revista de Occidente

== Death ==
Pellicani died from COVID-19 in 2020.
