= First Segni government =

11th government of the Italian Republic

Segni I Cabinet
- 11th Cabinet of Italy

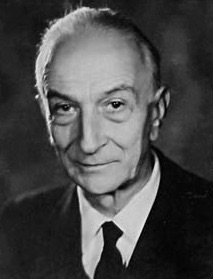
- Date formed: 6 July 1955
- Date dissolved: 20 May 1957

People and organisations
- Head of state: Giovanni Gronchi
- Head of government: Antonio Segni
- Total no. of members: 20
- Member parties: DC, PSDI, PLI; External support: PRI
- Status in legislature: Coalition government
- Opposition parties: PCI, PSI, PNM, MSI, PMP

History
- Legislature term: Legislature II (1953–1958)
- Predecessor: Scelba Cabinet
- Successor: Zoli Cabinet

The Segni I Cabinet was the 11th cabinet of the Italian government which held office from 6 July 1955 until 20 May 1957, for a total of 683 days, or 1 year, 10 months and 13 days.

Following the resignation of the previous government, chaired by Mario Scelba and caused by internal clashes with the DC and by the PRI's refusal to return to the government, the President of the Republic Gronchi, on 26 June 1955, instructed Antonio Segni to start consultations with the parties to explore the possibilities of the formation of a new government and, having obtained the approval of the DC, PSDI and PLI and external support from the PRI, on 2 July, he was entrusted with the task of forming the new government. The program was presented first to the Chamber which, on 18 July, approved the motion of confidence with 293 votes in favor and 265 against while, in the Senate, it was approved on 22 July with 121 votes in favor and 100 against.

Following the departure of the PSDI from the government, Segni presented his resignation to Gronchi on 6 May 1957.

== Government parties ==
The government was composed by the following parties:

| Party | Ideology | Leader |
|---|---|---|
| Christian Democracy (DC) | Christian democracy | Amintore Fanfani |
| Italian Democratic Socialist Party (PSDI) | Social democracy | Giuseppe Saragat |
| Italian Liberal Party (PLI) | Liberalism | Giovanni Malagodi |

== Party breakdown ==
- Christian Democracy (DC): prime minister, 14 ministers and 31 undersecretaries
- Italian Democratic Socialist Party (PSDI): deputy prime minister, 3 ministers and 5 undersecretaries
- Italian Liberal Party (PLI): 3 ministers and 4 undersecretaries

== Composition ==
| Office | Name | Party | Term |
|---|---|---|---|
| Prime Minister | Antonio Segni | DC | 6 July 1955–20 May 1957 |
| Deputy Prime Minister | Giuseppe Saragat | PSDI | 6 July 1955–20 May 1957 |
| Minister of Foreign Affairs | Gaetano Martino | PLI | 6 July 1955–20 May 1957 |
| Minister of the Interior | Fernando Tambroni | DC | 6 July 1955–20 May 1957 |
| Minister of Grace and Justice | Aldo Moro | DC | 6 July 1955–20 May 1957 |
| Minister of Budget | Ezio Vanoni | DC | 6 July 1955–20 May 1957 |
| Minister of Budget | Adone Zoli | DC | 6 July 1955–20 May 1957 |
| Minister of Finance | Giulio Andreotti | DC | 6 July 1955–20 May 1957 |
| Minister of Treasury | Silvio Gava | DC | 6 July 1955–31 January 1956 |
| Minister of Treasury | Ezio Vanoni (ad interim) | DC | 31 January 1956–16 February 1956 |
| Minister of Treasury | Giuseppe Medici | DC | 16 February 1956–2 July 1958 |
| Minister of Defence | Paolo Emilio Taviani | DC | 6 July 1955–20 May 1957 |
| Minister of Public Education | Paolo Rossi | PSDI | 6 July 1955–20 May 1957 |
| Minister of Public Works | Giuseppe Romita | PSDI | 6 July 1955–20 May 1957 |
| Minister of Agriculture and Forests | Emilio Colombo | DC | 6 July 1955–20 May 1957 |
| Minister of Transport | Armando Angelini | DC | 6 July 1955–20 May 1957 |
| Minister of Post and Telecommunications | Giovanni Braschi | DC | 6 July 1955–20 May 1957 |
| Minister of Industry and Commerce | Guido Cortese | PLI | 6 July 1955–20 May 1957 |
| Minister of Foreign Trade | Bernardo Mattarella | DC | 6 July 1955–20 May 1957 |
| Minister of Merchant Navy | Gennaro Cassiani | DC | 6 July 1955–20 May 1957 |
| Minister of State Holdings | Giuseppe Togni | DC | 2 March 1957–20 May 1957 |
| Minister of Labour and Social Security | Ezio Vigorelli | PSDI | 6 July 1955–20 May 1957 |
| Minister of Labour and Social Security | Adone Zoli (ad interim) | DC | 6 July 1955–20 May 1957 |
| Minister for the Fund for the South (without portfolio) | Pietro Campilli | DC | 6 July 1955–20 May 1957 |
| Minister for Parliamentary Relations (without portfolio) | Raffaele De Caro | PLI | 6 July 1955–20 May 1957 |
| Minister for Public Administration Reform (without portfolio) | Guido Gonella | DC | 6 July 1955–20 May 1957 |
| Secretary of the Council of Ministers | Carlo Russo | DC | 6 July 1955–20 May 1957 |
