= Ranuccio Bianchi Bandinelli =

Italian archaeologist and historian

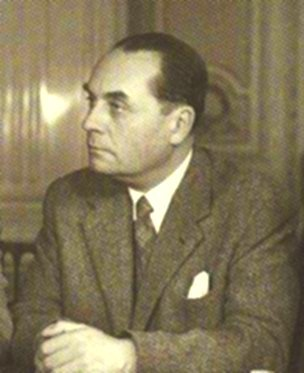
- Ranuccio Bianchi Bandinelli in 1949
- Born: 19 February 1900; Siena, Kingdom of Italy
- Died: 17 January 1975 (aged 74); Rome, Italy
- Occupation: Roman archaeologist
- Known for: Roman archaeology and art history

Ranuccio Bianchi Bandinelli (19 February 1900 – 17 January 1975) was an Italian archaeologist and art historian.

== Biography ==
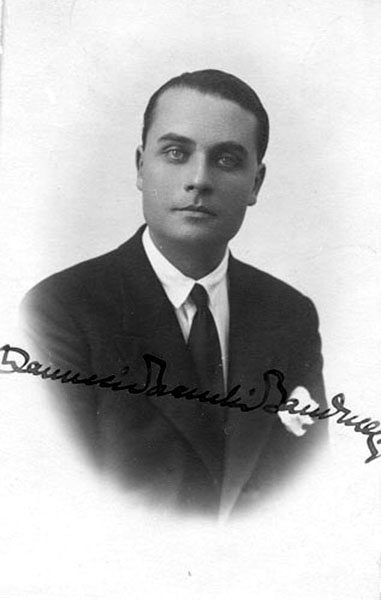
Ranuccio Bianchi Bandinelli c. 1920s

Bianchi Bandinelli was born in Siena to Mario Bianchi Bandinelli (1859–1930) and Margherita Ottilie "Lily" von Korn (Bianchi Bandinelli, 1878–1905), who were descended from ancient aristocracy in Siena. His early research focused on the Etruscan centers close to his family lands, Clusium (1925) and Suana (1929). Disgusted with Italian fascism, despite being the man who showed Hitler around Rome under Mussolini, he converted to communism after World War II and became a Marxist. He founded a magazine, Società, together with Cesare Luporini and Romano Bilenchi in 1945.

As an anti-fascist, he was appointed to a number of important art-historical positions immediately after the war. For example, he was director of the new government's fine arts and antiquities ministry (Antichità e Belle Arti, 1945–48). His memoir of fascism in Italy was published in 1995 (Hitler e Mussolini, 1938: il viaggio del Führer in Italia).

== Career ==
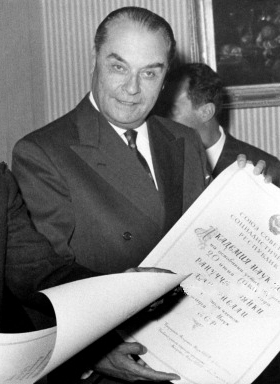
Ranuccio Bianchi Bandinelli receiving a foreign member diploma from the Soviet Academy of Sciences at the Soviet Embassy in Rome, October 1959

From his chairs at the universities of Florence and Rome, Bianchi Bandinelli directed a new breed of Italian archaeologists sensitive to classical history based upon dialectical materialism. He also taught at the University of Groningen in the Netherlands. In the 1950s and 1960s he undertook the writing of comprehensive texts on classical art intended to reach a wide and literate audience. He founded the Enciclopedia dell'arte antica in 1958, and in the same year was elected as a foreign member of the Soviet Academy of Sciences. In the mid-1960s, Bianchi Bandinelli was commissioned to write the two volumes on Roman art for the French Arts of Mankind series. These works brought his writing to a larger audience and helped usher in social criteria for art into a larger and English-speaking audience. In 1967 he founded the Dialoghi di archeologia with his students, one of the most innovative, if controversial, periodicals on classical archaeology.

He was frequently a maverick in his interpretation of art and his arguments were, if not always compelling, forcefully grounded. One such case is his interpretation of the famous Belvedere Apollo, a Roman copy of a Greek work now thought to date to the fourth century B.C. Although hailed by most art historians as a copy of the original work by the Greek master Leochares, Bianchi Bandinelli characterized the piece as a frigid copy of a Hellenistic work without relation to Leochares.

One of his interests was the interrelation between Hellenistic, Etruscan and Roman art. His students included some of the most influential Italian archaeologists of the 20th century, among whom were Giovanni Becatti, Antonio Giuliano, Mario Torelli, Andrea Carandini and Filippo Coarelli.

Bianchi Bandinelli was elected a foreign member of the Royal Netherlands Academy of Arts and Sciences in 1966.

== Publications ==
1. Clusium: Ricerche archeologich e topografiche su Chiusi il suo territorio in età etrusca (1925)
2. La critica d'arte (journal publisher from 1935, editor and co-founder)
3. Apollo di Belvedere (1935)
4. Storicità dell'arte classica (1950)
5. Nozioni di storia dell'archeologia e di storiografia dell'arte antica: lezioni introduttive del corso di archeologia (1952)
6. Enciclopedia dell'arte antica, classica e orientale (1958–1966, editor)
7. Arte etrusca e arte italica (1963, editor)
8. The Buried City: Excavations at Leptis Magna (1966, editor)
9. Roma: L'arte romana nel centro del potere (Rome: The Center of Power, 500 B.C. to A.D. 200., 1969)
10. Roma: La fine dell'arte antica (Rome: The Late Empire, Roman Art A.D. 200–400, 1970)
11. L'Arte dell'antichità classica (1976, directed).
12. Dialoghi di archeologia (serial, editor)
13. Hitler e Mussolini, 1938: il viaggio del Führer in Italia (1995)

== Sources ==
- Kleinbauer, W. Eugene. Research Guide to the History of Western Art. Sources of Information in the Humanities, no. 2. Chicago: American Library Association, 1982, pp. 137–8
- Barzanti, Roberto. Ranuccio Bianchi Bandinelli: archeologo curioso del futuro. Siena: Protagon, 1994
- Barbanera, Marcello. Ranuccio Bianchi Bandinelli e il suo mondo, Bari, Edipuglia / Università degli studi di Roma "La Sapienza", 2000.
- Barbanera, Marcello. Ranuccio Bianchi Bandinelli: biografia ed epistolario di un grande archeologo. Milan: Skira, 2003.
