= Giuseppe Lorenzo Maria Casaregi =

Italian jurist (1670–1737)

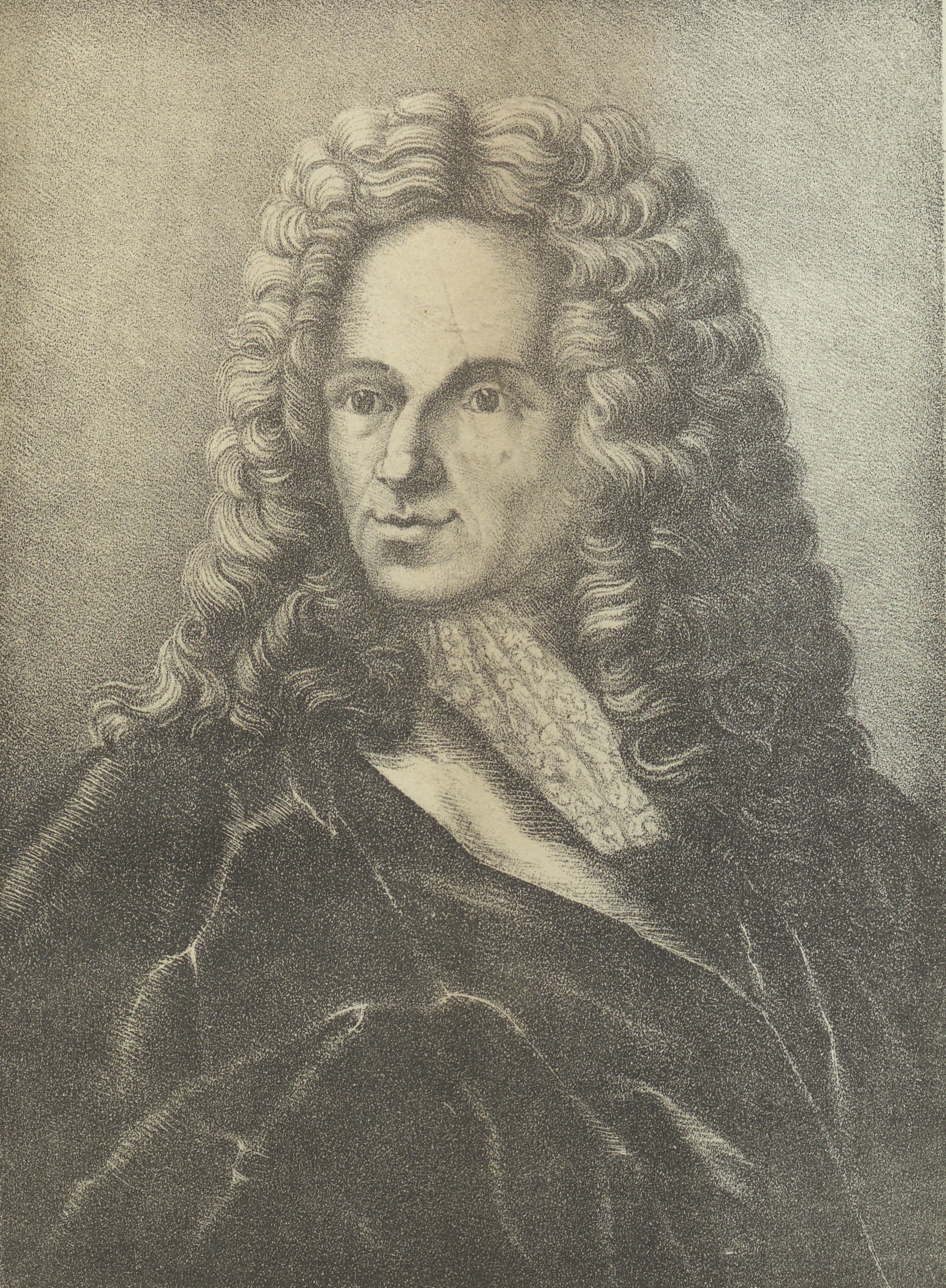

Giuseppe Lorenzo Maria Casaregi (1670–1737) was an Italian jurist whose research on promissory notes, insurance, endorsement and sea trade law influenced the European evolution of the Law Merchant.

After studies in Pisa, he worked there as advocate and jurisconsult until 1717, when he was called to the Rota of Siena, then to that of Florence. His principal works include the Elucubrationes ac resolutiones (1691), Il Consolato del mare (1719), Il Cambista istruito (1723) and the multi-volume Discursus legales de commercio (1707, 1719, 1729), a collection of leading commercial cases. His complete works were published in 1740.
