= Antonio Giolitti =

Italian politician (1915–2010)

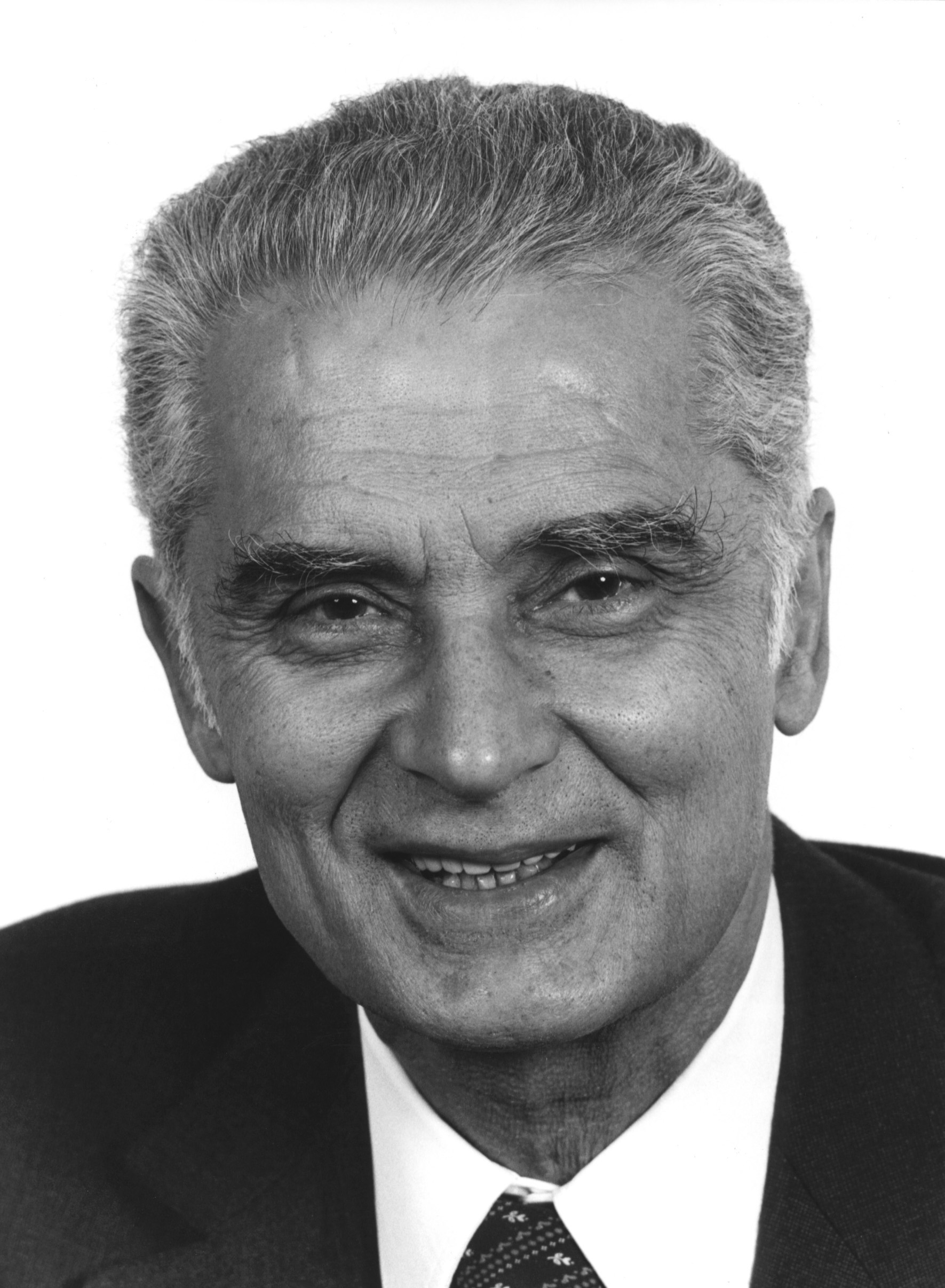
- Official portrait, 1980

European Commissioner for Regional Policy
- In office 6 January 1977 – 5 January 1981
- President: Roy Jenkins; Gaston Thorn
- Preceded by: George Thomson
- Succeeded by: Grigoris Varfis

Minister of Budget of Italy
- In office 7 July 1973 – 23 November 1974
- Prime Minister: Mariano Rumor
- Preceded by: Paolo Emilio Taviani
- Succeeded by: Giulio Andreotti
- In office 27 March 1970 – 17 February 1972
- Prime Minister: Mariano Rumor; Emilio Colombo
- Preceded by: Giuseppe Caron
- Succeeded by: Paolo Emilio Taviani
- In office 4 December 1963 – 22 July 1964
- Prime Minister: Aldo Moro
- Preceded by: Giuseppe Medici
- Succeeded by: Giovanni Pieraccini

Personal details
- Born: 12 February 1915 Rome, Italy
- Died: 8 February 2010 (aged 94) Rome, Italy
- Party: PCI (1940–1957; since 1987); PSI (1957–1985)
- Relations: Giovanni Giolitti (grandfather)

Military service
- Allegiance: Italian resistance movement
- Battles/wars: World War II (WIA)

Antonio Giolitti (12 February 1915 – 8 February 2010) was an Italian politician and cabinet member. He was the grandson of Giovanni Giolitti, the well-known liberal statesman of the pre-fascist period who served as Prime Minister of Italy five times.

== Biography ==
Giolitti was born in Rome. He joined the Italian Communist Party (Italian: Partito Comunista Italiano, or PCI) in 1940 and was arrested and tried by the fascist regime but acquitted, for his associations with them.

In the spring of 1943 Giolitti resumed his clandestine activities for the Communist Party, contacting numerous military and political personalities, in order to plan the overthrow of the fascist regime. During the Italian Resistance in World War II, Giolitti was seriously wounded in combat. He was sent to France to recover, and was not able to return to Italy until after the end of the conflict.

After the war, Giolitti was involved in much political activity: he was junior minister to the foreign minister for Ferruccio Parri's government, communist deputy to the Constituent Assembly, elected to the Chamber of Deputies in the list of PCI in 1948 and 1953. In 1957 he left the Communist Party after the Soviet suppression of the Hungarian uprising and the Manifesto of the 101. He then joined the Italian Socialist Party.

Antonio Giolitti was a minister in several Italian governments. He was Minister for the Budget from 1963 to 1964, from 1969 to 1972 and from 1973 to 1974 in the governments led, respectively, by Aldo Moro, Mariano Rumor and Emilio Colombo. In this capacity he inspired the Italian economic planning. From 1977 to 1985, he was a member of the Executive Commission of the European Economic Community in Brussels, and responsible for Regional Policy.

In 1987, Giolitti left the Italian Socialist Party following disagreements with its leader Bettino Craxi. He then returned to the Italian Communist Party (PCI) as an independent candidate and he was elected to the Italian Senate. At the end of the parliamentary term, he withdrew from active politics.

Antonio Giolitti has written political texts and, in 1992, he published a book with his memoirs.

He also participated actively to the Italian cultural activity. In his youth, he was an advisor to the publisher Giulio Einaudi. He collaborated with several cultural magazines, including Lettera Internazionale.

In 2006, he was awarded the Cavaliere di Gran Croce, the highest honour bestowed by the President of the Italian Republic. He died in Rome on 8 February 2010.
