= Alexandro Tirelli =

Italian lawyer (born 1970)

Alexandro Maria Tirelli
- Born: July 30, 1970 (age 56); Naples, Italy
- Education: University of Turin, University Carlo Cattaneo
- Occupation: Lawyer

Alexandro Maria Tirelli (born July 30, 1970) is an Italian lawyer. He is the president of the Criminal Chambers of European and International Law, an Italian association of criminal defense lawyers founded in 2017.

== Early life and education ==
Tirelli was born in Naples on July 30, 1970, and grew up in Castellammare di Stabia in the Naples metropolitan area. He is a member of the Tirelli family. He spent part of his youth in Latin America. He attended the Liceo Classico Massimo d'Azeglio in Turin, then graduated in law from the University of Turin and obtained a master's degree in business and economic law from the University Carlo Cattaneo in Castellanza. He also worked briefly as an executive in the export sector.

He taught international public law as a contract professor at the Sergio Arboleda University in Colombia..

Alexandro Tirelli is a member of the Italian branch of the Tirelli (Tirel or Tyrell) family, a Norman lineage traditionally associated with Walter Tirel (Gautier Tirel). He is also president of the Tirelli Foundation, which holds the historic Tirel Triptych, an artwork proposed as a gift to the British royal family.

== Career ==
Tirelli has spoken publicly about having lived in Medellín, Colombia, beginning in his youth, and about his personal acquaintance with the family of Pablo Escobar. He was the attorney for the Spadafora family in their legal action against Manuel Noriega over the murder of Hugo Spadafora.

In 2014, Tirelli represented the Archdiocese of Rio de Janeiro against RAI over the use of the image of Christ the Redeemer in an advertisement.

In 2017, he founded the Criminal Chambers of European and International Law, an association of Italian criminal defense lawyers.

In 2019, he represented Andrey Smyshlyaev, a Russian businessman arrested near Lake Como under an international warrant issued by Russia.

In 2024, he was elected president of the Istituto Superiore Stupefacenti, an institute that trains lawyers in national and international narcotics law.

In December 2025, he represented Victor Khoroshavtsev, a 73-year-old Russian oil businessman and former parliamentarian arrested on Christmas Day at a hotel near Malpensa Airport on an Interpol-relayed Russian warrant alleging a €110 million pension-fund fraud. Khoroshavtsev was released the following day by the Milan Court of Appeal.

== Bibliography ==
- Il diritto di Estradizione (Extradition Law)
- Il traffico degli Stupefacenti (Drug Trafficking)
- Il ruolo dell'avvocato Internazionalista nella gestione delle crisi internazionali (The Role of the International Lawyer in Managing International Crises)
- Il Processo Penale negli Stati Uniti d'America (The Criminal Process in the United States of America)
- Extradition Law
- Le Trafic de Stupéfiants en Droit Italien (Drug Trafficking under Italian Law — French)
- Drug Trafficking under Italian Law
- Il Sistema Giuridico di Gibilterra (The Legal System of Gibraltar)
- The Legal System of Gibraltar
- The International Lawyer
