= Manifesto of the 101 =

Manifesto of dissent among Italian communists to the Soviet invasion of Hungary

The Manifesto of the 101 was a document expressing strong dissent from the Soviets following the Soviet invasion of Hungary in October 1956. It was signed by 101 prominent Italian communists.

== History ==
After the Budapest uprising and its repression by the Red Army, the manifesto was signed by 101 Italian communist intellectuals. The document, known as "Il Manifesto dei 101", was conceived and initially drafted by philosopher Lucio Colletti and historians Luciano Cafagna and Francesco Sirugo, all three members of the Italian Communist Party (PCI). It was co-signed by 98 more intellectuals, among whom were historians Renzo De Felice and Alberto Caracciolo, and strongly endorsed by Antonio Giolitti, a leading personality and member of the Italian Parliament.

The manifesto was submitted to the Direction Bureau of the PCI with the intent of initiating an internal debate on the Budapest events. It was leaked to the press and provoked a brutal reaction by the party's leadership and the Direction Bureau; any debate attempt was rejected while the document's authors, labelled as "traitors", were threatened with heavy political consequences. First worried by the public diffusion of the manifesto, then more seriously intimidated by the party leadership's reaction, a few of the signatories retracted their adhesion while others, who refused to do so, resigned. Giolitti left the party the following year. This episode of dissent was followed by a more general re-thinking on the legitimacy of communism and its compatibility with democracy and intellectual freedom. Among the manifesto's promoters, some (Cafagna, De Felice, Sirugo, and Colletti) ended up, although at different stages, cutting ideological ties with communism.
