= Giovanni Braschi =

Italian politician and lawyer

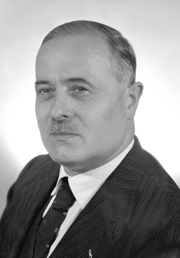

Minister of Post and Telecommunications
- In office 6 July 1955 – 15 May 1957
- Prime Minister: Antonio Segni
- Preceded by: Gennaro Cassiani
- Succeeded by: Bernardo Mattarella

Member of the Senate
- In office 8 May 1948 – 4 January 1959

Member of the Constituent Assembly
- In office 25 June 1946 – 31 January 1948

Member of the Chamber of Deputies
- In office 1921–1926

Personal details
- Born: 27 February 1891 Mercato Saraceno, Italy
- Died: 4 January 1959 (aged 67) Faenza, Italy
- Party: Christian Democracy
- Education: University of Bologna
- Profession: Politician, lawyer

Giovanni Braschi (27 February 1891 – 4 January 1959) was an Italian politician and lawyer.

== Biography ==
He was born into a Catholic family of timber traders, attended secondary schools in Cesena and high school studies in Faenza; in July 1919 he graduated in law at the University of Bologna with a thesis on the concept of "perpetual peace" of Kant and Rousseau. He volunteered in infantry at the outbreak of World War I, obtained the rank of lieutenant, was taken prisoner in one of the attempts to conquer Sasso Stria in the south-eastern Dolomites and imprisoned first in Austria and then in Hungary.

After the World War I he was provincial secretary of the Forlì branch of the People's Party and was among the leaders of the Italian Confederation of Workers.

He was elected to the Chamber of Deputies in 1921 and in 1924. He was declared declined from his office in 1926, with the advent of the fascist regime. He was arrested on 2 December 1943. Once out of prison he moved to the Northern Italy, where he participated in the anti-fascist struggle in the formations of the newly formed Christian Democratic Party.

After the World War II, in 1946, he was elected member of the Constituent Assembly. From 6 February to 31 May 1947 he was Undersecretary for Finance and Treasury with responsibility for war damage in the 3rd De Gasperi Government.

In 1948 he was appointed Senator by right for having taken part in three legislatures and because he was declared declined from the mandate in 1926. He remained a senator until his death. From 1955 to 1957 he served as Minister of Post and Telecommunications in the First Segni Government.
