= Franco Venturi =

Italian historian, essayist and journalist

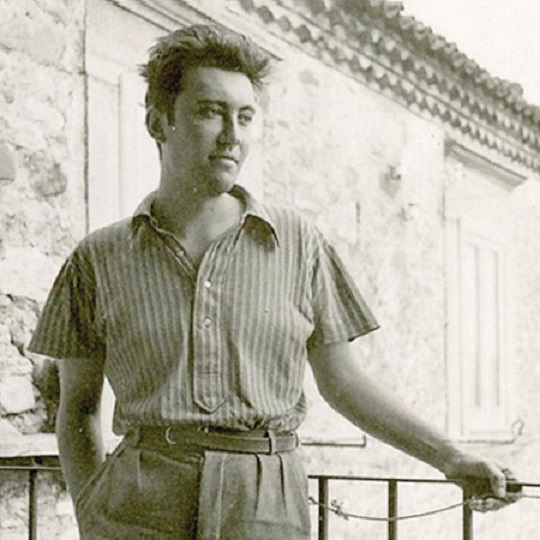

Franco Venturi (Rome, 1914 - Turin, December 14, 1994) was an Italian historian, essayist and journalist, a scholar of the Enlightenment in Italy and of the history of Russia, and an anti-fascist active in the Resistance.

== Life ==
In 1915, the year after Venturi was born, his father Lionello Venturi, having had his frustration reach its maximum point, decided to start another family in Turin where he won the competition to fill the chair of Film Director at the University. The younger Venturi attended Liceo classico Cavour and during the Resistance and later was active in the ranks of the Action Party; he was captured and subjected to confinement in Avigliano between 1941 and 1943.

== Career ==
Venturi's greatest achievement is his multivolume work Settecento Riformatore, of which three volumes have been translated into English under the general series title The End of the Old Regime in Europe

- The End of the Old Regime in Europe, 1768-1776: The First Crisis
- The End of the Old Regime in Europe, 1776–1789, I: The Great States of the West
- The End of the Old Regime in Europe, 1776–1789, II: Republican Patriotism and the Empires of the East

In addition, he published a volume of his selected essays, under the title Italy and the Enlightenment: Studies in a Cosmopolitan Century. In 1969, he gave the G. M. Trevelyan lectures at Cambridge University, published in 1971 as Utopia and Reform in the Enlightenment.

Other than his work on the Enlightenment, Venturi made his greatest contributions in the field of 19th-century Russian history, concentrating on the history of ideas:

- Roots of Revolution: A History of the Populist and Socialist Movements in 19th Century Russia
- Studies in Free Russia

== Influence ==
The Italian philosopher and sociologist of religions Edoardo Grendi discussed a PhD dissertation on the Benedetto Croce aesthetics under the supervision of Venturi, before moving to the London School of Economics where he was already working on the history of British labour movement between the 189th and the 20th century. Grendi continued the studies of Gabriel Le Bras to investigate statutes and real life of the Roman Catholic local and lay confraternities. He affirmed they weren't originated by the ecclesiastical hierarchy, but by a natural process of group devotion which made lay confraternities the main center of the Ligurian popular spirituality until the suppression decreed by Napoleon in the Enlightenment century.
