= Società =

Italian communist cultural magazine (1945-1961)

- Categories: Cultural magazine
- Frequency: Quarterly (1945-1954); Bimonthly (1954-1961)
- Founder: Ranuccio Bianchi Bandinelli; Cesare Luporini; Romano Bilenchi
- Founded: 1945
- Final issue: 1961
- Country: Italy
- Based in: Florence; Rome
- Language: Italian

Società (Italian: Society) was an Italian communist cultural magazine published in Italy between 1945 and 1961.

== History and profile ==
Società was founded as a quarterly magazine in Florence in 1945. The founders were Ranuccio Bianchi Bandinelli, Cesare Luporini and Romano Bilenchi. Bandinelli also directed the magazine. In 1948 the magazine became closer to the Italian Communist Party (PCI), but was not published by the party. The headquarters was later moved to Rome, and in 1954 its frequency was switched to bimonthly.

Società featured Italian fiction and poetry and occasionally included some essays on the theater and the cinema. It was one of the publications read by the Italian intellectuals, who had Gramscian views. Giorgio Napolitano was one of the regular contributors of the magazine. The magazine folded in 1961.
