= Mondoperaio =

Italian cultural magazine

- Editor: Luigi Covatta
- Categories: Politics, Culture
- Founder: Pietro Nenni
- Founded: 1948
- First issue: December 4, 1948
- Country: Italy
- Based in: Rome
- Language: Italian
- Website: https://www.mondoperaio.net/

Mondoperaio is an Italian cultural-political journal that is based in Rome, Italy. The magazine has a socialist stance.

== History and Overview ==
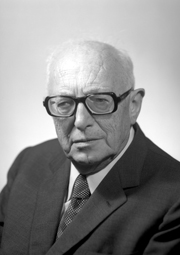
Pietro Nenni

The magazine began on 4 December 1948 as Mondo Operaio, on the initiative of the former Italian minister of foreign affairs and Italian Socialist Party (PSI) leader Pietro Nenni.

A constant presence among the political-cultural journals following World War II, the review intended to intervene mainly on issues of foreign policy. It was published fortnightly until 1953, at which point it became a monthly periodical. An organ of the PSI, the journal was enriched with new themes that would find a place at the Socialist Congress in Turin (1955) focusing in particular on the dialogue with Catholics.

In the first issue of 1956, Francesco De Martino became the co-editor (Pietro Nenni would be the editor-in-chief until 1958) and, with the editorial "Prospettive della politica socialista", set new tasks for the magazine. Until 1959 he focused on the issues of Stalinism and the relationship between socialism and democracy, with the help of the then new young co-editor Raniero Panzieri. His editorship also enriched the themes of cultural interest and published texts by Balzac, Brecht and Blasco Ibáñez. A scientific-literary insert was written by Carlo Muscetta and Carlo Castagnoli between March and December 1958. In 1959 Nenni passed sole leadership of the magazine to De Martino.

In the literature pages there was critical input from emerging writers such as Giorgio Bassani, Franco Fortini, Joseph Petronio, Pier Paolo Pasolini, Alberto Asor Rosa and others. In 1973 a new director was appointed, Federico Coen. The journal continued to host debates that sought a transformation in Italian political culture: in 1975 Norberto Bobbio criticized Marxist doctrine of the state; in 1976 Massimo L. Salvadori criticized the Gramscian doctrine of hegemony; while in 1977 Giuliano Amato opened a discussion on the need for institutional reform.

In 1985 Luciano Pellicani became the new director. In 1994 the magazine suspended its publications as a result of the dissolution of the PSI but in 1998, headed by the former Minister Claudio Martelli, the journal was re-established by the Italian Democratic Socialists (SDI) until 2000 when a new editorial, book format and identity was formed, based on liberal and secular roots, with a special emphasis on pro-Europeanism. Among the signatures: Francesco Forte, Giorgio Ruffolo, Gino Giugni, Luciano Cafagna, Stefano Rodotà, Giuseppe Bedeschi, Luciano Pellicani, Ruggero Guarini, Ernesto Galli della Loggia, Giampiero Mughini, Emanuele Macaluso, Predrag Matvejević, Francis Fukuyama, Arnaldo Colasanti, Attilio Scarpellini, Giuliano Cazzola, Adriano Sofri, Stefano Folli, Paolo Franchi, Ferdinando Imposimato, Anna Germoni, Federico Bugno and Piero Melograni.

Luigi Covatta has been the director since 2009. In 2019 the magazine was acquired by the Socialism Foundation; they placed Tommaso Nannicini and Cesare Pinelli as co-directors alongside Covatta. Among the current collaborators are: Gennaro Acquaviva, Salvo Andò, Alberto Benzoni, Daniela Brancati, Simona Colarizi, Biagio De Giovanni, Antonio Ghirelli, Walter Pedullà, Marco Tabili and Giuseppe Tamburrano. The editorial secretary is Dario Alberto Caprio and the editorial director is Roberto Biscardini.
