= Liceo Classico Massimo d'Azeglio =

Senior high school in Turin, Italy

Coordinates: 45.0649°N 7.6760°E

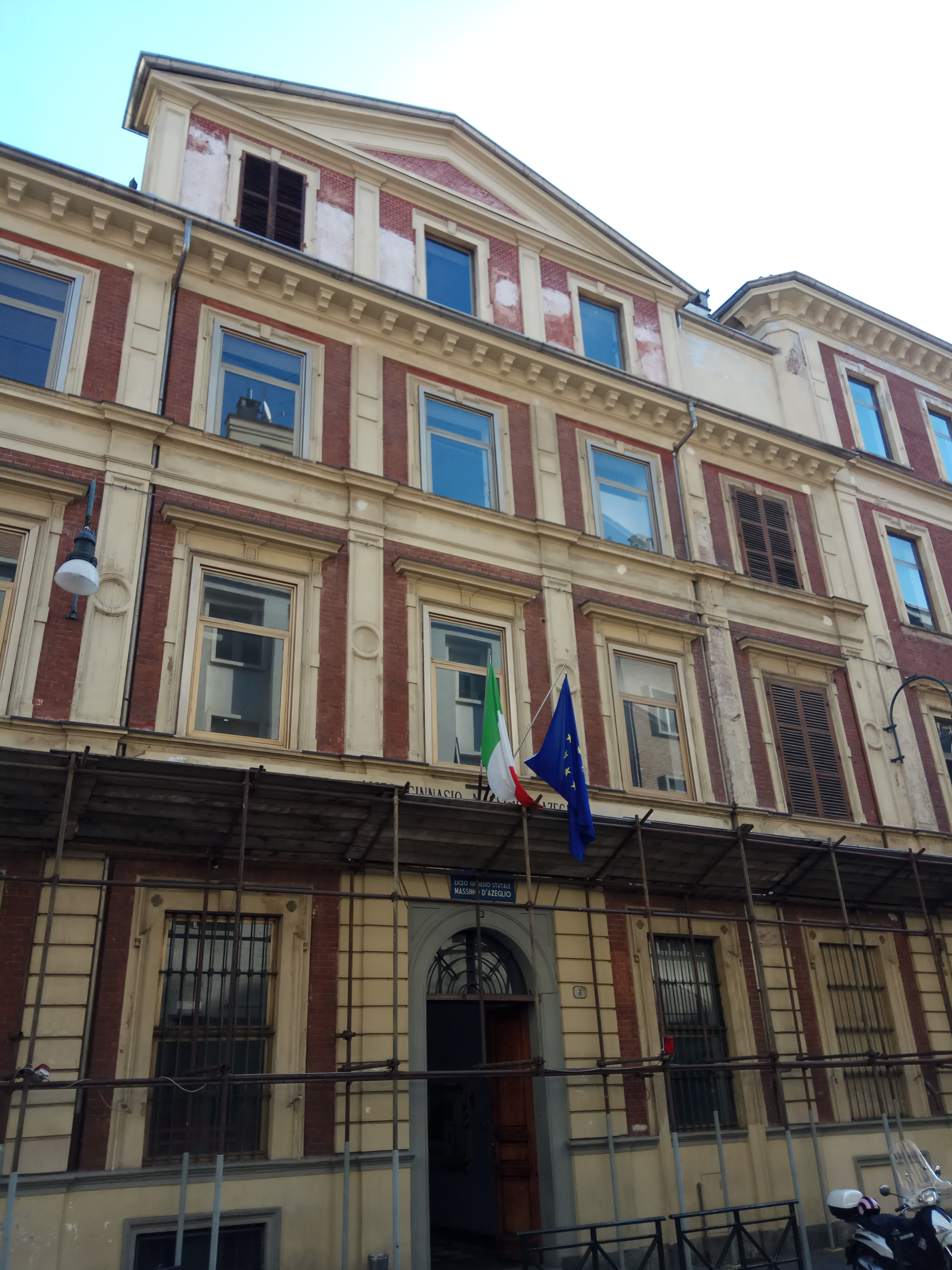
- Turin; Italy

Information
- Former names: Collegio di Porta Nuova (1831-1860); Regio Collegio Monviso (1860-1882)
- School type: Liceo classico
- Established: 1831; 195 years ago
- Website: www.liceodazeglio.edu.it

Liceo Classico Massimo d'Azeglio is a public sixth form college/senior high school (liceo classico) in Turin, Italy. It is named after the politician Massimo d'Azeglio.

== History ==
It was established as the Collegio di Porta Nuova in 1831 and became the Regio Collegio Monviso in 1860. It was renamed to its current name in 1882. In the early 20th century, several of the teachers were anti-fascist figures, including Augusto Monti and Zino Zini. David Ward, the author of "Primo Levi's Turin", wrote that Liceo d'Azeglio was "one of Turin's most prestigious schools".

The school is linked to the founding of Juventus FC as Sport-Club Juventus in late 1897 by pupils of the school; two years later, they were renamed as Foot-Ball Club Juventus. The school held two study days in honour of alumnus Primo Levi in 2007.

== Notable alumni ==
- Norberto Bobbio
- Giulio Einaudi
- Vittorio Foa
- Leone Ginzburg
- Gino Levi-Montalcini
- Primo Levi
- Giancarlo Pajetta
- Cesare Pavese
- Fernanda Pivano
- Alexandro Tirelli
