= Edoardo Volterra =

Italian jurist and partisan

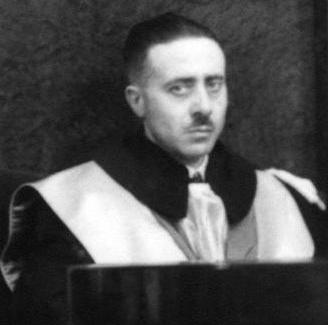
Edoardo Volterra

Edoardo Volterra (1904–1984) was an Italian scholar of Roman law. Son of the distinguished Italian mathematician Vito Volterra, Edoardo Volterra held a series of teaching positions at the Universities of Cagliari, Camerino, Pisa, and Bologna before finally accepting a call to the Sapienza University of Rome. He published works on a variety of topics on Roman law. His first major work was on the Collatio Legum Mosaicarum et Romanarum. Volterra later went on to publish an array of works on Roman marriage law, Roman private law, and laws of the Ancient Eastern Mediterranean World.

Opposed to the rise of fascism, the Jewish Volterra was forced out of his position in 1938. He joined an anti-fascist partisan organization (the Partito d'Azione or "Action party") and was decorated for bravery in combat against fascist forces. After the end of World War II, he was made Rector of the University of Bologna for two years and then he returned to the Sapienza University of Rome as a professor. In 1971, several of his students published the six-volume Studi in onore di Edoardo Volterra in his honor. Volterra died in 1984. The "Project Volterra," an international scholarly collaborative project named in his honor, provides an internet resource for scholars working on topics in Roman law.

== Selected publications ==
- Edoardo Volterra, Collatio legum Mosaicarum et Romanarum (Rome: Bardi, 1930).
- Edoardo Volterra, La conception du mariage d'après les juristes romains (Padua: La Garangola, 1940).
- Edoardo Volterra, Lezioni di diritto romano : il matrimonio romano (Rome: Edizioni Ricerche, 1961).
- Edoardo Volterra, Corso di lezioni: diritti dell'Oriente mediterraneo (Rome: Rome: Edizioni Ricerche, 1970).
- Edoardo Volterra, Istituzioni di diritto privato romano (Rome: Edizioni Ricerche, 1977).
- Edoardo Volterra, Sulla legge delle citazioni (Rome: Accademia Nazionale dei Lincei,1983).

== Honors ==
in 1973, he received an honorary degree from the University of Bordeaux.
