= Cesare Luporini =

Italian philosopher and politician

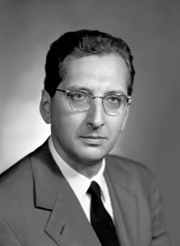

Member of the Senate
- In office 15 May 1958 – 12 June 1963
- Constituency: Tuscany

Personal details
- Born: 20 August 1909 Ferrara, Italy
- Died: 9 April 1993 (aged 83) Florence, Italy
- Party: Italian Communist Party
- Education: University of Florence
- Profession: Philosopher; university professor

Cesare Luporini (20 August 1909 – 9 April 1993) was an Italian philosopher, historian of philosophy and politician.

== Biography ==
Luporini was born in Ferrara, but lived in Florence since childhood. Luporini graduated from the University of Florence in 1933 with a thesis on Kant. Immediately after graduation, in 1933, he went to Freiburg, where he attended Martin Heidegger's classes (already attended as a student in 1931) and, after Heidegger's accession to Nazism, to Berlin, he listened to Nicolai Hartmann's lectures on ethics. Following the publication of the first essays on Scheler and Leopardi, and after having started teaching in the Tuscan high schools, he was called by Giovanni Gentile in 1939 to cover the role of German lecturer at the Scuola Normale Superiore in Pisa, where he remained until the end of the war.

In the Thirties and Forties, Luporini was one of the representatives of Italian existentialism, with a reflection focused on the freedom of the individual. Politically, he was involved in the liberal-socialist anti-fascist resistance movement during WWII.

With the end of the war, Luporini went from existentialism to Marxism and joined the Italian Communist Party. With Ranuccio Bianchi Bandinelli and Romano Bilenchi he founded in Florence, in 1945, the cultural magazine Società. He continued his university teaching as a professor of History of Philosophy and then of Moral Philosophy at the Universities of Cagliari, Pisa and Florence.

From 1956 he became a member of the Central Committee of the PCI and remained there until the dissolution of the party. He was elected senator in the third legislature (1958–1963). Among the parliamentary initiatives, he is co-signer, together with Ambrogio Donini, of the draft law (n.359, 21 January 1959) for an organic reform of the lower secondary school, considered a fundamental step for the democratization of civil life. During the tough political confrontation that in 1989 led to the dissolution of the PCI and the formation of the PDS, he sided with Pietro Ingrao against the "turning point" of Achille Occhetto, for the defense and revival of the Communist Refoundation.

He died in Florence in 1993, his remains rest in the family chapel in the cemetery of the Porte Sante in Florence.

== Works ==
- Situazione e libertà nell'esistenza umana [Situation and Freedom in Human Existence], Firenze, Le Monnier (1942) (II edizione, modificata e aumentata, Firenze, Sansoni, (1945); III edizione in C. Luporini, Situazione e libertà nell'esistenza umana e altri scritti, Roma, Editori Riuniti, 1993).
- Filosofi vecchi e nuovi, Firenze, Sansoni (1947).
- La mente di Leonardo [Leonardo's Mind], Firenze, Sansoni (1953) (III edizione, Firenze, Le Lettere, 2019).
- Voltaire e le 'Lettres philosophiques', Firenze, Sansoni (1955) (II edizione, Torino, Einaudi, 1977).
- Spazio e materia in Kant [Space and Matter in Kant], Firenze, Sansoni, 1961.
- Introduzione a K. Marx-F. Engels, L'ideologia tedesca, Roma, Editori Riuniti, 1967 (III edizione, Roma, Editori Riuniti, 2017).
- Dialettica e materialismo [Dialectic and Materialism], Roma, Editori Riuniti, 1974.
- Decifrare Leopardi, Napoli, Macchiaroli, 1998.
- Gli interventi politici sono raccolti in Cesare Luporini politico, a cura di Federico Lucarini e Sergio Filippo Magni, Roma, Carocci, 2016.
- Altri testi rilevanti pubblicati postumi:
- Il problema della soggettività [The Problem of Subjectivity], «Annali del dipartimento di filosofia dell'Università di Firenze», n. s., V, 2002, pp. 9–21 (relazione al convegno con Sartre del 1961).
- La XI Tesi di Marx su Feuerbach, «Giornale critico della filosofia italiana», XCVII, n. XVI, 2018, pp. 451–486 (lezioni all'Istituto Italiano per gli Studi Filosofici di Napoli del 1983).
- A complete list of works has been published in Cesare Luporini, 1909–1993, "Il Ponte", 11, 2009 (cfr. pp. 249–289).
