= L'Italia Libera =

Italian political party newspaper

Cover of the partisan newspaper labeled "the organ of the Action Party," urging the liberation of Italy ahead of the Allied forces, which had reached Rome three days before.

L'Italia Libera (meaning Free Italy in English) was the newspaper of the Italian anti-fascist organization and political party Partito d'Azione (abbrev: Pd'A) (Action Party).

== History and profile ==
L'Italia Libera was founded in July 1942. The first issue of the paper appeared in January 1943. It was published by the Action Party. The paper was published on a press in the basement of premises at Via Basento 55, in Rome, until it was raided in November 1943. Leone Ginzburg was the editor until his arrest (and subsequent murder) in 1943. Carlo Levi served as the editor-in-chief of the paper between 1945 and 1946.
