= Leone Ginzburg =

Italian editor, writer, journalist and teacher (1909–1944)

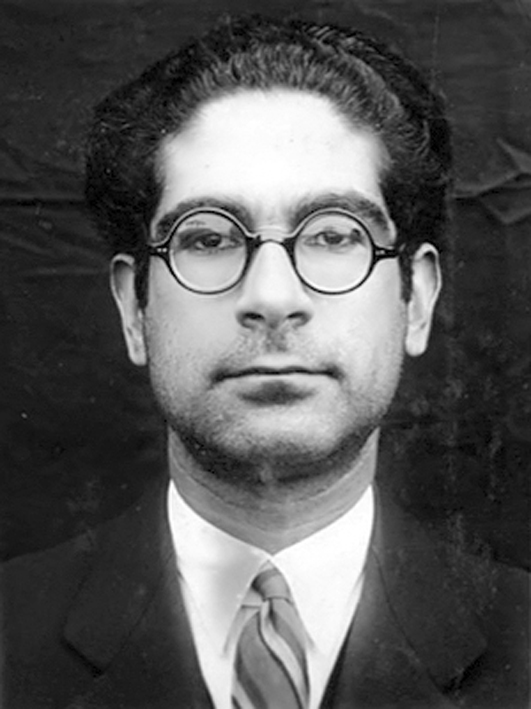
- Ginzburg in his 1934 mugshot
- Born: Lev Fyodorovich Ginzburg; 4 April 1909; Odessa, Kherson Governorate, Russian Empire
- Died: 5 February 1944 (aged 34); Rome, Lazio, Kingdom of Italy
- Resting place: Campo Verano, Rome
- Education: Liceo Classico Massimo d'Azeglio; University of Turin
- Occupations: Author; journalist; teacher; anti-fascist activist
- Spouse: Natalia Ginzburg (m. 1938)
- Children: 3, including Carlo
- Relatives: Lisa Ginzburg (granddaughter)
- Writing career
- Pen name: Leonida Gianturco

Leone Ginzburg (Note: Italian pronunciation: [leˈoːne ˈɡintsburɡ, - ˈɡin(d)zburɡ].) (born Lev Fyodorovich Ginzburg; (Note: Russian: Лев Фёдорович Гинзбург, pronounced [ˈlʲef ˈfʲɵdərəvʲɪdʑ ˈɡʲinzbʊrk]. In this name that follows East Slavic naming customs, the patronymic is Fyodorovich and the family name is Ginzburg.) 4 April 1909 – 5 February 1944) was an Italian editor, writer, journalist and teacher, as well as an important anti-fascist political activist and a hero of the resistance movement. He was the husband of the renowned author Natalia Ginzburg and the father of the historian Carlo Ginzburg.

== Early life and career ==
Ginzburg was born in Odessa, then part of the Russian Empire, to Jewish parents Fyodor Nikolayevich (born Tankhun Notkovich) Ginzburg, from Vilno Governorate, and Vera (born Khava Golda) Griliches, from Saint Petersburg, who had married in 1894. His father was an industrialist, while his mother was a social worker. His natural father was actually an Italian man, Renzo Segré, with whom his mother had a brief affair. Ginzburg had two older half-siblings, Marussia (1896–1994) and Nicola (1899–1985). The family members were all politically aligned, with positions ranging from Fyodor's liberalist views to Marussia's revolutionary socialist sympathies.

Since 1902, Italian educator and governess Maria Segré (Renzo's sister and Leone's biological aunt) had been teaching the Ginzburg children French and Italian; her presence fostered the family's contacts with Italy, with frequent trips to Tuscany beginning in 1907. From 1910 onwards, Leone was taken to Viareggio on vacation every summer. World War I began precisely while the family was on vacation in Viareggio in 1914, and while his older brother and sister (then 15 and 18) travelled with their mother back to Russia, Leone remained with Segré for the duration of the war, spending his time between Viareggio and Rome until 1919. He was reunited with his family when his mother and siblings fled to Italy following the October Revolution in Russia, settling in Turin. The Ginzburg family briefly followed the father to Berlin, where Leone attended a Russian high school between 1921 and 1923, before they all, except Fyodor (who died in Berlin in 1930), permanently moved back to Turin; there, Ginzburg studied at the Liceo Ginnasio Massimo d'Azeglio between 1924 and 1927. This school molded a group of intellectuals and political activists who would fight Benito Mussolini's Fascist regime and, eventually, help create the post-war democratic Italy: his teachers included Umberto Cosmo and Zino Zini, and his classmates such notable intellectuals as Norberto Bobbio, Piero Gobetti, Cesare Pavese, Giulio Einaudi, Massimo Mila, Vittorio Foa, Giancarlo Pajetta and Felice Balbo. During his time in Turin, he contributed to Il Baretti, a literary magazine launched by Piero Gobetti in 1924.

In the early 1930s, Ginzburg taught Slavic Languages and Russian Literature at the University of Turin, and was credited with helping introduce Russian authors to the Italian public. In 1933, Ginzburg co-founded, with Giulio Einaudi, the publishing house Einaudi. He lost his teaching position in 1934, having refused to swear an oath of allegiance imposed by the Fascist regime.

== Persecution and internal exile ==
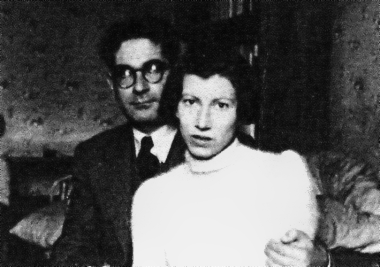
Natalia and Leone Ginzburg

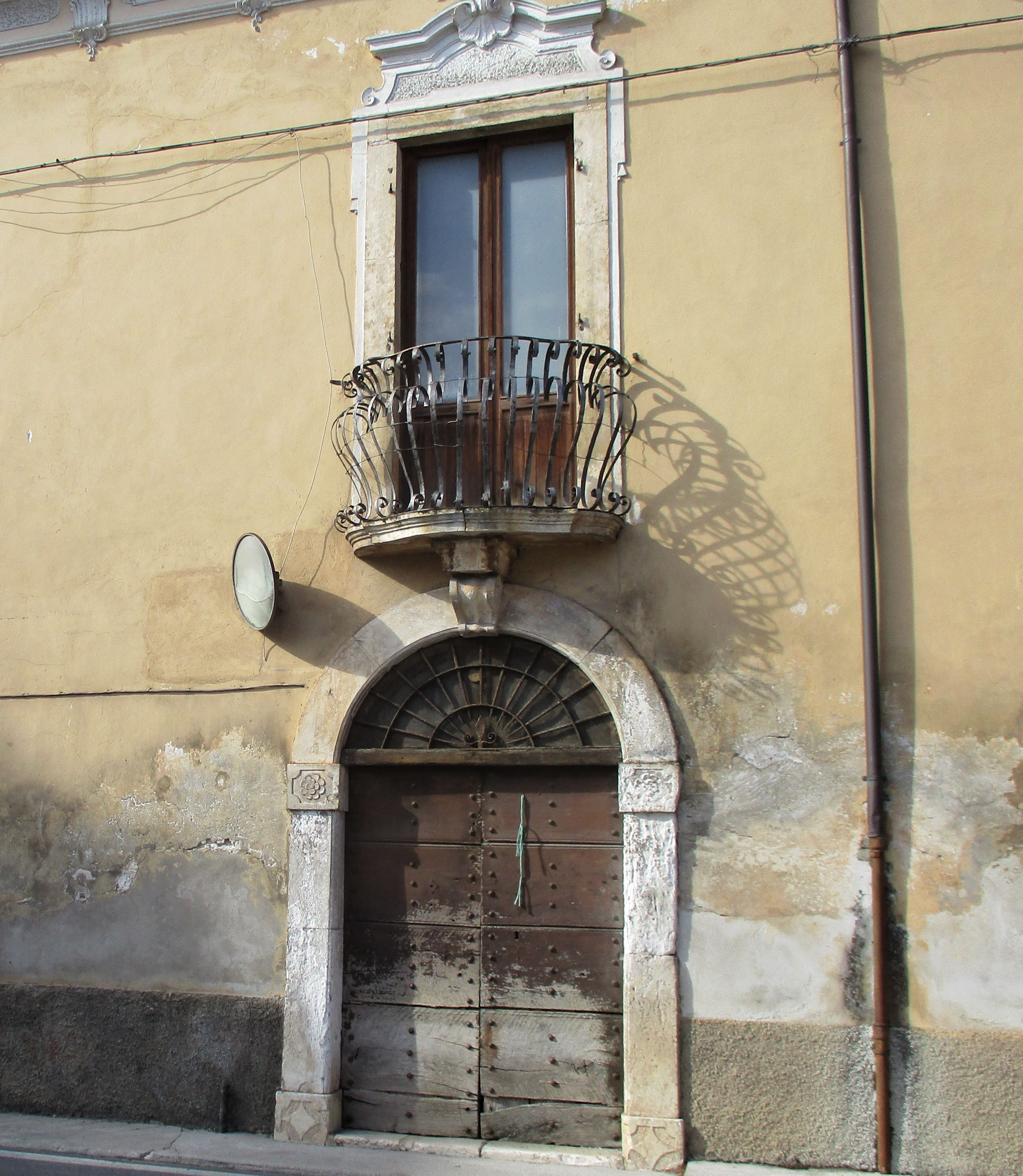
The house where the Ginzburgs lived in Pizzoli

Soon after this, he and 14 other young Turinese Jews, including Sion Segre Amar, were arrested for complicity in the so-called "Ponte Tresa Affair" (they were carrying anti-fascist literature over the border from Switzerland), but Ginzburg's sentence was light. He was arrested again in 1935 for his activities as leader (with Carlo Levi) of the Italian branch of Giustizia e Libertà ("Justice and Freedom"), the party which Carlo Rosselli had founded in Paris in 1929.

In 1938, he married Natalia Levi. The same year he lost his Italian citizenship when the Fascist regime introduced the Manifesto of Race and the antisemitic racial laws. In 1940, the Ginzburgs received the fascist punishment known as confino, or internal exile, to a remote, impoverished village, in their case Pizzoli in the Abruzzi, where they stayed from 1940 to 1943.

Somehow, Leone was able to continue his work as head of the Einaudi publishing house throughout the period. In 1942, he co-founded the clandestine Partito d'Azione ("Action Party"), which became part of the democratic resistance. He also edited their newspaper L'Italia Libera.

== Capture and murder ==
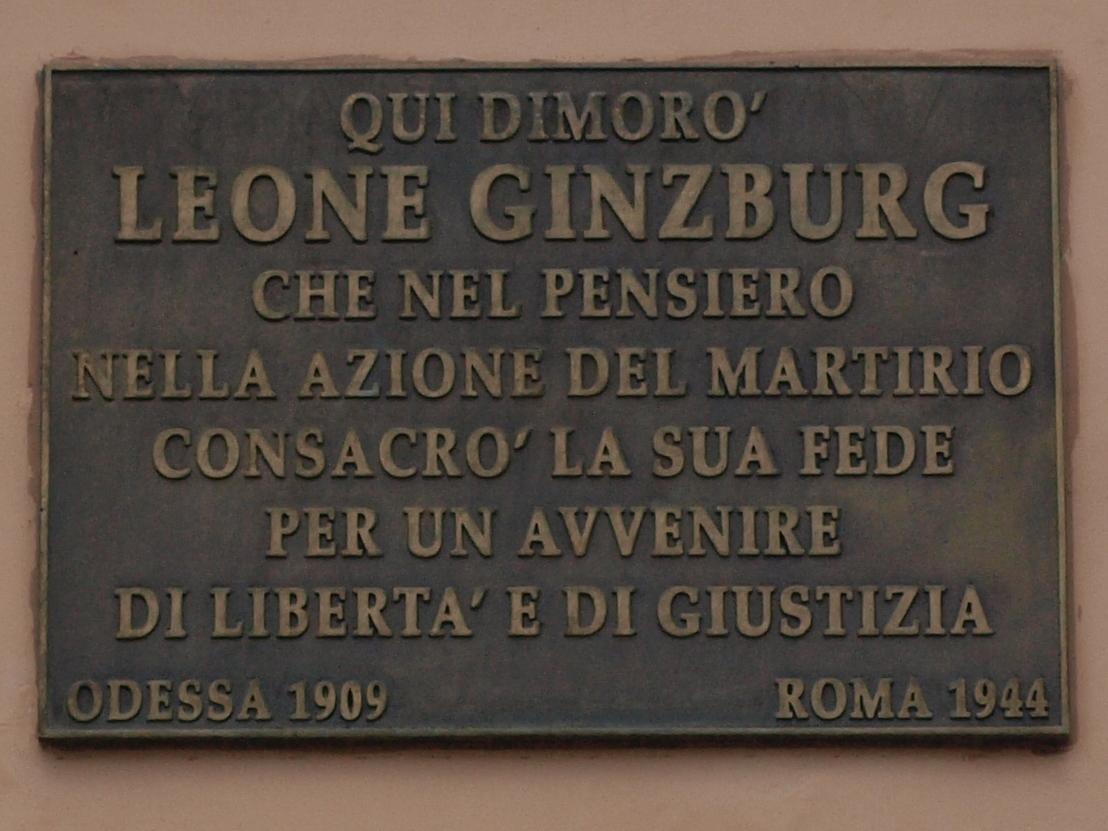
Memorial plaque on Ginzburg's house in Pizzoli; it reads: "Here dwelled Leone Ginzburg, who by the thought and by the action of martyrdom devoted his faith to a future of freedom and justice."

In 1943, after the Allied invasion of Sicily and the fall of Mussolini, Leone went to Rome, leaving his family in the Abruzzi. When Nazi Germany invaded in September, Natalia Ginzburg and their three children fled Pizzoli, simply climbing aboard a German truck and telling the driver that they were war refugees who had lost their papers. They met with Leone and went into hiding in the capital.

On 20 November 1943, Leone – who now used the false name Leonida Gianturco – was arrested by the Italian police in a clandestine printshop of the newspaper L'Italia Libera. He was taken to the German section of the Regina Coeli prison. They subjected him to severe torture. On 5 February 1944, he died there from the injuries he received; he was 34 years old.

== Works ==
- Scrittori russi (1948)
- Scritti (1964)
