= Action Party (Italy) =

Action Party Partito d'Azione
- President: Carlo Rosselli (1929–1937); Emilio Lussu (1937–1943); Ferruccio Parri (1943–1945); Ugo La Malfa (1945–1946); Ernesto Rossi (1946–1947)
- Founder(s): Carlo Rosselli; Gaetano Salvemini
- Founded: 1 July 1929; 97 years ago (as Justice and Freedom); 14 June 1942; 84 years ago (as the Action Party)
- Dissolved: 25 April 1947; 79 years ago
- Merged into: Italian Socialist Party (majority); Italian Republican Party (minority)
- Newspaper: L'Italia Libera
- Armed wing: Giustizia e Libertà
- Ideology: Liberal socialism Social liberalism Radicalism; Anti-fascism; Republicanism
- Political position: Centre-left
- National affiliation: National Liberation Committee
- Colours: Green

The Action Party (Italian: Partito d'Azione, PdA) was a liberal-socialist political party in Italy. The party was anti-fascist and republican. Its prominent leaders were Carlo Rosselli, Ferruccio Parri, Emilio Lussu and Ugo La Malfa. Other prominent members included Leone Ginzburg, Ernesto de Martino, Norberto Bobbio, Riccardo Lombardi, Vittorio Foa and the Nobel-winning poet Eugenio Montale.

== History ==
Founded in July 1942 by former militants of Giustizia e Libertà (Justice and Freedom), liberal-socialists and democrats. Ideologically, they were heirs to the liberal socialism of Carlo Rosselli and to Piero Gobetti's liberal revolution, whose writings rejected Marxist economic determinism and aimed at the overcoming of class struggle and for a new shape of socialism, respect for civil liberty and for radical change in both the social and the economic structure of Italy. From January 1943, it published a clandestine newspaper, L'Italia Libera (Free Italy), edited by Leone Ginzburg. In the same year, members of the party came into contact with Allied secret services stationed in neutral Switzerland. In particular, this activity was commissioned to Filippo Caracciolo, had a special relationship with British Special Operations Executive. Caracciolo tried to avoid Allied bombing on Italy, but most of all he tried to get British support for an Anti-Fascist Committee that was supposed to lead the new government after an anti-Mussolini coup.

After the armistice of 8 September 1943, as a central member of the National Liberation Committee the Action Party actively participated in the Italian resistance movement with units of Giustizia e Libertà commanded by Ferruccio Parri. It maintained a clear anti-monarchical position and it was opposed to Palmiro Togliatti and the Italian Communist Party's Salerno Initiative for postwar governance. The party adopted the symbol of a flaming sword and in the immediate post-war period joined the government securing the post of Prime Minister for Ferruccio Parri from June to November 1945. As a result of the internal conflict between the democratic-reformist line of Ugo La Malfa and the socialist line of Emilio Lussu, combined with the electoral defeat of 1946, the party folded. Unwillingness of the party members to work with reviving political parties "tainted by association with Fascism" also resulted in the decline of the Action Party. The main group of former members led by Riccardo Lombardi joined the Italian Socialist Party while the La Malfa group (as the Movement for Republican Democracy) entered the Italian Republican Party. The last secretary general of the Action Party was Alberto Cianca.

== Prominent members ==
- Lelio Basso
- Giorgio Bassani
- Norberto Bobbio
- Piero Calamandrei
- Aldo Capitini
- Filippo Caracciolo
- Nicola Chiaromonte
- Carlo Azeglio Ciampi
- Alberto Cianca
- Tristano Codignola
- Enrico Cuccia
- Francesco de Martino
- Oriana Fallaci
- Vittorio Foa
- Leone Ginzburg
- Natalia Ginzburg
- Ugo La Malfa
- Carlo Levi
- Primo Levi
- Riccardo Lombardi
- Emilio Lussu
- Raffaele Mattioli
- Eugenio Montale
- Ferruccio Parri
- Ernesto Rossi
- Gaetano Salvemini
- Eugenio Scalfari
- Altiero Spinelli
- Alberto Tarchiani
- Leo Valiani
- Franco Venturi
- Edoardo Volterra
- Bruno Zevi

=== Italian Parliament ===
Chamber of Deputies
Election year	Votes	%	Seats	+/–	Leader
1946	334,748 (8th)	1.45	7 / 556	–	Riccardo Lombardi

== See also ==
- Italian resistance movement
- Liberalism and radicalism in Italy

== Sources ==
- Website of the Italian Resistance Historical Society ("Il Partito d'Azione"), including in-depth bios, recent remembrances and selections from party documents.
- Historical dictionary entry from Paravia Mondadori Editori, an Italian educational publishing house ("Storia del Partito d'Azione").
