= Raffaele Mattioli =

Italian painter

Raffaele Mattioli (1775 - after 1831) was an Italian painter, active in his native Naples.

He trained under Vincenzo Pastore, and was given a stipend to study in Rome. He returned to paint Oath of the Romans before the Law and Death of Hector for Lord Bristol. He became a Professor in the painting of figures at the Academy of Fine Arts in Naples. He was also used for the painted decoration of figures in the Teatro San Carlo.
