= Ferdinando Carabba Tettamanti =

Italian lawyer

Ferdinando Carabba Tettamanti (born January 5, 1944, in Rome) is an Italian lawyer.

== Biography ==
Graduated 1967 with J.D. in Law from the University of Rome “La Sapienza”. For thirty years was a core partner at the Law Firm Studio Carnelutti, Rome. In 2006 he founded a new law firm, Carabba & Partners, with head office in Rome, via dei Condotti, 91, with over 30 professionals.

In February of the same year, Mr. Carabba formed an alliance with Studio Carnelutti of Milan, and through him the two branches (the Rome and Milan offices) of the historic Studio Carnelutti, founded at the end of the 19th century by Prof. Francesco Carnelutti, were reunited. Mr. Carabba is the legal consultant for leading Italian and foreign industrial and banking groups.

== Offices held ==
Carabba sits on several Boards of Directors of important Italian and foreign corporations.
